= SCR =

SCR, or scr, may refer to:

== Organizations ==
- Sacred Congregation of Rites, a former Congregation of the Roman Curia
- Senior common room, of a higher education institution
- South Coast Repertory, theatre located in Costa Mesa, California
- BBC Southern Counties Radio, a former radio service
- Sport Club do Recife, a Brazilian soccer team
- Success case replication, a methodology claiming to identify, verify, and multiply successful enterprises
- Supreme Court Reports (Canada)
- Supreme Court Reports (India)

== Science and technology ==
- Satellite channel router
- Screener (promotional), a movie piracy rip, a motion picture film transfer process identifier
- Selective catalytic reduction, a technology for control of NO_{X} emissions in furnace flue gas and internal combustion engine exhaust
- Self-consistent renormalization, a theory for magnetic materials also used in high-temperature superconductivity
- Semi-closed circuit rebreather, a type of self-contained breathing apparatus
- Short circuit ratio (disambiguation), multiple values used in electrical engineering
- Short consensus sequence repeat (SCR) or complement control protein (CCP) repeat
- Signal Corps Radio or Set, Complete, Radio, U.S. Army Signal Corps designation
- Silicon controlled rectifier, a type of thyristor
- Skin conductance response
- Space charge region, of a semiconductor device
- Steel catenary riser, a type of pipe used in offshore oil rigs
- Studio control room, also known as production control room or gallery that manages television studio productions
- Summary Care Record, a UK NHS electronic patient record
- Supply chain resilience
- Sustainable cell rate, a parameter of a traffic contract
- .scr, a file extension used for Microsoft Windows screensavers
- .scr, a file extension used for script files by EAGLE

== Transport ==
- Ruf SCR, a sports car manufactured by German automobile manufacturer Ruf Automobile
- Scandinavian Mountains Airport (IATA: SCR), Dalarna, Sweden
- Siler City Municipal Airport (FAA LID: SCR), Siler City, North Carolina
- Smyrna Cassaba Railway, an Ottoman railway
- South Central Railway in India
- South Coast Rail, a rail construction project in Massachusetts, US
- South Cross Route, the designation for the southern section of Ringway 1, the innermost circuit of the London Ringways network
- The National Rail code for St Columb Road railway station in Cornwall, UK
- Suez Canal Route, an international ocean trade route
- Sydney Coal Railway, a Canadian short-line railway operating in the eastern part of Cape Breton County, Nova Scotia

== Other uses ==
- Salford City Reds, former name of Salford Red Devils, an English Rugby League team
- Science and Consciousness Review, a website presenting publicly accessible summaries of scientific studies of consciousness and related issues
- Seabird Colony Register, a British database of birds
- Senate concurrent resolution
- Seychellois rupee (ISO 4217 code), the currency of Seychelles
- Simcoe County Rovers FC, a Canadian soccer team
- Slot car racing a hobby which involves electric model car racing on tracks
- Solvency Capital Requirement, in Solvency II
- Supreme Court Review, a peer-edited law review in the US.
- FightLite SCR, a firearm whose lower receiver is generally compatible with AR-15 upper receivers
