= Raynham Place station =

Proposed railway station in Raynham, Massachusetts

Raynham Place
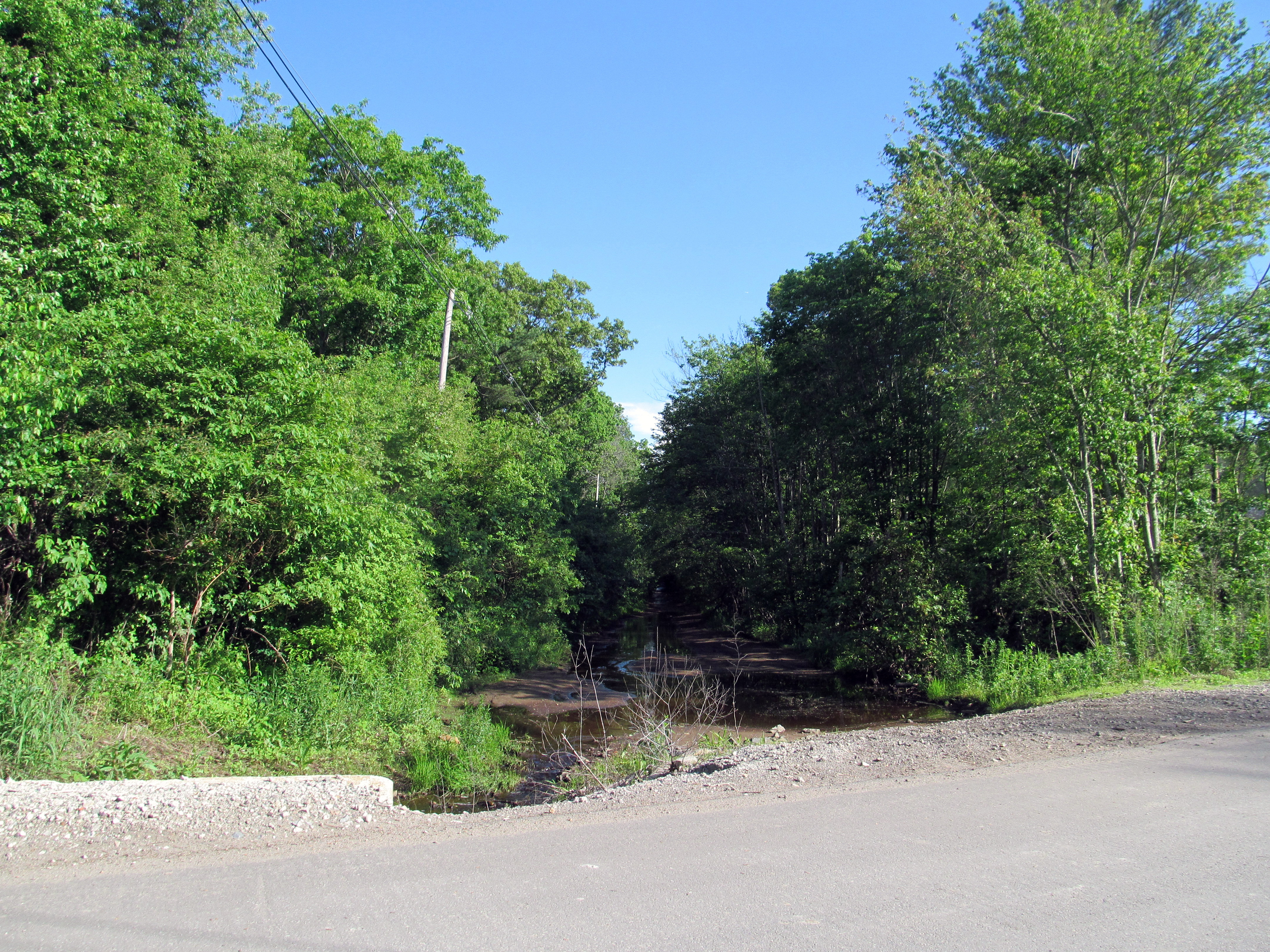
- Site of the proposed station photographed in 2017

General information
- Location: Broadway (Route 138); Raynham, Massachusetts
- Coordinates: 41°58′48.04″N 71°4′31.53″W
- Line: Dighton and Somerset Railroad
- Platforms: 1 island platform (proposed)
- Tracks: 2 (proposed)

Construction
- Parking: 432 spaces
- Accessible: Yes

History
- Opening: 2030 (proposed)
Former services at Raynham station
Preceding station	New York, New Haven and Hartford Railroad	Following station
Whittenton toward New Bedford	Boston–New Bedford	Easton toward Boston
Whittenton toward Fall River	Boston–Fall River	Easton toward Boston
Proposed services
Preceding station	MBTA	Following station
Taunton toward Battleship Cove or New Bedford	South Coast Rail Phase 2	Easton Village toward South Station
Location

Raynham Place station (called Raynham Park in some documents) is a proposed MBTA Commuter Rail station in Raynham, Massachusetts. Under current plans, it would be constructed behind the Raynham Park racing center north of downtown Raynham and open in 2030 as part of the second phase of the South Coast Rail project.

== History ==
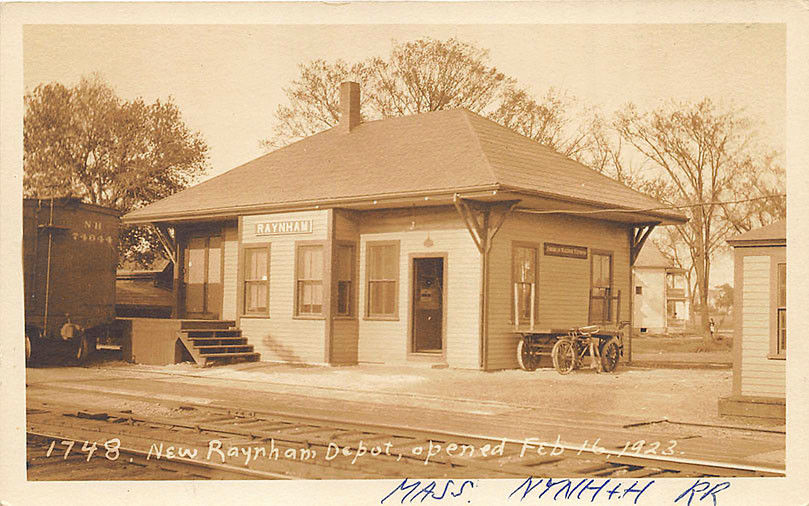
Raynham station, seen here in 1923, was located two miles south of the new proposed station

The Dighton and Somerset Railroad opened through Raynham in 1866. Raynham station was located in the village of North Raynham where the line crossed Broadway. In 1882, the Old Colony Railroad opened the Whittenton Branch Branch from the station to Whittenton Junction, allowing trains to use Taunton Central station instead of Dean Street station. Service was gradually rerouted onto the new branch; Raynham ceased to be a junction in 1932 when rails were removed between the station and Dean Street. The station itself closed between 1930 and 1935. New Haven Railroad passenger service through Raynham ended in 1938 as part of the 88 stations case, then resumed from 1950 to 1958.

A new MBTA Commuter Rail station, Raynham Place, is proposed to be built by 2030 as part of the second phase of the South Coast Rail project. An 800-foot-long high-level island platform serving two tracks would be constructed next to an access road behind the Raynham Park racing center, two miles north of the former station site. Current plans have a pedestrian bridge crossing the tracks from the middle of the platform; a previous design placed the bridge at the north end of the platform.
