= Taunton station =

Taunton station or Taunton railway station could refer to:

- Taunton railway station in Taunton, England
- Taunton station (Amtrak), in Taunton, Massachusetts
- Taunton station (MBTA) in Taunton, Massachusetts
