= Supreme Court Reports =

Supreme Court Reports may refer to:

- Supreme Court Reports (Canada)
- Supreme Court Reports (India)

== See also ==
- United States Reports, reports of the Supreme Court of the United States
