= Old Colony Railroad Station =

Old Colony Railroad Station may refer to:

- Old Colony Railroad Station (North Easton, Massachusetts)
- Old Colony Railroad Station (Taunton, Massachusetts)
- Stoughton Railroad Station
