= Dighton and Somerset Railroad =

Former railroad in Massachusetts, United States

Overview
- Locale: Massachusetts, United States
- Dates of operation: 1863–1865
- Successors: Old Colony and Newport Railway (1865), Old Colony Railroad (1872), New Haven Railroad (1893)

Technical
- Track gauge: 4 ft 8 1/2 in (1,435 mm)

The Dighton and Somerset Railroad, currently referred to as the Dean Street Industrial Track, is a railroad that ran between Fall River and Braintree, Massachusetts. It opened in 1866; from the 1890s to the 1930s and again in the late 1950s, it was the primary rail route from Boston to the South Coast. Passenger service ended in stages with the final regular service in 1958, though freight service on two short segments continues into the 21st century. MBTA Commuter Rail service is proposed to be extended onto the northern part of the line around 2030 as part of the South Coast Rail project.

== History ==
=== Old Colony era ===
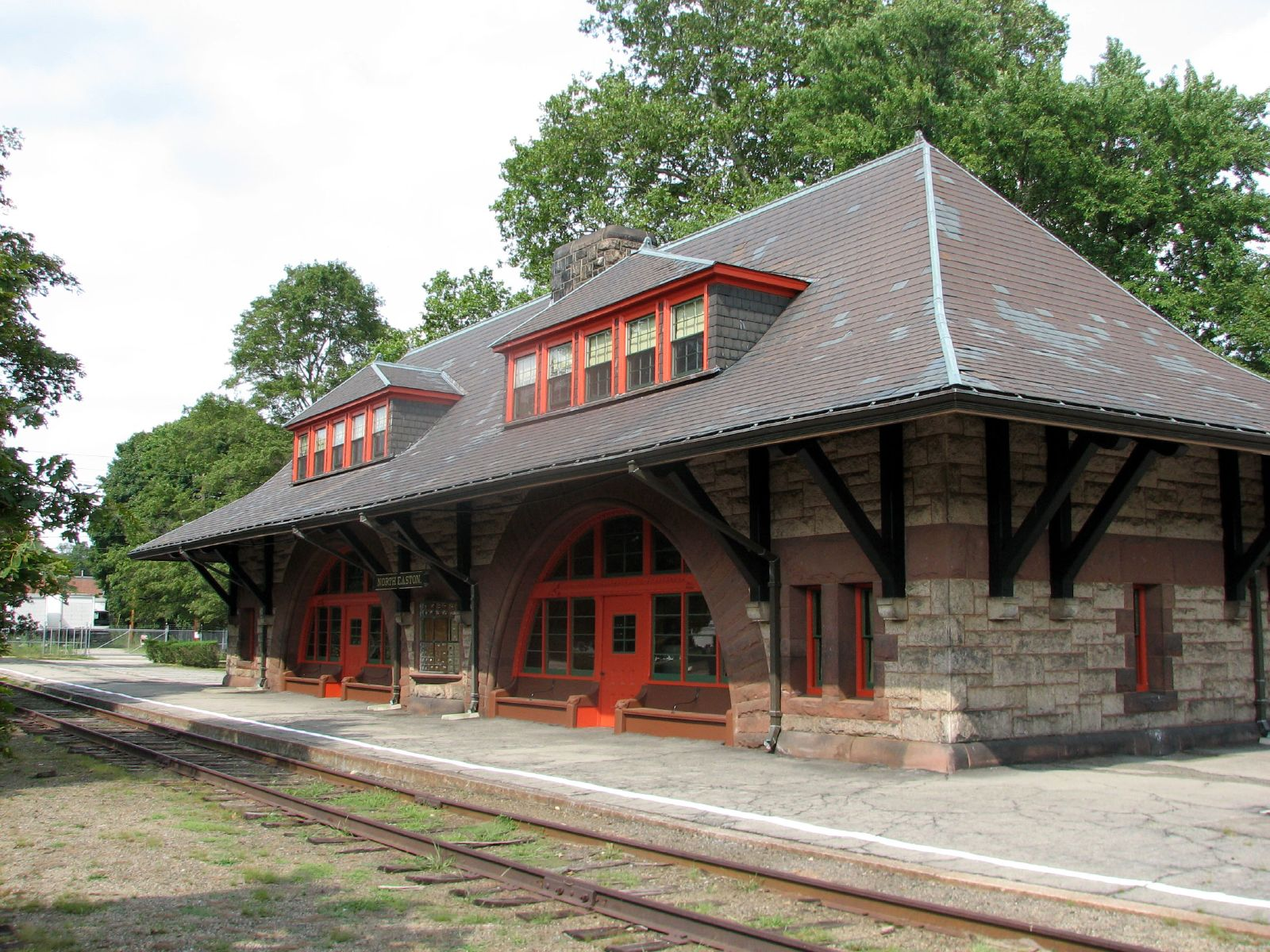
North Easton, designed by H.H. Richardson, was constructed on the Dighton and Somerset by the Old Colony and Newport Railway in 1881

In 1863, the Dighton and Somerset Railroad was chartered to build a new line from Taunton to Somerset (across the river from Fall River) via Dighton. In 1864, the charter was amended to allow extension north to Randolph or Braintree. This represented a significant threat to the Old Colony and Newport Railway (OC&N) and its existing route to Fall River; the OC&N acquired the new railroad in 1865. The OC&N was interested in having a route to the growing industrial city of Taunton, which was served by its competitor Boston and Providence Railroad (B&P) via the Taunton Branch Railroad. The line was opened in September 1866; it used part of the 1855-built Easton Branch Railroad (acquired from the B&P at that time) south of Stoughton Junction, which also gave the OC&N a new freight connection to Stoughton. The new railroad passed east of downtown Taunton with a station at Dean Street and crossed the tracks of the New Bedford and Taunton Railroad at Weir Junction near Weir Village. The line then ran along the west bank of the Taunton River through its namesake towns of Dighton and Somerset before crossing the river over a man-made causeway and bridge at the north end of Fall River.

The OC&N became the Old Colony Railroad in 1872. Around 1882, the Old Colony began diverting trains on a new branch from Raynham to Whittenton Junction (the Whittenton Branch, which allowed all service to stop at the new Taunton Central Station. In 1888, the Old Colony acquired the B&P; the Easton Branch was upgraded between Stoughton and Stoughton Junction to allow use of the Dighton and Somerset as a through route to the South Coast via the B&P mainline rather than the Old Colony mainline. In 1893, the Old Colony Railroad was itself leased to The New York, New Haven and Hartford Railroad. The New Haven further consolidated service to Taunton Central; by 1895, the Fall River Line's Boat Train was the only passenger service between Raynham and Weir Junction. All passenger service through Dean Street ended in 1897.

In 1906, the Mount Hope Finishing Company built a 3-mile (4.8 km) freight branch from the Dighton and Somerset mainline to its textile plant in North Dighton. The branch was taken over by the New Haven three years later. The branch was abandoned when the plant closed in 1951, but most of the rails between Somerset Avenue and Warner Boulevard remain in place. The Taunton River drawbridge was rebuilt in the late 1910s.

=== Decline ===
The New Haven began shifting through service onto the Dighton and Somerset in the 1890s, and was the New Haven's primary Boston-Fall River route by the late 1910s. Around 1927, all through trains were routed via Stoughton instead of the original route through Braintree. Passenger service ended between Randolph and Stoughton Junction around 1927, and from Braintree Highlands to Randolph in 1938. In 1932, all passenger service and through freight service ended south of Weir Junction when the drawbridge over the Taunton River was disabled after a ship hit another bridge carrying power cables. The line was taken out of service between Dean Street and Raynham that year and formally abandoned in 1937, along with the section south of Dighton. The New Haven received ICC permission to abandon the section between Randolph and Stoughton Junction on June 11, 1937; it was abandoned in 1938.

Also in 1937, South Coast service was rerouted via Mansfield; shuttles ran from Canton Junction to North Easton and Whittendon, with a small amount of through service to Boston. During the 1940s, service between Whittendon and North Easton was cut for several years, leaving just the North Easton shuttles. These too were cut in 1950, but New Bedford service was rerouted via Stoughton to maintain minimal service on the branch. South Coast service alternated between the Stoughton and Mansfield routes until 1955, when a grade separation project in Mansfield forced all service to the Stoughton route.

In the late 1950s, with the pending completion of the Southeast Expressway and plans for the Southwest Expressway, the New Haven received a court decision allowing it to begin cutting all Old Colony Division service. Service to Taunton, Fall River, and New Bedford was discontinued on September 5, 1958, ending all remaining regular passenger service on the former Dighton and Somerset. Stoughton service was retained because the branch was part of the former B&P and not subject to the court order allowing discontinuance. A summer-only train to Cape Cod was operated via Stoughton and Taunton in 1961, but it made no local stops.

=== Later use ===
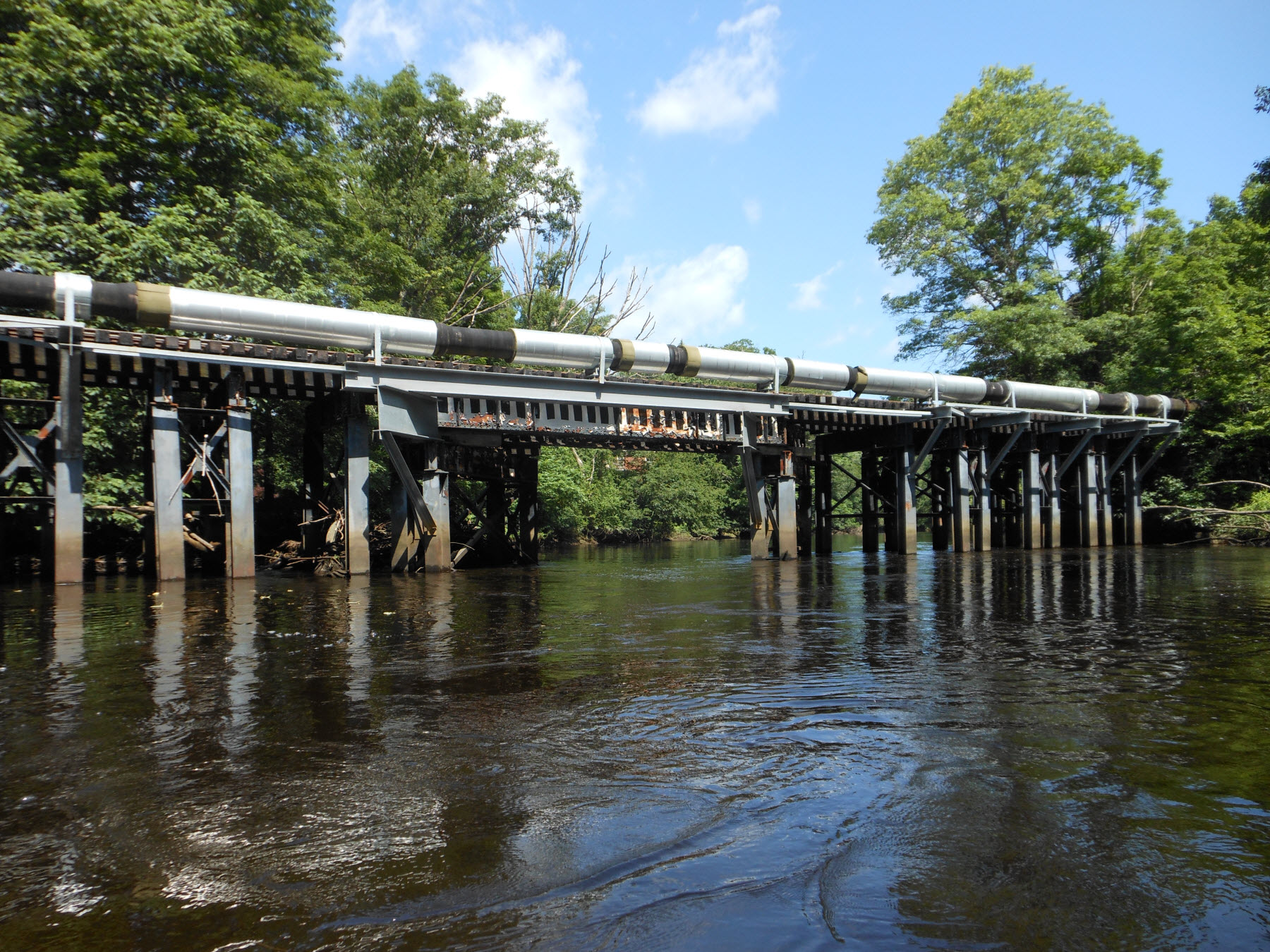
Former railroad bridge in Taunton, carrying the 2007-built water main

The Whittendon Branch and the mainline from Raynham to Easton were abandoned in 1966, followed by Dighton to Weir Village in 1971, Easton to Stoughton in 1976, Weir Village to Weir Junction in 1982, and Randolph to near Braintree Highlands in 1982. The state bought the abandoned line from Stoughton to Taunton on January 27, 1973 during an acquisition of Penn Central's commuter rail assets. Conrail continued to operate the Braintree Highlands stub after being created from Penn Central in 1976, while the Bay Colony Railroad took over the Dean Street Industrial Track (Dean Street to Weir Junction) in 1982. CSX took over the former line from Conrail in 1999. At the beginning of 2008, Massachusetts Coastal Railroad took over several former CSX and Bay Colony lines with a ten-year operating agreement. In April 2017, MassDOT released a Request for Information regarding potential operators for the Dean Street Industrial Track and other state-owned rail lines beginning in 2018.

In 2007, Aquaria Water constructed a 20-inch water line within portions of the former Dighton and Somerset right-of-way from its desalination plant in Dighton through Taunton and Raynham to serve the city of Brockton.

Three former stations on the line still exist: the 1876-built Dean Street station, the 1881-built North Easton station, and the 1888-built Stoughton station. All are listed on the National Register of Historic Places.

As of 2021, Massachusetts Coastal Railroad is the sole operator of rail traffic on the line, with freight trains running on the line several times per week.

== South Coast Rail ==
In the 1980s, the state began considering the expansion of MBTA Commuter Rail service to the South Coast cities of Taunton, Fall River, and New Bedford. By 1988, the MBTA was tentatively planning to extend service to Taunton via Stoughton and the former Dighton and Somerset. The first serious study, completed in January 1990, concluded that the Stoughton Branch was the most viable route. The March 1995 Expanded Feasibility Study concluded that both the Stoughton and Attleboro routes would be viable and that a partial Stoughton Branch extension to North Easton would be most cost-effective. A route through Attleboro was nearly built beginning in 1995; however, in 1997 the Expanded Alternatives Analysis showed vastly increased costs - $410M via Attleboro, $426M via Stoughton, or $312M via Middleborough. The report recommended the Stoughton route as the most cost-effective due to its high ridership, despite the higher cost.

Based on an April 1999 analysis of South Station operations, the July 1999 Draft Environmental Impact Report concluded that the Stoughton route was the only viable route, with projected service of 20 trains per day to each of Fall River and New Bedford. The Draft Environmental Statement certificate was received in November 2000; the EPA confirmed that Stoughton was the only practical route but required a Final Environmental Impact Statement (FEIS). The FEIS was released in April 2002 and approved in August; however, in July 2002 the MBTA revised the project cost to $600 million with an opening date of 2007. Due to ballooning costs, Governor Romney's administration suspended the Growth Task Force and stopped project planning in November 2002; the environmental approval process was stopped in May 2003.

Planning restarted several years later; the Phase 2 Alternatives Analysis Report (which indicated electric or diesel service through Stoughton as the best choice) was released in September 2009. The Army Corps of Engineers released a Draft Environmental Impact Statement in March 2011. Concurring with previous documents it recommended that South Coast Rail be routed through Stoughton, citing in particular the need to add a billion-dollar fourth track from Back Bay to Forest Hills to accommodate service through Attleboro. However, the DEIS differed from the previous reports by strongly recommending that service be electric.

In June 2016, MBTA announced that the project cost had been revised to $3.42 billion, with completion not expected until 2030. The substantial delay and increase in cost caused officials to consider alternate plans, including an earlier, interim addition of service to New Bedford via Middleborough. In March 2017, the state announced a revised plan intended to provide service sooner: Phase 1 would follow the Middleborough route and open in 2024; Phase 2 would follow the original route through Stoughton (including electrification) and open in 2029. By June 2017, the planned completion dates were changed to Phase 1 in 2022 and Phase 2 in 2030. The revised plan has attracted criticism from several directions, including Stoughton, Easton, and Raynham officials who have long been opposed to the Dighton and Somerset line being reactivated through their towns.

== Conversion to rail trail ==
A 7-mile (11.3 km) segment of the former D&S mainline that runs between Weir Junction and Dighton is currently planned for rail trail conversion as a part of Phase 1 of the Taunton River Trail project. As planned, the Taunton River Trail would consist of over 22 miles (35.4 km) of continuous off-road and on-road multi-use paths that will connect the communities of Taunton, Dighton, and Somerset along the Taunton River. Once complete, it will also intersect with the South Coast Bikeway at the Veterans Memorial Bridge in Somerset; additionally, a rail with trail connection is under consideration as a link to the Norton/Mansfield Rail Trail via the Middleboro Secondary.

In June 2023, the town of Dighton was awarded a $74,000 MassTrails grant to advance construction of Phase 1 of the rail trail through Sweets Knoll State Park.
