= Whittenton Branch =

Defunct railroad branch in Massachusetts

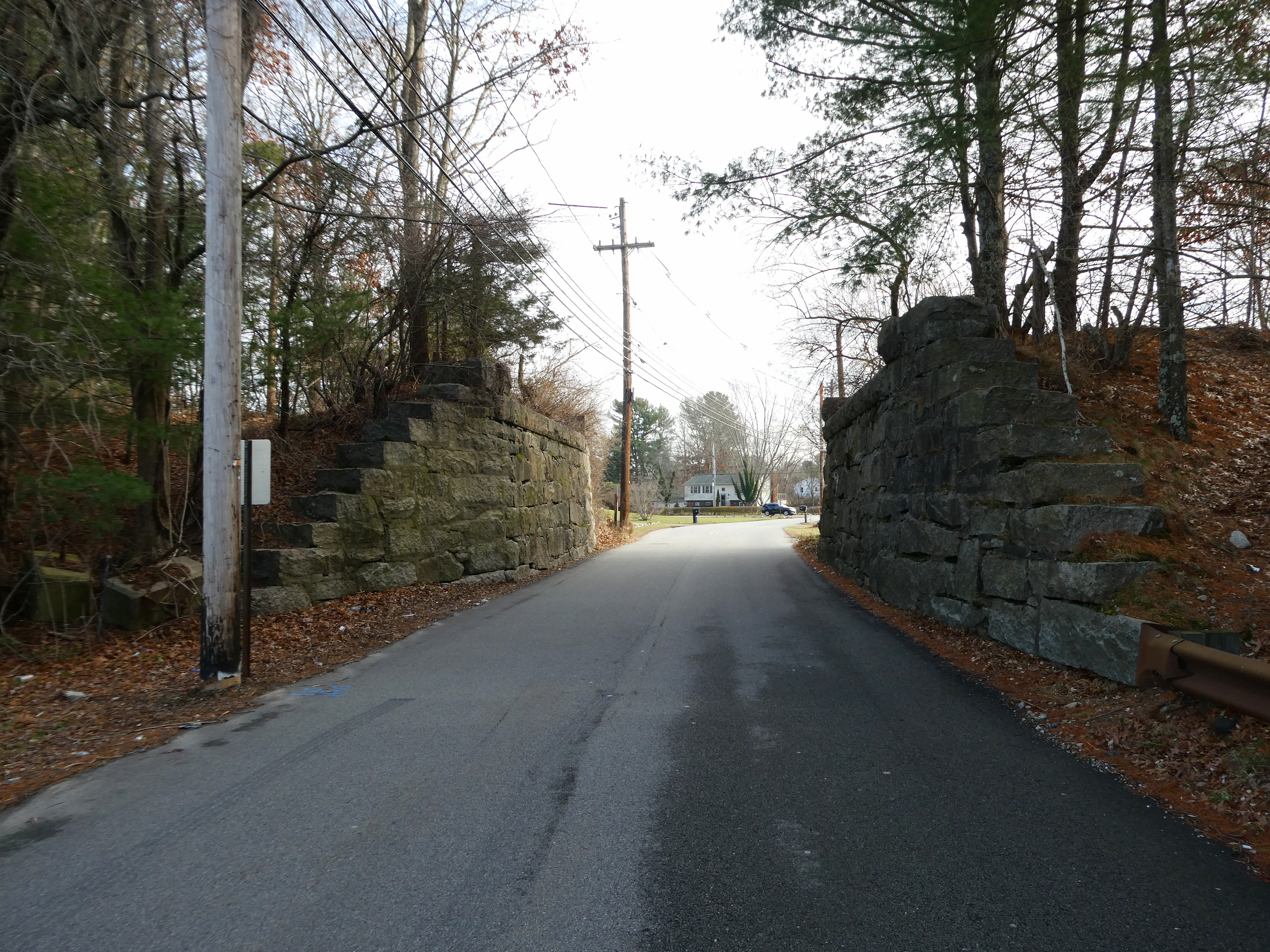
- Whittenton Branch abutments at King Phillip Street

Overview
- Status: Abandoned
- Locale: Bristol County, Massachusetts
- Termini: Whittenton Junction; Raynham Junction
- Former connections: Middleboro Secondary, Dighton and Somerset Railroad
- Stations: 3

Service
- Operator(s): Old Colony Railroad, New York, New Haven and Hartford Railroad

History
- Opened: 1882 (full length)
- Closed: 1966

Technical
- Line length: 4.8 km (3.0 mi)
- Track gauge: 4 ft 8 1/2 in (1,435 mm)

The Whittenton Branch was a short railroad branch in the state of Massachusetts that formerly connected the city of Taunton and Raynham. The 3-mile (4.8 km) branch initially opened in 1881 and was later extended to connect the New Bedford and Taunton Railroad and the Dighton and Somerset Railroad.

The branch closed in 1966; the former right-of-way is currently abandoned. The rail bed between Whittenton Junction and Whittenton Village is planned to become the Whittenton Junction Rail Trail.

== History ==
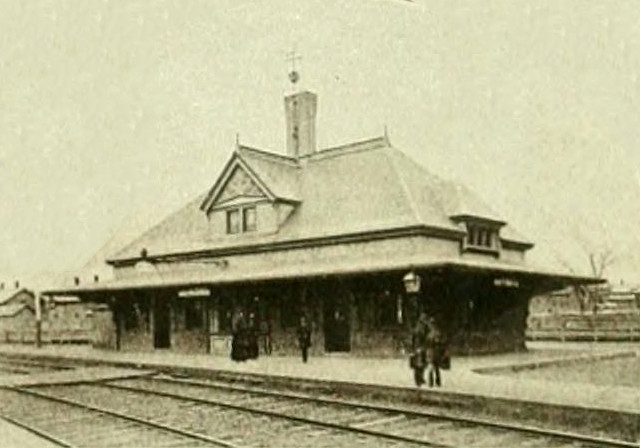
Whittenton station, circa 1889

In 1881, the Old Colony Railroad opened a connection to primarily serve the Whittenton Mills from Whittenton Junction. The following year, the line was extended to the Dighton and Somerset mainline at Raynham. It was during this time that through passenger trains between Boston and the South Coast cities of New Bedford and Fall River were rerouted onto the newly completed Whittenton Branch between Raynham and Weir Junction, which allowed all service to stop at a new Taunton Central Station. Two new stations were established on the branch- Whittenton Junction and Whittenton- along with a stop at Raynham Junction at an existing station on the D&S mainline. In 1893, the Old Colony Railroad was itself leased to the New York, New Haven and Hartford Railroad. The New Haven further consolidated service to Taunton Central; by 1895, the Fall River Line's Boat Train was the only passenger service between Raynham and Weir Junction. All passenger services through Dean Street in Taunton ended in 1897.

By 1932, the trackage between Raynham and Dean Street on the D&S mainline was removed; all rail traffic diverted onto the Whittenton Branch. All through passenger services on the Whittenton Branch ceased in 1958; freight services would continue until the full closure of the branch in 1966. The former right-of-way is currently owned by the Massachusetts Department of Transportation.

=== South Coast Rail ===
When planning for the South Coast Rail project restarted in 2005, alternatives through Attleboro and Stoughton were considered. The Stoughton alternate chosen in 2009 included two possible routing options, one of which followed the former Whittenton Branch to the former Taunton Central Station location at Oak Street; however, this resulted in longer travel times as the Whittenton Branch includes several major curves.

The Final Environmental Impact Statement, released in 2013, selected a route further east on the Dighton and Somerset mainline with Dean Street station as a downtown stop instead. The FEIS included the possibility of using the Whittenton Branch, but a station would have been built at Dana Street several blocks to the north of the Oak Street location, where the straighter track geometry would be more favorable for the construction of full-length high-level platforms. Ultimately, the Dean Street location was preferred and is planned for Phase 2 of South Coast Rail.

=== Rail trail conversion ===
Roughly half of the Whittenton Branch route between Whittenton Junction and Whittenton Village is planned to be repurposed as a rail trail. In early 2024, the city of Taunton was awarded a $52,000 grant from MassDOT for the Whittenton Junction Multi-Use Trail Study. As proposed, the trail will connect with an extension of the Norton-Mansfield Rail Trail at Whittenton Junction (adjacent to the Middleboro Secondary). The shared-use path is intended to coincide with the future redevelopment of the Whittenton Mills complex. The study was completed in February 2025.

== Route ==
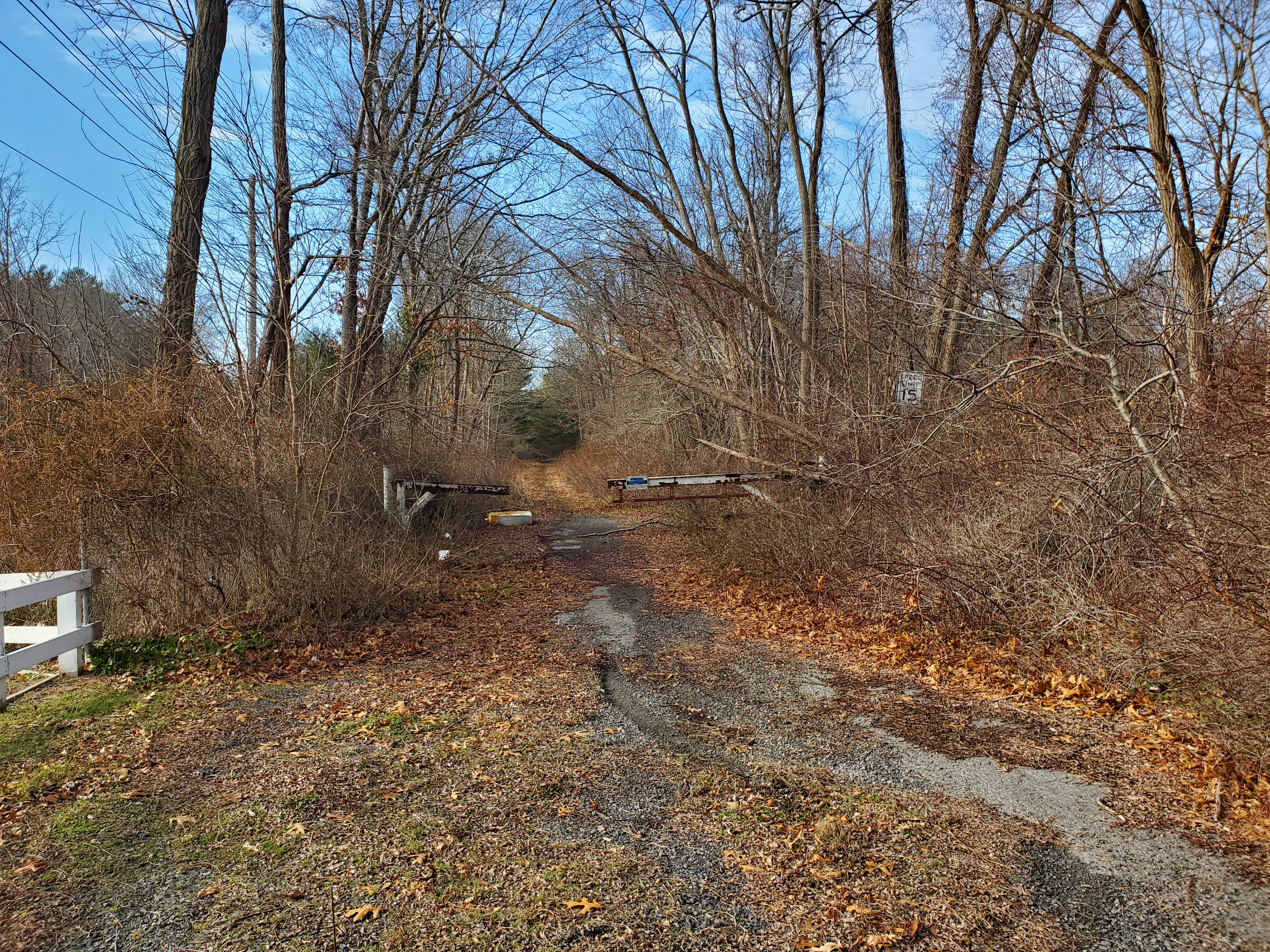
Whittenton Branch railbed west from Warren Street

The former site of Whittenton Junction wye is located along what is now MassDOT's Middleboro Secondary (which is used by CSX), roughly 300 feet (91.4 m) north of the West Britannia Street crossing in Taunton. The line continues northeast through the village of Britanniaville into Raynham; the junction with the D&S mainline is located at the former Old Colony Raynham Station site in the village of North Raynham where the line crossed Broadway.

Most of the track bed remains cleared, though no remnants of physical track infrastructure remain. Several structures are still extant along the former line which mostly consists of bridge abutments and infilled underpasses. The concrete railroad bridge that crosses the Mill River is also still extant. The route between Whittenton Village and Whittenton Junction had been repurposed as a paved haul road for a nearby quarry shortly after the line's abandonment, which has since gone out of service.

== See also ==
- New Bedford Railroad
- Middleboro Secondary
- Dighton and Somerset Railroad
