= Whittenton Mills Complex =

- U.S. National Register of Historic Places
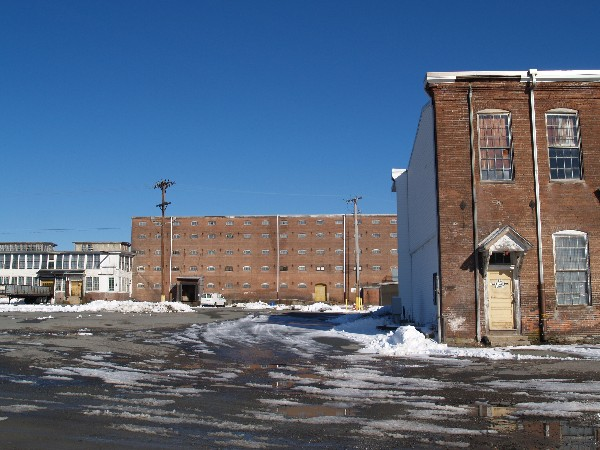

- Location within Massachusetts Location within the United States
- Location: Taunton, Massachusetts
- Coordinates: 41°55′27″N 71°6′21″W
- Built: 1805
- Architectural style: Early Commercial
- MPS: Taunton MRA
- NRHP reference No.: 84002275
- Added to NRHP: July 5, 1984

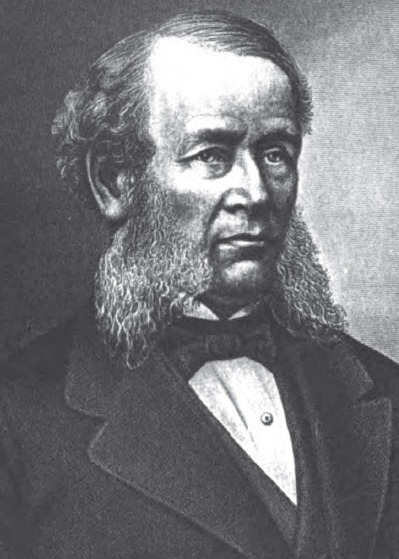
Willard Lovering

The Whittenton Mills Complex is a historic textile mill site located on Whittenton Street in Taunton, Massachusetts, on the banks of the Mill River. The site has been used for industrial purposes since 1670, when James Leonard built an iron forge on the west bank of the river. The first textile mill was built in 1805 and expanded throughout the 19th century. The complex was added to the National Register of Historic Places in 1984, and now contains various small businesses.

In October 2005, the site gained national attention when the mill's 1832 wooden dam threatened to collapse after heavy rains. More than 2,000 people were evacuated for several days while officials and work crews could shore up the dam with boulders. In 2008, scenes from the Martin Scorsese film Shutter Island, portraying the Dachau concentration camp were filmed here. As of 2012, there is an effort underway to have the dam removed entirely, and allow for restoration of the river bed. The dam was removed by 2013.

In 2024, demolition of the mill buildings began to make way for a $150 million mixed-use redevelopment project led by Greystar. The 42-acre site is set to feature a 390-unit modular apartment complex with commercial space, recreational areas, and community amenities. The development, which includes a Tax Increment Exemption agreement with the city, is expected to be completed by 2027.

== History ==
Between 1670 and 1805, the Leonard family operated a forge on the west bank of the Mill River, at was originally called Whittington. In 1805, Crocker, Bush and Richmond established a nail mill on the site. In 1807, a second story was added to the mill for the manufacture of cotton yarn. This mill was destroyed by fire on November 9, 1811, but soon rebuilt at 70 feet long by 30 feet wide, with three stories. Thomas Bush retired from the firm in 1812, which was renamed Crocker and Richmond. The first power looms were introduced in 1818.

In early 1823, Samuel Crocker and Charles Richmond organized the Taunton Manufacturing Company, along with several wealthy Boston investors. The new company operated a variety of businesses, including the manufacture of copper, iron, machinery, cotton and woolen textiles, at several sites throughout Taunton. In 1824, a new mill was built at Whittenton, on the east bank of the river, under the management of James K. Mills & Company of Boston.

A second mill was added in 1831-32. Constructed in stone, the mill contained seventy looms for the manufacture of fine cotton goods. James K. Mills & Company assumed full ownership of the property in 1835. A year later, Willard Lovering joined the new venture, and made improvements to the manufacturing facilities. The original 1811 mill was destroyed by fire in January, 1839. A new mill was soon erected, and the 1832 mill was enlarged in 1840. Lovering and his sons purchased the property after the financial Panic of 1857 in which James K. Mills & Company was ruined.

Lovering retired in 1864 and turned control of the mills over to his three sons, Charles L., William Croad, and Henry Morton Lovering. By 1883, when the company was incorporated as the Whittenton Manufacturing Company, the factory covered a site of about 15 acres, and contained over 400,000 square feet of manufacturing space, producing a variety of cotton goods, including ginghams, dress goods, fancy tickings, shirtings, flannels, and denims. The facility was powered by five Corliss engines with a total of 1,200 horsepower, and water wheels providing an additional 250 horsepower.

In 1881, the Old Colony Railroad opened the Whittenton Branch to Whittenton Mills from Whittenton Junction. The following year, the line was extended to the mainline at Raynham. A weaving shop was added to the mills in 1884.

By 1917, the Whittenton Manufacturing Company was capitalized at $600,000, with Arthur Lyman as president. It contained 45,040 spindles and 1,640 looms, and produced ginghams and blankets.

Several scenes from the movie Shutter Island were filmed here in February and March 2008. A cast of hundreds was needed to shoot the scenes, which portrayed a Nazi concentration camp.

A flea market was established on the site in 2009. It operated until January, 2012. On January 31, 2012, current owner David Murphy of Jefferson Development Partners announced plans for a Chinese firm to invest $25 Million into the complex, as part of a proposed project to convert the 42-acre site into residences and businesses. However, these plans did not materialize.

== Demolition and redevelopment ==
In 2024, demolition of the deteriorated mill buildings began to facilitate a $150 million redevelopment project by real estate firm Greystar. The plan includes 390 modular apartment units spread across ten buildings, with a mix of one-, two-, and three-bedroom units aimed at middle-income residents. The development will feature a 3,500-square-foot clubhouse, swimming pool, playground, a 0.6-mile walking and biking trail, and 1.5 acres of open space. Additionally, 10,000 square feet of retail space is planned to enhance commercial activity in the area.

To support the project, the Taunton City Council approved a $16.29 million Tax Increment Exemption (TIE) agreement, offsetting costs for environmental remediation, including brownfield contamination cleanup and asbestos removal. In return, the city expects to generate over $19 million in property taxes and additional revenue from permit fees and retail growth over the next two decades.

As of early 2025, the project remains in the permitting phase, with construction expected to begin by mid-2025 and completion projected for late 2027.

== See also ==
- Cohannet Mill No. 3
- National Register of Historic Places listings in Taunton, Massachusetts
- Old Colony Iron Works-Nemasket Mills Complex
- Reed and Barton Complex
