= Short circuit ratio =

Short circuit ratio (or SCR) has multiple meanings:

- Short circuit ratio (synchronous generator), a value used to characterize the stability of an electromechanical generator
- Short circuit ratio (electrical grid), a metric to characterize the grid strength ("stiffness").
