= Success case replication =

Success case replication, or SCR, is a methodology which claims to be able to identify, verify, and multiply successful enterprises.

The successful practitioner trains interested parties, who in turn also become trainers. SCR grew out of the "farmer-trains-farmer" method which United Nations Economic and Social Commission for Asia and the Pacific experimented with in the 1980s.
