= South Coast Rail =

Railway construction project in Massachusetts, US

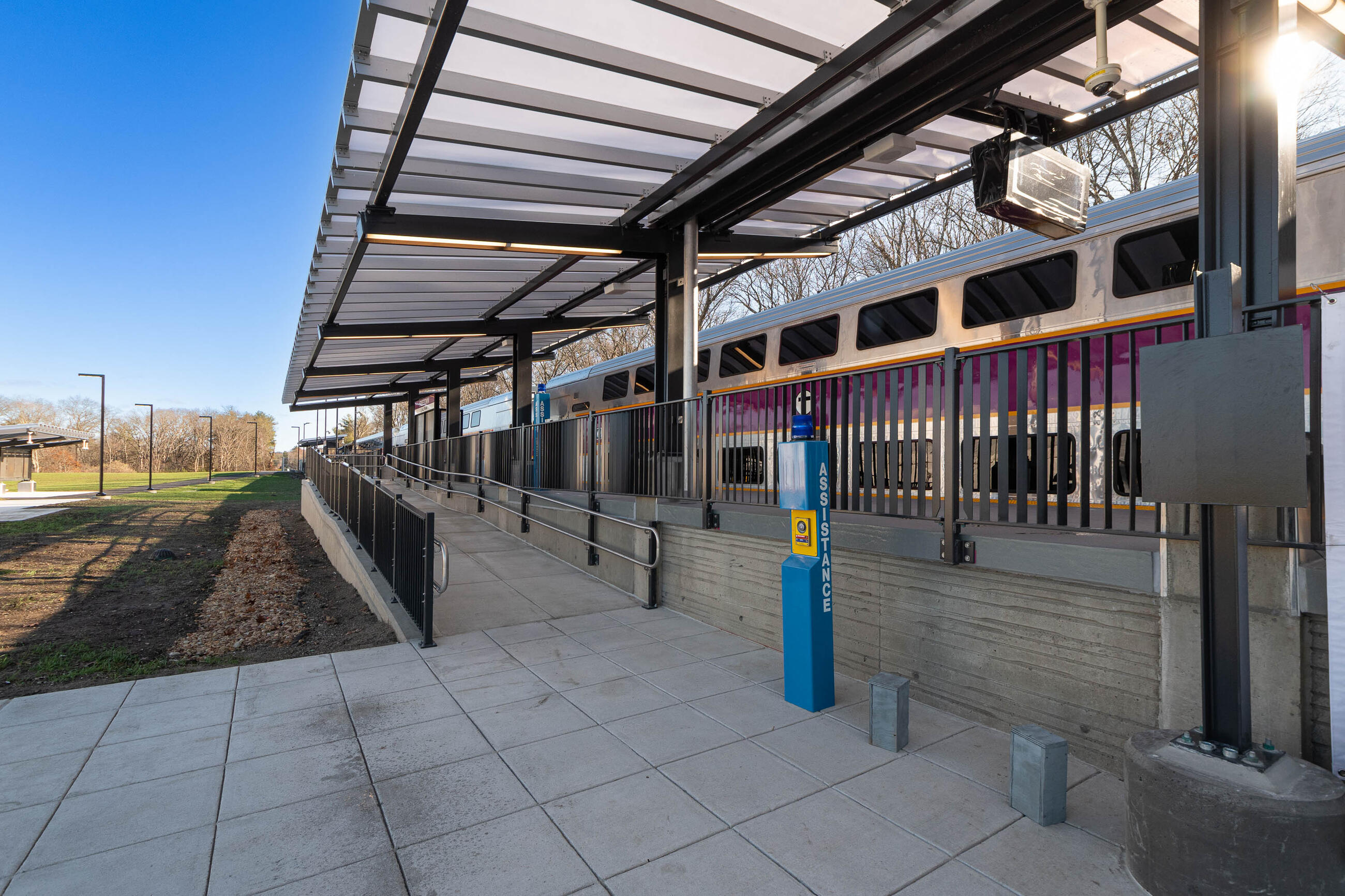
- The completed Freetown station in December 2022

Overview
- Status: Phase 1 opened; Phase 2 proposed
- Locale: Southeastern Massachusetts
- Termini: Boston South Station; Fall River; New Bedford; Battleship Cove (Phase 2)
- Stations: 6 new stations in Phase 1; 5 new stations in Phase 2

Service
- Type: Commuter rail
- System: MBTA Commuter Rail
- Daily ridership: Phase 1: 2,280 projected boardings at new stations

History
- Opened: March 24, 2025 (Phase 1)
- Closed: Previous New York, New Haven and Hartford Railroad service ended on September 5, 1958

Technical
- Track gauge: 4 ft 8 1/2 in (1,435 mm) standard gauge
- Electrification: Phase 2 only (proposed)
- Operating speed: 79 miles per hour (127 km/h)
Route map
Phase 1 Phase 2

South Coast Rail is a project to expand the MBTA Commuter Rail system into the South Coast region of Massachusetts, United States. The first phase opened on March 24, 2025, becoming part of the Fall River/New Bedford Line. It extended service from Middleborough via Taunton with branches to Fall River, and New Bedford. Six stations and two layover yards were constructed and 36.1 miles (58.1 km) of freight railroad track were rebuilt for passenger service.

Previous passenger service to the South Coast ran over four different routes: via Mansfield, via Stoughton, via Randolph, and via Middleborough. The first lines reached Taunton in 1836, New Bedford in 1840, and Fall River in 1846. The network of lines in southeastern Massachusetts was consolidated by 1888 under the Old Colony Railroad, which was in turn acquired by the New York, New Haven and Hartford Railroad in 1893. Passenger service peaked in the early 20th century and declined thereafter, with the final service to the South Coast in 1958.

The Massachusetts Bay Transportation Authority (MBTA) began planning the restoration of South Coast service in the 1980s. Feasibility studies were released in 1990 and 1995; the MBTA filed plans for a route using a new bypass near Attleboro in 1995. Environmental impact statements instead recommended a route via Stoughton, which required reactivating an abandoned section of rail line. Planning was suspended in 2002 due to increasing costs but resumed several years later. In 2010, the state purchased the rail lines from CSX Transportation. Environmental impact statements in 2011 and 2013 again recommended the Stoughton route; state officials mandated that the service be electrified.

In March 2017, the project was split into two phases due to high costs and long construction timelines. Phase 1 would provide interim diesel service to Fall River and New Bedford via Middleborough as an extension of the existing Middleborough/Lakeville Line. Phase 2 would complete the northern section of the project between Stoughton and Taunton and add electrification to the Phase 1 portion. Phase 1 construction began in 2019 with a projected cost of $1.047 billion and opened on March 24, 2025. Phase 2, which is not funded, would result in a total projected cost of $3.42 billion if built.

== Route ==
=== Phase 1 ===
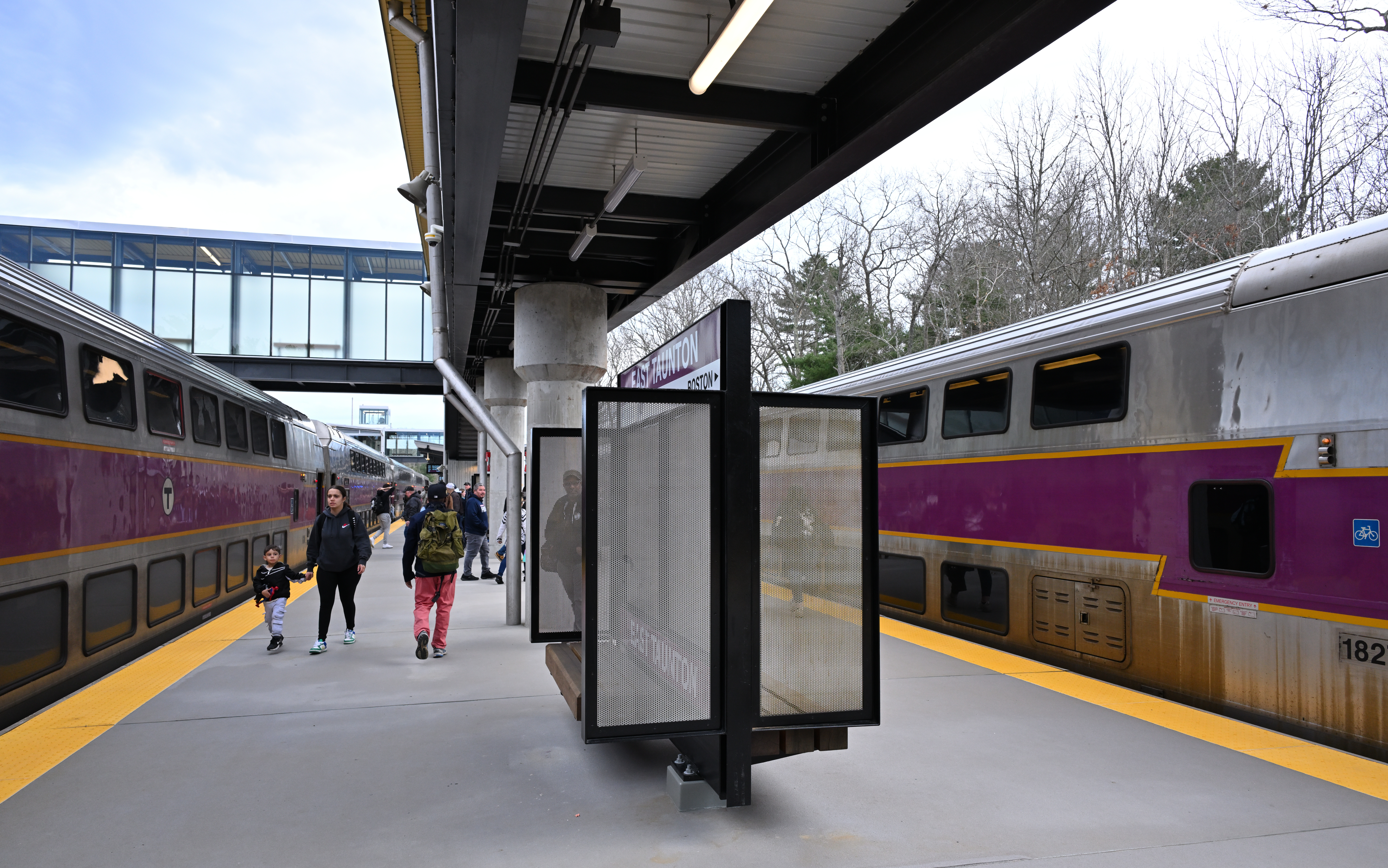
Two trains at East Taunton station

The project, primarily located in the South Coast region of Massachusetts, is split into two phases. Phase 1 opened on March 24, 2025, as part of the Fall River/New Bedford Line. It was an extension of the existing Middleborough/Lakeville Line using diesel-hauled trains. The Phase 1 routing splits from the Middleborough Main Line in downtown Middleborough, with Middleborough station replacing Middleborough/Lakeville station. It runs west along the Middleboro Secondary through Lakeville and Taunton to Cotley Junction, where it turns southeast onto the New Bedford Main Line and reaches East Taunton station. At Myricks Junction in Berkley it splits into two southern branches. The Fall River Branch follows the Fall River Secondary southwest through Freetown and Fall River, with stops at Freetown station and Fall River station. The New Bedford Branch follows the New Bedford Main Line southeast through Lakeville, Freetown, and New Bedford, with stops at Church Street station and New Bedford station.

Phase 1 added passenger service to 36.1 miles (58.1 km) of track. The 7.1-mile (11.4 km) section of the Middleboro Secondary used for the project is single track with one siding. The 4.3 miles (6.9 km) of the New Bedford Main Line between Cotley Junction and Myricks Junction are double track, while the 14.0 miles (22.5 km) between Myricks Junction and New Bedford are a mix of single and double track. The 10.7 miles (17.2 km) of the Fall River Secondary are also a mixture. Positive train control was installed on the lines for the project. Except for sidings and the Church Street–New Bedford section, the track was built to support passenger train speeds of 79 miles per hour (127 km/h). Layover yards were built at Weaver's Cove in northern Fall River and Wamsutta near the New Bedford station. The six new stations are accessible with full-length high-level platforms. Construction cost for Phase 1 was estimated as $1.047 billion in 2019 (equivalent to $1.3 billion in 2025).

=== Phase 2 ===
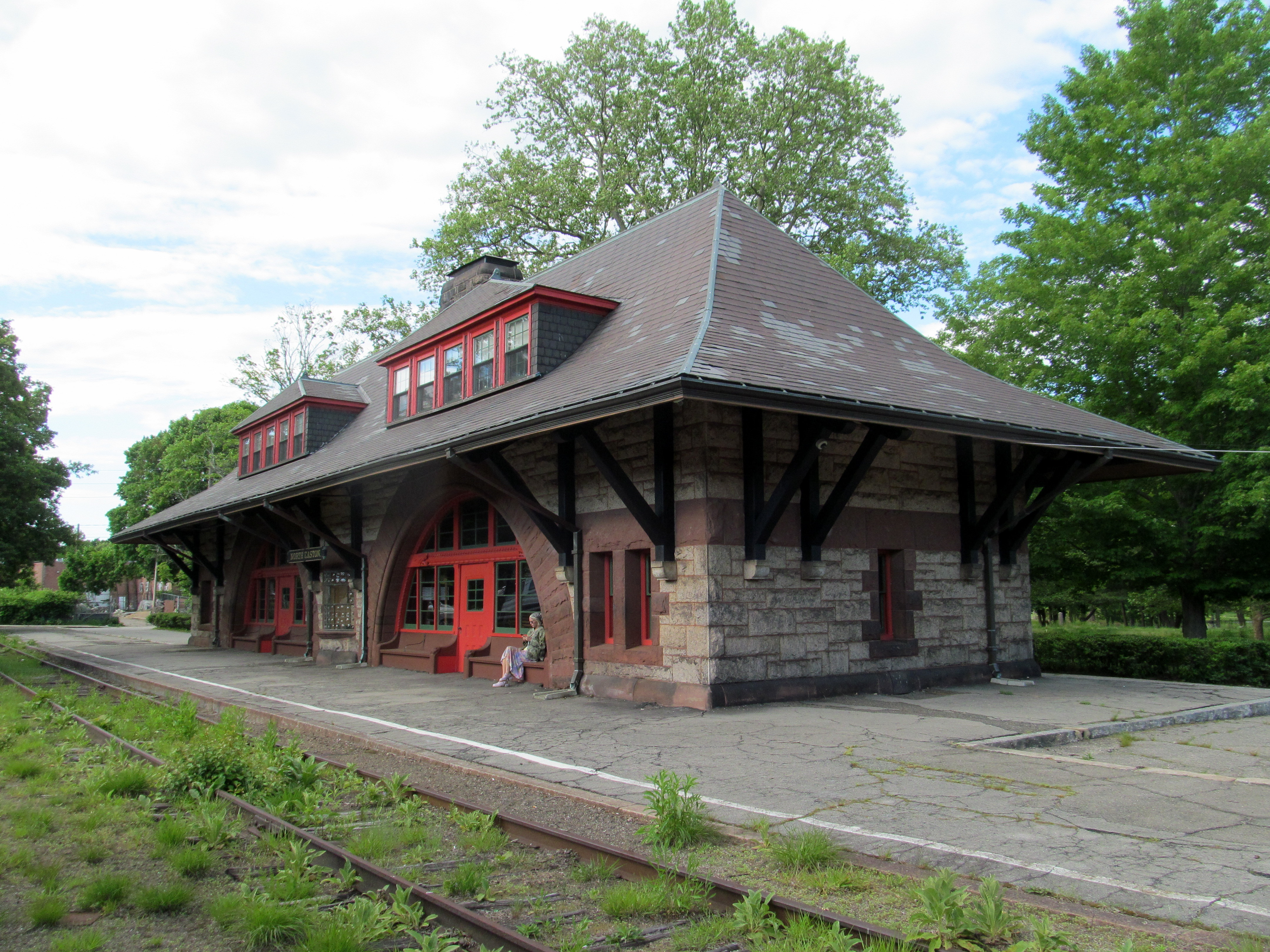
The former station building at North Easton, proposed to be the site of Easton Village station

Phase 2 ("full build"), which is proposed but not funded, would turn the South Coast lines into an extension of the Stoughton Branch of the Providence/Stoughton Line. From Stoughton station, it would run south along the former Dighton and Somerset Railroad through Easton, Raynham, and Taunton. At Weir Junction in Taunton, it would turn southeast onto the New Bedford Main Line, meeting the Phase 1 routing at Cotley Junction. New intermediate stops would be added at North Easton station, Easton Village station, Raynham Place station, and Taunton station. The Fall River Branch would also be extended south to a new Battleship Cove station. The Stoughton Branch, the new segments, and the Phase 1 segments (except for the Middleboro Secondary) would be electrified. Total cost for the both phases was estimated as $3.4 billion in 2017 (equivalent to $4.2 billion in 2025).

Unlike Phase 1, Phase 2 would involve reactivation of previously abandoned railroad right-of-way, as the portion between southern Stoughton and eastern Taunton was abandoned around the 1960s. In southern Easton and northern Raynham, the route passes through the Hockomock Swamp on a low embankment, which is partially rewilded though used by pedestrians and all-terrain vehicle riders. The swamp is a designated Area of Critical Environmental Concern and houses several endangered species including the blue-spotted salamander. An 8,500-foot (2,600 m) trestle atop the embankment is proposed to allow animals to pass under the tracks and limit the disturbance to the existing ground. The trestle would use concrete box girders on piles spaced at 50 feet (15 m), with a maintenance siding in the middle. (Note: A similar trestle was evaluated for the Pine Swamp in Raynham. It was not deemed necessary because the Pine Swamp did not have the "extraordinary wildlife habitat value" of Hockomock Swamp and did not have significant wildlife habitat on both sides of the right-of-way.)

== Previous service ==
=== Expansion ===
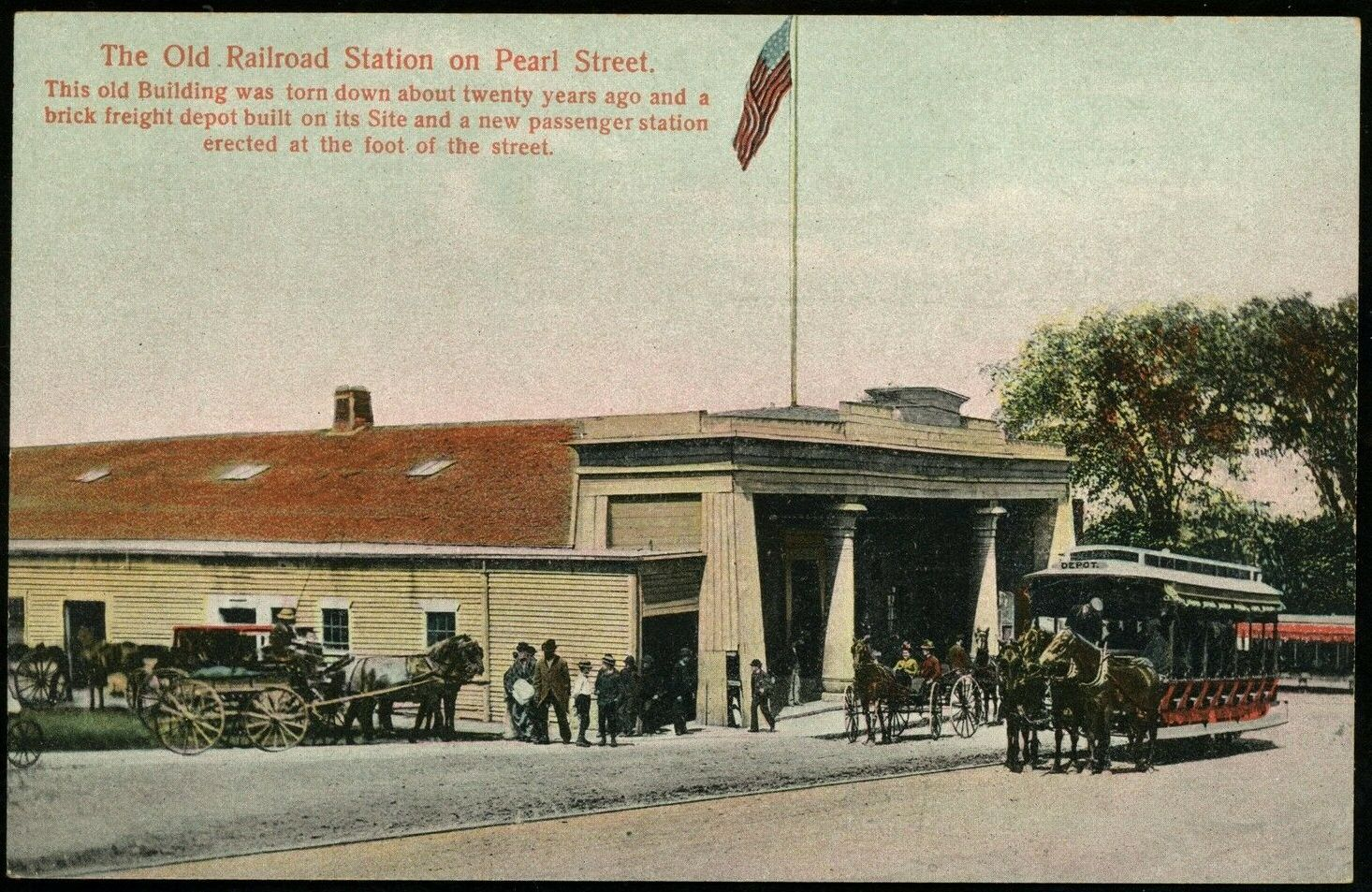
The first station in New Bedford

Previous passenger service to the South Coast ran over four different routes: via Mansfield, via Stoughton, via Randolph, and via Middleborough. The first rail line to reach the area was the Taunton Branch Railroad, which connected with the Boston and Providence Railroad (B&P) at Mansfield. It opened to Taunton in August 1836; a closely affiliated extension, the New Bedford and Taunton Railroad, opened to New Bedford in July 1840. The Middleborough and Taunton Railroad opened in July 1856; it connected with the New Bedford and Taunton at Cotley Junction south of Taunton.

The first segment of what would become the Fall River Railroad opened from Myricks (on the New Bedford and Taunton) to Fall River on June 9, 1845. The rest of the line opened in 1846 from Myricks through Middleborough to South Braintree on the Old Colony Railroad, creating a second route from Fall River to Boston. The next year, owner Richard Borden founded the Fall River Line, which operated New York–Fall River steamship service. It connected with the "Boat Train" on the Fall River Railroad to provide New York–Boston through service. The Old Colony Railroad and the Fall River Railroad merged in 1854 as the Old Colony and Fall River Railroad. It merged with the Newport and Fall River Railroad in 1863 to become the Old Colony and Newport Railway, then with the Cape Cod Railroad in 1872 to become the Old Colony Railroad.

The Stoughton Branch Railroad opened in April 1845 from Stoughton to Canton Junction on the B&P. An extension, the Easton Branch Railroad, opened to North Easton on May 16, 1855. In 1863, the Dighton and Somerset Railroad began construction on a line between Somerset Junction (north of Fall River) and Braintree Highlands – both on the Old Colony and Newport – via Taunton, North Easton, and Randolph. The Old Colony and Newport purchased the potential competitor in 1865 and opened it on September 24, 1866. It used the Easton Branch Railroad between North Easton and Stoughton Junction (south of Stoughton); passenger service ended between Stoughton and Stoughton Junction. The new route via Randolph was shorter than the Middleborough and Mansfield routes; it became the Old Colony's primary Fall River–Boston routing.

=== Consolidation ===
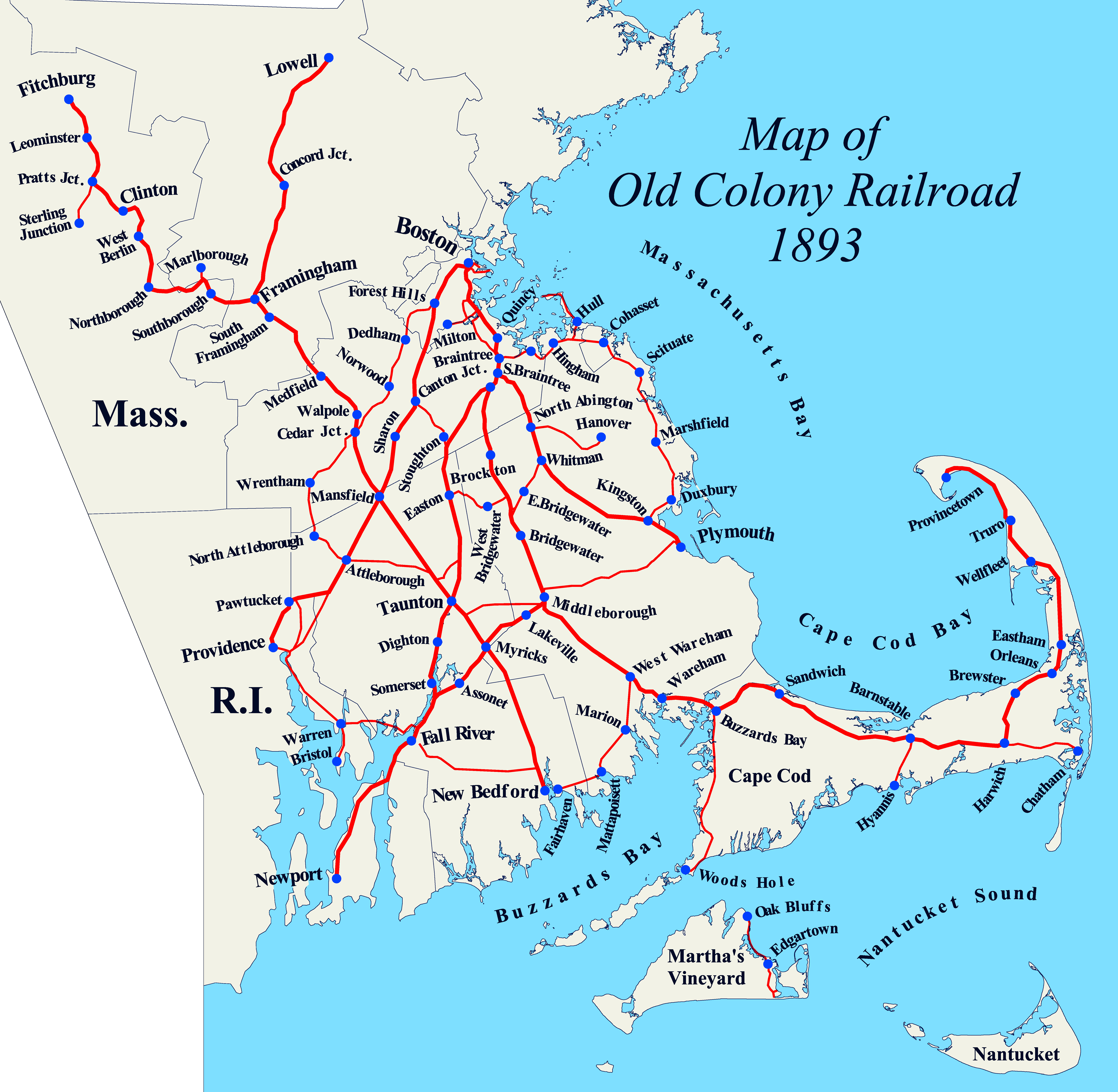
Old Colony Railroad network in 1893

The Taunton Branch Railroad opened a branch from Attleboro Junction (west of Taunton) to Attleboro in 1871. The company merged with the New Bedford and Taunton in 1874 as the New Bedford Railroad. The Old Colony acquired the Middleborough and Taunton Railroad in 1874 and a successor of the New Bedford Railroad in 1879. Around 1882, the Old Colony opened the Whittenton Branch between Whittenton Junction (near Attleboro Junction) and Raynham. It allowed trains on the Dighton and Somerset to serve Taunton Central station rather than Dean Street station, thus consolidating Taunton's passenger services at a single station.

The Old Colony acquired the B&P in 1888, consolidating all the railways in southeastern Massachusetts under a single owner. The company expanded Mansfield–New Bedford service and routed some Fall River and New Bedford trains via Stoughton at times. The New York, New Haven and Hartford Railroad (New Haven) leased the Old Colony in 1893. By 1898, daily South Coast service via Mansfield included six Taunton–Boston round trips and one New Bedford–Boston round trip plus nine New Bedford–Mansfield round trips that connected with Boston trains at Mansfield. Service via Randolph included one Taunton–Boston round trip and four Newport–Fall River–Boston round trips. There were three Fall River–Boston round trips via Middleborough.

The opening of South Station in 1898 allowed increases in through service; by 1906; eleven of the fourteen daily New Bedford–Mansfield round trips ran to and from Boston. Service timed for Boston commuting had been available from Taunton and New Bedford via Mansfield since around 1885. Fall River never had a strong commuter market to Boston; commuter service via Middleborough was available for several years starting in 1915. Commuter service via Randolph never ran further south than North Easton.

=== Decline ===
Cutbacks to service began during World War I and continued thereafter. Service between Mansfield and New Bedford was reduced sharply to five daily round trips, and Fall River service via Middleborough dwindled. The New Haven resumed running South Coast trains via Stoughton during and after the war. Use of the Randolph route ended around 1924. By 1927, all service to New Bedford and Fall River ran via Stoughton, save for a single Fall River round trip that ran via Middleborough until 1931. Service on the southern part of the Dighton and Somerset ended in 1932, with Fall River service routed via Myricks thereafter.

South Coast service was rerouted via Mansfield in 1937 during the early stages of the 88 stations case, which also brought the end of service south of Fall River in 1938. Fall River service was reduced to Taunton shuttles during World War II. New Bedford service was reduced to three round trips in March 1949, and the Fall River shuttles were discontinued that September. Most New Bedford service was routed via Stoughton in 1950; both routes were used for several years. Fall River shuttles resumed in June 1952.

All service was routed via Stoughton in 1955 when a grade separation project at Mansfield cut the branch line. By that time there were three New Bedford–Boston round trips – one with a Fall River shuttle – and one Fall River–Boston trip. That remaining service ended on September 5, 1958, as the New Haven cut its unprofitable Old Colony Division; the remaining passenger service on the division ended the next year. Freight service to the South Coast continued, though the remainder of the Dighton and Somerset was abandoned in the 1960s and 1970s. The New Haven merged in late 1968 into Penn Central, which merged into Conrail in 1976. Passenger service continued on the ex-B&P, including the Stoughton Branch, eventually becoming the Providence/Stoughton Line.

== South Coast Rail planning ==
=== Restoration planning (1980s–2003) ===
The Massachusetts Bay Transportation Authority (MBTA) was formed in 1964 to subsidize suburban rail service and build rapid transit extensions. The MBTA purchased the Old Colony mainline between Boston and Braintree in 1965 for the construction of the Braintree Branch of the Red Line. Contraction of the New Haven's Boston commuter service largely ended after 1967; expansion of service frequency and area began in the late 1970s. In 1970, following revolts against freeways in the urban core, Massachusetts governor Francis Sargent placed a moratorium on new highway construction inside the Route 128 beltway. The resulting cancellation of the Southwest Expressway by the Boston Transportation Planning Review meant the already-overcrowded Southeast Expressway would continue to be the only highway into Boston from the south. The MBTA purchased many of the Penn Central suburban lines in January 1973. These included the ex-B&P lines, the disused line from Stoughton to Whittenton Junction via Raynham, and part of the Middleborough Main Line.

In the 1980s, the restoration of the lines to New Bedford and Fall River was proposed. Since the routes via Mansfield and Randolph and the Middleborough–Myricks segment of the Middleborough route were abandoned and built over, three possible routes to the South Coast were placed under consideration: the Stoughton route, a route following the Northeast Corridor to near Attleboro and then branching onto the Attleboro Secondary, and a route following the Middleborough Main Line to Middleborough then the Middleboro Secondary westwards. All three routes used the same lines from Taunton south to Fall River and New Bedford. By 1988, the MBTA was tentatively planning to extend service to Taunton via Stoughton. The first major study, completed in January 1990, concluded that the Stoughton Branch was the most viable route. The study was criticized for not considering other alternatives, including express buses. A May 1991 bond bill included $3 million (equivalent to $6 million in 2025) for planning the extension.

In 1991, the state agreed to build a set of transit projects as part of an agreement with the Conservation Law Foundation (CLF), which had threatened a lawsuit over auto emissions from the Central Artery/Tunnel Project (Big Dig). Among these projects was the "Old Colony Commuter Rail Line Extension", to be complete by the end of 1996. This included the Middleborough/Lakeville Line and Plymouth/Kingston Line, which opened in 1997, plus the 2007-opened Greenbush Line. Planning for service to the South Coast continued. The March 1995 Expanded Feasibility Study analyzed routes absent from the 1990 report. The 1965–1980 construction of the Braintree Branch had only left space for a single track (intended for freight use) on the Old Colony mainline through parts of Dorchester and Quincy. This limited the capacity required for reaching the South Coast via Middleborough: service could be operated to one of Fall River and New Bedford, but not both. The report concluded that both the Stoughton and Attleboro routes would be viable and that a partial Stoughton Branch extension to North Easton would be most cost-effective.

Map of the Attleboro Bypass proposal

In September 1995, the MBTA filed plans with the Environmental Protection Agency (EPA) for service via the Attleboro route. It was to include a 3-mile (4.8 km) 'Attleboro Bypass' on new right-of-way connecting the Northeast Corridor to the Attleboro Secondary northeast of downtown Attleboro. The project was to be completed in 2000 at a cost of $156 million (equivalent to $301 million in 2025). In August 1996, Governor Bill Weld signed a bill giving $136 million (equivalent to $257 million in 2025) to commuter rail expansion, while the state legislature directed the MBTA to further study alternatives. The 1997 Expanded Alternatives Analysis showed vastly increased costs — $407 million (equivalent to $757 million in 2025) via Attleboro, $410 million ($763 million) via Stoughton, or $436 million ($811 million) via Middleborough. Service via Middleborough would also require double-tracking on the Old Colony mainline at additional cost. The report recommended the Stoughton route as the most cost-effective due to its high ridership.

A groundbreaking ceremony was held in October 1998 after a contract for bridge work in Fall River and New Bedford was awarded that month. Based on an analysis of South Station operations, the July 1999 Draft Environmental Impact Report concluded that the Stoughton route was the only viable route. It projected 4,325 daily riders with 20 trains per day to each of Fall River and New Bedford. In January 2000, following then-governor Paul Cellucci's reapproval, the state reported that construction would begin in late 2002 and last until 2004. The Draft Environmental Statement certificate was received in November 2000; the EPA confirmed that Stoughton was the only practical route but required a Final Environmental Impact Statement (FEIS).

The FEIS was released in April 2002 and approved in August. The state's approval required the Southeastern Regional Planning and Economic Development District (SRPEDD) to establish a Growth Task Force. In July 2002, the MBTA revised the project cost to $600 million (equivalent to $1025 million in 2025) with an opening date of 2007. Due to the increasing costs, the MBTA suspended the Growth Task Force and stopped project planning in November 2002; the environmental approval process was stopped in May 2003.

=== Restoration planning (2005–2014) ===
The SRPEDD restarted the Growth Task Force in October 2004 even though the MBTA was still conducting its review of the project. In March 2005, Governor Mitt Romney allowed the project to proceed and allocated $670 million (equivalent to $1 billion in 2025) for the project, which was then projected to open between 2011 and 2013. The Chief of Commonwealth Development stated in June 2005 that the cost could be as high as $1 billion (equivalent to $1.6 billion in 2025). In April 2007, the Massachusetts Executive Office of Transportation released South Coast Rail: A Plan For Action, which restarted the planning process from the beginning. The plan estimated project costs at $1.435 billion (equivalent to $2 billion in 2025), including $163 million ($243 million) for procuring additional rolling stock and $31.4 million ($47 million) for expanding South Station, with opening in December 2016.

The Phase 1 Alternatives Analysis Report, released in April 2008, narrowed 65 options (including unlikely modes like heavy rail metro and monorail) to five plausible alternatives: the Attleboro, Stoughton, and Middleboro routes, a mixture of Attleboro and Middleboro service, and express bus service. The Massachusetts Department of Transportation (MassDOT) released 18 potential station sites for the project in September 2008. In May 2008, MassDOT issued a formal request to the US Army Corps of Engineers to allow discharge of fill materials into wetlands — effectively starting the formal environmental review process. A federal Notice of Intent and state Environmental Notification Form were filed in November 2008.

On October 2, 2008, the state government announced an agreement with CSX Transportation for the purchase and upgrade of several of CSX's freight lines in the state. CSX agreed to sell its lines from Taunton to Fall River and New Bedford for use by the South Coast Rail project, as well as the Grand Junction Branch, the Framingham-to-Worcester section of the Worcester Line, and the South Boston Running Track. Other parts of the agreement included plans for double-stack freights west of Worcester and the abandonment of Beacon Park Yard. The agreement was signed on September 23, 2009. On June 11, 2010, the state and CSX completed the first phase of the agreement, including the transfer of the South Coast Rail lines to MassDOT.

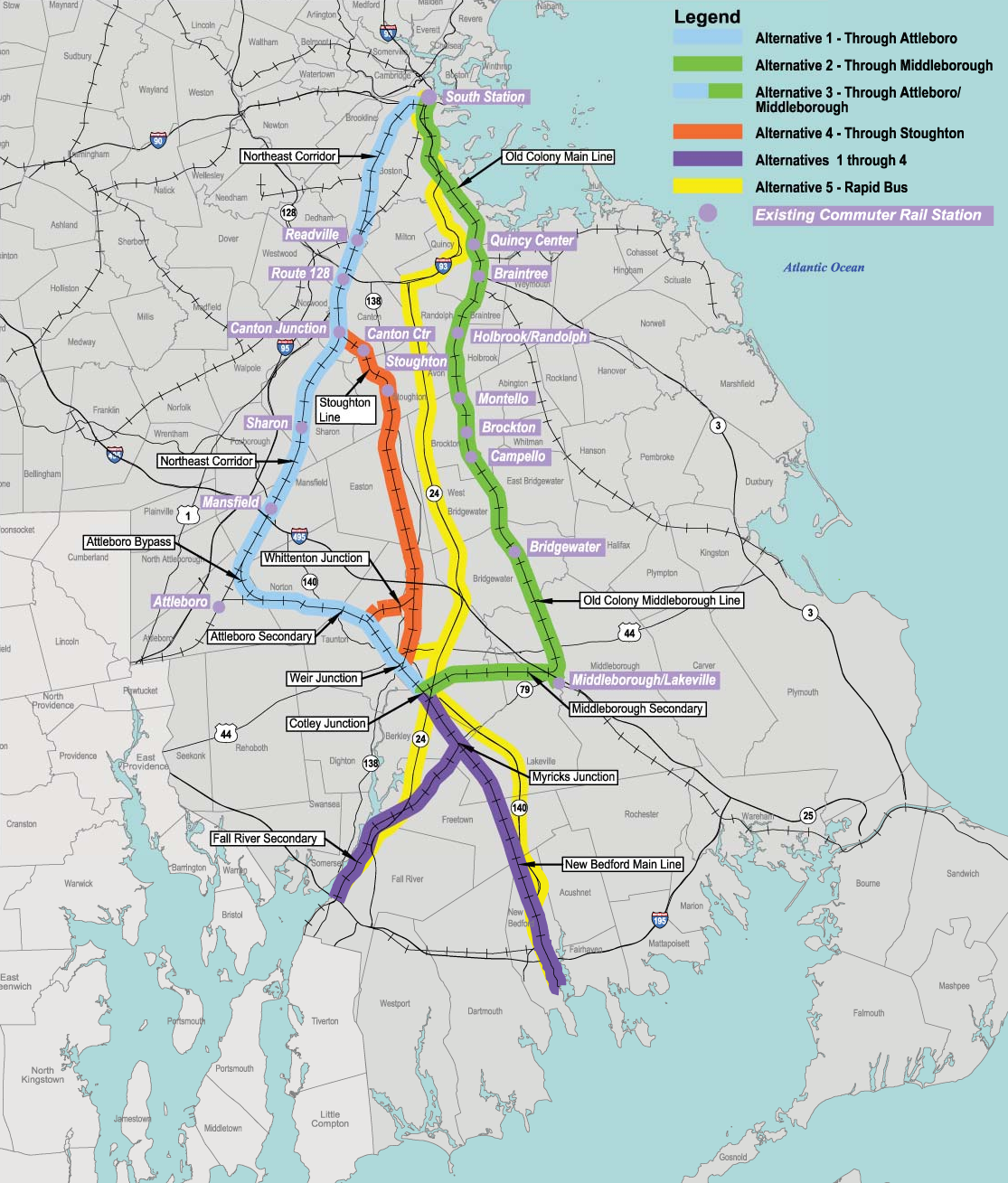
The alternatives considered in 2009: Attleboro route Stoughton and Whittenton routes Middleborough route Route common to all rail alternatives Rapid bus

In a May 2009 interview, Commonwealth Treasurer Tim Cahill stated that "it is virtually going to be impossible" for the state to complete the project in 2016 as planned due to the recession, adding that federal funding was unlikely to be obtained because "[t]he federal government doesn't trust us anymore because of the Big Dig." The state released the South Coast Rail Economic Development and Land Use Corridor Plan, which called for substantial mixed-use transit-oriented development around stations, in June 2009. The Phase 2 Alternatives Analysis Report, which indicated electric or diesel service through Stoughton as the best choice, was released in September 2009.

The Army Corps of Engineers released the Draft Environmental Impact Statement (DEIS) in March 2011. Concurring with previous documents it recommended that South Coast Rail be routed through Stoughton, citing in particular the need to add a billion-dollar fourth track from Back Bay to Forest Hills to accommodate service through Attleboro. (Note: Service via Stoughton would be an extension of existing Stoughton Branch service, whereas service via Attleboro would be a new service and thus add additional trains using the Northeast Corridor.) The variation using the Whittenton Branch between Raynham and Taunton was not recommended due to noise and grade crossing impacts in downtown Taunton as well as longer running times. The DEIS evaluated both diesel and electric service. Electric service was projected to have faster travel times (73–76 minutes versus 83–85) due to the higher acceleration and top speed of electric trains, with higher ridership (9,580 daily riders versus 8,140) and improved air quality. However, it was projected to cost $1.88 billion versus $1.48 billion for diesel service (equivalent to $2.65 billion versus $2.09 billion in 2025), with the increased cost from the overhead wire infrastructure as well as the need to buy electric locomotives and new coaches capable of 100 mph (160 km/h) operation. (Note: Existing coaches were limited to 80 mph (130 km/h) even on sections of the Northeast Corridor rated for 150 mph (240 km/h).)

Certification from state environmental officials was received in June 2011. In the certificate, Secretary Rick Sullivan directed MassDOT to focus on the electric alternative because it would have improved air quality. A state transportation funding bill passed in July 2013 mentioned South Coast Rail as deserving funding but did not specifically allocate money to the project. In September 2013, the Army Corps of Engineers released the Final Environmental Impact Statement. It made small changes to several station sites and selected locations for layover yards. The projected cost for electric service was revised slightly downward to $1.817 billion (equivalent to $2.87 billion in 2025). A spending bill passed in April 2014 allocated $2.3 billion (equivalent to $3.1 billion in 2025) for South Coast Rail. On June 18, 2014, MassDOT awarded a one-year, $12 million contract (equivalent to $16 million in 2025) – with up to $210 million (equivalent to $281 million in 2025) possible over 10 years – to a joint venture between Vanasse Hangen Brustlin, Inc. and HNTB for "program management, early design development, and environmental permitting".

=== Project changes (2016–2021) ===
In June 2016, the MBTA announced that the project cost had been revised to $3.42 billion (equivalent to $4 billion in 2025), with completion not expected until 2030. The substantial delay and increase in cost caused officials to consider alternate plans, including an interim service to New Bedford via Middleborough. Some local and regional officials objected to that plan, as it would have reduced service to Middleborough/Lakeville station and potentially interfered with Plymouth/Kingston Line and Greenbush Line service. Design for the Stoughton route was 15% complete by that time. In March 2017, the state announced a revised plan intended to provide service sooner than 2030. The $1.1 billion Phase 1 (equivalent to $1.4 billion in 2025) would follow the Middleborough route and open in 2024; Phase 2 would follow the original route through Stoughton (including electrification) and open in 2029.

By June 2017, the planned completion dates were changed to Phase 1 in 2022 and Phase 2 in 2030, with stations at Freetown and Battleship Cove in Phase 1 rather than Phase 2 as proposed in March. The two-phase approach attracted criticism from several directions, including some of those who had previously advocated for the project as well as previous opponents. Middleborough and Lakeville officials were critical of the possibility of abandoning the existing Middleborough/Lakeville station, which had attracted transit-oriented development, or requiring its riders to take a shuttle train, as well as possible traffic issues from a downtown Middleborough station. The New Bedford mayor and transit advocates were critical of the longer travel times of the Middleborough routing, and the Taunton mayor was critical of Phase 1 lacking the downtown Taunton station of the previous plan. Stoughton, Easton, and Raynham officials continued their previous opposition to South Coast Rail.

The Draft Supplemental Environmental Impact Report (DSEIR) was released in January 2018. It determined that a new station would be built at Middleborough to replace Middleborough/Lakeville, and that East Taunton station would be built instead of Taunton station, as serving Middleborough/Lakeville or Taunton would require time-consuming reverse moves. Battleship Cove station was moved back to Phase 2. The DSEIR predicted a net increase of 3,000 daily boardings (1,500 round trips), with 2,280 daily boardings at the six new stations versus 760 at the existing Middleborough/Lakeville station. The 1,610 projected daily boardings at the non-Middleborough stations were 41% of the 3,960 projected for Phase 2, leading to criticisms from public officials about the cost effectiveness of the project. The Final Supplemental Environmental Impact Report was released in April 2018.

Design work and permitting were largely complete by March 2019. In April 2019, the state announced that a funding plan and Army Corps of Engineers permits for the Phase 1 plan were in place and that the project would proceed "full speed ahead," with a target of late 2023 for revenue service. Projected cost was $1.047 billion (equivalent to $1.3 billion in 2025). A transportation bond bill that included $825 million (equivalent to $1010 million in 2025) for Phase 1 was filed in July 2019 and passed in January 2021.

== Phase 1 construction ==
=== Early work ===
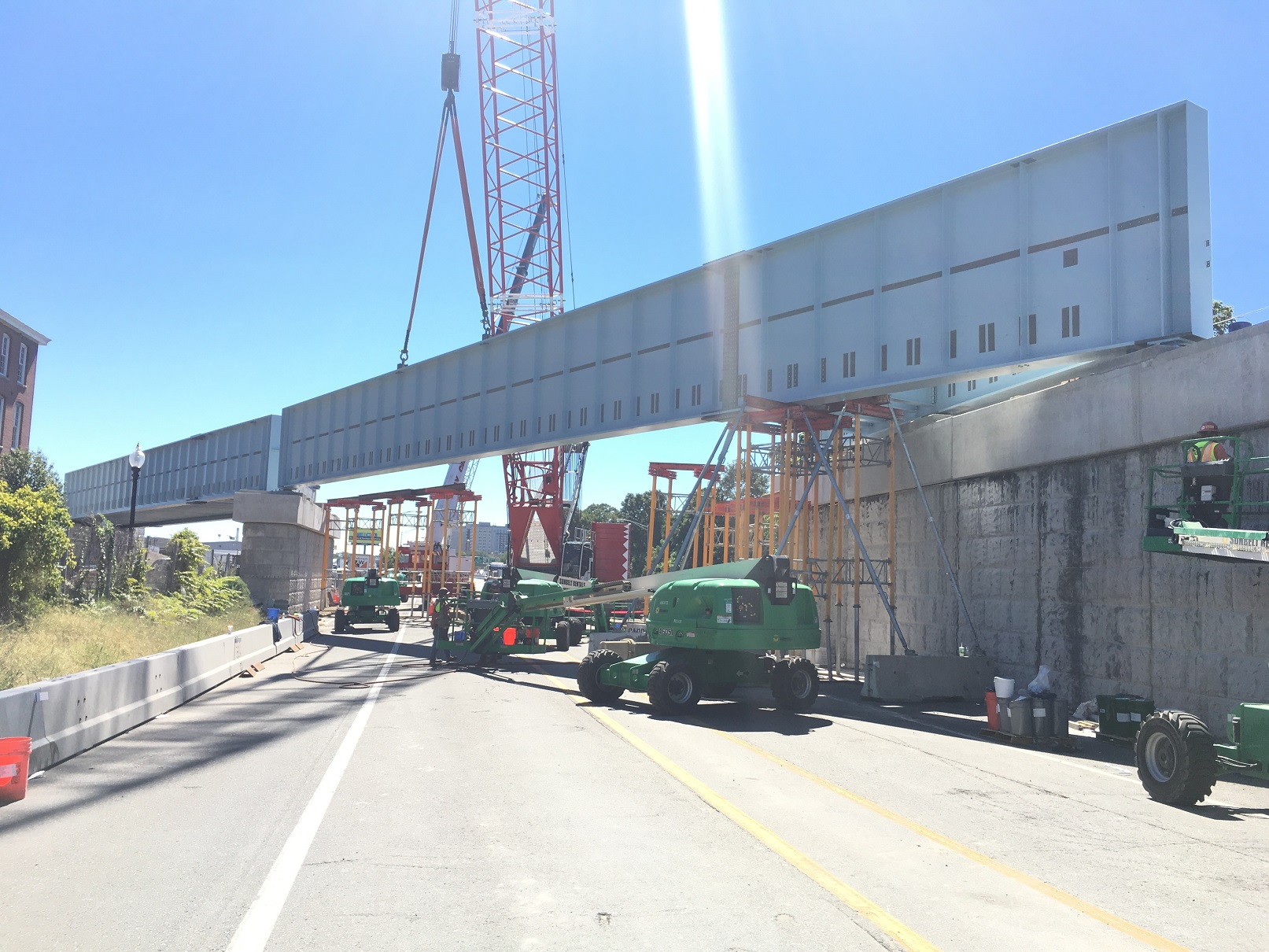
Bridge replacement in New Bedford in 2016

Several elements of the project were constructed prior to the main construction phases. In February 2010, MassDOT received a $20 million TIGER grant (equivalent to $29 million in 2025) to replace three bridges in New Bedford built around 1907, for immediate freight use and future South Coast Rail service. The grant represented part of the $71.4 million (equivalent to $104 million in 2025) the state had applied for to fund the Fast Track New Bedford project, which would have also included a fourth bridge, construction of New Bedford station with an adjacent bus terminal, and pedestrian and bicycle access improvements. The MBTA awarded the contract in August 2010; the replacement bridges opened for Massachusetts Coastal Railroad freight use in November 2011.

In 2013 and 2014, MassDOT replaced 42,000 ties along 33 miles (53 km) of the Fall River and New Bedford branches. A $18.4 million, two-year contract (equivalent to $25 million in 2025) was issued on October 22, 2014 for reconstruction of six grade crossings in Taunton, Freetown, and New Bedford. On November 25, 2014, a $42 million contract (equivalent to $56 million in 2025) was awarded for the replacement of three bridges (President Avenue, Brownell Avenue, and Golf Club Road) in Fall River plus the Wamsutta Street bridge in New Bedford. The bridges were completed in early 2017.

=== Contracts ===
Phase 1 was divided into eight major construction contracts. Land acquisition and three "early action" contracts began while design proceeded for other work. Contract No. 1 for 57 turnouts was awarded to Progress Rail on December 14, 2018. Completion of the $9.8 million contract (equivalent to $12 million in 2025) was scheduled for February 2021. Contract No. 2 included the reconstruction of 46 culverts, cleaning 16 additional culverts and removal of one more, reconstruction of one grade crossing, and construction of six wetland impact mitigation areas. The $18.3 million contract (equivalent to $23 million in 2025) was awarded to J.F. White on March 6, 2019, with completion expected in June 2020.

Contract No. 3 included replacement of four railroad bridges and one culvert, plus 2.5 miles (4.0 km) of track replacement. The $26.1 million contract (equivalent to $32 million in 2025) was awarded to J.F. White, with completion planned for November 2020. While MassDOT managed the early action contracts, oversight of the program was transferred to the MBTA in preparation for the start of Phase 1 construction in 2019. That April, the MBTA awarded a $62 million contract (equivalent to $77 million in 2025) to AECOM for program and construction management. A groundbreaking ceremony was held on July 2, 2019.

On May 11, 2020, the MBTA awarded contract No. 7 to Skanska DW White JV for the Fall River Secondary portion of Phase 1. The $159 million contract (equivalent to $195 million in 2025) included construction of two stations, 12.1 miles (19.5 km) of track work, rehabilitation of ten grade crossings and eight bridges, and construction of Weaver's Cove Layover. Construction was estimated to take 30 months. Contract No. 6 included 24.1 miles (38.8 km) of track work on the Middleboro Secondary and New Bedford Secondary, four stations, the Wamsutta Layover, seven bridges, and associated infrastructure. It also included signal and communication systems for the whole project area. The $403.5 million contract (equivalent to $494 million in 2025) was awarded to SCR Constructors (a joint venture of The Middlesex Corporation and Tutor Perini) on August 24, 2020; construction began later in 2020 and was estimated to take 37 months.

Contract No. 10 was for construction of a footbridge over Route 18 at New Bedford station. The $21.3 million contract (equivalent to $23 million in 2025) was awarded to Barletta Heavy Division in December 2022. Contract No. 12 was for traffic mitigation during construction, including intersection and traffic signal modifications. The $8.5 million contract (equivalent to $9 million in 2025) was awarded to Newport Construction in early 2022. Replacement of a bridge carrying Route 24 over the New Bedford Secondary in East Taunton was originally planned to be Contract No. 5. It was combined with a larger MassDOT bridge replacement project on Route 24, which also included replacement of the Route 24 bridge over the Middleborough Secondary. The contract was awarded to Cardi Corporation in January 2021, with work expected to last until 2027.

=== Construction and opening ===
By May 2021, Fall River Secondary work was 20% complete, while Middleborough Secondary/New Bedford Main Line work was 5% complete. Progress was at 35% and 18% by November 2021. In 2022, granite blocks from culverts and bridge abutments replaced during the project were dumped into Nantucket Sound off Yarmouth and Harwich to create artificial reefs. Overall project completion reached the halfway point in mid-2022. By August 2022, Fall River Secondary work was 81% complete, while Middleborough Secondary/New Bedford Main Line work was 53% complete. In the November 2022 election, both Fall River and New Bedford voted to join the MBTA funding district, a prerequisite for service.

Substantial completion of the Fall River Secondary work was announced with a ribbon-cutting ceremony in December 2022; at that point, revenue service was still planned for late 2023. In September 2023, the MBTA indicated that revenue service would not begin until mid-2024. New Bedford Secondary work was 85% complete by that time. In April 2024, the MBTA acknowledged that a midyear opening was unlikely, but did not provide a new schedule. The delay was attributed to systems testing and the construction of East Taunton station both taking longer than expected. Test trains began operating on June 17, 2024. That month, the MBTA announced that the planned opening had been delayed again to May 2025.

In July 2024, the MBTA indicated that weekend service would operate on the lines. Automatic train control testing on the South Coast Rail lines was completed in July 2024. Dispatching for the lines shifted from Massachusetts Coastal Railroad to Keolis (the MBTA Commuter Rail operator) in August 2024. Operations and maintenance shifted to Keolis on January 6, 2025, following the December 2024 completion of positive train control testing. This allowed Keolis to begin crew qualification and later to run simulated service.

On February 7, 2025, the MBTA announced that Phase 1 service would begin on March 24 pending final approval by the Federal Railroad Administration (FRA). MassDOT formally transferred ownership of the lines to the MBTA in late February. The FRA did not give final regulatory approval until March 21, 2025. Service began on March 24, 2025, as the Fall River/New Bedford Line. The Southeastern Regional Transit Authority did not modify its bus routes for the new stations, instead piloting a microtransit service. The months after the extension saw several service quality issues. Most were due to crew shortages and other temporary problems, though the MBTA also cited difficulty coordinating trains on the mostly-single-track line as a cause of performance issues.

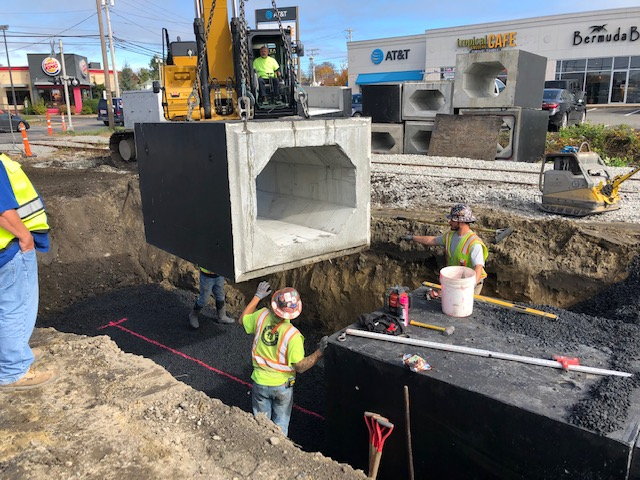
Culvert installation in New Bedford in October 2019

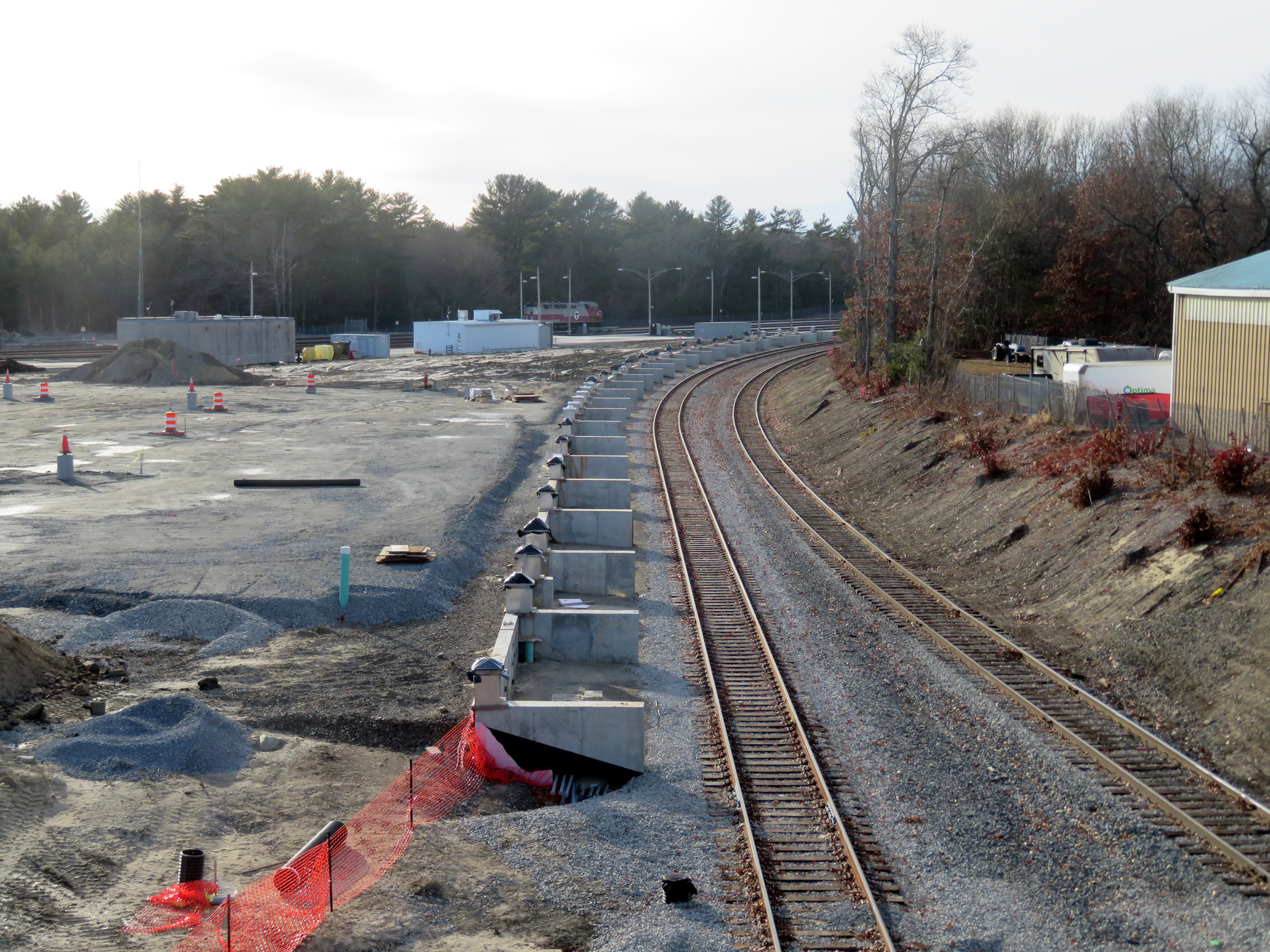
Middleborough station under construction in December 2021

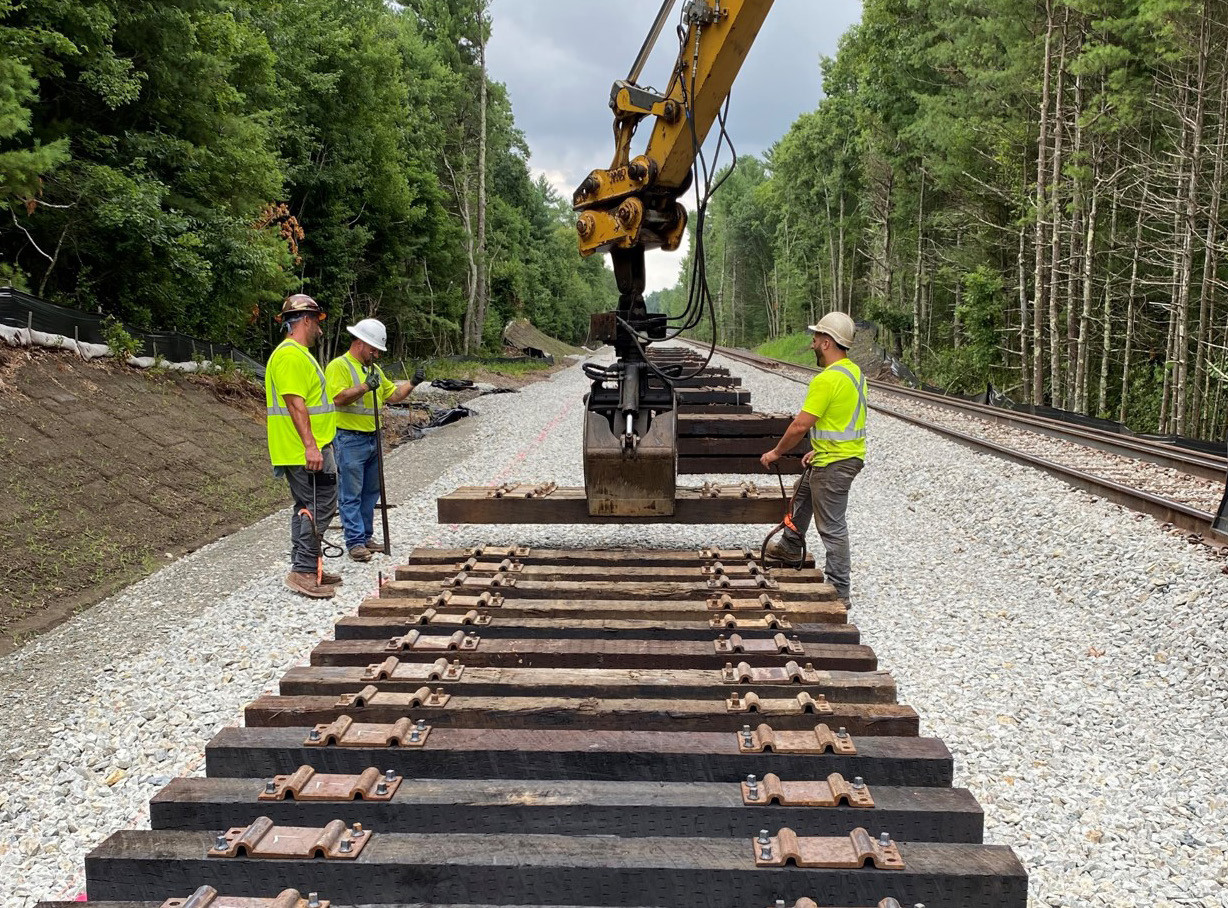
Ties being set for a new track in Berkley in 2022

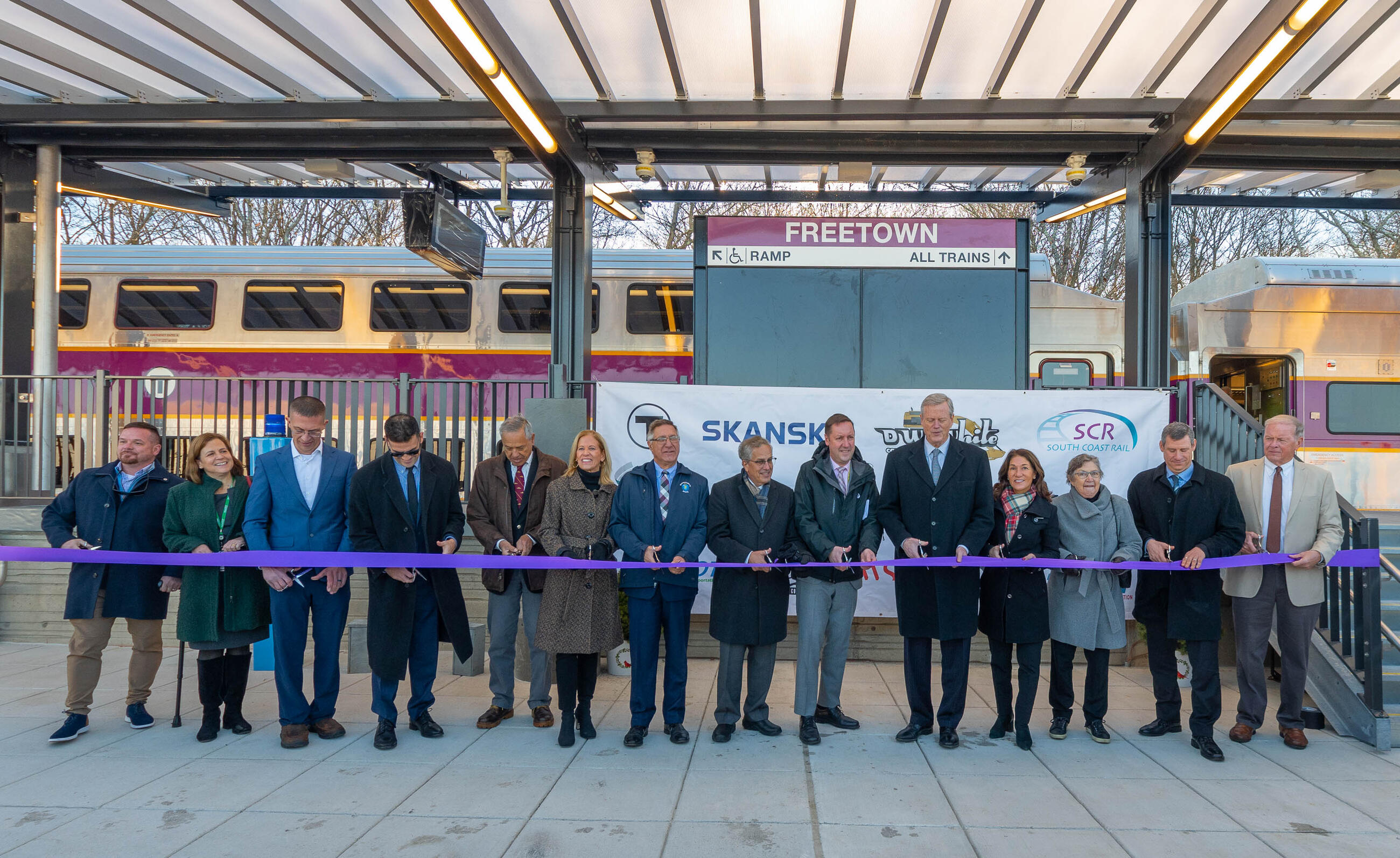
Dignitaries at the ribbon-cutting ceremony at Freetown station in December 2022

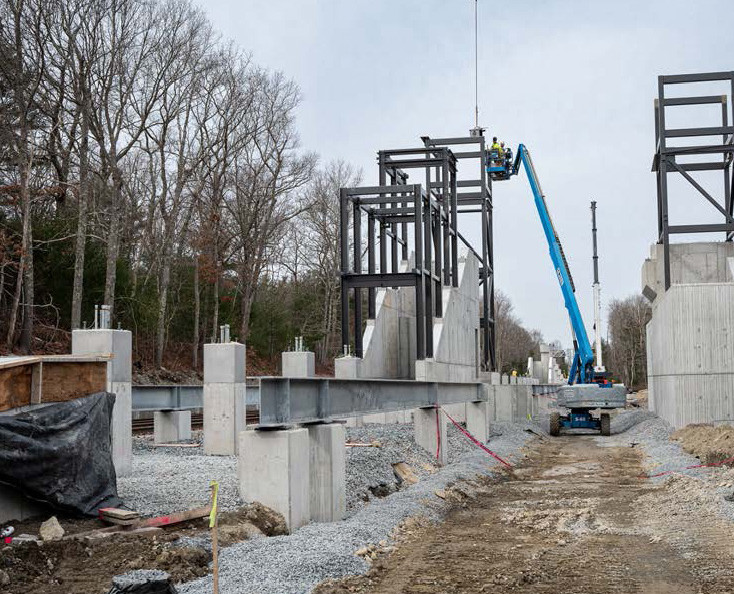
East Taunton station under construction in 2023

== Phase 2 plans ==
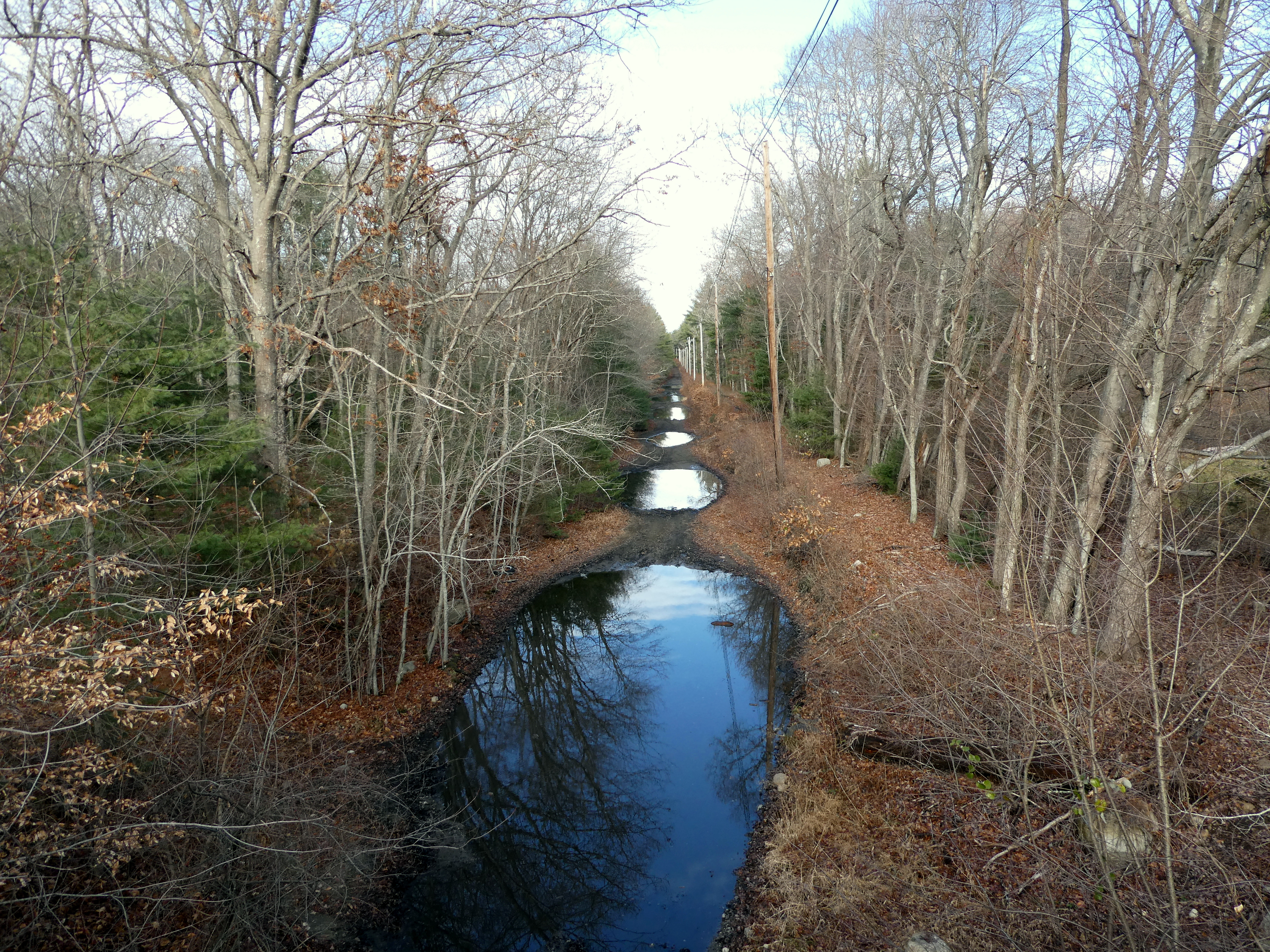
Abandoned railbed along the Phase 2 route in Raynham

The portion of the route between Stoughton and Taunton, proposed for construction in Phase 2, has proved the most controversial part of the project. While the cities of Taunton, Fall River, and New Bedford pushed for the project, the towns of Raynham and Easton objected to the Stoughton route beginning in the 1990s, citing concerns about pollution, traffic, and grade crossing safety. The two towns began legal action opposing the project in 1997; Stoughton joined in 2001. Their legal fight focused on potential impacts to the Hockomock Swamp. In his 2002 approval of the Final Environmental Impact Report, Secretary of Environmental Affairs Robert Durand mandated the construction of a trestle through the swamp to reduce impacts. Later planning included the trestle plan.

In 2007, voters in Raynham elected to seek mitigation for impacts rather than continue litigation. Easton voters made the same choice in 2008. In 2009, Stoughton officials indicated that they would seek for a tunnel to be built through the downtown area — as was done in Hingham on the Greenbush Line — with Stoughton station moved underground. A town committee found that the state was unlikely to fund such a plan. In 2014, Raynham officials expressed interest in lowering tracks under Route 138 to prevent traffic impacts. When plans for the phased approach were announced in 2017, Stoughton, Easton, and Raynham officials continued their previous opposition to the project.

Whether Phase 2 of the project will ever be built is unclear. By mid-2024, MassDOT no longer indicated that it would be built by 2030. No funding for Phase 2 was included in the MBTA's FY 2026–2030 capital investment plan in 2025.
