= Dean Street station (Massachusetts) =

Former railway station in Taunton, Massachusetts

Dean Street
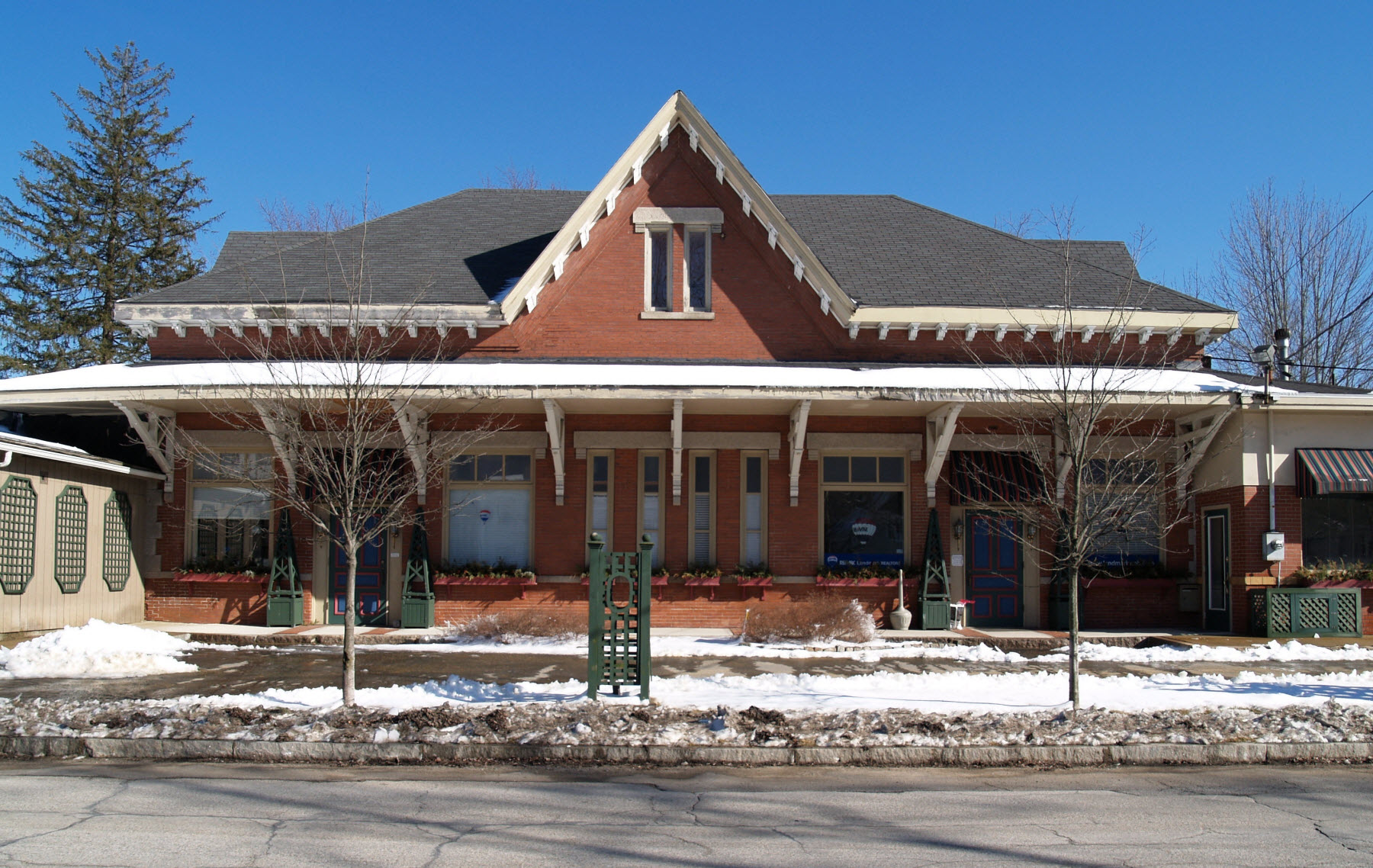
- The former station building in 2008

General information
- Location: Off Dean Street; Taunton, Massachusetts
- Coordinates: 41°54′16″N 71°4′56″W
- Owner: City of Taunton
- Line: Dean Street Industrial Track
- Tracks: 1 (current)

History
- Opened: 1866
- Closed: c. 1897
- Rebuilt: 1876

Former services
Preceding station	New York, New Haven and Hartford Railroad	Following station
Raynham toward Boston	Boston–Fall River via Dighton Line	Weir Junction toward Fall River

Proposed services
Preceding station	MBTA	Following station
East Taunton toward Battleship Cove or New Bedford	South Coast Rail Phase 2	Raynham Place toward South Station
- Old Colony Railroad Station
- U.S. National Register of Historic Places
- Interactive map of Old Colony Railroad Station
- Built: 1876
- Architectural style: Italianate
- MPS: Taunton MRA
- NRHP reference No.: 84002192
- Added to NRHP: July 5, 1984
Location

Dean Street station is a former train station located off Dean Street (US Route 44) in Taunton, Massachusetts. The Italianate structure was built in 1876, replacing a previous station opened in 1866. It served passenger trains until the 1890s. The building was added to the National Register of Historic Places in 1984 as Old Colony Railroad Station.

A new MBTA Commuter Rail station called Taunton station (not to be confused with the defunct Taunton Central station, which was located further west on Oak Street) has been proposed near the Dean Street station site as part of the second phase of the South Coast Rail project.

== History ==
The first Taunton station was constructed in 1866 when the Dighton and Somerset Railroad (owned by the Old Colony & Newport Railway) was opened. Originally to be called Taunton, it was renamed as Dean Street in 1865 (before the station even opened) because of the completion of Taunton Central station across town.

The 1876 building, a distinctive brick Italianate structure, is the only surviving railroad station in the city. It has a main hip roof with modillioned eave and corbelled cornice, and a steeply pitched central gable section. At the track level a second roof is supported by large wooden brackets. The building's corners are articulated by stone quoining. The building was added to the National Register of Historic Places as Old Colony Railroad Station in 1984.

With the opening of the Whittenton Branch in 1882, the Old Colony began consolidating service at Taunton Central, beginning with through services. By 1895, only the Boat Train still served Dean Street. All service to the station ended around 1897, and the line was abandoned from Dean Street to Raynham in 1932.

=== South Coast Rail ===
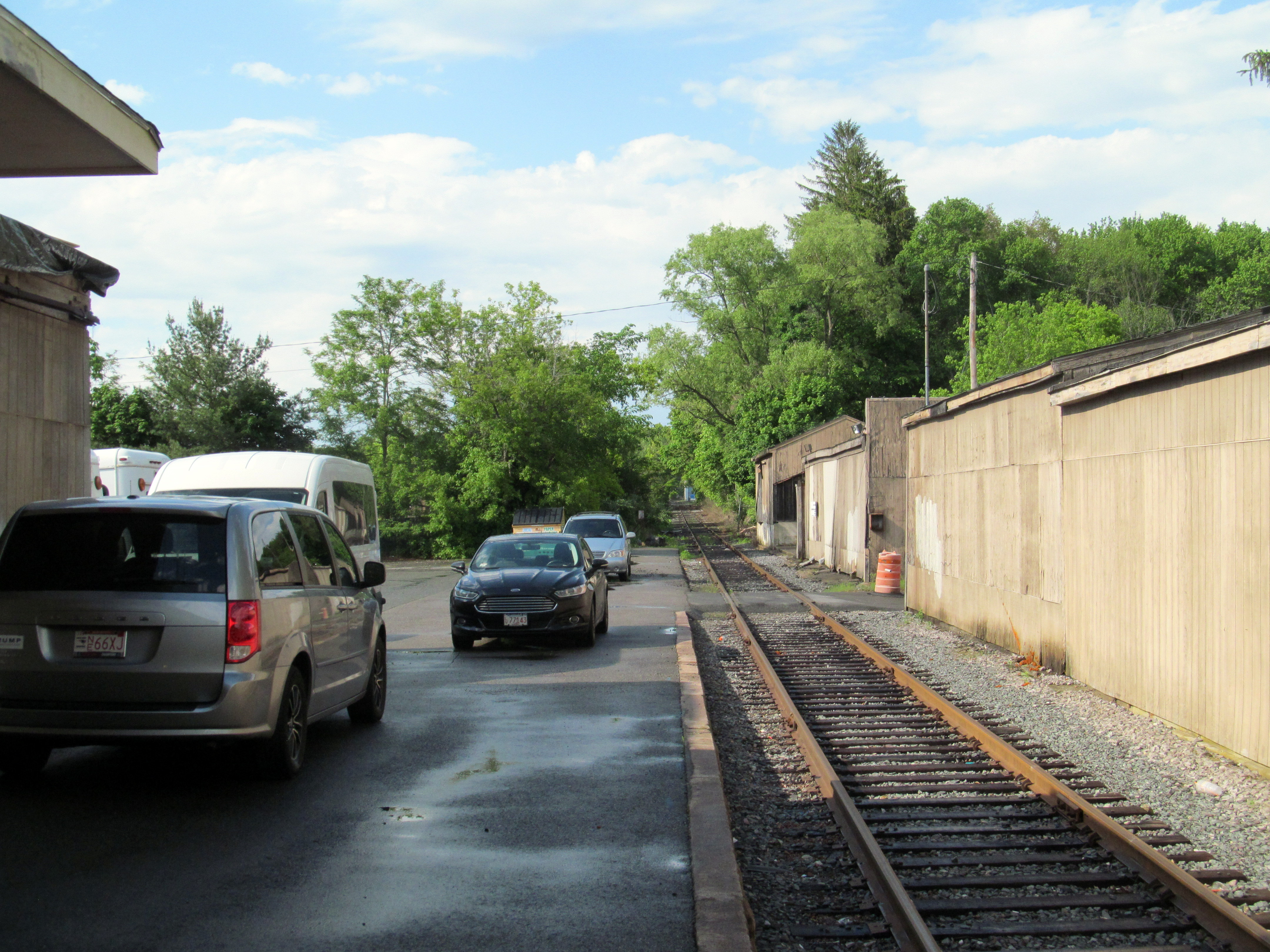
The MBTA platform is proposed to be built north of the historic station building

By 2009, South Coast Rail plans called for new MBTA Commuter Rail service between Boston and Fall River and New Bedford to be routed over the former Dighton and Somerset line via Stoughton. The 2011 Draft Environmental Impact Statement analyzed service via Dean Street or via the Whittenton Branch. The 2013 Final Environmental Impact Statement selected the former route, with a Taunton station to be built near Dean Street. Preliminary designs called for a 800-foot-long high-level platform to be constructed just north of the historic building to serve a single passenger track; a freight passing track would also be added. The passing track was not present in original designs, but was added because the original one-track design would have prevented some wide freight trains from using the line.

In 2017, the project was re-evaluated due to cost issues. The new proposal called for early service via Middleborough by 2022, followed by full service via Stoughton by 2030. The 2017 proposal attracted criticism from local officials across the route, including Taunton officials unhappy that Taunton station would be delayed until 2030. The January 2018 Draft Supplemental Environmental Impact Report considered several service patterns: serving Taunton Depot and/or Taunton stations with a reverse move on some or all trains, or a new East Taunton station near the previously proposed southern site. The latter option was chosen for lower costs and shorter travel times.

== See also ==
- National Register of Historic Places listings in Taunton, Massachusetts
- List of Old Colony Railroad stations
