= Supreme Court Reports (India) =

Official publication of decisions by the Supreme Court of India

Supreme Courts Reports is the official publication of the reportable decisions of the Supreme Court of India. It is being published monthly since the inception of the Supreme Court of India in 1950. It is published under the authority of the Supreme Court of India by the Controller of Publications, Government of India, Delhi.
