= Taunton station (Amtrak) =

Railway station in Taunton, Massachusetts

Coordinates: 41.901063°N 71.100968°W

Taunton, MA
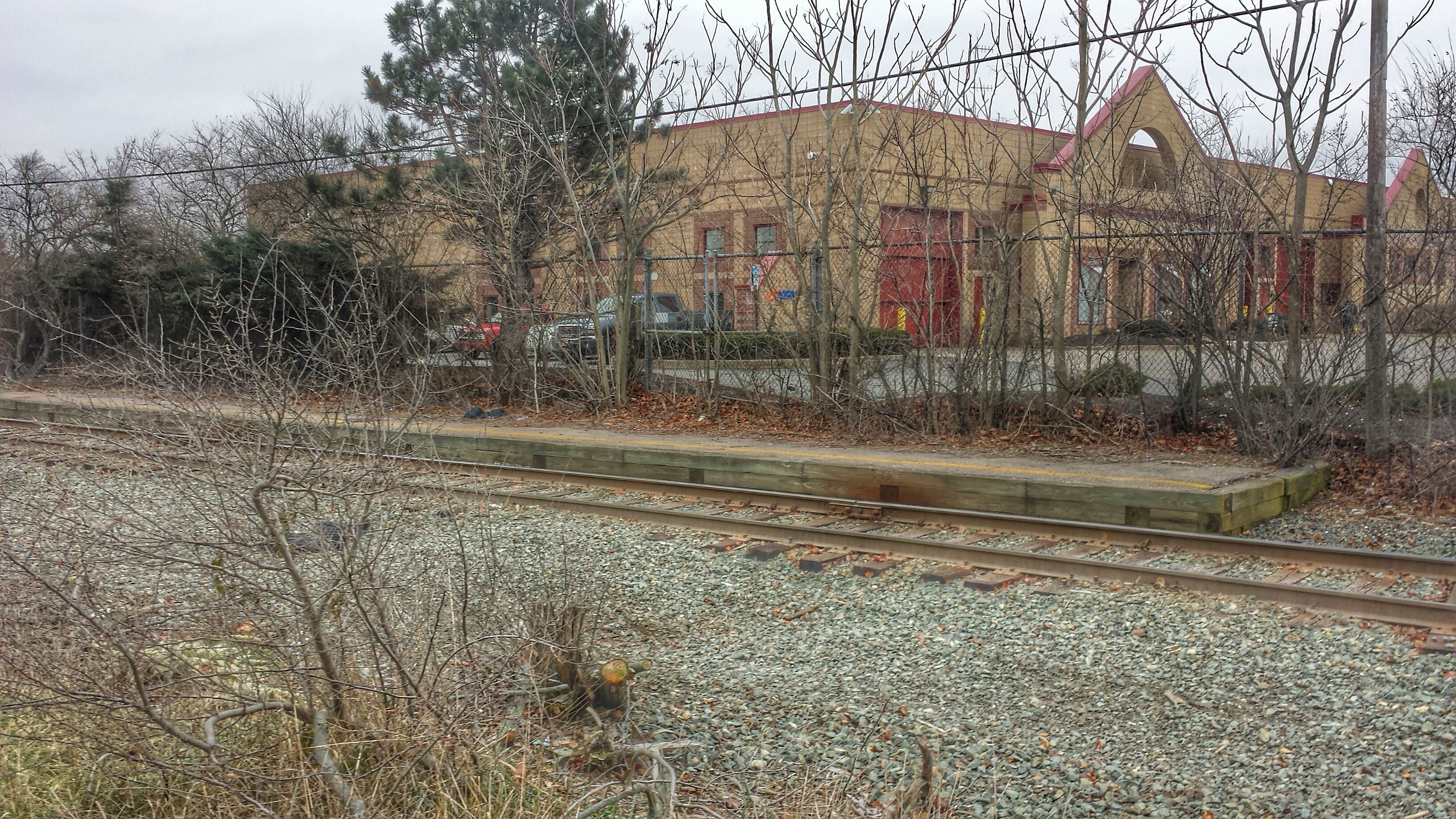
- The 1986-built platform photographed in December 2014

General information
- Location: 2-10 Oak Street, Taunton, Massachusetts
- Line: Middleboro Subdivision
- Platforms: 1 side platform
- Tracks: 1

History
- Opened: August 1836 (New Bedford & Taunton); 1986 (Amtrak)
- Closed: 1958 (New Haven); 1996 (Amtrak)
- Former names: Taunton Central (until 1964)

Former services
Preceding station	Amtrak	Following station
Providence toward New York	Cape Codder 1986–1996	Wareham toward Hyannis
Preceding station	Cape Cod and Hyannis Railroad	Following station
Attleboro Terminus	Attleboro Branch (1988)	Wareham toward Hyannis or Falmouth
Preceding station	New York, New Haven and Hartford Railroad	Following station
Attleboro toward New York	Cape Codder	Wareham toward Hyannis or Woods Hole
Location

Taunton station was a passenger rail station located south of Oak Street in downtown Taunton, Massachusetts. As Taunton Central station, it served local and Boston-focused routes from 1836 to 1964. A later station at the same site served Amtrak's Cape Codder from 1986 to 1996, and Cape Cod and Hyannis Railroad commuter trains in 1988.

== History ==
=== Taunton Central station ===
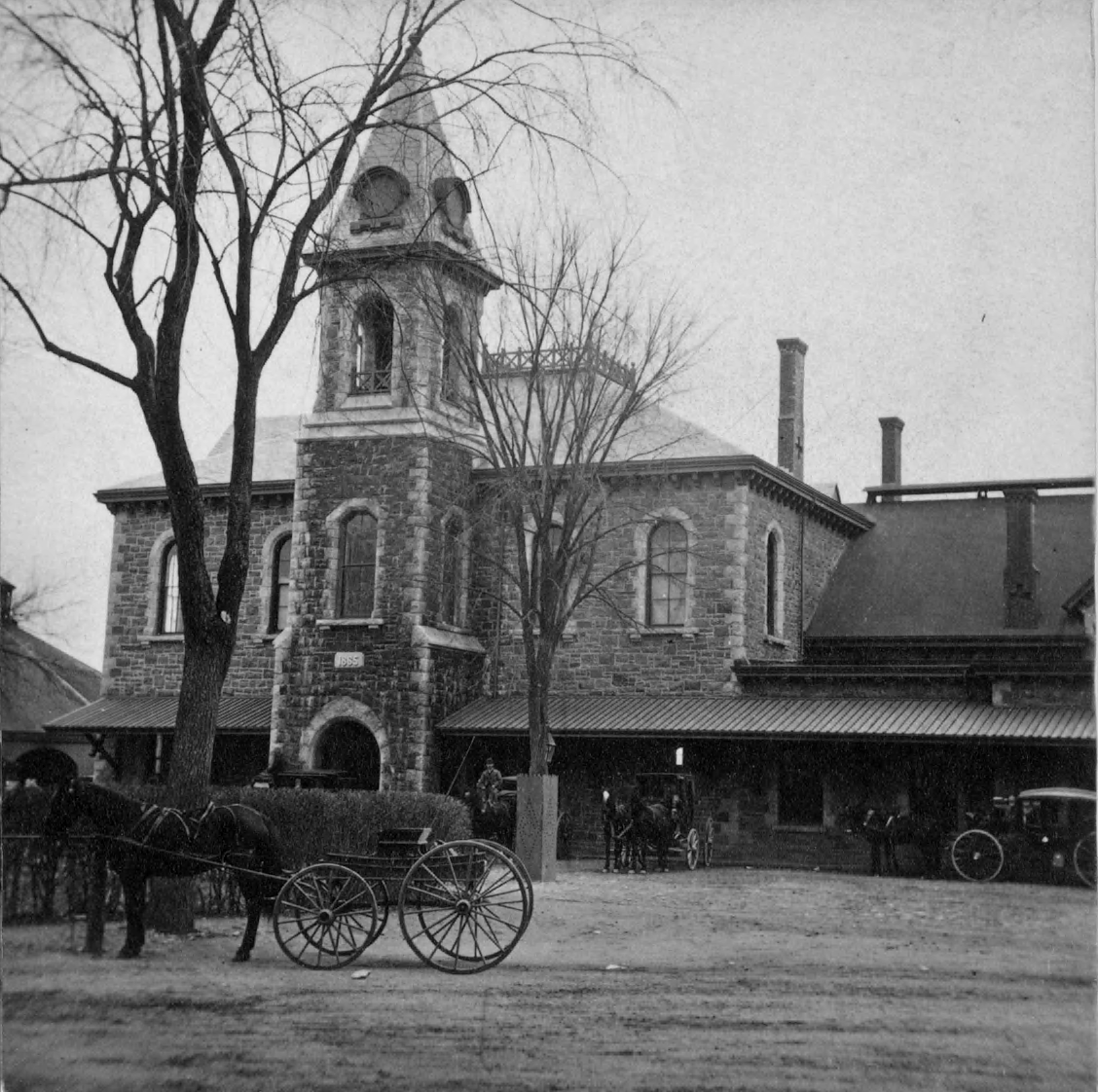
Taunton Central station in the late 1800s

The New Bedford and Taunton Railroad opened from Mansfield to Taunton in August 1836 - one of the first branch lines in the state. Its Taunton Central station was located between Oak Street and Wales Street, surrounded by the Taunton Locomotive Manufacturing Company and Mason Machine Works.

The line passed to the Old Colony Railroad in 1879 and the New Haven Railroad in 1893. The New Haven operated passenger service through Taunton, including Boston - Fall River and Boston - New Bedford routes, in addition to the seasonal New York - Cape Cod Cape Codder service. The railroad was obligated to eliminate grade crossings near the station by a 1913 court order, but this was vacated in 1926.

Year-round NH passenger service to Taunton ended in 1958. Taunton briefly saw service again, during the summers of 1960 to 1964, when the Day Cape Codder and Neptune returned.

=== Amtrak and CC&HRR ===
A new station nearby was built for Amtrak's Cape Codder service from 1986 to 1996. Located off Oak Street next to the GATRA Bloom Bus Terminal (where a ticket counter was located), the station consisted of a single bare asphalt platform serving the single track.

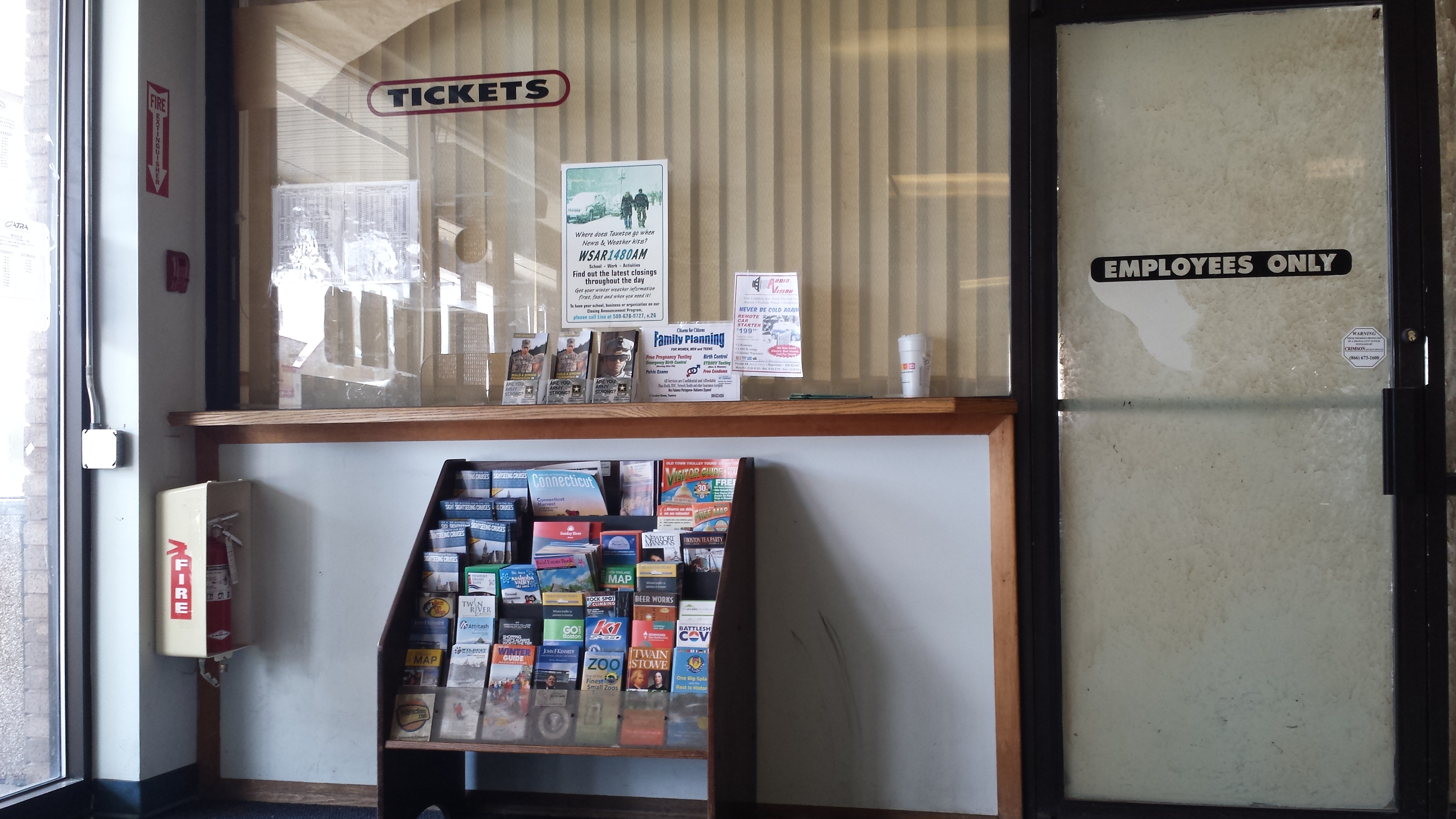
The old Cape Codder ticket window, shortly before renovations at the station.

Cape Cod & Hyannis Railroad commuter trains stopped at the station on Attleboro-Cape Cod runs in 1988.

As of 2014 the 1980s-built platform is still extant, though partially covered by vegetation, and the old ticket window could be seen in the Bloom Bus Station that served as the terminal, until a renovation in 2015.

=== South Coast Rail ===
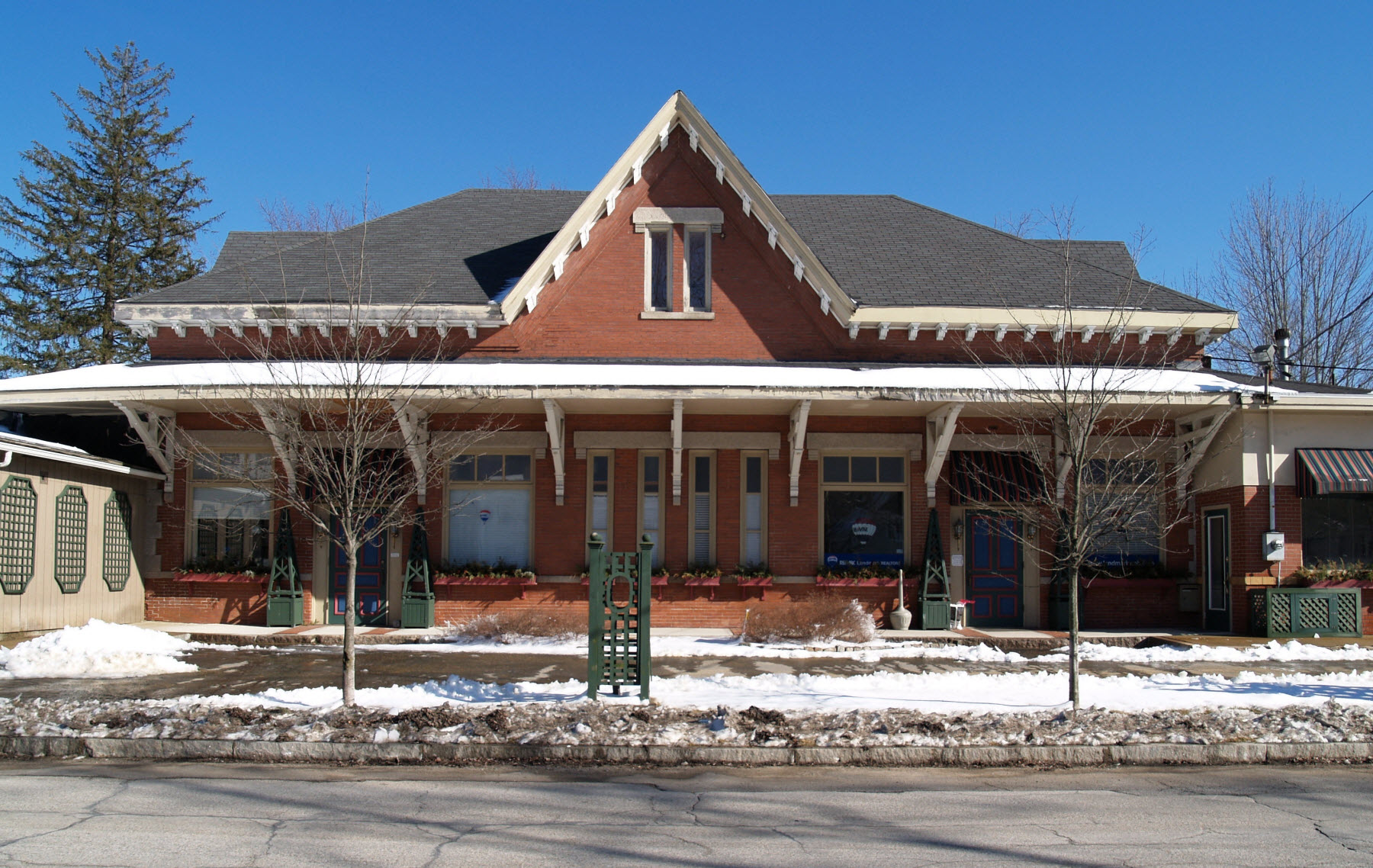
Under current plans, Taunton will have an MBTA Commuter Rail station at the Dean Street site (pictured) instead of the Oak Street site.

At several times during the South Coast Rail planning process, the site was under consideration as a station for MBTA Commuter Rail service to Boston. In September 1995, the MBTA filed an environmental notification form for construction of the project, with a routing following the Northeast Corridor to just north of Attleboro and a new bypass connecting to the branch line to Taunton. The station would have been upgraded to a full-length high-level platform to meet Americans with Disabilities Act requirements. However, further reports suggested a route through Stoughton which would not stop at the station location, and the project was eventually cancelled in 2003.

When planning was restarted in 2005, alternatives through Attleboro and Stoughton were considered. The Stoughton alternate chosen in 2009 included two possible routing options, one following the former Whittenton Branch which would have a station at the Oak Street location. This would have provided convenient transfers to GATRA bus services, but resulted in longer travel times as the Whittenton Branch includes several major curves.

The Final Environmental Impact Statement, released in 2013, selected a route further east with Dean Street station as a downtown stop instead. The FEIS included the possibility of using the Whittenton Branch, but a station would have been built at Dana Street several blocks to the north of the Oak Street location, where the straighter track geometry would be more favorable for the construction of full-length high-level platforms.
