= South Coast (Massachusetts) =

Region of southeastern Massachusetts

Coordinates: 41.63°N 70.92°W

- Region of Massachusetts
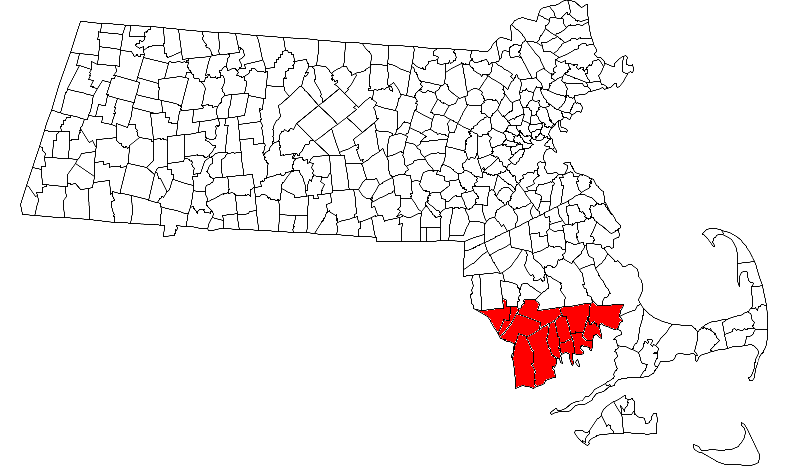
- The South Coast Region of Massachusetts
- Interactive map of South Coast
- Country: United States
- State: Massachusetts
- Cities and towns: Acushnet, Berkley, Dartmouth, Fairhaven, Fall River, Freetown, Lakeville, Little Compton, Marion, Mattapoisett, New Bedford, Rochester, Somerset, Swansea, Tiverton, Wareham and Westport

Population
  - Total: 306,588
- Largest city (population): New Bedford, (100,941)
- Largest city (land area): Dartmouth, 97.5 sq mi (252.6 km2)

The South Coast of Massachusetts (sometimes stylized SouthCoast) is the region of southeastern Massachusetts consisting of the southern part of Bristol and Plymouth counties, bordering Buzzards Bay, and includes the cities of Fall River and New Bedford. The Rhode Island towns of Tiverton and Little Compton, located in Newport County, are sometimes included within the South Coast designation due to regional similarities and economic ties with adjacent communities.

The term is recent, dating to the 1990s, and sometimes confused with the South Shore (a region southeast of Boston that includes eastern Norfolk and Plymouth counties, and does not overlap with the South Coast).

== Terminology ==
The "South Coast" label was born as a public relations effort to counteract the perceived stigma of former terms like "Greater Fall River," "Greater New Bedford," or "New Bedford-Fall River," which conjured images, in many Massachusetts residents' minds, of depressed mill towns with run-down buildings and high unemployment. Local boosters, including The Standard-Times newspaper, began using the term in the mid-1990s in an effort to attract business to an area with "the Cape's climate," "better infrastructure" and "relatively low land prices," according to Standard-Times publisher William Kennedy.

== Geography ==
=== Communities ===
There are 15 Massachusetts municipalities that are almost always included in the South Coast (total population: 306,588). Two Rhode Island towns may also be included.

- Acushnet
- Berkley
- Dartmouth
- Fairhaven
- Fall River
- Freetown
- Lakeville
- Little Compton, RI
- Marion
- Mattapoisett
- New Bedford
- Rochester
- Somerset
- Swansea
- Tiverton, RI
- Wareham
- Westport

The Massachusetts Office of Coastal Zone Management also includes the towns of Dighton, Seekonk and Rehoboth within its South Coast regional service area; however, these communities are more often associated with the Providence Metro Area or Greater Taunton Area than the South Coast. The entirety of the South Coast resides within the Southeastern Regional Planning and Economic Development District.

By its most literal definition, the South Coast only includes cities and towns in southern Massachusetts that may not be considered parts of the Providence Metropolitan Area, the South Shore or Cape Cod; it encompasses the geographic area of Massachusetts that borders Buzzards Bay (excluding the Elizabeth Islands, Bourne and Falmouth), Mount Hope Bay and the Sakonnet River. Little Compton and Tiverton Rhode Island are often considered parts of the South Coast due to proximity and shared regional heritage; it has been argued that Little Compton and Tiverton share more in common with the regional identities of Westport and Dartmouth (and to an extent Fall River) than the rest of Newport County. East Taunton is sometimes considered the northernmost extent of the South Coast region; however, it does not include the entire city of Taunton.

The South Coast region is typically associated with its distinct industrial heritage pertaining to textile, whaling, and fishing industries; the South Coast also has the largest Portuguese American population in the United States.

=== Farm Coast ===
In recent years, an unofficial sub-region of the South Coast known as the Farm Coast has been used to describe the cluster of rural towns that are situated on the northern coast of Buzzards Bay; these towns are considered to be the last coastal farming communities left in Southern New England and share a common regional identity and aesthetic. The Farm Coast consists of the towns of Tiverton, Little Compton, Westport and Dartmouth.

== Education ==
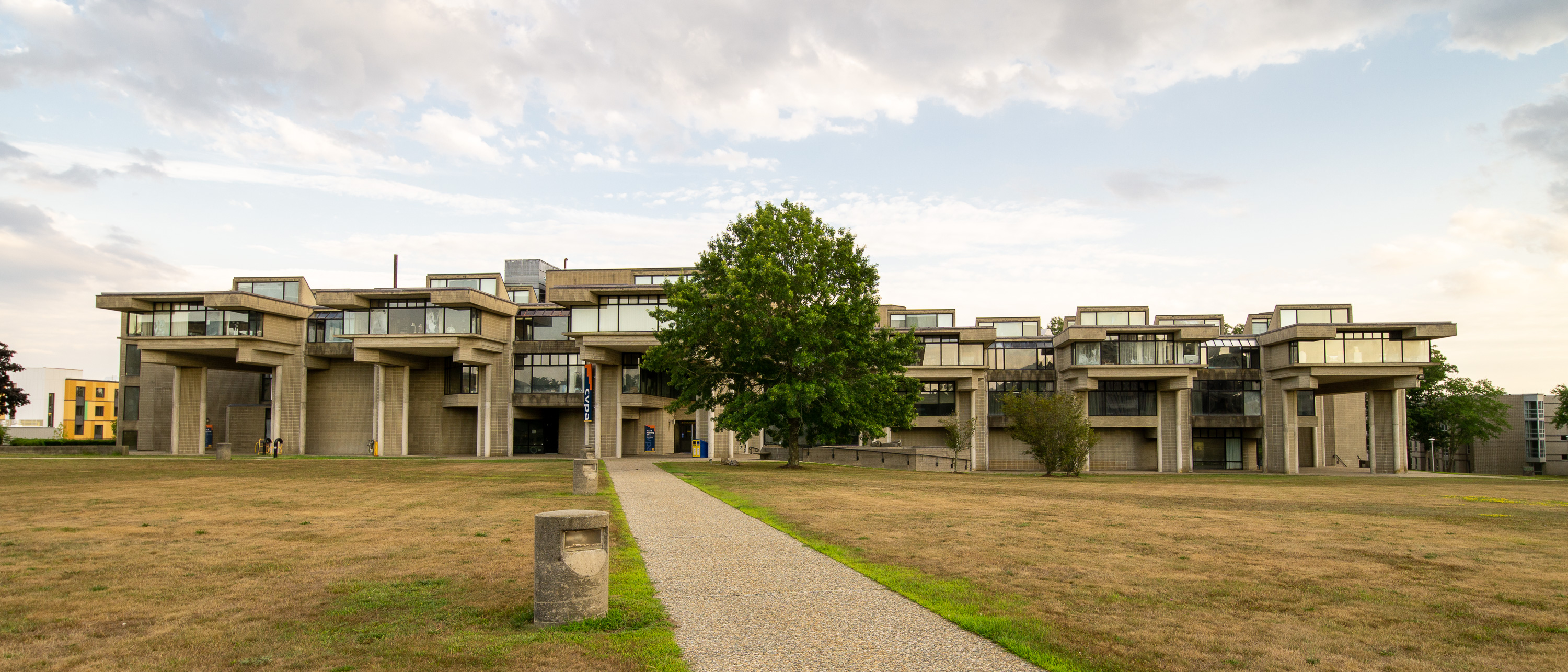
UMass Dartmouth is known for its brutalist campus structures

Institutions of higher learning located in South Coast communities include:

- University of Massachusetts Dartmouth- Dartmouth
- Charlton College of Business- Dartmouth
- University of Massachusetts School of Law- Dartmouth
- Bristol Community College- Fall River and New Bedford

== Transportation ==
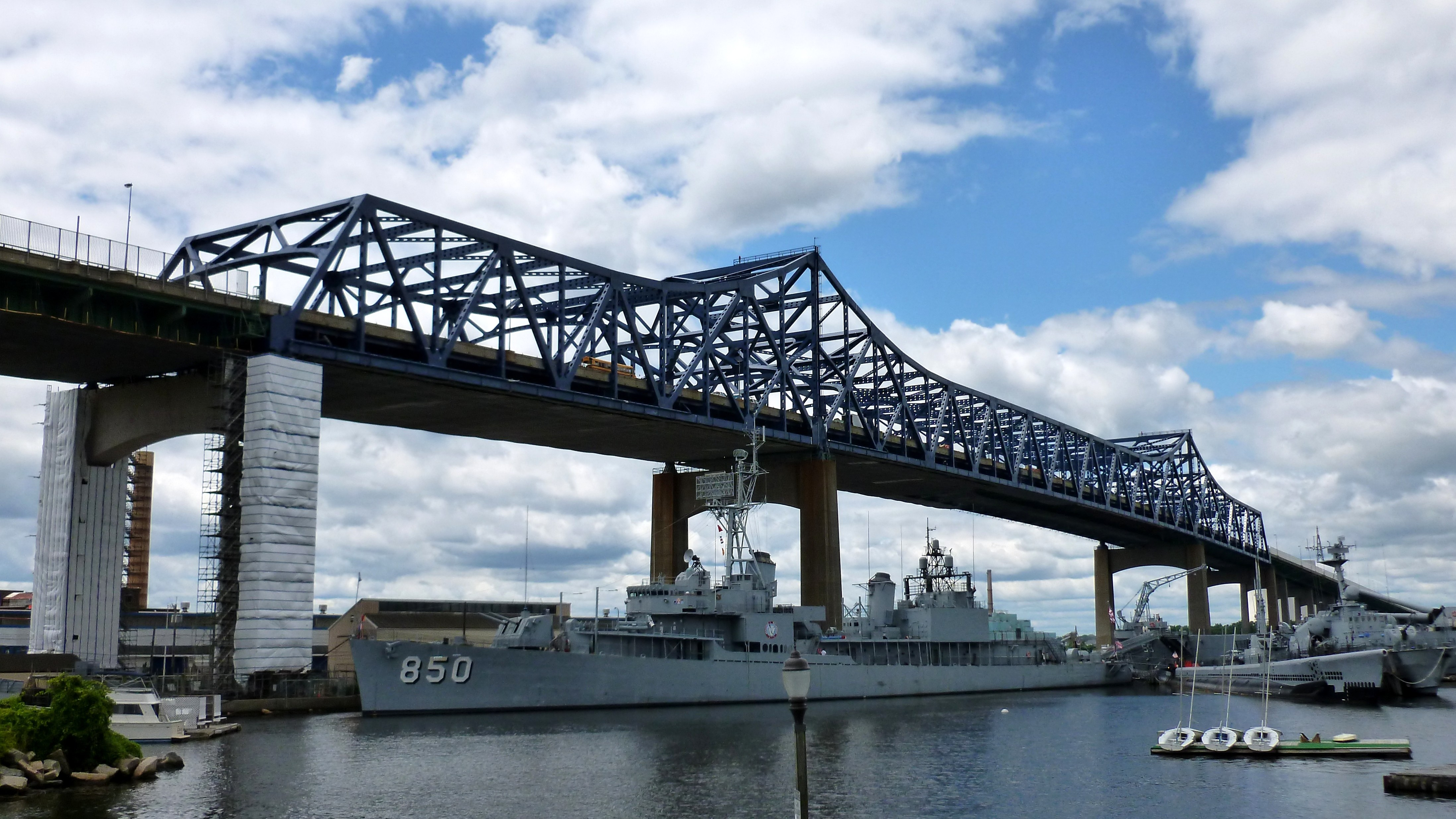
The Braga Bridge carries Interstate 195 over the Taunton River between Somerset and Fall River

The major highways through the area are Interstate 195 (from Providence to Wareham, Massachusetts) and U.S. Route 6, which is the older route connecting Providence to Cape Cod. Highway access to Boston is provided by Route 24 and Route 79, both of which end in Fall River, and Route 140 which connects New Bedford to Route 24 in Taunton. On February 27, 2023, MassDOT initiated a project to demolish the southern end of Route 79 in order to facilitate the restoration of Fall River's waterfront. Public bus service is provided by the Southeastern Regional Transit Authority, the Greater Attleboro Taunton Regional Transit Authority and the Rhode Island Public Transit Authority.

Passenger rail service to Boston's South Station is provided by the MBTA Commuter Rail's Fall River/New Bedford Line with stations including Fall River Depot, New Bedford, Church Street, Freetown, and East Taunton. Other stations on the line include Middleborough, Bridgewater, Montello, Brockton, Campello, Holbrook/Randolph, Braintree, Quincy Center, and JFK/UMass.

The city of New Bedford offers passenger ferry services to Martha's Vineyard and Cuttyhunk Island.

== Sites of interest ==
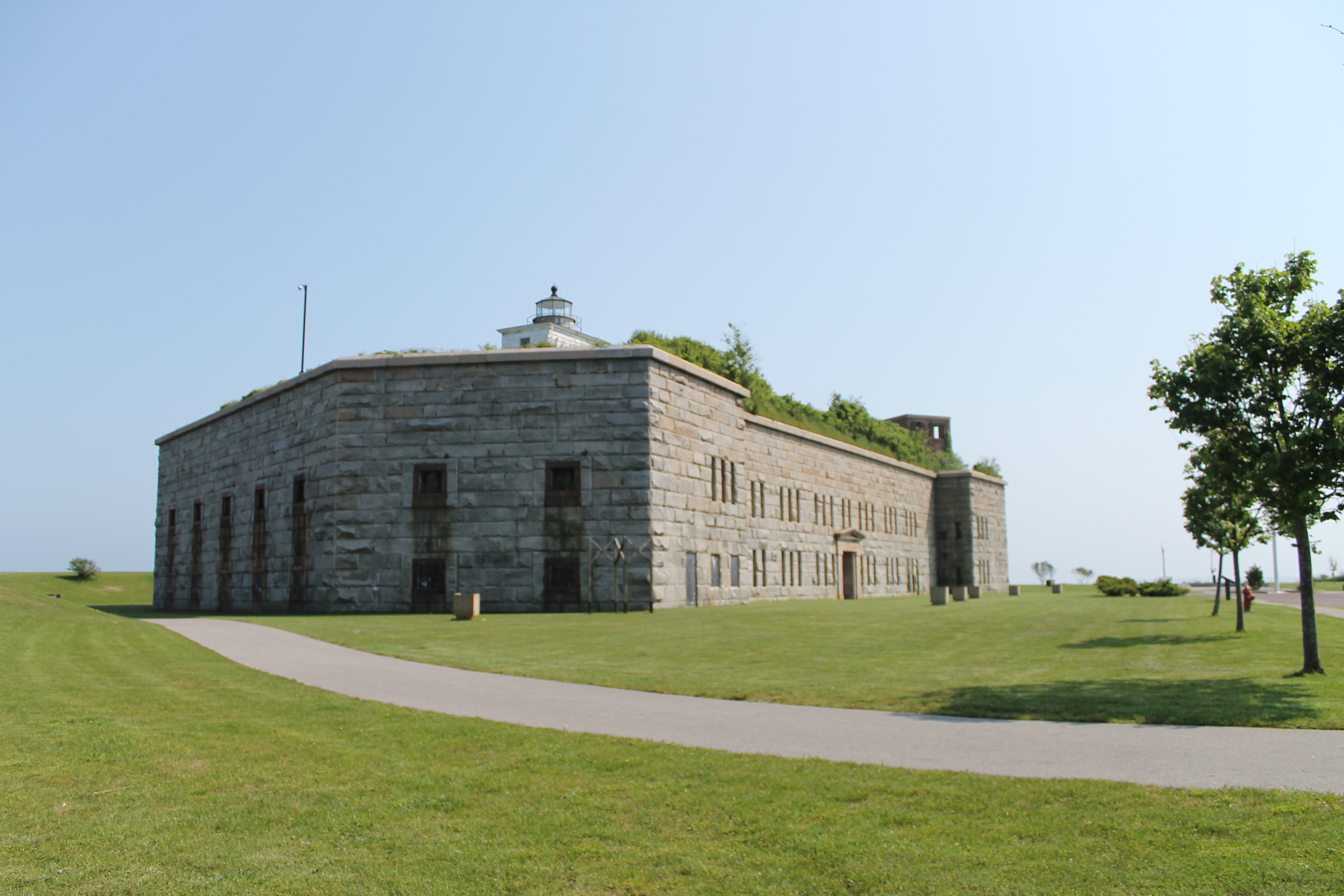
Fort Rodman is a part of the Fort Taber District in New Bedford

- Battleship Cove, the world's largest collection of World War II naval vessels
- Lizzie Borden Bed and Breakfast Museum, location of the 1892 unsolved double murder of Lizzie Borden's father and stepmother Andrew and Abby Borden
- New Bedford Whaling National Historical Park, includes the New Bedford Whaling Museum
- Fort Taber, historic American Civil War-era military fort
- Horseneck Beach, public recreation area comprising southern Westport
- Acushnet Cedar Swamp, designated as a National Natural Landmark by the National Park Service
- Borden Flats Lighthouse, one of several historic lighthouses located in the South Coast

== Media ==
The term "South Coast" reportedly began with weather forecasts by Todd Gross on WHDH-TV in Boston. New Bedford's local daily newspaper, The Standard-Times, picked it up in the late 1990s, and other media have followed suit, albeit not without some protest by longtime area residents who protested the manufactured name.

Other newspapers serving the area include The Herald News of Fall River; "The Standard Times" with an online entertainment subsidiary "southcoasttoday.com" of New Bedford; the Sakonnet Times; the Taunton Daily Gazette; The Providence Journal; and, for regional coverage, The Boston Globe and Boston Herald. Much of the broadcast media in the area is local to metropolitan Providence and Boston.

Radio stations include ethnic WHTB/1400-Fall River, news/talk/sports WBSM/1420-New Bedford, news/talk/sports WSAR/1480-Fall River, religious ethnic WFHL/88.1-New Bedford, K-Love WTKL/91.1-North Dartmouth, Portuguese-language WJFD-FM/97.3-New Bedford, country WCTK/98.1-New Bedford, top 40/dance WFHN/107.1-Fairhaven, and public radio news WNPN/89.3-Newport, RI.

Television stations include ABC affiliate WLNE-TV/49 (PSIP 6)-New Bedford and CW affiliate WLWC/22 (PSIP 28)-New Bedford.

== See also ==
- MetroWest, another region with a recent name
