= East Taunton station =

Railway station in Taunton, Massachusetts, US

East Taunton
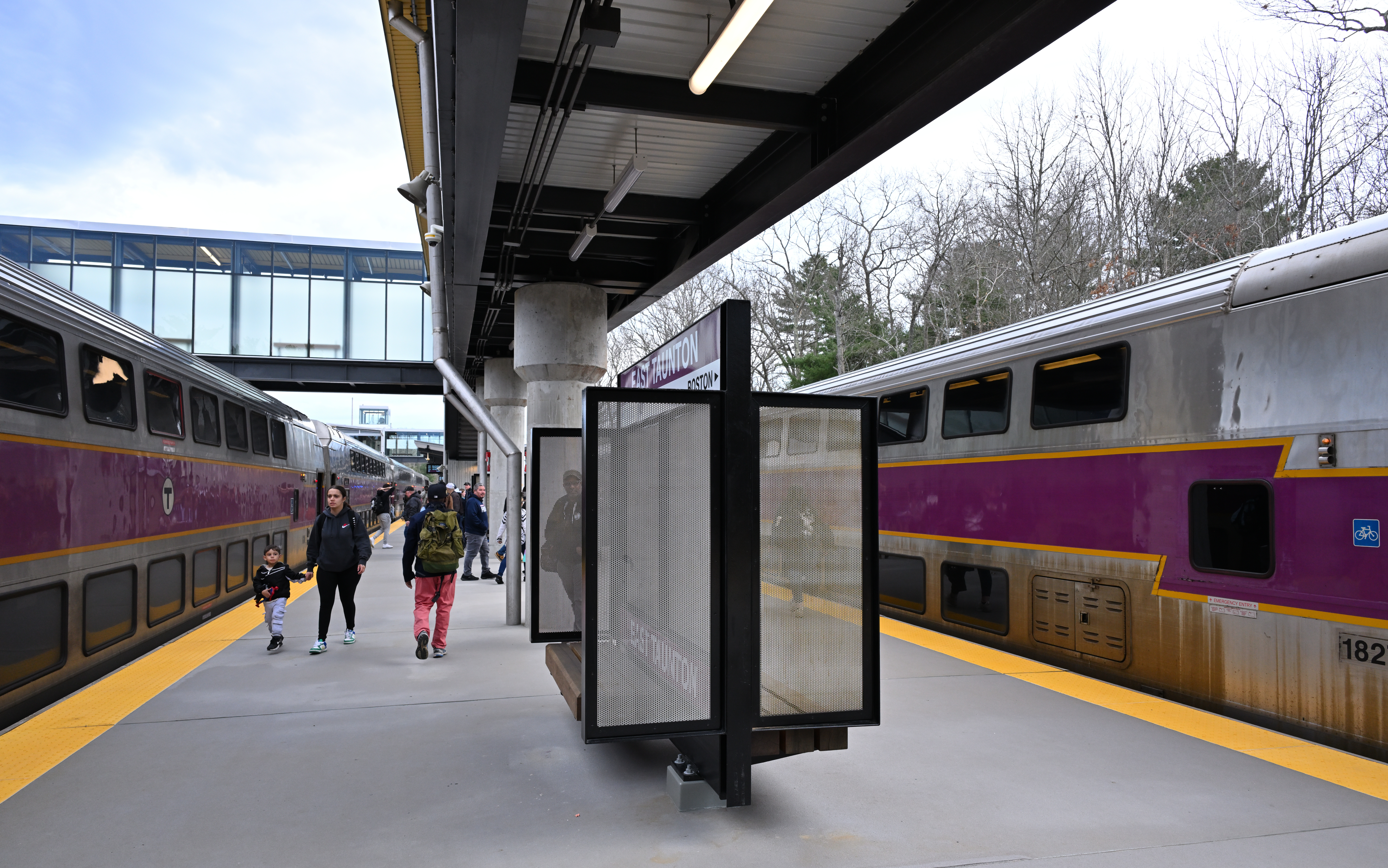
- Two trains at East Taunton station in March 2025

General information
- Location: 1141 County Street; Taunton, Massachusetts
- Coordinates: 41.86799°N 71.06148°W
- Line: New Bedford Main Line
- Platforms: 1 island platform
- Tracks: 3 (2 station tracks, 1 freight bypass)
- Connections: GATRA: 8

Construction
- Parking: 363 spaces
- Cycle facilities: Racks
- Accessible: Yes

Other information
- Fare zone: 8

History
- Opened: March 24, 2025

Passengers
- 2030: 420 daily boardings (projected)

Services
Preceding station	MBTA	Following station
Middleborough toward South Station	Fall River/New Bedford Line	Freetown toward Fall River
Middleborough toward South Station	Fall River/New Bedford Line	Church Street toward New Bedford
Proposed services
Preceding station	MBTA	Following station
Taunton toward South Station	South Coast Rail Phase 2	Freetown toward Battleship Cove
Taunton toward South Station	South Coast Rail Phase 2	Church Street toward New Bedford
Location

East Taunton station is an MBTA Commuter Rail station in East Taunton, Massachusetts adjacent to the interchange between the Route 24 expressway and County Street (Route 140). The station is served by the Fall River/New Bedford Line. It opened on March 24, 2025, as part of the first phase of the South Coast Rail project. East Taunton is a transfer point between shuttle trains and through trains.

A former East Taunton station, located to the east on a different line, was served by the New York, New Haven and Hartford Railroad and several predecessors until 1927. In 2009, South Coast Rail planning identified Taunton Depot, just north of Middleborough Junction (Cotley Junction), as a preferred station site. A 2017 re-evaluation of the project recommended an interim route through Middleborough, with East Taunton station located just south of the junction. A construction contract was issued in 2020; the station was completed in October 2024.

== Station design ==
The station is located in the southeast portion of Taunton along the New Bedford Secondary, slightly northwest of the Route 24 expressway. The station driveway (an extension of the existing Industrial Drive) is reached from County Street (Route 140) just north of the Route 24/Route 140 interchange. East Taunton station has a single full-length high-level island platform, 800 feet (240 m) long and 26.5 feet (8.1 m) wide. It serves the two passenger tracks, with a freight bypass track to the west. Two footbridges – one with stairs, the other with ramps – connect the platform to the 363-space parking lot, which includes a turnout for Greater Attleboro Taunton Regional Transit Authority (GATRA) buses.

== History ==
=== Former service ===
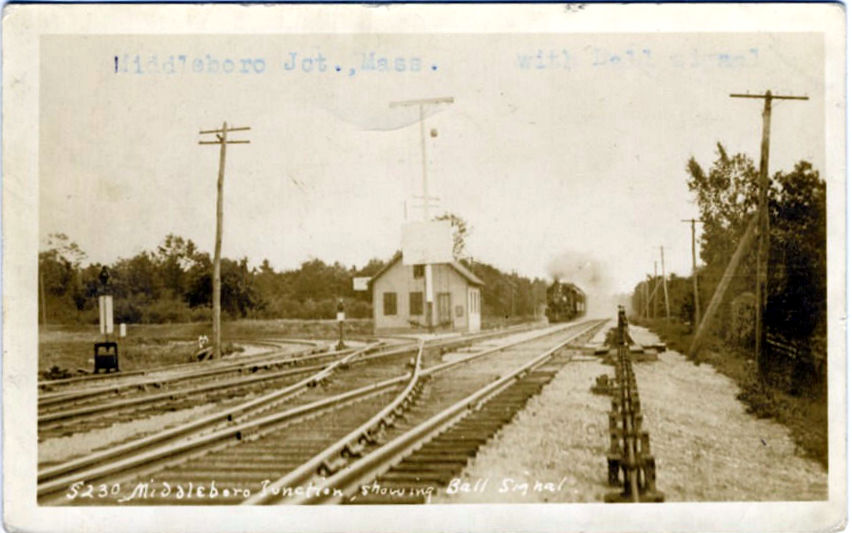
Cotley Junction in the early 20th century

The Taunton Branch Railroad was extended to New Bedford as the New Bedford and Taunton Railroad in 1840. The Middleborough and Taunton Railroad opened from Middleborough to Cotley Junction (Middleborough Junction) – south of Taunton on the New Bedford and Taunton Railroad – in 1856. No station was located at the junction, which was in a relatively unpopulated area. East Taunton station on the Middleborough and Taunton was located 2 miles (3.2 km) east at Old Colony Avenue in East Taunton village. The Middleborough and Taunton was acquired by the Old Colony Railroad in 1874, followed by the former New Bedford and Taunton (after several ownership and name changes) in 1879. The Old Colony was in turn acquired by the New York, New Haven and Hartford Railroad in 1893.

Local passenger service between Middleborough and Taunton was operated as Providence–Plymouth or Taunton–Plymouth trains; it was discontinued in 1927 when service on the Darby Branch ended. East Taunton station was closed; the line was used by New York–Cape Cod trains until 1964, and commuter rail service to New Bedford via Taunton lasted until 1958. Freight service continued on the Middleboro Secondary and New Bedford Subdivision; the state purchased the former line from Conrail in December 1982.

=== South Coast Rail ===
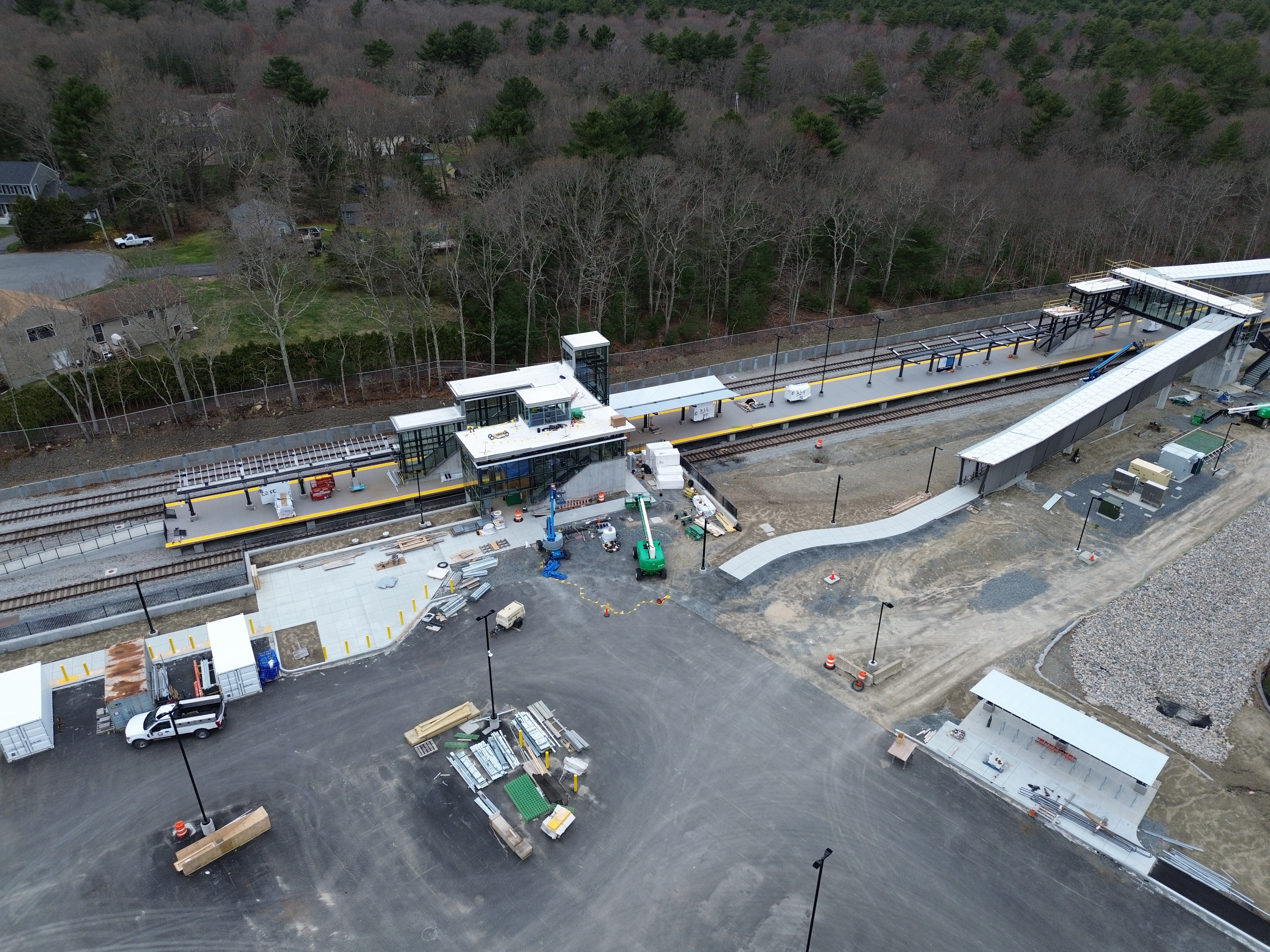
Aerial view of construction in April 2024

In September 2008, MassDOT released 18 potential station sites for the South Coast Rail project, including two potential East Taunton sites: one just west of Route 24 if trains were routed through Middleborough, and one to the north off Route 140 if trains were routed through Stoughton or Attleboro. The 2009 selection of the Stoughton route included Taunton Depot at the northern site. It was to have an island platform flanked by two passenger tracks, with a freight passing track on the western side. Potential transit-oriented development included new multi-family housing to the north, and eventual redevelopment of a nearby shopping center. Station plans released as part of the Final Environmental Impact Report in 2013 were nearly identical to those from 2009. On June 11, 2010, the state took ownership of the New Bedford Subdivision and several other CSX lines as part of a sale agreement.

In 2017, the project was re-evaluated due to cost issues. The new proposal called for early service via Middleborough by 2022, followed by full service via Stoughton by 2030. The 2017 proposal attracted criticism from local officials across the route, including Taunton officials unhappy that the downtown Taunton station would be delayed until 2030. The January 2018 Draft Supplemental Environmental Impact Report considered several service patterns: serving Taunton Depot and/or Taunton stations with a reverse move on some or all trains, or a new East Taunton station near the previously proposed southern site. The latter option was chosen for lower costs and shorter travel times.

Two sites just south of Cotley Junction, and one site at Old Colony Avenue (the former East Taunton station location) were considered. The previously considered southern site (a former sports complex on Industrial Drive at 1141 County Street) was chosen. The site is adjacent to the interchange between the Route 24 expressway and County Street (Route 140). As with the former Taunton Depot plans, the station design had a single island platform with two passenger tracks and a freight passing track.

The sports complex was demolished in 2020 to make room for the station and its parking lot. The MBTA awarded a $403.5 million contract for the Middleborough Secondary and New Bedford Secondary portions of the project, including East Taunton station, on August 24, 2020. Construction was expected to begin later in 2020 and take 37 months, with a late 2023 opening. The contract was 18% complete by November 2021, with station construction underway, and 53% complete by August 2022. In December 2022, the city council approved a zoning change allowing transit oriented development near the station.

Opening was delayed to mid-2024 in September 2023; at that point, the station was 69% complete and expected to be finished in January 2024. In June 2024, planned opening was further delayed to May 2025. East Taunton station was 75% complete at that point and expected to be completed in August 2024. The complex construction of East Taunton station, including the elevators, was one of the reasons given for the delay. The station was ultimately completed in October 2024. Service began on March 24, 2025. On weekdays, some trains operate as shuttle trains between East Taunton and the southern terminals, with transfers to and from through trains at East Taunton. When the station opened, GATRA began limited temporary bus service to the station to gauge demand. Regular GATRA service to the station began on June 2, 2025.
