= New Bedford Main Line =

Railway line in Massachusetts

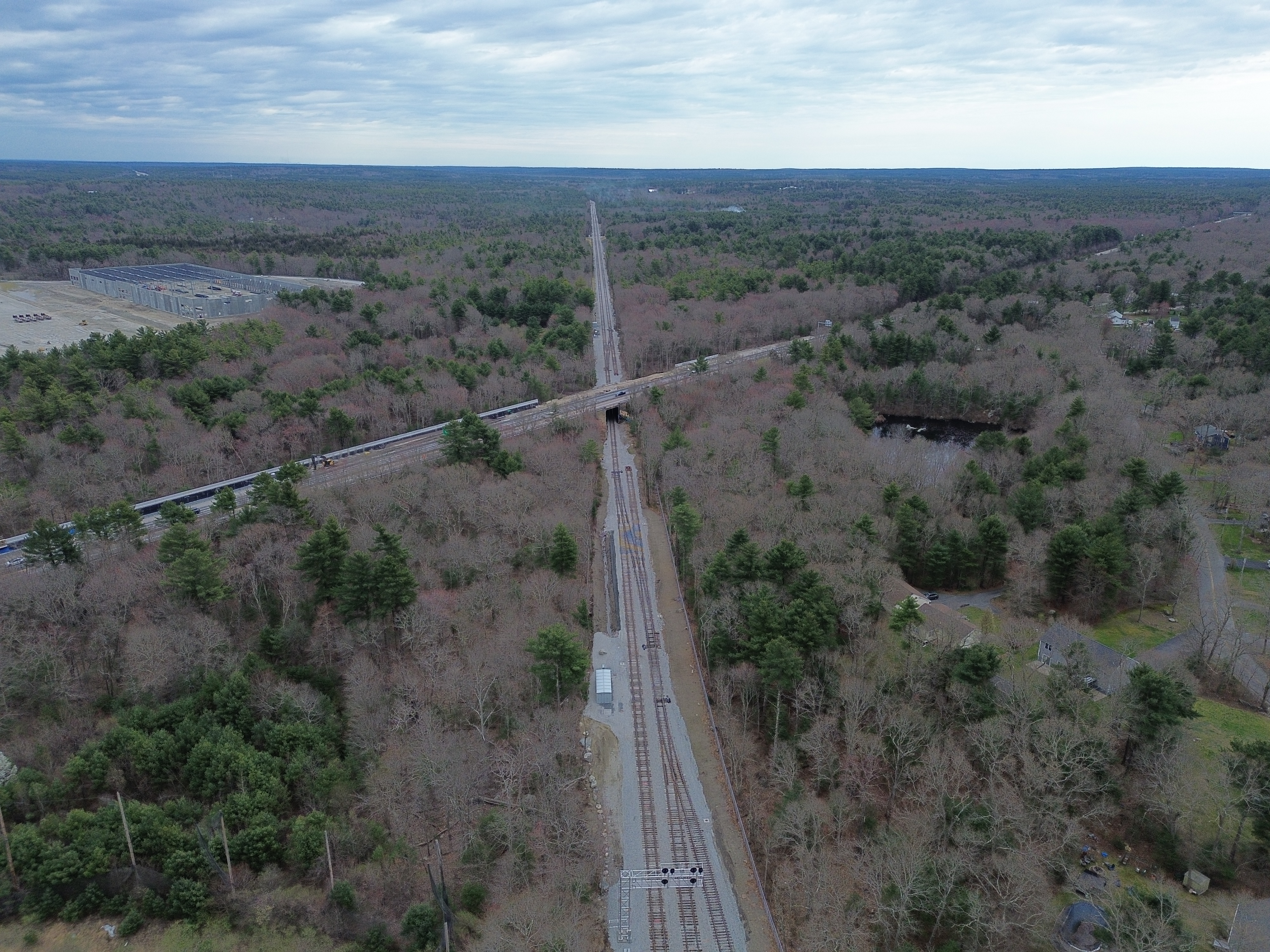
- New Bedford Main Line as it passes under Massachusetts Route 24

Overview
- Other name(s): New Bedford Subdivision
- Status: Operational
- Owner: Massachusetts Bay Transportation Authority
- Locale: Bristol County, Massachusetts
- Termini: Weir Junction; New Bedford
- Stations: 3

Service
- Type: Freight rail Commuter rail
- System: Massachusetts Coastal Railroad; MBTA Commuter Rail
- Services: Fall River/New Bedford Line

History
- Opened: March 24, 2025 (MBTA service)

Technical
- Line length: 18.5 miles (29.8 km)
- Track gauge: 4 ft 8 1/2 in (1,435 mm) standard gauge
- Operating speed: 79 miles per hour (127 km/h)

The New Bedford Main Line, also known as the New Bedford Subdivision, is a passenger and freight railroad line in the U.S. state of Massachusetts owned by the Massachusetts Bay Transportation Authority, with freight operations handled by the Massachusetts Coastal Railroad. The line runs from Cotley Junction where it meets the Middleboro Secondary near Weir Village (in Taunton) south to New Bedford along a former New York, New Haven and Hartford Railroad line. The Fall River Secondary branches off at Myricks Junction.

== History ==
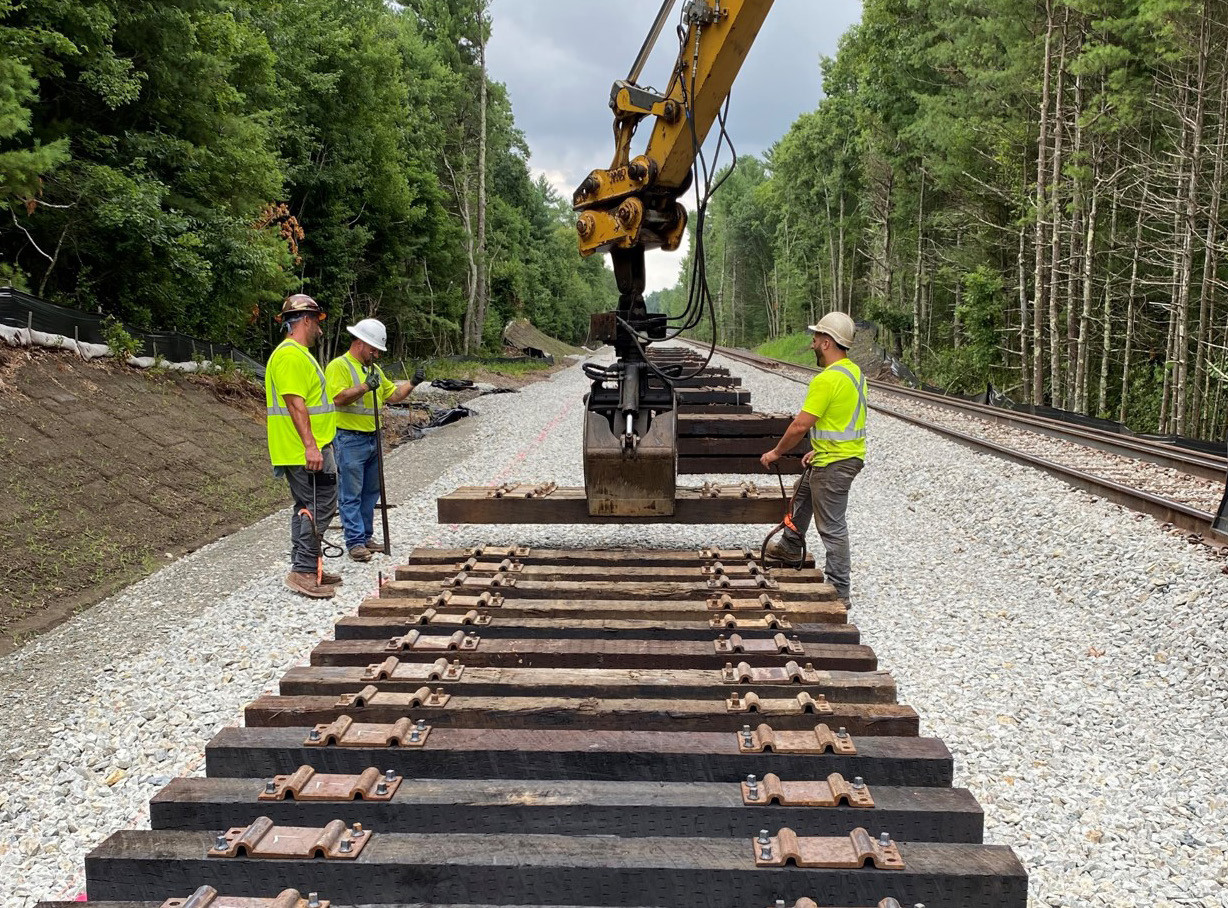
Track work for South Coast Rail in 2022

The New Bedford and Taunton Railroad completed the line from Taunton south to New Bedford in 1840. It became part of the NYNH&H until 1968. Penn Central took over in 1968, Then Conrail took over in 1976. The New Bedford subdivision was assigned to CSX in 1999 after the breakup of Conrail.

On October 2, 2008, the state government announced an agreement with CSX Transportation for the purchase and upgrade of several of CSX's freight lines in the state. CSX agreed to sell the Fall River Secondary and New Bedford Secondary for use by the South Coast Rail project, as well as the Grand Junction Branch, the Framingham-to-Worcester section of the Worcester Line, and the South Boston Running Track. Other parts of the agreement included plans for double-stack freights west of Worcester and the abandonment of Beacon Park Yard. The agreement was signed on September 23, 2009. On June 11, 2010, the state and CSX completed the first phase of the agreement, including the transfer of the South Coast Rail lines to MassDOT; the Massachusetts Coastal Railroad assumed freight rights on the two lines. The two lines were sold for $21.5 million.

The MBTA issued a $403.5 million contract for the Middleborough Secondary and New Bedford Main Line portions of the project on August 24, 2020. The work included reconstruction of the New Bedford Main Line for passenger service and construction of stations at East Taunton, Church Street, and New Bedford. Fall River/New Bedford Line service began using the route on March 24, 2025.

== See also ==
- List of CSX Transportation lines
