= Freetown station =

Railway station in Freetown, Massachusetts, US

Freetown
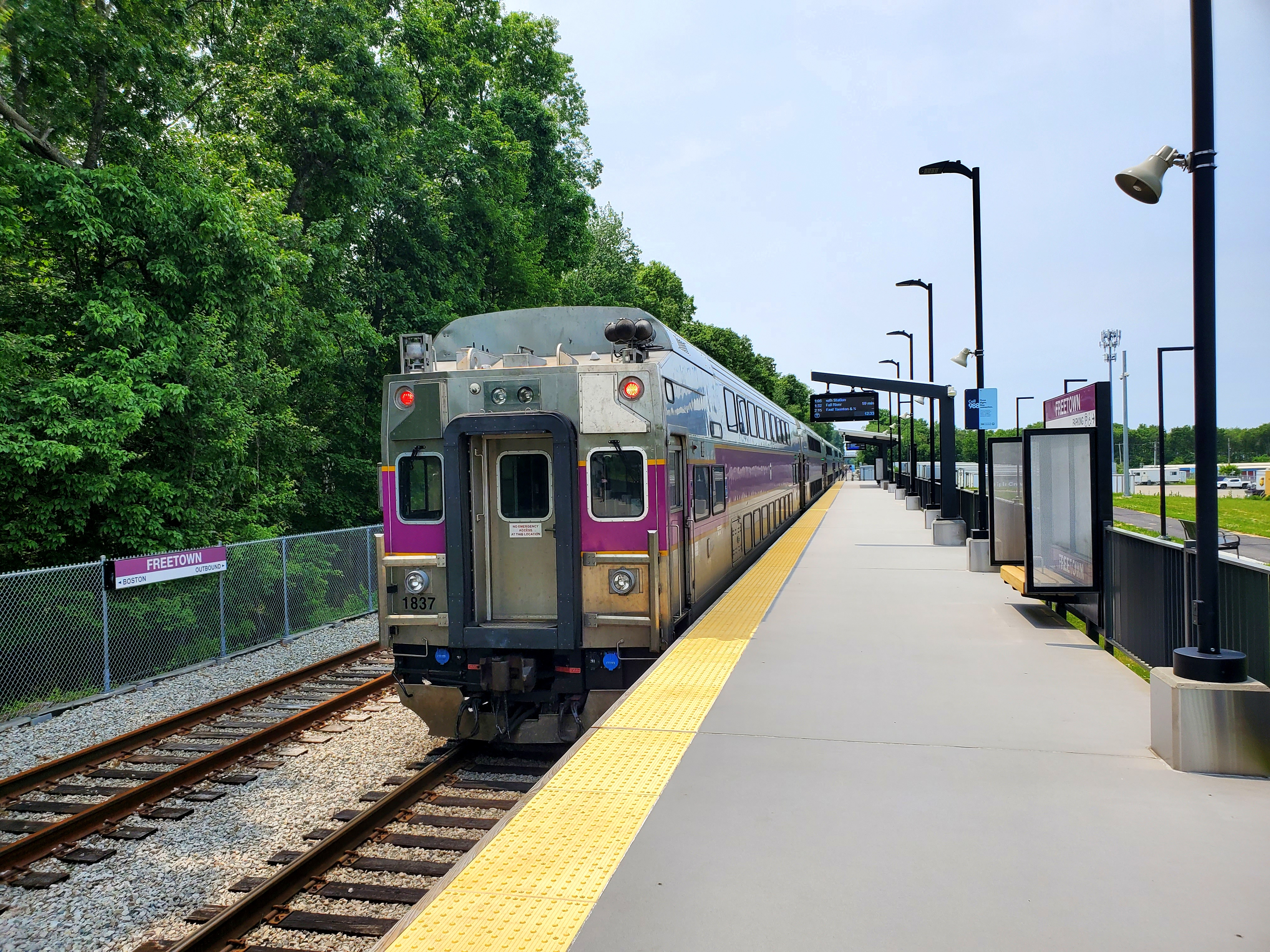
- A train at Freetown station in June 2025

General information
- Location: 153 South Main Street; Assonet, Freetown, Massachusetts
- Coordinates: 41°46′25.5″N 71°5′25.5″W
- Line: Fall River Secondary
- Platforms: 1 side platform
- Tracks: 2

Construction
- Parking: 170 spaces
- Cycle facilities: 8 spaces
- Accessible: Yes

Other information
- Fare zone: 8

History
- Opened: March 24, 2025

Passengers
- 2030: 60 (projected weekday boardings)

Services
Preceding station	MBTA	Following station
East Taunton toward South Station	Fall River/New Bedford Line	Fall River Terminus
Former services at Crystal Springs station
Preceding station	New York, New Haven and Hartford Railroad	Following station
Assonet toward Boston	Boston–Fall River	Somerset Junction toward Fall River
Location

Freetown station is an MBTA Commuter Rail station located in the Assonet village of Freetown, Massachusetts. The station is served by the Fall River Branch of the Fall River/New Bedford Line. It opened on March 24, 2025, as part of the first phase of the South Coast Rail project. The station has a single side platform on the west side of the Fall River Secondary, along with a park and ride lot.

The Fall River Railroad opened through Freetown in 1845. Two stations on the line in Freetown were open until the 1930s. Freetown was announced as a potential South Coast Rail station in 2009. The planned station site was relocated slightly to the northeast in 2018. A construction contract was issued in 2020, and the station was substantially completed in December 2022.

== Station design ==
Freetown station is located in the southwestern part of the Assonet village in Freetown between the South Main Street and the Route Massachusetts Route 24/79 expressway. It has a single 800-foot (240 m)-long high-level side platform on the west side of the single main track of the Fall River Secondary. A freight passing siding is located on the east side of the main track. A 107-space park and ride lot with a kiss-and-ride lane is located next to the platform, with a driveway to South Main Street. A canopy covers the portion of the platform adjacent to the entrance from the parking lot, with smaller canopies near the ends of the platform.

== History ==
=== Previous stations ===
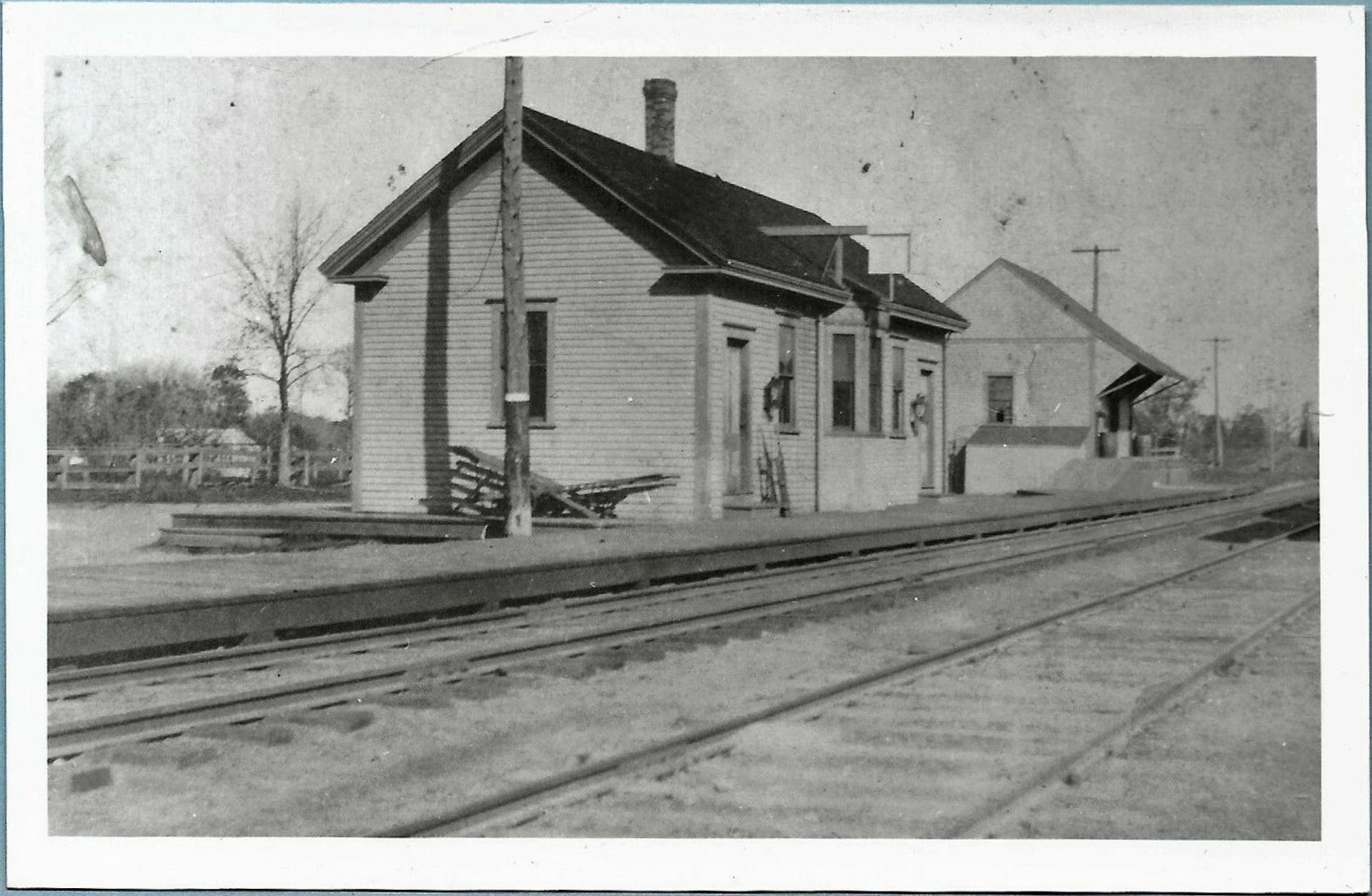
A postcard of Assonet station

The Fall River Railroad opened from Fall River to Myricks on June 9, 1845; it was completed to South Braintree in December 1846. Two stations were located on the line in Freetown: Assonet at Elm Street, and Crystal Spring (Thwaites) at Copicut Road. Somerset Junction (Millers), the junction with the 1866-opened Dighton and Somerset Railroad, was located further to the south in northern Fall River near the Freetown border. Service was consolidated in 1854 under the Old Colony and Fall River Railroad (later the Old Colony Railroad); the Old Colony was leased to the New Haven Railroad in 1893.

Passenger service on the line continued until September 5, 1958, except for a discontinuance from 1949 to 1952. However, most local stops including Assonet, Crystal Spring, and Somerset Junction were discontinued by the 1930s; by the end of service, trains ran nonstop from Fall River to Taunton. The line continued to be used for freight service by the New Haven and its successors Penn Central and Conrail, then finally as the CSX Fall River Subdivision.

=== South Coast Rail ===
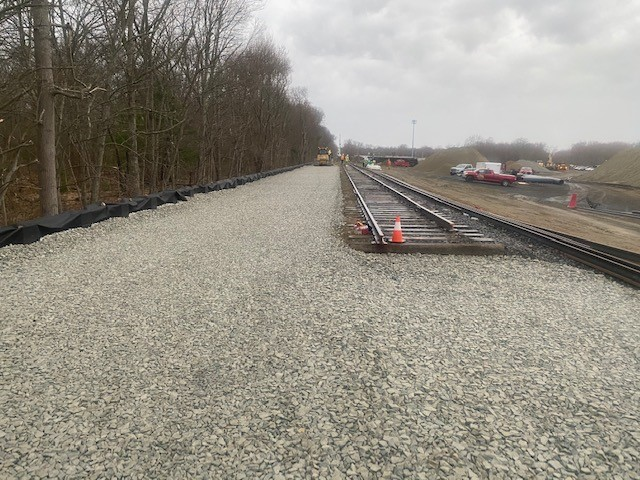
Construction of the new passing siding in April 2021

In September 2008, MassDOT released 18 potential station sites for the South Coast Rail project, including a Freetown station off South Main Street near the Route 24/79 expressway. A 2009 conceptual design called for a single side platform serving one track, with a second track allowing freight trains to pass the high-level platform. The station was planned to be the anchor of Assonet Village, a new mixed-use transit-oriented development village. Station plans released as part of the Final Environmental Impact Report in 2013 were nearly identical to the 2009 plans. On June 11, 2010, the state took ownership of the Fall River Subdivision (renamed the Fall River Secondary) and several other CSX lines as part of a sale agreement.

In 2017, the project was re-evaluated due to cost issues. A new proposal released in March 2017 called for early service via Middleborough by 2024, followed by full service via Stoughton by 2029. Freetown would have only been built as an infill station during the second phase. By mid-2017, plans called for the first phase to be completed in 2022, and to include stations at Freetown and Battleship Cove in Phase 1 rather than Phase 2. The January 2018 Draft Supplemental Environmental Impact Report moved the planned station about 0.2 miles (0.3 km) northeast, as the previously planned site had been developed for use by a business.

The MBTA awarded a $159 million contract for construction of the Fall River Secondary portion of the project, including Freetown station, in May 2020. Service was then planned to begin in November 2023. The station was 27% complete by February 2022, with 82% of platform foundations complete. Substantial completion of the Fall River Secondary work was announced at an event at Freetown station in December 2022. Opening was delayed to mid-2024 in September 2023. In June 2024, the opening of the project was delayed to May 2025. Service began on March 24, 2025. The station was planned to be served by an extension of Southeastern Regional Transit Authority bus route 102 to the station, but the extension was not made.
