= Battleship Cove station =

Planned railway station in Fall River, Massachusetts, USA

Battleship Cove
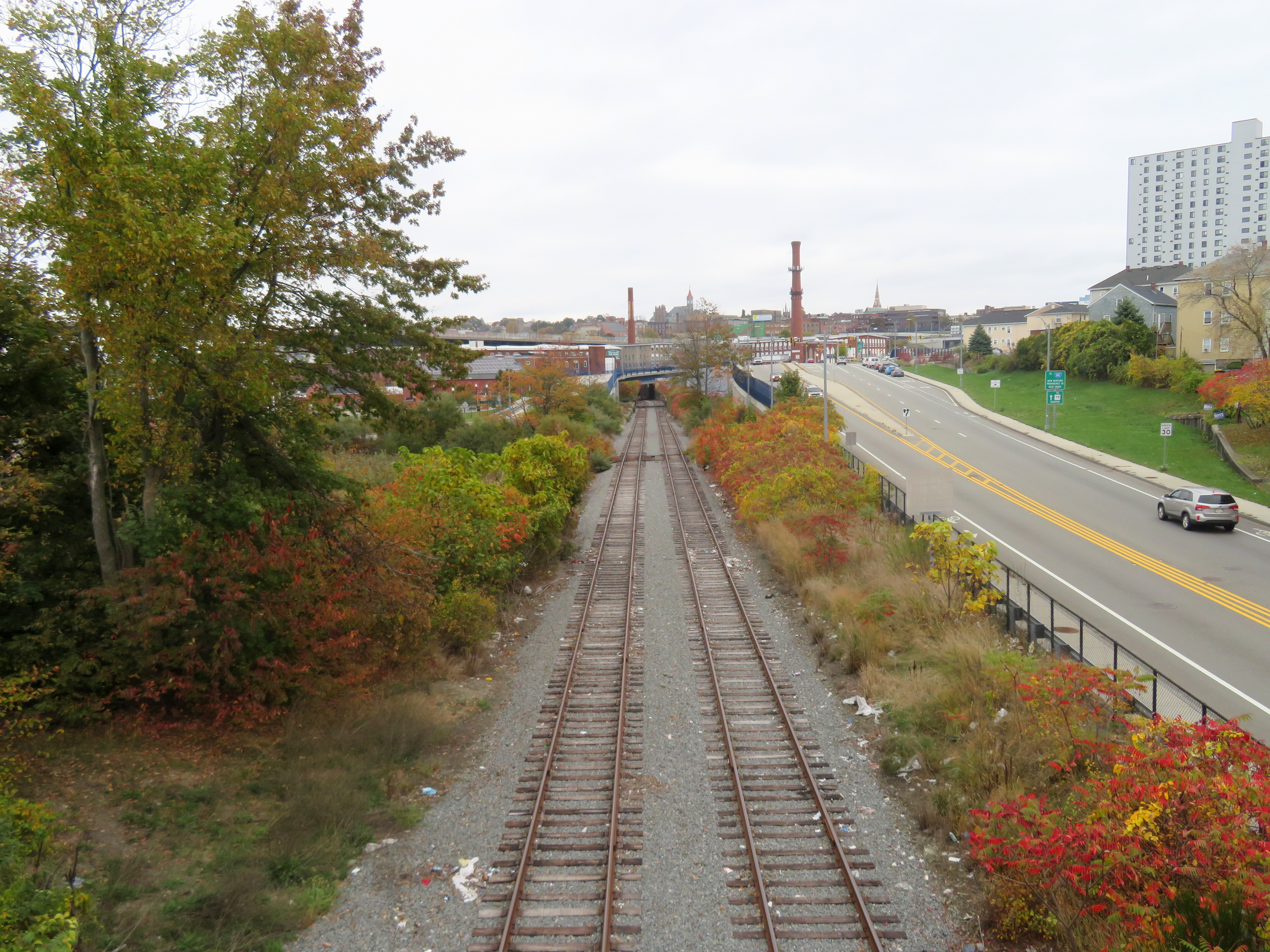
- The planned station site, seen in October 2020

General information
- Location: Ponta Delgada Boulevard; Fall River, Massachusetts
- Coordinates: 41°42′5.74″N 71°9′48.50″W
- Line: Fall River Subdivision
- Platforms: 1 side platform (planned)
- Tracks: 2

Construction
- Parking: None
- Cycle facilities: 10 spaces (planned)
- Accessible: Yes

History
- Opening: 2030 (planned)
- Closed: September 5, 1958 (previous station)

Planned services
Preceding station	MBTA	Following station
Fall River toward South Station	South Coast Rail	Terminus
Location

Battleship Cove is a proposed MBTA Commuter Rail station in Fall River, Massachusetts. It is planned to be the southern terminus of the Fall River branch of the South Coast Rail project, and is set to open in 2030 as part of the project's Phase II. The station will have no parking—it is intended for tourists visiting Battleship Cove and the Fall River waterfront, with Fall River station to the north serving commuters—and will be open seasonally. Previous passenger service to Fall River included stations at Fall River Wharf (1847–1937) and Ferry Street (1864–1958). The Wharf station was the terminus of the Fall River Line steamship service.

== History ==
=== Previous stations ===
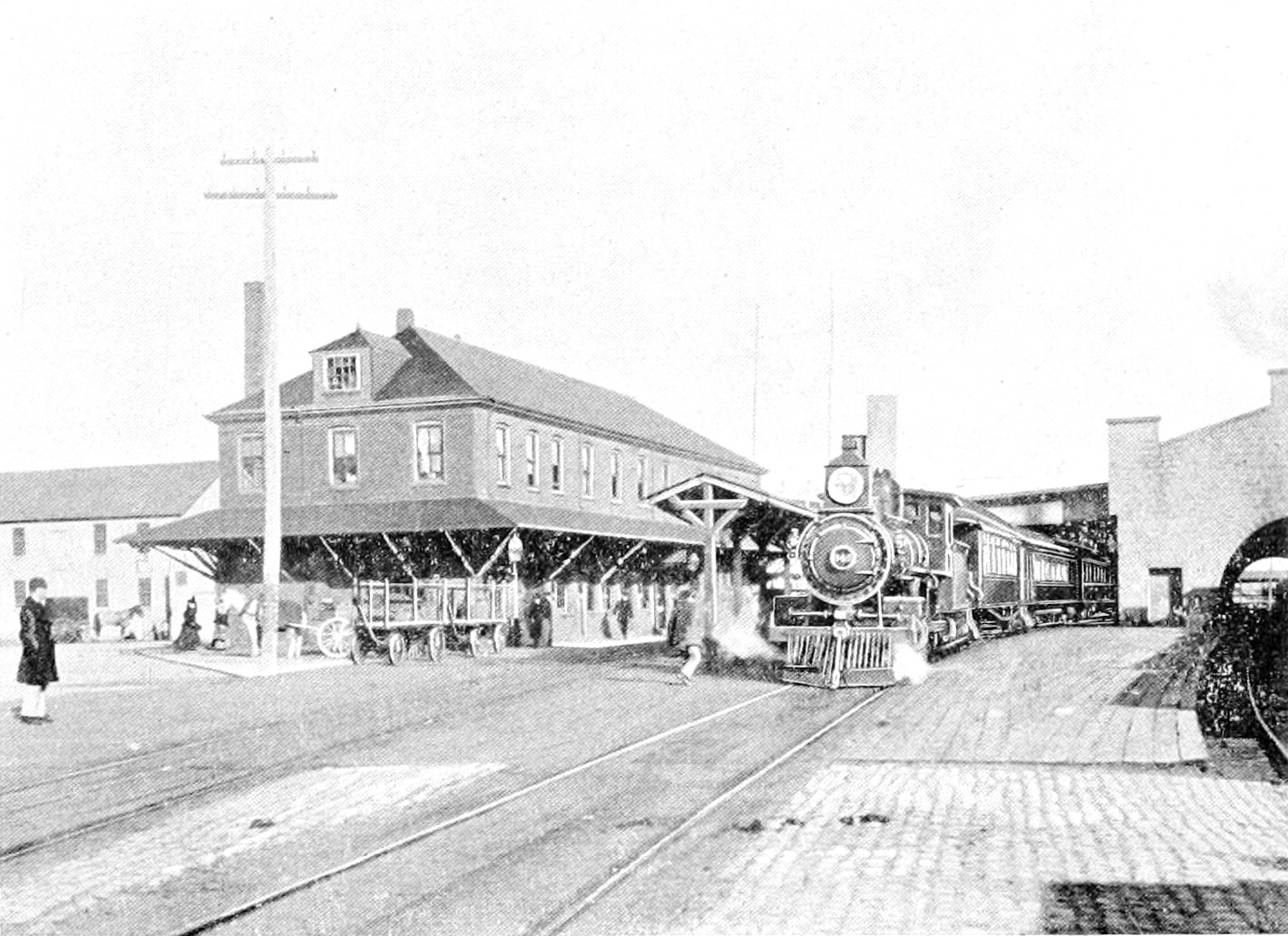
The Boat Train at Fall River Wharf station around 1900

The Fall River Railroad opened from Myricks to Fall River on June 9, 1845, and to the Old Colony Railroad at South Braintree in December 1846. The first Fall River station was located at the south end of a short tunnel under Central Street. It was a two-story building measuring 75 by 180 feet (23 m × 55 m). A temporary depot further north was used until the Central Street tunnel was completed in September 1845. In October 1847, the Fall River and Old Colony began running the Boston–Fall River Boat Train, which met Fall River Line steamers from New York at the Fall River Wharf; the Central Street station closed at that time. The two railroads merged as the Old Colony and Fall River Railroad in 1854. The former station was converted to store coal in 1858.

In 1862, the railroad began construction of a line south to Newport, Rhode Island. The former station was demolished to make room for the extension. The line to Newport opened in November 1863; the railroad was renamed as the Old Colony and Newport Railway. The extension prompted local debate about where to place a station. The railroad preferred a location at Ferry Street south of the wharf, while the city preferred a site near Metacomet Mill closer to the downtown area. An agreement was eventually made for two stations: one at Ferry Street (often simply called Fall River) in the South End, and one near Turner Street in the North End. The Ferry Street station opened by mid-1864.

Newport was the terminal of the steamers until 1869, when they returned to Fall River. The railroad changed names again to become the Old Colony Railroad in 1872. The Old Colony in turn became part of the New Haven Railroad in 1893. A rail yard was located near the station; the New Haven constructed a new roundhouse in 1927.

Steamship service between Fall River and New York ended in 1937, and passenger service between Fall River and Newport ended the next year. Passenger service to Boston, with Ferry Street as the terminal, continued (except for 1949–1952) until September 5, 1958. The line continued to be used for freight service by the New Haven and its successors Penn Central and Conrail, then finally as the CSX Fall River Subdivision. After the state purchased the line in 2010, freight service (which runs only as far south as Ferry Street) was transferred to the Massachusetts Coastal Railroad.

=== New station ===
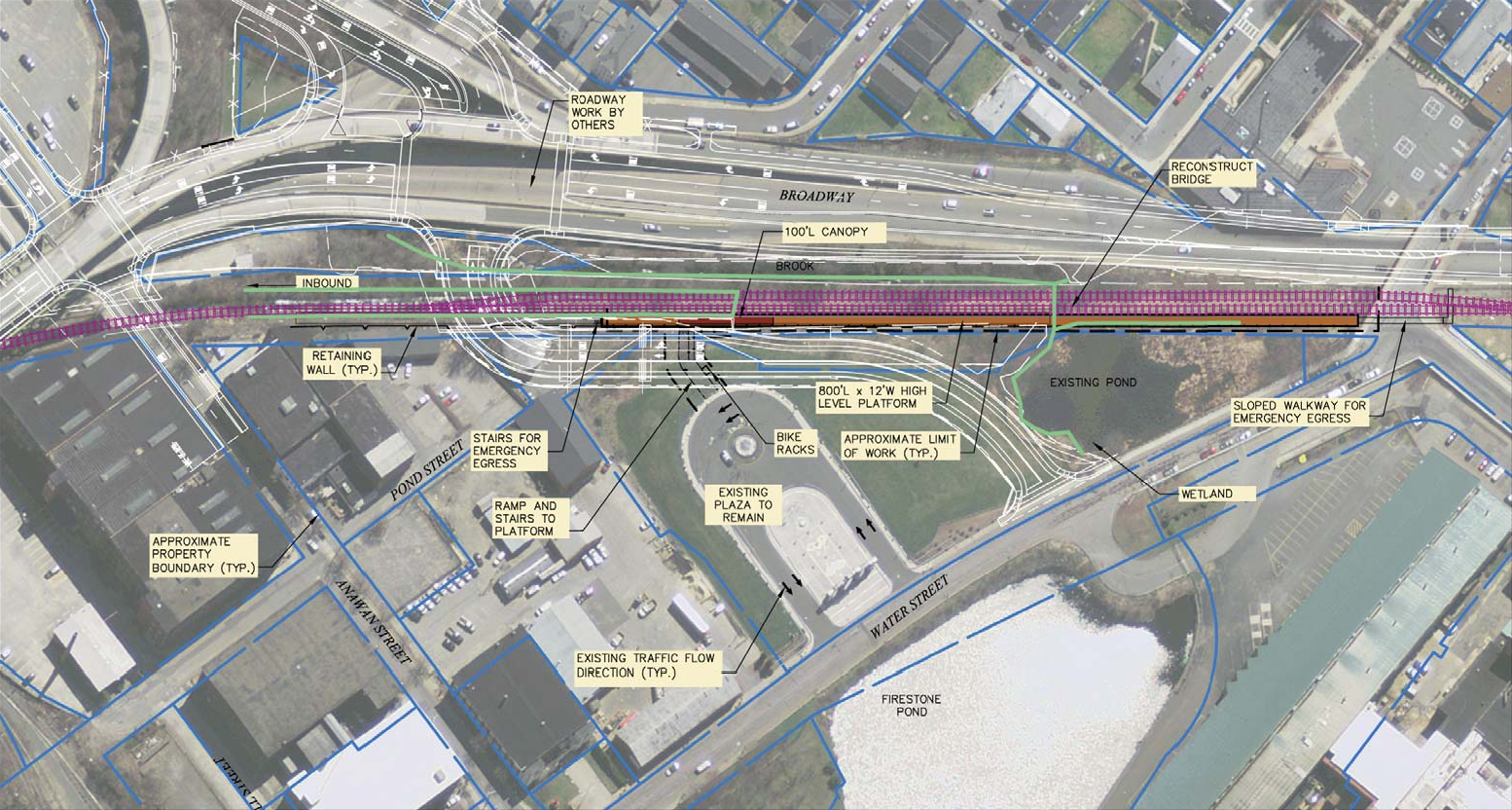
The station design proposed in 2013

In September 2008, MassDOT released 18 potential station sites for the South Coast Rail project, including two sites in Fall River. Fall River station would be a full-time station serving commuters, while Battleship Cove station would be a seasonal station for tourists visiting Battleship Cove and the Fall River waterfront. A 2009 conceptual design called for a single side platform serving one track, with access at the center of the platform from City Gates Plaza. Plans released as part of the Final Environmental Impact Report in 2013 moved the platform about 400 feet (120 m) to the south, and added a second track for freight trains to pass the station.

In 2017, the project was re-evaluated due to cost issues. A new proposal released in March 2017 called for early service via Middleborough by 2024, followed by full service via Stoughton by 2029. Battleship Cove would have only been built during the second phase. By mid-2017, plans called for the first phase to be completed in 2022, and to include stations at Freetown and Battleship Cove in Phase 1 rather than Phase 2. However, the Draft Supplemental Environmental Impact Report released in January 2018 pushed Battleship Cove back to Phase II.
