= Fall River Secondary =

Railway line in Massachusetts

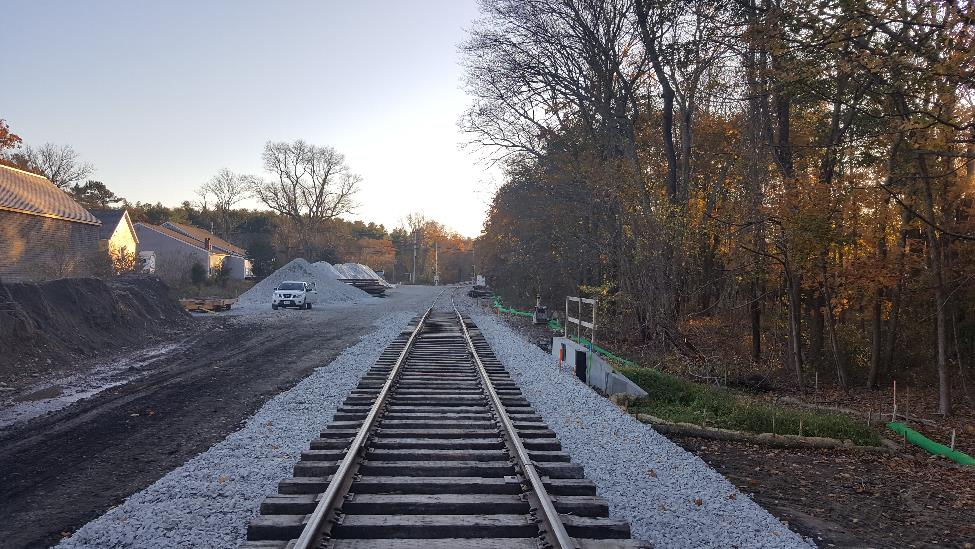
- Construction on the Fall River Secondary in 2019

Overview
- Status: Operational
- Owner: Massachusetts Bay Transportation Authority
- Locale: Bristol County, Massachusetts
- Termini: New Bedford Subdivision in Myricks, Massachusetts; Newport Line in Tiverton, Rhode Island
- Stations: 2

Service
- Type: Freight rail, commuter rail
- System: Massachusetts Coastal Railroad; MBTA Commuter Rail
- Services: Fall River/New Bedford Line

History
- Opened: March 24, 2025 (MBTA service)

Technical
- Line length: 14.2 miles (22.9 km)
- Track gauge: 4 ft 8 1/2 in (1,435 mm) standard gauge
- Operating speed: 79 miles per hour (127 km/h)

The Fall River Secondary (also called the Fall River Subdivision) is a passenger and freight railroad line in the U.S. state of Massachusetts, owned by the Massachusetts Bay Transportation Authority, with freight operations handled by the Massachusetts Coastal Railroad; it was formerly owned and operated by CSX Transportation. The line runs from the New Bedford Subdivision at Myricks (in Berkley) south to Fall River along a former New York, New Haven and Hartford Railroad line. At its south end, at the Rhode Island state line in Fall River, it becomes a line of the Providence and Worcester Railroad.

== History ==
The Fall River Branch Railroad completed the line from Myricks south to Fall River in 1845. The Old Colony and Newport Railway extended the line to Newport, Rhode Island, in 1864. The line later became part of the NYNH&H until 1958. Penn Central then took over in 1968, followed by Conrail, who took over in 1976. The Fall River Subdivision was assigned to CSX in 1999 after the breakup of Conrail.

On October 2, 2008, the state government announced an agreement with CSX Transportation for the purchase and upgrade of several of CSX's freight lines in the state. CSX agreed to sell the Fall River Secondary and New Bedford Secondary for use by the South Coast Rail project, as well as the Grand Junction Branch, the Framingham-to-Worcester section of the Worcester Line, and the South Boston Running Track. Other parts of the agreement included plans for double-stack freights west of Worcester and the abandonment of Beacon Park Yard. The agreement was signed on September 23, 2009. On June 11, 2010, the state and CSX completed the first phase of the agreement, including the transfer of the South Coast Rail lines to MassDOT; the Massachusetts Coastal Railroad assumed freight rights on the two lines. The two lines were sold for $21.5 million.

In May 2020, MassDOT issued a construction contract for the Fall River Secondary. The work included construction of Freetown station and Fall River station, 12.1 miles (19.5 km) of track work, rehabilitation of 10 grade crossings and 8 bridges, and construction of Weaver's Cove layover yard in northern Fall River. Construction was estimated to take 30 months. Fall River/New Bedford Line service began using the route on March 24, 2025.

== See also ==
- List of CSX Transportation lines
