= Fall River station =

Railway station in Fall River, Massachusetts, US

Fall River Depot
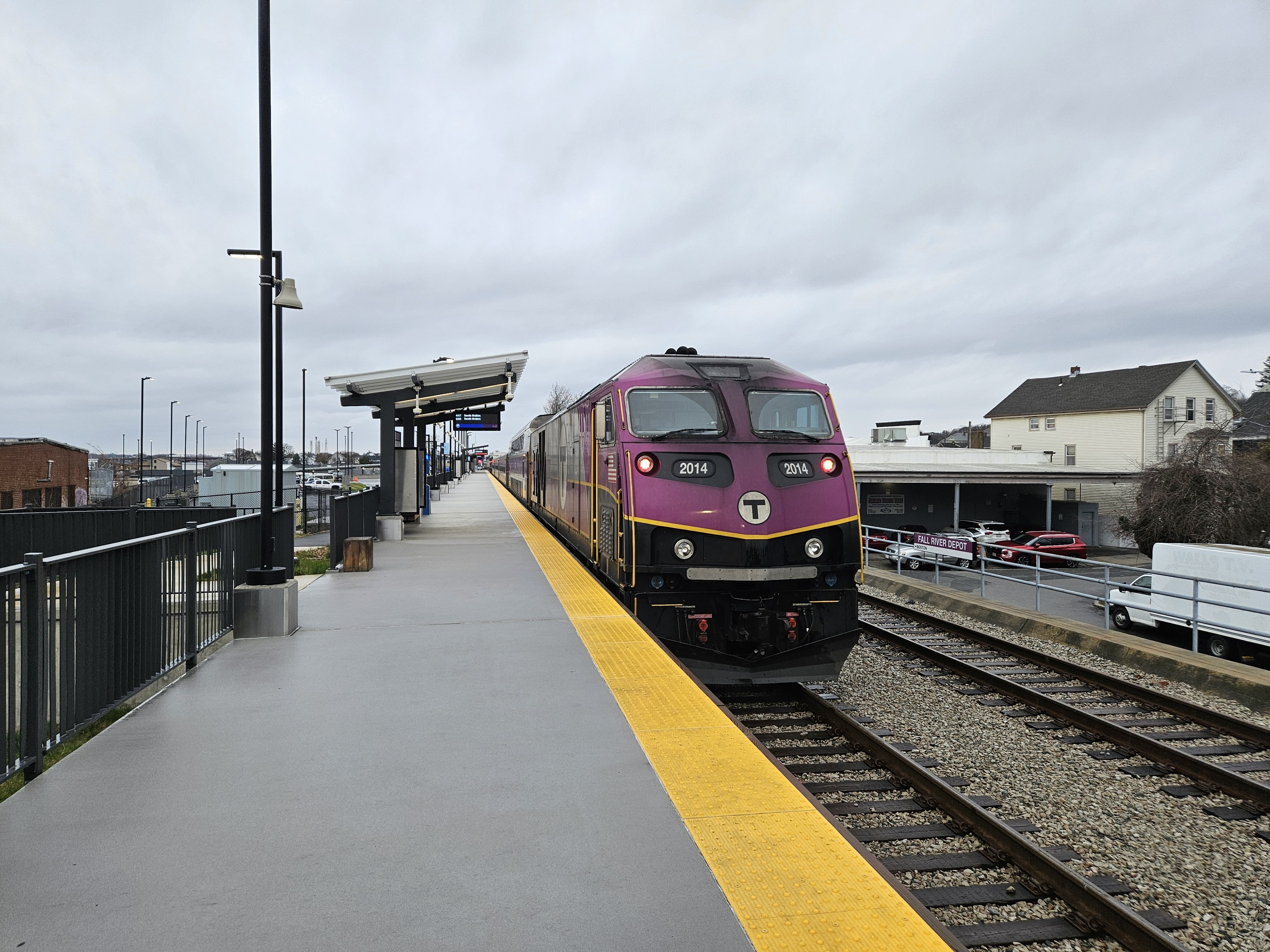
- A train at Fall River station in April 2025

General information
- Location: 825 Davol Street; Fall River, Massachusetts
- Coordinates: 41.714152°N 71.154079°W
- Line: Fall River Secondary
- Platforms: 1 side platform
- Tracks: 2
- Connections: SRTA: 102

Construction
- Parking: 513 spaces
- Cycle facilities: 8 spaces
- Accessible: Yes

Other information
- Fare zone: 8

History
- Opened: August 12, 1867 (previous station); March 24, 2025
- Closed: September 5, 1958 (previous station)
- Former names: Bowenville (until 1891)

Passengers
- 2030 (projected): 390 daily boardings

Services
Preceding station	MBTA	Following station
Freetown toward South Station	Fall River/New Bedford Line	Terminus
Former services
Preceding station	New York, New Haven and Hartford Railroad	Following station
Steep Brook toward Boston	Boston–Fall River	Terminus
Braleys toward Providence	Providence–Fall River	Terminus
Terminus	Fall River–Newport	Ferry Street toward Newport
Location

Fall River station (signed as Fall River Depot) is an MBTA Commuter Rail station in northern Fall River, Massachusetts. It opened on March 24, 2025, as part of the first phase of the South Coast Rail project. It is the southern terminal of the Fall River Branch of the Fall River/New Bedford Line. The station has a single side platform on the west side of the Fall River Secondary, along with a park and ride lot.

The Fall River Railroad opened to its namesake city in 1845. Bowenville station opened in the northern part of the city in 1867 under the Old Colony Railroad. It became the eastern terminal of the Fall River, Warren and Providence Railroad in 1875. A new station designed by Bradford Gilbert opened in 1891 and became the main station for the city. It saw passenger service until 1958. After over a decade of planning, construction of the modern station began in 2020.

== Station design ==
Fall River station is located about 1 mile (1.6 km) north of the downtown area near the junction of Route 79 and President Avenue (U.S. Route 6). It has a single 730-foot (220 m)-long high-level side platform on the west side of the single main track of the Fall River Secondary. A freight passing siding is located on the east side of the main track. A 220-space park and ride lot with a kiss-and-ride lane is located on the west side of the platform, with access from Davol Street on the west. A ramp and stairs connect to Pearce Street on the north side of the station. A canopy covers a portion of the platform adjacent to the entrance from the parking lot.

== History ==
=== Former station ===
==== Early stations ====
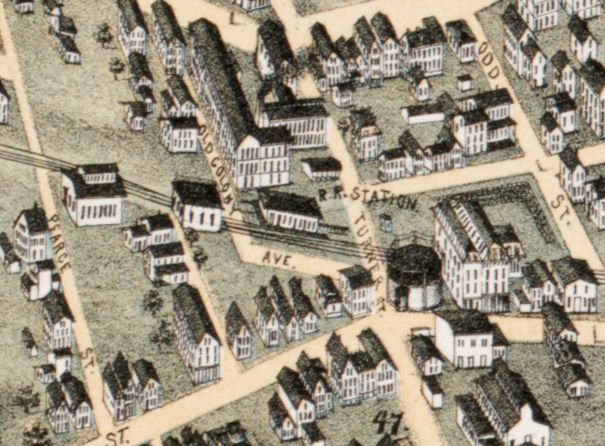
Bowenville station (center) on an 1877 map

The Fall River Railroad opened from Myricks to Fall River on June 9, 1845, and to the Old Colony Railroad at South Braintree in December 1846. The first Fall River station was located at the south end of a short tunnel under Central Street. It was a two-story building measuring 75 by 180 feet (23 m × 55 m). A temporary depot further north was used until the Central Street tunnel was completed in September 1845. In October 1847, the Fall River and Old Colony began running the Boston–Fall River Boat Train, which met Fall River Line steamers from New York at the Fall River Wharf; the Central Street station closed at that time. The two railroads merged as the Old Colony and Fall River Railroad in 1854. The former station was converted to store coal in 1858.

In 1862, the railroad began construction of a line south to Newport, Rhode Island. The former station was demolished to make room for the extension. The line to Newport opened in November 1863; the railroad was renamed as the Old Colony and Newport Railway. The extension prompted local debate about where to place a station. The railroad preferred a location at Ferry Street south of the wharf, while the city preferred a site near Metacomet Mill closer to the downtown area. An agreement was eventually made for two stations: one at Ferry Street in the South End, and one near Turner Street in the North End. The Ferry Street station opened by mid-1864; a two-story brick building was built at Maple Street for the North End station, but it never opened as a station.

The Dighton and Somerset Railroad opened in 1866, joining the Fall River mainline at Somerset Junction, north of Fall River. Trains began stopping at Bowenville in the north part of Fall River on August 12, 1867. A wooden station building measuring 18 by 64 feet (5.5 m × 19.5 m) was constructed. The station was named for the nearby neighborhood, itself named for the estate of the Bowen family. The railroad changed names again to become the Old Colony Railroad in 1872. The Old Colony built a new station building at Bowenville in early 1874 and enlarged it in 1878. It was located on the east side of the tracks between Turner Street and Old Colony Street. A branch of the Providence, Warren and Bristol Railroad (known as the Fall River, Warren and Providence Railroad) opened over the new Slade's Ferry Bridge on December 6, 1875, connecting to the Fall River mainline north of Bowenville. The line was doubled-tracked between Somerset Junction and the Central Street tunnel in 1882; the unused station at Maple Street was demolished at that time.

==== 1891 station ====
The Globe Street Railway opened its first horsecar line on North Main Street between Bowenville and downtown Fall River in July 1880. A short spur on Old Colony Avenue to Bowenville station opened that November. Between the horsecar connection and the northward growth of the city, Bowenville soon became Fall River's main railroad station. The Old Colony began planning a new station at Pearce Street around 1883. However, the company soon reached an impasse with the city, which desired to open Pearce Street across the tracks and create a new grade crossing. The street had been legally established in 1873 and laid out in 1874, but the railroad built fences to block access across the tracks.

In May 1886, the city alderman ordered the railroad to remove the fences and open the crossing. The Old Colony obtained a temporary injunction; it sought a permanent injunction in July 1886. That month, the state railroad commissioners issued a report on the dispute. They noted that the existing Bowenville station was responsible for two-thirds of the rail traffic in the city and was inadequate for that purpose. Stating that opening the street in close proximity to a station would "create a grade crossing of the most dangerous kind", the commissioners advised against the construction of a new station if the crossing was opened. By that time, the railroad was also considering acquisition of the Fall River Iron Works property near the wharf in order to build a central passenger station and freight yard.

The case was heard by Oliver Wendell Holmes Jr. for the Massachusetts Supreme Judicial Court, which ruled in October 1888 that the city had the right to establish the crossing. Although the Old Colony continued to offer a new station in return for the street being abandoned, the grade crossing was opened on December 28, 1888. The next year, the railroad proposed to build a bridge to carry Pearce Street over the tracks. In April 1890, the Old Colony made a new offer to the city: the railroad would build an underpass to carry President Avenue under the tracks, construct a new station, and pay any damages to abutters for closure of Pearce Street. The city accepted the offer that July; the Pearce Street crossing was closed on August 20.

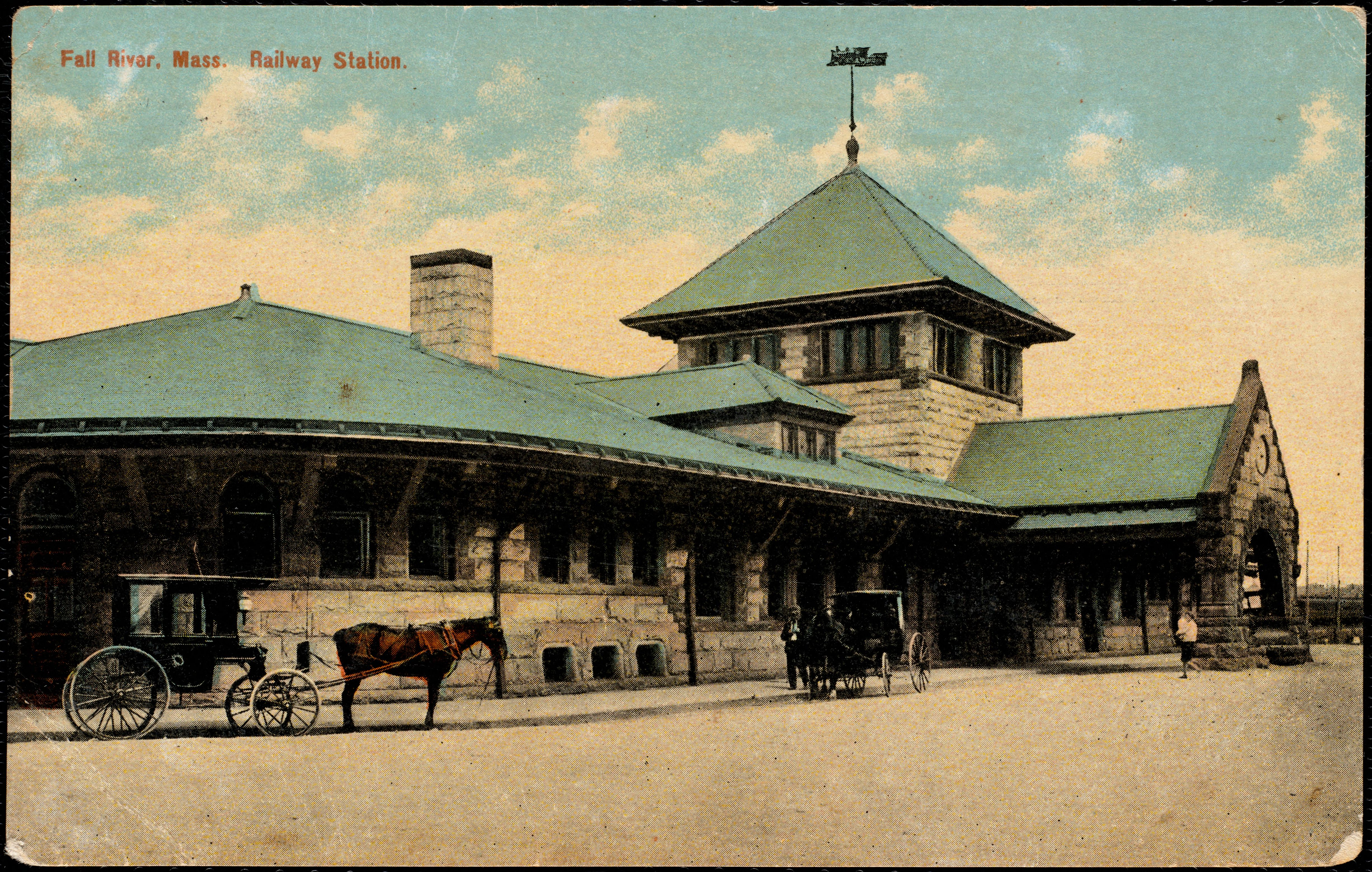
Postcard of the 1891-built station

Plans for the new station by Bradford Gilbert were shown to the public in September 1890. At that time, the railroad yielded to the city's request to use granite rather than brick. Bowenville station was used by 2,000 to 3,000 daily riders by then. Construction began in December 1890. In August 1891, the railroad announced that the new station would be named Fall River since it would be the city's primary passenger station. Fall River station opened on November 9, 1891. The older Bowenville station building was moved away from the tracks and sold for reuse. Including land acquisition, the cost of the new station was nearly $100,000 (equivalent to $3.1 million in 2024).

Fall River station was located on the east side of the tracks between Baylies Street and Pearce Street, slightly north of the previous station. It measured 185 by 40 feet (56 m × 12 m) with rounded ends. The station was built of Milford pink granite trimmed with brown sandstone from Longmeadow. All exposed wood on the exterior was yellow pine. The roof was purple slate with dark red terracotta trim. At its center was a 25-foot (7.6 m)-square turret with a pyramidal roof. The station had a single concrete side platform used by all passenger trains. It was covered by a canopy attached to the station's roof. The Globe Street Railway built a spur track off its North Main Street line to the south end of the station.

A porte-cochère projected from the main entrance at the center of the east side of the building. It opened onto a loggia and ticket counter under the 30-foot (9.1 m) ceiling of the turret. Behind the ticket office were the telegraph office and agent's room, each with a bay window overlooking the tracks. To each side were the men's and women's waiting rooms, each 37 by 40 feet (11 m × 12 m), with floors and wainscotting of dark red oak. The women's (north) waiting room had an inglenook around a fireplace on the north wall, flanked by two alcoves that could be screened off for private use. One connected to a retiring room and bathroom. The men's waiting room had an open fireplace on the south wall, with a smoking room and bathroom connected to the waiting room. Both bathrooms had marble floors and walls. The north end of the station was occupied by the baggage room with the small mail room inside, while the south end held locker rooms for trainmen and hackmen.

==== 20th century ====
The station was raised 8 feet (2.4 m) as part of a 1902–1905 project that eliminated eleven grade crossings in the city. The New Haven operated electrified passenger service between Providence and Fall River from 1900 to 1934. Service to Providence, and to Taunton over the Dighton and Somerset, both ended in 1932. Newport service ended in 1938 due to the 88 stations case; Ferry Street station was closed until around 1950, leaving Fall River as a terminal. Fall River service was suspended from 1949 to 1952, and ultimately ended on September 5, 1958.

=== South Coast Rail ===
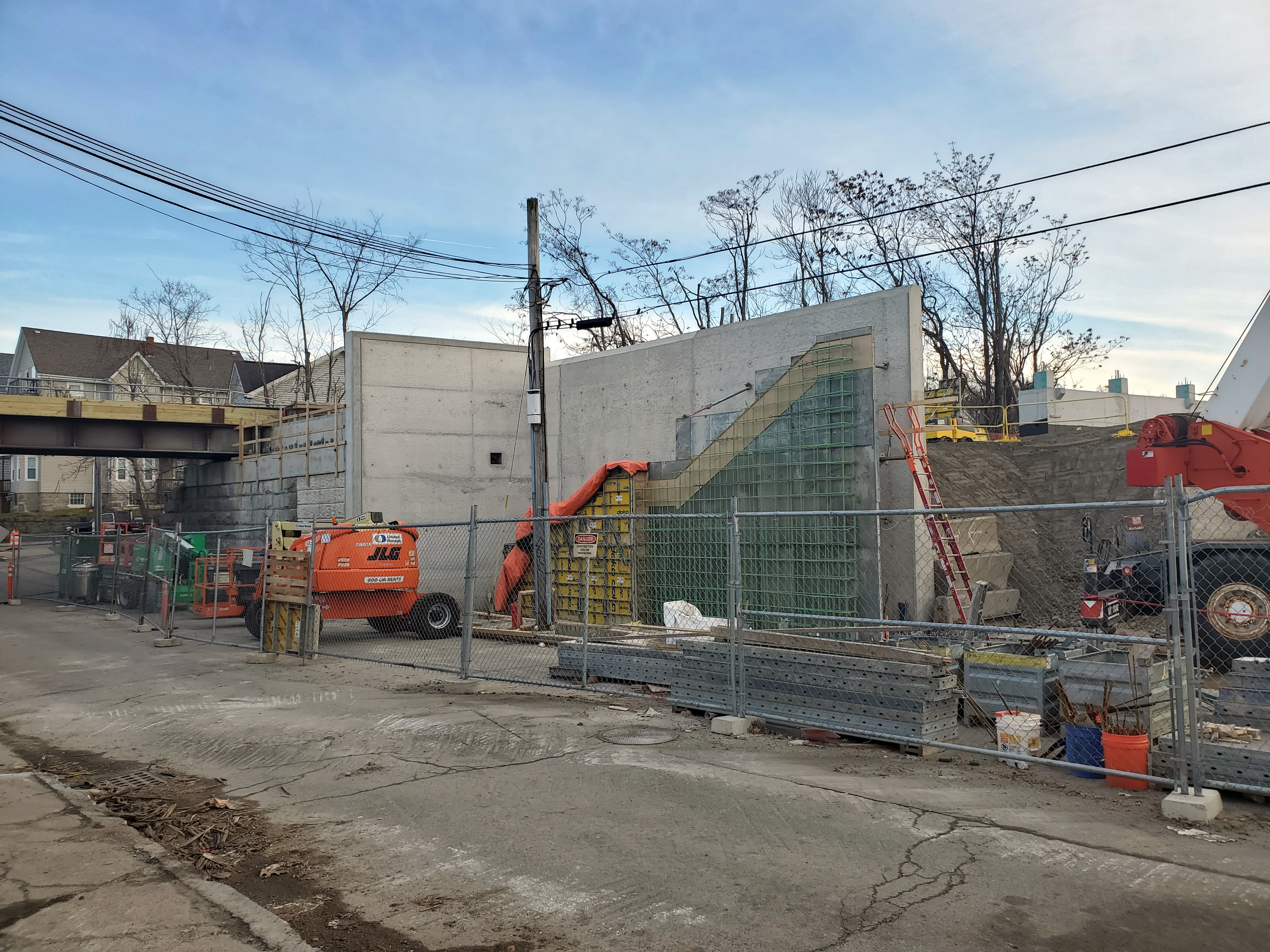
Retaining wall construction, November 2021

In September 2008, MassDOT released 18 potential station sites for the South Coast Rail project, including Fall River Depot off Davol Street. A 2009 conceptual design called for a single 730 ft (220 m) side platform serving the west track, with a second track allowing freight trains to pass the high-level platform; a two-story parking deck would be located on the west side of the tracks. Plans released as part of the Final Environmental Impact Report in 2013 were nearly identical. A 2009 corridor plan called for mixed-use transit-oriented development around the new station. On June 11, 2010, the state took ownership of the Fall River Subdivision and several other CSX lines as part of a sale agreement.

In 2017, the project was re-evaluated due to cost issues. A new proposal released in March 2017 called for early service via Middleborough by 2024, followed by full service via Stoughton by 2029. The January 2018 Draft Supplemental Environmental Impact Report reconfigured the planned parking lot configuration, as part of the previously planned deck site had been developed for use by a business. A parking lot on the west side of the tracks was to be constructed during Phase 1, with a possible eastern lot (on the site of an existing retail building) to be added later.

The MBTA awarded a $159 million contract for construction of the Fall River Secondary portion of the project, including Fall River station, in May 2020. Service was then planned to begin in November 2023. Two former industrial buildings were demolished in 2020 to make room for the station and its parking lot. The station was 32% complete by February 2022, with 96% of platform foundations and some retaining walls in place. Construction of the station reached 90% completion in October 2022, with the platform and canopies in place. Substantial completion of the Fall River Secondary work was announced in December 2022. Opening was delayed to mid-2024 in September 2023. In June 2024, the opening of the project was delayed to May 2025. Fall River station was complete by that time. Service began on March 24, 2025.
