= Church Street station (MBTA) =

Railway station in New Bedford, Massachusetts, US

Church Street
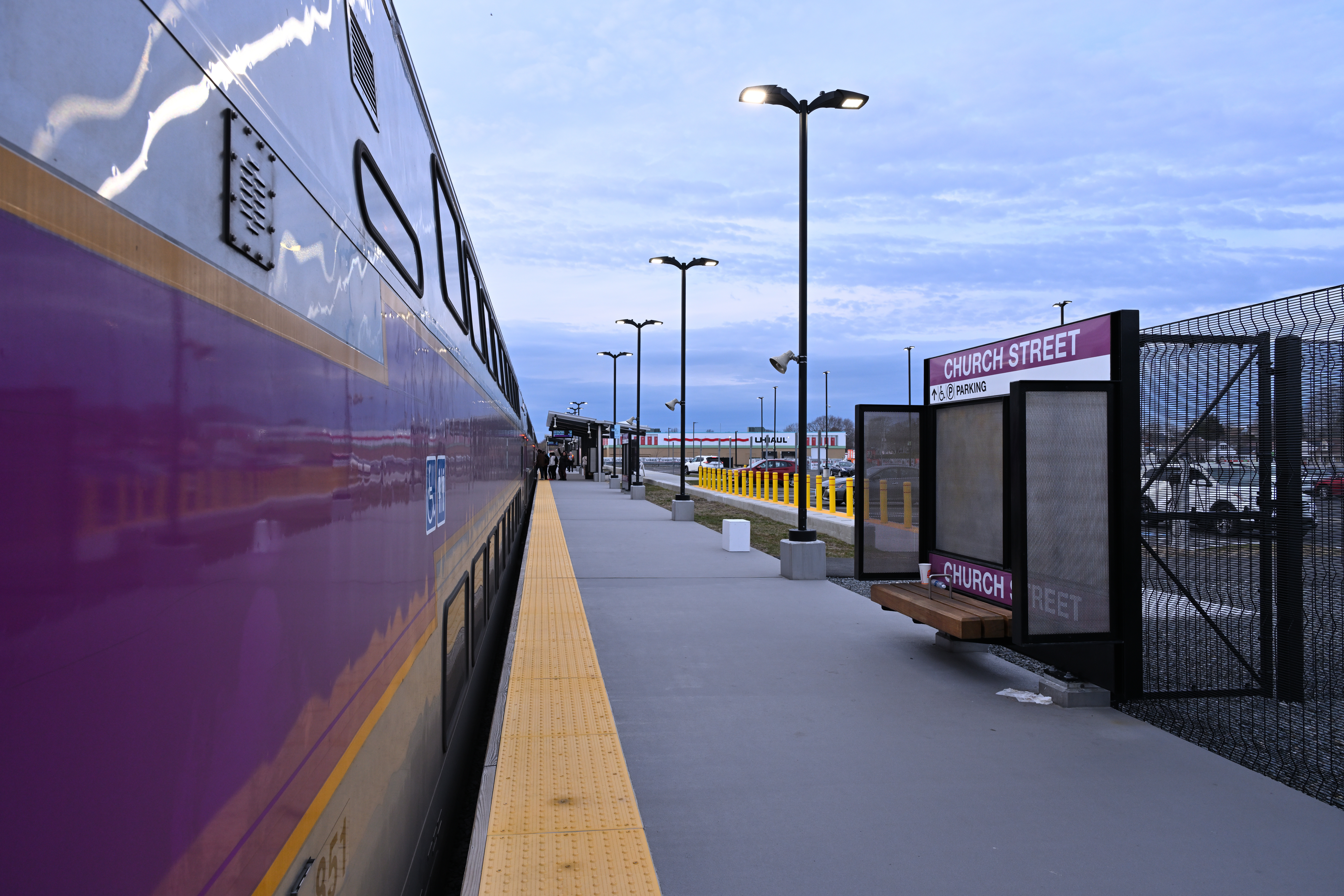
- Church Street station in March 2025

General information
- Location: 387 Church Street; New Bedford, Massachusetts
- Coordinates: 41°40′29″N 70°56′22″W
- Line: New Bedford Main Line
- Platforms: 1 side platform
- Tracks: 2

Construction
- Parking: 354 parking spaces
- Cycle facilities: 22 spaces
- Accessible: Yes

Other information
- Fare zone: 8

History
- Opened: March 24, 2025
- Closed: September 5, 1958 (former station)
- Former names: Acushnet

Passengers
- 2030: 260 weekday boardings (projected)

Services
Preceding station	MBTA	Following station
East Taunton toward South Station	Fall River/New Bedford Line	New Bedford Terminus
Former services
Preceding station	New York, New Haven and Hartford Railroad	Following station
Braleys toward Boston	Boston–New Bedford	Weld Street toward New Bedford
Location

Church Street station is an MBTA Commuter Rail station located in northern New Bedford, Massachusetts, United States. The station is served by the New Bedford Branch of the Fall River/New Bedford Line. It opened on March 24, 2025, as part of the first phase of the South Coast Rail project. The station has a single side platform on the east side of the New Bedford Subdivision, along with a park and ride lot.

The former Acushnet station, located slightly to the north of the modern station site, was served by the New York, New Haven and Hartford Railroad and several predecessors until around the 1930s. A site near Kings Highway in northern New Bedford was announced as a potential South Coast Rail station in 2009. Originally to be on the west side of the tracks, the planned station was moved to the east side and renamed North New Bedford in 2019. A construction contract was issued in 2020; that year, the station was again renamed as Church Street.

== Station design ==
The station is located west of Church Street approximately 1/3 mile (0.5 km) south of Tarkiln Hill Road in northern New Bedford, about 3 miles (4.8 km) north of downtown New Bedford and 1.5 miles (2.4 km) west of Acushnet Center. It has an 800-foot (240 m)-long accessible high-level side platform on the east side of the New Bedford Subdivision, which has one track plus a freight siding at the station location. A 182-foot (55 m)-long canopy covers part of the platform to provide shelter for passengers. The parking lot between the platform and Church Street has 354 parking spaces, 22 bicycle spaces, and a kiss-and-ride area,

== History ==
=== Acushnet station ===
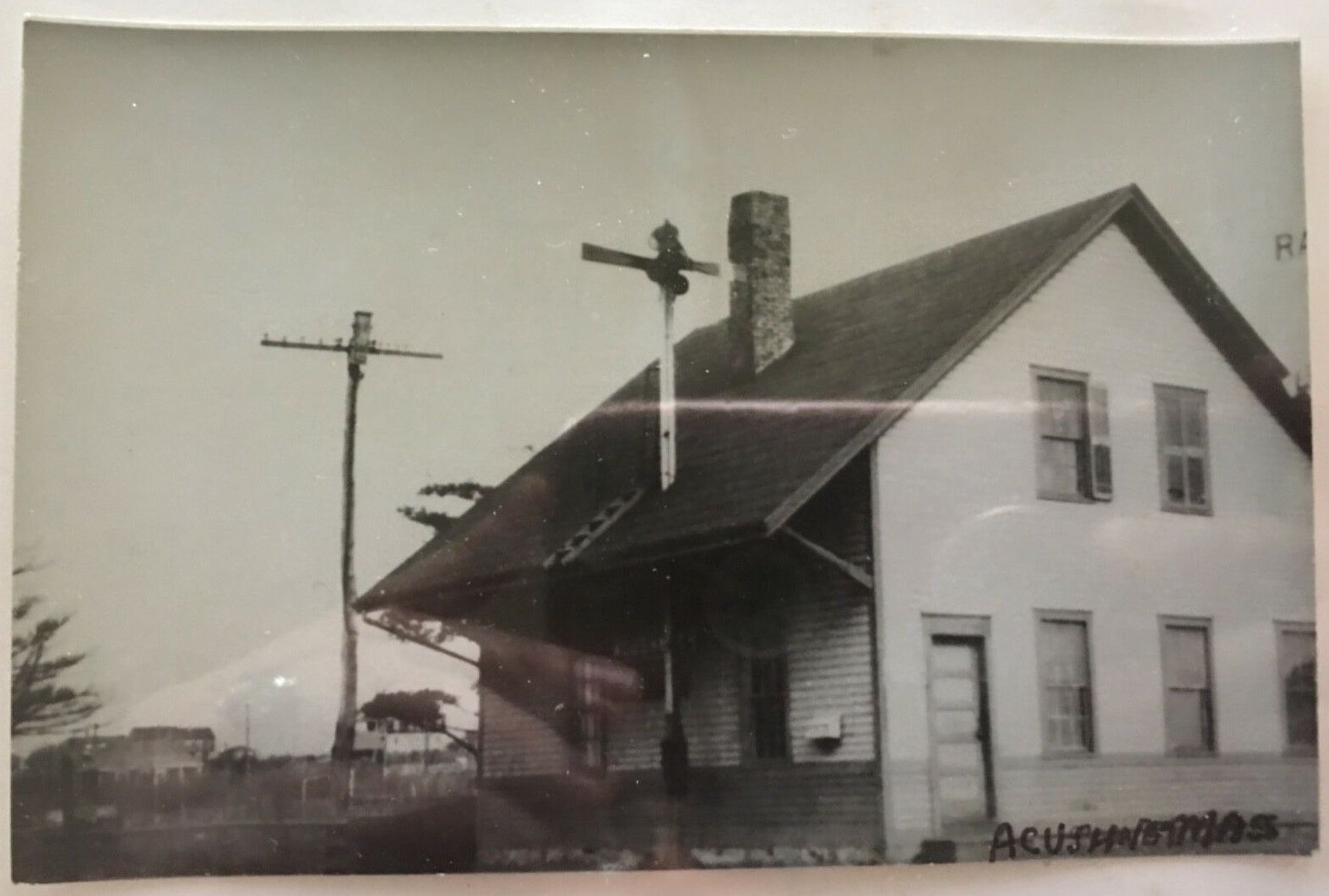
A postcard of Acushnet station

The New Bedford and Taunton Railroad opened between its namesake cities in July 1840, completing a rail route between Boston and New Bedford. Acushnet station, located at Tarkiln Hill Road north of downtown New Bedford, served the eponymous town to the east. The station was located on the east side of the tracks on the north side of the street, with a freight house on the west side of the tracks. Service was later consolidated under the New Bedford Railroad (1873), Boston, Clinton, Fitchburg and New Bedford Railroad (1876), Old Colony Railroad (1879), and finally the New Haven Railroad (1893).

Passenger service on the line continued until September 5, 1958. However, most local stops including Acushnet were discontinued by the 1930s; by the end of service, trains ran nonstop from New Bedford to Taunton. The line continued to be used for freight service by the New Haven and its successors Penn Central and Conrail, then finally as the CSX New Bedford Subdivision. The former station building, moved northeast to Church Street, has been reused as a private residence.

=== South Coast Rail ===
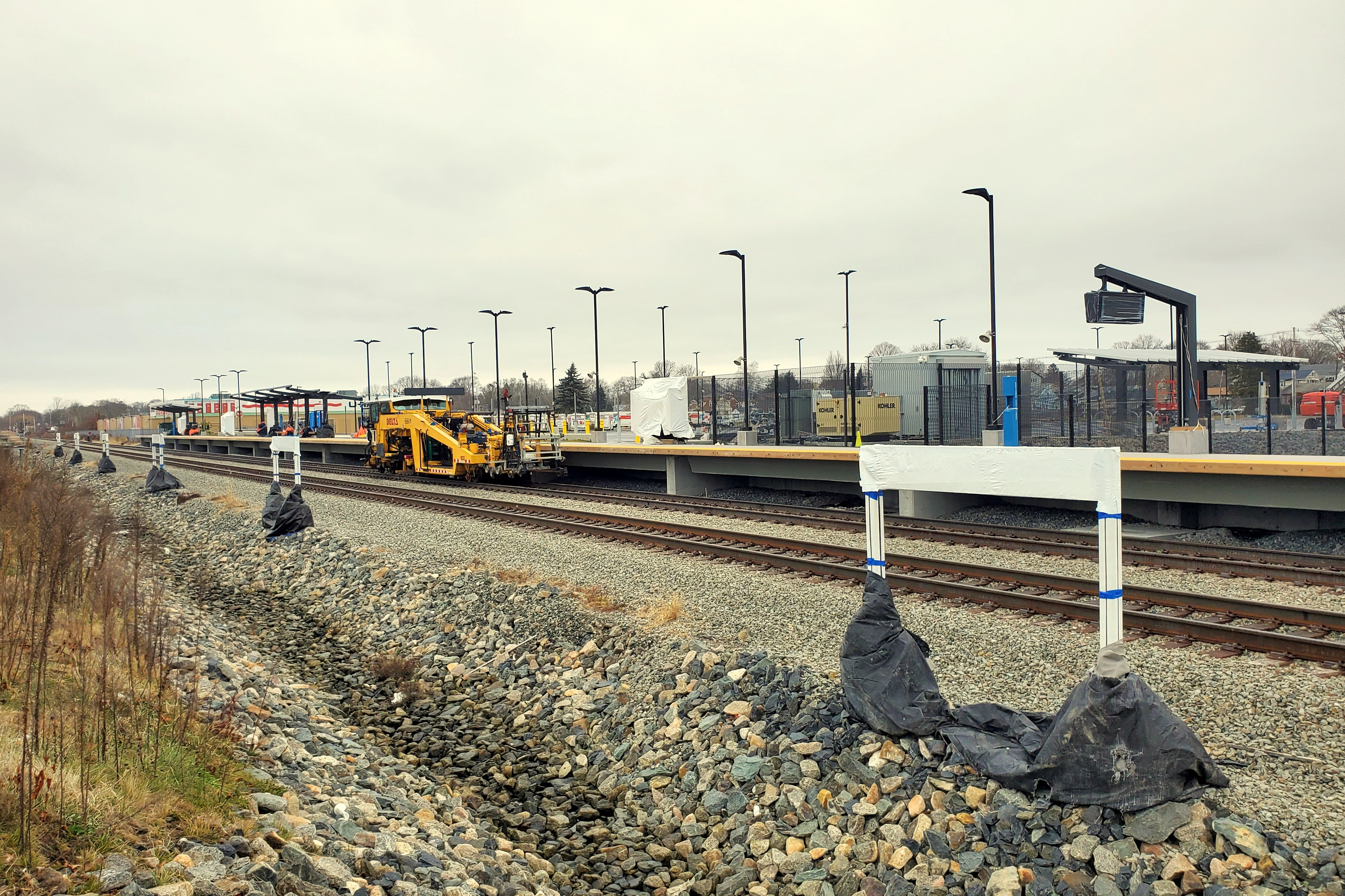
Church Street station near completion in December 2023

In September 2008, MassDOT released 18 potential station sites for South Coast Rail, including a King's Highway station in New Bedford (at or near the former Acushnet station site). A 2009 corridor plan called for the station to be located south of Kings Highway/Tarkiln Hill Road, with the existing strip mall and industrial sites around the station area replaced by mixed-use transit-oriented development. On June 11, 2010, the state took ownership of the New Bedford Subdivision and several other CSX lines as part of a sale agreement. By 2013, plans called for the station to be on the west side of the tracks at the site, sharing parking with an existing movie theater.

In 2017, the project was re-evaluated due to cost issues. A new proposal released in March 2017 called for early service via Middleborough by 2024, followed by full service via Stoughton by 2029. The new proposal called for King's Highway station to be part of the first phase. In 2019, the planned site was moved across the tracks due to drainage and land acquisition issues, with the name changed to "North New Bedford" for clarity. A footbridge may be later constructed to provide access from the west side of the tracks, as 40% of the expected ridership is from the west. In 2020, the planned name was changed to "Church Street".

A former industrial building at 387 Church Street was demolished in 2020 to make room for the station and its parking lot. The MBTA awarded a $403.5-million contract for the Middleborough Secondary and New Bedford Secondary portions of the project, including Church Street station, on August 24, 2020; construction was expected to begin later in 2020 and take 37 months. The line was expected to open in late 2023. The station was 16% complete by February 2022, with 46% of platform foundations complete. The contract was 53% complete by August 2022. In the November 2022 election, New Bedford voted to join the MBTA funding district, a prerequisite for service.

Opening was delayed to mid-2024 in September 2023; at that point, the station was 86% complete and expected to be finished by the end of the year. In June 2024, the opening of the project was delayed to May 2025. Church Street station was complete by that time. Service began on March 24, 2025. Church Street station was planned to be served by Southeastern Regional Transit Authority bus service; however, the agency ultimately did not reroute any service to the station.
