= New Bedford station =

Railway station in New Bedford, Massachusetts, US

New Bedford
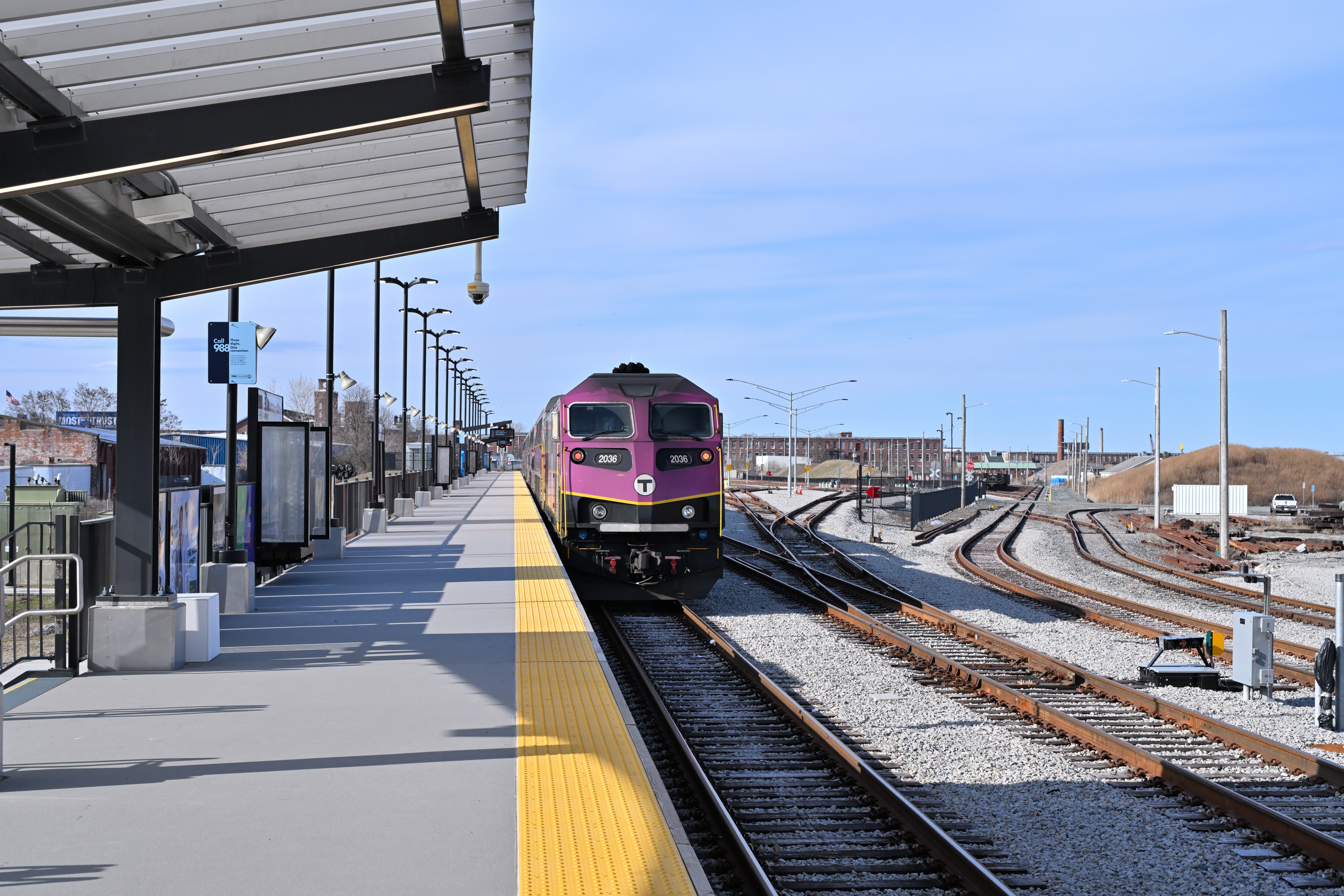
- An inbound train departing the station in March 2025

General information
- Location: 536 Acushnet Avenue; New Bedford, Massachusetts
- Coordinates: 41°38′36.23″N 70°55′31.33″W
- Line: New Bedford Main Line
- Platforms: 1 side platform
- Tracks: 2
- Connections: SRTA: 202, 204, 211

Construction
- Parking: 150 spaces
- Cycle facilities: 8 spaces
- Accessible: Yes

Other information
- Fare zone: 8

History
- Opened: March 24, 2025
- Closed: September 5, 1958
- Rebuilt: June 21, 1886
- Former names: Whale's Tooth (during planning)

Passengers
- 2030: 480 weekday boardings (projected)

Services
Preceding station	MBTA	Following station
Church Street toward South Station	Fall River/New Bedford Line	Terminus
Former services
Preceding station	New York, New Haven and Hartford Railroad	Following station
Weld Street toward Boston	Boston–New Bedford	Terminus
Weld Street toward Boston	Boston–New Bedford	New Bedford Wharf Terminus
Mount Pleasant toward Watuppa	Watuppa Branch	Terminus
Location

New Bedford station is an MBTA Commuter Rail station in New Bedford, Massachusetts. It opened on March 24, 2025, as part of the first phase of the South Coast Rail project. It is the southern terminal of the New Bedford Branch of the Fall River/New Bedford Line. The station has a single side platform on the west side of the New Bedford Main Line, along with a park and ride lot. An adjacent footbridge crosses over Route 18.

The New Bedford and Taunton Railroad opened between its namesake cities in July 1840 with an Egyptian Revival station designed by Russell Warren in downtown New Bedford. After several mergers, the line became part of the Old Colony Railroad in 1879 and the New York, New Haven and Hartford Railroad in 1893. A new Romanesque station was built in 1886. Passenger service ended in 1958. After over a decade of planning, construction of the modern station began in 2020.

== Station design ==
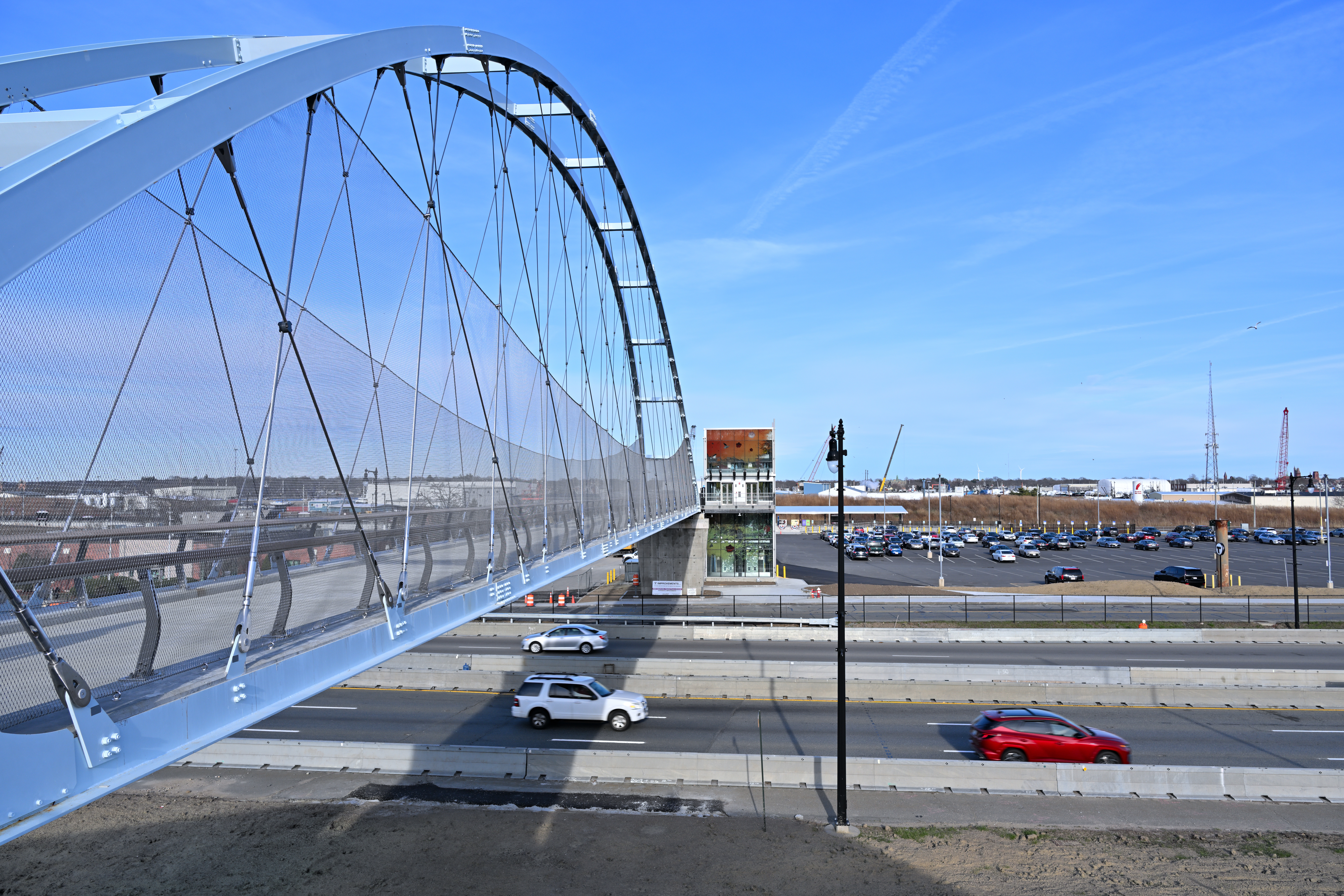
The footbridge over Route 18

The station is located about 0.7 miles (1.1 km) north of downtown New Bedford on the east side of the Route 18 expressway and Acushnet Avenue. It has an 800-foot (240 m)-long accessible high-level side platform on the east side of the New Bedford Subdivision, which runs north–south through the station. The line has one track plus a freight siding at the station location. A 167-foot (51 m)-long canopy covers part of the platform to provide shelter for passengers. The parking lot between the platform and Acushnet Avenue has 352 parking spaces, 22 bicycle spaces, and a kiss-and-ride area. A footbridge over Route 18 and Acushnet Avenue connects the northwest corner of the parking lot to Purchase Street. The 250-foot (76 m)-long bridge has a tied arch main span and two elevators at the east end. The Wamsutta Layover is located just north of the station. At 60 miles (97 km) from Boston, New Bedford is the second-most-distant station in the system after Wickford Junction.

== History ==
=== Former service ===
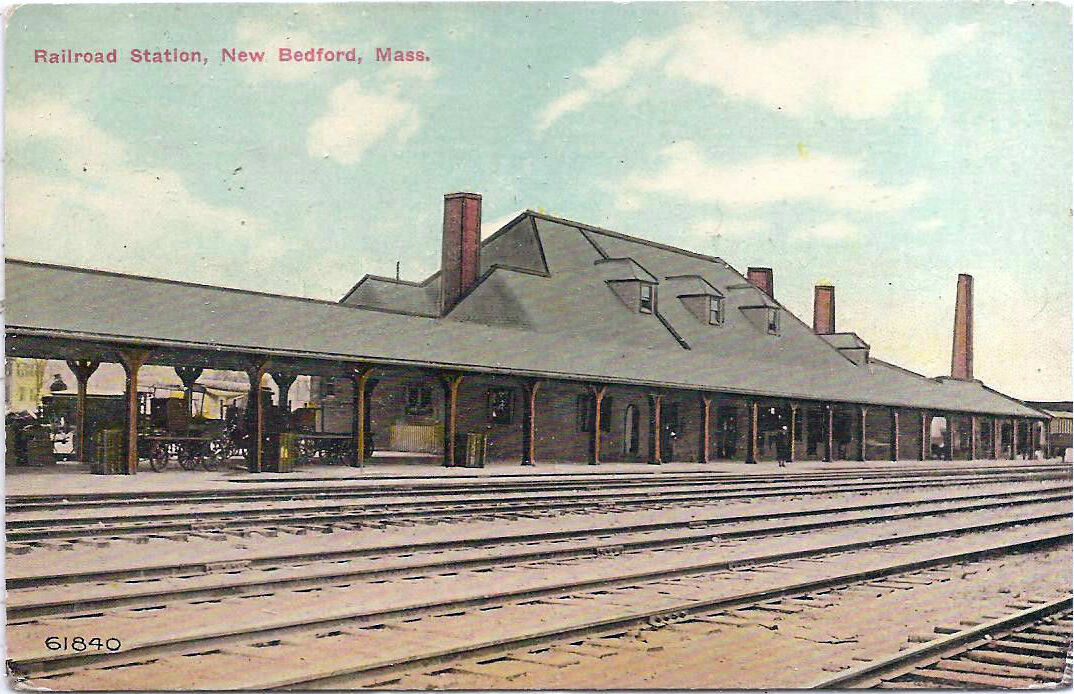
Early-20th-century postcard of the station

The New Bedford and Taunton Railroad opened between its namesake cities in July 1840. An Egyptian Revival station designed by Russell Warren was located at Pearl Street in downtown New Bedford. A short extension to New Bedford Wharf to serve New York steamships opened in July 1873; the Pearl Street station remained the main station for the city. The Fall River Railroad (Watuppa Branch) opened from Fall River to Mount Pleasant Junction north of downtown Fall River in December 1875.

Service was consolidated under the New Bedford Railroad (1874), Boston, Clinton, Fitchburg and New Bedford Railroad (1876), Old Colony Railroad (1879), and finally the New Haven Railroad (1893). Schedules allowing commuting from New Bedford to Boston were not introduced until 1885. The Old Colony opened a new station, slightly to the east of the Pearl Street station, on June 21, 1886. Designed by Henry Paston Clark, it was a Romanesque stone structure.

Grade crossings in New Bedford were eliminated around 1908. Watuppa Branch service was out-competed by electric streetcars in the 1890s; the final passenger service (a single daily mixed train) ended in 1918. Passenger service to New Bedford Wharf slowly declined, and was discontinued entirely by the mid-1950s. All passenger service between New Bedford and Boston ended on September 5, 1958.

=== South Coast Rail ===
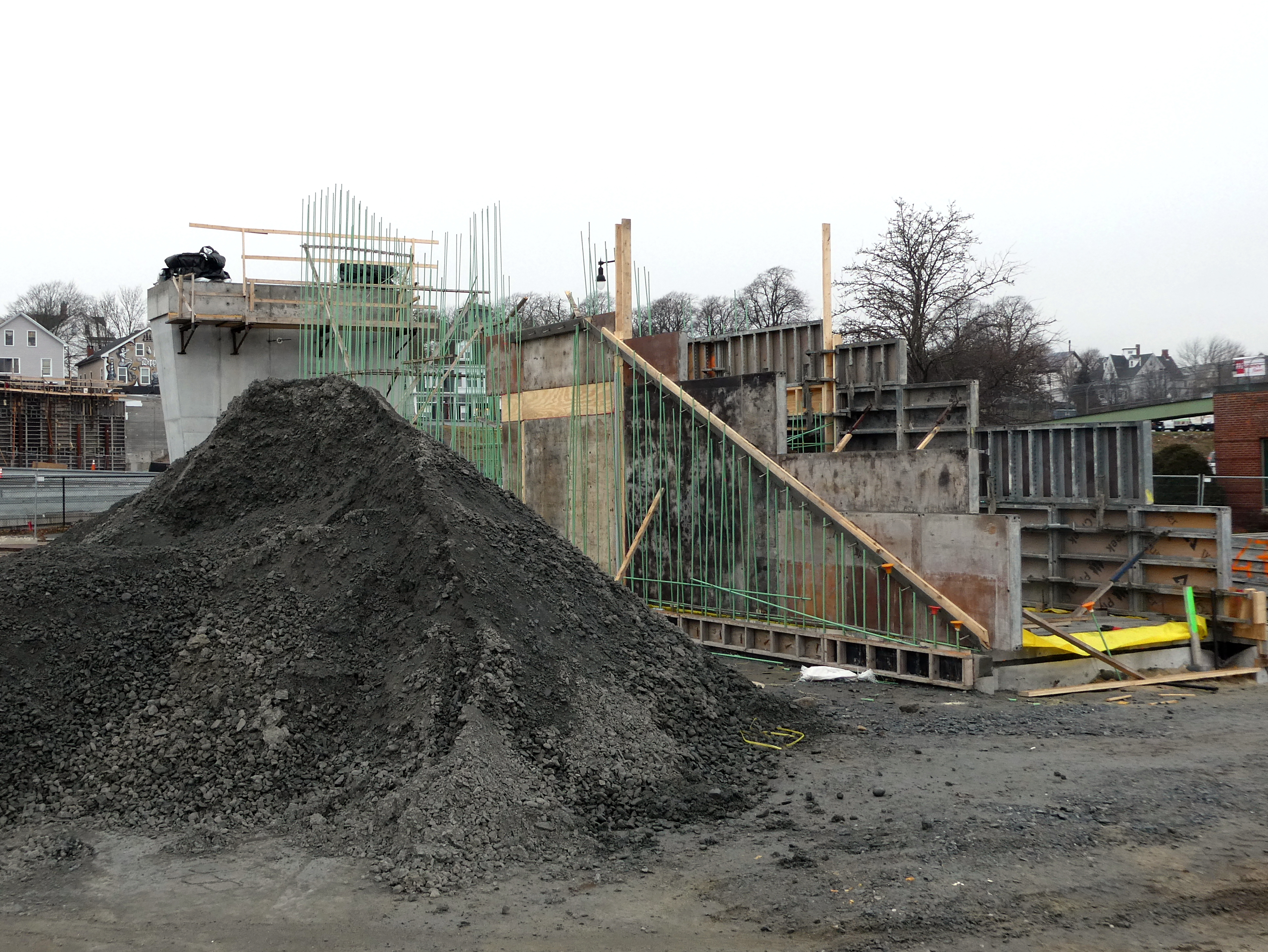
The footbridge under construction in 2023

In September 2008, MassDOT released 18 potential station sites for the South Coast Rail project, including two in downtown New Bedford: Whale's Tooth (the name of a ferry parking lot) at the former station location, and State Pier at State Pier Maritime Terminal (the former steamship wharf). Only the Whale's Tooth site was selected for inclusion; a 2010 conceptual design called for a single side platform serving a single track, with a station building and bus plaza at the north end of the parking lot. The existing footbridge over Route 18 at Pearl Street would be rebuilt. A 2009 corridor plan called for mixed-use transit-oriented development along Route 18 around the new station.

On June 11, 2010, the state took ownership of the New Bedford Subdivision and several other CSX lines as part of a sale agreement. Plans released as part of the Final Environmental Impact Report in 2013 placed the Wamsutta layover yard just north of the station, with a second track serving as yard access and a freight passing track. The station building and bus plaza were removed from the design; the existing footbridge would be reused.

In 2017, the project was re-evaluated due to cost issues. A new proposal released in March 2017 called for early service via Middleborough by 2024, followed by full service via Stoughton by 2029. In 2019, the planned station name was changed from Whale's Tooth to New Bedford for clarity. By then, a new footbridge at Willis Street (a block south of the existing bridge) was added to the design. It was to have two truss spans, with a ramp from the bridge to the station.

The MBTA awarded a $403.5 million contract for the Middleborough Secondary and New Bedford Secondary portions of the project, including New Bedford station, on August 24, 2020; construction was expected to begin later in 2020 and take 37 months. The line was expected to open in late 2023. The contract was 18% complete by November 2021, with New Bedford station construction just beginning, and 53% complete by August 2022. A $21.3 million contract for the new footbridge was awarded in December 2022. Its design had been changed to have a single tied arch span.

Bridge construction began in May 2023. Opening of South Coast Rail was delayed to mid-2024 in September 2023; at that point, the station was 94% complete and expected to be finished by the end of the year. Installation of the span of the new footbridge began in February 2024, with completion of the bridge expected by the end of 2024. In June 2024, the opening of the project was delayed to May 2025. New Bedford station was 97% complete by that time and expected to be complete in July.

In November 2024, the state legislature passed a bill naming the bridge as the "Andre Lopes Korean War Veteran Overpass". Lopes died in 1956 from injuries sustained during the war. The elevator shaft of the bridge will have artwork entitled "Equinox" by Tracy Silva Barbosa. By December 2024, the bridge was 75% complete. The footbridge was 85% complete by February 2025 and expected to open along with the station. The old footbridge was to be demolished in the spring. Rail service began on March 24, 2025.
