= Greater Attleboro Taunton Regional Transit Authority =

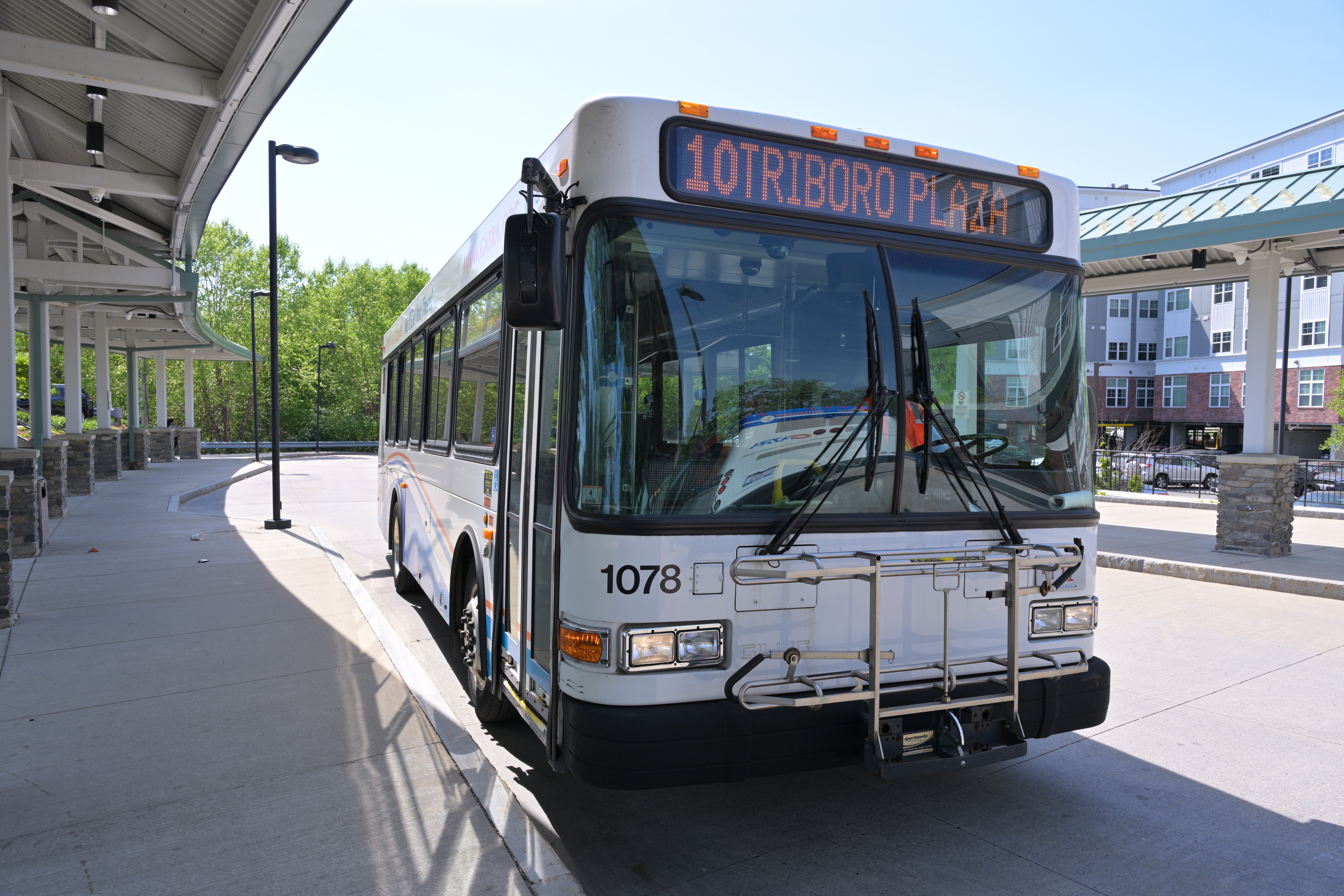
- A GATRA route 10 bus at Attleboro station
- Headquarters: 10 Oak Street, Taunton, Massachusetts
- Service type: bus service, paratransit
- Routes: 19
- Administrator: Mary Ellen DeFrias
- Website: gatra.org

The Greater Attleboro Taunton Regional Transit Authority (GATRA) oversees and coordinates public and medical transportation in the areas of Attleboro and Taunton, Massachusetts and 28 nearby areas. It operates daily (except on Sundays) fixed bus routes, commuter shuttle services and Dial-A-Ride services for seniors and persons with disabilities within communities in Bristol, Norfolk, and Plymouth counties. GATRA is based at the Bloom Bus Terminal in Taunton.

As of 2024, the member municipalities are Attleboro, Bellingham, Berkley, Carver, Dighton, Duxbury, Foxborough, Franklin, Halifax, Hanover, Kingston, Lakeville, Marshfield, Mansfield, Medway, Middleborough, Norfolk, North Attleborough, Norton, Pembroke, Plainville, Plymouth, Plympton, Raynham, Rehoboth, Scituate, Seekonk, Taunton, Wareham and Wrentham.

GATRA's territory overlaps with the Southeastern Massachusetts and Old Colony MPOs.

== Services ==
=== Taunton ===
- 2 Broadway/Market Basket
- 4 Weir/Westside
- 5 Walmart/E. Taunton/Target
- 6 Whittenton
- 7 School St./Raynham
- 8 County St./Target

=== Attleboro ===
- 10 Attleboro/N. Attleborough
- 11 S. Attleboro Connector
- 12 S. Attleboro/Attleboro
- 14 North Attleborough/Plainville
- 15 Sturdy Hospital/La Salette
- 16 Seekonk/Attleboro

=== Regional ===
- 18 Attleboro/Norton/Taunton
- Gateway Link - Fall River/Taunton/Brockton
- Downtown Middleborough Shuttle
- Medway T-Shuttle

=== Plymouth ===
- Mayflower Link
- Freedom Link
- Liberty Link
- Manomet Link
- SAIL (Seaside Area Inter-Link) Marshfield-Duxbury-Kingston

=== Wareham ===
- Link 1 Cromesett/Onset
- Link 2 Buzzards Bay
- Link 4 West Wareham
- Wareham-Plymouth Connection
- Wareham-New Bedford Connection (sponsored by GATRA; operated by SRTA)

=== GATRA GO (Microtransit) ===
- GATRA GO United (Foxborough, Franklin, Mansfield, Norfolk, Norton, & Wrentham)
- GATRA GO Seacoast (Scituate)
- GATRA GO Explore (Pembroke)
- GATRA Go Coastline (South Plymouth)

== See also ==
- Brockton Area Transit Authority, also serving the same counties of Bristol, Norfolk, and Plymouth.
- Southeastern Regional Transit Authority, serving the counties of Bristol and Plymouth.
