= Southeastern Regional Transit Authority =

Public transport authority

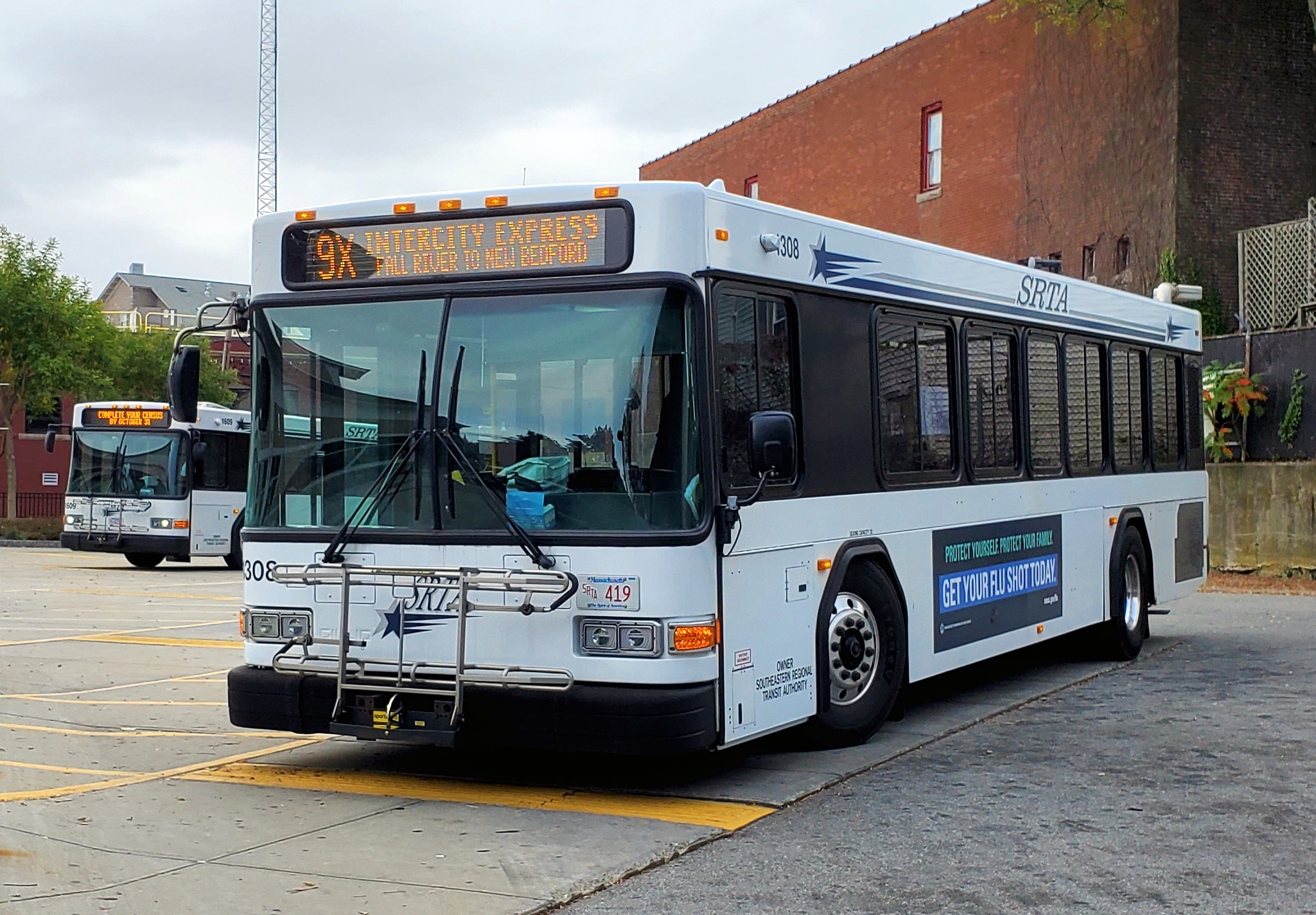
- SRTA route 9X bus at the Fall River bus terminal in 2020
- Founded: 1974
- Headquarters: 700 Pleasant Street, New Bedford, Massachusetts
- Service area: Bristol County and Plymouth County, Massachusetts
- Service type: bus service, paratransit
- Routes: 25
- Stations: 2 (Bus terminals)
- Fleet: Gillig Standard Low Floor (29', 35' and 40'), Low Floor 35' Hybrids, Ford Paratransit Vans (E-350), Dodge Paratransit Vans
- Annual ridership: 2,236,844 (Year End Total as of Fiscal Year 2020)
- Fuel type: Diesel, Diesel/Electric Hybrid, Gasoline
- Administrator: Erik B. Rousseau
- Website: www.srtabus.com

Southeastern Regional Transit Authority (SRTA) is a public transport authority in Bristol County and Plymouth County, Massachusetts. It serves 10 municipalities in Massachusetts' South Coast region: Acushnet, Dartmouth, Fairhaven, Fall River, Freetown, Mattapoisett, New Bedford, Somerset, Swansea, and Westport. Fixed-route bus services are offered to serve the cities of Fall River and New Bedford.

== Funding sources ==
SRTA gets funding from a number of sources, including federal, state, local and farebox revenue. As of Fiscal Year 2019, the majority of SRTA's funding came from the federal government, after that being state, local and farebox revenue.

== Routes ==
SRTA operates 22 bus routes: ten Fall River local routes, ten New Bedford local routes, and two regional routes. After a route renumbering that took place on August 28, 2023, Fall River local routes are numbered in the 100s and New Bedford local routes in the 200s. The SRTA also operates three MicroConnector microtransit services which connect with the MBTA Commuter Rail Fall River/New Bedford Line.

=== Fall River Routes ===
- 101: South Main
- 102: North Main
- 103: Laurel Street
- 104: Robeson Street
- 105: Stafford Road
- 107: Bay Street
- 108: BCC
- 109: Bedford Street
- 110: Rodman Street
- 114: Swansea

=== New Bedford Routes ===
- 201: Fort Rodman
- 202: Lund's Corner
- 203: Dartmouth Street
- 204: Ashley Boulevard
- 205: South Central
- 206: Shawmut Avenue
- 208: Mt. Pleasant Street
- 210: Dartmouth Mall
- 211: Fairhaven
- 221: North End Shuttle

=== Regional Routes ===
- 9: Fall River-New Bedford Intercity
- Wareham–New Bedford Connection (operated by SRTA; sponsored by GATRA

=== MicroConnector ===
- New Bedford North (connections with MBTA Commuter Rail at Church Street Station)
- New Bedford South (connections with MBTA Commuter Rail at New Bedford Station)
- Fall River (connections with MBTA Commuter Rail at Fall River Station)
