= Myricks, Massachusetts =

Place in Bristol County, Massachusetts, U.S.

Coordinates: 41°49′50″N 71°01′38″W

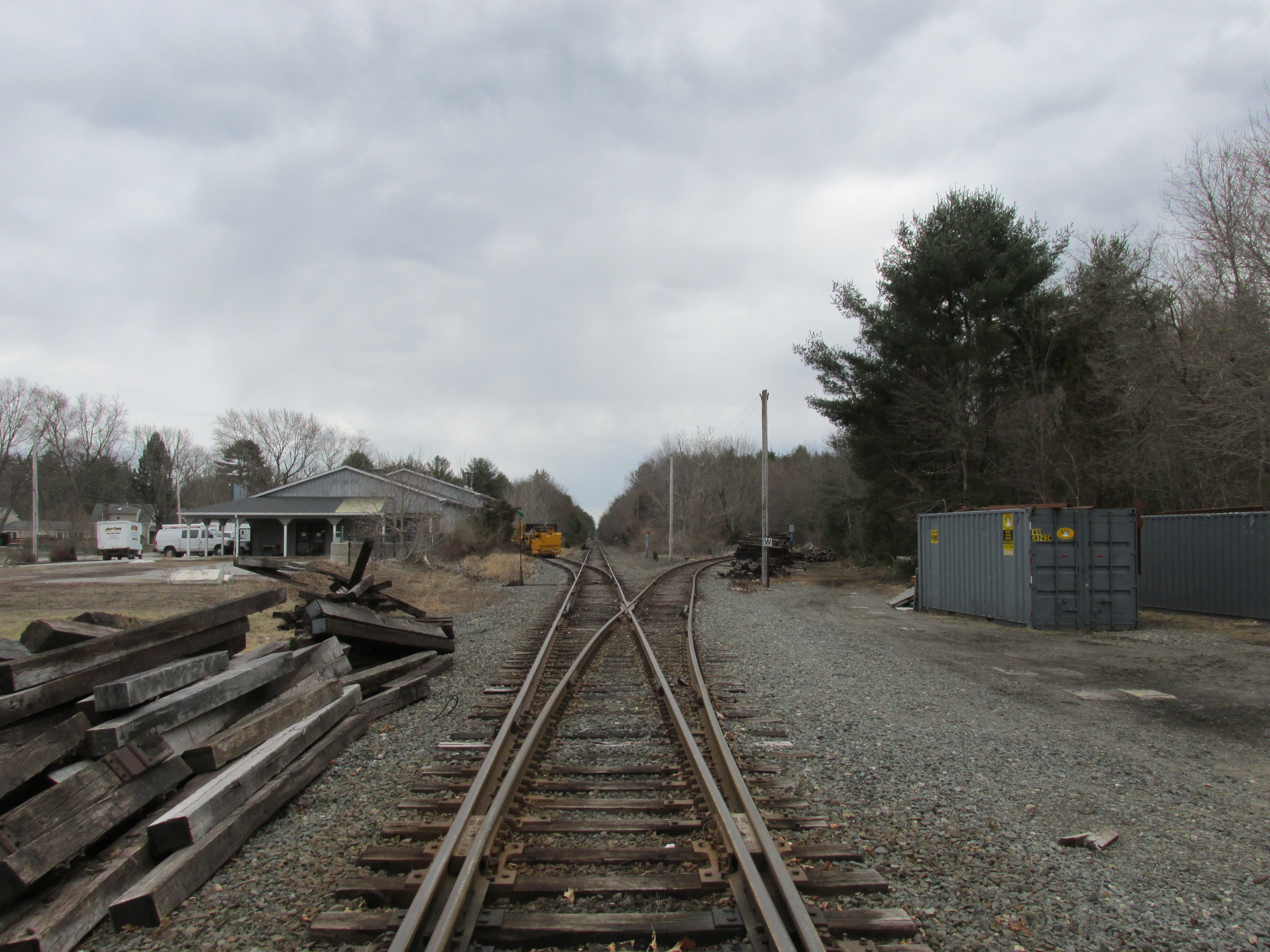
Railroad junction

Myricks is an association community or populated place (Class Code U6) located in Berkley, Bristol County, Massachusetts, United States. The elevation is 62 feet. Myricks appears on the Assonet U.S. Geological Survey Map.

It is also the junction of the railroad from Fall River, New Bedford, and Boston on the Fall River Railroad (1846) (later the Old Colony Railroad).

The Myricks railway station was a popular stop for vacationers. This stop on the line no longer exists. Near the location of this stop was the Cattle and Agricultural Show that ran for some years towards the end of the 19th century. The buildings were later sold and is now unsettled land off Mill Street.
