= Canton station =

Canton station may refer to:

- Canton station (Illinois)
- Canton station (Minnesota)
- Canton station (Ohio)
- Canton Center station, Massachusetts
- Canton Junction station, Massachusetts
