= Springdale station (Massachusetts) =

Springdale
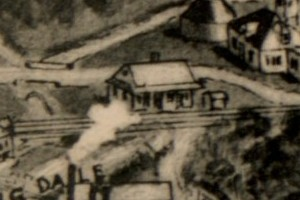
- 1918 drawing of Springdale station

General information
- Coordinates: 42.148046°N 71.129031°W
- Line: Stoughton Branch

History
- Opened: October 1891
- Closed: July 1, 1940

Former lines
Preceding station	New York, New Haven and Hartford Railroad	Following station
West Stoughton toward Taunton	Stoughton Branch	Canton toward Canton Junction
Location

Springdale station was a New York, New Haven and Hartford Railroad station in the village of Springdale in Canton, Massachusetts. It was located on the Stoughton Branch.

The station was built by the Old Colony Railroad at a cost $1,200. It opened in October 1891. It replaced an older building built in 1855. In 1919 the building was used in the filming of the now-lost silent film Anne of Green Gables, starring Mary Miles Minter.

By the 1920s improvements in local highways led to reduced service on the Stoughton Branch, with both Springdale and West Stoughton in danger of being closed. They and other low-traffic stations were further endangered by the New Haven's 1935 bankruptcy. By the late 1930s service at Springdale was done to four weekday trains per day, handling a total of eleven passengers. The station was closed and demolished on July 1, 1940.
