= Route 128 station =

Rail station in Westwood, Massachusetts, US

Route 128
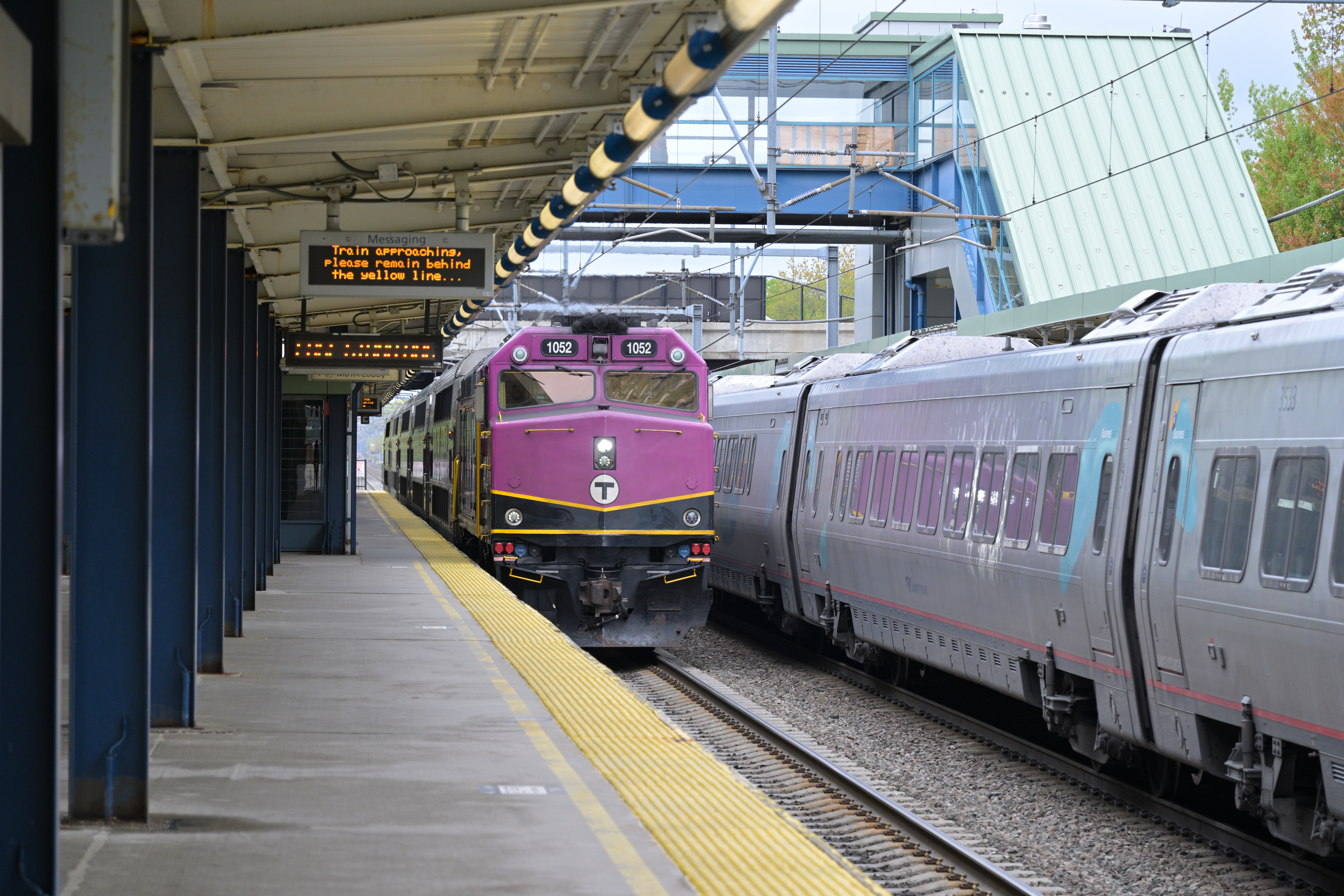
- An outbound MBTA Providence Line train entering Route 128 station, with an Acela on the Boston-bound track

General information
- Location: 50 University Avenue; Westwood, Massachusetts; United States
- Coordinates: 42.2102°N 71.1472°W
- Owner: Amtrak (station and platforms); MBTA (parking garage and tracks)
- Line: Attleboro Line (Northeast Corridor)
- Platforms: 2 side platforms
- Tracks: 2

Construction
- Parking: 2,578 spaces; paid
- Accessible: Yes

Other information
- Station code: Amtrak: RTE
- IATA code: ZRU
- Fare zone: 2 (MBTA)

History
- Opened: April 26, 1953
- Rebuilt: 1965, 1998–2000

Passengers
- 2024: 1,016 daily boardings (MBTA)
- FY 2025: 568,300 annual (Amtrak)

Services
Preceding station	Amtrak	Following station
Providence toward Washington, D.C.	Acela	Boston Back Bay toward Boston South
Providence toward Norfolk, Newport News or Roanoke	Northeast Regional	Boston Back Bay toward Boston South
Preceding station	MBTA	Following station
Canton Junction toward Wickford Junction or Stoughton	Providence/Stoughton Line	Readville toward South Station
Former services
Preceding station	MBTA	Following station
Canton Junction toward Foxboro	Foxboro event service 1989–1994	Back Bay toward South Station
Preceding station	Amtrak	Following station
Providence–Union Station toward New Haven	Beacon Hill 1978-1981	Boston South 1979–1981 Terminus
Providence–Union Station toward New Haven	Beacon Hill 1978-1981	Boston Back Bay toward Boston South
Providence–Union Station toward Washington, D.C.	Northeast Corridor	Boston Back Bay toward Boston South
Preceding station	New York, New Haven and Hartford Railroad	Following station
Canton Junction toward New Haven	Shore Line	Readville toward Boston
Proposed services
Preceding station	MBTA	Following station
Canton Junction toward Battleship Cove or New Bedford	South Coast Rail Phase 2 (2030)	Readville toward South Station
Track layout
Location

Route 128 station (sometimes titled Route 128/University Park) is a passenger rail station located at the crossing of the Northeast Corridor and Interstate 95/US Route 1/Route 128 at the eastern tip of Dedham and Westwood, Massachusetts, United States. The station is shared by Amtrak and the Massachusetts Bay Transportation Authority (MBTA). It is served by most MBTA Commuter Rail Providence/Stoughton Line trains, as well as by all Amtrak Northeast Regional and Acela intercity trains. The station building, platforms, and parking garage are all fully accessible.

The Boston and Providence Railroad and its successors Old Colony Railroad and New Haven Railroad served Green Lodge station, at the modern station site, from the 1850s to the 1920s. In 1953, the New Haven opened Route 128 station as a park and ride station adjacent to the Route 128 expressway. The original station buildings were replaced in 1965. Amtrak took over intercity service in 1971; the MBTA began subsidizing commuter service in 1973. The two agencies rebuilt the station from 1998 to 2000 with high-level platforms, a postmodern station building, and a four-story parking garage. The station attracted nearby transit-oriented development, but has suffered from unreliable escalators and elevators.

== Station design ==
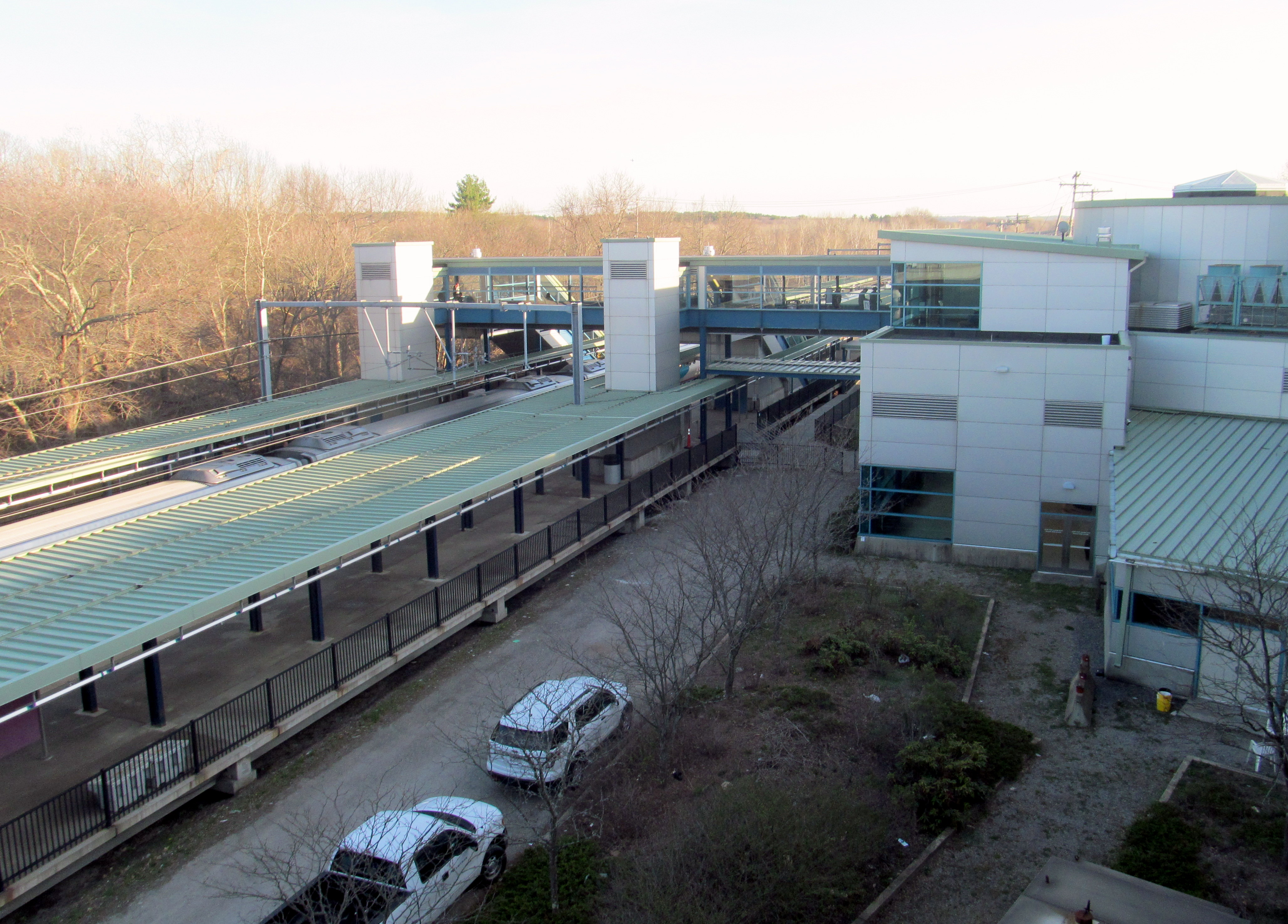
Platforms, footbridge, and station building viewed from the garage roof

Route 128 station is located just south of the Route 128/I-95 beltway near the tripoint of Canton, Dedham, and Westwood, about 11 miles (18 km) south of downtown Boston. The station has two 1,050-foot (320 m)-long side platforms (the standard Amtrak length) serving the two tracks of the Northeast Corridor. The platforms are connected by a glass-walled footbridge, which connects to the upper level of the three-story station building on the west side of the tracks. An Amtrak waiting room is located on the first floor; ticketing is on the third floor. The second floor is reserved for maintenance purposes. The building is a postmodern design "composed of intersecting volumes", with metal and glass walls.

West of the station is a four-story parking garage with 2,578 spaces. About 550 spaces are reserved for Amtrak (with overnight parking allowed), with an entrance from Blue Hill Drive. The remaining spaces are for daily MBTA parking, with an entrance from University Avenue. Amtrak spaces are on the ground floor for convenient access to the waiting room and the southbound platform; MBTA spaces are on the upper levels for access to the footbridge to the northbound platform. Unlike most MBTA stations, credit cards and even E-ZPass transponders are accepted for payment of parking fees. The station area and platforms are owned by Amtrak, but the MBTA owns the parking garage and tracks.

== History ==
=== Green Lodge station ===
The Boston and Providence Railroad (B&P) was extended south from Dedham Lodge to Canton on September 12, 1834. The B&P opened Green Lodge station, located at the crossing of the eponymous street near the modern station location, by 1857. The B&P was leased by the Old Colony Railroad in 1888, and in turn by the New York, New Haven and Hartford Railroad in 1893; Green Lodge station was closed in the mid-1920s. The grade crossing was replaced with a road bridge around 1932 as part of the construction of the original Circumferential Highway. A Westwood woman, Marie Spokesfield, was struck by a train below the bridge on September 21, 1934. Her husband, accused of having murdered her and thrown the body from the bridge, was found not guilty by a directed verdict in March 1935.

=== Route 128 station ===
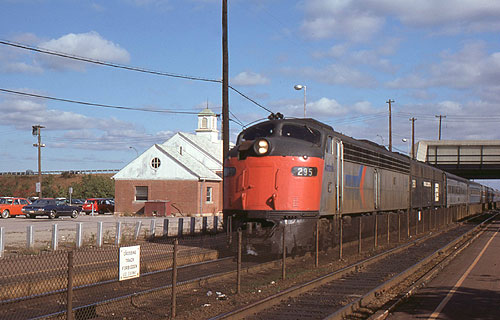
A southbound Amtrak train at Route 128 station in November 1974

The New Haven Railroad opened Route 128 station on April 26, 1953, on the same site as the former Green Lodge station. Intended for intercity passengers driving from the suburbs on the then-under-construction Route 128 expressway, the station had 1,500-foot (460 m)-long platforms to accommodate intercity trains and a 1,200-space parking lot. Two small prefabricated shelters, manufactured as garages, served as waiting rooms. The station was built in one week at a cost of $300,000 (equivalent to $2,800,000 in 2024). Opened at the direction of New Haven president Frederic C. Dumaine, Jr., Route 128 station was among the first dedicated park and ride stations built in the country. It quickly became a preferred station for suburban commuters, who represented a majority of station traffic by the 1980s.

The original station structures were replaced in 1965 with larger brick buildings. The larger structure, located on the west side of the tracks, was similar to Sharon station built three decades earlier. A pedestrian overpass originally from Wickford Junction was added in 1971. The New Haven was merged into Penn Central at the end of 1968. Amtrak took over intercity service on May 1, 1971, with the former B&P becoming the far northern leg of Amtrak's Northeast Corridor mainline. The Massachusetts Bay Transportation Authority (MBTA), formed in 1964 to subsidize suburban commuter service, gradually took over local trains. The MBTA bought Penn Central's southside lines and stations on January 27, 1973, and began subsidizing service as far as Canton Junction on the Stoughton Branch and Sharon on the Providence Line in June 1973. Penn Central continued to operate the southside lines under contract to the MBTA. The contract passed to Conrail when it took over Penn Central on April 1, 1976, then to other contract operators beginning in 1977.

The $1 parking fee at the station was eliminated on April 1, 1983, in an attempt to divert riders from other stations on the Providence/Stoughton and Franklin lines with less parking availability. The bridge that carried Green Lodge Street over the tracks was closed around 1977 and later removed; the abutments still flank the platforms. Plans to rebuild the bridge were delayed in 1992–93 as capital funds were redirected to restoration of the Old Colony Lines. Canton officials, seeking to avoid additional traffic on the residential portion of Green Lodge Street, opposed a new bridge; by 1998, it was no longer planned. From 1989 to 1994, Boston–Foxboro trains for events at Foxboro Stadium operated over the Northeast Corridor, with intermediate stops including Route 128. Boston–Foxboro service was rerouted over the Franklin Line in 1995.

=== Rebuilt station ===
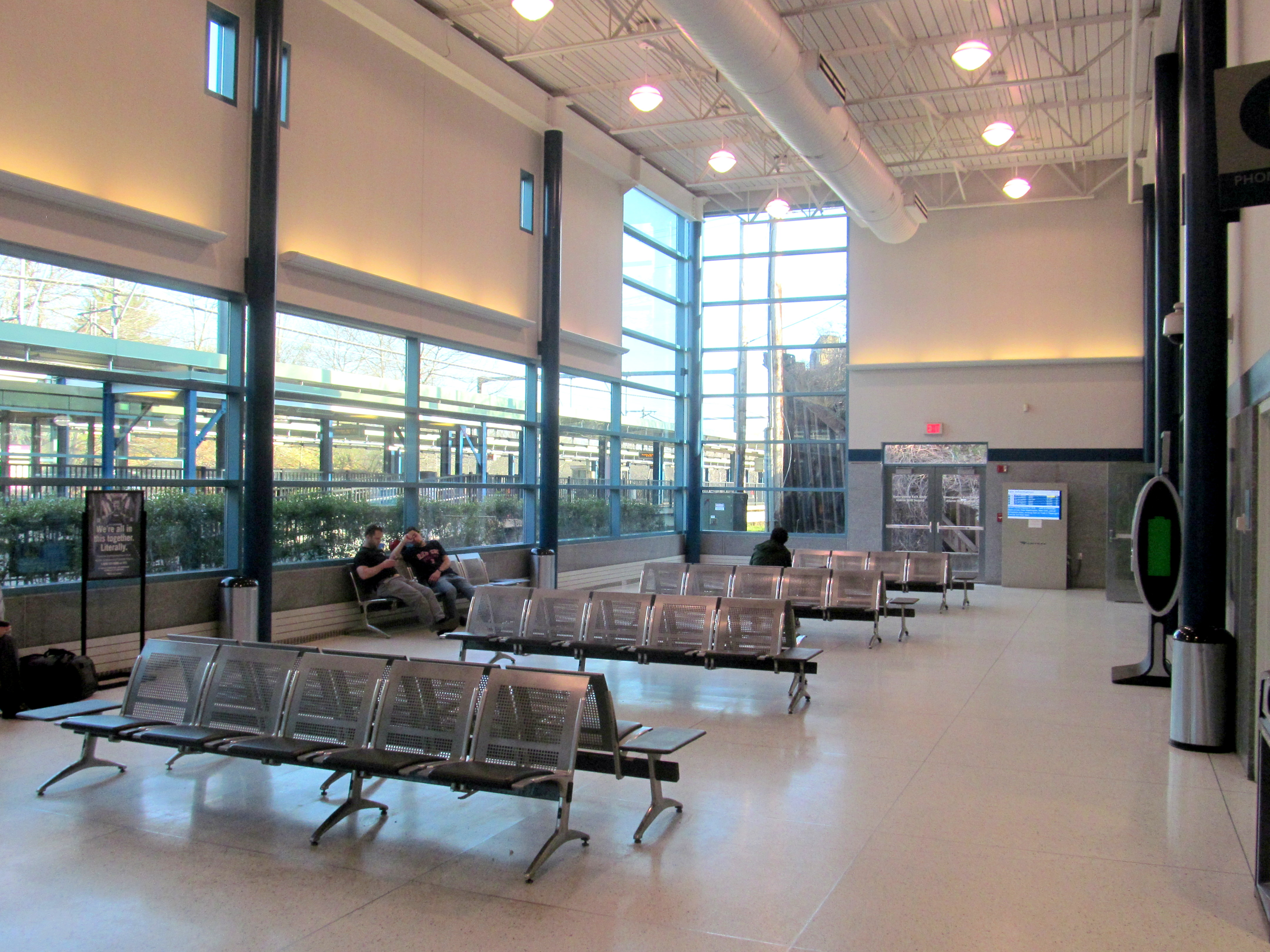
The Amtrak waiting room in 2016

A late 1980s proposal to construct a parking garage and hotel at the station was scrapped due to local opposition. By 1990, plans for the Northend Electrification Project included the construction of accessible high-level platforms at the station. Conceptual designs for a replacement station were completed in June 1991. By 1995, the parking lot frequently reached capacity, forcing riders to park on nearby streets. In November 1997, the MBTA Board approved plans to replace the aging station. The 850-space surface lot (which usually had 100–200 additional vehicles illegally parked around its perimeter) would be replaced by a 2,750-space, four-level parking garage. Amtrak would pay $22.6 million of the $43.2 million cost, with the MBTA funding the remaining $20.6 million.

Construction of the new platforms began in August 1998. That month, construction of the garage was delayed until 1999 because Dedham and Westwood objected to potential runoff from the garage, which could pollute nearby wetlands. The towns insisted on a roof over the parking garage (to prevent rainwater from collecting oil and gasoline spills from the garage), which the MBTA claimed would add $1 million to the cost. The Massachusetts Department of Environmental Protection approved the garage project in December 1998. Station construction began in late 1998, but the garage was further delayed due to continued disputes with the towns. Garage construction ultimately began in May 1999.

The first portion of the garage, with 550 spaces, opened on November 1, 1999. The remainder of the garage, except for the top level, opened on January 18, 2000. The new station building, platforms, and footbridge opened in 2000; the older station buildings were demolished that November. The Amtrak Acela Express service (which could only use high-level platforms) began running in December 2000.

The MBTA began planning for transit-oriented development adjacent to the station by the 1980s. In 2006, two development companies announced plans for a 30-building, 130-acre (53 ha) project called Westwood Station. The project was controversial with local residents due to traffic concerns and the proximity of an exit ramp to existing residences. The project was shelved in 2010 due to the recession, but construction on the renamed University Station project began in 2013. Most construction was completed by 2019; that year, Citizens Bank agreed to construct an office as a major commercial anchor for the project.

==== Parking issues ====
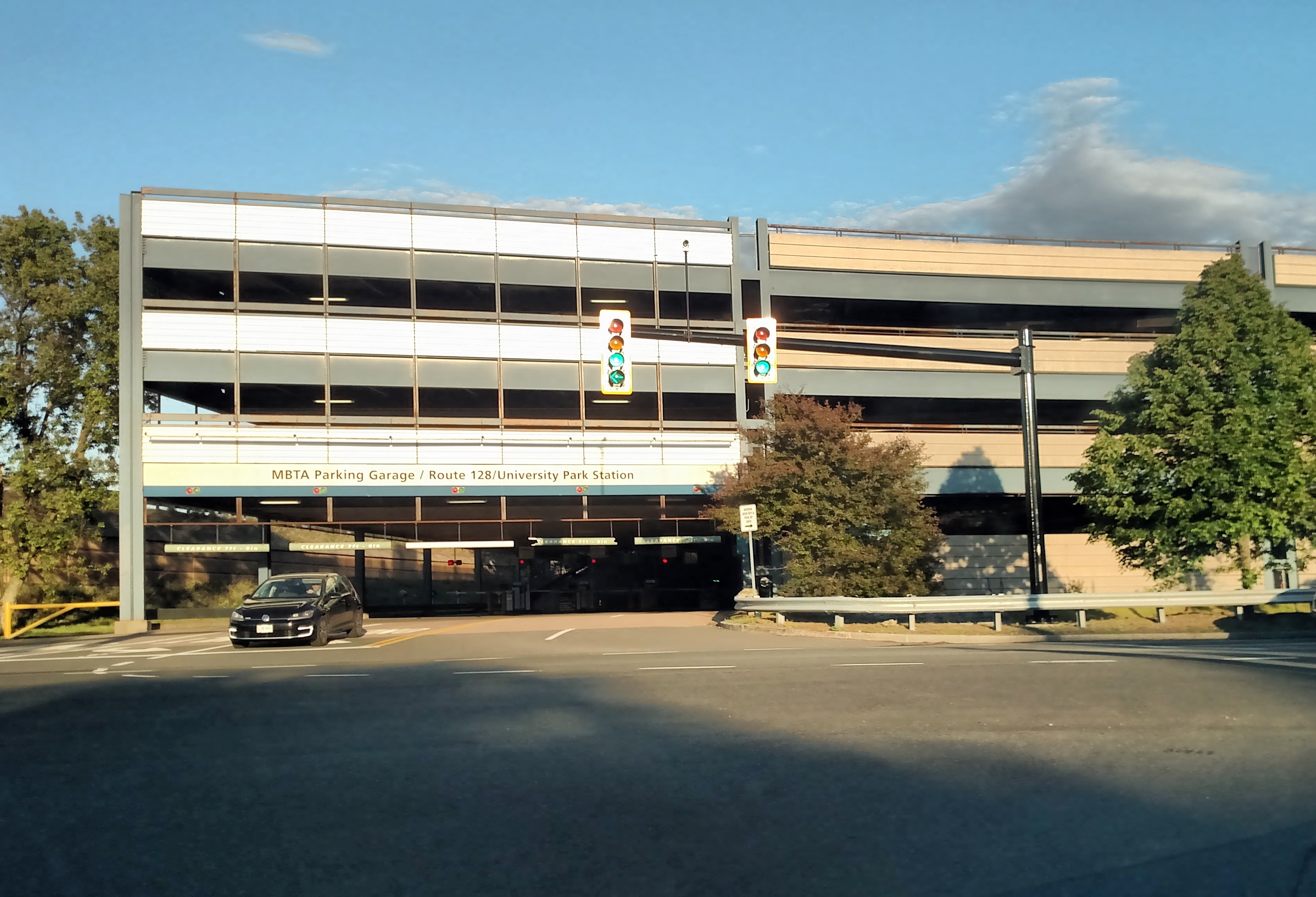
The MBTA entrance to the garage in 2017

The financing plan for the garage controversially relied heavily on customer revenues, which initially failed to meet expectations. This plan caused parking fees to be higher than other MBTA Commuter Rail stations; the daily fee increased from $1 to $3 when the garage opened. By October 2003, only about 1,000 of the garage spaces were used, in part due to the higher fees. In July 2004, the MBTA attempted to sell sponsorship rights for the garage, which is visible from Route 128/I-95. The top floor of the garage was not opened with the rest of the garage in 2000 due to an environmental agreement between the MBTA, Dedham, and Westwood. It opened around 2005 with the completion of a widened ramp from Route 128/I-95 eastbound to I-95 southbound.

Some local commuters continued to park on the east side of the station along Green Lodge Street to avoid parking fees. The MBTA planned to curtail this by shutting off pedestrian access, but abandoned this plan in March 2000 after pressure from Westwood and Dedham officials. The Metropolitan District Commission closed an illegal unpaid dirt lot on the east side of the station in November 2001 due to water pollution concerns, though parking on Green Lodge Street remained. In 2003, Canton began charging for daily parking along Green Lodge Street.

In 2019, Route 128 was the 23rd-busiest Amtrak station in the country and the fifth-busiest in New England. The MBTA issued an $11.1 million contract for repairs to the garage in mid-2021. Notice to proceed was given on July 16, 2021, with completion expected at the end of 2022.

==== Elevator and escalator issues ====
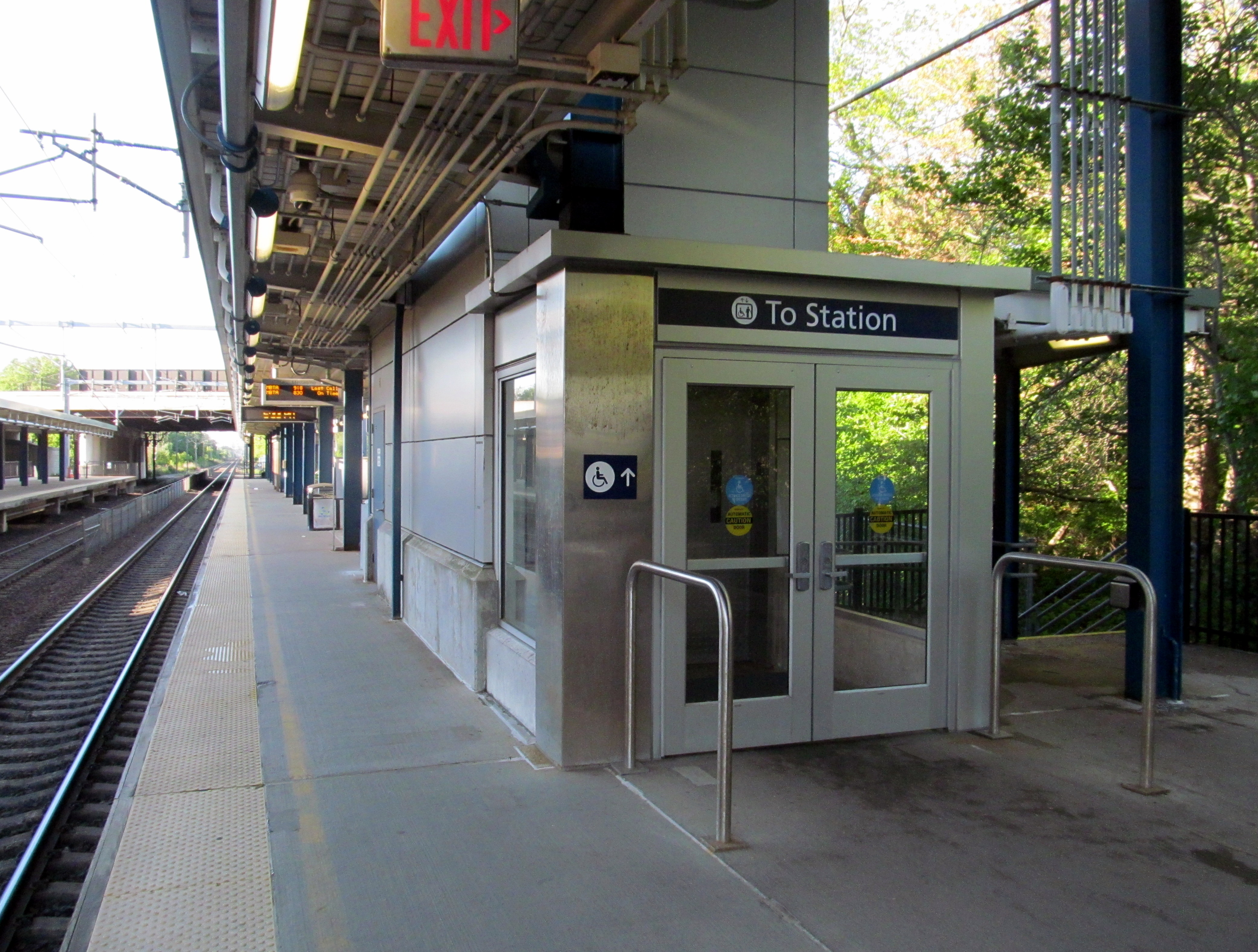
The northbound platform elevator in 2016

The 2000-opened elevators and escalators, which are necessary for many passengers to access the platforms, soon proved unreliable. In early 2013, the escalator serving the southbound platform failed and was not repaired due to lack of funding for replacement. The northbound platform escalator and one elevator failed in early 2015, prompting Amtrak to initiate replacement of both escalators and elevators. The replacement process was originally expected to require both elevators to be out of service until the project was complete in early 2016. The elevators were taken out of service on July 20, 2015; Amtrak provided an accessible shuttle service between both platforms and the station building. The elevators returned to service on September 1, 2015, though the escalators remained out of service for several months longer. However, elevators and escalators inside the station building suffered similar issues for the next several years. Because Amtrak is exempt from state and local building laws, it circumvented normal rules that require regular elevator inspections.

=== Proposed changes ===
Extension of the Orange Line rapid transit service from Forest Hills to Route 128 has been considered on several occasions. The 1966 Program for Mass Transportation recommended a bifurcated Orange Line, with one branch to West Roxbury or Bird's Hill and another to either Readville or Route 128 via Hyde Park. Various reports over the next two decades continued to recommend various combinations of the extensions; however, due to cost, the 1987 relocation of the Orange Line to the Southwest Corridor was terminated at Forest Hills. The 2004 Program for Mass Transportation listed an extension to Route 128 with intermediate stops at Mount Hope, Hyde Park, and Readville at a cost of $342.8 million. The extension was listed as low priority due to environmental issues with crossing the wetlands south of Readville, and because the corridor already has commuter rail service.

Planning for the Northend Electrification Project indicated that a third track between Readville and Route 128 would be required by 2008 to allow Amtrak trains to pass MBTA trains. In the 2010 Northeast Corridor Master Plan, Amtrak indicated medium-term plans to add this third track. The third track would be located west of the southbound platform, with it converted to an island platform.
