= Boston and Providence Railroad =

Former railroad company operating in Massachusetts and Rhode Island

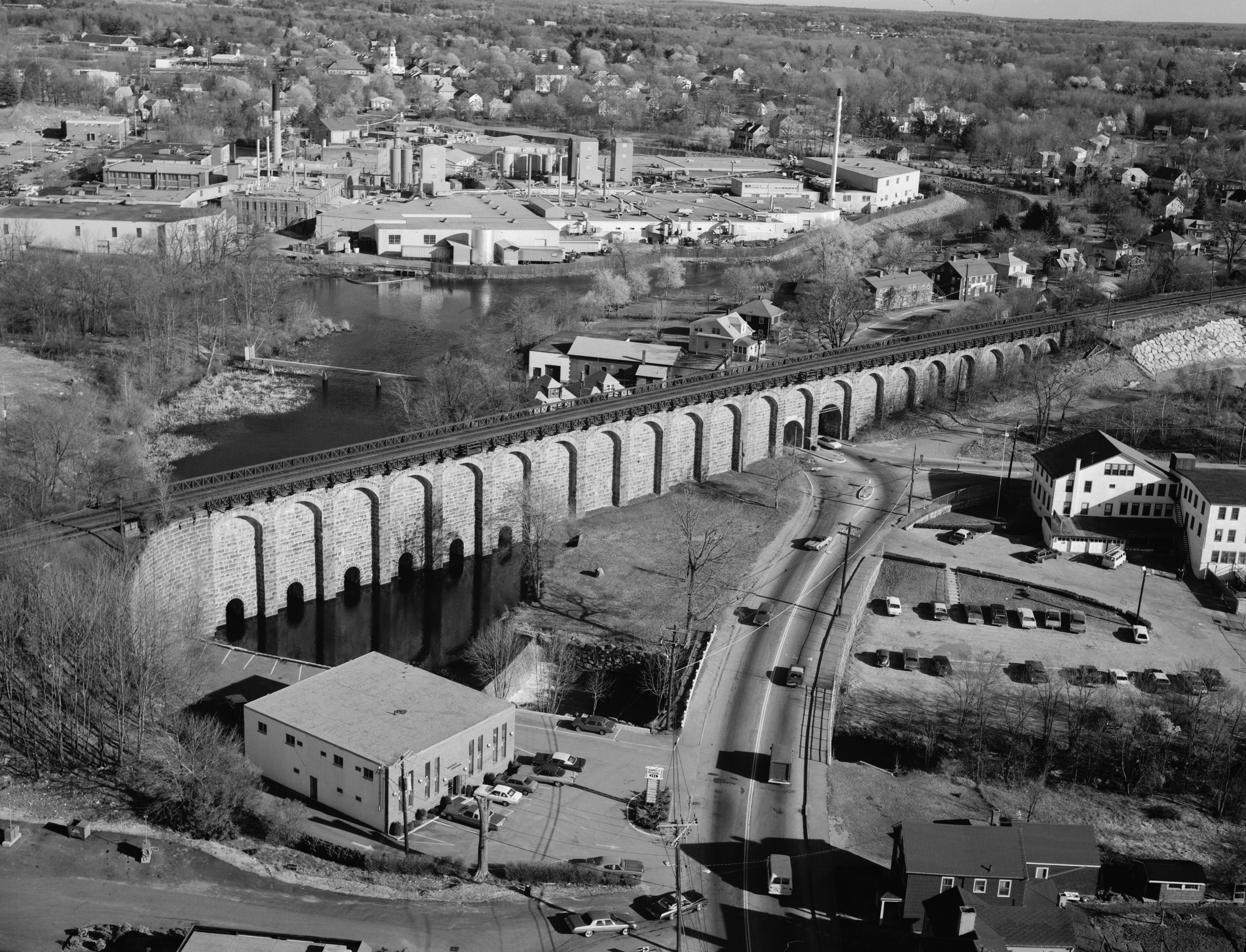
- The Boston and Providence Railroad built the Canton Viaduct in 1835. Revere Copper Mill can be seen in the background

Overview
- Headquarters: Boston, Massachusetts
- Locale: Boston, Massachusetts to Providence, Rhode Island
- Dates of operation: 1834–1888
- Successor: Old Colony Railroad

Technical
- Track gauge: 4 ft 8 1/2 in (1,435 mm) standard gauge
- Length: 41 miles (66 km)

The Boston and Providence Railroad was a railroad company in the states of Massachusetts and Rhode Island which connected its namesake cities. It opened in two sections in 1834 and 1835 – one of the first rail lines in the United States – with a more direct route into Providence built in 1847. Branches were built to Dedham in 1834, Stoughton in 1845, and North Attleboro in 1871. It was acquired by the Old Colony Railroad in 1888, which in turn was leased by the New Haven Railroad in 1893. The line became the New Haven's primary mainline to Boston; it was realigned in Boston in 1899 during the construction of South Station, and in Pawtucket and Central Falls in 1916 for grade crossing elimination.

The line became part of the Penn Central system in 1969; the section in Massachusetts was purchased by the state in 1973, while Amtrak acquired the Rhode Island section in 1976. The line was electrified in 2000; it is now the far northern leg of Amtrak's Northeast Corridor, used by high-speed Acela Express service, intercity Northeast Regional service, and MBTA Commuter Rail Providence/Stoughton Line local service. The rapid transit MBTA Orange Line shares the right-of-way for several miles in the 1987-built Southwest Corridor section in Boston. The Stoughton Branch is also used for Providence/Stoughton Line service, and the northern section of the Dedham Branch is used by the Needham Line.

== History ==
The Boston and Providence Railroad was incorporated June 21, 1831, and chartered to build a railroad between Boston and Providence, Rhode Island.

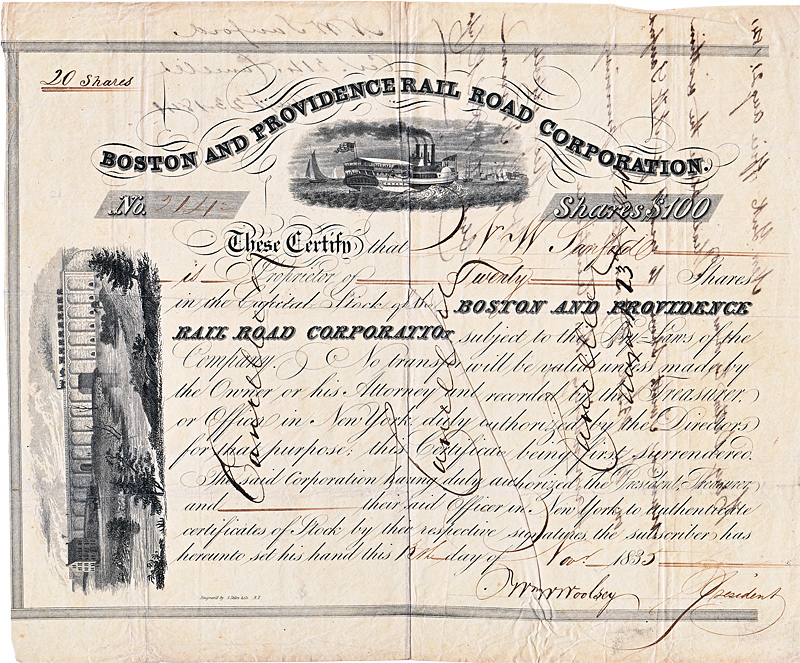
Paper certificate documenting twenty shares of Boston and Providence Rail Road Corporation from 13. November 1835

Construction began in late 1832. The first section, from Boston to Canton with a branch to Dedham, opened in 1834, and the rest on July 28, 1835, with the completion of the Canton Viaduct. This section was undertaken by Daniel Carmichael and Reuben Fairbanks. Stations in Jamaica Plain allowed the development of one of the first commuter suburbs in America.

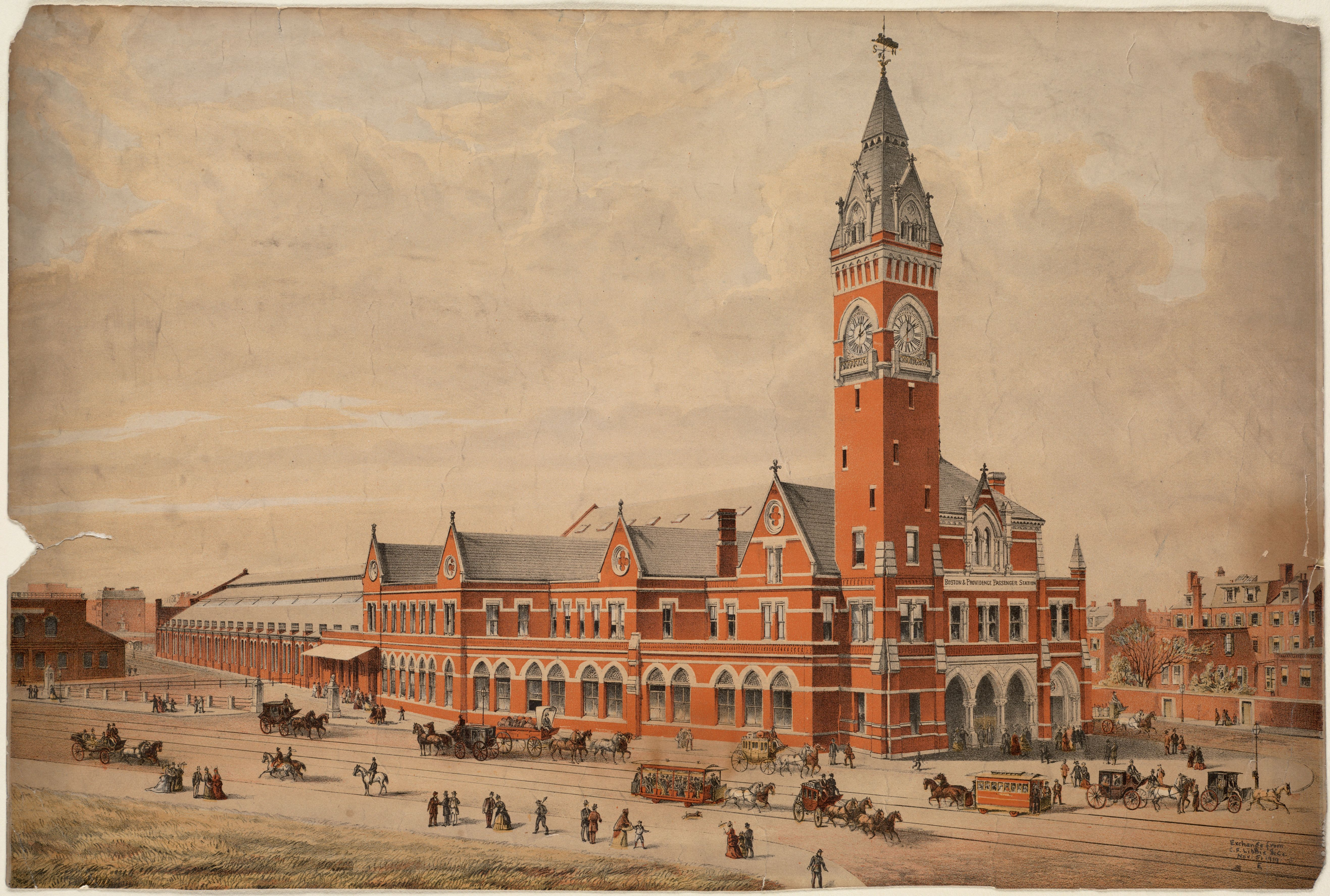
Boston & Providence depot, Boston, 19th century, designed by Peabody & Stearns

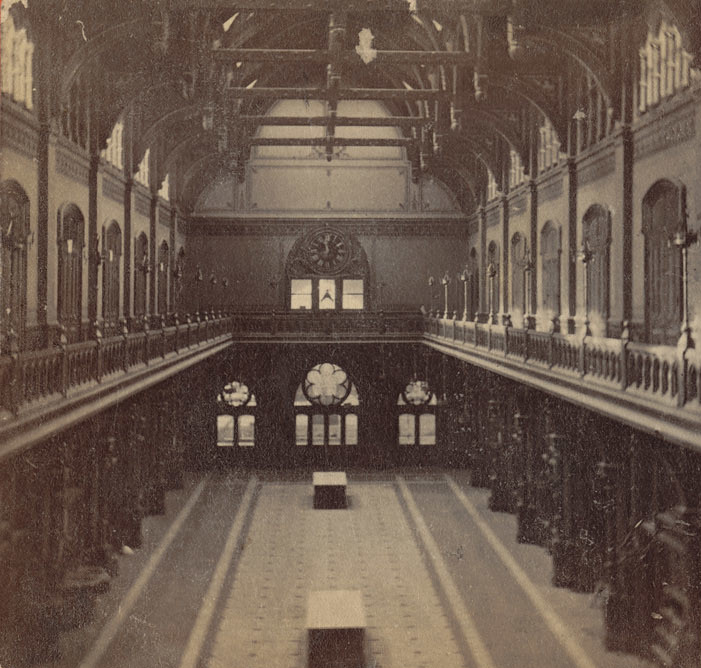
Boston & Providence depot, Boston, 19th century

The line was originally single track. A second track was extended from Boston to Roxbury in 1839 and to Readville in 1845. Double track was built between Sharon and Mansfield in 1846–47; it was extended north to Readville in 1860 and south to Providence in 1865. In May 1869, the state legislature authorized the railroad to build a third track from Boston to Readville. It was completed as far as Forest Hills in late 1871, allowing for an increase in service. The section between Hyde Park and Readville was increased to four tracks in 1873; the third track was extended south from Forest Hills to Mount Hope later in the 1870s. It was completed between Mount Hope and Hyde Park in 1882, finishing triple-tracking between Boston and Readville.

In 1887, the railroad's Bussey Bridge collapsed while a morning commuter train was passing over it. The train was carrying eight crew and 275 to 300 passengers; 23 people died and over 100 were injured. Henry Austin Whitney was the president of the railroad at the time.

Until 1899, when South Station opened, the Boston terminal was at Park Square, with a crossing at grade of the Boston and Worcester Railroad at the current merge at Back Bay station (also opened in 1899, serving only the B&P). The original Providence terminal was at Fox Point, from which it ran east along the Seekonk River shore and over the river via the India Point Railroad Bridge into East Providence (then part of Seekonk, Massachusetts) before turning north towards Boston. A ferry across the Providence River connected Fox Point to the South Providence terminal of the New York, Providence and Boston Railroad (opened 1837). The former mainline became the primarily-freight East Junction Branch.

In 1847, the Providence and Worcester Railroad opened between downtown Providence and Worcester, Massachusetts. At the same time, the B&P built a connection west from its main line in southern Attleboro to the P&W in Central Falls. The B&P and P&W jointly owned the line south of Central Falls into downtown Providence. (In 1848, the NYP&B connected its line south of downtown Providence to downtown, removing the gap through Providence.)

On April 1, 1888, the Old Colony Railroad leased the B&P for 99 years. The New York, New Haven and Hartford Railroad leased the Old Colony on March 1, 1893, and assumed the lease. The New Haven used the B&P as part of its main Boston–New York City Shore Line.

When Boston's South Station opened in 1899, a new line was built along the south side of the Boston and Albany Railroad to it, near the B&A's terminal. The old line to Park Square was abandoned.

The East Side Railroad Tunnel opened in 1908 between the East Side of Providence, Rhode Island and downtown Providence. This provided a second route into Providence, using the old alignment to East Providence and the Crook Point Bascule Bridge over the Seekonk River leading to the tunnel. The tunnel is no longer in use, having been disconnected on the downtown side, with its entrance underneath the What Cheer Building, owned by RISD.

In 1939, the railroad filed with the Interstate Commerce Commission for reorganization in the New Haven rail system or operation as an independent line.

== Current status ==
The Penn Central Transportation Company was created in 1968 through a merger that included the New York, New Haven and Hartford Railroad. The Penn Central bankruptcy in the early 1970s coincided with the creation of Amtrak. Penn Central merged the Boston and Providence Railroad into itself in 1972.

The New Haven's former B&P Boston-New York City main line was included with the former Pennsylvania Railroad's New York City-Washington, D.C. main line as a new high-speed passenger route for Amtrak, the Northeast Corridor. It hosts the Acela, the only high-speed rail service in North America.

In 1973, the MBTA purchased the portion of the B&P main line in Massachusetts, including the Stoughton Branch, forming what is now the Providence/Stoughton Line. The portion in Rhode Island was sold to Amtrak in 1976.

=== Branches ===
Dedham

The first branch was the Dedham Branch to Dedham from Readville, opened in 1834 with the first section of the railroad. The Norfolk County Railroad opened in 1849, continuing from Dedham to the southwest. In 1850, a second branch to Dedham opened from Forest Hills, forming a loop. Another outlet for the Dedham Branch opened in 1906, with a connection west to the New England Railroad at Needham Junction. The Dedham Branch from Forest Hills to that connection is still in use as the Needham Branch of the MBTA Commuter Rail, but the rest of the Dedham loop has been abandoned.

Stoughton

The Stoughton Branch Railroad was incorporated April 16, 1844 as a branch of the B&P from Canton Junction to Stoughton. It opened in early 1845, and is still in use for passengers as a branch of the main line to Attleboro and Providence.

Easton

The Easton Branch Railroad was incorporated in 1854 and opened in 1855 as a continuation of the Stoughton Branch beyond Stoughton. In 1865, the Old Colony and Newport Railway bought the line and incorporated the majority of it into its main line.

Taunton

The Taunton Branch Railroad was incorporated in 1835 to build a branch from the B&P in Mansfield to Taunton, opening in 1836. The branch was operated by the B&P until 1840, when the New Bedford and Taunton Railroad opened, continuing the line past Taunton.

In 1870, the Mansfield and Framingham Railroad opened, continuing the Taunton Branch northwest on the other side of the B&P. A connection between the Taunton Branch northwest of Taunton and the B&P in Attleboro opened in 1871, built by the Taunton Branch.

Attleborough

The Attleborough Branch Railroad opened in 1870, running from the B&P in Attleboro northwest to North Attleborough. It was leased to the B&P, and was connected to a branch of the Old Colony Railroad in 1890.

Moshassuck Valley

The Moshassuck Valley Railroad was chartered in 1874 and opened in 1876 as a branch from the joint B&P/P&W at Woodlawn, Rhode Island north to Saylesville. The company remained independent until 1981, when it was bought by the P&W.

Seekonk

The Seekonk Branch Railroad was a short spur on the east side of the Seekonk River, from the B&P south to a dock on the river. It was incorporated in 1836 and opened soon after, with the hope that it would run its own trains over the B&P, as with a highway. As a result of this, the Massachusetts State Legislature passed a law that a railroad company could refuse any traffic on its road, and the company was a failure. The B&P bought it in 1839, and the Providence, Warren and Bristol Railroad built a line from it in 1855.

Warren, Bristol and Fall River

The Providence and Bristol Railroad was incorporated in 1850 and 1851, and reorganized in 1852 as the Providence, Warren and Bristol Railroad. It opened in 1855 from the old Seekonk Branch in East Providence southeast to Warren and south to Bristol. It was owned by the B&P through a majority of stock, and leased the Old Colony Railroad in 1891.

The Warren and Fall River Railroad was incorporated in Rhode Island in 1856, and the Fall River and Warren Railroad in Massachusetts in 1857. In 1860 the two were merged to form the Fall River, Warren and Providence Railroad, opening later in 1860 from Warren east to Somerset, across the Taunton River from Fall River. In 1875, the Boston and Providence Railroad Bridge opened, connecting to the Old Colony Railroad in Fall River. At that time, the company was leased by the Old Colony; before that it had been controlled by the B&P.

== Station listing ==
=== Main line ===
This listing includes all stations that have existed along the post-1847 B&P alignment from Park Square, Boston, to Providence. Mileage is from Park Square; distances to South Station are 0.8 miles longer. These mileages reflect the pre-realignment routings in Pawtucket and Providence. Some stations were not opened until after the B&P had merged into the Old Colony. Currently open stations are highlighted.

State	Milepost	City	Station	Opening date	Closing date	Notes
MA	0.0	Boston	Park Square (Boston)	June 1834	1899	Abandoned when South Station replaced the separate southside railroad terminals
MA	0.5	Boston	Back Bay	1899		Built in 1899 during the realignment into South Station; rebuilt in 1928 and 1979–1987. The Boston and Albany Railroad mainline (now the Framingham/Worcester Line) crossed the B&P at this location.
MA	1.1	Boston	Chickering		1896	Located at Gainsborough Street and Camden Street, this station was likely closed during the 1890s grade separation project. The modern Massachusetts Avenue station is located one block away.
MA	1.5	Boston	Ruggles	October 5, 1987		Opened in 1987 as part of Southwest Corridor reconstruction; no previous station had been located there. Orange Line began on May 4, 1987.
MA	2.0	Boston	Roxbury	June 1834	c. 1920s	Rebuilt in 1897. Roxbury Crossing station on the Orange Line is located at the same site.
MA	2.5	Boston	Heath Street	c. 1850s	c. 1930s	Rebuilt in 1897. Jackson Square station on the Orange Line is located at the same site.
MA	3.1	Boston	Boylston	c. 1840s	September 29, 1940	Rebuilt in 1897. Stony Brook station on the Orange Line is located at the same site.
MA	3.6	Boston	Jamaica Plain	c. 1842	September 29, 1940	Rebuilt in 1897. Green Street station on the Orange Line is located at the same site.
MA	4.3	Boston	Forest Hills	c. 1830s June 1973; October 19, 1987	September 29, 1940; October 13, 1979	Rebuilt in 1897 and 1979–1987. Station is currently served only by Needham Line trains, which split onto the West Roxbury Branch at the station. The Orange Line served a nearby elevated station from 1909 to 1987, then moved to the modern station on May 4, 1987.
MA	5.4	Boston	Mount Hope	c. 1880s	November 2, 1979	Located at Blakemore Street.
MA	6.4	Boston	Clarendon Hills		Before 1964	Located at Metropolitan Avenue.
MA	6.9	Boston	Hazelwood		Before 1964	Located at Arlington Street.
MA	7.5	Boston	Hyde Park	c. 1840s October 5, 1987	November 2, 1979	Rebuilt in 1979–1987. Formerly known as Fairmount.
MA	8.8	Boston	Readville	June 1834; October 5, 1987	November 2, 1979	Junction with the Midland Railroad and former Dedham Branch. Rebuilt c. 1900 and in 1992.
MA	10.8	Dedham and Westwood	Route 128	c. 1860s April 26, 1953	c. 1920s	Rebuilt in 1965 and 2000. Previous station was known as Green Lodge.
MA	11.8	Canton	Dedham Road		Before 1964	Also known as Canton Road.
MA	14.1	Canton	Canton Junction	June 1834		Split with Stoughton Branch. Rebuilt in 1892 and c. 2000.
MA	17.3	Sharon	Sharon	June 1835		Rebuilt c. 1870s and 1936.
MA	18.6	Sharon	Sharon Heights		Before 1964	Junction with Lake Massapoag branch.
MA	21.7	Foxborough	East Foxboro		November 1977	Located at Community Way.
MA	24.0	Mansfield	Mansfield	June 1835		Rebuilt in 1955 and 2004. Junction with Mansfield and Framingham Railroad (now Framingham Secondary) and former Taunton Branch Railroad.
MA	26.7	Mansfield	West Mansfield		Before 1964	Also known as Tobeys. Located at Balcom Street.
MA	31.1	Attleboro	Attleboro	June 1835		Junction with New Bedford and Taunton Railroad Attleborough Branch (now Middleboro Subdivision) and former B&P Attleborough Branch. Rebuilt in 1906.
MA	32.8	Attleboro	Dodgeville		Before 1964	Located off South Main Street.
MA	33.5	Attleboro	East Junction	c. 1847	Before 1964	Flag stop only. Junction with former main line to East Providence.
MA	34.4	Attleboro	Hebronville	c. 1847	Before 1964	Located at Knight Avenue.
MA	36.3	Attleboro	South Attleboro	June 20, 1990	February 26, 2021 (temporary)	No previous station was located at the site.
RI	38.2	Central Falls	Central Falls	c. 1847	June 16, 1916	Located at Central Street. Providence and Worcester Railroad diverged slightly to the north at Boston Switch. Replaced by Pawtucket-Central Falls in 1916.
RI	38.4	Pawtucket	Pawtucket–Central Falls	June 16, 1916	February 19, 1981	Replaced the separate Pawtucket and Central Falls stations during a realignment and grade separation project.
RI	38.6	Pawtucket	Pawtucket	c. 1847	June 16, 1916	Replaced by Pawtucket-Central Falls in 1916. Located on the old alignment, slightly to the south of the current tracks.
RI	38.9	Pawtucket	Pawtucket/Central Falls	January 3, 2023		
RI	39.6	Pawtucket	Woodlawn	c. 1847	Before 1964	Junction with Moshassuck Valley Railroad. Located at Grotto Avenue.
RI	43.0	Providence	Providence	October 25, 1847		Rebuilt in 1898 as Union Station; replaced by the modern station on a new alignment in 1986. Junction with the former Providence, Warren and Bristol Railroad.

=== Stoughton Branch ===
State	Milepost	City	Station	Opening date	Closing date	Notes
MA	0.0	Canton	Canton Junction	June 1834		Split with B&P mainline. Rebuilt in 1892 and c. 2000.
MA	0.6	Canton	Canton Center	c. 1845		Formerly South Canton.
MA	1.7	Canton	Springdale	c. 1845	1940	At Pine Street; also known as Spring Dale.
MA	2.9	Stoughton	West Stoughton	c. 1845	Before 1964	At Central Street; also known as Birds.
MA	3.9	Stoughton	Stoughton	1845		Former Easton Branch (part of Dighton and Somerset Railroad after 1865) continued. Formerly Stoughton Central.
