= Providence/Stoughton Line =

Line of the Boston MBTA Commuter Rail system

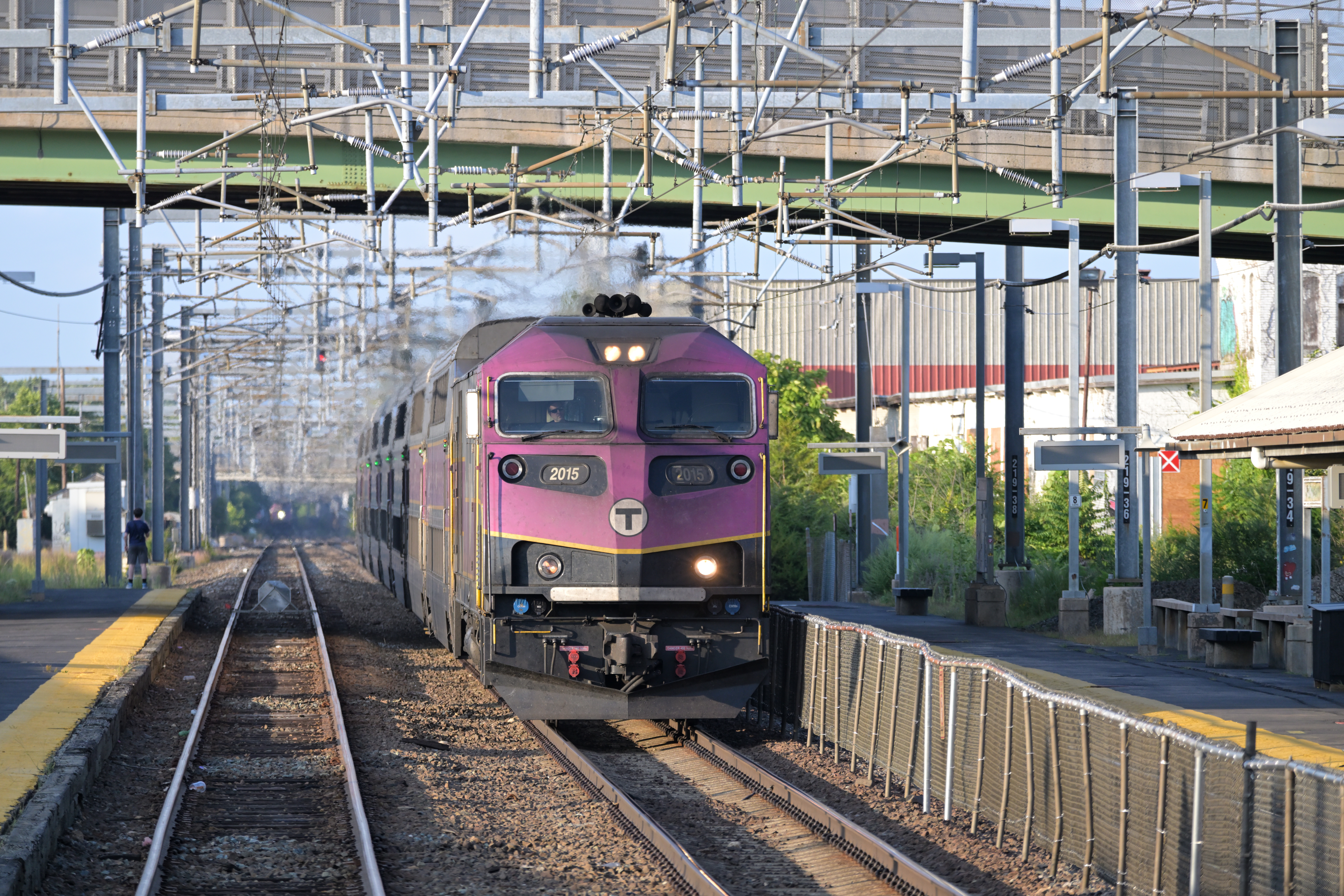
- An outbound Providence/Stoughton Line train passing Readville in September 2025

Overview
- Owner: MBTA (within Massachusetts); Amtrak (within Rhode Island)
- Locale: Southeastern Massachusetts; Rhode Island
- Termini: South Station; Wickford Junction, Stoughton
- Stations: 18
- Website: www.mbta.com/schedules/CR-Providence

Service
- System: MBTA Commuter Rail
- Train number(s): 6001-6042, 6301-6332 (weekdays); 6501-6520 (weekends)
- Operator: Keolis North America
- Daily ridership: 19,078 (2024)

Technical
- Line length: 62.9 miles (101.2 km) (South Station–Wickford Junction); 18.9 miles (30.4 km) (South Station–Stoughton)
- Track gauge: 4 ft 8 1/2 in (1,435 mm)

The Providence/Stoughton Line is an MBTA Commuter Rail service in Massachusetts and Rhode Island, primarily serving the southwestern suburbs of Boston. Most service runs entirely on the Northeast Corridor between South Station in Boston and Providence station or Wickford Junction station in Rhode Island, while the Stoughton Branch splits at Canton Junction and terminates at Stoughton. It is the longest MBTA Commuter Rail line, and the only one that operates outside Massachusetts. The line is the busiest on the MBTA Commuter Rail system, with 19,078 daily boardings in a 2024 count.

The portion between Boston and Providence was originally built by the Boston and Providence Railroad between 1834 and 1847. The portion south of Providence was built by the New York, Providence and Boston Railroad in 1837, while the Stoughton Branch was built by the Stoughton Branch Railroad in 1845. The lines were acquired by the New York, New Haven and Hartford Railroad in the 1890s.

The MBTA began subsidizing service in the 1960s, and purchased the infrastructure and rolling stock from Penn Central in 1973. Service was cut back to Attleboro in 1981, but rush-hour service returned as far as Providence in 1988 under an agreement with the state of Rhode Island. Off-peak service to Rhode Island resumed in 2000. An extension south from Providence opened to T. F. Green Airport in 2010 and to Wickford Junction in 2012. All stations have been made accessible with high-level platforms. Newer stations like T.F. Green Airport, as well as stations shared with Amtrak, largely have full-length high level platforms; older stations have mostly been retrofitted with "mini-high" platforms one car length long.

== History ==
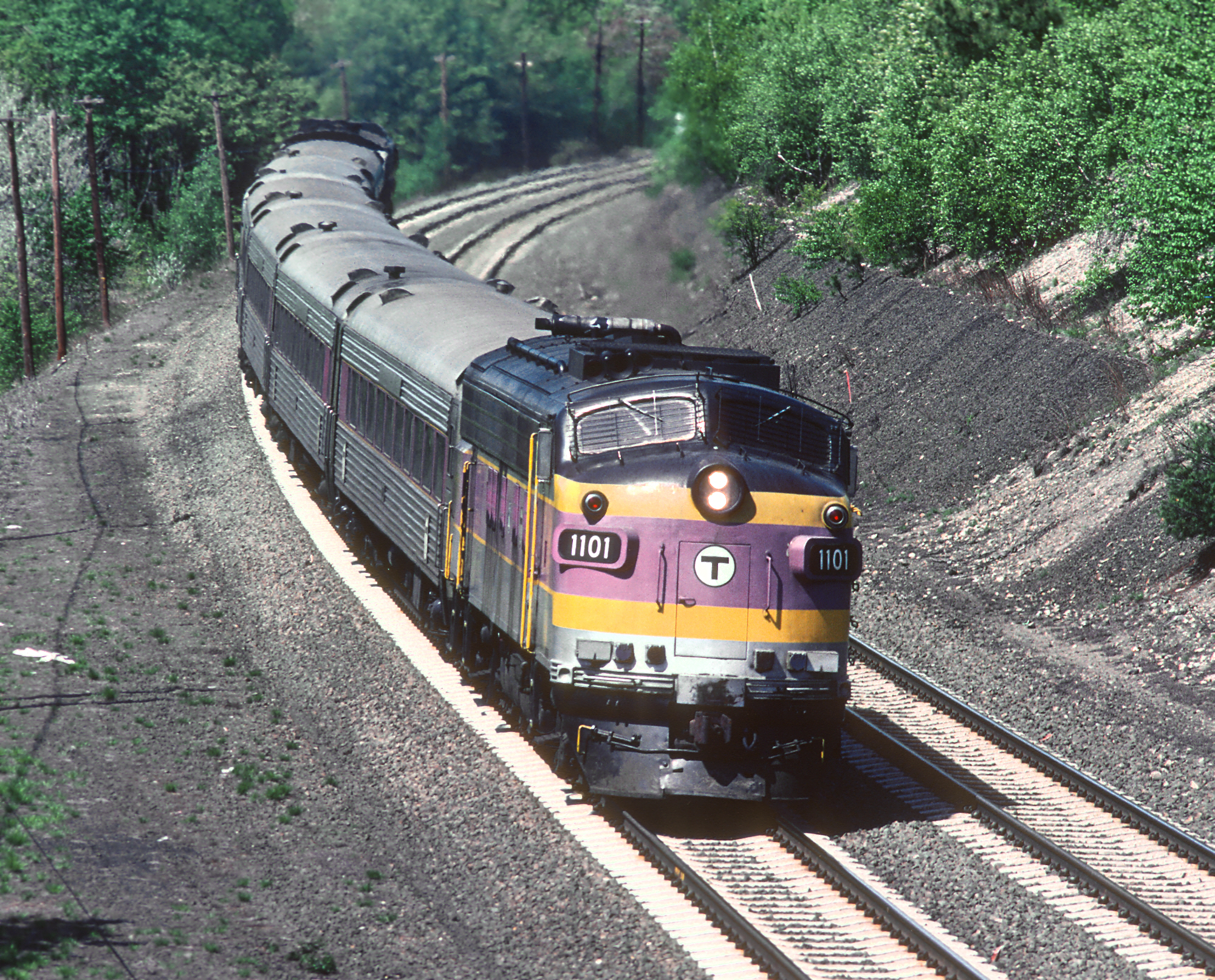
An Attleboro/Stoughton Line train in 1982

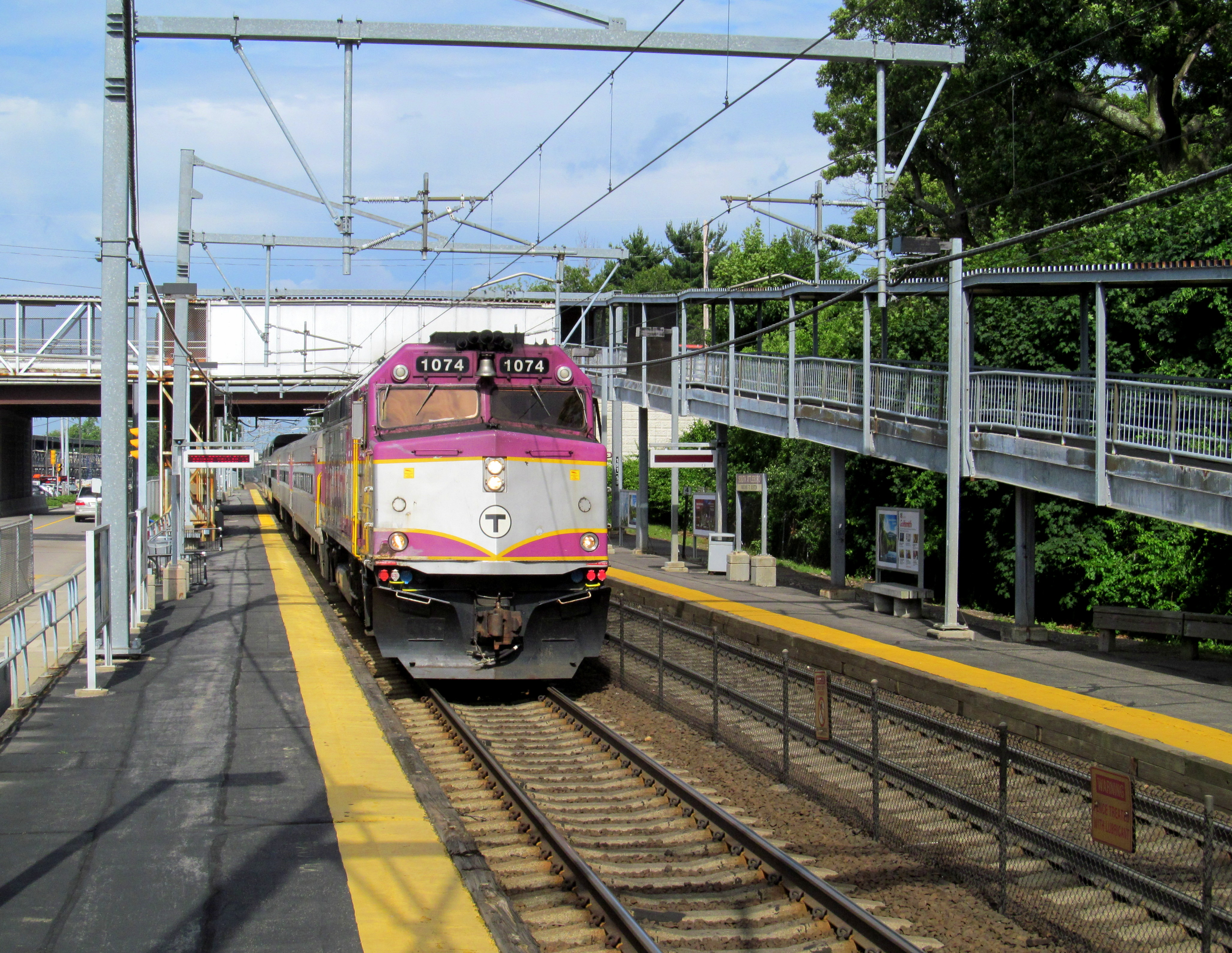
South Attleboro station opened in 1990. This photograph was taken in 2013.

The Boston and Providence Railroad (B&P) opened between Boston and Sprague Mansion in 1834, and on to Providence in 1835. A new line between Providence and East Junction via Central Falls, shared with the Providence and Worcester Railroad south of Central Falls, opened in October 1847. The B&P was leased by the Old Colony Railroad in 1888; the Old Colony was in turn leased by the New York, New Haven and Hartford Railroad in 1893.

At the peak of service around the turn of the century, weekday service included six Boston–Providence local round trips, seven round trips from Taunton and New Bedford via Mansfield, 62 Boston–Forest Hills round trips running every 15 minutes, 12 Boston–Dedham round trips via Readville and 24 via West Roxbury, and 11 intercity round trips from beyond Providence. Connections to additional branch line trains were made at Canton Junction, Mansfield, and East Junction. Forest Hills service was soon decimated by the competing Washington Street Elevated; branch line service declined in the 1920s and 1930s. Further reductions occurred after World War II; cuts in July 1959 reduced Providence service from 12 to nine round trips, Dedham service to one round trip, and Stoughton service to two round trips.

=== MBTA era ===
On December 31, 1968, the recently formed Penn Central bought the failing New York, New Haven and Hartford Railroad. The MBTA bought the section of the Providence–Boston line in Massachusetts, as well as many other lines including the Stoughton Branch, from Penn Central on January 27, 1973. On April 1, 1976 Conrail took over Penn Central and the commuter rail equipment was sold to the MBTA. Conrail continued to operate the line under contract to the MBTA until 1977, when the Boston and Maine Railroad became the sole contractor for all MBTA commuter rail service. Full subsidies by the MBTA for the Providence and Stoughton lines began on September 28, 1976, before which the Federal government helped. On March 31, 1977, the Greater Attleboro Taunton Regional Transit Authority and Rhode Island Department of Transportation began to subsidize service beyond the MBTA district, and Stoughton began to pay to keep its station open, that cost later going to the Brockton Area Transit Authority.

On November 3, 1979, the line was closed north of Readville for long-term reconstruction as part of the Southwest Corridor project. All trains began using what is now the Fairmount Line, and special shuttle trains connected South Station to Back Bay. The new line, rebuilt below grade with space for three tracks (the old one had been above grade with room for four tracks), opened on October 5, 1987. The Orange Line shares the corridor between Back Bay and Forest Hills.

After Rhode Island cut back its subsidy, Sunday service was truncated to Attleboro in October 1977, with off-peak and Saturday service following suit in April 1979. On February 20, 1981, the MBTA stopped serving Rhode Island altogether after that state declined to renew its subsidy. On September 17, 1986, Massachusetts and Rhode Island reached an agreement to resume service. Rush-hour service to Rhode Island was restored on February 1, 1988. On June 20, 1990, a new stop opened in South Attleboro and most trains were extended to the station; regular Sunday service returned in 1992.

In 1990, a northbound commuter train was involved in a collision with a northbound Night Owl train. The accident, which occurred to the west of Back Bay station, injured over four hundred people, although there were no fatalities.

Some off-peak weekday trains were extended to Providence starting on December 11, 2000. On July 24, 2006, the MBTA increased weekday Providence service from 11 to 15 daily round trips. Weekend service to Providence resumed on July 29, and a new layover facility was opened in Pawtucket.

=== Extensions ===
==== Providence Line ====
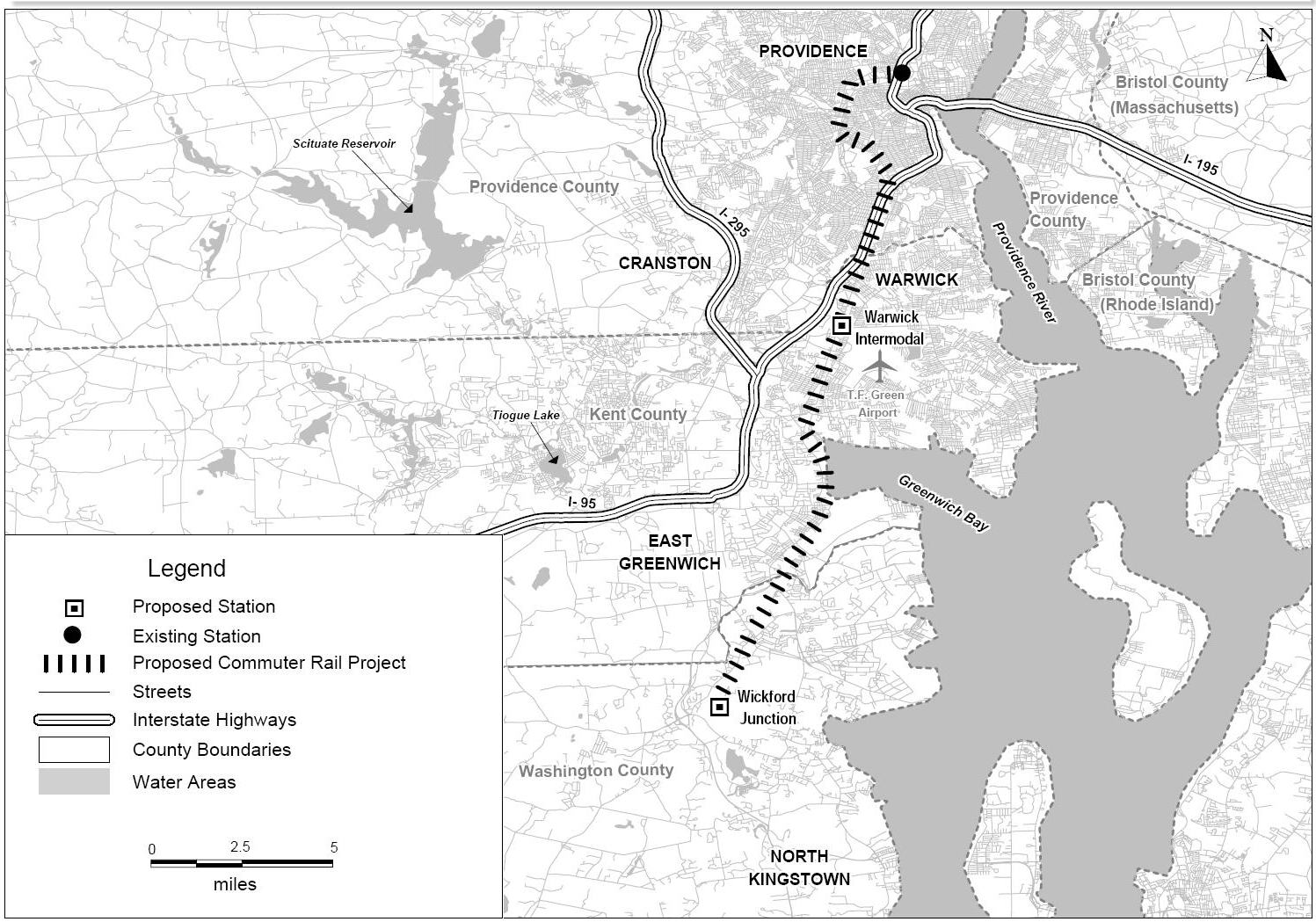
Map of South County Commuter Rail project, showing the extension to T.F. Green Airport and Wickford Junction

The South County Commuter Rail initiative, a 20-mile extension past Providence to T. F. Green Airport and Wickford Junction in Rhode Island was implemented between 2010 and 2012. The T. F. Green Airport part of the extension opened in December 2010, with Wickford Junction service beginning in April 2012. An infill station at Pawtucket/Central Falls opened on January 23, 2023.

Additional studies and proposals to expand Providence Line service have occurred; though none have been funded or pursued. In 2001, prior to the South County extension, the Rhode Island Department of Transportation considered constructing infill stations in Cranston and East Greenwich along with the addition of extending commuter service to existing Amtrak stations in Kingston and Westerly. Under this plan, RIDOT proposed the establishment of its own statewide commuter service along the Northeast Corridor that would connect with MBTA service and an extension of CTrail's Shore Line East. Ultimately, the MBTA would be contracted to operate trains as far as Wickford Junction, with Kingston and Westerly being relegated to only Northeast Regional service.

Following the completion of the South County Commuter Rail Initiative, RIDOT's 2014 State Rail Plan recommended the implementation of an electric multiple unit shuttle service between Wickford Junction and Providence via T.F. Green Airport with half-hour headways. The service was expected to increase ridership at Wickford to as much as 3,400 riders per day; however, plans were dropped following the lower than expected ridership of the extension. An extension to Westerly was once again studied by RIDOT in 2017; the study also assessed electrification and extensions of Shore Line East service to Westerly or Kingston. Ultimately, none of the alternatives moved beyond the preliminary study phase. A passing siding and new platforms at Kingston were completed in 2017, which may enable commuter services in the future.

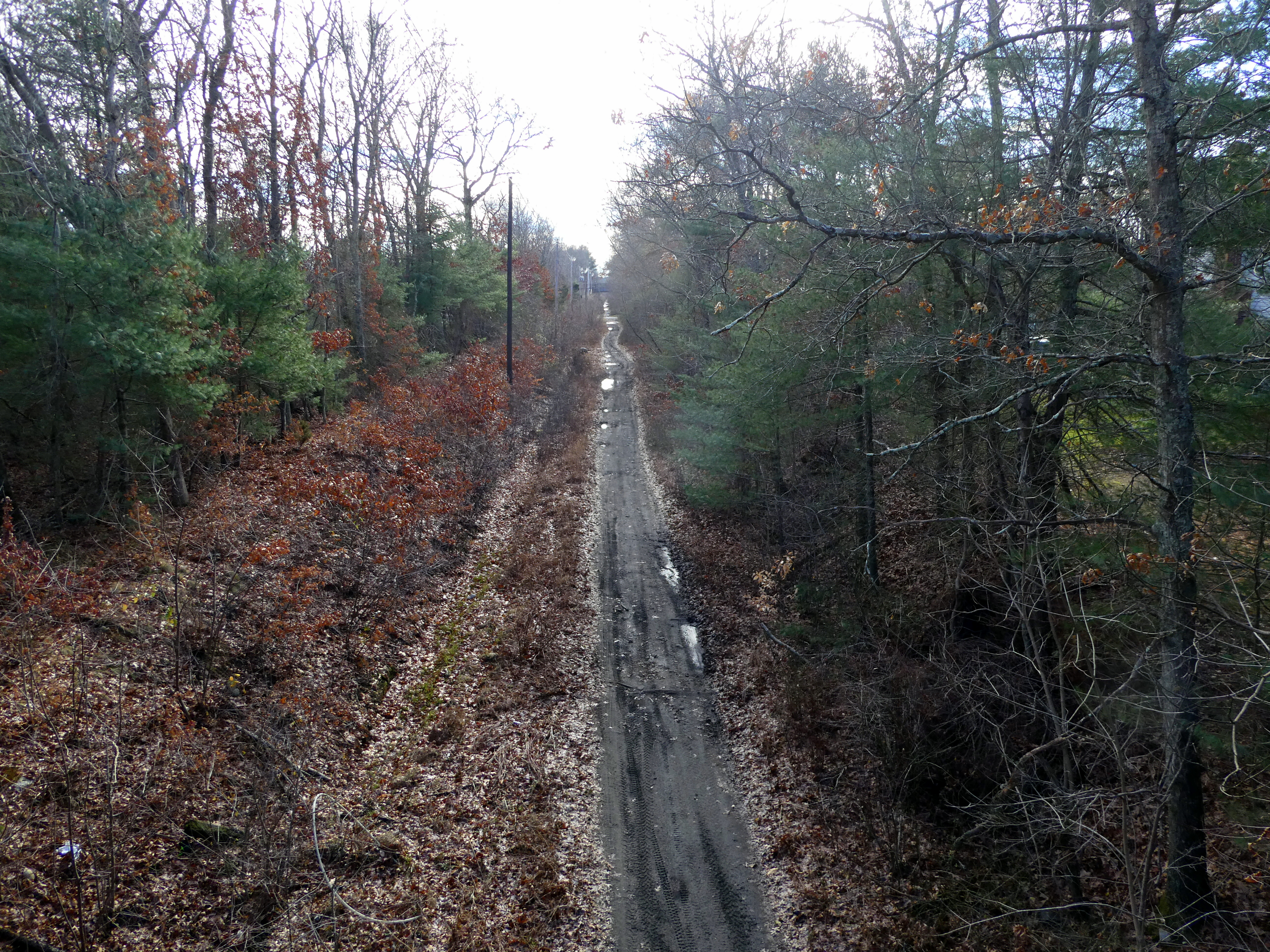
Abandoned D&S railbed in Raynham that would be restored for Phase 2 of South Coast Rail

==== Stoughton Branch ====
A major extension of the Stoughton Branch has been proposed since the late-1980s as a part of the South Coast Rail project. In the mid-2010s, South Coast Rail was split into two phases with the Stoughton extension being relegated to Phase 2 of the project due to rising costs. As proposed, Phase 2 would extend the Stoughton Branch south over the abandoned Dighton and Somerset Railroad through Easton, Raynham, and Taunton before meeting the Fall River/New Bedford Line at East Taunton. Currently, the line between Stoughton and Dean Street in Taunton is abandoned; however, the route was rail-banked for future service, precluding it from overdevelopment. Upon completion, Fall River/New Bedford service would be rerouted via Stoughton instead of Middleborough. Preliminary plans called for the reconstruction of Canton Center and Stoughton stations; new stations on the extended route would include North Easton, Easton Village, Raynham Place, and Taunton. As of 2025, the development of Phase 2 has stalled since 2019.

=== Electrification ===
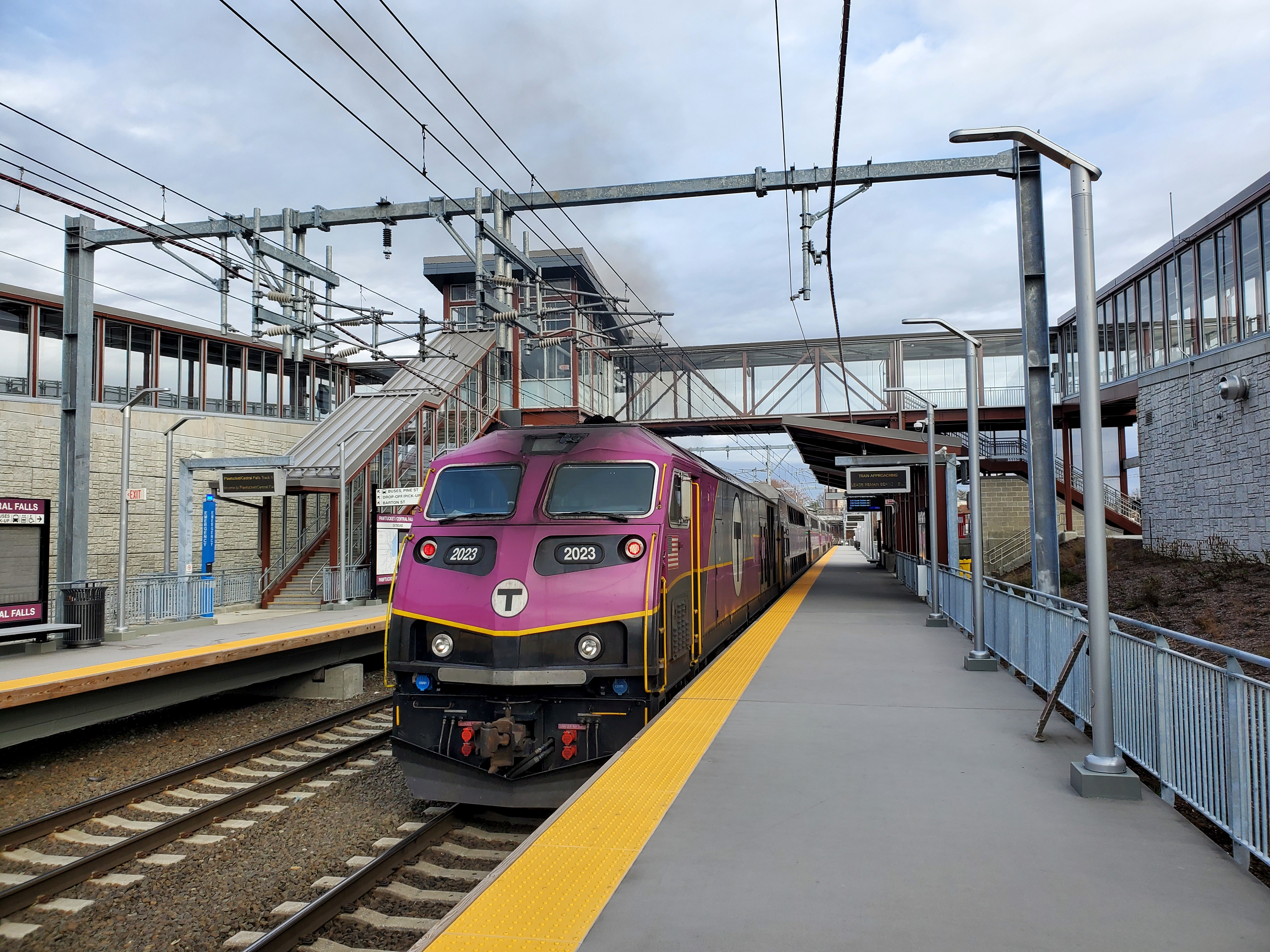
The MBTA Commuter Rail currently operates diesel locomotives on the electrified Northeast Corridor

Amtrak electrified the Northeast Corridor north of New Haven to Boston as part of the Northeast High Speed Rail Improvement Program in 2000; however, the MBTA has not utilized this, and continues to operate diesel locomotives under-wire. Electrified commuter service had not been pursued due to costs associated with traction substation expansion, electric multiple unit procurement, as well as additional catenary installation at several station sidings and layover facilities. By the late 2010s, the MBTA began exploring options to pilot electric trains for Providence service as part of a long-term transition to regional rail.

The MBTA would propose several pilots for electric Providence service during the early 2020s; however, none would come to fruition. In 2019, the MBTA had preliminary discussions with Amtrak about leasing Siemens ACS-64 electric locomotives to test on the Providence Line. By 2021, the MBTA shifted plans to instead pilot electric multiple units (EMU) on Providence service in 2024, with the Fairmount Line and the inner section of the Newburyport/Rockport Line electrified later in the decade. In June 2022 the MBTA reversed plans and specified that pilot electric service would utilize leased Amtrak locomotives, not EMUs, in 2024; additionally, long-term electrification would utilize battery-electric multiple units (BEMU) on the Providence/Stoughton Line and Fairmount Line by 2028–29. By 2024, all plans to pilot electric service on the Providence Line had been indefinitely postponed.

In late 2022 RIDOT applied for a $3 million Consolidated Rail Infrastructure and Safety Improvement (CRISI) grant to study Providence Line electrification; however, the application was rejected by the FRA in 2023, which precluded the study. In July 2024, the MBTA and Keolis moved forward with a proposal to procure and operate BEMUs on the Fairmount Line by 2028; however, Providence service was omitted due to increased fleet requirements.

Several preliminary projects to enable electric service have been proposed or are underway. A 1.7-mile (2.7 km) section of non-electrified platform sidings at Attleboro, not included in the initial Amtrak electrification, was planned for electrification in mid-2022 to support future electric MBTA operations; however, the project was delayed and completed in mid-2024. Electrification of the station siding at T.F. Green Airport to enable Northeast Regional service has been subjected to several planning studies. Preliminary plans for Phase 2 of the South Coast Rail project would fully electrify the Stoughton extension and the Phase 1 route.

In February 2026, the MBTA announced plans to acquire 10 new battery-electric locomotives for electrified Providence Line service.

=== Special event service ===
In August 1971, the MBTA began operating Boston–Foxboro and Providence–Foxboro service for events at the new Foxboro Stadium. Providence service ended early in the 1973 season due to insufficient ridership; Boston service ended that October. Boston service via the Franklin Line resumed in 1986. It was rerouted over the Providence/Stoughton Line in 1989, with intermediate stops at Back Bay, Hyde Park, Route 128, Canton Junction, Sharon, and Mansfield; a reverse move was made at Mansfield to access the Framingham Secondary. Boston–Foxboro service was again rerouted over the Franklin Line in 1995. Providence–Foxboro event service resumed for the 1997 season, with intermediate stops at South Attleboro, Attleboro, and Mansfield. Event service was extended to T.F. Green Airport in 2012, but cut back to Providence in 2019.

=== COVID-19 pandemic ===
Substantially reduced schedules were in effect from March 16 to June 23, 2020. Service changes effective November 2, 2020, shifted some peak service to off-peak, providing 60-minute all-day headways between Providence and Boston. Reduced schedules were again put in effect on December 14, 2020. As part of a schedule change on January 23, 2021, Sunday morning Boston–Providence service began operation for the first time since the New Haven era. On February 26, 2021, South Attleboro station was temporarily closed due to structural deterioration. Full service was restored on April 5, 2021. As part of that schedule change, all Providence/Stoughton Line trains began stopping at Ruggles station after an additional platform there was completed. Additionally, the final Providence-bound train on weekdays began stopping at Forest Hills station to provide a transfer to a shuttle train to Needham. During the closure of the Orange Line from August 19 to September 18, 2022, additional Providence/Stoughton Line trains stopped at Forest Hills. One of these trains – a midday Providence outbound – continued to stop after September 19.

Daily ridership reached 17,648 in October 2022 – 69% of pre-COVID ridership. On October 2, 2023, the last evening Stoughton-bound train began operating via the Fairmount Line – the first such service since 2004. South Attleboro station reopened with limited weekday service – three northbound and four southbound trains – on May 20, 2024. All weekend service and some weekday service began stopping at Readville station to provide timed transfers with Franklin/Foxboro Line trains operating over the Fairmount Line. Daily ridership was 19,068 by 2024.

== Service ==
As of July 2025, weekday service has 21 Boston–Providence round trips, 8 of which run to Wickford Junction, and 16 Boston–Stoughton round trips. Weekend service has 10 Boston–Providence round trips, with no Wickford Junction or Stoughton service.

The main branch forms the far northern leg of Amtrak's Northeast Corridor. All Acela Express trains and all Northeast Regional routes between Boston and New York City run along this line. South Station, Back Bay, Route 128 and Providence have long ranked among the busiest Amtrak stations in the country. With fast and frequent MBTA and Amtrak service, the Providence-Boston share of the Northeast Corridor is one of the busiest rail lines in the country.

=== Ownership and financing ===
The MBTA owns the section from Boston to the Rhode Island border (called the Attleboro Line), while Amtrak owns all track in Rhode Island. The entire line is part of the Northeast Corridor.

As part of the 1988 Pilgrim Partnership Agreement, Rhode Island provides capital funding (including some of its federal formula funds) for MBTA expansion in the state. Massachusetts (through the MBTA) provides the operating subsidy for MBTA Commuter Rail service in return. Rhode Island also pays Amtrak to allow the MBTA to use its tracks.

== Station listing ==
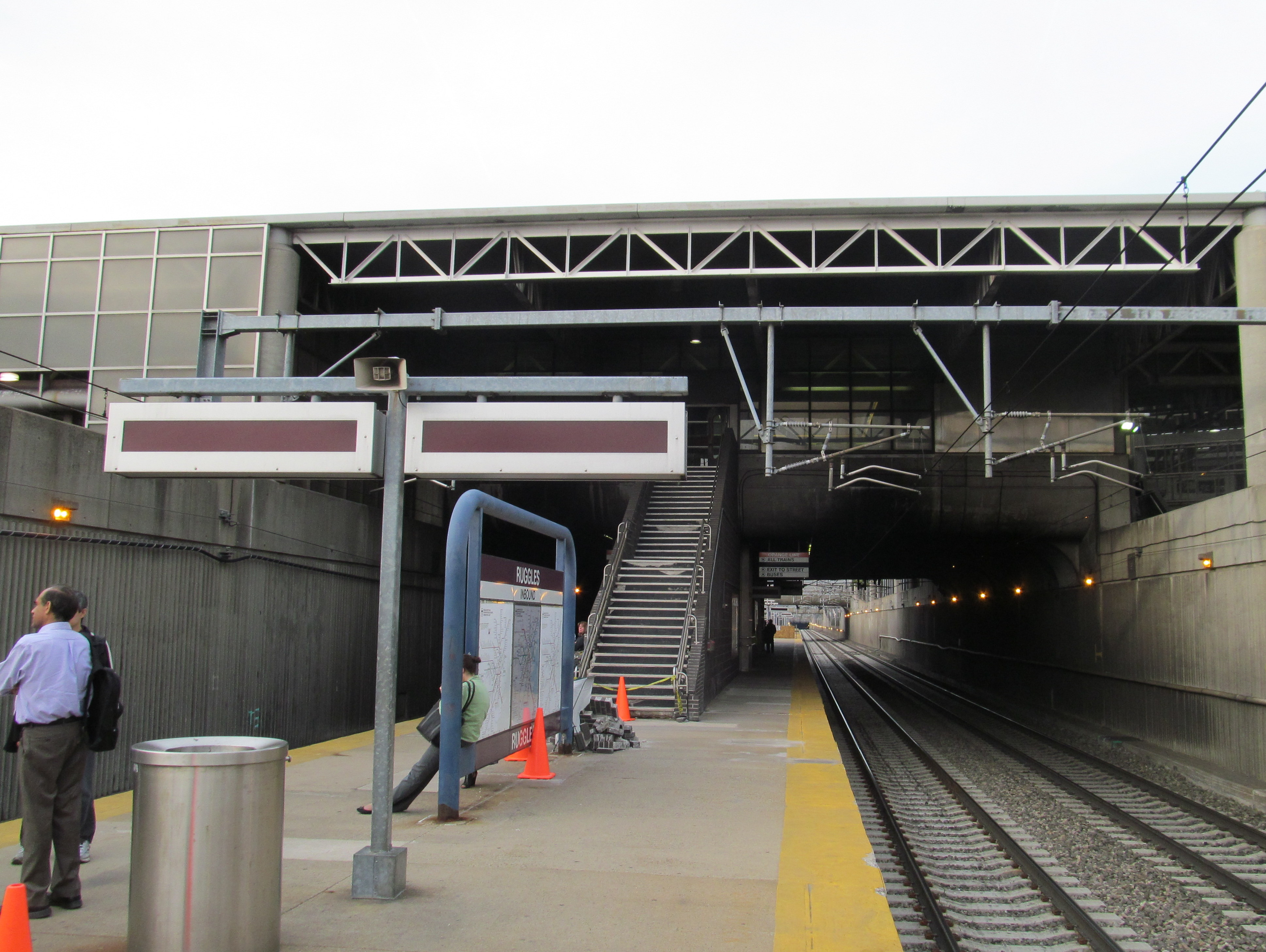
Commuter rail platform at Ruggles station

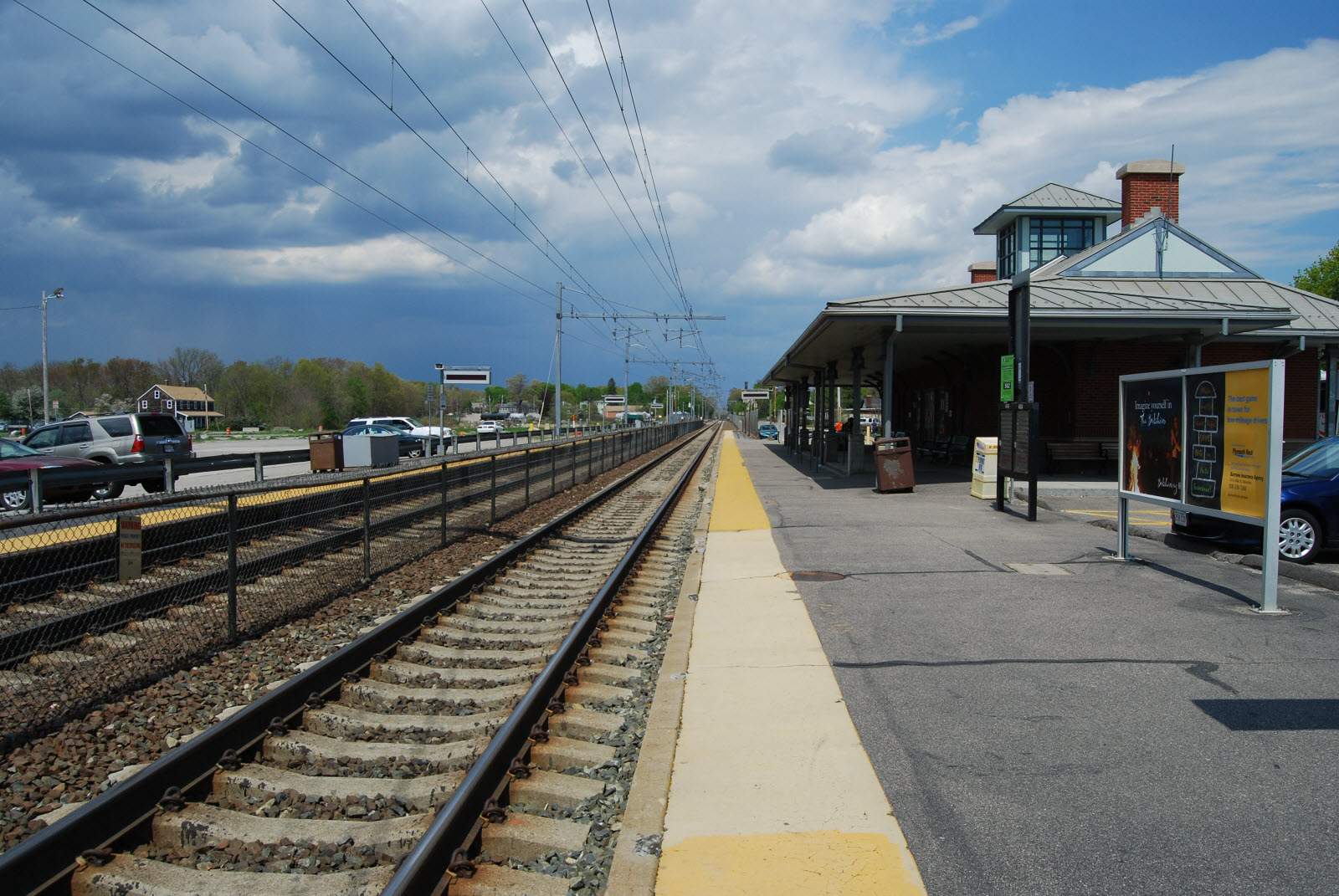
Platforms and station building at Mansfield

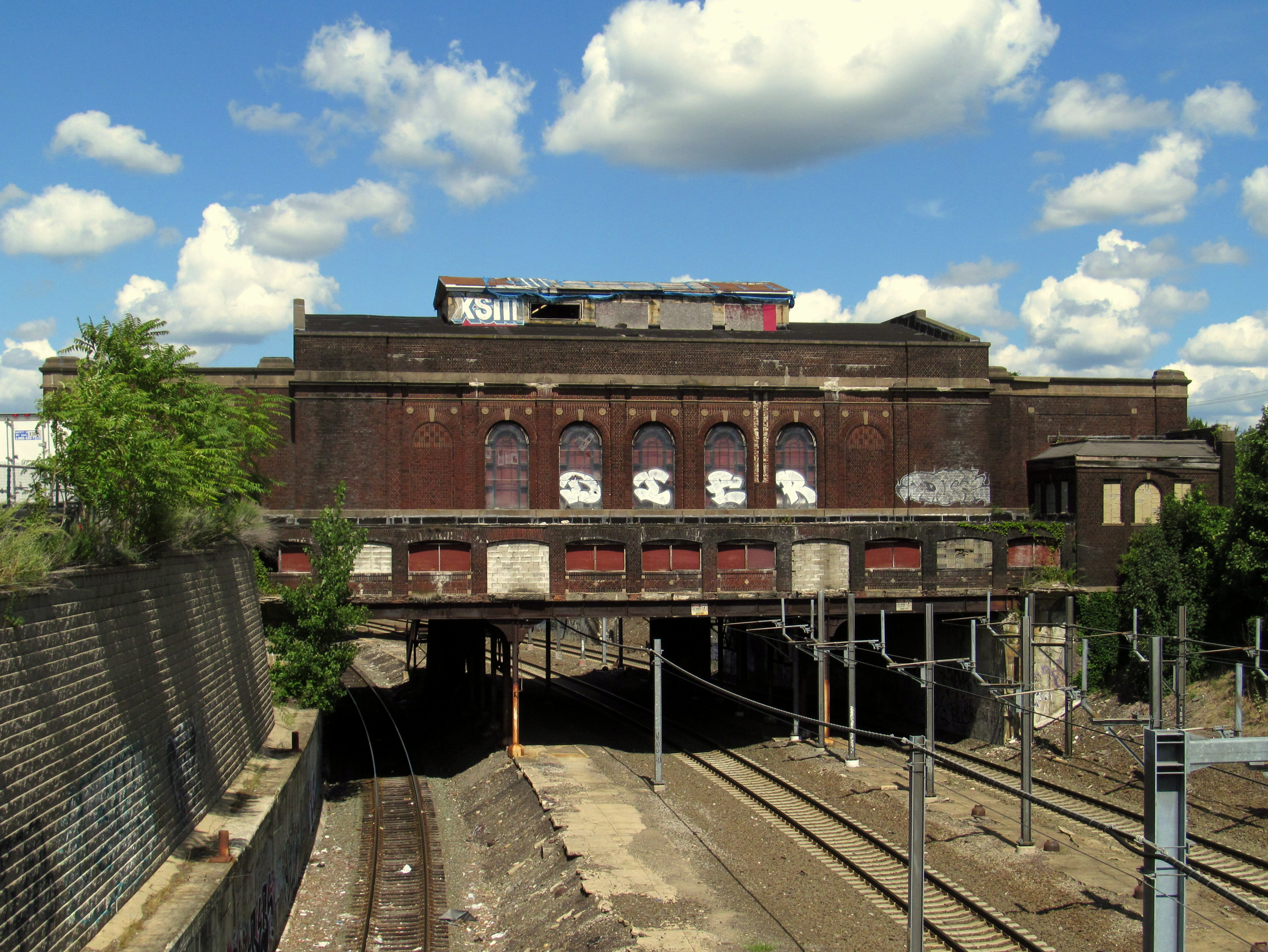
Former station at Pawtucket/Central Falls, last used in 1981

Fare zone	Location	Miles (km)	Station	Connections and notes
1A	Boston	0.0 (0.0)	South Station	Amtrak: Acela, Lake Shore Limited, Northeast Regional; MBTA Commuter Rail: Fairmount, Fall River/New Bedford, Framingham/Worcester, Franklin/Foxboro, Greenbush, Kingston, and Needham lines; CapeFlyer (seasonal); MBTA subway: Red Line; Silver Line (SL1, SL2, SL3, SL4); MBTA bus: 4, 7, 11; Intercity buses at South Station Bus Terminal
1A	Boston	1.2 (1.9)	Back Bay	Amtrak: Acela, Lake Shore Limited, Northeast Regional; MBTA Commuter Rail: Framingham/Worcester, Franklin/Foxboro, and Needham lines MBTA subway: Orange Line; MBTA bus: 10, 39
1A	Boston	2.2 (3.5)	Ruggles	MBTA Commuter Rail: Franklin/Foxboro and Needham lines MBTA subway: Orange Line; MBTA bus: 8, 15, 19, 22, 23, 28, 43, 44, 45, 47, 65, 85, CT3; Mission Hill Link
1A	Boston	5.0 (8.0)	Forest Hills	Limited service MBTA Commuter Rail: Franklin/Foxboro and Needham lines MBTA subway: Orange Line; MBTA bus: 16, 21, 30, 31, 32, 34, 34E, 35, 36, 37, 38, 39, 40, 42, 50, 51
	Boston	6.5 (10.5)	Mount Hope	Closed November 2, 1979
1	Boston	8.4 (13.5)	Hyde Park	MBTA Commuter Rail: Franklin/Foxboro Line; MBTA bus: 24, 32, 33, 50
2	Boston	9.5 (15.3)	Readville	MBTA Commuter Rail: Fairmount and Franklin/Foxboro lines MBTA bus: 32, 33
2	Westwood	11.4 (18.3)	Route 128	Amtrak: Acela, Northeast Regional
3	Canton	14.8 (23.8)	Canton Junction	MBTA bus: 716; Split with Stoughton Branch
4	Sharon	17.9 (28.8)	Sharon	
	Foxborough	23.0 (37.0)	East Foxboro	Closed November 1977
6	Mansfield	24.7 (39.8)	Mansfield	Blue Apple Bus
7	Attleboro	31.8 (51.2)	Attleboro	GATRA: 10, 12, 15, 16, 18
7	Attleboro	36.8 (59.2)	South Attleboro	Limited service GATRA: 11, 16; RIPTA: 1, 35
	Pawtucket, RI	39.0 (62.8)	Pawtucket–Central Falls	Closed February 19, 1981
8	Pawtucket, RI	39.5 (63.6)	Pawtucket/Central Falls	RIPTA: R-Line, 1, 71, 72, 73, 75, 76, 78, 80, QX
8	Providence, RI	43.6 (70.2)	Providence	Amtrak: Acela, Northeast Regional; RIPTA: R-Line, 3, 4, 50, 51, 54, 55, 56, 57, 58, 66, 72
9	Warwick, RI	51.9 (83.5)	T. F. Green Airport	RIPTA: 14
10	North Kingstown, RI	62.9 (101.2)	Wickford Junction	RIPTA: 14, 65x, 66
Closed station

=== Stoughton Branch ===
State	Fare zone	Location	Mile (km)	Station	Connections and notes
MA	3	Canton	14.8 (23.8)	Canton Junction	MBTA bus: 716; Splits from main line (Northeast Corridor)
MA	3	Canton	15.6 (25.1)	Canton Center	MBTA bus: 716
MA	4	Stoughton	18.9 (30.4)	Stoughton	BAT: 14
