= Canton Center station =

Rail station in Canton, Massachusetts, US

Canton Center
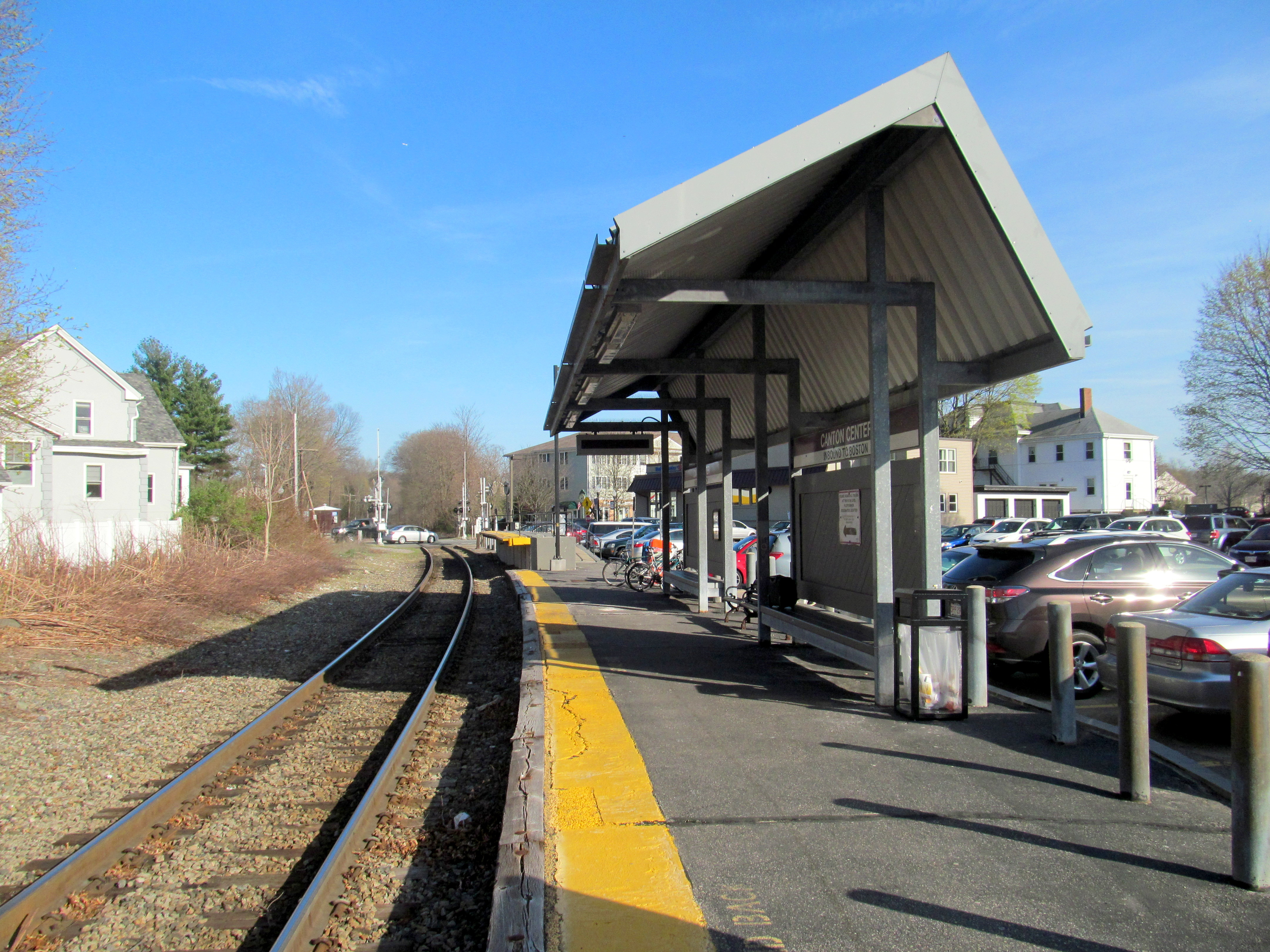
- Canton Center station in April 2016

General information
- Location: 710 Washington Street; Canton, Massachusetts
- Coordinates: 42.1571°N 71.1463°W
- Line: Stoughton Branch
- Platforms: 1 side platform
- Tracks: 1
- Connections: MBTA bus: 716

Construction
- Parking: 219 spaces
- Cycle facilities: 10 spaces
- Accessible: yes

Other information
- Fare zone: 3

History
- Opened: 1845
- Former names: South Canton, Canton

Passengers
- 2024: 334 daily boardings

Services
| Preceding station | MBTA | Following station |
|---|---|---|
| Stoughton Terminus | Providence/Stoughton Line | Canton Junction toward South Station |
Former services
| Preceding station | New York, New Haven and Hartford Railroad | Following station |
|---|---|---|
| Springdale toward Stoughton | Stoughton Branch | Canton Junction Terminus |
| Stoughton toward Fall River | Boston–Fall River | Canton Junction toward Boston |
| Stoughton toward New Bedford | Boston–New Bedford | Canton Junction toward Boston |
Location

Canton Center station is an MBTA Commuter Rail station in Canton, Massachusetts. It serves the Providence/Stoughton Line, including most Stoughton Branch service except for evening inbound trains. The station has 1 side platform on the south side of the track west of Washington Street; the platform has a mini-high section for accessibility.

== History ==
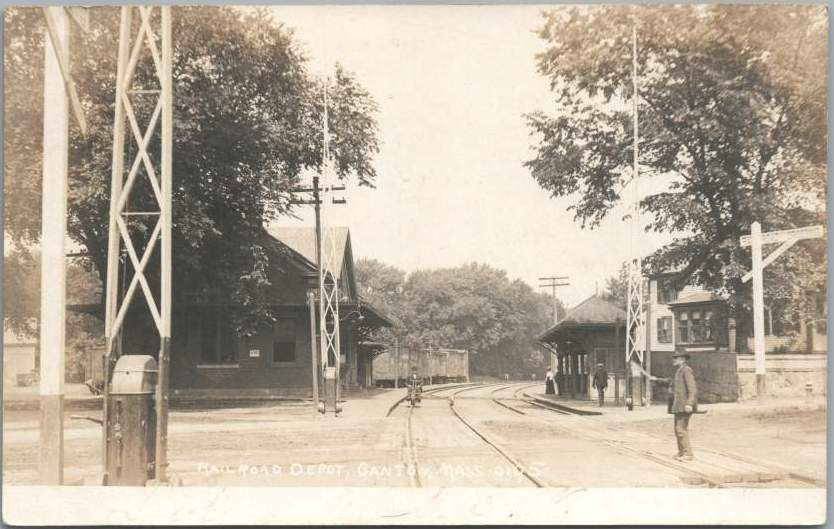
1907 postcard of Canton station

The Stoughton Branch Railroad opened in early 1845. The station near the village center was named South Canton to distinguish it from Canton station on the Boston and Providence Railroad mainline. Around 1879, the branch station was renamed Canton, while the mainline station became Canton Junction. The Old Colony Railroad constructed a new freight house at Canton in 1891.

Around 2001, the station was briefly proposed to be closed as part of the South Coast Rail project. The station is proposed to be reconstructed as part of Phase 2 of the since-modified project, which would extend the Stoughton Branch south to several South Coast cities. Under plans released in 2013, a second track would be added through the station to support increased bidirectional service; two 800-foot (240 m) low-level platforms would be built, each with a mini-high platform for accessibility. By 2024, with Phase 1 nearing completion, it was unclear whether Phase 2 would ever be constructed.
