= Stoughton station =

Rail station in Stoughton, Massachusetts, US

Stoughton
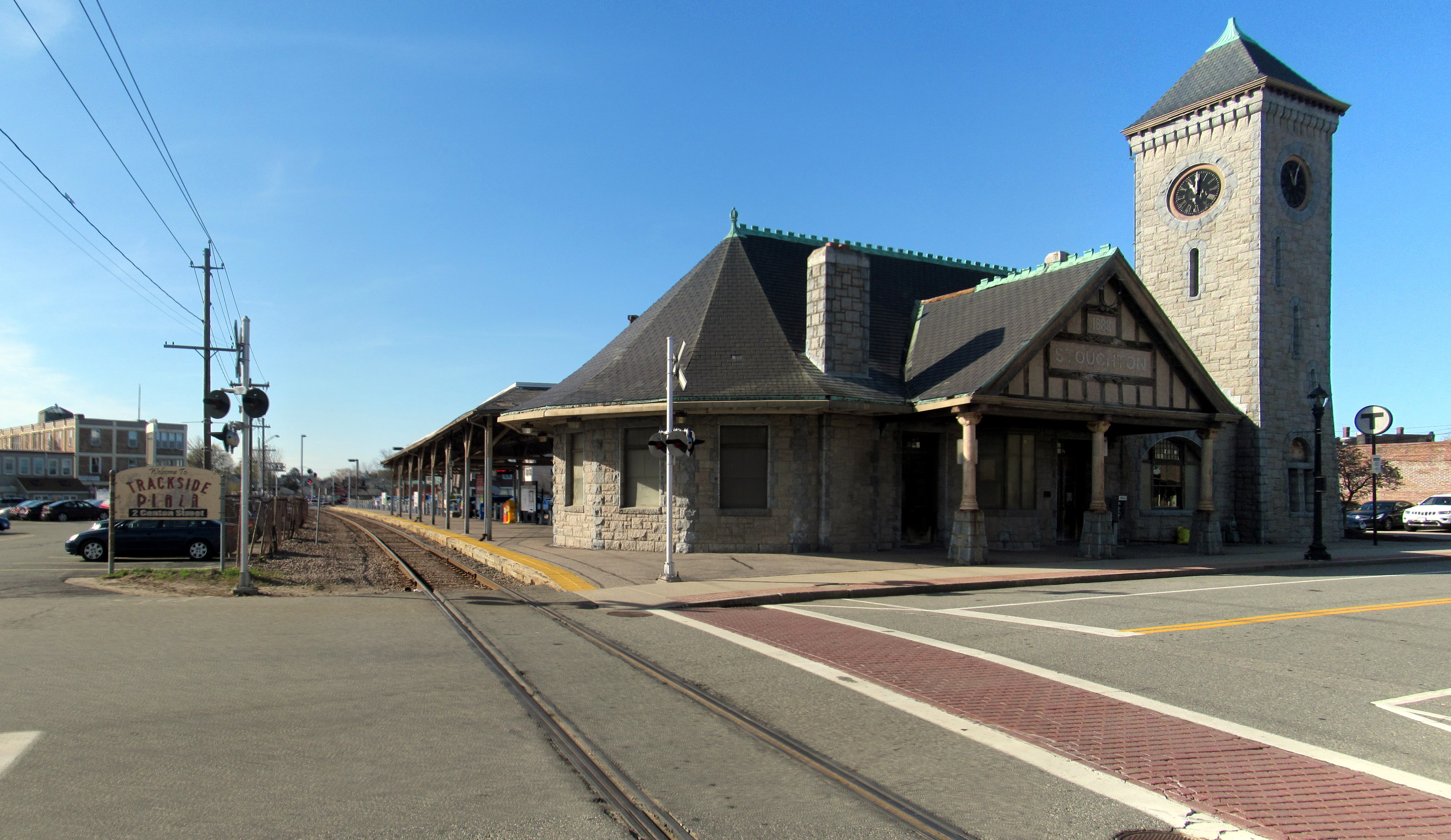
- 1888-built Stoughton station building in 2016

General information
- Location: 45 Wyman Street; Stoughton, Massachusetts, US
- Coordinates: 42.12391°N 71.10319°W
- Line: Stoughton Branch
- Platforms: 1 side platform
- Tracks: 1
- Connections: BAT: 14

Construction
- Parking: 333 spaces
- Cycle facilities: 6 spaces
- Accessible: Yes

Other information
- Fare zone: 4

History
- Opened: April 7, 1845
- Rebuilt: 1887–1888, 1977–1988
- Former names: Stoughton Central (c. 1888–November 1, 1896)

Passengers
- 2024: 766 daily boardings

Services
Preceding station	MBTA	Following station
Terminus	Providence/Stoughton Line	Canton Center toward South Station
Former services
Preceding station	New York, New Haven and Hartford Railroad	Following station
Terminus	Stoughton Branch	West Stoughton toward Canton Junction
North Easton toward Fall River	Boston–Fall River	Canton toward Boston
North Easton toward New Bedford	Boston–New Bedford	Canton toward Boston
Proposed services
Preceding station	MBTA	Following station
North Easton toward Battleship Cove or New Bedford	South Coast Rail Phase 2	Canton Center toward South Station
- Stoughton Railroad Station
- U.S. National Register of Historic Places
- Built: 1888
- Architect: Charles Brigham
- Architectural style: Romanesque Revival
- NRHP reference No.: 74000384
- Added to NRHP: January 21, 1974
Location

Stoughton station is an MBTA Commuter Rail station in downtown Stoughton, Massachusetts, United States. It is the terminus of the Stoughton Branch of the Providence/Stoughton Line. Stoughton has one platform (split across Wyman Street) serving one track; the platform has a mini-high section for accessibility. The granite Richardson Romanesque station building, designed by Charles Brigham, has a 62-foot (19 m) clock tower.

The Stoughton Branch Railroad opened from Canton – on the Boston and Providence Railroad (B&P) mainline – to Stoughton on April 7, 1845. The first two stations were destroyed that year by fire and wind. Stoughton was the terminal of the branch until 1855, and the terminal of passenger service from 1866 to around 1890. The present station building was constructed in 1887–1888; it was called Stoughton Central until 1896. The B&P was leased in 1888 by the Old Colony Railroad, which was in turn leased by the New York, New Haven and Hartford Railroad in 1893. Under the New Haven, the branch saw a mixture of service until 1958, when Stoughton became the terminal.

The Massachusetts Bay Transportation Authority purchased the Stoughton Branch and other lines in 1973. The station building was listed on the National Register of Historic Places in 1974. It was restored from 1977 to 1988, with the mini-high platform added. The station building closed again in 2009, prompting the town to acquire it a decade later with plans for restoration. The proposed but unfunded Phase 2 of the South Coast Rail project, would re-extend service from Stoughton to Fall River and New Bedford. Under that plan, which is opposed by the town, the station would be relocated south with full-length accessible platforms and a second track.

== Station design ==
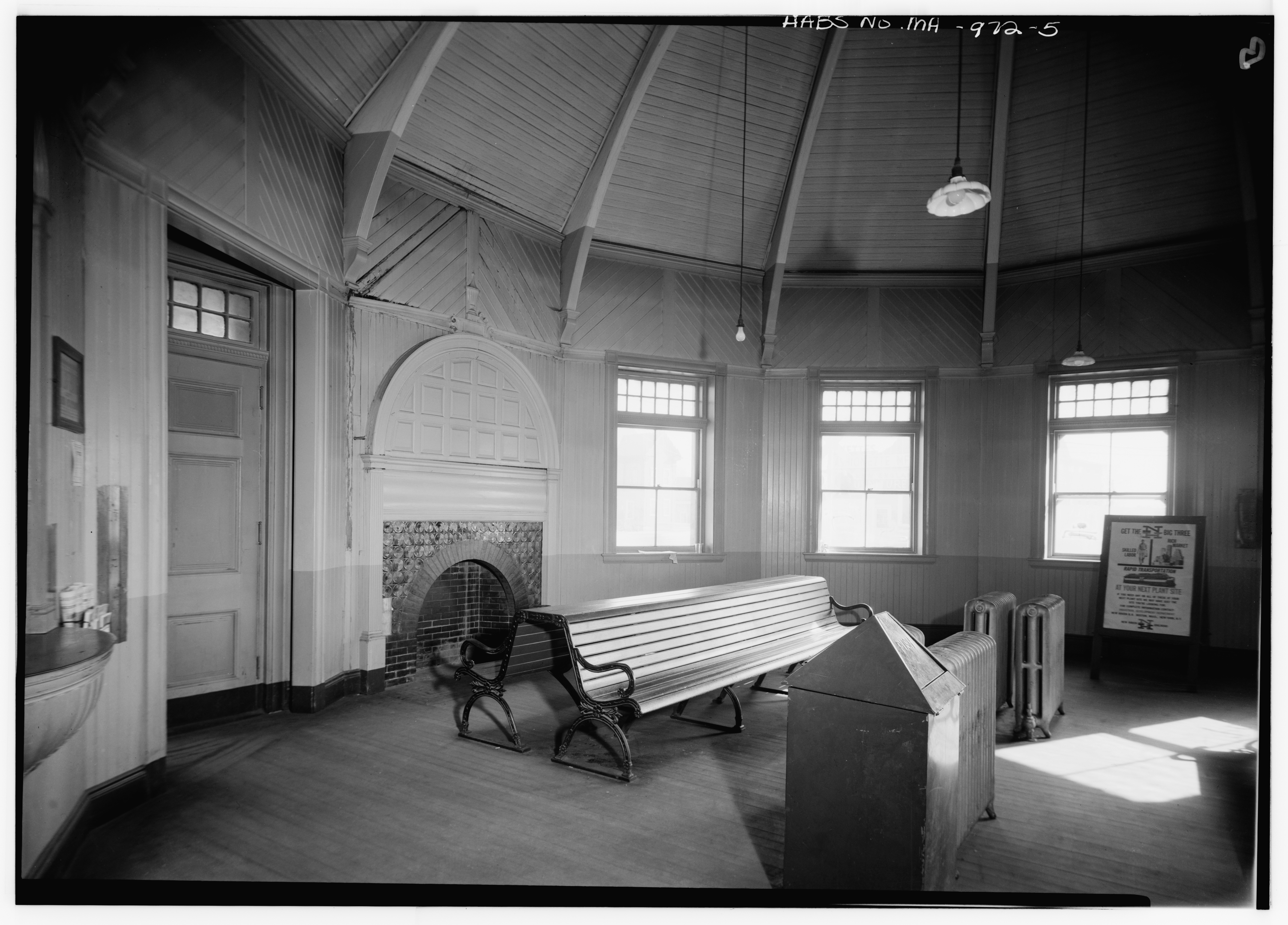
The waiting room interior in 1969

Stoughton station is located in downtown Stoughton about 400 feet (120 m) west of Washington Street (Route 138). The station is in the middle of a broad curve; the single track of the Stoughton Branch is aligned approximately northwest–southeast through the station. A low-level side platform is located on the northeast side of the track between the Porter Street and Wyman Street grade crossings. An additional section of platform with an accessible mini-high platform is located southeast of Wyman Street. At the south end of the platform, the single track splits into two to serve as a layover for trains. Parking lots are located on both sides of the tracks.

The Romanesque Revival station building is just north of the Wyman Street grade crossing. It measures 35.5 by 88 feet (10.8 m × 26.8 m) with the long side along Wyman Street. It is built of granite, arranged as random ashlar blocks, from the Myron Gilbert Quarry in Stoughton. The 62-foot (19 m)-tall, 15-foot (4.6 m)-square tower at the east corner houses four clock faces made by E. Howard & Co. A porte-cochere is located at the northeast end.

The southwest end of the station, originally the women's waiting room, is a dodecagon with half protruding from the rectangular form; the men's waiting room was at the northeast end. The waiting rooms had separate fireplaces and chimneys. The women's waiting room has wood trim that arches to the ceiling. The slate roof has copper coping. A portico over the entrance from Wyman Street is half-timbered. A wooden canopy, attached to the building, covers part of the platform.

== History ==
=== Old Colony and New Haven ===
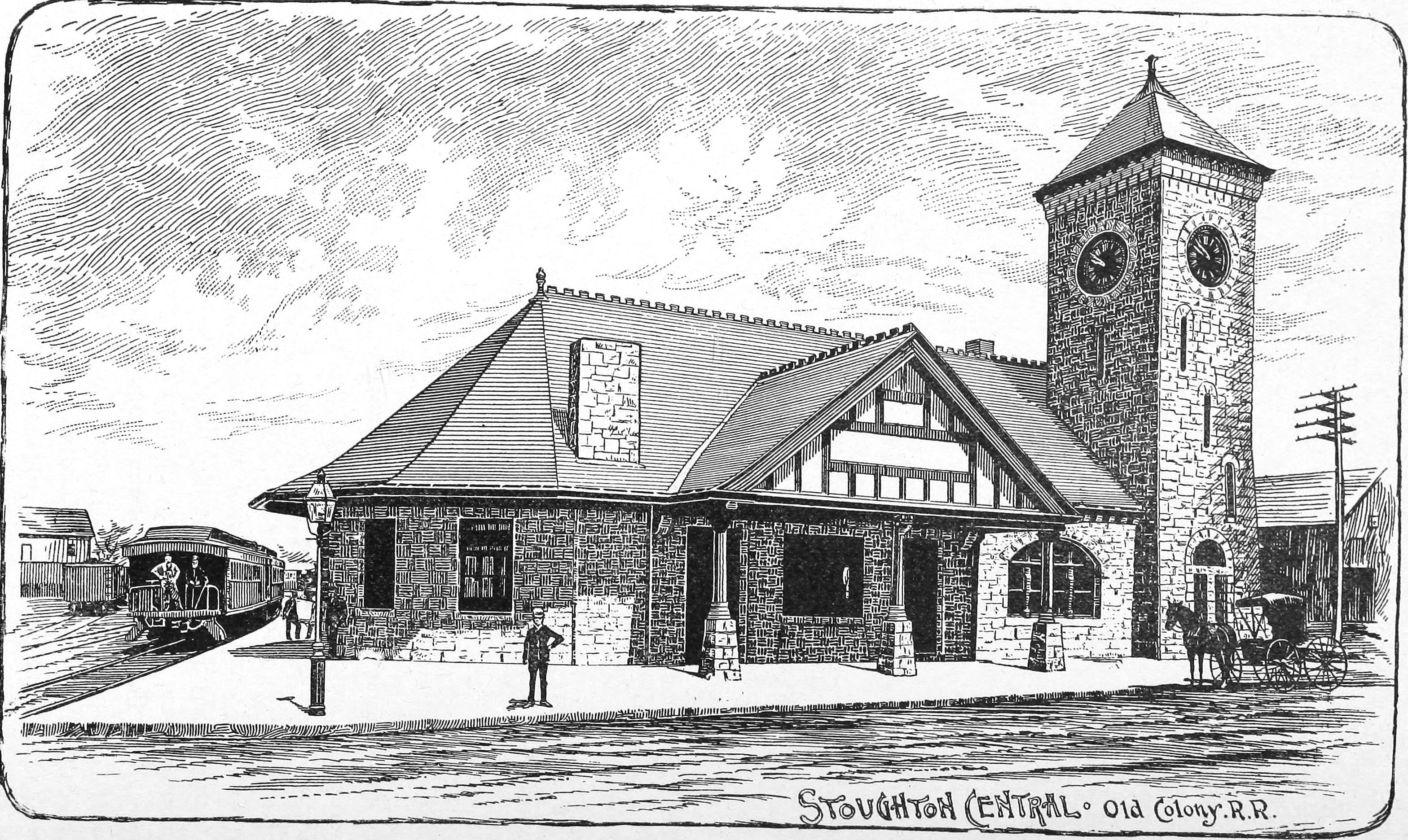
c. 1890 depiction of the station

The Stoughton Branch Railroad opened from Canton – on the Boston and Providence Railroad (B&P) mainline – to Stoughton on April 7, 1845. The original Stoughton station was a wooden structure at Railroad Avenue. It was destroyed by a fire on June 20, 1845; its replacement was destroyed by wind on October 13, 1845, while being built. The third station building, completed in 1846, was built of brick. It included an engine house and freight house in the same building.

The Stoughton Branch was extended south to North Easton by the Easton Branch Railroad on May 16, 1855. The Dighton and Somerset Railroad opened its line between Somerset Junction (north of Fall River) and Braintree Highlands on September 24, 1866. It used the Easton Branch Railroad between North Easton and Stoughton Junction (south of Stoughton); passenger service ended between Stoughton and Stoughton Junction.

The third station was replaced by a granite station designed by Charles Brigham – his first work as an independent architect. Construction began on May 27, 1887, and the new station opened in March 1888. The Old Colony acquired the B&P in 1888, consolidating all the railways in southeastern Massachusetts under a single owner. The company routed some service to the South Coast cities of Fall River and New Bedford trains via Stoughton at times. The Old Colony was leased by the New York, New Haven and Hartford Railroad in 1893. The station was called Stoughton Central beginning in 1888 to distinguish it from the station on the Dighton and Somerset. On November 1, 1896, Stoughton Central station became simply Stoughton, while the other station became South Stoughton.

By 1915, the station had two through tracks plus two stub-end tracks. A freight house was located across the tracks from the station, while a four-stall engine house and turntable were southeast of Wyman Street. The New Haven resumed running South Coast trains via Stoughton during and after World War I. All service on the Dighton and Somerset line was routed via Stoughton after around 1924. On August 4, 1924, a Boston-bound express train derailed just south of the station and damaged its walls. The wreck was caused by two boys, aged seven and nine, who placed spikes on the rails, explaining later that they did this because they "just wanted to see a real train wreck". By 1927, almost all service to New Bedford and Fall River ran via Stoughton.

South Coast service was rerouted via Mansfield in 1937 during the early stages of the 88 stations case, leaving the Stoughton branch with mostly shuttle trains to Canton Junction. Some South Coast service was routed via Stoughton in 1950, and all service after 1955. That remaining service ended on September 5, 1958, as the New Haven cut its unprofitable Old Colony Division. Stoughton Branch service remained as far as Stoughton because the branch had been associated with the B&P, which had been separated from the Old Colony by the New Haven.

=== MBTA era ===
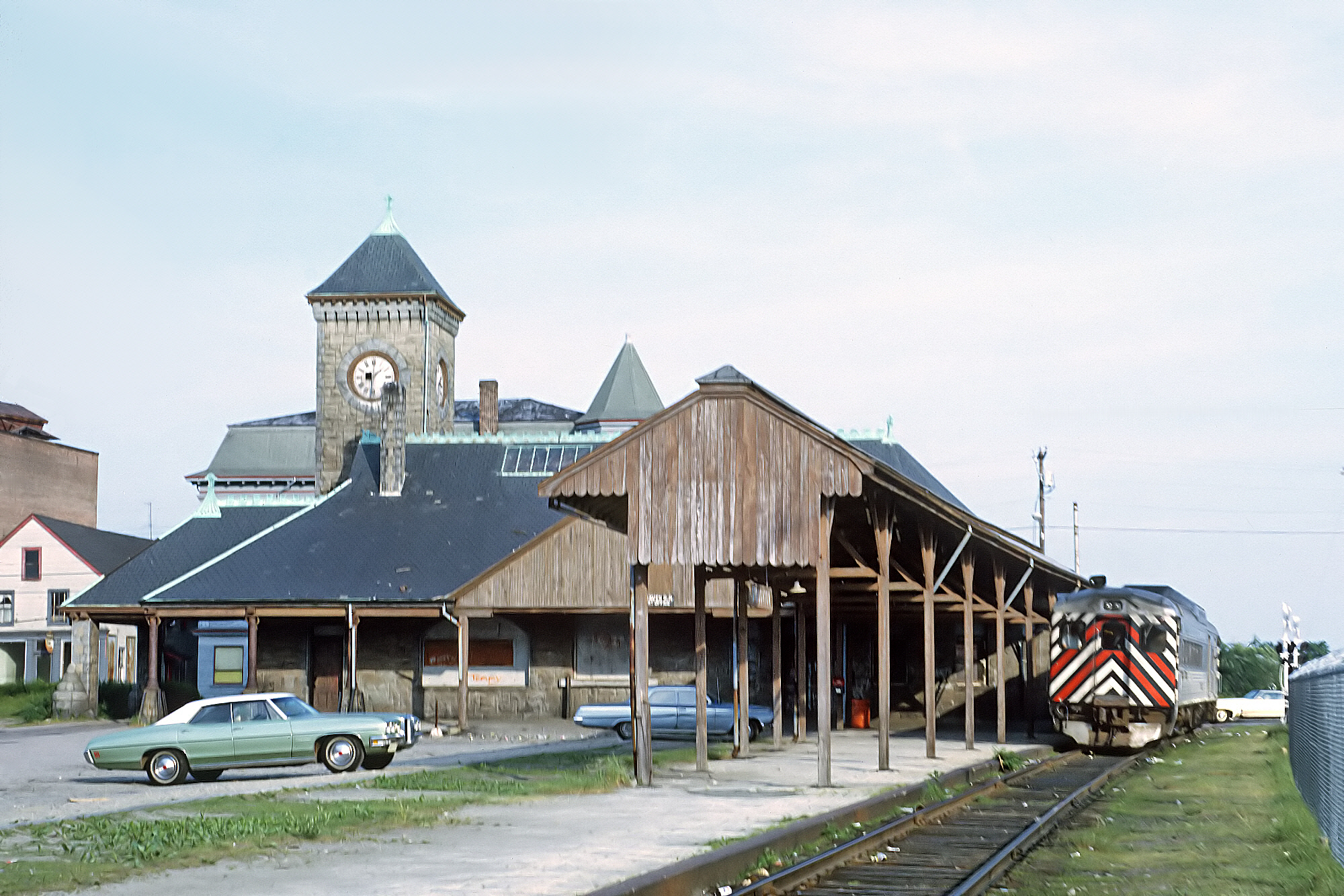
A Penn Central train at Stoughton in 1971

The Massachusetts Bay Transportation Authority began subsidizing some commuter service in 1965; Stoughton Branch service was not subsidized because the railroad did not have federal permission to discontinue it. The New Haven folded into Penn Central at the end of 1968. The MBTA purchased most of Penn Central's Boston commuter lines, including the Stoughton Branch and the ex-Dighton and Somerset as far as Taunton, on January 27, 1973. Penn Central continued to operate the service. Penn Central merged into Conrail on April 1, 1976. The MBTA began subsidizing Stoughton service on September 28, 1976; it was eventually designated as part of the Providence/Stoughton Line.

On March 12, 1977, the Boston and Maine Railroad began operating the southside commuter rail lines, including the Providence/Stoughton Line – the first of several contract operators for the service. Beginning on March 31, 1977, the town of Stoughton began contributing to the subsidy for its service. This subsidy was later taken up by the Brockton Area Transit Authority (BAT). Sunday service on the Stoughton Branch was added on July 11, 1992 – the first such service on the branch in decades – but all weekend service on the branch ended on February 14, 1993.

By 1967, Stoughton station was the only remaining example in the area of a terminal station with a clock tower. (Note: Several train stations with clock towers remain in Massachusetts, including those at Athol, Leominster Center, Nantasket, and Swampscott, but none were terminals.) The station was threatened by redevelopment plans in the late 1960s and early 1970s. Stoughton station was listed on the National Register of Historic Places on January 21, 1974, as Stoughton Railroad Station. That year, the town created a committee to plan restoration of the station. Some work began in 1975, but was put on hold until a lease with the MBTA was signed in 1977. Restoration work resumed in July 1977 and continued through the late 1980s at a cost exceeding $1 million. A coffee shop opened in the building in 1981. The MBTA and BAT added the accessible mini-high platform and 100 additional parking spaces in 1988. After the renovations, there was not continued maintenance, and the building again began to deteriorate.

The station building was closed to passengers on May 1, 2009, when a vendor ended its arrangements to sell MBTA tickets. In 2010, town officials began talks with the MBTA about leasing and renovating the building. The MBTA listed the building for sale for $350,000 in May 2012 after the town declined to bring a purchase to a town meeting, but withdrew the listing that July after objections from the town. In November 2015, town residents approved $250,000 for purchase of the station and $350,000 for exterior renovations. The state legislature limited the sale price to $175,000 in 2017. In December 2018, the state announced a $75,000 grant for further restoration of the station building. The town ultimately acquired the building in mid-2019 at a cost of $175,000. The station was used in the 2019 film Little Women as a stand-in for Concord station.

=== South Coast Rail ===
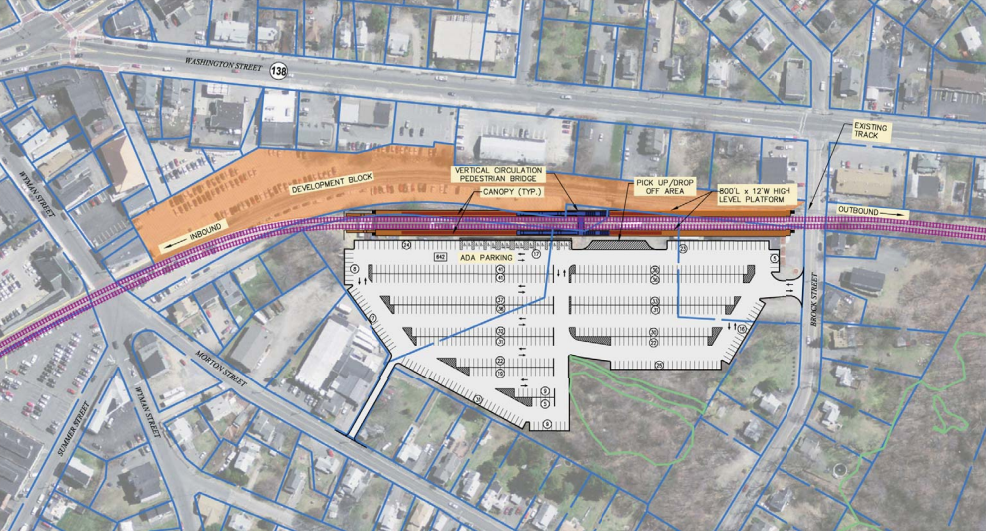
2013 plans for reconstruction of the station

Planning for South Coast Rail service to Fall River and New Bedford began in the 1980s. By 1988, the MBTA was tentatively planning to extend service to Taunton via Stoughton. A 1990 study found that the Stoughton route would be most viable for South Coast service. A 1995 study found that routes via Stoughton or Attleboro would be feasible; it recommended a shorter Stoughton Branch extension to North Easton. The MBTA briefly pursued plans for the Attleboro route, but a 1997 study again recommended the Stoughton route. Planning for the Stoughton route continued until it was suspended in 2003.

Planning resumed in 2005. A 2009 alternatives analysis report again recommended the Stoughton route. Plans released that year called for a second track to be added through Stoughton station to support increased bidirectional service. The two new platforms would be located fully south of Wyman Street on a curve; they would have 45-foot (14 m)-long mini-high platform at their southern ends. Stoughton officials indicated that they would seek for a tunnel to be built through the downtown area — as was done in Hingham on the Greenbush Line — with the station moved underground. Under 2013 plans, the tracks would be moved slightly west south of Wyman Street, with full-length high-level platforms built a block south at Brock Street, connected with an overhead pedestrian bridge. A new parking area with nearly twice the number of spaces would be built; the old right-of-way and parking areas would be redeveloped.

In June 2016, the MBTA announced that the project cost had been significantly increased, with completion not expected until 2030. This caused officials to consider alternate plans, including an interim service to New Bedford via Middleborough. In March 2017, the state announced a revised plan intended to provide service sooner. Phase 1 would follow the Middleborough route and open in 2024 with service to both Fall River and New Bedford. Phase 2 would follow the Stoughton route (including electrification) and open in 2029. Later that year, the Phase 2 date was revised to 2030. The town of Stoughton opposed any Stoughton routing because it would increase rail traffic though grade crossings in downtown Stoughton. By 2024, with Phase 1 nearing completion, it was unclear whether Phase 2 would ever be constructed.

== See also ==
- National Register of Historic Places listings in Norfolk County, Massachusetts
- List of Old Colony Railroad stations
