= Canton Junction station =

Railway station in Canton, Massachusetts, US

Canton Junction
- Canton Junction station in 2026

General information
- Location: Beaumont Street at Sherman Street; Canton, Massachusetts
- Coordinates: 42.1628°N 71.1537°W
- Lines: Attleboro Line (Northeast Corridor); Stoughton Branch
- Platforms: 2 side platforms 1 island platform
- Tracks: 2 (Northeast Corridor); 2 (Stoughton Branch)
- Connections: MBTA bus: 716

Construction
- Parking: 764 spaces ($4.00 fee)
- Accessible: Yes

Other information
- Fare zone: 3

History
- Opened: 1835
- Rebuilt: 1892
- Former names: Canton

Passengers
- 2024: 1,105 daily boardings

Services
Preceding station	MBTA	Following station
Sharon toward Wickford Junction	Providence/Stoughton Line	Route 128 toward South Station
Canton Center toward Stoughton	Providence/Stoughton Line	Route 128 toward South Station
Former services
Preceding station	MBTA	Following station
Sharon toward Foxboro	Foxboro event service 1989–1994	Route 128 toward South Station
Preceding station	New York, New Haven and Hartford Railroad	Following station
Sharon toward New Haven	Shore Line	Route 128 toward Boston
Canton toward Stoughton	Stoughton Branch	Terminus
Canton toward Fall River	Boston–Fall River	Route 128 toward Boston
Canton toward New Bedford	Boston–Fall River	Route 128 toward Boston
Proposed services
Preceding station	MBTA	Following station
Canton Center toward Battleship Cove or New Bedford	South Coast Rail Phase 2 (2030)	Route 128 toward South Station
Location

Canton Junction station is an MBTA Commuter Rail station in Canton, Massachusetts. It serves the Providence/Stoughton Line, and is planned for future service on the South Coast Rail line. It is located slightly north of the Canton Viaduct and west of downtown Canton.

At Canton Junction, the Stoughton Branch of the Providence/Stoughton Line splits from the Northeast Corridor and runs southeast to Stoughton, Massachusetts. The Providence section of the line follows the Northeast Corridor south to Providence, Rhode Island and beyond.

== History ==
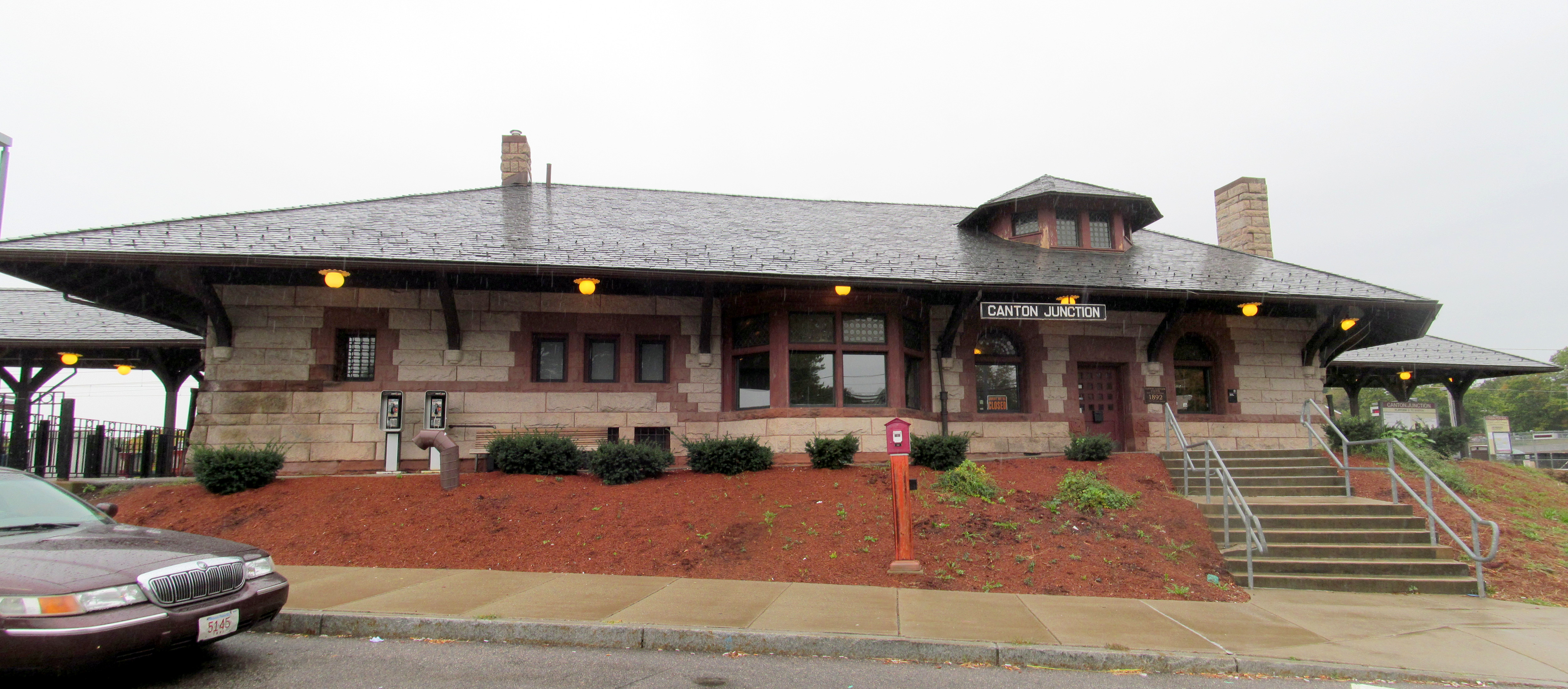
The 1893-built station building

Canton station opened with the Boston and Providence Railroad in 1835; the Stoughton Branch Railroad opened in early 1845. Around 1879, South Canton station was renamed Canton to reflect its position nearer the village center, while Canton station was renamed Canton Junction.

The current station building was designed by Bradford Lee Gilbert in the Richardsonian Romanesque style. Construction was begun by the Old Colony Railroad in 1892. It became part of the New York, New Haven and Hartford Railroad in March 1893; the new station opened on April 19.

From 1989 to 1994, Boston–Foxboro trains for events at Foxboro Stadium operated over the Northeast Corridor, with intermediate stops including Canton Junction. Boston–Foxboro service was rerouted over the Franklin Line in 1995.

The massive footbridge, built around 2000, showed significant rust and damage to concrete by 2015. Keolis (the commuter rail contract operator) began major repairs on the footbridge in 2016; however, the company failed to obtain the proper building permits. Construction was suspended in March 2017 with the western ramp and stairs still closed; passengers had to detour on foot over the Spaulding Street bridge to access the Providence-bound platform and the Jackson Street parking lot. Construction resumed in July 2017 and was completed in August.
