= Fitchburg Secondary =

Railway line in Massachusetts

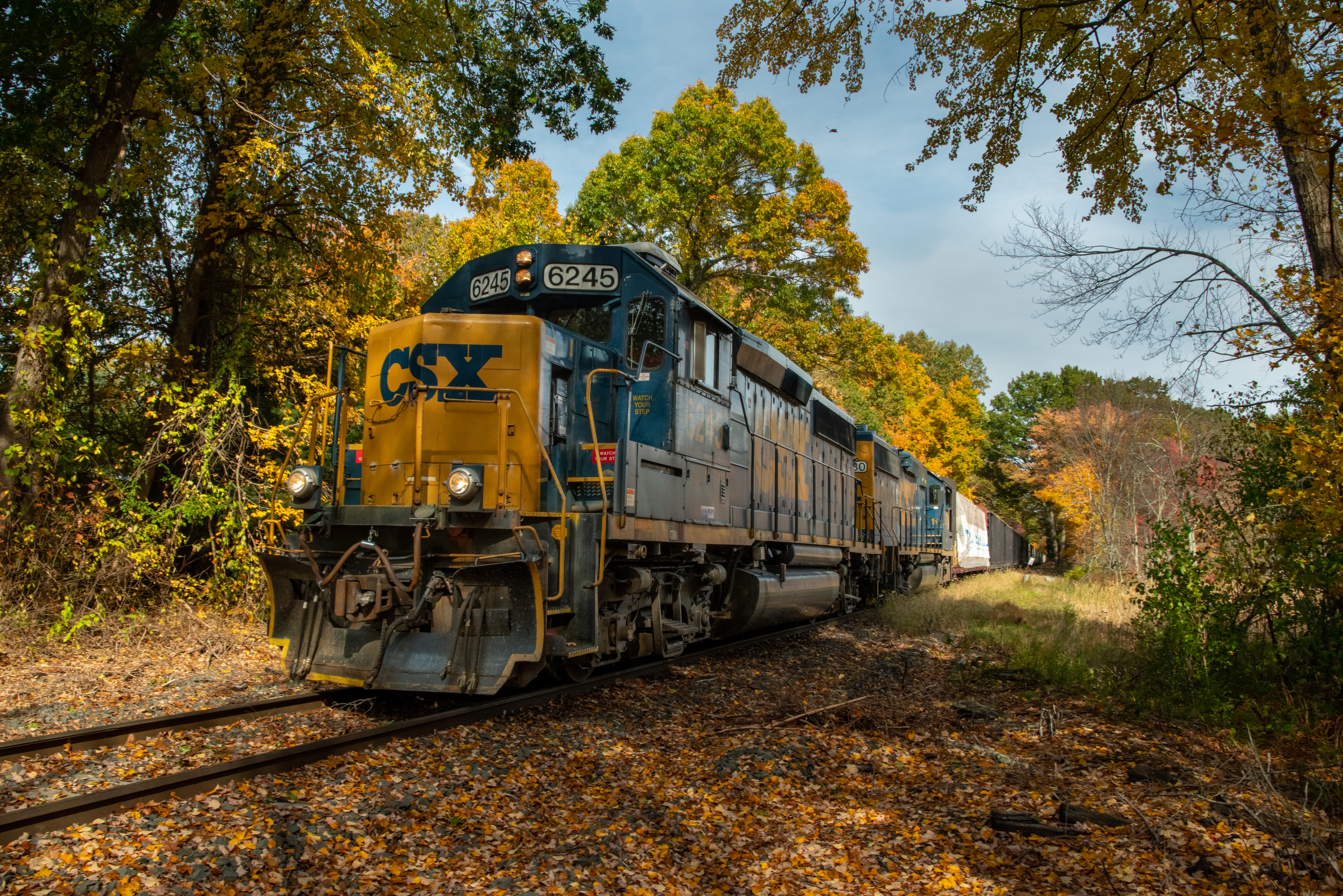
CSX train B724 on the Fitchburg Secondary in Southborough, MA

The Fitchburg Subdivision is a railroad line owned by CSX Transportation in the U.S. state of Massachusetts. The line runs from Fitchburg southeast to Framingham Center along a former New York, New Haven and Hartford Railroad line. Its south end is at the Boston Subdivision; the MBTA's Framingham Secondary continues southeast from Framingham.

== History ==
The part from Fitchburg south to Pratt Junction (in Sterling) opened in 1850 as part of the Fitchburg and Worcester Railroad. At the other end, the Boston and Worcester Railroad opened a branch from Framingham northwest to Framingham Center in 1849. The Agricultural Branch Railroad opened in 1855 from Framingham Center west to Northborough and in 1866 to Pratts Junction. The entire line became part of the NYNH&H and Conrail through leases, mergers, and takeovers, and was assigned to CSX in the 1999 breakup of Conrail.

Approximately 105 million gross ton-miles were moved over the Fitchburg Secondary between Framingham and Leominster in 2019.

== See also ==
- List of CSX Transportation lines
