= Taunton and Middleborough Railroad =

Map

The Taunton and Middleborough Railroad was a railroad in Massachusetts. It was incorporated in 1848 to connect the Taunton Branch Railroad in Weir Village, Taunton with the Fall River Railroad and newly built Cape Cod Branch Railroad in Middleborough through the town of Raynham. In 1853, the railroad changed its name to the Middleborough and Taunton Railroad.

On July 1, 1873, the railroad merged with the Taunton Branch Railroad and the New Bedford and Taunton Railroad to form the New Bedford Railroad, linking the line with the deep-water whaling port of New Bedford. The merger caught the attention of the Boston, Clinton and Fitchburg Railroad, which had leased the Mansfield and Framingham Railroad that connected its terminus in Framingham with the northern end of the Taunton Branch Railroad just six months earlier on January 1, 1873. Less than a year later, on February 2, 1874, the New Bedford Railroad was leased for fifty years to the Boston, Clinton and Fitchburg Railroad, and two months after the lease was signed, on April 8, 1874, the Legislature of Massachusetts authorized the sale of the former Middleborough and Taunton Railroad to the Old Colony Railroad.

In 1893, the Old Colony Railroad was leased to the New York, New Haven and Hartford Railroad. By the 1960s, the New York, New Haven and Hartford Railroad, like many railroads, was struggling to stay solvent in the face of increased competition from alternate modes of transportation, and so in 1961 it petitioned to be included in the newly formed Penn Central Transportation Company. On December 31, 1968 all of its properties were purchased by Penn Central. Penn Central, however, soon went bankrupt, and on April 1, 1976 it was taken over by Conrail. On August 22, 1998, the Surface Transportation Board approved the buyout of Conrail by CSX and Norfolk Southern, with the former assuming control of the former Taunton and Middleborough Railroad line and continuing operations along its tracks to this day.

== See also ==
- Fall River Branch Railroad
- Fitchburg and Worcester Railroad
- Boston and Albany Railroad
- Boston and Providence Railroad
- Framingham and Lowell Railroad
