= Boston, Clinton, Fitchburg and New Bedford Railroad =

Former railroad in Massachusetts

Map

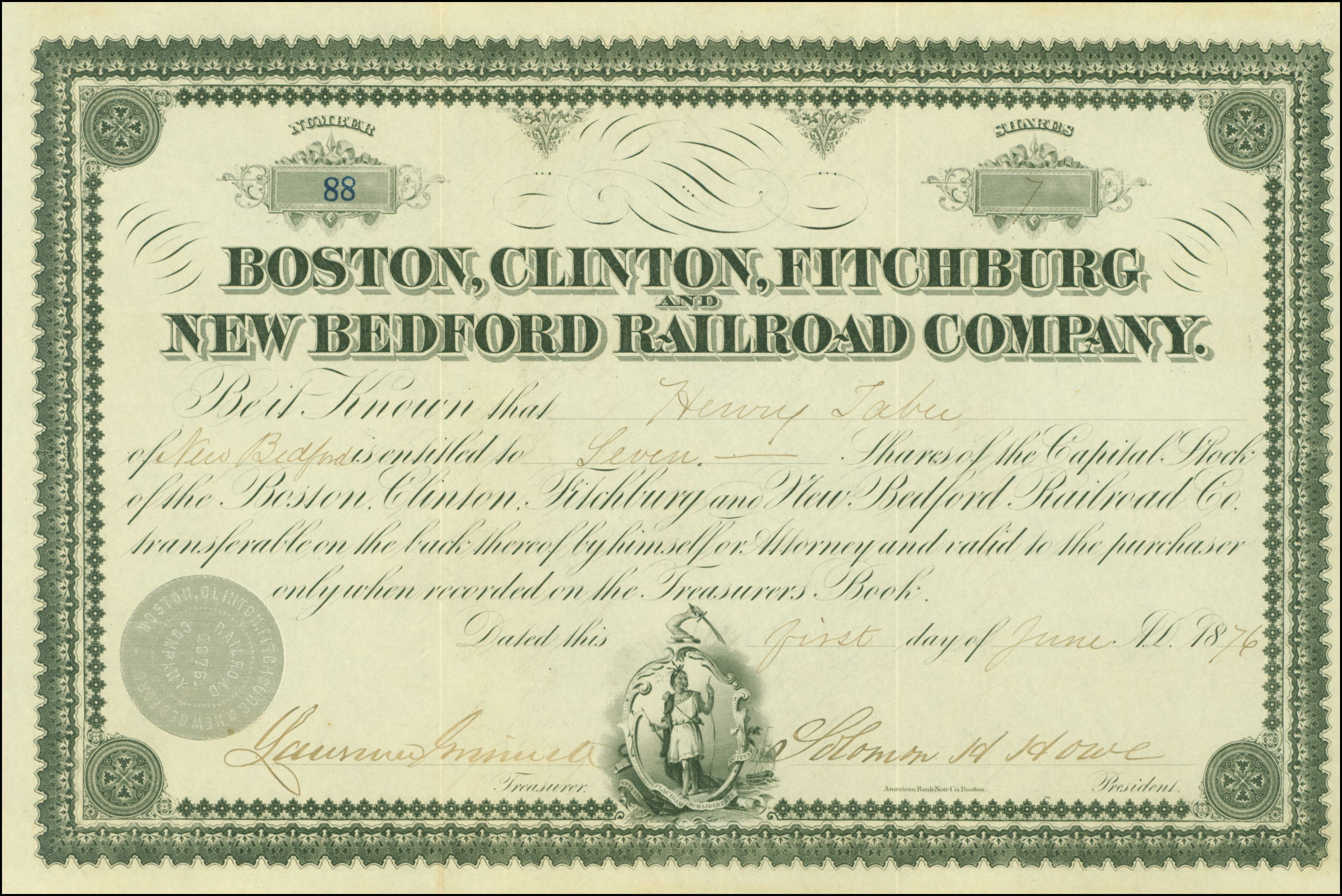
Share of the Boston, Clinton, Fitchburg and New Bedford Railroad Company, issued 1. June 1876

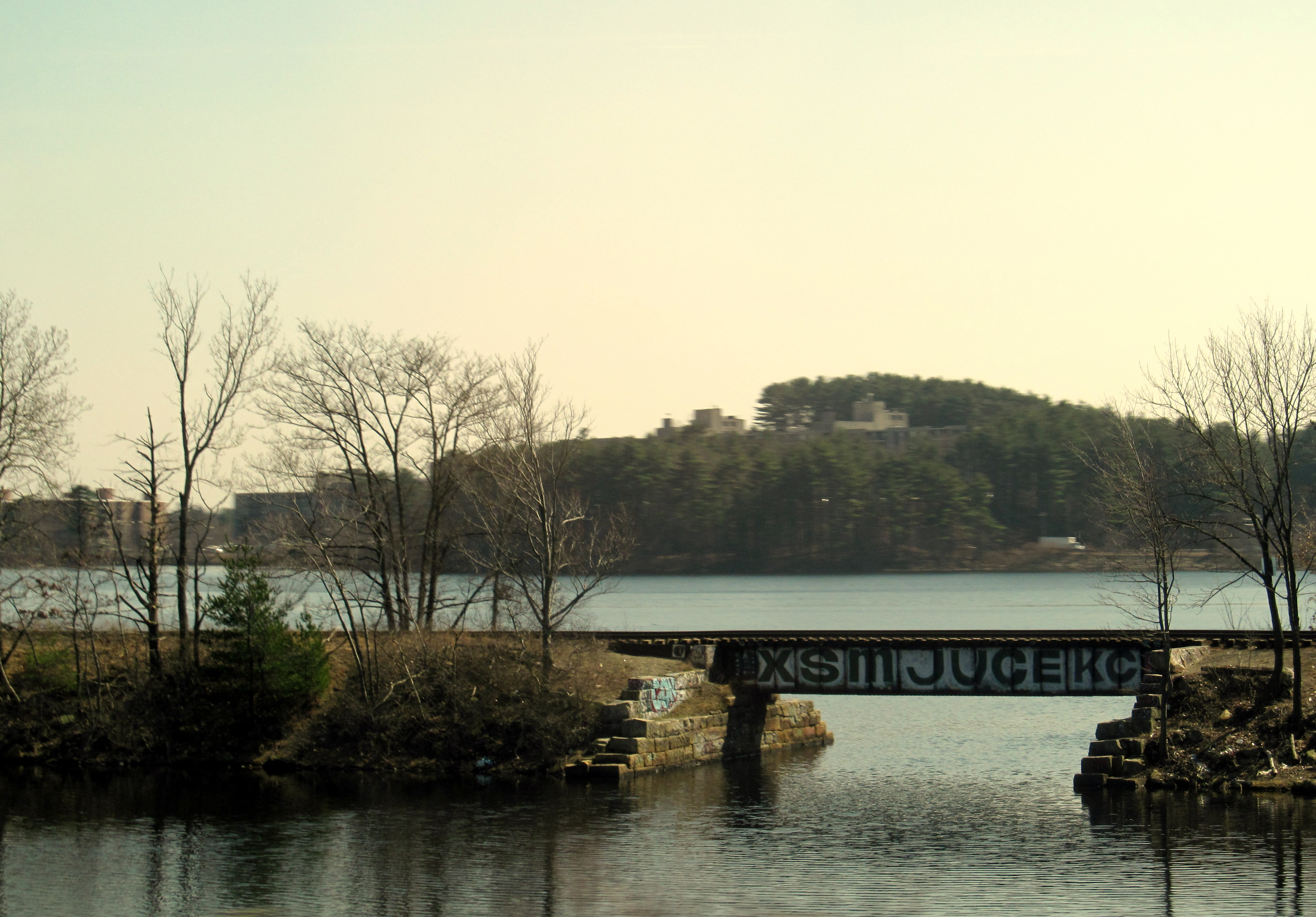
An arm of the Boston, Clinton and Fitchburg Railroad over Foss Reservoir in Framingham

The Boston, Clinton, Fitchburg and New Bedford Railroad was a railroad in Massachusetts. It was formed on June 1, 1876, when the Boston, Clinton and Fitchburg Railroad merged with the New Bedford Railroad. The Boston, Clinton and Fitchburg Railroad connected with the key railroad hubs of Worcester, Framingham, and Ayer, as well as several important industrial towns such as Fitchburg and Lowell, with the latter coming through a lease of the Framingham and Lowell Railroad. The New Bedford Railroad linked Framingham with New Bedford, which was a key deep-water port.

In 1879, the Boston, Clinton, Fitchburg and New Bedford Railroad was leased to the Old Colony Railroad, but on October 1 of that same year it still extended its lease of the Framingham and Lowell Railroad to 998 years. On September 10, 1881, the Framingham and Lowell Railroad was deeded on execution sale to the Boston, Clinton, Fitchburg, and New Bedford Railroad and renamed to the Lowell and Framingham Railroad Company. The sale resulted in the railroad's largest network with 126.2 miles of track system-wide.

On March 5, 1883, the Boston, Clinton, Fitchburg and New Bedford Railroad was outright consolidated into the Old Colony network. In 1893, the Old Colony Railroad was leased to the New York, New Haven and Hartford Railroad. The line last had regular passenger service in 1958, except for a return of New York to Cape Cod service ending in 1964.

By the 1960s, the New York, New Haven and Hartford Railroad, like many railroads, was struggling to stay solvent in the face of increased competition from alternate modes of transportation, and so in 1961 it petitioned to be included in the newly formed Penn Central Transportation Company. On December 31, 1968 all of its properties were purchased by Penn Central. Penn Central, however, soon went bankrupt, and on April 1, 1976 it was taken over by Conrail. On August 22, 1998, the Surface Transportation Board approved the buyout of Conrail by CSX and Norfolk Southern, with the former assuming control of the former Boston, Clinton, Fitchburg and New Bedford Railroad network.

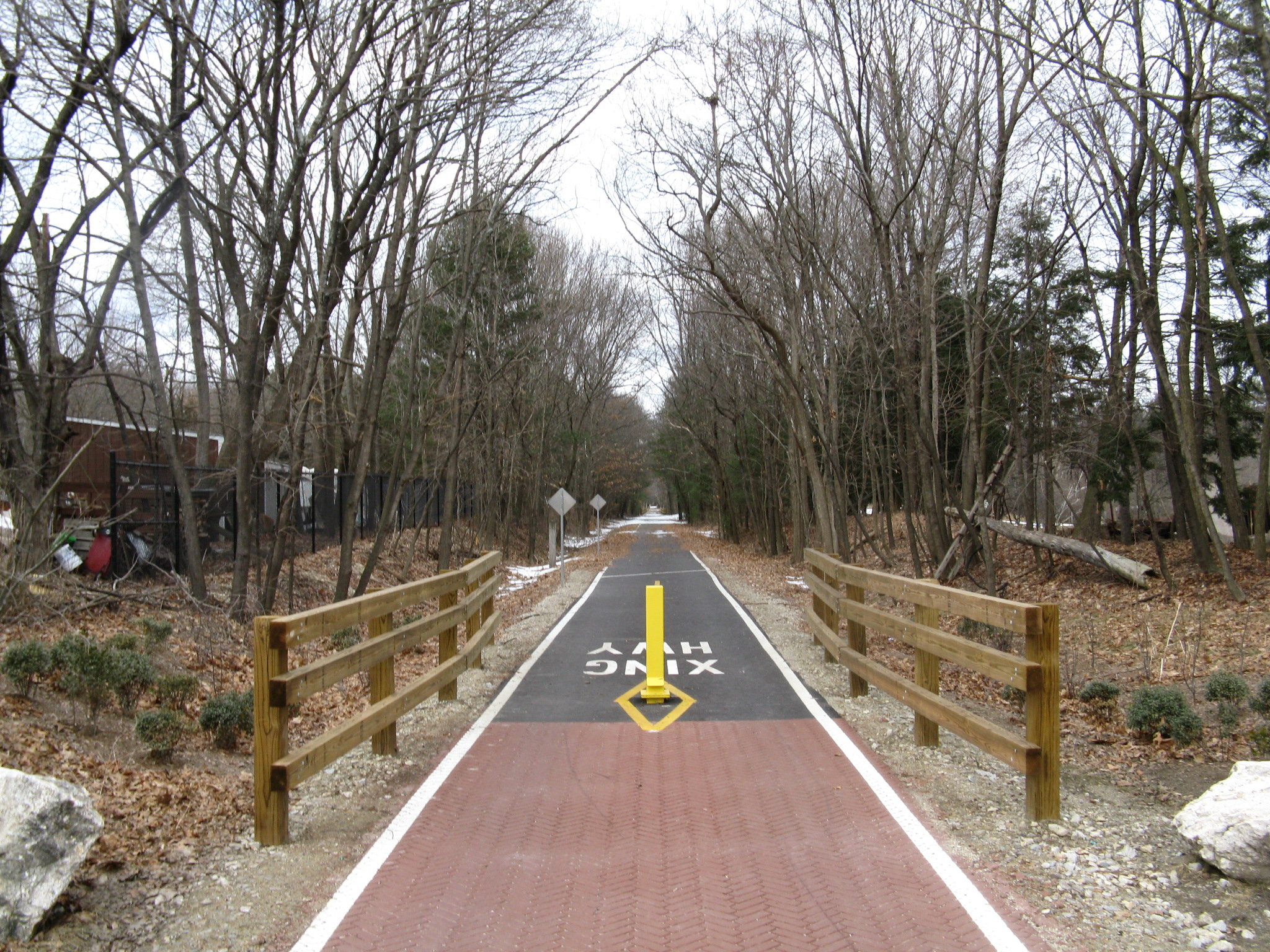
The Bruce Freeman Rail Trail in South Chelmsford, on the line once occupied by the Framingham and Lowell Railroad

Today, most of the network is still in use by CSX. The tracks of the former Boston, Clinton and Fitchburg Railroad between Sterling Junction and Pratts Junction were abandoned and converted into the Sterling Rail Trail. Additionally, the line no longer extends to Fitchburg, now ending in Leominster with the tracks between Leominster and Fitchburg also abandoned. The entirety of the former Framingham and Lowell Railroad line has also been abandoned, and is currently in various stages of being converted into Bruce Freeman Rail Trail. Some of the goods CSX hauls along the line include lumber, corn syrup, scrap metal, and plastic pellets.

== See also ==
- Fitchburg and Worcester Railroad
- Agricultural Branch Railroad
- Taunton Branch Railroad
- New Bedford and Taunton Railroad
- Middleborough and Taunton Railroad
- Mansfield and Framingham Railroad
- Fairhaven Branch Railroad
