= Ton =

Unit of mass or volume with different values

General information
- Unit system: British imperial; US customary; metric
- Unit of: Mass
- Definitions and equivalents
- ton, long ton; ton, short ton; tonne, metric ton: 2,240 lb; ~1,016.047 kg; 2,000 lb; ~907.185 kg; 1,000 kg; ~2,204.623 lb

A ton is any of several units of measure of mass, volume or force. It has a long history and has acquired several meanings and uses.

As a unit of mass, ton can mean:

- the long ton, which is 2,240 pounds (1,016.0 kilograms)
- the tonne, also called the metric ton, which is 1,000 kilograms (about 2,204.6 pounds) or 1 megagram.
- the short ton, which is 2,000 pounds (907.2 kilograms)

Its original use as a unit of volume has continued in the capacity of cargo ships and in units such as the freight ton and a number of other units, ranging from 35 to 100 cubic feet (0.99 to 2.83 m^{3}) in size.

Because the ton (of any system of measuring weight) is usually the heaviest unit named in colloquial speech, its name also has figurative uses, singular and plural, informally meaning a large amount or quantity, or to a great degree, as in "There's a ton of bees in this hive," "We have tons of homework," and "I love you a ton."

== History ==
The ton is derived from the tun, the term applied to a cask of the largest capacity. This could contain a volume between 175 and 213 imperial gallons (210 and 256 US gal; 800 and 970 L), which could weigh around 2,000 pounds (910 kg), and occupy some 60 cubic feet (1.7 m^{3}) of cargo space.

== Units of mass/weight ==
There are several similar units of mass or volume called the ton:

Full name(s)	Common name	Quantity (Note: Conversions are exact unless otherwise stated.)	Symbol	Notes
long ton	"ton" (United Kingdom)	2,240 lb (1,016.0469088 kg)	LT	Used in Ireland and Commonwealth countries that formerly used, or still use the Imperial system
short ton	"ton" (United States)	2,000 lb (907.18474 kg)	tn or st	Used in the United States and in some industries in Canada
tonne (equivalent to one megagram)	"tonne"; "metric ton"	1,000 kg (about 2,204.6226 lb)	t	Defined in the International System of Units. Used worldwide.
shortweight ton (Note: The longweight and shortweight tons were used as a means of making an allowance for wastage in an industrial process. The workman is provided with a longweight ton and is expected to return a shortweight ton of processed product. These measures were particularly used in the operation of hammering iron blooms into shape.)		2,240 lb		Used in the iron industry in the 17th and 18th centuries.
longweight ton		2,400 lb (Note: In other industries, a different longweight ton might be used. Coal miners delivered coal to the surface in longweight tons, but were paid only for a shortweight ton. This was supposedly to allow for "dirt" (non-coal rocks) in the output. Mine owners, however, were free to set the value of the longweight ton at a value of their own choosing, and in at least some cases, it was set to 25 cwt (2,800 lb) compared to the 20 cwt shortweight ton. This was a source of discontent amongst the miners who saw the practice as unfair in favour of the mine owners.)		Used in the iron industry in the 17th and 18th centuries.

The difference between the short ton and the other common forms ("long" and "metric") is about 10%, while the metric and long tons differ by less than 2%.

The metric tonne is usually distinguished by its spelling when written, but in the United States and United Kingdom, it is pronounced the same as ton, hence is often spoken as "metric ton" when it is necessary to make the distinction. In the United Kingdom the final "e" of "tonne" can also be pronounced (/ˈtʌni/). In Australia, it is pronounced /tɒn/.

In Ireland and most members of the Commonwealth of Nations, a ton is defined as 2,240 pounds (1,016.04691 kg). (Note: The "pound" used in this article is the avoirdupois pound. Its mass is defined as exactly 0.45359237 kg)

In the United States and Canada, a ton is defined as 2,000 pounds (907.18474 kg).

=== Other units of mass/weight ===
- Deadweight ton (abbreviation 'DWT' or 'dwt') is a measure of a ship's carrying capacity, including bunker oil, fresh water, ballast water, crew, and provisions. It is expressed in tonnes (1,000 kilograms (2,205 lb)) or long tons (2,240 pounds (1,016 kg)). This measurement is also used in the U.S. tonnage of naval ships.
- Increasingly, tonnes are being used rather than long tons in measuring the displacement of ships.
- Harbour ton, used in South Africa in the 20th century, was equivalent to (2,000 pounds (907 kg)) or 1 short ton.

Assay ton (abbreviation 'AT') is not a unit of measurement but a standard quantity used in assaying ores of precious metals. A short assay ton is approximately 29.17 g (1.029 oz) and a long assay ton is approximately 32.67 g (1.152 oz). These amounts bear the same ratio to a milligram as a short or long ton bears to a troy ounce. Therefore, the number of milligrams of a particular metal found in a sample weighing one assay ton gives the number of troy ounces of metal contained in a ton of ore.

In documents that predate 1960 the word ton is sometimes spelled tonne, but in more recent documents tonne refers exclusively to the metric ton.

In nuclear power plants tHM and MTHM mean tonnes of heavy metals, and MTU means tonnes of uranium. In the steel industry, the abbreviation THM means 'tons/tonnes hot metal', which refers to the amount of liquid iron or steel that is produced, particularly in the context of blast furnace production or specific consumption.

A dry ton or dry tonne has the same mass value, but the material (sludge, slurries, compost, and similar mixtures in which solid material is soaked with or suspended in water) has been dried to a relatively low, consistent moisture level (dry weight). If the material is in its natural, wet state, it is called a wet ton or wet tonne.

=== Subdivisions ===
Both the UK definition of long ton and US definition of short ton have similar underlying bases. Each is equivalent to 20 hundredweight; however, they are long 112 pounds (51 kg) and short 100 pounds (45 kg) hundredweight, respectively.

Before the 20th century there were several definitions. Prior to the 15th century in England, the ton was 20 hundredweight, each of 108 lb, giving a ton of 2,160 pounds (980 kg). In the 19th century in different parts of Britain, definitions of 2,240, or 2,352, or 2,400 lb were used, with 2,000 lb for explosives; the legal ton was usually 2,240 lb.

In the United Kingdom, Canada, Australia, and other areas that had used the imperial system, the tonne is the form of ton legal in trade.

== Units of volume ==
The displacement, essentially the weight, of a ship is traditionally expressed in long tons. To simplify measurement it is determined by measuring the volume, rather than weight, of water displaced, and calculating the weight from the volume and density. For practical purposes the displacement ton (DT) is a unit of volume, 35 cubic feet (0.9911 m^{3}), the approximate volume occupied by one ton of seawater (the actual volume varies with salinity and temperature). It is slightly less than the 224 imperial gallons (1.018 m^{3}) of the water ton (based on distilled water).

One measurement ton or freight ton is equal to 40 cubic feet (1.133 m^{3}), but historically it has had several different definitions. It is used to determine the amount of money to be charged in loading, unloading, or carrying different sorts of cargo. In general if a cargo is heavier than salt water, the actual weight is used. If it is lighter than salt water, e.g. feathers, freight is calculated in measurement tons of 40 cubic feet.

Gross tonnage and net tonnage are volumetric measures of the cargo-carrying capacity of a ship.

The Panama Canal/Universal Measurement System (PC/UMS) is based on net tonnage, modified for Panama Canal billing purposes. PC/UMS is based on a mathematical formula to calculate a vessel's total volume; a PC/UMS net ton is equivalent to 100 cubic feet of capacity.

The water ton is used chiefly in Great Britain, in statistics dealing with petroleum products, and is defined as 224 imperial gallons (35.96 cu ft; 1.018 m^{3}), the volume occupied by 1 long ton (2,240 lb; 1,016 kg) of water under the conditions that define the imperial gallon.

== Colloquial English ==
- Ton is also used informally, often as slang, to mean a large amount of something.
- In Britain, a ton is colloquially used to refer to 100 of a given unit. Ton can thus refer to a speed of 100 miles per hour (160 km/h), and is prefixed by an indefinite article, e.g. "Lee was doing a ton down the motorway"; to money e.g. "How much did you pay for that?" "A ton" (£100); to 100 points in a game e.g. "Eric just threw a ton in our darts game" (in some games, e.g. cricket, more commonly called a century); or to a hundred of any other countable figure.

== See also ==
- Conversion of units
- English units
- Gross ton mile
- Imperial units
- Systems of measurement
- TNT equivalent
- Ton of refrigeration
- truck classification
- unit of energy
- United States customary units
