= New Bedford Railroad =

American railroad

Map

The New Bedford Railroad was a railroad in Massachusetts. It was incorporated on July 1, 1873, as a merger between the New Bedford and Taunton Railroad, the Taunton Branch Railroad, and the Middleborough and Taunton Railroad. The main line ran from a junction with the Boston and Providence Railroad in Mansfield through the towns of Norton, Taunton, Berkley, Lakeville, and Freetown to the deep-water whaling port of New Bedford. The railroad also had several branches, including the former Middleborough and Taunton Railroad, which ran from Weir Village, Taunton into Middleborough through Raynham, and a shortcut to Providence via the Boston and Providence Railroad which ran from Taunton to Attleborough through Norton.

Less than a year after its formation, on February 2, 1874, the New Bedford Railroad entered into a fifty-year lease agreement with the Boston, Clinton and Fitchburg Railroad. Two months after the lease was signed, on April 8, 1874, the Legislature of Massachusetts authorized the sale of the former Middleborough and Taunton Railroad to the Old Colony Railroad, but the rest of the tracks remained in the system. On June 1, 1876, the New Bedford Railroad was consolidated with the Boston, Clinton and Fitchburg Railroad to form the Boston, Clinton, Fitchburg and New Bedford Railroad. In 1879, the Boston, Clinton, Fitchburg and New Bedford Railroad was leased for 99 years to the Old Colony Railroad, but still extended its own lease of the Framingham and Lowell Railroad to 98 years on October 1 of that same year. On September 10, 1881, the Framingham and Lowell Railroad was deeded on execution sale to the Boston, Clinton, Fitchburg, and New Bedford Railroad, forming the railroad's largest network with 126.2 miles of track system-wide.

On March 5, 1883, the Boston, Clinton, Fitchburg and New Bedford Railroad was outright consolidated into the Old Colony network. In 1893, the Old Colony Railroad was leased to the New York, New Haven and Hartford Railroad. By the 1960s, the New York, New Haven and Hartford Railroad, like many railroads, was struggling to stay solvent in the face of increased competition from alternate modes of transportation, and so in 1961 it petitioned to be included in the newly formed Penn Central Transportation Company. On December 31, 1968 all of its properties were purchased by Penn Central. Penn Central, however, soon went bankrupt, and on April 1, 1976 it was taken over by Conrail. On August 22, 1998, the Surface Transportation Board approved the buyout of Conrail by CSX and Norfolk Southern, with the former assuming control of the former New Bedford Railroad, including the former Middleborough and Taunton Railroad line that had been sold in 1874.

Today, the Massachusetts Coastal Railroad and CSX still runs trains over most of the former New Bedford Railroad system. The northernmost part of the line, between the junction with the former Boston and Providence Railroad in Mansfield and the Taunton city line, has been abandoned. Sections of this portion of the line have been converted to Old Colony Road, Fairfield Park, the Mansfield Municipal Airport, and the WWII Veterans Memorial Trail.

== See also ==
- Fall River Branch Railroad
- Fall River Railroad
- Mansfield and Framingham Railroad
- Fitchburg and Worcester Railroad
- Boston and Albany Railroad
- New York and New England Railroad
