= New Bedford and Taunton Railroad =

Railroad in Massachusetts

Map

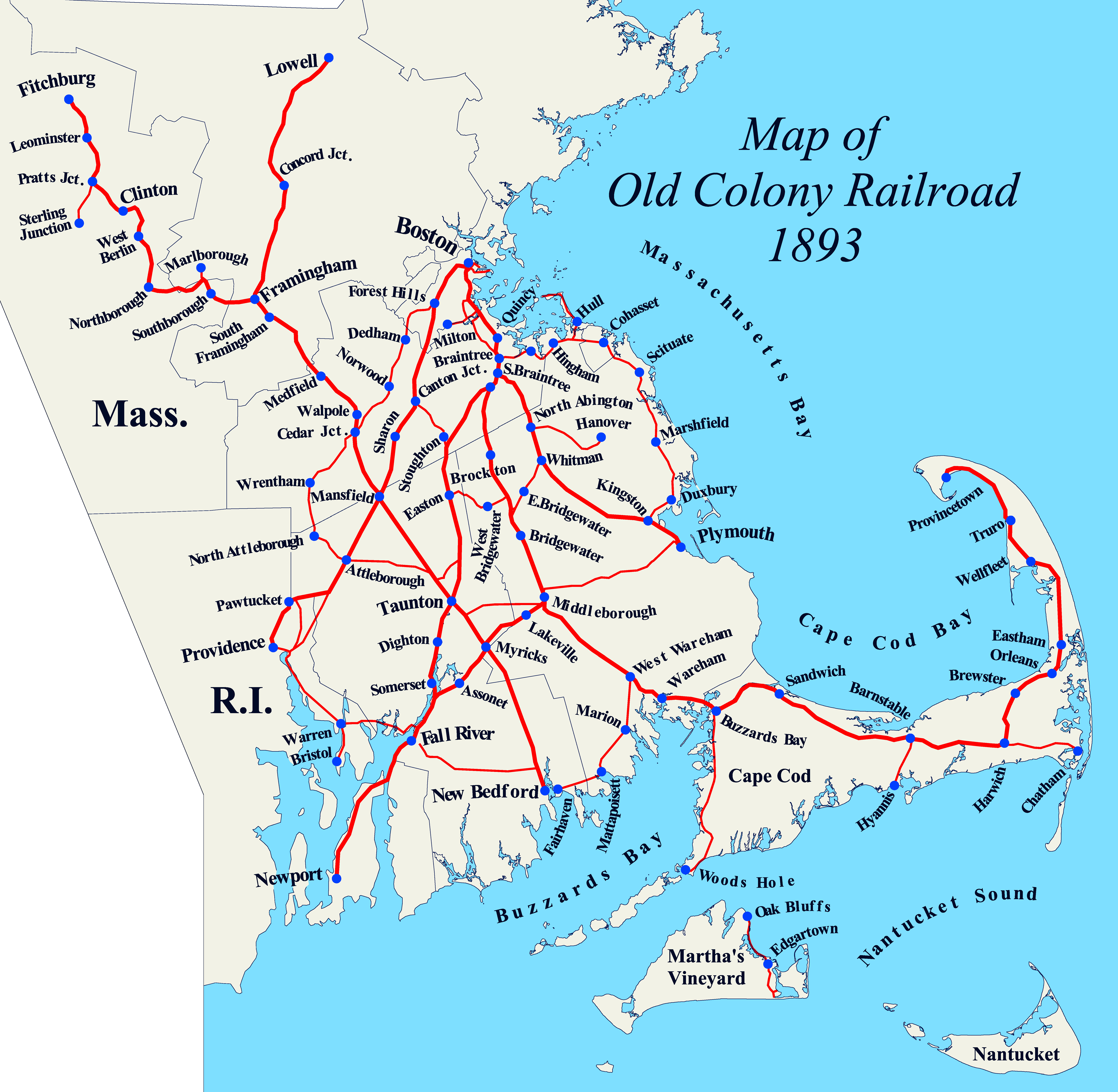
Map of the extent of the Old Colony Railroad network

The New Bedford and Taunton Railroad was originally incorporated at the Old Colony Railroad Corporation in 1836 as an extension of the Taunton Branch Railroad between Taunton and New Bedford, Massachusetts, United States. The name was changed to "New Bedford and Taunton Railroad" in 1839 before service began in 1840. The line ran 20 miles between Taunton and New Bedford.

In 1873, the New Bedford and Taunton Railroad merged with the Taunton Branch Railroad and the Middleborough and Taunton Railroad to become the New Bedford Railroad Company. In 1875, the Boston, Clinton and Fitchburg Railroad began leasing the New Bedford line. The two companies merged in 1876 to become the Boston, Clinton, Fitchburg and New Bedford Railroad.

In 1879, the Boston, Clinton, Fitchburg and New Bedford Railroad was leased by the Old Colony Railroad for 999 years before being consolidated into the Old Colony Railroad system in 1883.

The original 1840 alignment of the New Bedford and Taunton Railroad is currently part of the South Coast Rail project from New Bedford to Boston.

== See also ==
- New Bedford Subdivision
- Fairhaven Branch Railroad
