= Agricultural Branch Railroad =

Railroad in Massachusetts, United States

Map of the Boston, Clinton and Fitchburg Railroad

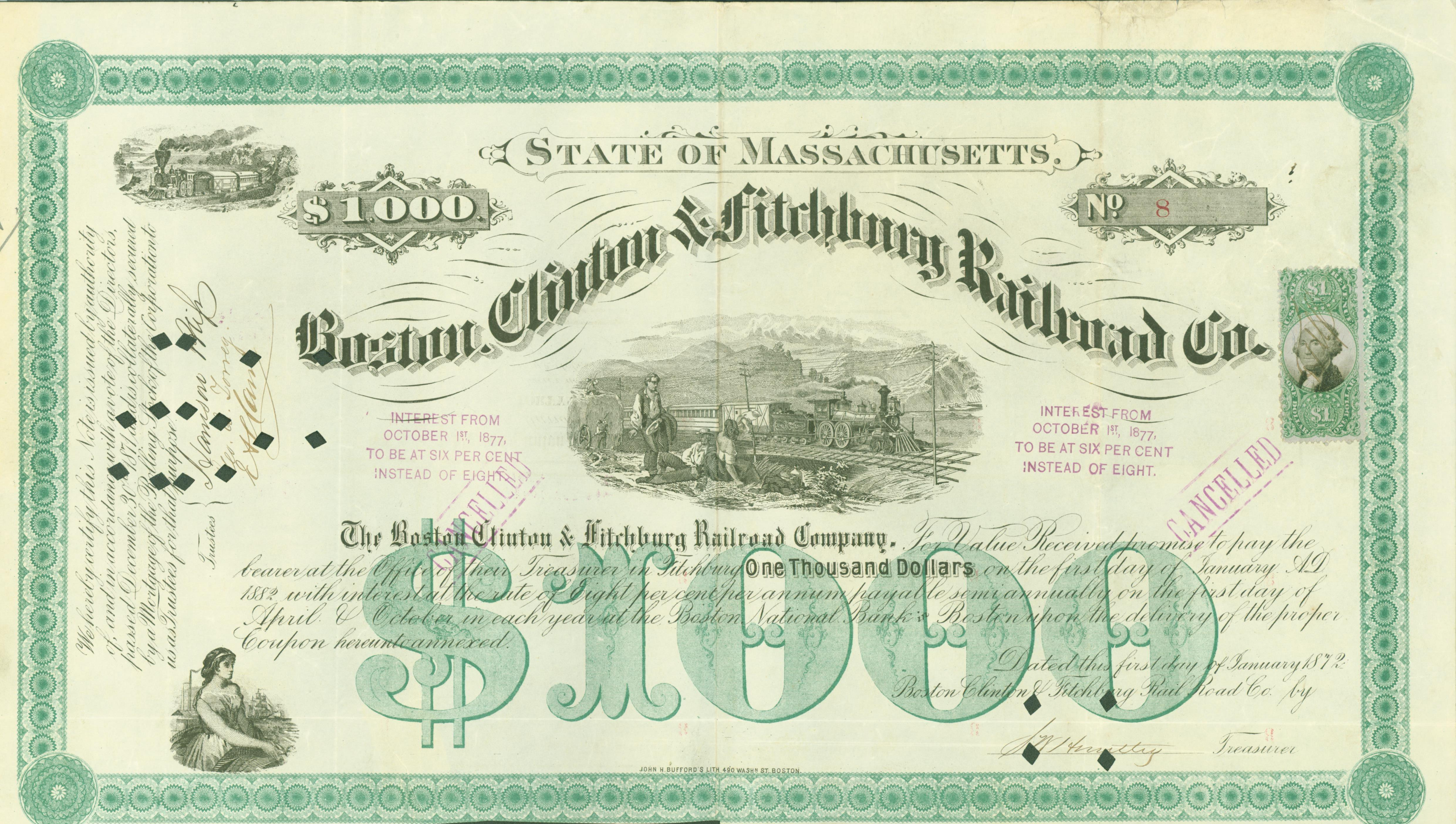
Bond of the Boston, Clinton & Fitchburg Railroad Company, issued 1. January 1872

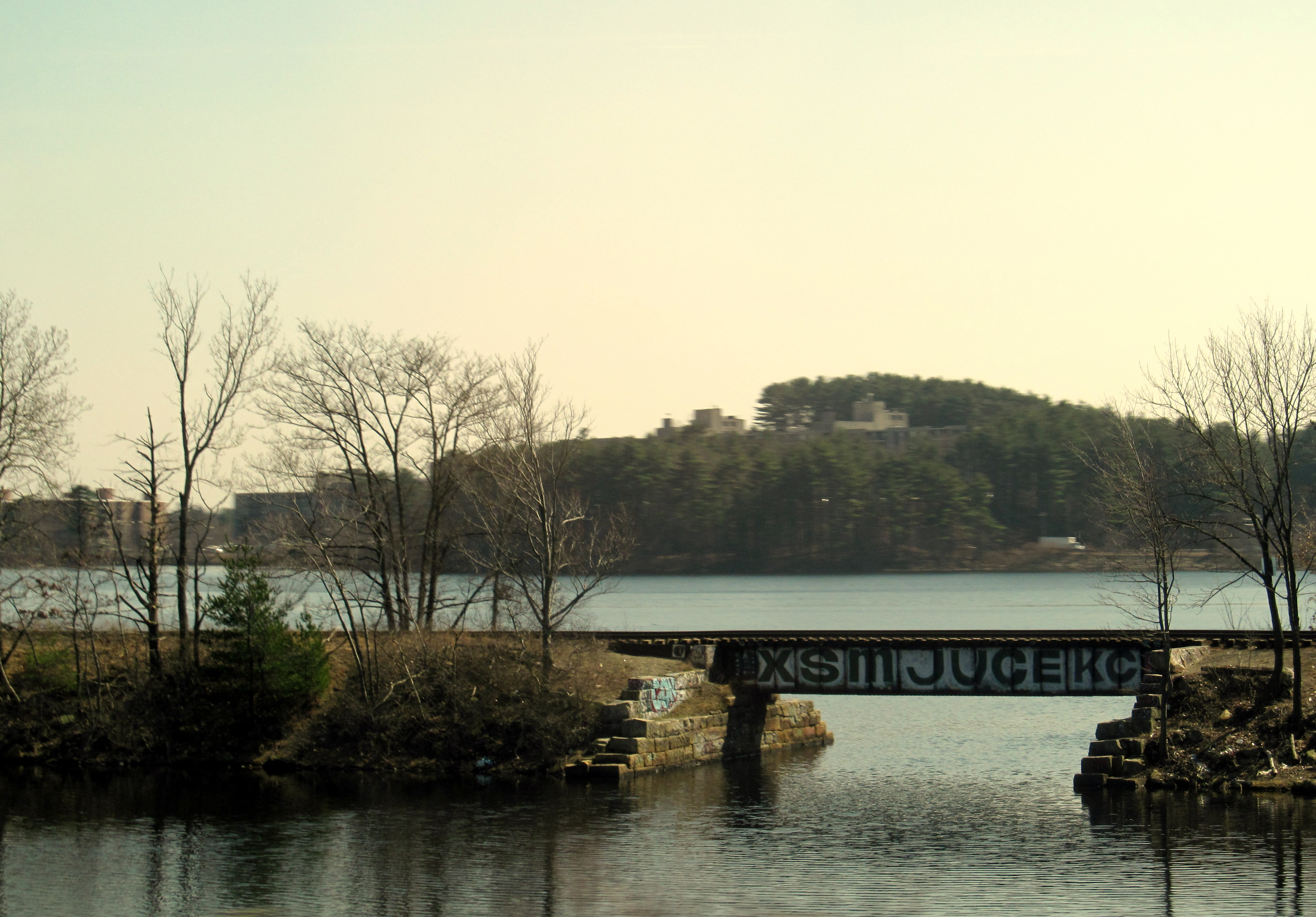
Bridge carrying the Agricultural Branch over Foss Reservoir in Framingham

The Agricultural Branch Railroad was a railroad in Massachusetts. It was incorporated by the Legislature of Massachusetts on April 26, 1847, to provide a rail connection between Framingham and Northborough through the town of Southborough and a small portion of the city of Marlborough. Service began on December 1, 1855.

A 1.5-mile branch off the 13.2-mile main line from Marlborough Junction into Marlborough was added in June 1855. In July 1866, the railroad opened a 14-mile extension from Northborough to the Fitchburg and Worcester Railroad at Pratts Junction in Sterling via the towns of Berlin, Boylston, Lancaster, and Clinton, bringing the entire line up to 28.7 miles of track and establishing connections to Fitchburg and the growing railroad hub of Worcester. On May 20, 1867, the name of the railroad was changed to the Boston, Clinton and Fitchburg Railroad, and in 1869, it merged with the Fitchburg and Worcester Railroad.

On April 1, 1872, the Boston, Clinton, and Fitchburg Railroad signed a twenty-year lease of the nearby Framingham and Lowell Railroad, which connected with the Boston, Clinton, and Fitchburg Railroad in Framingham and provided a connection to the major mill city of Lowell.

On January 1, 1873, the Boston, Clinton, and Fitchburg Railroad signed a fifty-year lease of the Mansfield and Framingham Railroad, providing a connection to the Boston and Providence Railroad and the Taunton Branch Railroad in Mansfield. On July 1, 1873, the Taunton Branch Railroad merged with the New Bedford and Taunton Railroad and the Middleborough and Taunton Railroad to form the New Bedford Railroad. Less than a year later, on February 2, 1874, the Boston, Clinton, and Fitchburg Railroad entered into a fifty-year lease agreement with the New Bedford Railroad, which provided access to the deep water whaling port at New Bedford. On June 1, 1875, the Boston, Clinton, and Fitchburg Railroad consolidated with the Mansfield and Framingham Railroad, and exactly one year later, on June 1, 1876, the Boston, Clinton, and Fitchburg Railroad merged with the New Bedford Railroad to form the Boston, Clinton, Fitchburg and New Bedford Railroad. In 1879, the Boston, Clinton, Fitchburg and New Bedford Railroad was leased to the Old Colony Railroad for 999 years, but on October 1 of that same year nonetheless extended its lease of the Framingham and Lowell Railroad to 998 years. On September 10, 1881, the Framingham and Lowell Railroad was deeded on execution sale to the Boston, Clinton, Fitchburg, and New Bedford Railroad, forming the railroad's largest network with 126.2 miles of track system-wide.

On March 5, 1883, the Boston, Clinton, Fitchburg and New Bedford Railroad was outright consolidated into the Old Colony network. In 1893, the Old Colony Railroad was leased to the New York, New Haven and Hartford Railroad (NYNH&H). The NYNH&H discontinued passenger service into Marlborough in 1937 and abandoned the spur altogether in 1966. By the 1960s, the NYNH&H, like many railroads, was struggling to stay solvent in the face of increased competition from alternate modes of transportation, and so in 1961 it petitioned to be included in the newly formed Penn Central Transportation Company. On December 31, 1968, all of its properties were purchased by Penn Central. Penn Central, however, soon went bankrupt, and on April 1, 1976, it was taken over by Conrail. On August 22, 1998, the Surface Transportation Board approved the buyout of Conrail by CSX and Norfolk Southern, with the former assuming control of the former Agricultural Branch Railroad line.

== The line today ==
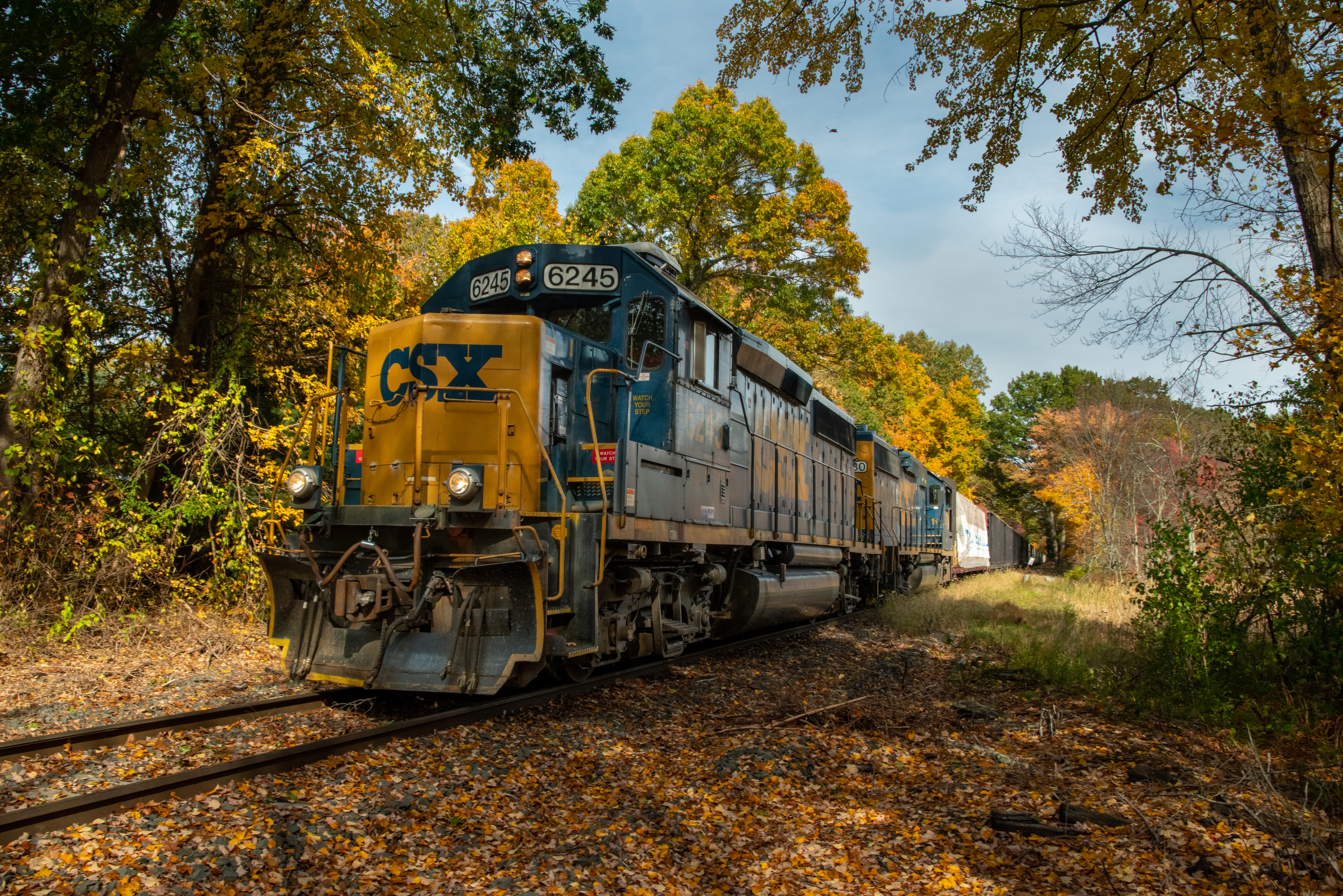
A CSX train on the Fitchburg Secondary in Southborough

Today, the line is still in use by CSX, though portions have been abandoned. Starting in 1898, the tracks of the former Fitchburg and Worcester Railroad between Pratt's Junction and Sterling Junction primarily served a cider mill in the center of Sterling; however, trains only accessed the mill from Pratt's Junction and thus the tracks from Sterling Center to Sterling Junction were torn up. Today, this section of track bed forms a portion of the Central Mass Rail Trail despite not being a part of the former Central Massachusetts Railroad, which composes much of the rest of this rail trail network. The tracks from Sterling Center to Pratt's Junction remained in use until the cider mill ceased operation in the late 1970s, at which point they too were torn up and the tracks between Pratt's Junction and Fitchburg essentially became another extension of the former Agricultural Branch Railroad line. Other abandoned sections include the track from Leominster through Fitchburg and the branch from Marlborough Junction into Marlborough. Currently, the line is primarily used to haul lumber, corn syrup, scrap metal, and plastic pellets. Approximately 105 million gross ton-miles were moved over the branch between Framingham and Leominster in 2019.

== See also ==
- Worcester and Nashua Railroad
- Boston and Albany Railroad
