= Taunton Branch Railroad =

Railway line

Map

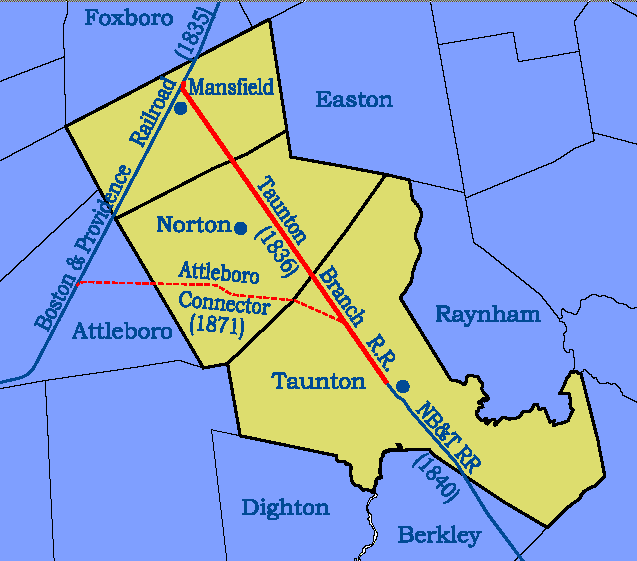
Map of Taunton Branch Railroad

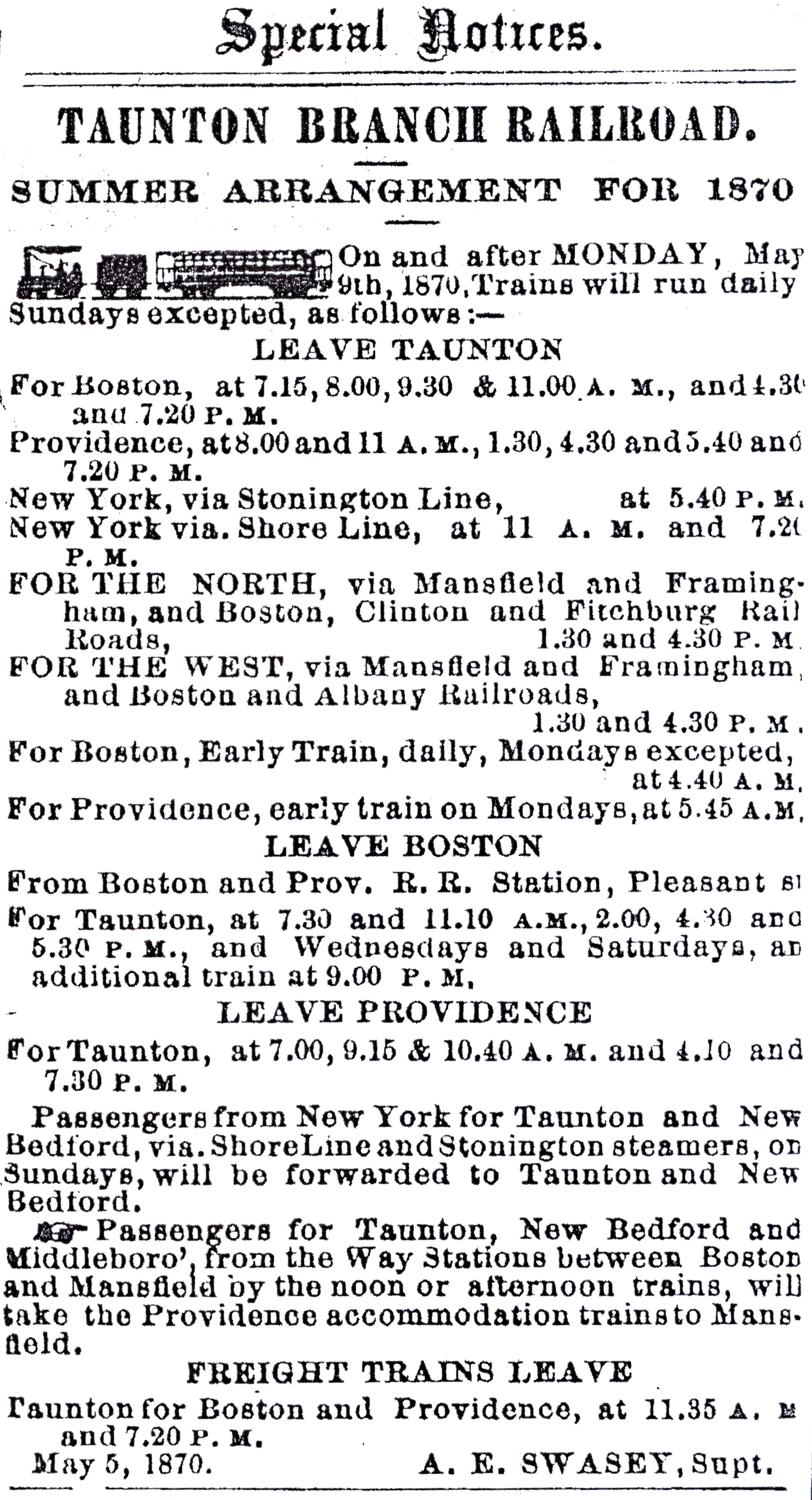
1870 schedule

The Taunton Branch Railroad was one of the earliest railroads to be established in Massachusetts, United States. It was chartered by the state in 1835 as a branch of the Boston and Providence Railroad (which opened in 1835) running between Mansfield and Taunton, Massachusetts. The railroad provided a rapid overland connection between the seat of Bristol County and Boston and Providence.

== Origins ==
The Taunton Branch Railroad opened for business in 1836. The overall length of the railroad was about 11.5 miles. Thomas B. Wales served as the company's first president.

In 1840 the Taunton Branch Railroad was extended to New Bedford, Massachusetts by the New Bedford and Taunton Railroad, providing Taunton with a direct link to the whaling port city.

The railroad opened up new markets for Taunton's notable ironmaking industry, and would lead to the rapid development of new businesses in the coming decades.

In 1845 another branch, known as the Fall River Branch Railroad, was built between Myricks and the emerging textile town of Fall River. However, in 1846, Fall River trains bypassed Taunton and the Boston & Providence main line with the opening of their own connection, renamed the Fall River Railroad through Middleborough and Bridgewater to the Old Colony Railroad at South Braintree.

== Expansion ==
In 1856, the Middleboro and Taunton Railroad was opened between Weir Village and the Cape Cod Railroad at Middleborough.

In 1870, an extension of the original Taunton Branch Railroad was opened between Mansfield and Framingham, Massachusetts, known as the Mansfield and Framingham Railroad, and leased by the adjoining Boston, Clinton and Fitchburg Railroad (BC&F).

In 1871, the Taunton Railroad built a new connection to Attleboro, providing a shortcut to Providence.

On February 2, 1874, the Taunton Branch Railroad was merged into the New Bedford Railroad. The following year, the BC&F began leasing the New Beford's line. The two companies merged in 1876 to become the Boston, Clinton, Fitchburg and New Bedford Railroad.

In 1879 the Old Colony Railroad leased the combined company, merging it into itself in 1883.

== Today ==
The southern portion of the original Taunton Branch Railroad northeast of downtown Taunton is part of the CSX Transportation freight network, along with the original extensions to New Bedford and Fall River. The CSX lines connect to an extension with Attleboro that was built in 1871 as a shortcut between Taunton and Providence, Rhode Island.

Much of the original northern portion of the Taunton Branch Railroad has been abandoned, with the northernmost section between Mansfield Center and the Mansfield Municipal Airport having been converted to a bike path. In 2019 the state awarded $265,000 for construction of an extension of the trail.

== See also ==
- Taunton Locomotive Manufacturing Company
- New York, New Haven and Hartford Railroad
