= Shipping ton =

A shipping ton, freight ton, measurement ton or ocean ton is a measure of volume used for shipments of freight in large vehicles, trains or ships. In the USA, it is equivalent to 40 cubic feet (1.1 m^{3}) while in the UK it is 42 cubic feet (1.2 m^{3}). It should not be confused with other types of ton which also measure volume. For example, the register ton, which is used to measure the capacity of ships, is 100 cubic feet (2.8 m^{3}).

== See also ==
- Twenty-foot equivalent unit
