= Old Colony Railroad =

Former railroad system in Massachusetts and Rhode Island

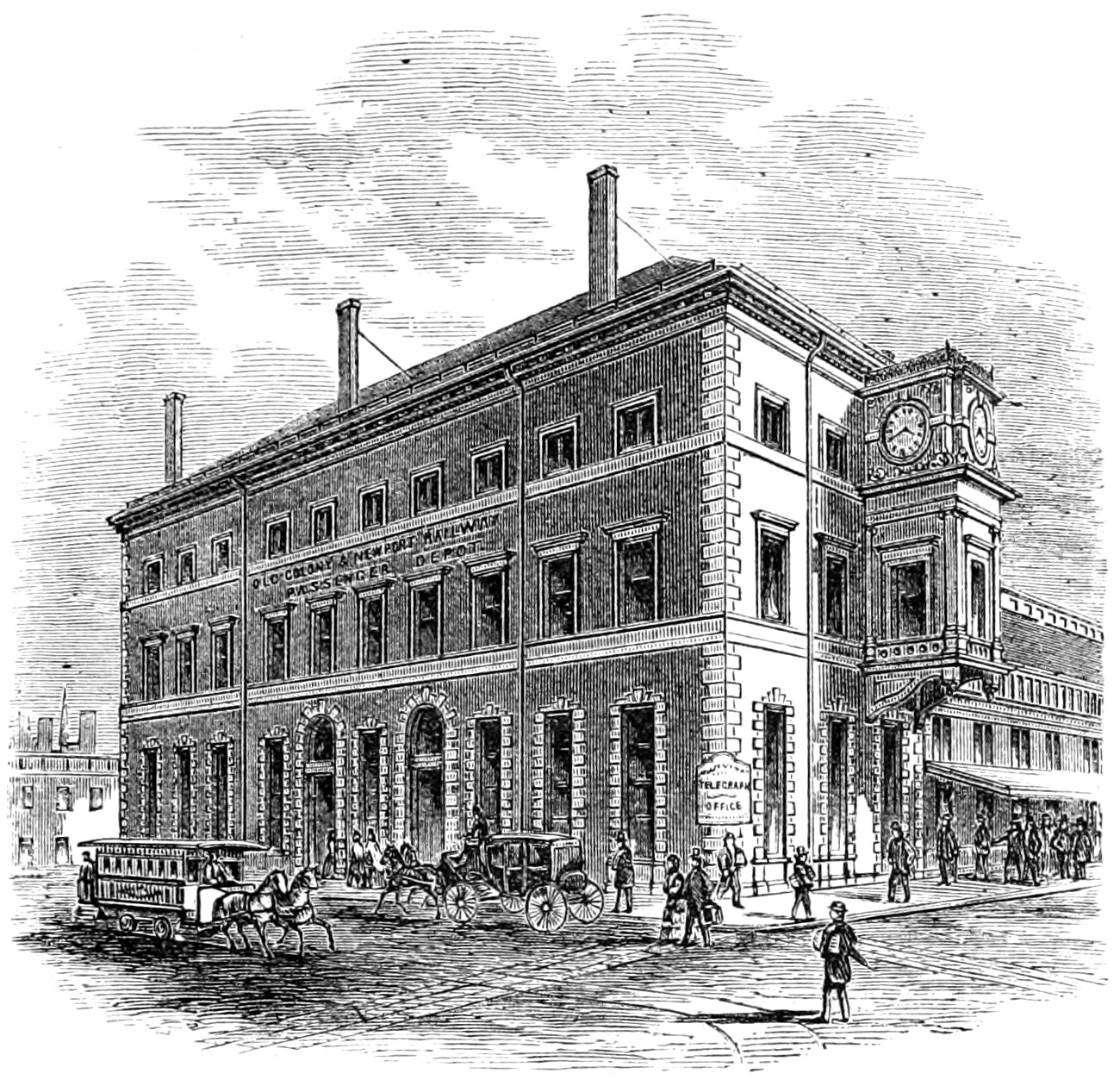
- The Old Colony Railroad's terminal in Boston

Overview
- Headquarters: Boston, Massachusetts
- Locale: Boston, Massachusetts; Providence, Rhode Island
- Dates of operation: 1845–1893
- Successor: New York, New Haven and Hartford Railroad

Technical
- Track gauge: 4 ft 8 1/2 in (1,435 mm) standard gauge
- Length: 617 mi (993 km) (1893)

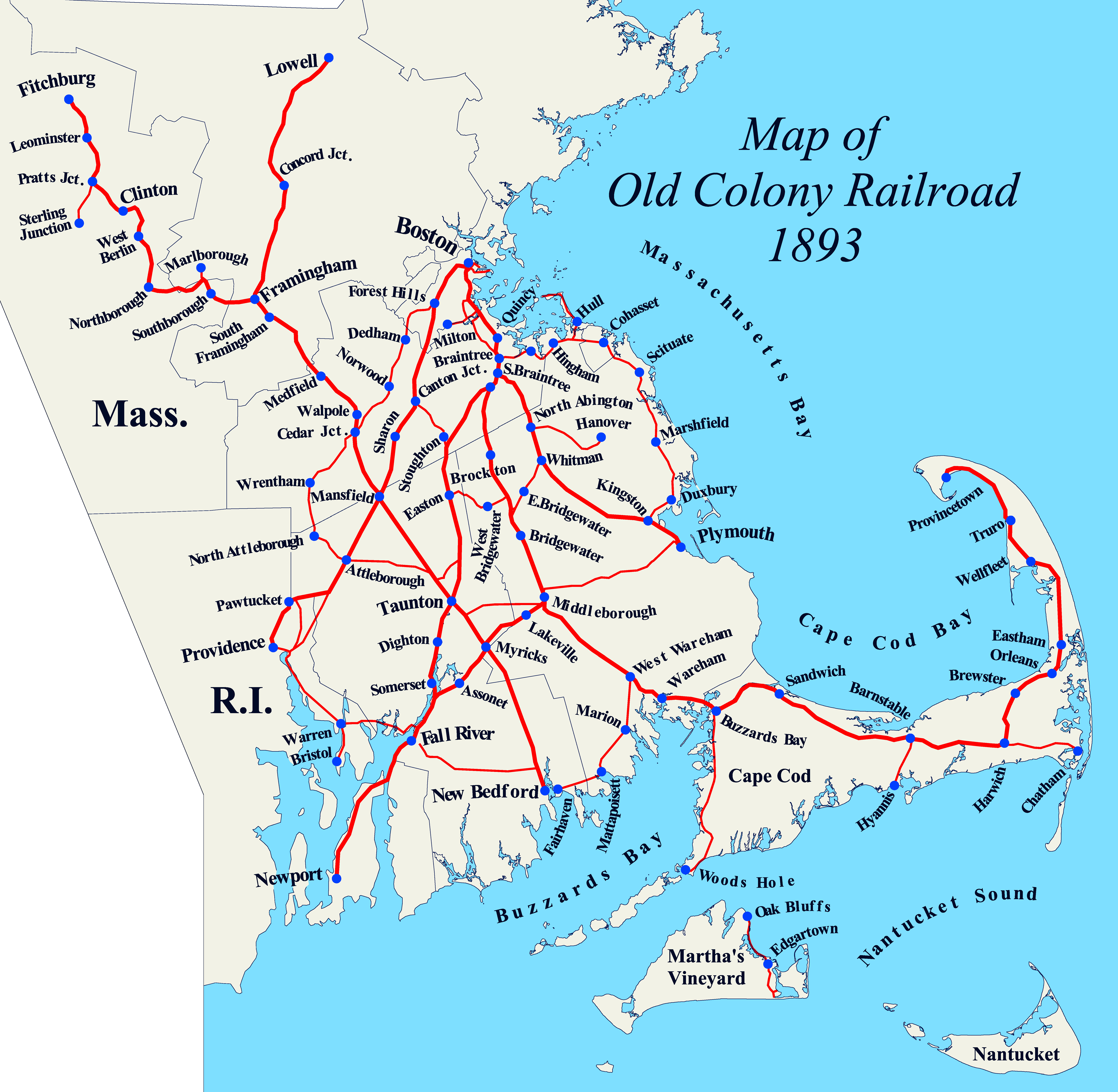
Map of Old Colony Railroad network, about 1893

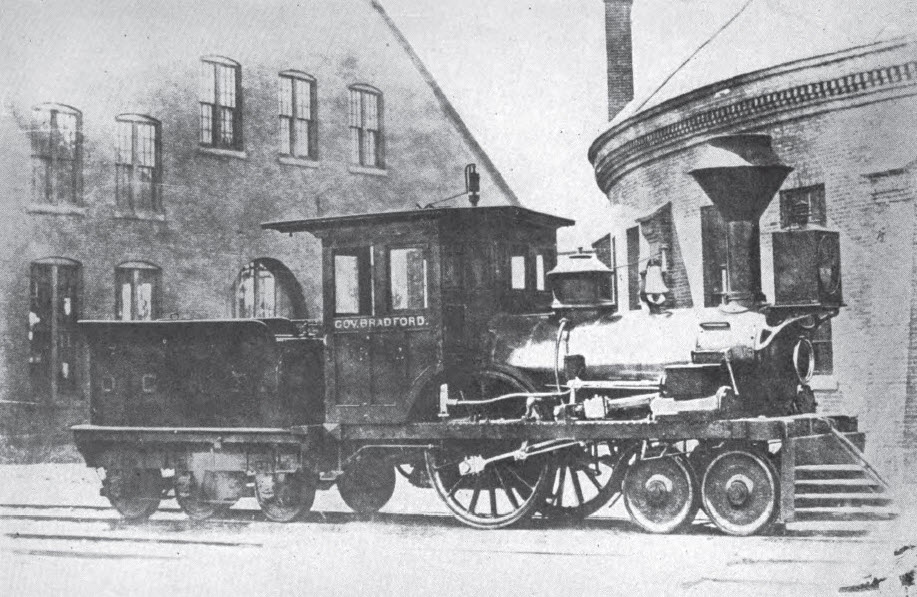
The Governor Bradford, an early OC locomotive built in 1845 by Hinkley & Drury

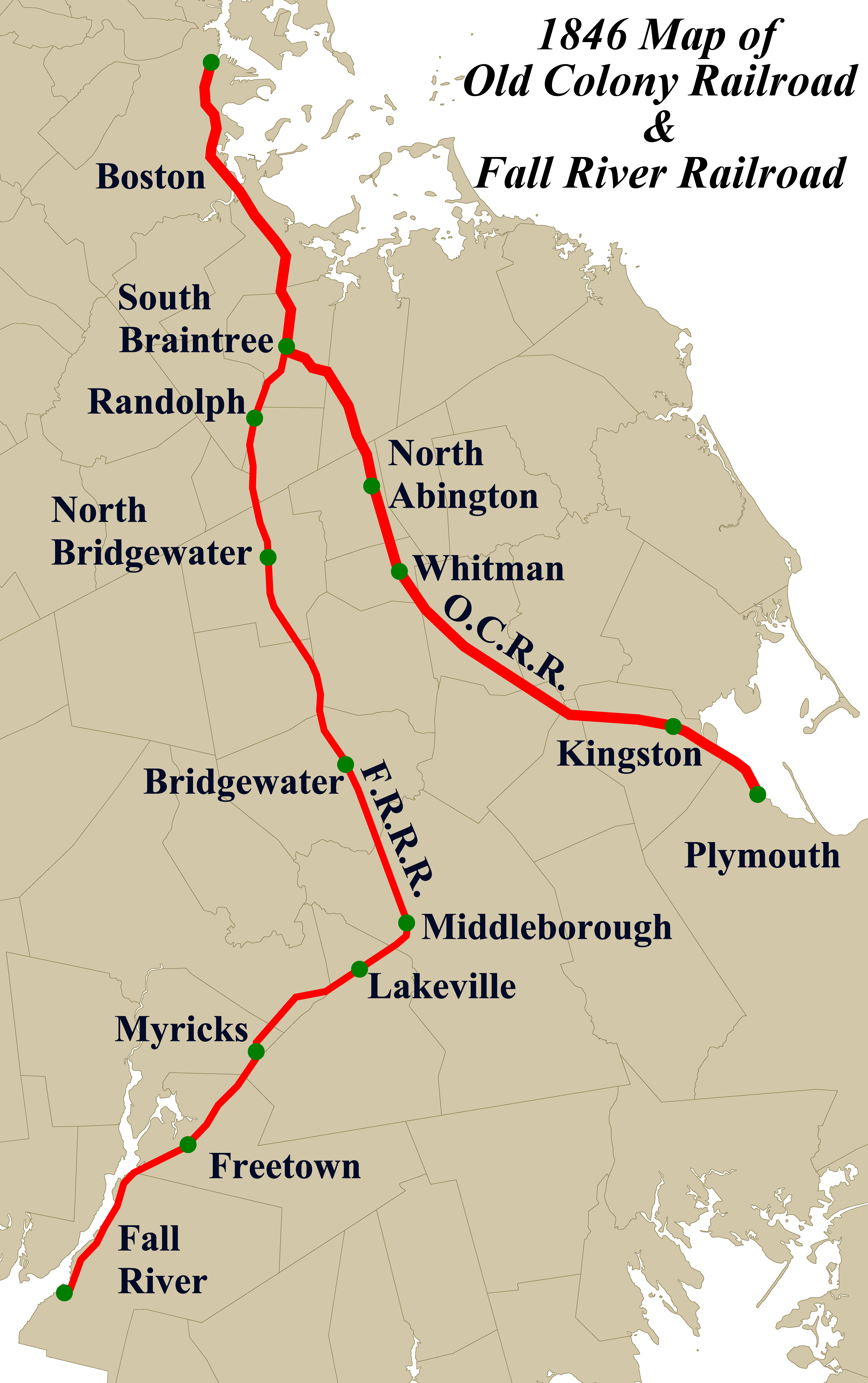
Map of Old Colony and Fall River lines, 1846

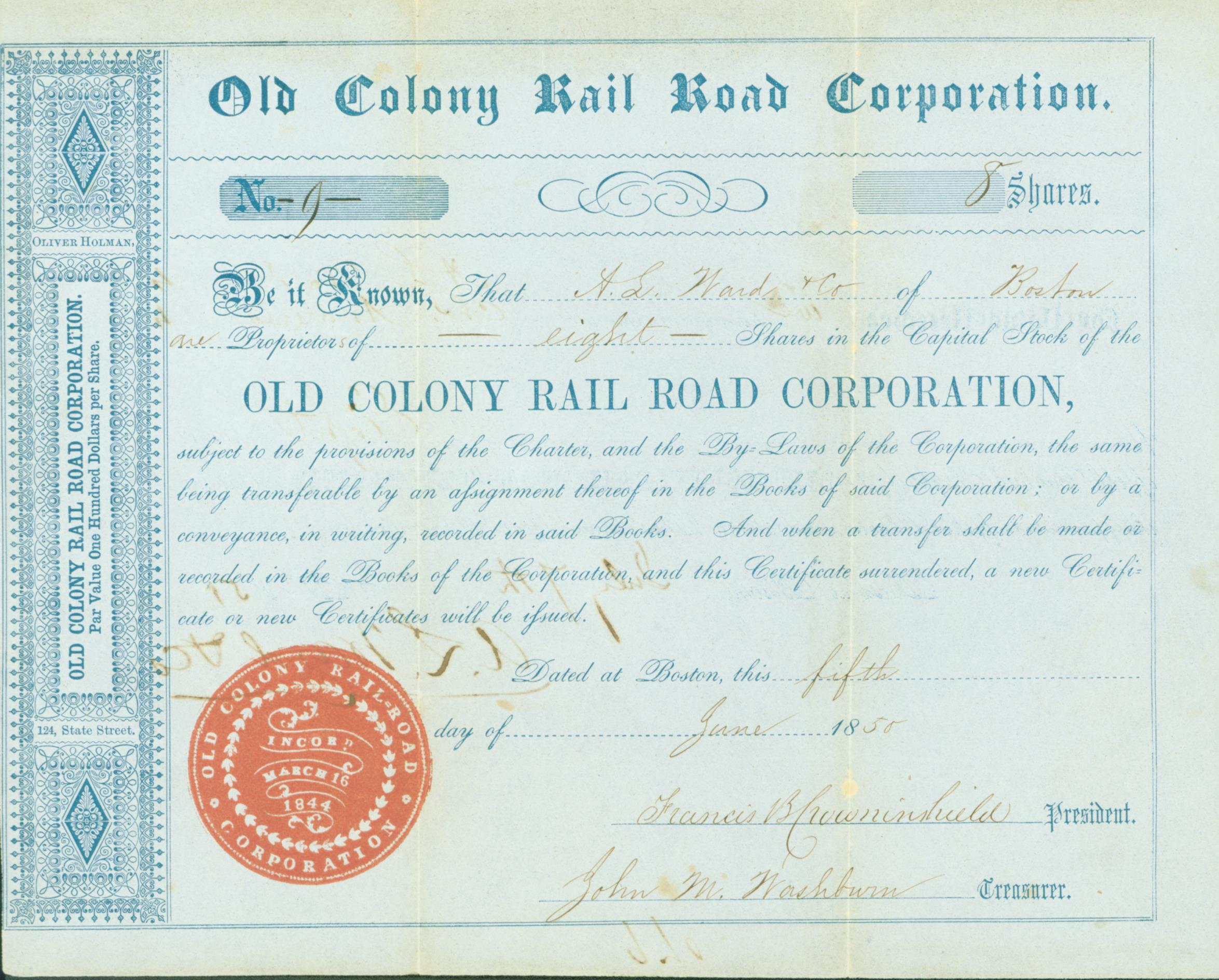
Share of the Old Colony Rail Road Corporation, issued June 15, 1850

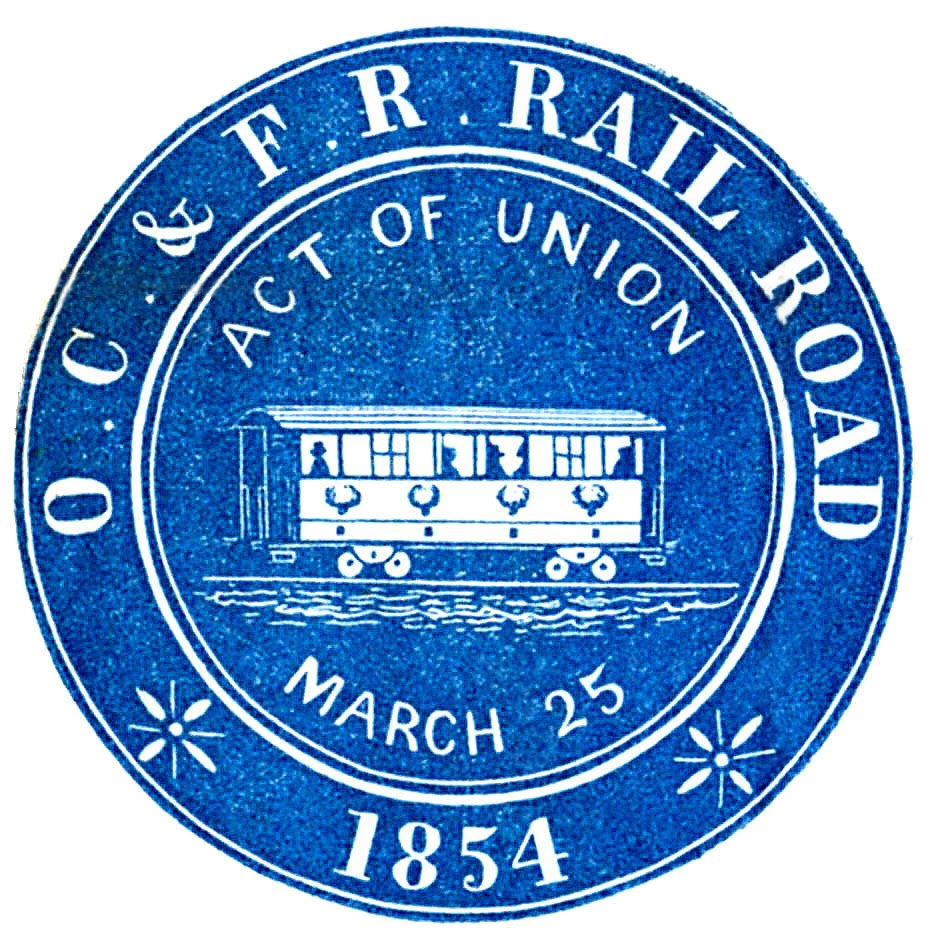
Old Colony & Fall River Rail Road seal from 1854 stock certificate

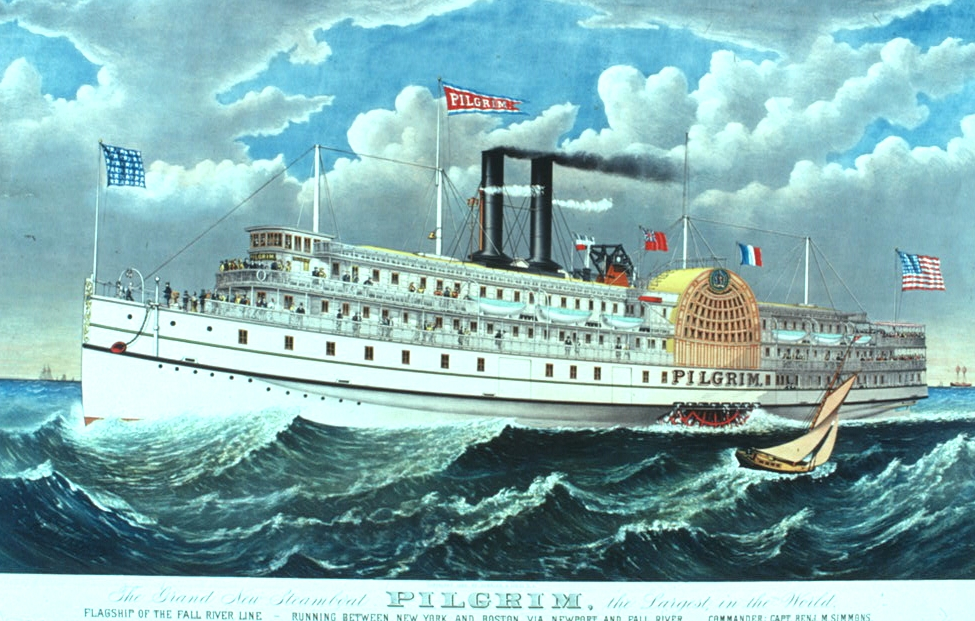
The Pilgrim, of the Fall River Line, operated by the Old Colony Railroad Company

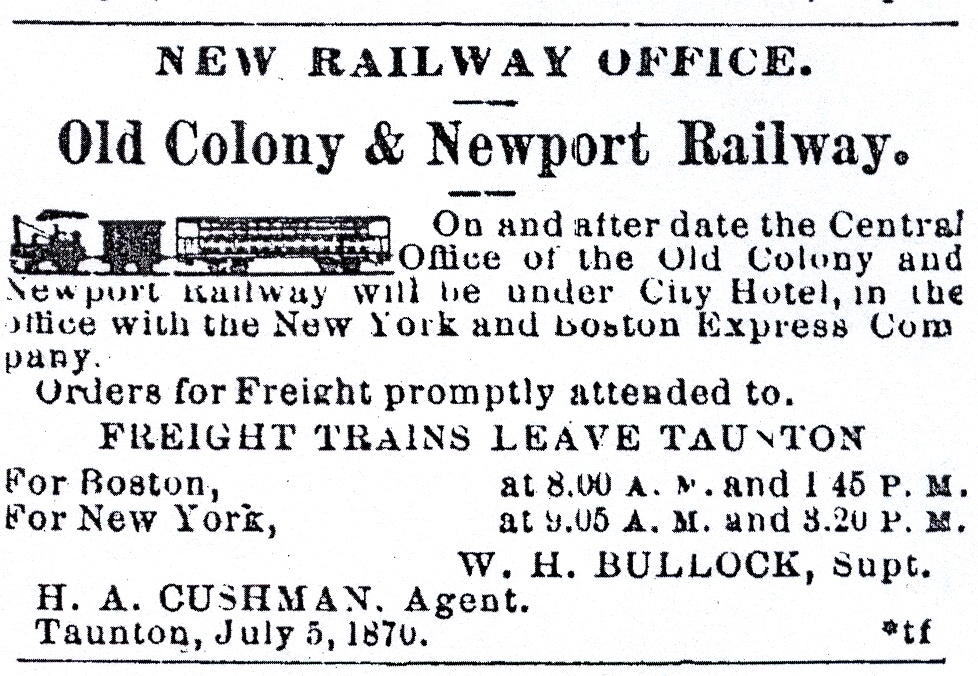
1870 Notice for Old Colony & Newport Railway

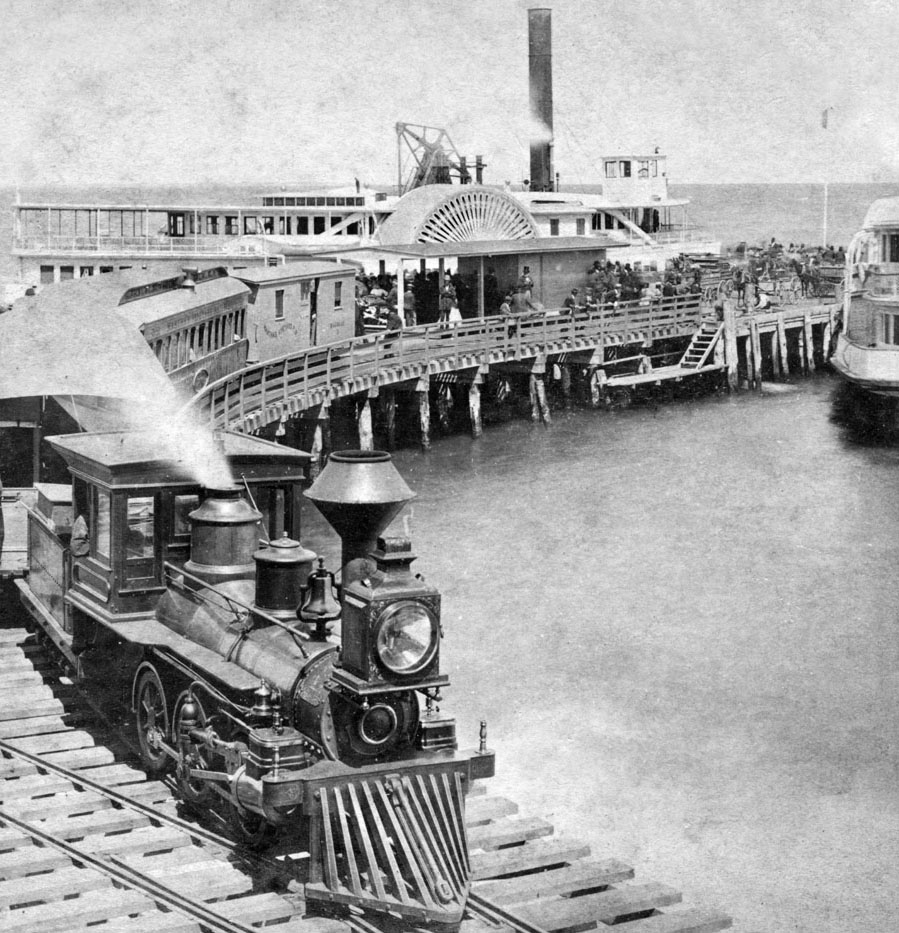
Martha's Vineyard Railroad

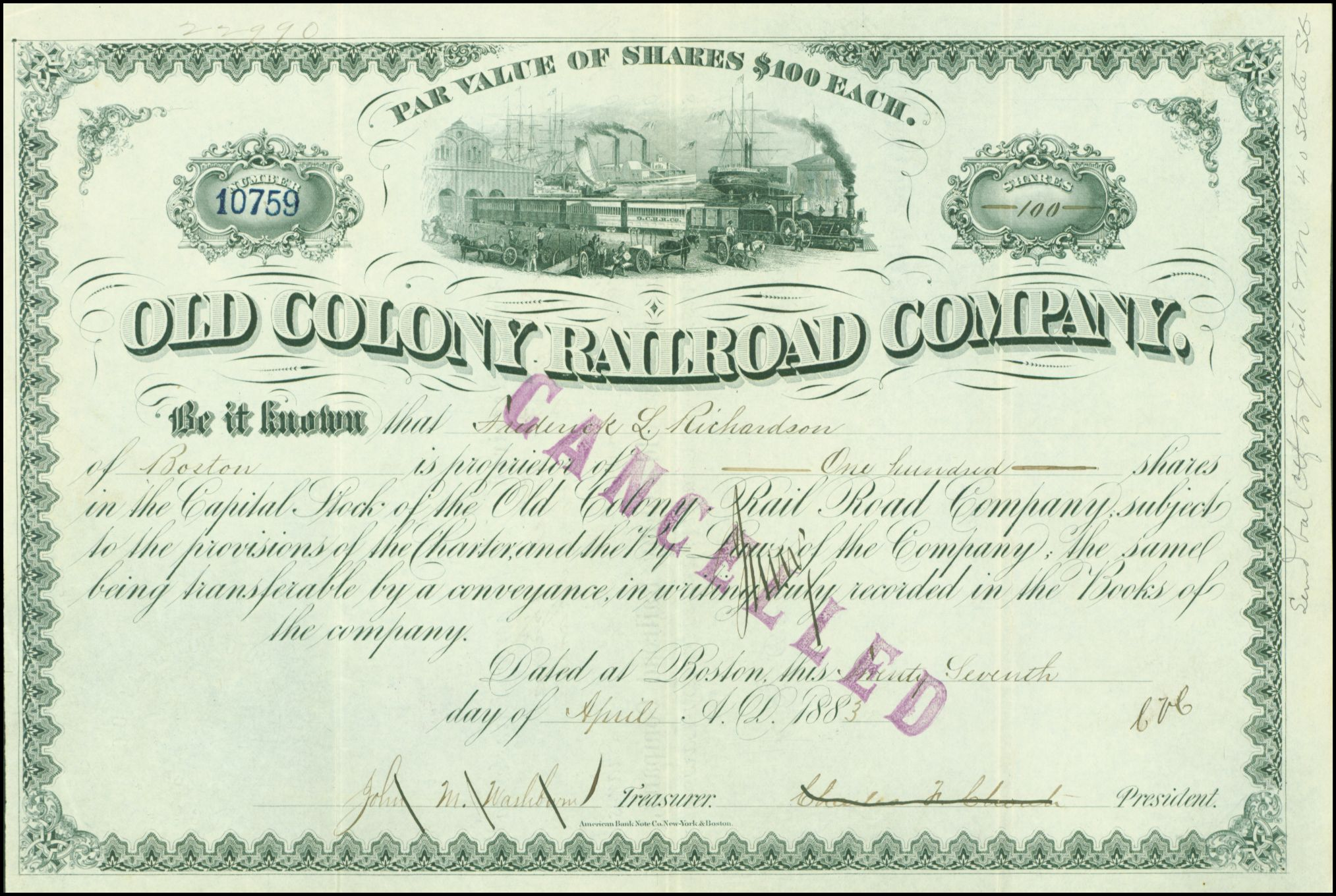
Share of the Old Colony Railroad Company, issued April 27, 1883

The Old Colony Railroad (OC) was a major railroad system, mainly covering southeastern Massachusetts and parts of Rhode Island, which operated from 1845 to 1893. Old Colony trains ran from Boston to points such as Plymouth, Fall River, New Bedford, Newport, Providence, Fitchburg, Lowell and Cape Cod. For many years the Old Colony Railroad Company also operated steamboat and ferry lines, including those of the Fall River Line with express train service from Boston to its wharf in Fall River where passengers boarded luxury liners to New York City. The company also briefly operated a railroad line on Martha's Vineyard, as well as the freight-only Union Freight Railroad in Boston. The OC was named after the "Old Colony", the nickname for the Plymouth Colony.

From 1845 to 1893, the OC network grew extensively largely through a series of mergers and acquisitions with other established railroads, until it was itself acquired by the New York, New Haven and Hartford Railroad under a lease agreement on March 1, 1893, for its entire 617-mile (993 km) network. After this date, all trains, lines, and stations became known as the "Old Colony Division" of the huge "New Haven" system. During this period, the New York, New Haven and Hartford Railroad enjoyed a virtual monopoly on all passenger and freight rail service in southern New England.

Passenger service on the New Haven's Old Colony Division ended in 1959, except for the main line between Boston and Providence and other ex-Boston and Providence Railroad lines. Several lines have been restored to passenger service: the Plymouth/Kingston Line and Middleborough/Lakeville Line in 1997, and the Greenbush Line in 2007. The South Coast Rail project extended the Middleborough/Lakeville line in 2025 as the Fall River/New Bedford Line.

Other parts of the former OC system continue to be used for freight service by CSX Transportation and other short line railroads, including the Massachusetts Coastal Railroad which operates on Cape Cod and in southeastern Massachusetts. Parts of the former OC on Cape Cod are also still used to operate the Cape Cod Central Railroad tourist train from Hyannis to Buzzards Bay during the summer and fall months. Another tourist railroad, the Old Colony and Newport Scenic Railway operates on part of the former OC from Newport on Aquidneck Island.

Several abandoned portions of the OC have been converted into multi-use rail trails. These include the East Bay Bike Path in Rhode Island, as well as others in Lowell, Mansfield, Fairhaven, and the Cape Cod Rail Trail on Cape Cod.

== History ==
=== Old Colony Railroad (1844–1854) ===
By the early 1840s, the city of Boston had six major rail lines connecting it with other places including Lowell, Maine, Fitchburg, and Salem to the north, Worcester to the west and Providence, Rhode Island to the southwest. The southeastern part of Massachusetts had yet to be served by a rail link to Boston.

On March 16, 1844, the Old Colony Railroad Corporation was formed to provide a rail connection between Boston and Plymouth. Construction of the line began in South Boston in June 1844 and the 36.8-mile (59.2 km) line opened to Plymouth on November 10, 1845. The extension from South Boston to the newly completed Kneeland Street Station in Boston opened on June 19, 1847. Kneeland Street also served as the headquarters for the OC until the 1893 consolidation.

There had previously been an Old Colony Railroad formed in 1838 for a line between Taunton and New Bedford, but the name was changed to the New Bedford and Taunton Railroad in 1839 before service began in 1840. This line would later become part of OC in 1879.

John Sever of Kingston, Massachusetts, served as the first president of the Old Colony Railroad Corporation from 1844-1845. Nathan Carruth served as the second president of the corporation from 1845 to 1848. Carruth was a successful businessman and enthusiastic supporter of the expansion of railroads in Massachusetts and elsewhere in New England. With the opening of the Old Colony line through Dorchester in 1845, Carruth became actively involved in the development of the area. He built an estate on the east side of Dorchester Avenue called Beechmont/Beaumont which would become one of the first railroad suburbs in America.

All OC locomotives were named until 1884, after which they were simply numbered. Among the early engines were the Mayflower, Governor Carver, Governor Bradford, and Miles Standish. The new railroad company also built the Samoset Hotel near the end of its line in Plymouth. In 1847, the OC completed a short 6.2-mile (10.0 km) connector line from its main line at Whitman to the Fall River Railroad line at Bridgewater Junction. On April 1, 1849, OC signed a lease of the South Shore Railroad for a period of five years. By 1851, traffic on the line had increased enough to warrant the opening of a second track running between Boston and South Braintree.

=== Old Colony and Fall River Railroad (1854–1863) ===
The OC and Fall River Railroad merged with a joint stock vote on June 20, 1854, forming the Old Colony and Fall River Railroad Company, which provided a two-pronged line from Boston to Plymouth and Boston to Fall River, splitting at South Braintree. Alexander Holmes from Kingston served as company president during this period, from 1854 to 1866.

The Fall River Railroad had been formed on August 8, 1845, with the consolidation of three companies; the Fall River Branch Railroad, the Randolph and Bridgewater Railroad and the Middleborough Railroad. The Fall River Railroad was led by Richard Borden, a prominent Fall River mill owner who wanted a direct route to Boston that did not require the use of the Boston and Providence Railroad lines. The line from South Braintree to Myricks in the town of Berkley opened on December 16, 1846, as an extension of the Fall River Branch Railroad – which had been completed in 1845.

On May 19, 1847, the first "boat train" left the OC's Kneeland Street Station in Boston bound for Fall River, where passengers would board a steamship for New York City. Over the years, the Old Colony Steamboat Express train would become the most famous line of the Old Colony Railroad, with the finest and most up-to-date engines, cars and attention to detail.

In 1863 the Old Colony and Fall River Railroad acquired the Dorchester and Milton Branch Railroad Company, which it had been leasing since 1848.

=== Old Colony and Newport Railway (1863–1872) ===
The Old Colony and Newport Railway was formed in July 1863 when the Old Colony and Fall River Railroad merged with the Newport and Fall River Railroad, which had been incorporated in 1846 to build a road from Newport, Rhode Island to the Massachusetts state line at Fall River. However, the road from Fall River to the Rhode Island state line was not authorized by the Commonwealth of Massachusetts until 1860. The newly formed and renamed Old Colony and Newport Railway Company completed the final section of the line from Fall River to Newport which finally opened for service on February 5, 1864.

In 1865, the Old Colony and Newport Railway Company acquired the Dighton and Somerset Railroad. It completed a new, more direct route between Fall River and Boston via South Braintree on September 24, 1866. Part of the new route was over the Easton Branch Railroad between Stoughton and North Easton. In 1871 the Old Colony purchased the Easton Branch.

A portion of the old Granite Railway line was acquired in 1870 and later extended to form a loop through West Quincy off the original Plymouth line. In 1872, the Old Colony & Newport Railway Corporation built the Shawmut Railroad as a connection between the Dorchester and Milton Branch and the main line to Boston.

=== Old Colony Railroad (1872–1893) ===
The Old Colony and Newport Railway merged with the Cape Cod Railroad on May 1, 1872, and the two companies were consolidated on October 1, forming a new Old Colony Railroad Company under the leadership of Onslow Stearns, who served as president of the company from 1866 to 1877.

The 1872 merger formed a system with three main branches; Boston to Plymouth, South Braintree to Fall River and Newport, and a third splitting from the Newport branch at Middleborough to Hyannis. At this point, the newly acquired lines became known as the Cape Cod Division, with a new superintendent's office located at Hyannis.

The Cape Cod Railroad Company had been established in 1846 as the Cape Cod Branch Railroad with a line off the Fall River Railroad from Middleborough to Sandwich opening in 1848. Among the proponents of the Cape Cod Branch Railroad was Richard Borden of Fall River, who saw the new line as an opportunity to bring more traffic and business through his hometown.In 1853, the extension of the line to Hyannis was started, reaching West Barnstable on December 22, 1853. On February 22, 1854, the Cape Cod Branch Railroad was renamed the Cape Cod Railroad Company. In the spring of 1854, construction continued, with the railroad reaching Barnstable village on May 8, Yarmouth Port on May 19, and finally Hyannis on July 8, 1854. Connecting steamboat service to Nantucket commenced from Hyannis in late September and would continue until 1872, when the railroad branch to Woods Hole was opened.

The Cape Cod Central Railroad was incorporated in 1861 as a branch from the Cape Cod Railroad, running from Yarmouth east and northeast to Orleans, and opening in 1865. The Cape Cod Central was purchased by the Cape Cod Railroad April 21, 1868, and the two railroads were consolidated on July 28, 1868.

The newly formed Old Colony Railroad extended the line to Provincetown, at the very tip of Cape Cod, opening on July 23, 1873.

In 1874, Old Colony founded the Martha's Vineyard Railroad, built across nine miles (14.5 km) on sand of the island of Martha's Vineyard, running from the Oak Bluffs steamer wharf to Mattakeeset Lodge in Katama, Edgartown. The locomotive Active (later renamed the South Beach) was the sole operating train. This branch existed until 1896.

The Old Colony Railroad acquired the Middleborough and Taunton Railroad in 1874 and the South Shore Railroad in 1877, which it had once leased until 1854. A year later in 1878 it acquired the Duxbury and Cohasset Railroad which gave the Old Colony a connection with its original 1845 main line at Kingston. Beginning in 1874, the Old Colony operated the "South Shore, Duxbury and Cohasset and Plymouth Express" between Boston and Plymouth on this line.

In 1875, the Old Colony Railroad began operating the Fall River, Warren and Providence Railroad, which had been formed in 1863 as a merger between the Warren and Fall River and Fall River and Warren Railroad Companies. The Old Colony would later acquire this line outright in 1892.

In 1879, the Old Colony Railroad greatly expanded its network into Central Massachusetts by leasing the Boston, Clinton, Fitchburg and New Bedford Railroad for 999 years, then purchasing it outright in 1883. The acquisition of this line provided important connections for the Old Colony, such as with the Boston and Providence Railroad at Mansfield, the Boston and Albany Railroad at South Framingham and the Fitchburg Railroad at Fitchburg, among others. This deal also gave the Old Colony Railroad direct access to the important industrial port of New Bedford. Upon this acquisition, the lines of the former Boston, Clinton and Fitchburg Railroad became known as the Old Colony's "Northern Division", with headquarters in Fitchburg, while the older OCRR lines became known as the "Central Division" with headquarters in Boston.

In 1882 the Old Colony Railroad signed a 99-year lease on a line between Fall River and New Bedford through the towns of Dartmouth and Westport owned by the Fall River Railroad (1874) – not to be confused with its 1846 namesake.

In 1886 the Old Colony Railroad acquired the Lowell and Framingham Railroad, which before 1871 had been known as the Framingham and Lowell Railroad.

In 1887 the Old Colony Railroad acquired the Hanover Branch Railroad. On April 1, 1888, the Old Colony Railroad signed a 99-year lease agreement the Nantasket Beach Railroad with service to Hull.

Several days later, on April 7, 1888 the OCRR signed a 99-year lease on the Boston and Providence Railroad, one of New England's earliest railroads, which had been chartered in Massachusetts in 1831 and began service between Providence and Boston in 1835. This major agreement gave the Old Colony Railroad operating rights on the busy double-tracked main line between the two capital cities, along with other branches to Dedham and Stoughton. The deal also included use of the Boston and Providence Railroad's Park Square Station in Boston.

In 1891 the OCRR signed a 99-year lease of the Providence, Warren and Bristol Railroad. In December 1892, the OCRR signed a 99-year lease of the Plymouth and Middleborough Railroad properties. In 1896 the OCRR acquired the Fall River Railroad (1874), which it had been leasing since 1882.

The Old Colony Railroad was an early proponent of decorating the grounds of its train stations. By 1891, the railroad's landscaping division grew tens of thousands of plants annually at greenhouses and nurseries in Halifax.

=== New York, New Haven and Hartford Railroad control (1893–1969) ===
On March 1, 1893, the New York, New Haven and Hartford Railroad (NYNH&H) – commonly known as the New Haven Railroad – leased the entire Old Colony system for 99 years, which by then included the leased Boston and Providence Railroad and everything substantially east of it, as well as long branches northwest to Fitchburg and Lowell. Along with the lease of the New England Railroad in 1898, the 1893 lease arrangement gave the NYNH&H a virtual monopoly on rail transport in southern New England. On September 22, 1895, the New Haven converted all former Old Colony lines from left-hand running to right-hand running.

On April 6, 1902, a new alignment was opened from Broadway to Crescent Avenue station, eliminating a grade crossing of Dorchester Avenue. The former right-of-way was later paved as Old Colony Avenue. With the opening of Boston's South Station in 1899, the Kneeland Street Station was taken over by the Boston and Albany Railroad as a local freight office. It was demolished in 1918 after being deemed unsafe.

By the 1930s, the New Haven's largest freight terminal and only steam locomotive shop were both on the ex-Old Colony system; more passengers entered Boston on Old Colony lines than entered New York on the New Haven. However, during its 1935–47 bankruptcy proceedings, the New Haven attempted to rid itself of unprofitable portions of the Old Colony. The New Haven's bankruptcy trustees rejected the Old Colony lease in June 1936, but were forced to continue operating it under court order. In the 88 stations case, the railroad abandoned 88 stations in Massachusetts and five in Rhode Island on a single day in 1938. The Supreme Court ruled in November 1939 (Palmer v. Massachusetts) that the railroad had not been given proper permission, and 32 of the stations were reopened in 1940. After several attempts to end Old Colony passenger service - including a 1939–41 plan to outright abandon the Boston-area lines - the New Haven continued to operate the service. Whether to incorporate the Old Colony into the New Haven, and whether the Old Colony should be required to continue passenger service, continued to be argued as part of the reorganization.

Increased passenger and freight traffic during World War II lifted the fortunes of the New Haven. The reorganization continued; the railroad was ultimately required to continue Old Colony passenger service unless losses exceeded $850,000 in a single calendar year. The New Haven emerged from bankruptcy on September 11, 1947, and fully acquired the Old Colony a week later; the B&P was kept as a separate New Haven-owned company. Palmer v. Massachusetts had been just one of eight Supreme Court cases generated by the reorganization. Losses on the Old Colony reached the critical value in October 1948; after threatening to discontinue all service, the New Haven cut back to a 26-train peak-only schedule on the Boston Group in March 1949.

Under the 1951–1954 presidency of Frederic C. Dumaine Jr., the New Haven increased passenger service, using new Budd Rail Diesel Cars to reduce costs. Boston service reached 86 trains in April 1954. As losses mounted, Boston-area railroads made major cuts in the late 1950s. All service to Taunton, Fall River, and New Bedford (which used the B&P rather than the Old Colony mainline) ended in 1958. All remaining year-round Old Colony Division service ended on June 30, 1959, after the completion of the Southeast Expressway, though limited seasonal service continued for several more years. The NYNH&H merged into Penn Central in 1969, which in turn merged into Conrail in 1976.

=== History since 1969 ===
Since the early 1970s, Amtrak has provided passenger service from South Station in Boston over the former Boston and Providence lines of the Old Colony Railroad. Since December 2000, Amtrak has also used this line for the Acela Express passenger rail service to Washington, D.C. Between 1986 and 1996 Amtrak also operated regular passenger service between New York City and Hyannis on Cape Cod during the summer months.

With the establishment of Conrail, freight service continued over various portions of the former Old Colony network after 1976. Beginning in 1982, the Bay Colony Railroad provided freight service on various lines which the Commonwealth of Massachusetts had purchased from Conrail, including lines on Cape Cod and in Middlesex County. Since 1999, CSX has provided freight service over several portions of the former Old Colony Railroad network, including lines in Taunton, Fall River, New Bedford and Leominster. Since 2008, the Massachusetts Coastal Railroad has taken over operation of the state-owned freight lines on Cape Cod from the Bay Colony Railroad.

The Massachusetts Bay Transportation Authority (MBTA) was formed in 1964 to subsidize remaining commuter rail operations. Service was continued on the ex-B&P lines – now the Providence/Stoughton Line and portions of the Needham Line. The MBTA Commuter Rail system has been expanded since the 1980s. Service was restored on the Plymouth/Kingston Line (now the Kingston Line) and Middleborough/Lakeville Line (now the Fall River/New Bedford Line) – collectively known as the Old Colony Lines – in 1997, and on the Greenbush Line in 2007. Seasonal CapeFlyer excursion service between Boston and Hyannis, operated by the MBTA, began in 2013. The Fall River/New Bedford Line opened as an extension of the Middleborough/Lakeville Line in 2025.

Two portions of the former Old Colony network are used for tourist trains: the Cape Cod Central Railroad on Cape Cod, and the Newport and Narragansett Bay Railroad on Aquidneck Island. Between 1986 and 2016, the Old Colony & Fall River Railroad Museum operated in Fall River. The museum had four train cars and exhibits.

== Presidents of the Old Colony Railroad ==
- John Sever (June 1844 to December 1845)
- Nathan Carruth (December 1845 to January 1848)
- Elias Hasket Derby (January 1848 to April 1850)
- Francis B. Crowninshield (April 1850 to June 1854)
- Alexander Holmes (June 1854 to July 1866)
- Onslow Stearns (July 1866 to November 1877)
- Charles F. Choate (November 1877 to April 1907)

== Lines and branches ==
The following is a description of the Old Colony Railroad lines and branches at about the time of the 1893 lease to the New York, New Haven and Hartford Railroad, and shortly thereafter.

Line	Segment / Branch	Opened	Length (miles or km)	Built By	Acquired by OCRR	Notes
Plymouth Line (Central Division)	Boston to Plymouth	November 10, 1845	36.8 mi or 59.2 km	Old Colony Railroad Corporation	1845	Line completed 0.5-mile (0.8 km) from South Boston to Boston on June 19, 1847 with the opening of Kneeland Street Station; line between Boston and South Braintree doubled in 1848; line now part of MBTA Red Line to Braintree, MBTA Plymouth commuter rail Line, ending in North Plymouth
Plymouth Line (Central Division)	Whitman to Bridegwater Junction	June 21, 1847	6.2 mi or 10.0 km	Old Colony Railroad Corporation	1847	Connection with Fall River Railroad. Much of the line was abandoned in 1937, with the remainder later.
Plymouth Line (Central Division)	Neponset to Mattapan	December 1, 1847	3.3 mi or 5.3 km	Dorchester and Milton Branch Railroad Company	1848	leased/operated by Old Colony Railroad from 1848 to 1863; merged in 1863
Plymouth Line (Central Division)	Granite Branch	October 7, 1826	1.8 mi or 2.9 km	Granite Railway Company	1871	lines extended in 1873 and 1876 by Old Colony Railroad to connect with Plymouth line, forming a loop to West Quincy and East Milton This line has been abandoned
Plymouth Line (Central Division)	Shawmut Branch	December 2, 1872	2.2 mi or 3.5 km	Shawmut Branch Railroad	1872	The MBTA bought the whole Shawmut Branch and part of the Dorchester and Milton Branch in 1926, using the rights-of-way for their Dorchester Extension and Ashmont–Mattapan High-Speed Line, now two parts of the MBTA Red Line.
Plymouth Line (Central Division)	Braintree to Cohasset	January 1, 1849	11.5 mi or 18.5 km	South Shore Railroad Company	1877	leased by Old Colony Railroad from 1849 to 1854; now part of MBTA Greenbush commuter rail line
Plymouth Line (Central Division)	Westdale to Elmwood	April 1, 1885	0.75 mi or 1.21 km	Old Colony Railroad	1885	short connector between Fall River-Middleborough line and Bridgewater-Whitman line
Plymouth Line (Central Division)	Hanover Branch	July 18, 1868	7.8 mi or 12.6 km	Hanover Branch Railroad	1887	continued to carry freight to a wood box factory in West Hanover into the 1960s this line has been abandoned
Plymouth Line (Central Division)	Matfield Junction to Easton	January 1, 1888	7.6 mi or 12.2 km	Old Colony Railroad Company	1888	also known as the West Bridgewater Branch, connected Fall River and D&S mainlines
Plymouth Line (Central Division)	Nantasket Beach Branch	July 10, 1880	7.0 mi or 11.3 km	Nantasket Beach Railroad	1888	leased to Old Colony Railroad from April 1, 1888; deeded outright to OCRR February 24, 1906; The Nantasket Beach Branch of the New York, New Haven and Hartford railway had the first electric train in the U.S. It had its first run on Sunday, June 30, 1895. This line has been abandoned
Plymouth Line (Central Division)	Union Freight Railroad		2.2 mi or 3.5 km			
Plymouth Line (Central Division)	Plymouth to Middleborough	November 30, 1892	15.0 mi or 24.1 km	Plymouth and Middleborough Railroad	1892	this line has been abandoned
Plymouth Line (Central Division)	Cohasset to South Duxbury	1871	17.5 mi or 28.2 km	Duxbury and Cohasset Railroad	1904	line now part of MBTA Greenbush commuter rail line; other parts have been abandoned
Plymouth Line (Central Division)	South Duxbury to Kingston	1874	3.2 mi or 5.1 km	Duxbury and Cohasset Railroad	1904	this line has been abandoned
Fall River & Newport Lines (Central Division)	South Braintree to Myricks	December 31, 1846	30.5 mi or 49.1 km	Fall River Railroad (1846)	1854	consolidation of Randolph and Bridgewater Railroad with Middleborough Railroad and Fall River Branch Railroad; this line now used by MBTA Middleborough/Lakeville commuter rail line; portion between Middleborough and Myricks has been abandoned
Fall River & Newport Lines (Central Division)	Myricks to Fall River	June 9, 1845	10.8 mi or 17.4 km	Fall River Branch Railroad	1854	still used by Mass Coastal Railroad for freight; sold to Commonwealth of Massachusetts in 2010 for planned South Coast Rail project, restoring passenger rail to Fall River for the first time since 1958.
Fall River & Newport Lines (Central Division)	Fall River to Newport	February 5, 1864	19.0 mi or 30.6 km	Old Colony and Newport Railway Company	1864	segment completed after 1863 merger of Newport and Fall River Railroad Company with Old Colony and Fall River Railroad Company this line has been abandoned
Fall River & Newport Lines (Central Division)	Mayflower Park (Braintree Highlands) to Somerset Junction (Fall River)	September 24, 1866	32.8 mi or 52.8 km	Dighton and Somerset Railroad	1866	utilized part of Easton Branch Railroad between Stoughton and North Easton
Fall River & Newport Lines (Central Division)	Stoughton to North Easton	May 16, 1855	3.8 mi or 6.1 km	Easton Branch Railroad Company	1869	operated by Boston and Providence Railroad from 1855 to 1856; operated by Old Colony and Newport Railway from 1866 to 1871
Fall River & Newport Lines (Central Division)	Middleborough to Taunton	July 4, 1856	8.0 mi or 12.9 km	Middleborough and Taunton Railroad Corporation	1874	originally Taunton and Middleborough Railroad Corporation, name changed in 1853 before line built; still used by CSX for freight; part of the planned South Coast Rail Project Phase 1
Fall River & Newport Lines (Central Division)	Warren to Fall River	1875	8.0 mi or 12.9 km	Fall River, Warren and Providence Railroad Company	1875	completed from Warren to Somerset by April, 1875; extended to Fall River with opening of Slade's Ferry Bridge; operated by Old Colony Railroad from December 1, 1865; deeded to Old Colony Railroad in 1892. This line has been abandoned
Fall River & Newport Lines (Central Division)	Whittenton Branch	September 10, 1882	2.5 mi or 4.0 km	Old Colony and Newport Railroad Company	1882	first 0.8-mile (1.3 km) segment from Taunton Branch Railroad line to Whittenton Mills opened in 1881; connected to Mayflower Park-Somerset line at Raynham in 1882; allowed Somerset line trains to stop at Taunton Central Station, instead of Dean Street Station, east of downtown Taunton. This branch has been abandoned
Cape Cod Division	Middleborough to Wareham	January 26, 1848	14.7 mi or 23.7 km	Cape Cod Branch Railroad Company	1872	name change to Cape Cod Railroad in 1854
Cape Cod Division	Wareham to Sandwich	May 29, 1848	12.9 mi or 20.8 km	Cape Cod Branch Railroad Company	1872	name change to Cape Cod Railroad in 1854
Cape Cod Division	Sandwich to Hyannis	July 8, 1854	16.7 mi or 26.9 km	Cape Cod Railroad Company	1872	name changed from Cape Cod Branch Railroad on February 22, 1854
Cape Cod Division	Yarmouth to Orleans	December 1, 1865	18.7 mi or 30.1 km	Cape Cod Central Railroad Company	1872	now part of Cape Cod Rail Trail
Cape Cod Division	Buzzards Bay to Woods Hole	July 20, 1872	17.5 mi or 28.2 km	Old Colony Railroad	1872	section from North Falmouth to Woods Hole is now the Shining Sea Bikeway
Cape Cod Division	Orleans to Wellfleet	December 29, 1870	11.6 mi or 18.7 km	Cape Cod Railroad Company	1872	now part of Cape Cod Rail Trail
Cape Cod Division	Wellfleet to Provincetown	July 23, 1873	14.3 mi or 23.0 km	Old Colony Railroad Company	1873	this segment of line has been abandoned
Cape Cod Division	Harwich to Chatham	November 21, 1887	7.1 mi or 11.4 km	Chatham Railroad Company	1905	Acquired by New York, New Haven and Hartford Railroad in 1905
Cape Cod Division	West Wareham to Fairhaven	October 2, 1854	15.9 mi or 25.6 km	Fairhaven Branch Railroad	1879	deeded to New Bedford and Taunton Railroad in 1861; leased in 1879 by OCRR and merged in 1883 with the Boston, Clinton, Fitchburg and New Bedford Railroad; also included ferry from New Bedford to Fairhaven. This branch is part of the Phoenix Bike Trail and Mattapoisett Rail Trail
Cape Cod Division	Martha's Vineyard Railroad	August 7, 1874	9.0 mi or 14.5 km	Martha's Vineyard Railroad	1892	sold to Old Colony Steamboat Company in 1892, closed in 1896
Taunton & New Bedford Lines	Mansfield to Taunton	August 1836	10.9 mi or 17.5 km	Taunton Branch Railroad	1883	operated by Old Colony Railroad from 1879 to 1883 by lease from Boston, Clinton, Fitchburg and New Bedford Railroad; also Weir Branch, opened in 1840 with New Bedford and Taunton Railroad This line has been abandoned
Taunton & New Bedford Lines	Taunton to New Bedford	July 2, 1840	20.0 mi or 32.2 km	New Bedford and Taunton Railroad	1883	operated by Old Colony Railroad from 1879 to 1883 by lease from Boston, Clinton, Fitchburg and New Bedford Railroad; passenger service ended in 1958
Taunton & New Bedford Lines	Taunton to Attleborough	August 1, 1871	5.6 mi or 9.0 km	Taunton Branch Railroad	1883	operated by Old Colony Railroad from 1879 to 1883 by lease from Boston, Clinton, Fitchburg and New Bedford Railroad
Taunton & New Bedford Lines	New Bedford to Fall River	December 16, 1875	12.4 mi or 20.0 km	Fall River Railroad (1874)	1896	leased by Old Colony Railroad from 1882 to 1893
Northern Division	Mansfield to Framingham	May 1, 1870	22.1 mi or 35.6 km	Mansfield and Framingham Railroad	1883	operated by Old Colony Railroad from 1879 to 1883 by lease from Boston, Clinton, Fitchburg and New Bedford Railroad
Northern Division	Framingham to Northborough	December 1, 1855	13.2 mi or 21.2 km	Agricultural Branch Railroad	1883	operated by Old Colony Railroad from 1879 to 1883 by lease from Boston, Clinton, Fitchburg and New Bedford Railroad
Northern Division	Northborough to Pratts Junction	July 1866	14.0 mi or 22.5 km	Agricultural Branch Railroad	1883	operated by Old Colony Railroad from 1879 to 1883 by lease from Boston, Clinton, Fitchburg and New Bedford Railroad
Northern Division	Fitchburg to Sterling Junction	February 11, 1850	18.7 mi or 30.1 km	Fitchburg and Worcester Railroad	1883	operated by Old Colony Railroad from 1879 to 1883 by lease from Boston, Clinton, Fitchburg and New Bedford Railroad
Northern Division	Marlborough Branch	June 1855	1.5 mi or 2.4 km	Agricultural Branch Railroad	1883	operated by Old Colony Railroad from 1879 to 1883 by lease from Boston, Clinton, Fitchburg and New Bedford Railroad
Northern Division	Framingham to Lowell	October 1, 1871	26.1 mi or 42.0 km	Framingham and Lowell Railroad	1886	later operated by Conrail and Bay Colony Railroad into the 1990s; now being converted into the Bruce Freeman Rail Trail
Boston & Providence; Division	Boston to Readville	June 4, 1834	8.1 mi or 13.0 km		1888	
Boston & Providence; Division	Readville to Providence (India Point)	August 1835	33.4 mi or 53.8 km			
Boston & Providence; Division	Seekonk Branch	1838	0.25 mi or 0.40 km	Seekonk Branch Railroad Company	1888	
Boston & Providence; Division	Readville to Dedham	June 1842	2.1 mi or 3.4 km		1888	
Boston & Providence; Division	Stoughton Branch	April 7, 1845	3.4 mi or 5.5 km	Stoughton Branch Railroad Company	1888	
Boston & Providence; Division	East Junction to Blackstone River	October 1847	4.0 mi or 6.4 km	Boston and Providence Railroad	1888	
Boston & Providence; Division	Blackstone River to Providence	October 1847	5.4 mi or 8.7 km	Boston and Providence Railroad and Transportation Company	1888	one-half of right of way deeded to Providence and Worcester Railroad in 1853
Boston & Providence; Division	Forest Hills to Dedham	June 1850	5.3 mi or 8.5 km	Boston and Providence Railroad	1888	
Bristol, Attleboro & Wrentham lines	Providence to Bristol	July 12, 1855	14.1 mi or 22.7 km	Providence, Warren and Bristol Railroad Company	1891	leased to the Old Colony Railroad from July 1, 1891; now used for East Bay Bike Path
Bristol, Attleboro & Wrentham lines	Attleborough Branch	1871	4.6 mi or 7.4 km			Attleborough to North Attleborough; became a streetcar line ("Gee Whiz" line) after 1903 when Adamsdale Branch opened and NY, NH&H ended its lease of this line. This line has been abandoned.
Bristol, Attleboro & Wrentham lines	Wrentham Branch (Walpole Junction to North Attleborough)	December 1, 1890	12.8 mi or 20.6 km	Old Colony Railroad	1890	passenger service ended 1939; occasional freight until 1959. This line has been abandoned.
Bristol, Attleboro & Wrentham lines	East Walpole Branch (Walpole Junction to Norwood)	February 15, 1892	5.7 mi or 9.2 km		1896	also known as East Walpole Branch Railroad; connected with the New York and New England Railroad at Norwood
Bristol, Attleboro & Wrentham lines	Adamsdale Branch	June 27, 1903	9.6 mi or 15.4 km		1903	extension of Wrentham Branch from North Attleborough to Adamsdale; connected with Rhode Island and Massachusetts Railroad near state line. This line has been abandoned.

== Archives and records ==
Media related to Old Colony Railroad at Wikimedia Commons

- Old Colony Railroad Company records at Baker Library Special Collections, Harvard Business School
