= Framingham and Lowell Railroad =

Railroad in Middlesex County, Massachusetts

Map

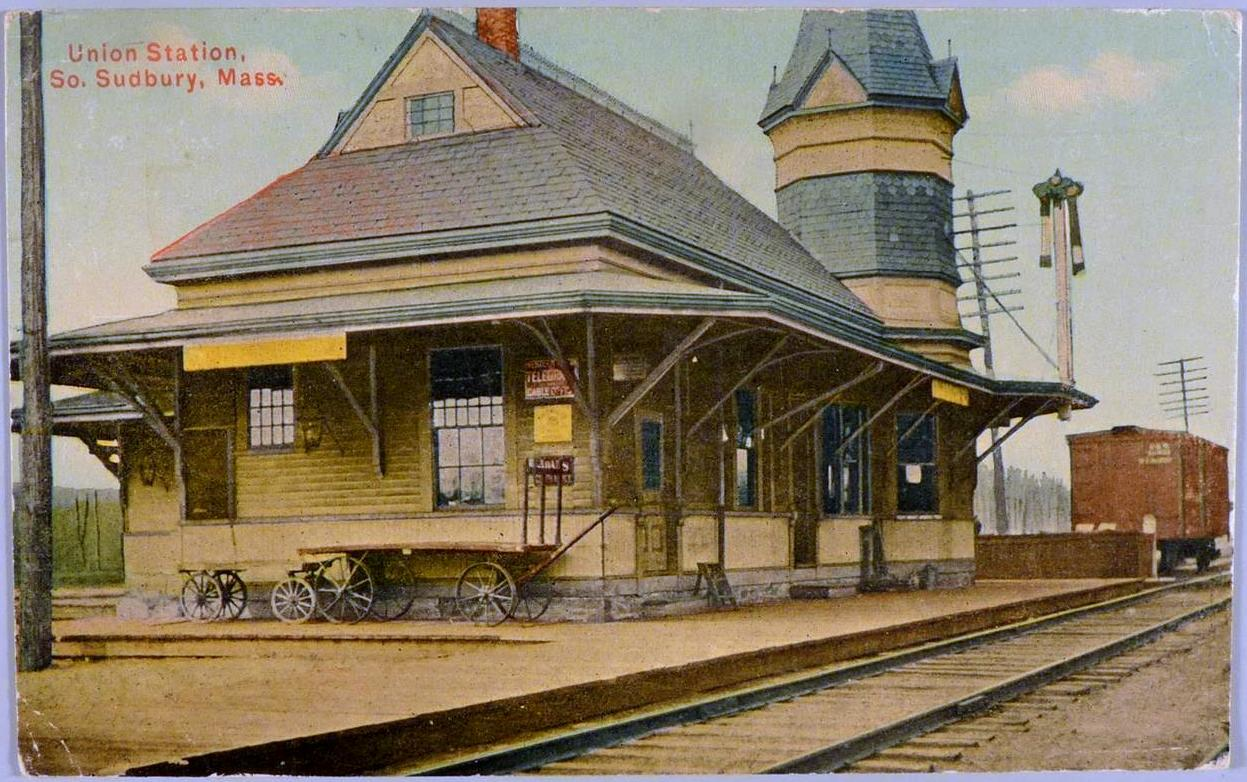
A 1911 postcard of South Sudbury Union Station, the junction with the Central Massachusetts Railroad

The Framingham and Lowell Railroad was a railroad in Middlesex County, Massachusetts. It was incorporated in 1870 to provide a rail connection between the growing railroad hub of Framingham and the important mill city of Lowell, passing through the towns of Sudbury, Concord, Acton, Carlisle, Westford and Chelmsford. The 26.1 mile line opened on October 1, 1871.

On April 1, 1872, the line was leased to the Boston, Clinton and Fitchburg Railroad for twenty years. On June 1, 1876, the Boston, Clinton and Fitchburg Railroad merged with the New Bedford Railroad, forming the Boston, Clinton, Fitchburg and New Bedford Railroad and subsequently extending the lease of the Framingham and Lowell Railroad to 998 years from October 1, 1879. On September 10, 1881, the Framingham and Lowell Railroad was deeded on execution sale to the Boston, Clinton, Fitchburg and New Bedford Railroad, and one month later, on October 5, 1881, it was renamed as the Lowell and Framingham Railroad Company.

On February 27, 1886, the line was consolidated with the Old Colony Railroad, who had previously acquired the Boston, Clinton, Fitchburg and New Bedford Railroad in 1883. The Old Colony Railroad constructed a second track between Concord Junction and Acton Junction in 1891.

In 1893, the Old Colony Railroad was leased to the New York, New Haven and Hartford Railroad. From 1871, passenger service regularly consisted of three round trips a day over the entire route, one morning, one midday and one evening. In 1917 the midday round trip was dropped for additional wartime freight needs; it was never restored. In 1932 service was cut in half, leaving a southbound trip and a northbound trip between Framingham and Lowell. All regular passenger service ended in 1933, although the New Haven Railroad ran northbound ski trains along it through the 1950s.

By the 1960s, the New York, New Haven and Hartford Railroad, like many railroads, was struggling to stay solvent in the face of increased competition from alternate modes of transportation, and so in 1961 it petitioned to be included in the newly formed Penn Central Transportation Company. On December 31, 1968, all of its properties were purchased by Penn Central. Penn Central, however, soon went bankrupt, and on April 1, 1976, it was taken over by Conrail. However, ownership of the former Framingham and Lowell Railroad line was not passed to Conrail, save for a small portion from South Sudbury to Framingham Center, which was named the South Sudbury Industrial Track in 1982; ownership of the line from South Sudbury to Lowell passed to the Commonwealth of Massachusetts, who contracted with Conrail to provide service. During the 1980s the tracks stretching from South Sudbury to Concord Junction were abandoned, and service was contracted to the Bay Colony Railroad to supply the North Acton-based lumber yards from West Concord.

The final railroad owner, CSX Transportation, took over part of the Conrail system in 1999, including one of the only remaining active portions of the Framingham and Lowell Railroad which was the South Sudbury Industrial Track (South Sudbury to Framingham Center, a 4.8 mile segment of the Lowell Secondary between the Central Mass right of way in Sudbury and the active Fitchburg Secondary in Framingham. 1.4 miles of the South Sudbury Industrial Track are in the town of Sudbury and 3.4 miles are in the town of Framingham). Service on the line ended on April 13, 2000, when the last CSX train on the South Sudbury Industrial Track derailed off a West spur which led to a lumber yard in Sudbury; this spur is located immediately South of the junction with the East West Central Mass Branch right of way (the Boston & Maine Railroad was issued a permanent discontinuance of the Central Mass Branch Rail Line in 1980). In June 2001, CSX applied to the federal Surface Transportation Board (STB) for approval to abandon the line. In October 2001, the STB granted CSX the authority to abandon the line, but the town of Sudbury invoked the National Trails System Act to stay the abandonment and negotiate to railbank the corridor for a rail trail. In August 2004, CSX had removed the rails and ties, leaving bridges in place in the event a path were built. By late 2005, all of the grade crossings had been removed by the Massachusetts Highway Department. In December 2020, the town of Sudbury reached a railbanking agreement with CSX. In December 2023, the City of Framingham reached a replacement railbanking agreement with the Georgetown and High Line Railway Company, which had previously reached a railbanking agreement with CSX. Today, the line has become the Bruce Freeman Rail Trail from Lowell to South Sudbury, and the trail conversion of the South Sudbury Industrial Track is in design.

== Station and junction listing ==
Miles (km)	City	Station	Connections and notes
0.0 (0.0)	Lowell	Lowell	Joint station with Boston and Lowell Railroad, Nashua and Lowell Railroad, Lowell and Lawrence Railroad, and Lowell Branch
0.6 (1.0)	Lowell	Junction with Boston and Lowell Railroad - no station	
1.1 (1.8)	Lowell	Junction with Framingham Branch (connector to Lowell Branch) - no station	
3.9 (6.2)	Chelmsford	Chelmsford Center	
6.3 (10.2)	Chelmsford	South Chelmsford (Byams)	
9.0 (14.4)	Westford	Carlisle	
10.8 (17.4)	Acton	North Acton (Nagog)	Junction with NA&B
13.2 (21.2)	Acton	Acton	Joint station with NA&B
15.1 (24.3)	Concord	West Concord (Concord Junction)	Junction with Fitchburg Railroad; south end of Nashua, Acton and Boston Railroad (NA&B)
18.5 (29.8)	Sudbury	North Sudbury (Raymonds)	
20.4 (32.9)	Sudbury	Sudbury	
22.0 (35.4)	Sudbury	South Sudbury	Junction with Central Massachusetts Railroad
24.3 (39.2)	Framingham	Nobscot (North Framingham)	
26.7 (43.0)	Framingham	Framingham Centre (Framingham)	Junction with Agricultural Branch Railroad
