= Fitchburg and Worcester Railroad =

Map

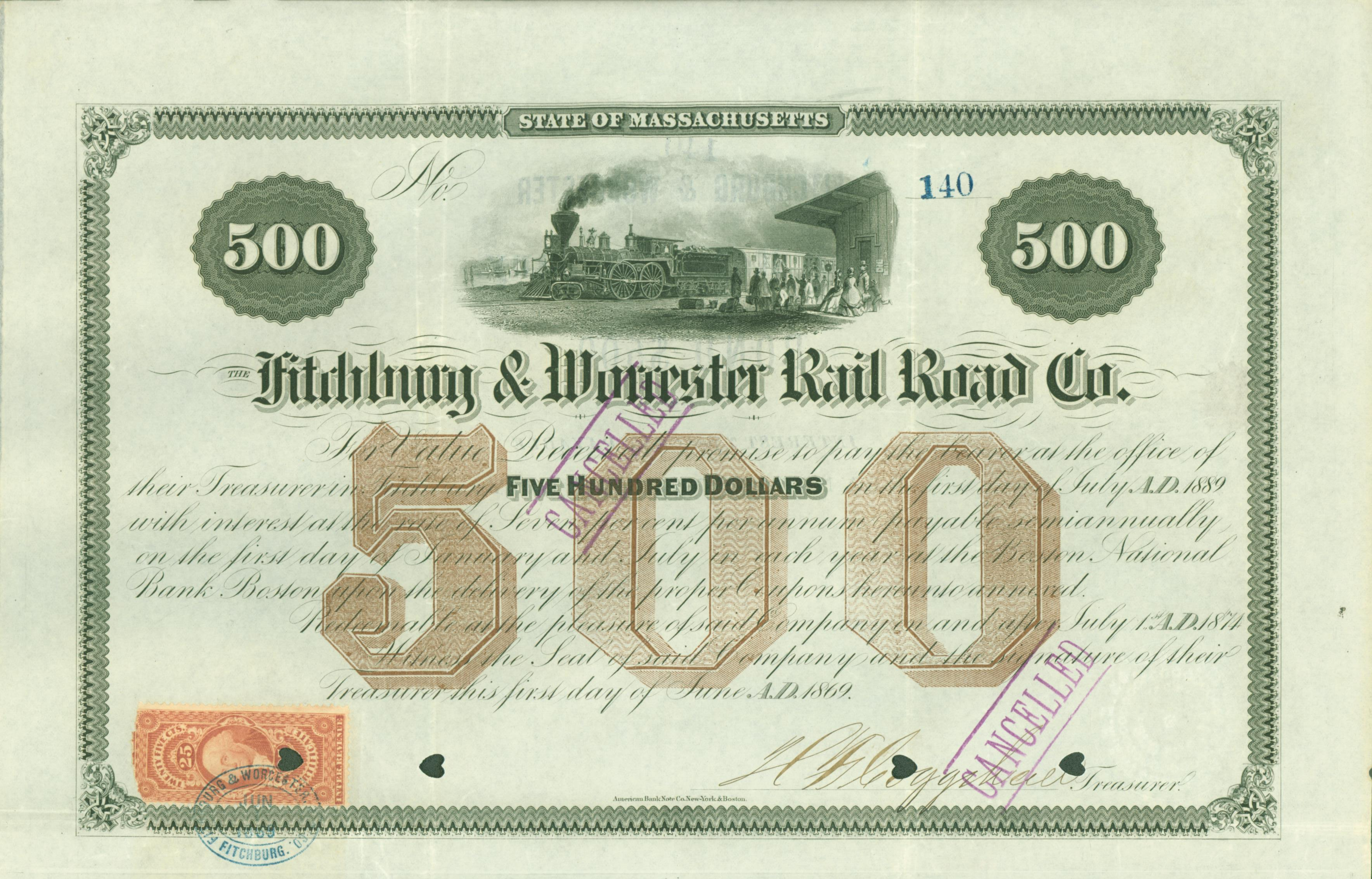
Bond of the Fitchburg & Worcester Rail Road Company, issued 1. June 1869

The Fitchburg and Worcester Railroad was a railroad in Massachusetts. It was incorporated in 1840 to provide a rail connection between Fitchburg and Worcester. Service began on February 11, 1850, running 18 miles from Fitchburg through Leominster and Sterling to Sterling Junction, where it connected with the Worcester and Nashua Railroad.

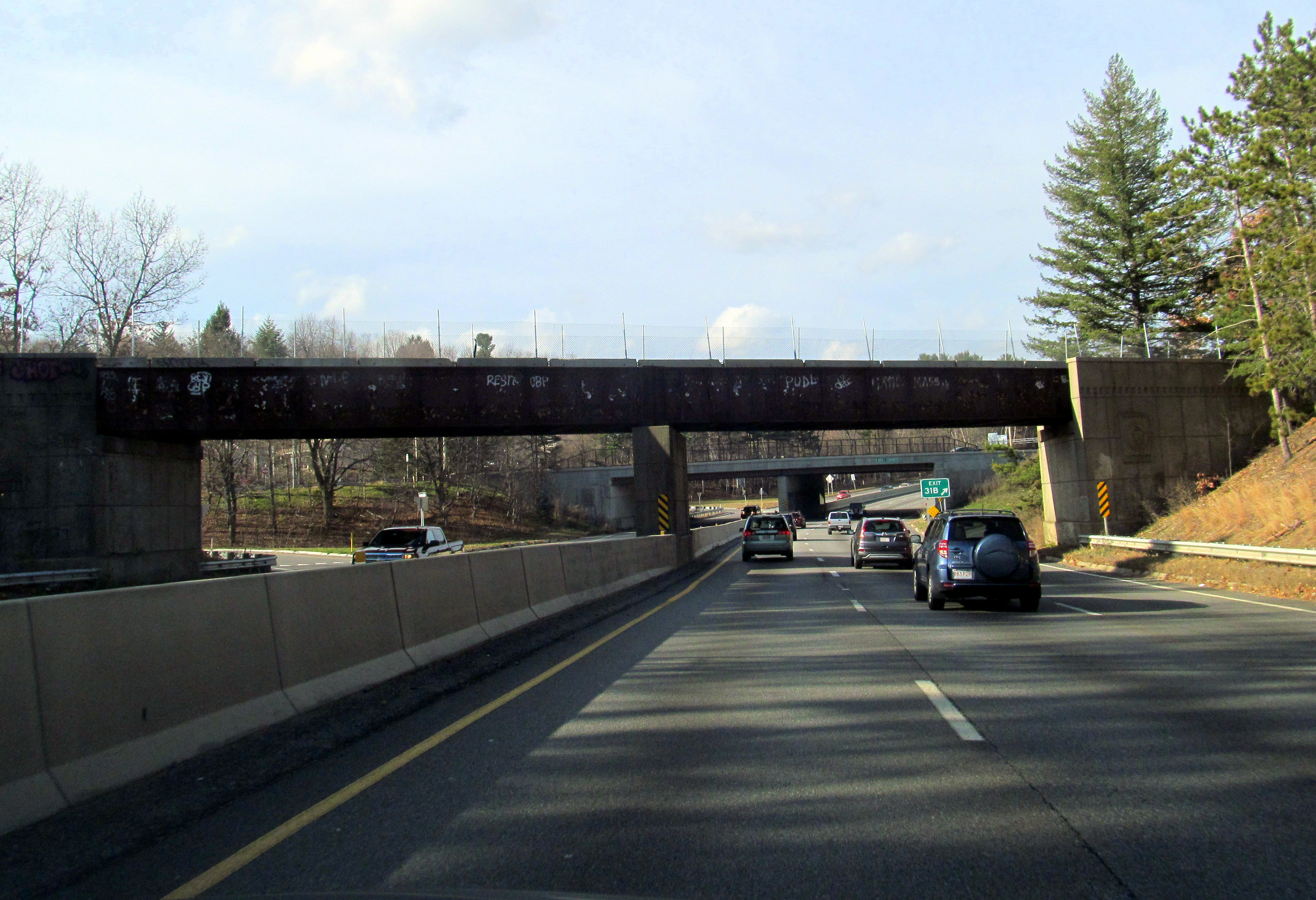
Former bridge over Massachusetts Route 2 in Leominster

In July 1866, the nearby Boston, Clinton and Fitchburg Railroad opened a 14-mile extension of its line from Northborough and joined with the Fitchburg and Worcester Railroad at Pratts Junction in Sterling via the towns of Berlin and Clinton. The two railroads merged in 1869. On June 1, 1876, The Boston, Clinton, and Fitchburg Railroad merged with the New Bedford Railroad to form the Boston, Clinton, Fitchburg and New Bedford Railroad, which was leased to the Old Colony Railroad in 1879 and then consolidated into the Old Colony network on March 5, 1883. The line was double-tracked between Fitchburg and Pratts Junction in 1886.

In 1893, the Old Colony Railroad was leased to the New York, New Haven and Hartford Railroad. By the 1960s, the New York, New Haven and Hartford Railroad, like many railroads, was struggling to stay solvent in the face of increased competition from alternate modes of transportation. In 1961, the New York, New Haven and Hartford Railroad petitioned to be included in the newly formed Penn Central Transportation Company, and on December 31, 1968 all of its properties were purchased by Penn Central. Penn Central, however, soon went bankrupt, and on April 1, 1976 it was taken over by Conrail. On August 22, 1998, the Surface Transportation Board approved the buyout of Conrail by CSX and Norfolk Southern, with the former assuming control of the former Fitchburg and Worcester Railroad line.

Eventually, the tracks between Sterling Junction and Pratts Junction were abandoned and removed. Much of this section has been converted into the Sterling Rail Trail. The tracks between Leominster and Fitchburg have also been abandoned. The portion of the original Fitchburg and Worcester line between Leominster and Pratts Junction is still used by CSX, mainly to haul plastic pellets into Leominster.
