= Framingham Secondary =

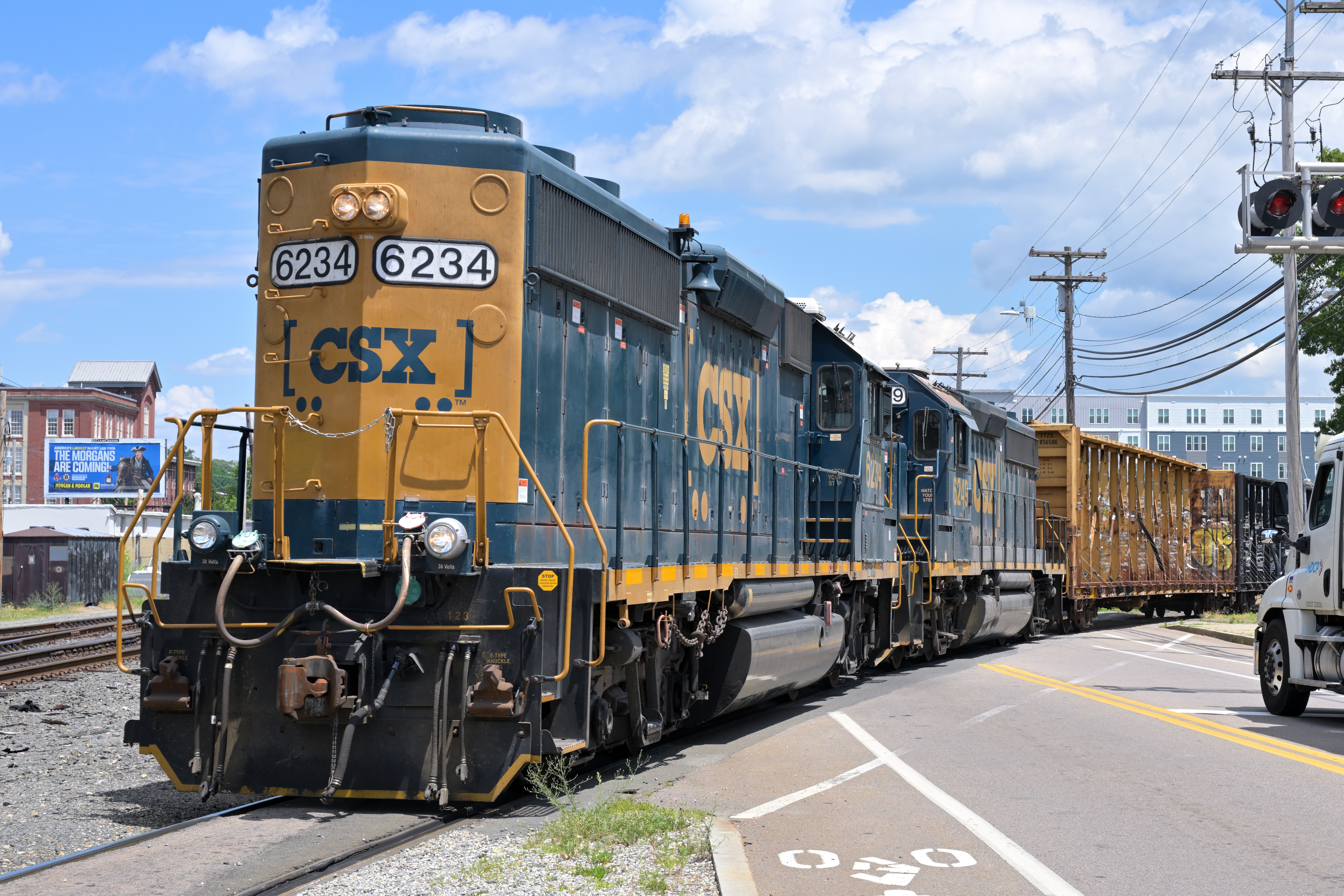
- A freight train in Framingham in 2025

Overview
- Status: Operating
- Owner: MassDOT
- Locale: Massachusetts
- Termini: Framingham; Mansfield
- Stations: 1 active

Technical
- Line length: 21.3 miles (34.3 km)
- Track gauge: 4 ft 8 1/2 in (1,435 mm)

The Framingham Secondary (formerly the Framingham Subdivision) is a railroad line in the U.S. state of Massachusetts. The line runs from Mansfield northwest to Framingham along a former New York, New Haven and Hartford Railroad line. Its south end is at Amtrak's Northeast Corridor, over which CSX has trackage rights to reach the Middleboro Subdivision at Attleboro and the Boston Subdivision in Boston (via the Fairmount Line). Its north end is at the Worcester Main Line.

The line has one MBTA Commuter Rail station at Foxboro. It is served by weekday Franklin/Foxboro Line service as well as special trains for events at Gillette Stadium.

== History ==
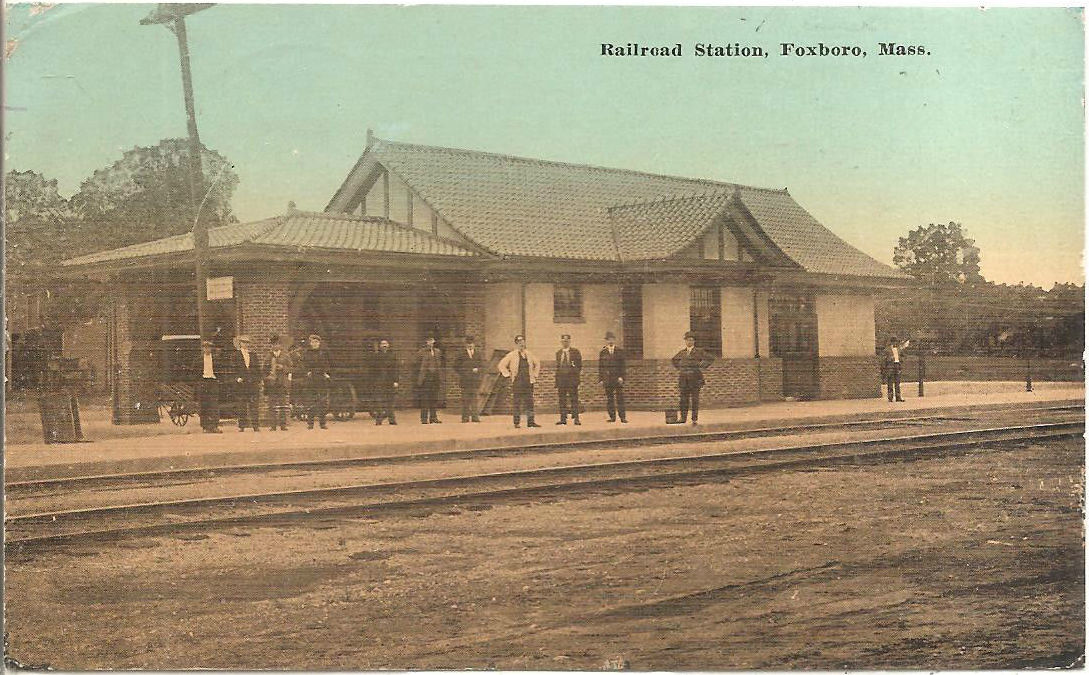
Foxboro station in 1912

The Foxborough Branch Railroad was incorporated in 1862 to provide a rail connection from Mansfield through Foxborough to Walpole. In 1867, it became the Mansfield and Framingham Railroad, with a new charter allowing it to connect to the Boston, Clinton and Fitchburg Railroad and Boston and Worcester Railroad at Framingham. The line was completed on May 1, 1870. On January 1, 1873, it was leased to the Boston, Clinton and Fitchburg Railroad for fifty years, before merging with that railroad on June 1, 1875.

On June 1, 1876, the line became part of the Boston, Clinton, Fitchburg and New Bedford Railroad with the merger of the Boston, Clinton and Fitchburg Railroad with the New Bedford Railroad, forming an overall network of 126.2 miles of track. In 1879, the Boston, Clinton, Fitchburg and New Bedford Railroad was leased to the Old Colony Railroad for 999 years, before being consolidated with the Old Colony in 1883. The line was double-tracked between Walpole and Mansfield in 1886. In 1893, it became part of the New York, New Haven and Hartford Railroad as part of the lease of the entire Old Colony Railroad network.

Passenger service ceased in 1933. The line passed to Penn Central and Conrail, and was assigned to CSX Transportation as its Framingham Subdivision in the 1999 breakup of Conrail. Effective June 17, 2015, the state purchased the line for $23 million with the intent to upgrade it for faster game day service and eventual full-time passenger service. By 2021, 17 miles (27 km) of continuous welded rail had been installed. Regular commuter service to Foxboro ran as a pilot in 2019–2020, resumed in 2022, and became permanent in 2023.

== See also ==
- List of CSX Transportation lines
