= Gross ton mile =

Units of measurement in rail transport

Gross ton mile (GTM), or its related units gross tonne–kilometre and thousand gross tonne mile (kgtm) are units of measurement commonly used in rail transportation. Gross ton kilometre is the product of total weight (including the weight of lading cars and locomotives) and the distance moved by a train.
