= Connecticut Central Railroad =

There have been two companies named the Connecticut Central Railroad:

- Connecticut Central Railroad (1871), formed in 1871, which operated a line between East Hartford, Connecticut, and Springfield, Massachusetts
- Connecticut Central Railroad (1987), formed in 1987, which operated a number of rail lines in and around Middletown, Connecticut
