= GE Dash 8-40B =

Class of diesel-electric locomotives

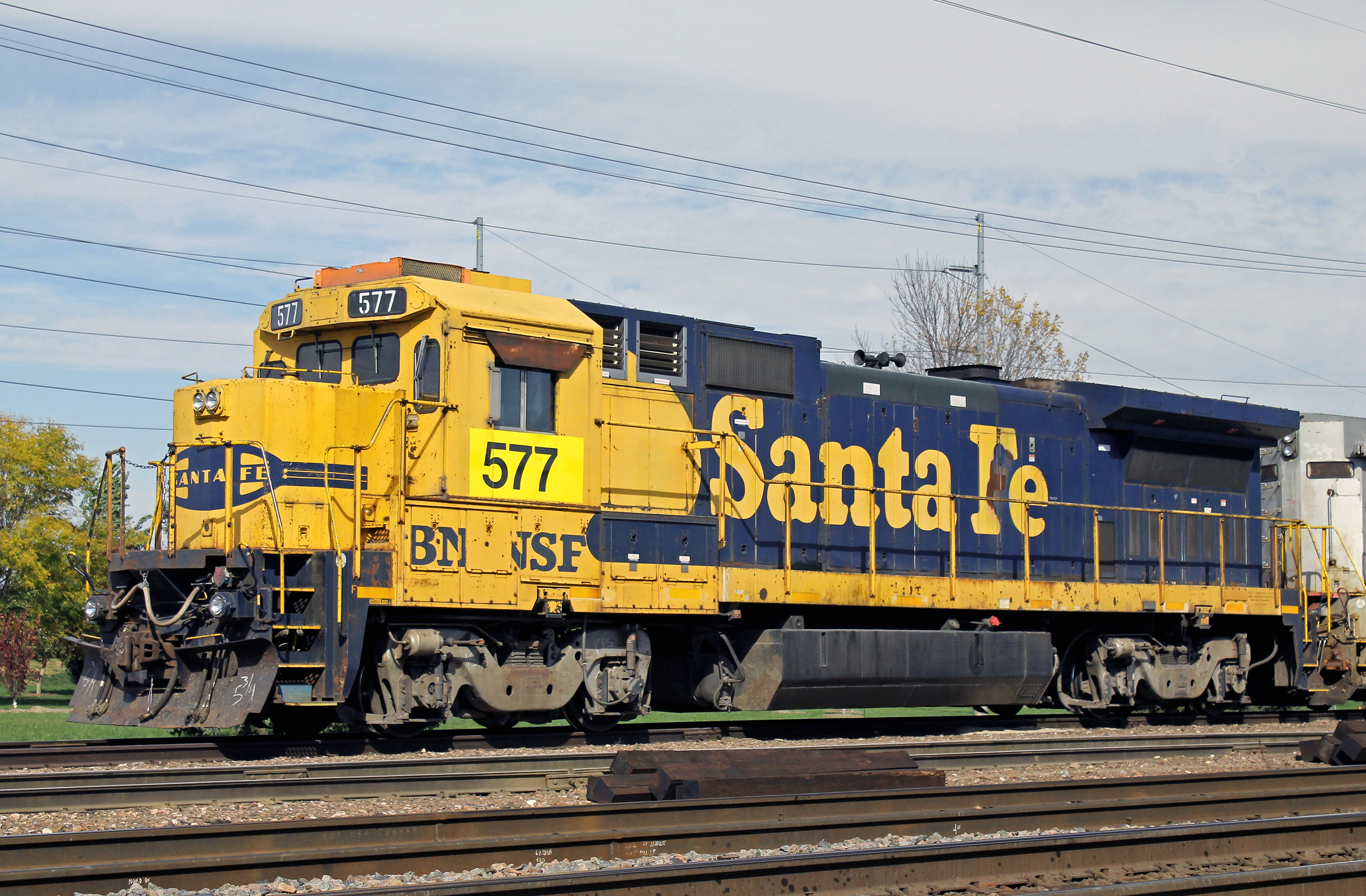
- BNSF B40-8 no. 577 at Havelock, Nebraska, in October 2014
Type and origin
- Power type: Diesel-electric
- Builder: GE Transportation
- Model: Dash 8-40B
- Build date: 1988 – 1989
- Total produced: 151
Specifications
- Configuration
  - AAR: B-B
- Gauge: 4 ft 8 1/2 in (1,435 mm) standard gauge
- Prime mover: GE 7FDL16
Performance figures
- Power output: 4,000 hp (3,000 kW)
Career
- Operators: Various, see list
- Class: B40-8
- Locale: North America

The GE Dash 8-40B (or B40-8) is a 4-axle diesel-electric locomotive built by GE Transportation between 1988 and 1989. It is part of the GE Dash 8 Series of freight locomotives.

A total of 151 examples of this locomotive were built for North American railroads.

The GE Dash 8-40BW (B40-8W) is a variant fitted with a full-width cab. Another variant is the GE Dash 8-40BP, more commonly known as the Genesis series. The locomotives in the Genesis series are the P40DC, the P42DC, and the P32AC-DM.

== Original owners ==
Image	Railroad	Quantity	Road Numbers	Notes
	Atchison, Topeka and Santa Fe Railway	40	7410-7449	to BNSF
	Conrail	30	5060-5089	To NS, later sold to CSXT
	General Electric	1	8002	
	New York, Susquehanna and Western Railway	24	4002-4048 (even nos.)	To CSX Nos. 4004, 4008, 4006, 4002 to P&W
	St. Louis Southwestern Railway	55	8040-8094	To Union Pacific
	United States Department of Energy (Savannah River Site)	1	107	Sold surplus in 2022. Now ATOM Rail 107

== B20-8 ==
The B20-8 is a downgraded version of the B40-8 with a 2000hp engine for smaller operations. It works on railroads such as N&E and other shortlines.

== Preservation ==
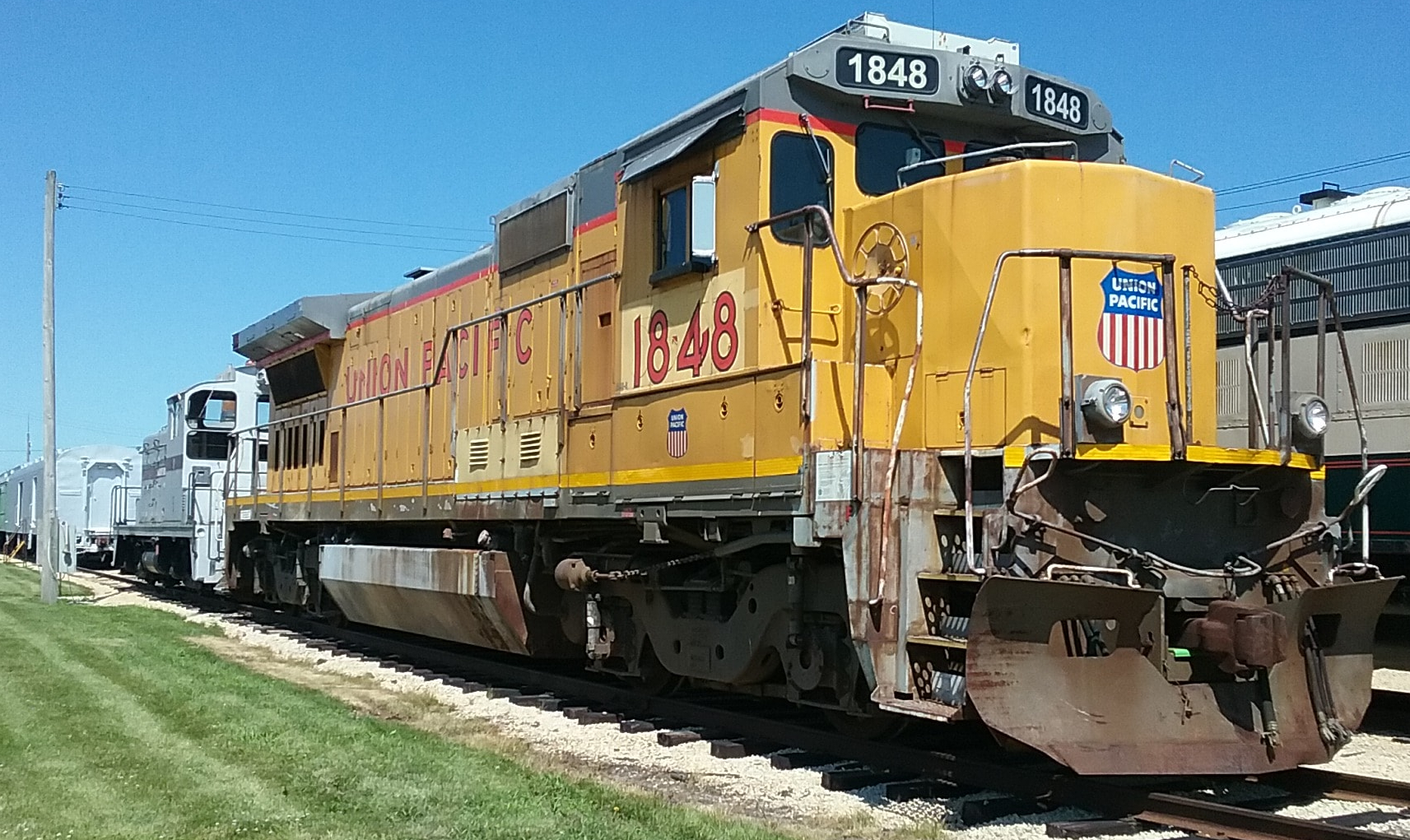
ex-Union Pacific 1848 at the Illinois Railway Museum

- Union Pacific #1848, (ex-St. Louis Southwestern #8049) is preserved at the Illinois Railway Museum in Union, Illinois. It was donated by Union Pacific in 2014.

== See also ==
- List of GE locomotives
