= Uxbridge station (Massachusetts) =

Former railroad station in Uxbridge, Massachusetts

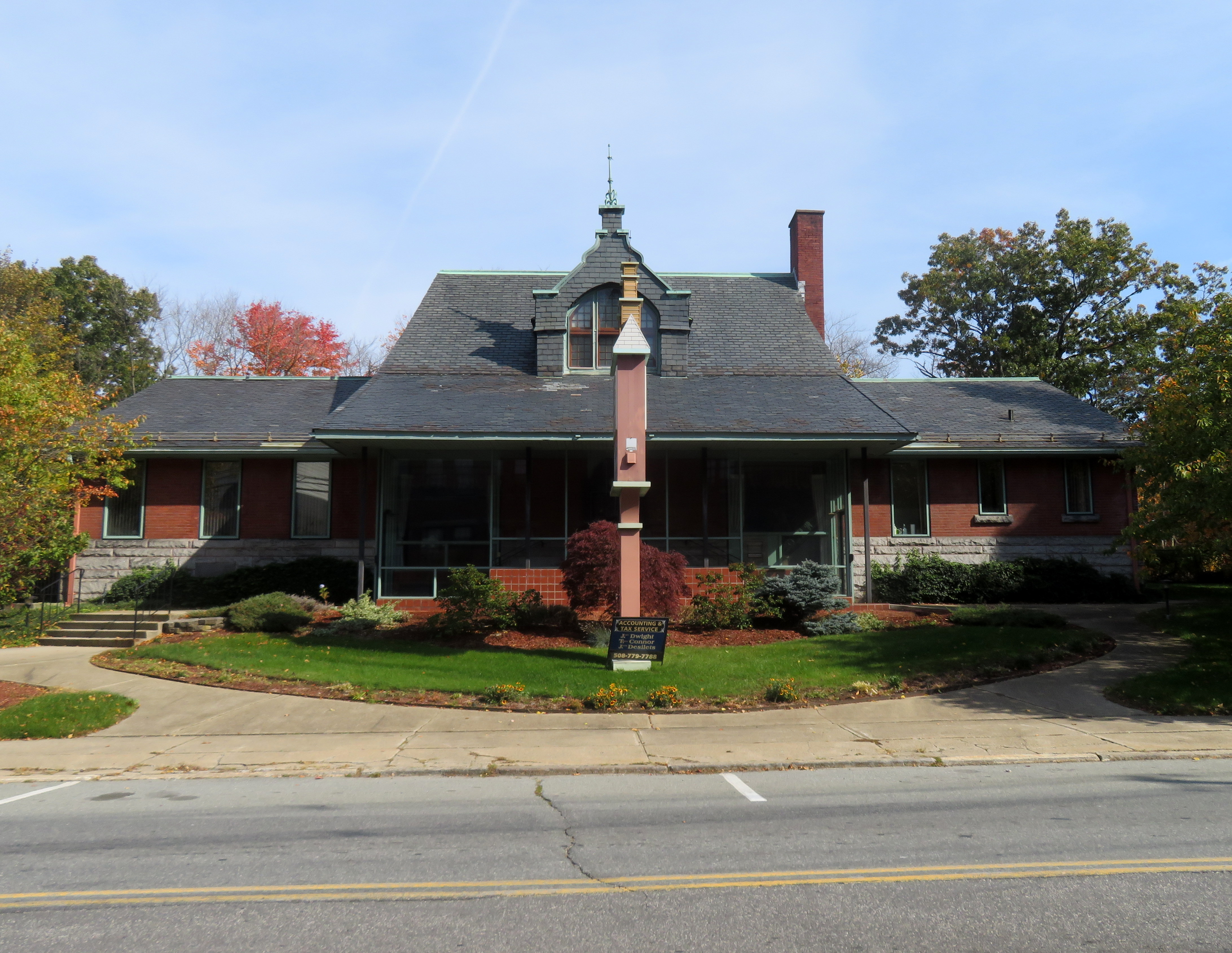
- The former Uxbridge station in October 2020

General information
- Location: 28 South Main Street, Uxbridge, Massachusetts

History
- Opened: 1849; 177 years ago
- Closed: 1953; 73 years ago
- Rebuilt: 1894–1895; 131 years ago
- Uxbridge Passenger Depot
- U.S. National Register of Historic Places
- Coordinates: 42°4′32″N 71°37′44″W
- Built: 1895; 131 years ago
- Architectural style: Queen Anne
- MPS: Uxbridge MRA
- NRHP reference No.: 83004143
- Added to NRHP: October 7, 1983
Location

Uxbridge station is a former railroad station in Uxbridge, Massachusetts. Built in 1895, it is a well preserved example of Queen Anne architecture. On October 7, 1983, it was added to the National Register of Historic Places as Uxbridge Passenger Depot. It served as a significant transportation hub and the town's main passenger station for more than 50 years.

== Description ==
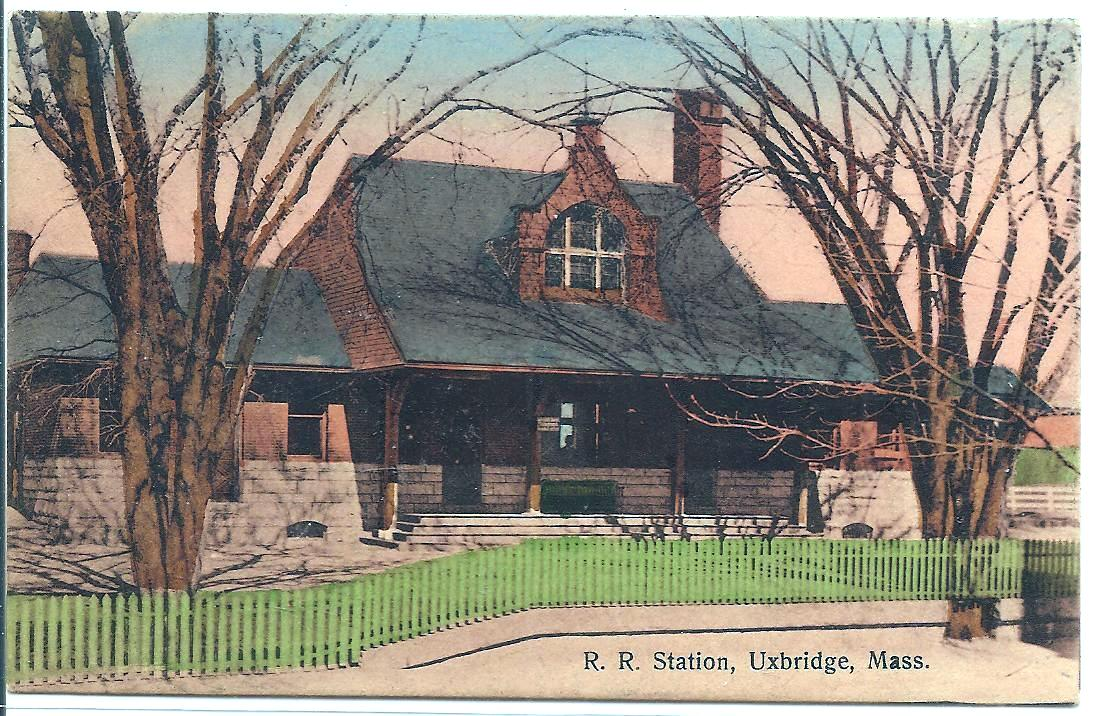
Uxbridge station on an early postcard

The former station is located on the east side of South Main Street in the town center, between the road and the tracks of the Providence and Worcester Railroad. It is a 1 1/2-story brick building with Queen Anne Victorian styling, set on a high granite foundation. It is a long and roughly rectangular structure, with a tall central portion flanked by lower wings. The central section has a large central dormer with a curvilinear gable that has copper trim elements. A shed-roof porch extends across the central section on the street-facing side, while the platform on the track side is sheltered by a recessed porch supported by posts with large brackets.

== History ==
The first passenger and freight depot was built in Uxbridge on this site in 1849 by the Providence and Worcester Railroad. In 1893, the town petitioned for a new station, resulting in the construction of this building, which opened in 1894 and was completed in 1895. It was used for passenger service until service ended in 1960. It served a short time as a bus depot after rail passenger service ceased, and later also served as a bank branch. The freight house, located on a long siding near the Capron Mill, served a propane company for several decades but was demolished around 2020.

== See also ==
- National Register of Historic Places listings in Uxbridge, Massachusetts
