= Providence and Worcester Railroad =

Regional railroad in the Northeastern United States

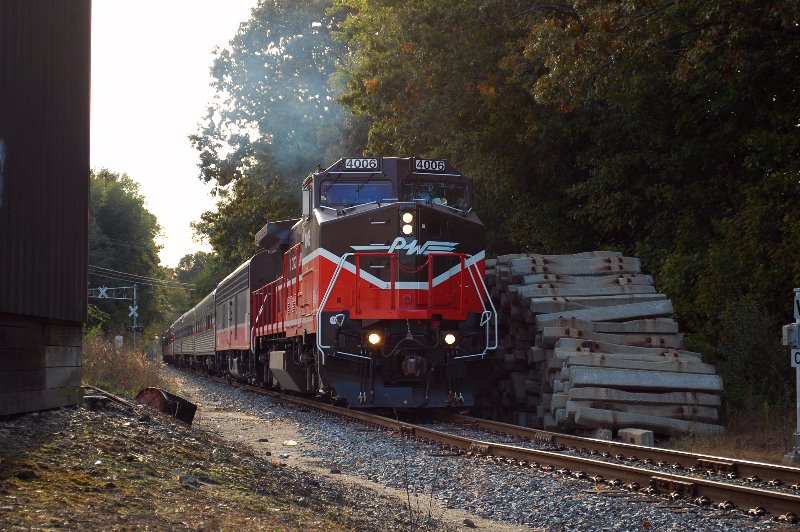
- Providence and Worcester GE B40-8W leads a passenger excursion for railfans at Plainfield, Connecticut in 2012

Overview
- Parent company: Genesee & Wyoming
- Headquarters: 381 Southbridge Street, Worcester, Massachusetts
- Reporting mark: PW, PWRZ
- Locale: Connecticut, Massachusetts, and Rhode Island; New York City and Long Island via trackage rights
- Dates of operation: 1847–

Technical
- Track gauge: 4 ft 8 1/2 in (1,435 mm) standard gauge
- Length: 612 miles (985 km) (including trackage rights)

Other
- Website: Official website

The Providence and Worcester Railroad (P&W; reporting mark PW) is a Class II railroad operating 612 miles (985 km) of tracks in Rhode Island, Massachusetts, and Connecticut, as well as New York via trackage rights. The company was founded in 1844 to build a railroad between Providence, Rhode Island, and Worcester, Massachusetts, and ran its first trains in 1847. A successful railroad, the P&W subsequently expanded with a branch to East Providence, Rhode Island, and for a time leased two small Massachusetts railroads. Originally a single track, its busy mainline was double-tracked after a fatal 1853 collision in Valley Falls, Rhode Island.

The P&W operated independently until 1888, when the New York, Providence and Boston Railroad (NYP&B) leased it; four years later, the New York, New Haven and Hartford Railroad obtained the lease when it purchased the NYP&B. The P&W continued to exist as a company, as special rules protecting minority shareholders made it prohibitively expensive for the New Haven to purchase the company outright. The New Haven continued to lease the Providence and Worcester for 76 years, until the former was merged into Penn Central (PC) at the end of 1968. Penn Central demanded the shareholder rules keeping P&W alive be rewritten, and also threatened to abandon the company's tracks. In response, a group of P&W shareholders launched a fight with PC, asking the Interstate Commerce Commission (ICC) to cancel the lease and let the P&W leave the New Haven's merger and go free. Against expectations, the ICC agreed, and after court battles, P&W prevailed and began operating independently again after 85 years. Upon regaining its independence, the railroad purchased railroad lines from the Boston and Maine Railroad and PC successor Conrail in the 1970s and 1980s. The company turned a profit operating lines bigger companies lost money on, and invested heavily in its infrastructure. P&W also absorbed a number of shortline railroads in Connecticut and Rhode Island.

Entering the 1990s, P&W had expanded to several hundred miles of track. After several of the company's largest customers shut down or ended rail service during this decade, the railroad responded by expanding interchange with other railroads. P&W also signed an agreement to run unit trains of crushed stone from Connecticut quarries to Queens, New York, over the Northeast Corridor. In 2016, the Providence and Worcester was purchased by railroad holding company Genesee & Wyoming, without significant changes to operations.

P&W is headquartered in Worcester, and maintains significant facilities there, in Valley Falls, in Plainfield, Connecticut, and in New Haven, Connecticut. It operates a variety of GE and EMD diesel locomotives. P&W serves major ports in New Haven, Providence, and Davisville, Rhode Island (the latter via a connection to switching-and-terminal railroad Seaview Transportation Company). In addition to the lines it directly owns and operates, P&W freight trains share tracks with Amtrak, Metro-North Railroad, and MBTA Commuter Rail passenger trains on the Northeast Corridor and two Metro-North branches in Connecticut. Key commodities carried by P&W include lumber, paper, chemicals, steel, construction materials and debris, crushed stone, automobiles, and plastics. While the company is primarily a freight railroad, it occasionally has operated passenger excursions since the 1980s, using refurbished passenger cars purchased from Amtrak.

== Original Providence and Worcester Railroad ==
=== Background and founding ===
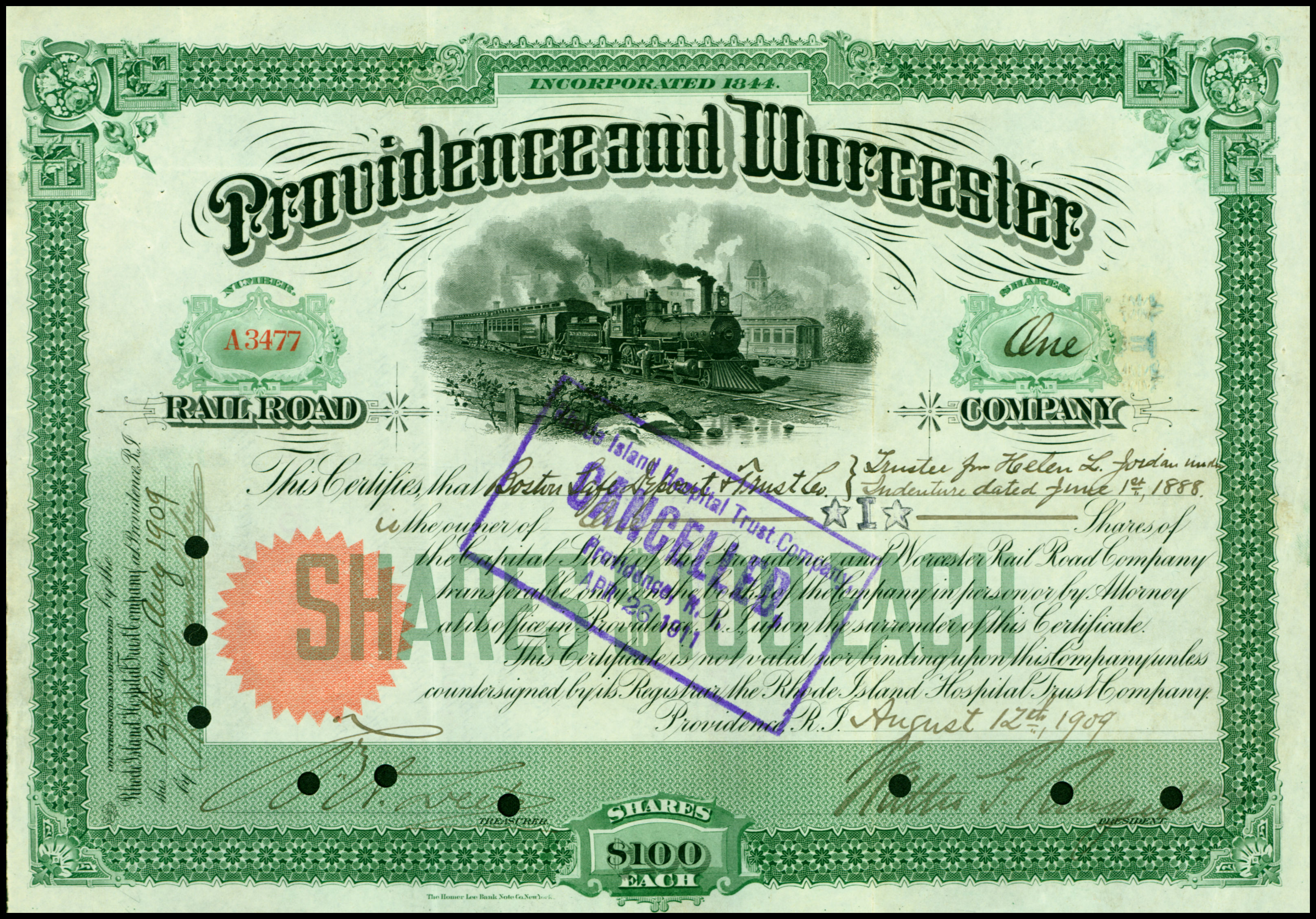
Share of the Providence and Worcester Railroad Company, issued on August 12, 1909

The Providence and Worcester Railroad (P&W) was preceded by the Blackstone Canal, which opened between Providence, Rhode Island, and Worcester, Massachusetts, in 1828. While initially somewhat successful, the canal's business was severely harmed by the completion of the Boston and Worcester Railroad between its namesake cities in 1835, with shippers fleeing the slow and unreliable canal for rail transport. Providence therefore lost much of the business the canal had provided, and residents began to plan a response to the opening of the Boston and Providence. The canal company went bankrupt after its canal was severely damaged by flooding in 1841, and was forced to petition the state of Rhode Island for additional funds. The canal also competed for water with the many mills along the Blackstone Valley, which used water power to operate their machinery. As plans for other railroads across New England began, in January 1844 a group of citizens, primarily from Providence, petitioned the Rhode Island General Assembly for a charter to build a railroad from Providence to the Massachusetts state line. This group also petitioned the Massachusetts General Court for a charter to build in that state from the state line to Worcester.

The railroad was incorporated in Massachusetts as the Providence and Worcester Railway on March 12, 1844, and in Rhode Island as the Providence and Worcester Railroad in May 1844. Two aspects of the charter were unusual. One provision capped the company's maximum dividend at twelve percent; additional profit beyond that amount was to be invested in improving the railroad rather than rewarding shareholders. A second part of the charter heavily curtailed the voting power of larger shareholders – each shareholder got one vote per share for their first fifty shares, but additional shares granted just one vote per twenty shares. In effect, this made it impossible for any one shareholder to control the company, no matter how many shares they owned. Both provisions were designed to ensure the P&W provided effective rail service and remained in the hands of local shareholders.

As their first order of business, the company's founders commissioned engineer Thomas Willis Pratt to complete a survey of the proposed route, which was completed in the fall of that year. The two companies were merged November 25, 1845, as the Providence and Worcester Railroad. The company bought the Blackstone Canal and began construction, partly on its banks, in 1845. The canal was shut down in 1848, shortly after the railroad was completed.

=== Delays in construction ===
Local enthusiasm was high for the new railroad, with one Providence resident quoted as saying "[it is] not so much what will the projected route add to the prosperity of Providence, as can we do without it?" The city's residents feared that without a railroad to connect their city to others, Providence would be reduced in importance compared to other cities in the region. Despite high local support, in July 1845, the railroad was still short $200,000 ($6.91 million in 2025) out of a needed sum of $1,000,000 ($34.6 million in 2025) per the company's charter, and had not begun construction. Residents began to doubt the railroad would ever be built, with one citizen writing in a letter to the editor to a local newspaper that "... any hope of its completion, founded upon the present condition of the corporation, is desperate indeed."

It is scarcely credible that men so alive to their own interests as the people of Providence, should have allowed this route so long to be unoccupied, and still less credible that they should now allow the project to be impeded by the want of $200,000.

—

By September 1845, residents worried over rumors that investors from Boston were planning to build a new railroad between Woonsocket, Rhode Island, and Dedham, Massachusetts, which would not serve Providence. Despite fears the company would fail, it announced on October 8, 1845, that thanks to additional funding, including a $100,000 ($3.46 million in 2025) investment by Jacob Little, the requisite $1,000,000 had been reached, plus a further $100,000 for the Massachusetts section of the line, and that construction would begin immediately. The funding was obtained entirely from private sources.

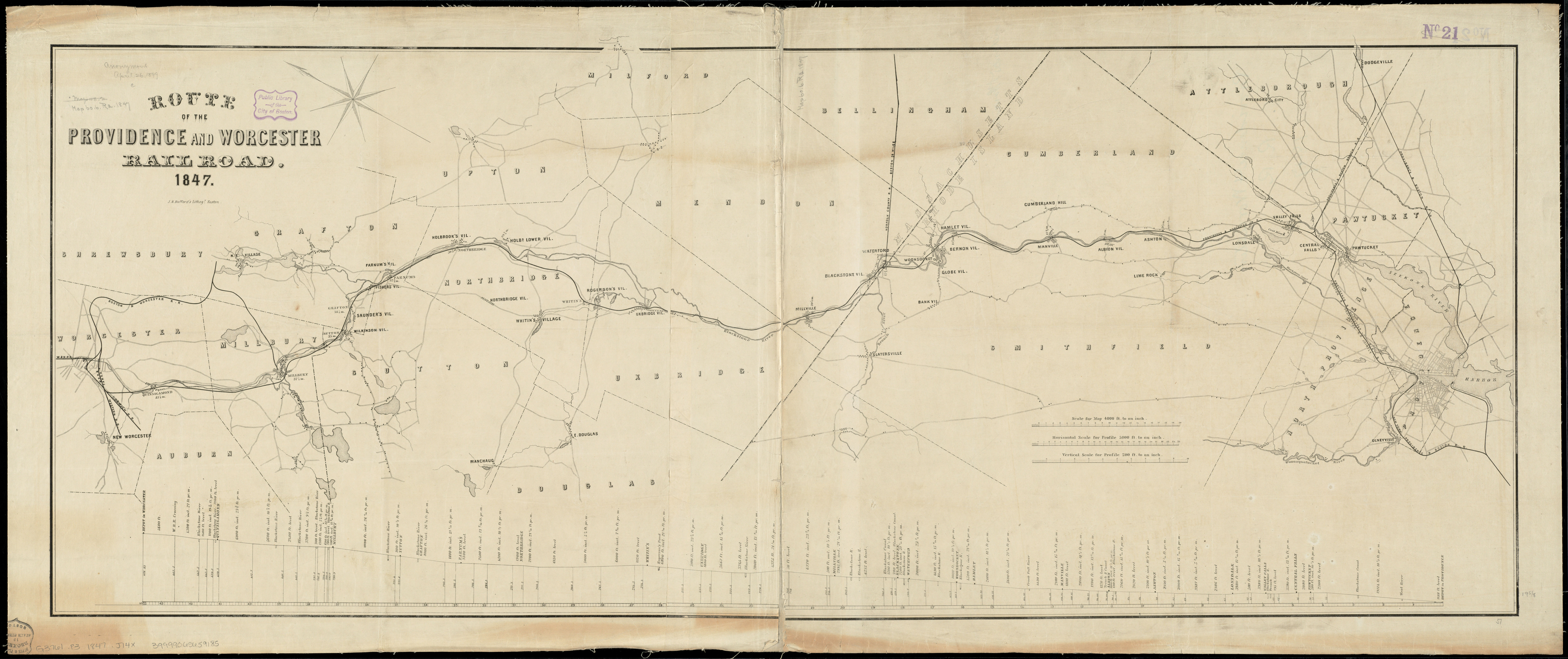
A map of the Providence and Worcester Railroad main line in 1847

=== Construction and operations ===
Map of the Providence and Worcester Railroad as it existed during its first period of independence

Many immigrants helped build the Providence and Worcester Railroad, particularly from Ireland. The line opened in two sections: the part south of Millville on September 27, 1847, and the rest on October 20. The line from Providence to Central Falls was shared with the Boston and Providence Railroad, which at the same time built a connection from its old line (which ended at India Point via East Providence) over to the P&W. The companies shared the P&W-built Providence Union Station, which opened in 1848; the station was also served by New York, Providence and Boston Railroad (commonly known as the Stonington Line) trains. This station was originally planned to be placed over the Great Salt Cove, a large cove in the city; public opposition led by Zachariah Allen convinced the city to preserve the cove and change the station's location.

Construction was more expensive than anticipated, due to difficulties encountered in building earthworks and to the relatively high prices for iron and labor from 1845 to 1847. The company also spent much money on a large depot in Providence. Still, healthy traffic made the company profitable quickly and to the end of its independent operation. The opening of the P&W and other railroads spurred the region's commercial growth; Providence in particular developed textile, jewelry, and metals industries. The P&W, along with the Boston and Providence, were also credited with bringing the city of Pawtucket out of an economic downturn. Mills in the Blackstone Valley found that the railroads offered more reliable and cheaper transportation than canals. Affordable passenger trains also increased the mobility of residents along the railroad, whose line linked the communities along its route to the busy railroad junction in Worcester. To better reach the docks in Providence, tracks were constructed south towards the water along city streets between 1852 and 1853, eventually reaching Fox Point where steamships docked.

In May 1853, the owners of the Norfolk County Railroad (NCR) attempted a hostile takeover of the Providence and Worcester. They wanted to use the P&W to route more traffic along their NCR, which was bankrupt as a result of insufficient business, and so increase the value of NCR stock. They purchased a majority of the P&W stock, paying well above market value for shares, and moved to add ten members to the company's board of directors. But the P&W's president and clerk refused to recognize a vote to approve the new directors, defeating the attempt and leaving the stockholders from the "ricketty and bankrupt" NCR with nothing but $100,000 ($3.87 million in 2025) in debt to show for their efforts.

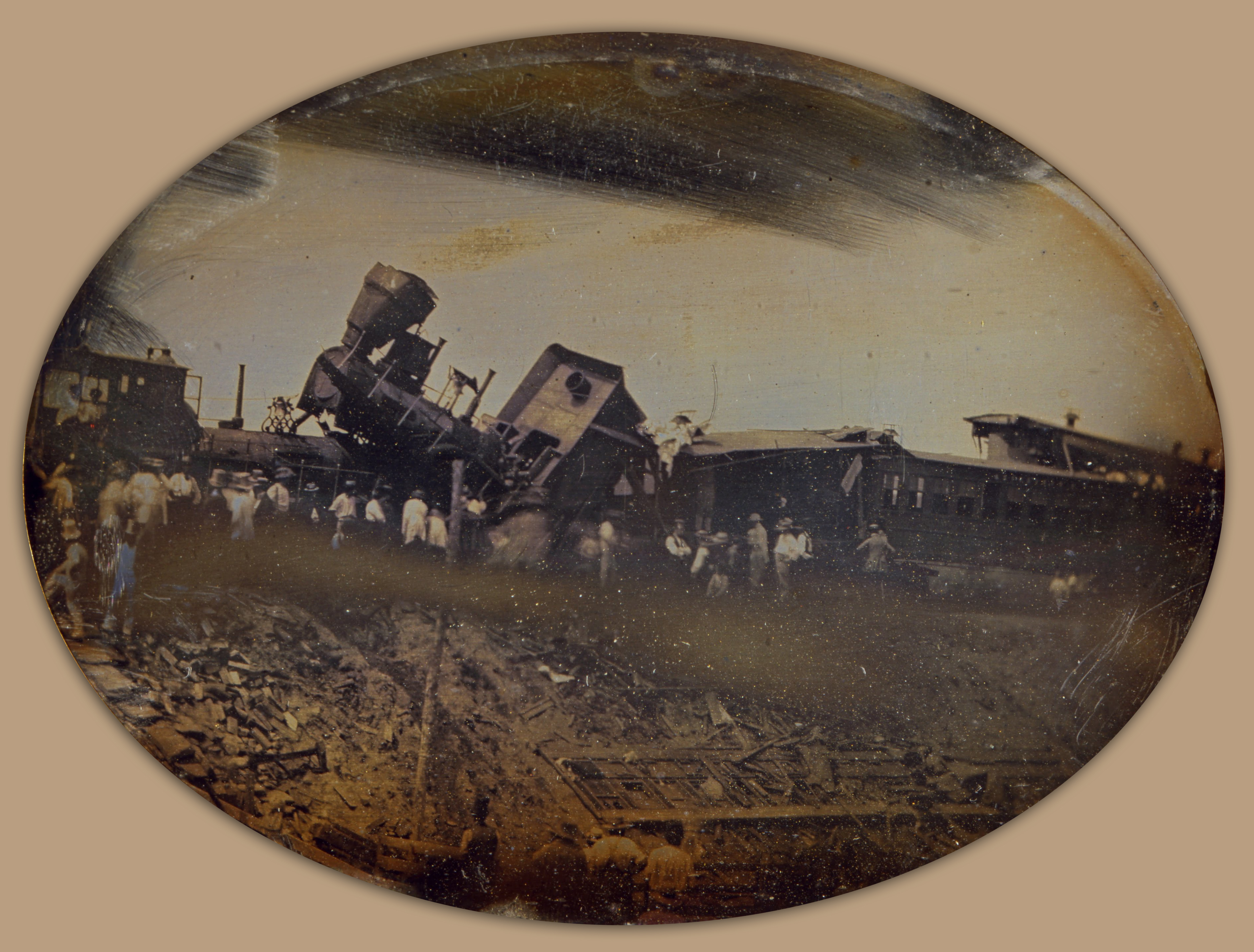
A photo of the 1853 collision in Valley Falls, Rhode Island

That same year, the worst accident in the company's history occurred in Valley Falls, Rhode Island. Two trains collided head-on, killing 14 people. The incident helped convince the P&W to double-track its mainline. The work began shortly after the accident but proceeded slowly; the final section of single track was upgraded in 1885, 32 years later.

The P&W benefited from a general increase in economic activity and shipping during the American Civil War, though little of its freight was directly related to the war effort. The company paid off its debts and invested $20,000 ($412,000 in 2025) on track improvements in 1864 alone.

=== Expansion and improvements ===
The Providence and Worcester leased two other railroads: the Milford and Woonsocket Railroad in 1868, and the Hopkinton Railroad, a northward extension of the Milford and Woonsocket, in 1872. Neither company directly connected to any P&W line; the leases were motivated by a desire to prevent either company from competing with the P&W for traffic. Both leases expired in 1883, with the two railroads resuming independent operation that year; the Milford and Woonsocket took over the Hopkinton the following year.

Following an 1872 agreement with the New Jersey Central Railroad and a coal company to build a coal dock near Providence, the company began construction in 1874 on the seven-mile (11 km) long East Providence Branch between Valley Falls and East Providence. The branch opened the same year, and provided an alternate routing for coal imports that avoided the use of horses through downtown Providence. The East Providence Branch briefly saw passenger service between 1893 and 1896; it was otherwise exclusively used for freight trains. The completion of the branch increased the importance of Valley Falls to the P&W, and in 1878 the company completed a new engine house there. This was followed in the next few years by a variety of repair and maintenance shops, which were all relocated from sites in Providence. An early form of railroad signaling was completed on the joint P&W-B&P line through Providence and Pawtucket in 1882, and upon proving successful it was expanded to the entire P&W main line by 1884, making the P&W the very first American railroad to fully signalize its main line with electric signals.

== End of independence ==
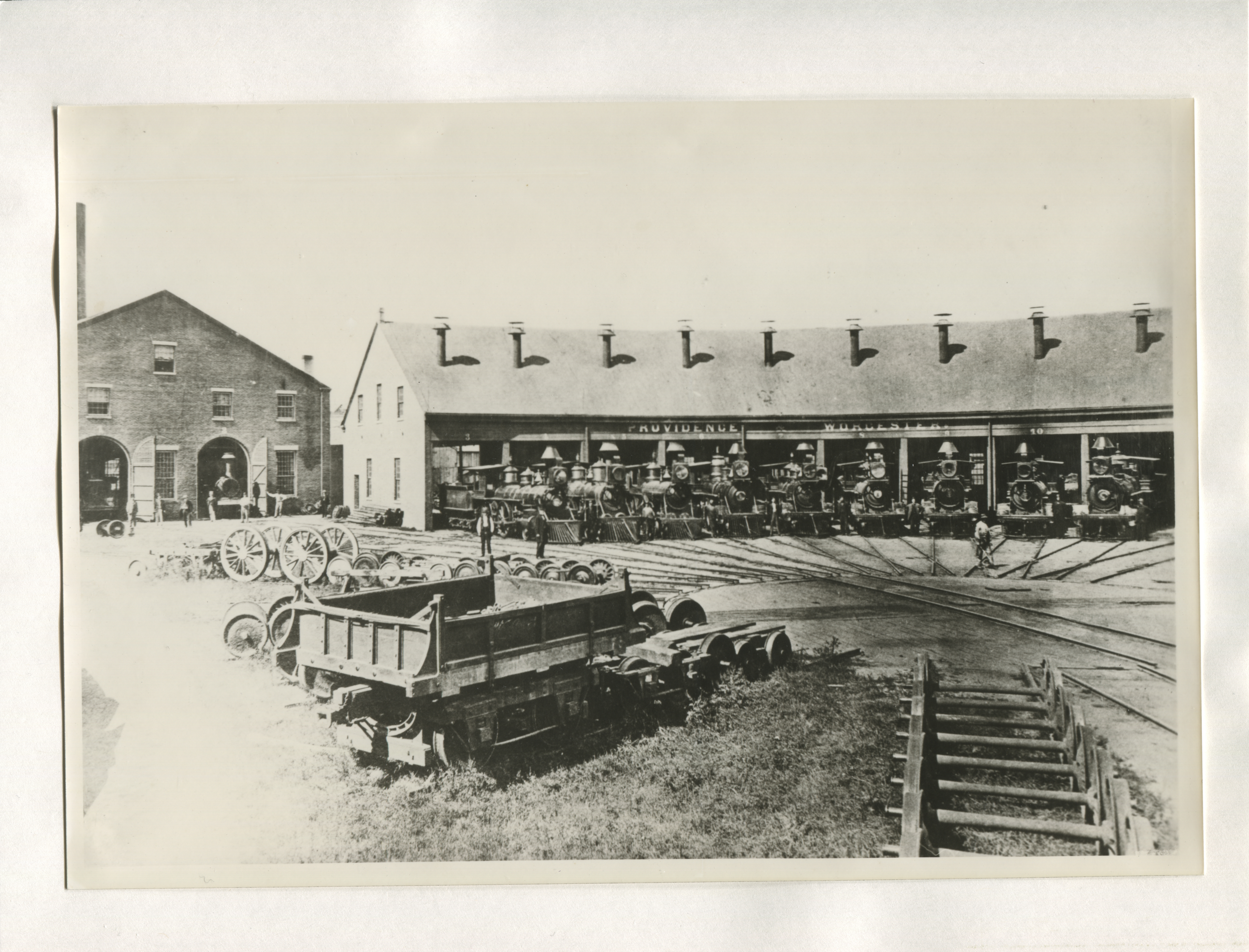
The P&W roundhouse in Providence, circa 1870

From the 1870s onward, several railroad companies in New England began a wave of consolidation, leasing or merging other lines to form large networks. The P&W ignored this trend, although it had opportunities to combine with several of its connections at Worcester. The first of the larger companies to approach the P&W was the Stonington Line (formally the New York, Providence and Boston Railroad), the Providence and Worcester's southern connection in Providence. In February 1888, the Stonington Line announced plans to lease the Providence and Worcester Railroad, effective May 1, 1888, subject to approval by shareholders of both companies. The Stonington Line agreed to pay $310,000 ($11.1 million in 2025) per year, plus up to $50,000 a year in stock-related payments, in exchange for the lease. As part of the lease, the Stonington also agreed to maintain all P&W trackage and equipment to high standards. A member of the special committee appointed by the P&W board of directors, at the vote to ratify the lease, noted that "there were 372 women stockholders, representing 8,975 shares, equivalent at par to $897,500 – a peculiar holding which was not found in any other corporation in the country." Both railroads' stockholders and boards of directors approved the lease, with P&W shareholders unanimously in favor, and in May 1888, the Providence and Worcester ceased to be an independent railroad. As part of the Stonington Line, operations were changed little, apart from integration with the P&W's new lessee as the "Worcester Division".

Control by the Stonington Line lasted only a few years, as wealthy financer J. P. Morgan had aspirations to build a railroad empire, and both the Stonington Line and the Old Colony Railroad were in his sights. Acting through J.P. Morgan & Co., he bought controlling stock of each company and had them leased by the New York, New Haven and Hartford Railroad (commonly known as the New Haven), which he held an interest in. As part of these transactions, the P&W lease was transferred from the Stonington Line to the New Haven under the same terms as originally written. The New Haven operated the P&W for the next 77 years.

=== Under the New Haven ===
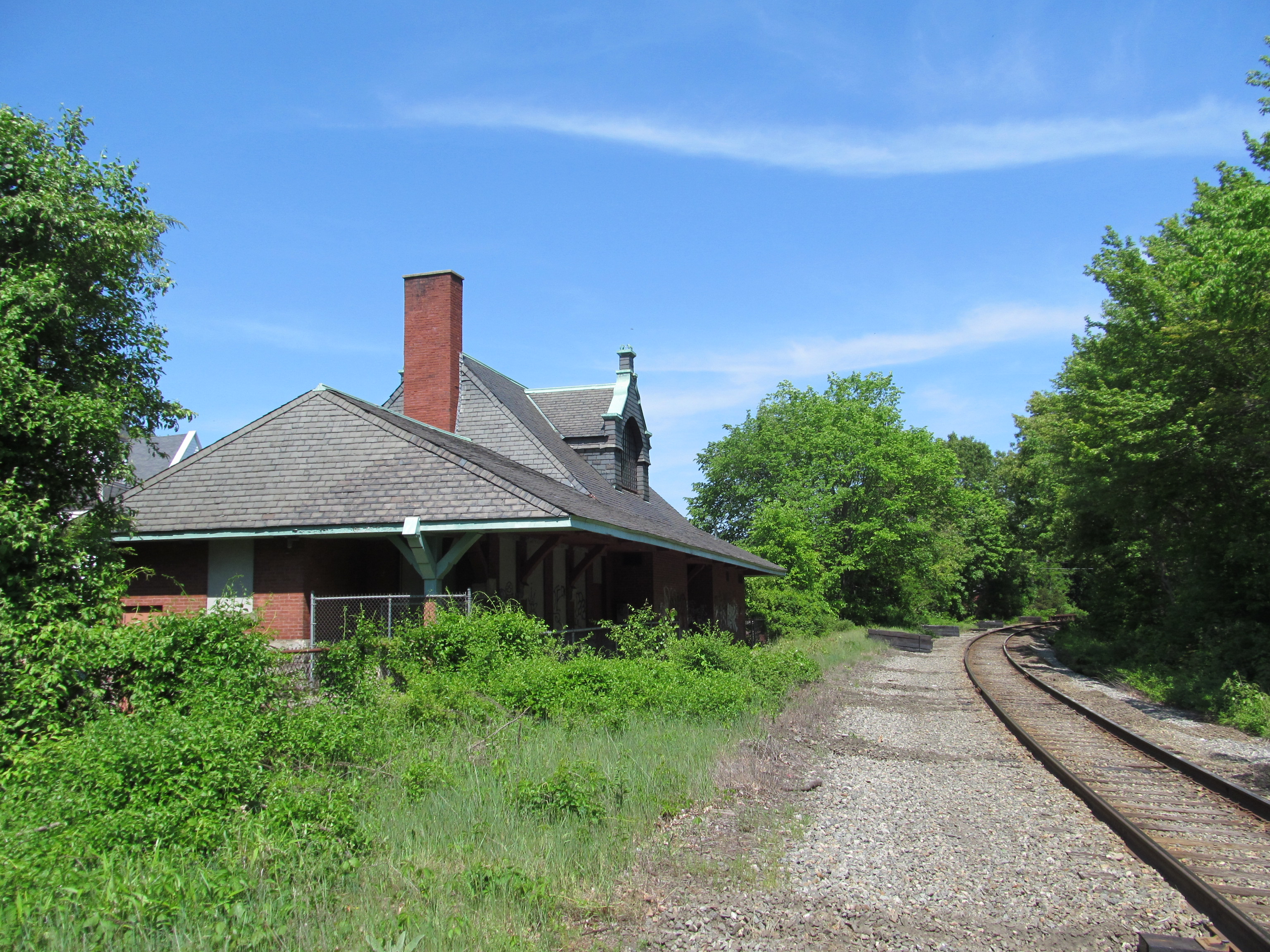
Uxbridge station is a preserved P&W train station.

Despite the company's lease, the New Haven owned only a very small number of shares – 91 out of 35,000 – by 1905, finding that P&W shareholders were very reluctant to part with their shares. That year, the New Haven attempted to get a bill passed in the Rhode Island General Assembly that would allow it to condemn the shares of minority shareholders who owned stock in the companies it leased, as long as the New Haven held a simple majority of all shares. Due to significant opposition, most fiercely by the Providence and Worcester Railroad, this attempt was defeated; the bill was amended to require the owning railroad to hold at least 75 percent of a company's shares before condemnation of minority shareholders' shares was possible. This meant that the New Haven could not purchase the P&W unless it was willing to buy 75 percent of the company's shares, securing the P&W's continued existence as a company. These same rules protecting minority shareholders would pave the way for the Providence and Worcester to regain its independence in the future.

The New Haven's monopolistic tendencies attracted attention from regulators, and many of its acquisitions were obtained well above market value. These factors combined to cause economic problems for the company, and as a result the P&W facilities in Valley Falls were largely closed from 1907 to the 1920s. Continued money problems and the Great Depression brought the New Haven into bankruptcy in 1935, but the P&W's lessee continued to make its lease payments on time. When the New Haven emerged from its long bankruptcy in 1947, the P&W remained a leased property, along with the Norwich and Worcester Railroad and Holyoke and Westfield Railroad; it did not join the fate of most New Haven lessors which were consolidated.

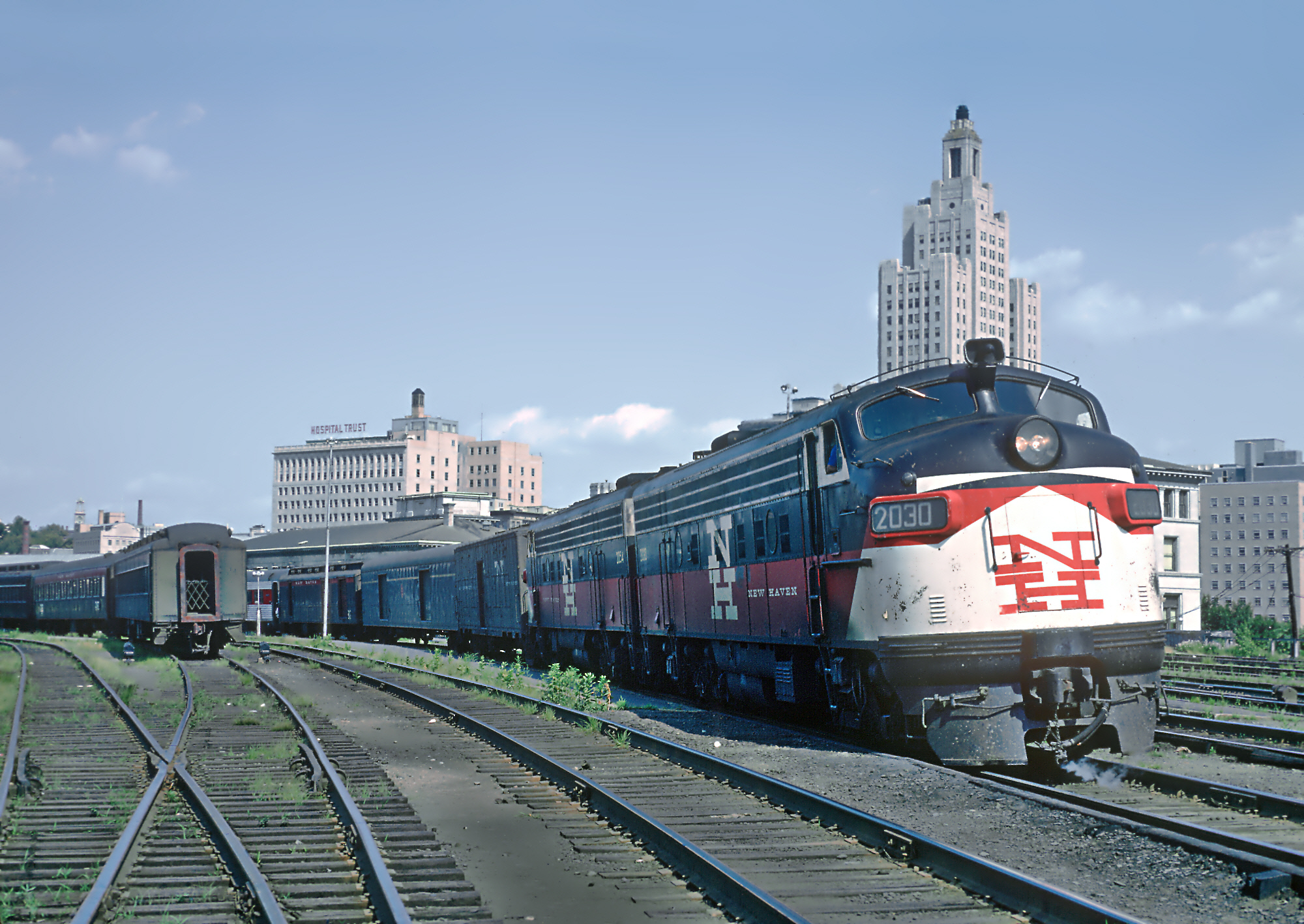
A New Haven Railroad passenger train in Providence in 1968, shortly before the Penn Central takeover

Both freight and passenger train traffic were initially strong under New Haven control. Fifteen passenger trains traveled the line each day in 1919, but by 1935 just one passenger train ran each way. The State of Maine Express, which connected New York City and Portland, Maine, began using the P&W route in 1946, adding a second train on the line each way daily. The New Haven began removing the double track on the P&W mainline in the 1950s, and it was reduced to a single track with passing sidings by 1963. Passenger train service on the line was cut back during the 1950s as well; after experimenting with four local trains each way in 1953, the New Haven cut the schedule back to one local round trip per day in 1954; this round trip was also discontinued by 1957. The State of Maine Express ended operations in 1960, leaving no passenger trains on the line.

Freight traffic also declined from the 1950s onward, as the Blackstone Valley's mills largely closed down and relocated to the Southern United States and trucking eroded railroad market share. In response to the declines in both passenger and freight traffic, the P&W's electric signal system was dismantled and the second track largely removed to lower maintenance costs. On July 7, 1961, the New Haven declared bankruptcy for a second and final time.

=== Plans for regained independence ===
Eder suggested P&W might resume independent operation. Remember that this was at a time when large rail mergers were occurring with regularity. Spinoffs were uncommon, and the idea of a resurrected P&W seemed quite ridiculous.

—

While the New Haven was bankrupt again, it continued its lease payments just as it had done during the previous bankruptcy. This time, however, the New Haven's condition was much worse and the possibility of survival was remote; its operations and physical plant had both become seriously neglected. Starting in 1964, a group of Providence and Worcester shareholders began plotting to acquire the company. They recruited Robert H. Eder, a businessman from Providence, to lead their efforts. The group launched three proxy fights to take control; the last one ended in 1966 with Eder as the Providence and Worcester's new president. Under his presidency, the P&W released its first ever audited annual report, had all P&W property appraised, and also commissioned a third party firm to write a report evaluating whether the P&W could successfully resume operations as an independent railroad, if necessary. While attempting to restore the P&W as an independent company was an option, the P&W's leadership was primarily seeking inclusion of the company within another railroad by a new lease or merger. The possibility of an independent P&W was meant as leverage to help secure this goal.

As part of negotiations to include the New Haven into the planned Penn Central Transportation Company merger, to be created by the New York Central and Pennsylvania Railroads, the New Haven's bankruptcy trustees were told to disaffirm the P&W lease in January 1967, and this was completed on May 1 of that year. The P&W objected to the Interstate Commerce Commission (ICC), which intervened in the company's favor and ordered the New Haven to continue operating the P&W as before, despite the disaffirmation. The Penn Central did not want the P&W, and in October 1968 specifically asked the ICC for it to be excluded from the merger, calling the lease situation "unfair and unreasonable". Despite its objections, and threatening to the ICC that it would abandon the Providence and Worcester's tracks if it were forced to include it in the merger, Penn Central was ordered to assume operation of the P&W when the New Haven was finally merged into PC at the end of 1968.

== The new Providence and Worcester Railroad ==
=== Separation from Penn Central ===
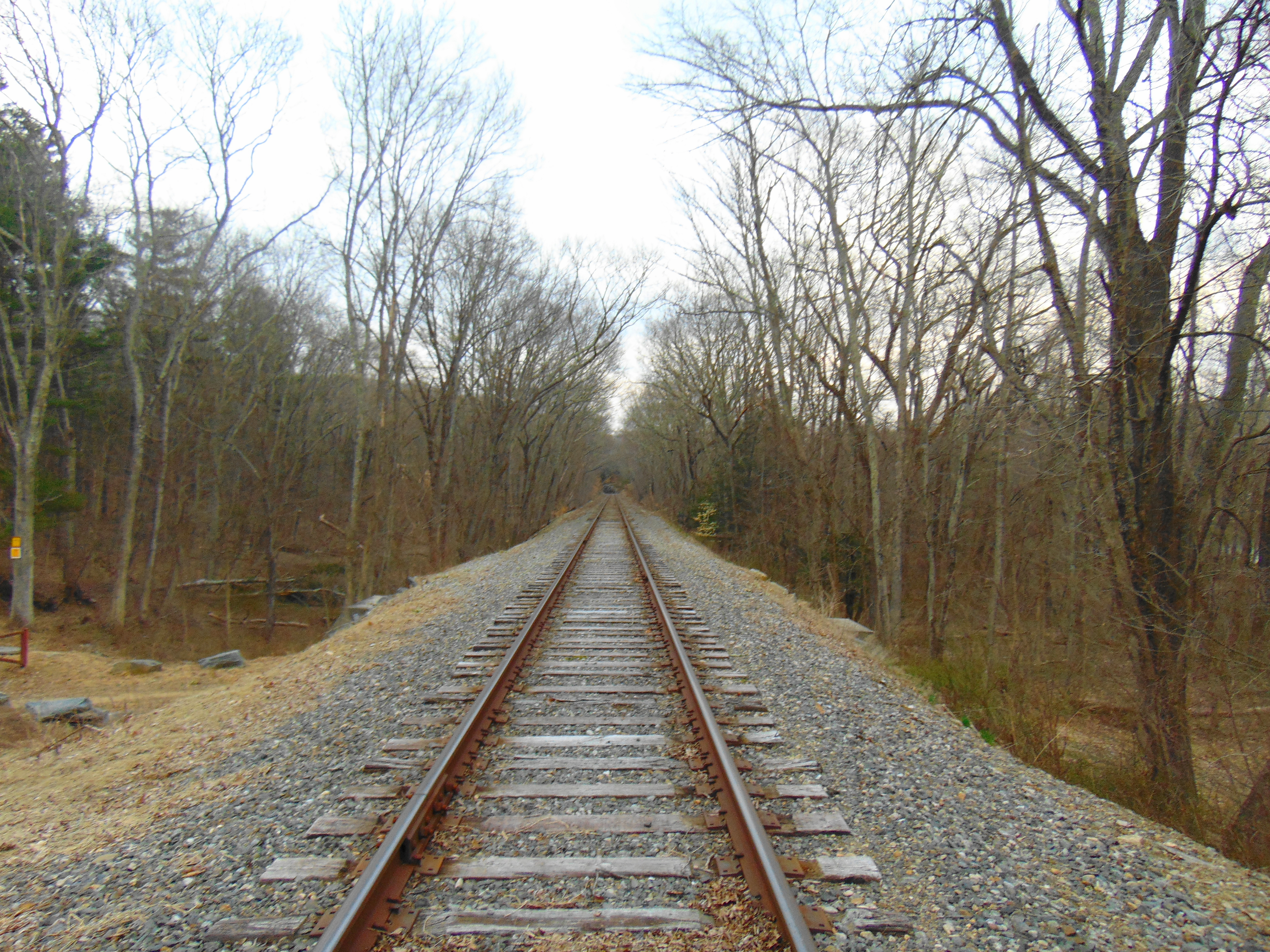
Providence and Worcester Railroad line within Salt Rock State Campground in Sprague, Connecticut

The New Haven had purchased a number of the P&W's shares in the three-quarters of a century it had held the lease, holding 28 percent of the company's total shares by the time Penn Central took over. While the New Haven had long tolerated the peculiar rules that kept the P&W alive as a company, the railroad's new lessor was not willing to tolerate them any longer and demanded the voting rules and clauses that heavily restricted its control be rewritten. The same rules that left the New Haven unable to take over the P&W also frustrated the Penn Central, which found itself with only three percent voting power, despite both leasing the company and inheriting the New Haven's portion of the company's shares.

As part of its order requiring Penn Central to take over the P&W under the terms of the lease, the ICC also required the P&W to change its voting clauses by June 30, 1969, or else Penn Central would be allowed to take direct control and be able to proceed with abandonment. Eder and the rest of the P&W leadership had considered seeking merger into another railroad, such as the Boston and Maine Railroad (B&M) or the Norfolk and Western Railway (though the latter company did not connect to the Providence and Worcester, at that time it was considering a purchase of the Delaware and Hudson Railway). Now, however, time was short and the previously half-hearted idea of returning the P&W to independence was the best path to saving the company.

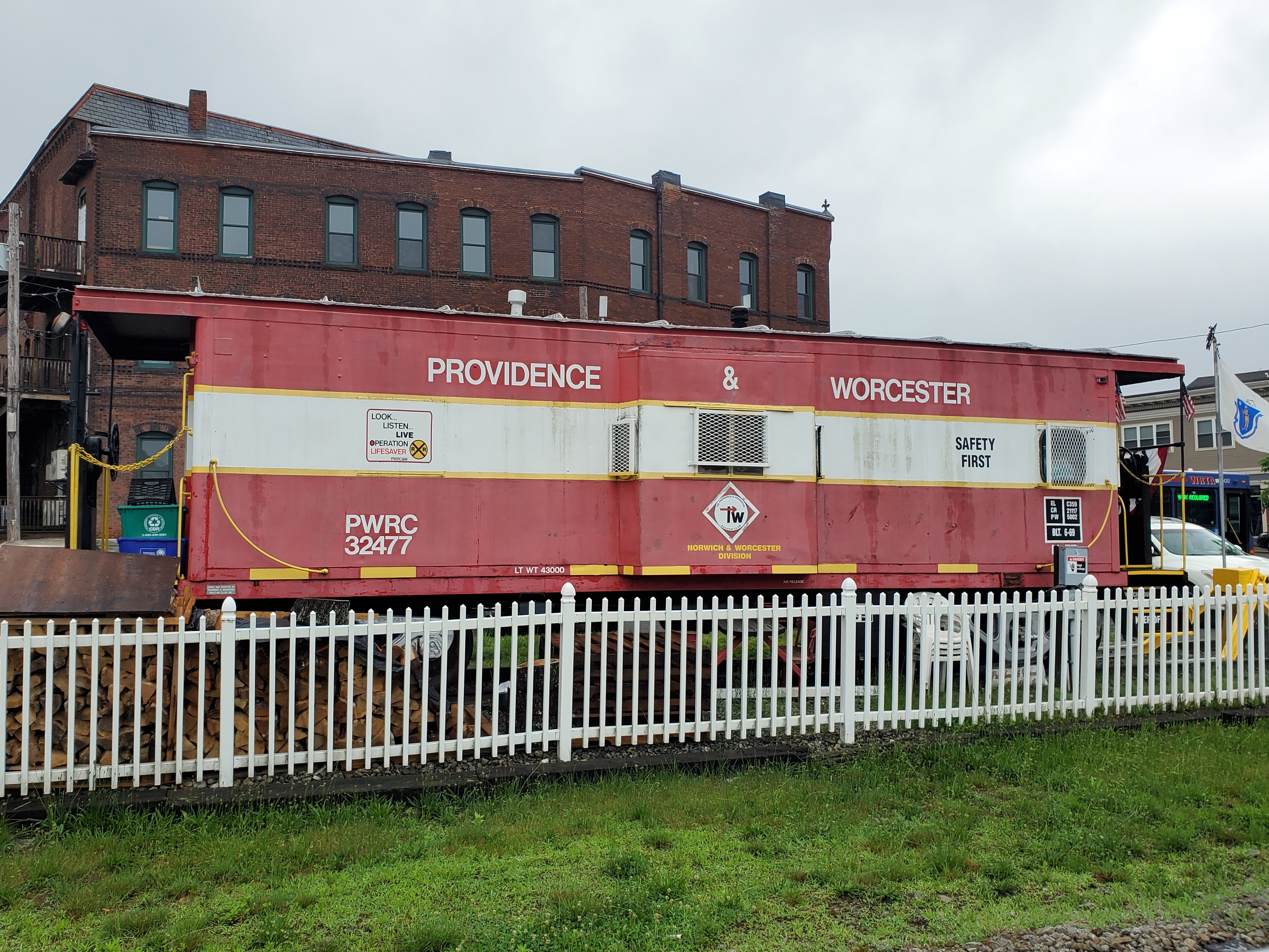
A retired P&W caboose preserved at the P&W Railfan Club Museum

Ignoring Penn Central's objections, in 1969 the P&W incorporated a new version of the company in Delaware and merged the existing company into the new one, while maintaining the voting rules from the company's original 1844 charter; this was done for "the simplification of the corporate structure" of the company. Then, on April 6, 1970, the P&W formally asked the ICC to allow their company to exit the New Haven merger and become independent; the previously commissioned report was updated and found profitable operations feasible. While it did not want the P&W, Penn Central was unwilling to allow this to happen either, as it wanted both to continue serving large customers in East Providence and Worcester and access to the P&W's real estate holdings in Providence, leading to a series of court battles. Penn Central itself went bankrupt in June 1970 and ended its lease payments.

In response to P&W's appeal, the ICC took up the matter in January 1971. P&W could point to the support of potential P&W customers along with politicians and railroad regulatory agencies in Massachusetts and Rhode Island, and the hearings concluded on June 11, 1971, with the presiding ICC examiner approving P&W's request for independence. P&W also worked out an agreement with the relevant railroad worker unions, guaranteeing a high salary, a profit-sharing agreement, and representation on the P&W's board. In exchange, P&W would implement a maximum crew size of three people and abolish the distinctions between engineer, conductor, and other train crew roles, allowing any employee to fill any position as needed. While the ICC and unions had given the P&W's independence their blessing, Penn Central was unmoved and exhausted its appeals until December 20, 1972, when a federal judge assigned to Penn Central's own bankruptcy court ordered the company to allow the Providence and Worcester to end its lease and assume control of its lines. On February 3, 1973, the Providence and Worcester Railroad became an independent railroad again after 85 years.

=== Expansion ===
The newly independent P&W began with 45 miles (72 km) of track between its two namesake cities in addition to the East Providence Branch and two isolated Penn Central lines (3 miles (4.8 km) from Slatersville to Woonsocket and a 1-mile (1.6 km) segment of the former Valley Falls Branch) which were transferred as well. For motive power, P&W initially operated a small fleet of five ALCO RS-3 locomotives, plus five cabooses, all leased from fellow Northeastern United States railroad Delaware and Hudson Railway. The Providence and Worcester found its first opportunity for expansion in a recently abandoned line cast off by the Boston and Maine Railroad (B&M). In 1974, P&W purchased this 23-mile (37 km) long branch between Worcester and Gardner, Massachusetts, from B&M, connecting it with the latter company's main line. Penn Central had not forgotten how the P&W had escaped from its control, and created delays in car interchange between itself and the P&W, until the latter company once again appealed to the ICC for assistance. The new connection with the B&M in Gardner allowed P&W access to a more friendly interchange partner. Almost immediately, the independent P&W was recognized for providing exemplary service to its customers, in direct contrast with Penn Central; in 1974 the Rhode Island Department of Transportation recommended giving sole responsibility for all freight rail in Providence to P&W.

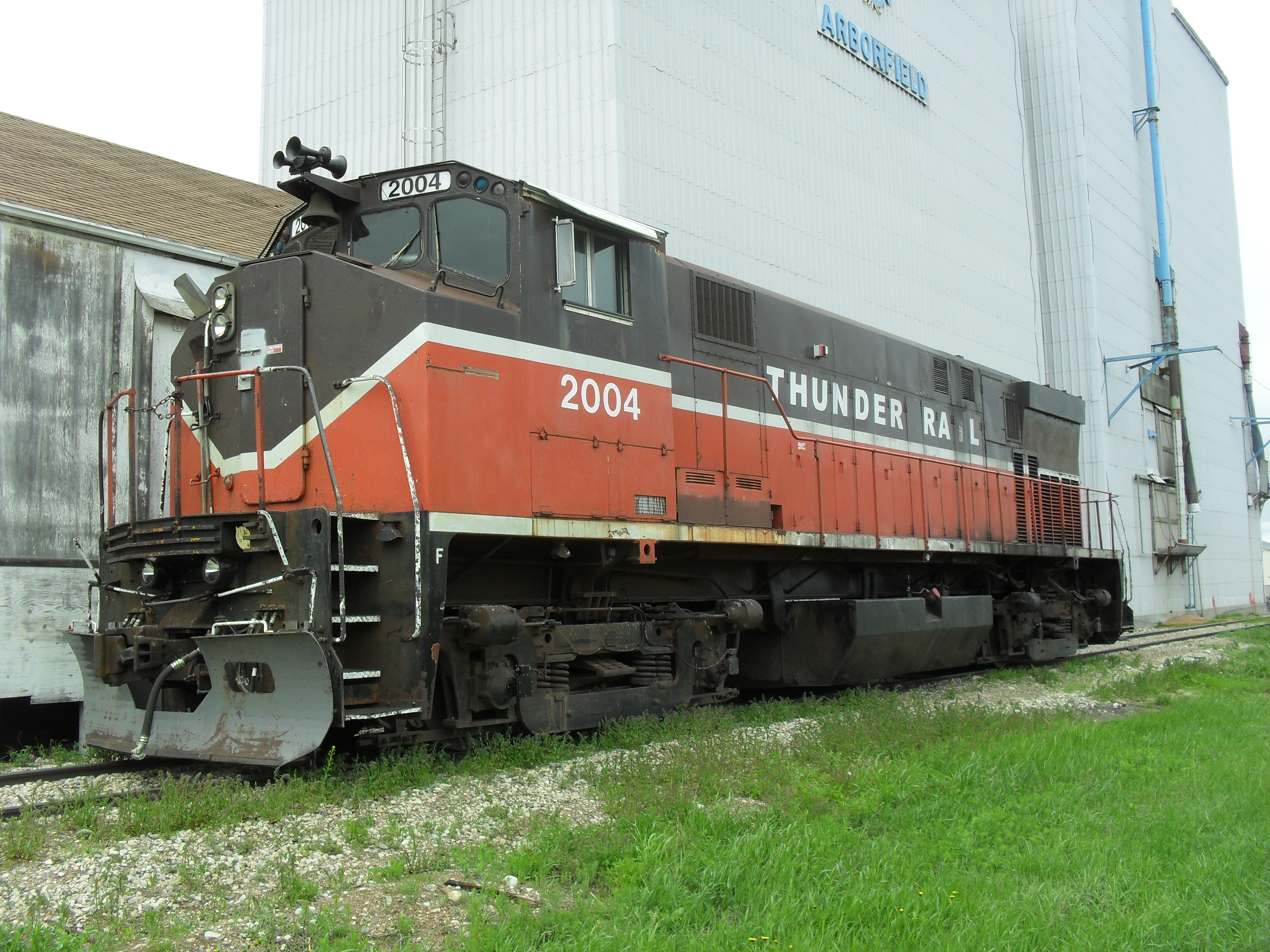
This M-420R operated on P&W until 1994, when it was sold. It still wore P&W colors in this 2010 photograph.

Needing a more permanent solution than its leased ALCOs, P&W first reached out to dominant American locomotive manufacturers GE Transportation and General Motors' Electro Motive Division, but both refused to give the newly independent company quotes for new locomotives. Shunned by American manufacturers, P&W turned to Montreal Locomotive Works (MLW), the Canadian affiliate of ALCO which survived ALCO's dissolution in 1969. MLW saw an opportunity to sell its first locomotives in America, and accepted P&W's order for five new MLW M-420R locomotives, tagging on to an order for 80 M-420s by Canadian National Railway. These new locomotives became the backbone of the Providence and Worcester fleet, and the older RS‑3s were given back to the Delaware and Hudson.

The federal government created the United States Railway Association (USRA) in 1974 to manage the formation of Conrail, which was to take over a number of bankrupt railroads in the Northeast, including Penn Central. Penn Central owned a 71-mile (114 km) line that connected Worcester to Groton, Connecticut, via Plainfield, Connecticut. The USRA decided to include only the portion between Groton and Plainfield in Conrail, with the remaining portion reverting to its original owner: the Norwich and Worcester Railroad (N&W). The N&W had been leased by a variety of railroads since 1869, but was now independent again, and proposed to resume operating its portion of the line. Seeing an opportunity for expansion, the Providence and Worcester made a bid for the line from Plainfield to Worcester as well, winning the support of Connecticut business groups, unions, and Chris Dodd, at the time a U.S. Representative. The latter stated in January 1974 that it was "extremely questionable whether the Norwich and Worcester has demonstrated the ability to provide even minimal service to eastern Connecticut". The USRA found the arguments of the Providence and Worcester and its supporters that it was in a better position to take over the line on account of its years of profitable operations persuasive, and transferred it to the railroad later that year.

The remaining 27 miles (43 km) of the N&W went to Conrail, but the Providence and Worcester was not satisfied with its share of the line and sought to acquire the rest of the line from the newly formed railroad. Conrail initially was unprofitable, and in 1976 the Providence and Worcester approached the company with an offer to buy its 27-mile line between Plainfield and Groton. Conrail was unwilling to give up the line, which was one of its most profitable in the state, leading the Connecticut Department of Transportation to request that the federal government order the line transferred that year. The following year, Conrail was forced to sell the line, due to the law that established the company requiring it to sell lines to any private companies offering a fair price. Despite this, Conrail continued to operate the line while debate continued between the two railroads over what constituted a "fair price" – Conrail wanted over $3 million, while the Providence and Worcester offered under $1 million. Finally, on May 20, 1980, a federal court announced it was ordering Conrail to sell the line to the P&W for $1.75 million, which the three justices on the court decided was a fair price.

=== 1980s ===
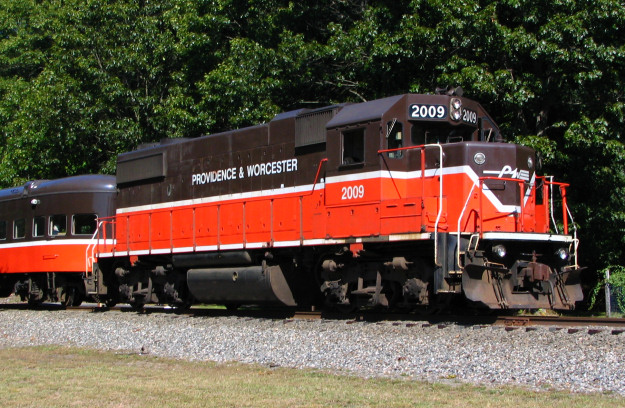
Providence and Worcester GP38-2 2009 hauling a passenger excursion train

As P&W expanded its network, the company spent heavily to improve the condition of lines it purchased, many of which had been poorly maintained by previous owners. The repairs were partially funded by the federal government and by the states served by P&W.

In 1982, the Providence and Worcester acquired all of Conrail's lines in Rhode Island, along with some in Connecticut. While P&W wanted all 530 miles (850 km) of Conrail's lines in Southern New England, it had to compete with the Boston & Maine, at the time in the sights of newly formed Guilford Transportation Industries, which bought portions of Conrail's network in Connecticut. The Providence and Worcester objected to allowing Guilford to form a major railroad network in New England, to no avail. The P&W also purchased two shortline railroads in Rhode Island between 1981 and 1982: the Moshassuck Valley Railroad and the Warwick Railway.

In December 1987, P&W owner Capital Properties Inc. of Providence, announced it was divesting the railroad, with Capital's shareholders each getting 2 shares of the railroad's stock per share of Capital stock.

=== 1990s ===
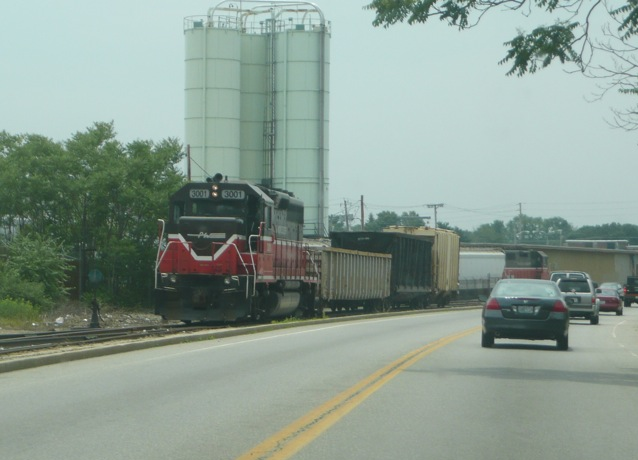
A Providence and Worcester freight train on the East Providence branch in 2008

The Providence and Worcester further expanded into Connecticut in 1993, when it purchased Conrail's line between Cedar Hill Yard in North Haven and Middletown. Between November 1993 and June 1994, the railroad improved the line in cooperation with the Connecticut Department of Transportation, replacing more than 5,000 ties and 7,000 feet (2,100 m) of rail in a $650,000 project. After the project was complete, its speed limit increased from 10 to 25 miles per hour. The increased speed and frequency of trains concerned some residents along the line, who advocated for the installation of gates and lights at railroad crossings for safety. P&W bought the Middletown-based shortline Connecticut Central Railroad in 1998, adding a cluster of branch lines in that city to its network.

In the mid-1990s, P&W traffic decreased when a number of its major customers closed or moved. In response, the company expanded interchange traffic with other railroads. The company reached an agreement in 1996 for trackage rights over the Northeast Corridor between New Haven and the New York and Atlantic Railway's Fresh Pond Junction yard in Queens, New York. The Providence and Worcester uses the tracks to haul stone between its connection with the Branford Steam Railroad and New York City.

=== 21st century ===
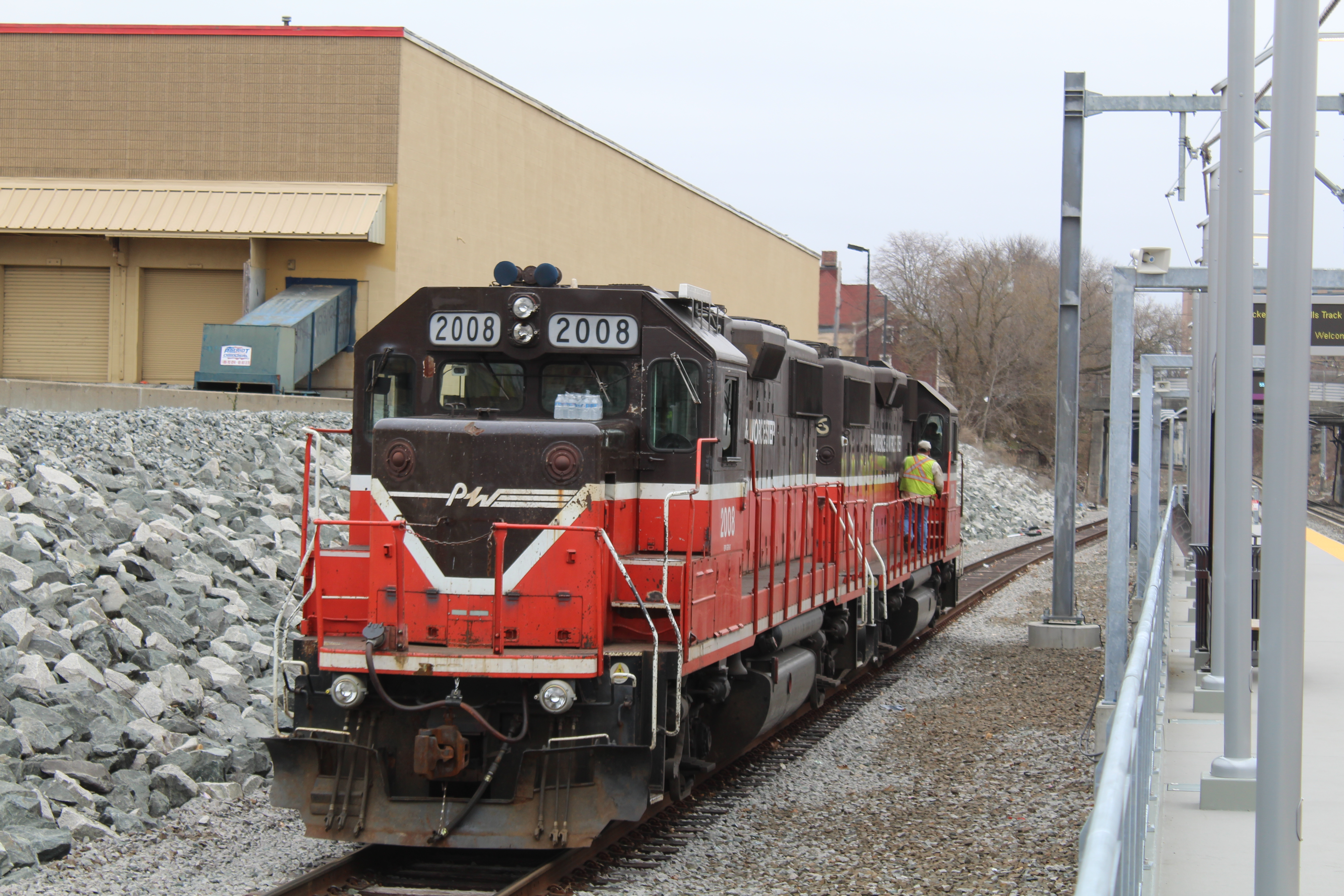
Two of P&W's EMD GP38-2s at Pawtucket/Central Falls station in 2023

The Boston Surface Railroad was formed in 2014 to restore passenger service on the P&W main line between Providence and Worcester, which was discontinued by the New Haven in 1960. Boston Surface intended to contract its train operations—commuter service with a stop in Woonsocket—to the Providence and Worcester. In 2019, the Rhode Island Department of Transportation reported that no substantial progress on launching train operations had been made. The railroad filed for bankruptcy later that year, though company officials said in 2021 that they intended to begin operations eventually.

P&W formed an agreement with the New England Central Railroad in 2012 to move Canadian National Railway trains between Canada and southern New England. A similar agreement was signed in 2014 to move Canadian Pacific Railway freight, with Vermont Rail System joining along with NECR. This was made possible by the reopening of a mothballed P&W line between Willimantic and Versailles, Connecticut in 2007, which had been out of service for several decades. P&W trains connect with New England Central at Willimantic via this line.

Shortline holding company Genesee & Wyoming announced in August 2016 that it intended to buy the Providence and Worcester Railroad for $25.00 per share, or approximately $126 million. The acquisition was completed on November 1, 2016, with P&W's shares placed in a trust pending Surface Transportation Board approval. The STB approved the acquisition on December 16, 2016, subject to a condition that G&W not interfere with the ability of Pan Am Railways (via its operating subsidiary Springfield Terminal) to connect with CSX in Worcester. G&W stated that it "does not contemplate any material changes to P&W's operations, maintenance, or service" following the purchase. P&W sold its former headquarters at 75 Hammond Street in Worcester in October 2022, relocating to 381 Southbridge Street, also in Worcester.

In 2019, the Providence and Worcester reopened 8 miles (13 km) of track between Hartford and Rocky Hill, known as the Wethersfield Secondary, which had been out of service since 2008. The reopened line provided a more direct route for freight to reach Middletown.

== Operations ==
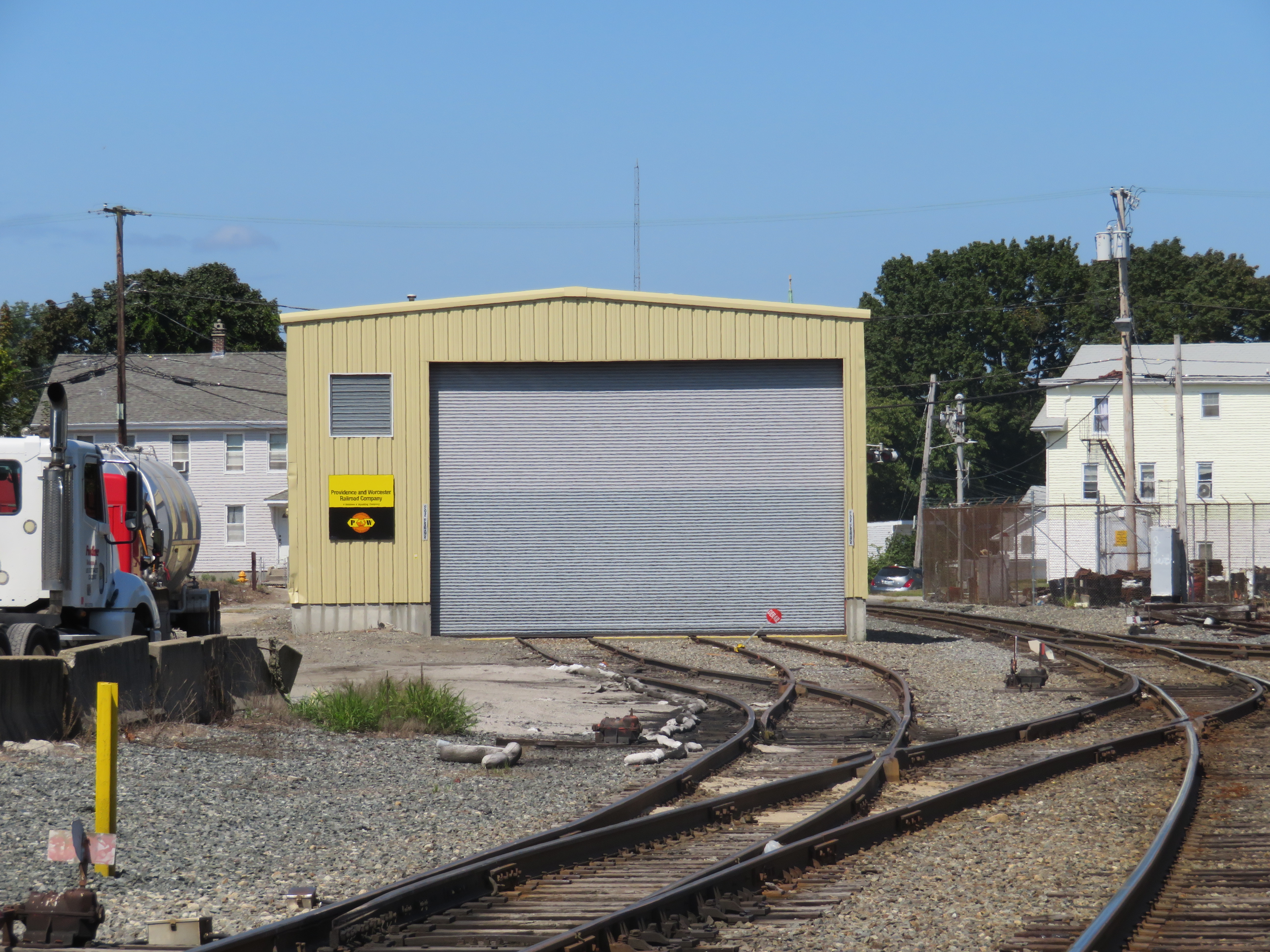
The Providence and Worcester Railroad engine house in Valley Falls, Rhode Island

The Providence and Worcester Railroad is headquartered in Worcester, an important interchange point with CSX Transportation. Other interchange points include:

- Pan Am Southern in Gardner, Massachusetts
- New England Central Railroad in Willimantic, Connecticut
- New York and Atlantic Railway in Queens
- CSX in New Haven
- Housatonic Railroad in Danbury, Connecticut
- Connecticut Southern Railroad in Hartford, Connecticut

Through haulage agreements, the railroad also connects with Canadian National Railway, Canadian Pacific Railway, and Norfolk Southern Railway. As of 2016, P&W served 140 distinct customers on its lines, and had a workforce of 138 employees.

=== Facilities ===
P&W's primary maintenance facility for locomotives and railcars is located in Worcester near the company's headquarters building. A secondary facility in Plainfield, Connecticut, is responsible for maintenance of trucks and also houses the company's paint shop for repainting locomotives.

=== Train operations ===
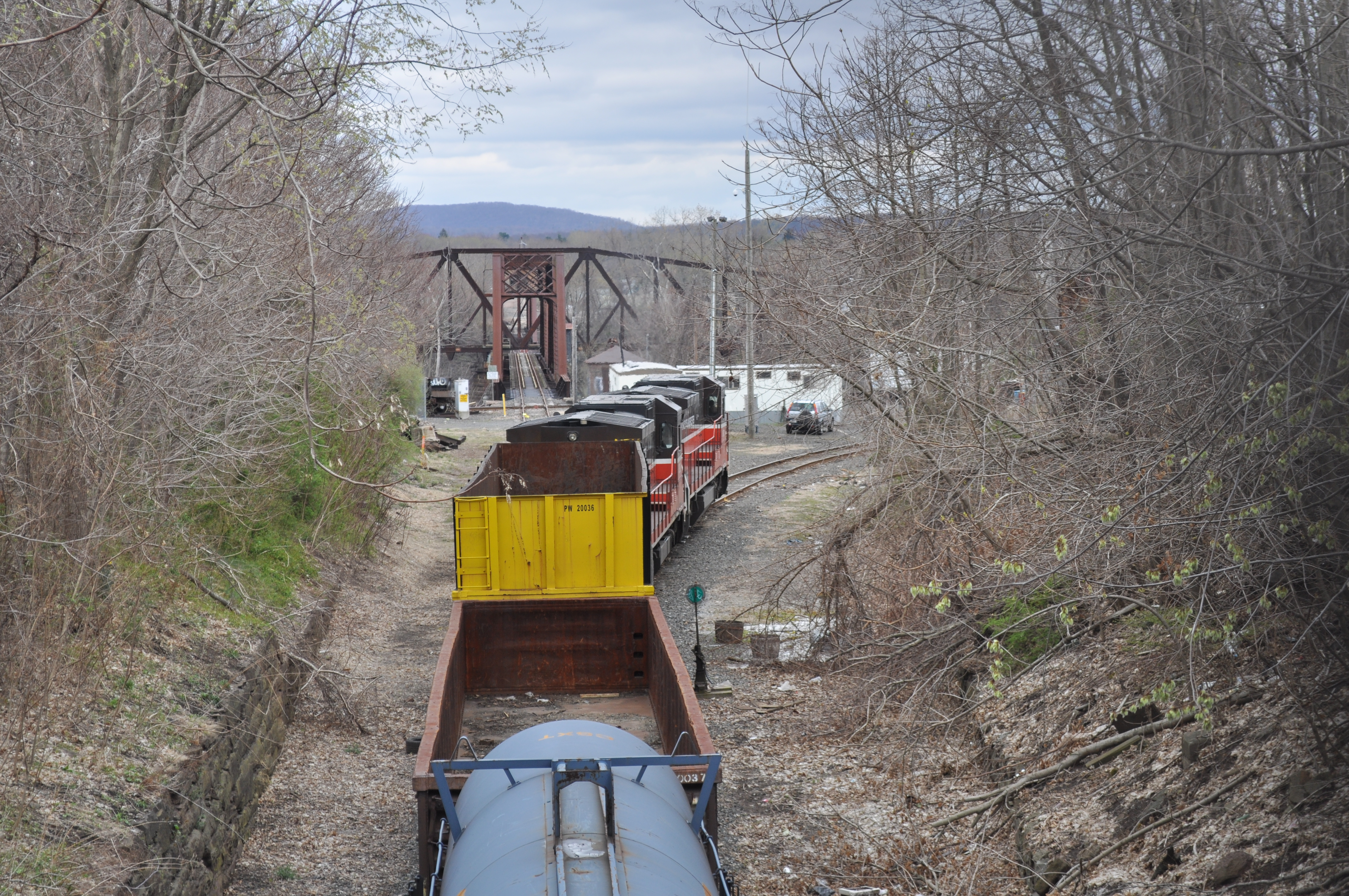
A Providence and Worcester train in Middletown, Connecticut near the Middletown–Portland railroad bridge

As of 2016, Providence and Worcester freight trains are based out of the following locations:

- Worcester: Trains based out of Worcester operate between Gardner, Massachusetts, where P&W connects to Pan Am Southern, and both Plainfield and Davisville, with freight exchanged with the Seaview Transportation Company at the latter location. Local trains based out of Worcester serve facilities in the city, including a significant intermodal yard.
- Plainfield: From Plainfield, P&W operates trains southward to Willimantic, site of a connection with the New England Central Railroad. Another regularly operated train operates between Plainfield and Cedar Hill Yard in North Haven, Connecticut, via Groton, Connecticut.
- Valley Falls: A pair of local freight trains are based in Valley Falls. These serve customers in Rhode Island, particularly the Port of Providence.
- North Haven: P&W leases track space at Cedar Hill Yard from its owners, CSX and Amtrak. Local freight trains based at Cedar Hill operate to Middletown, Connecticut, and the Port of New Haven. Other local freights based here provide freight service for rail-based shippers on Metro-North Railroad's Danbury Branch, and the Waterbury Branch from Derby southward. Cedar Hill is also the base of operations for unit trains of construction aggregate. These trains originate at quarries in Plainfield and Wallingford, Connecticut, as well as an interchange with the Branford Steam Railroad in Branford, Connecticut. Some trains are destined for Tilcon Connecticut facilities in Danbury, Old Saybrook, and Groton, Connecticut, while the remainder travel to Fresh Pond Junction where trains are handed off to the New York and Atlantic Railway for destinations on Long Island.

=== System ===
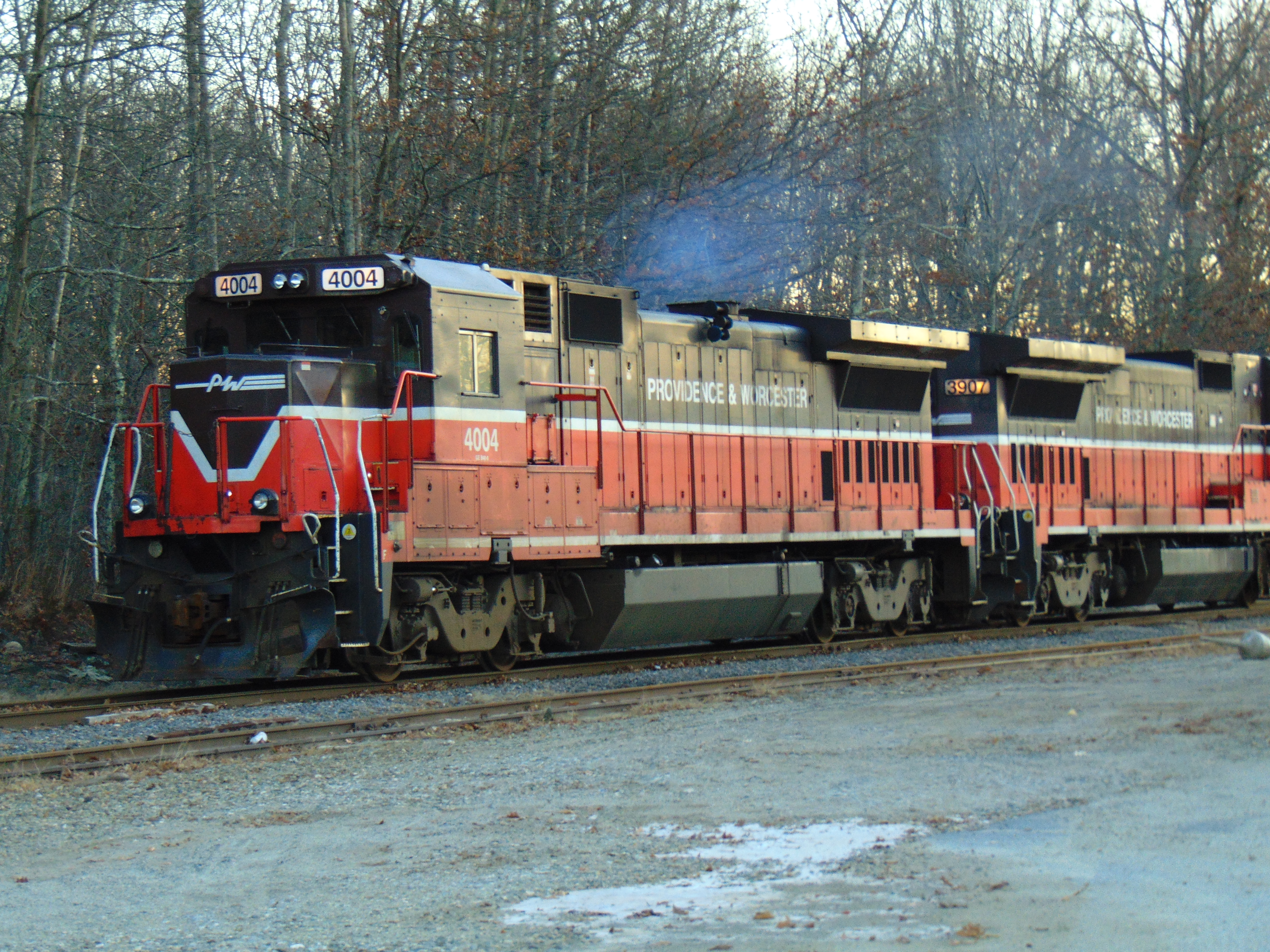
A P&W train in Plainfield, Connecticut

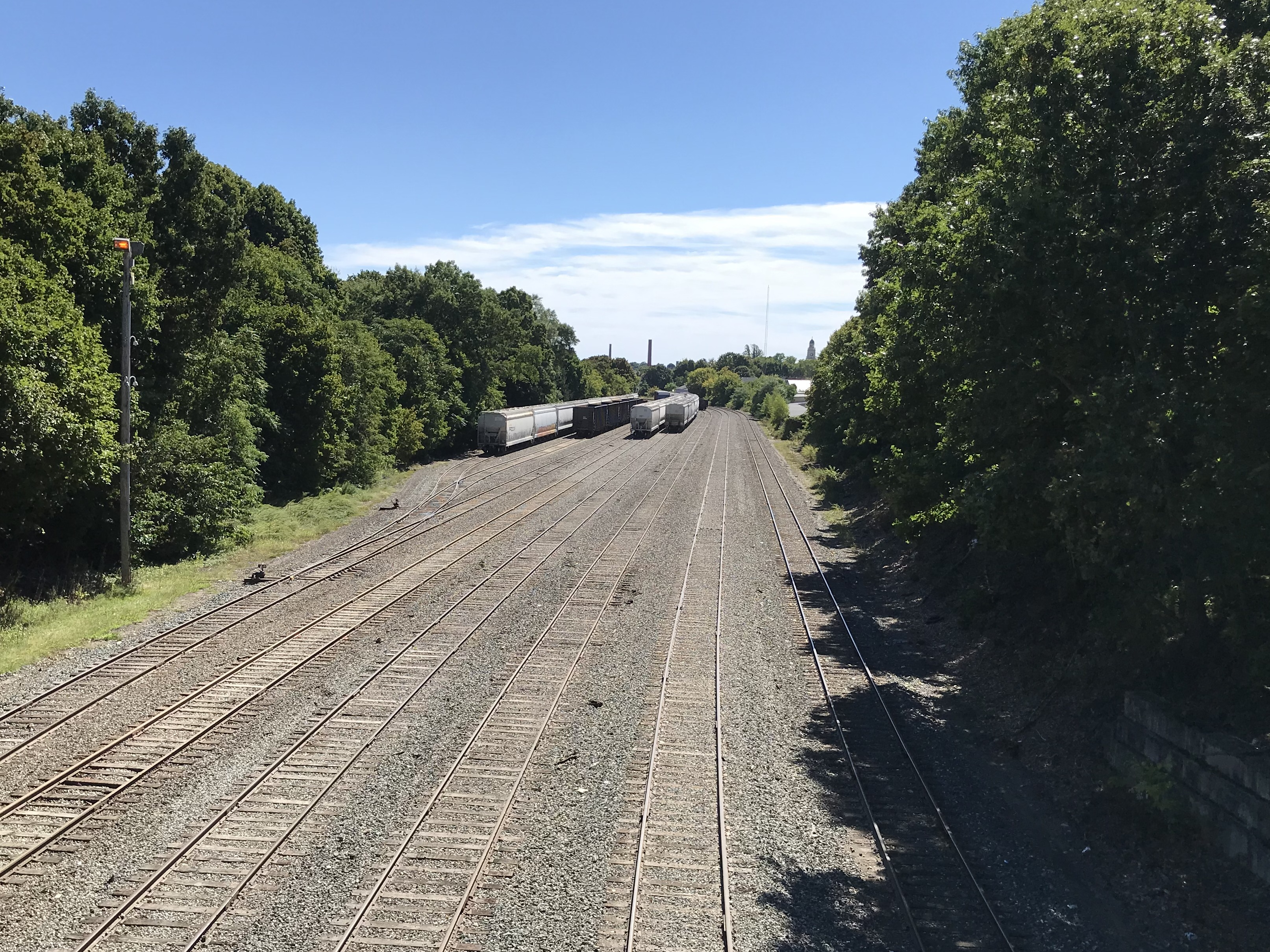
Valley Falls Yard is the primary P&W yard in Rhode Island.

The Providence and Worcester directly owns and operates:

- Its main line, connecting Providence and Worcester via Woonsocket.
  - The Slatersville branch, between Woonsocket and Slatersville.
- The East Providence Branch and East Junction Branch, two connected branch lines. The East Providence Branch originates at Valley Falls Yard where it meets the P&W main line and ends in East Providence, where it meets the East Junction Branch. The latter branch runs between East Providence and the end of P&W's operating rights in Seekonk, Massachusetts.
- The Moshassuck Industrial Track and the Warwick Industrial Track, which are remnants of the Moshassuck Valley Railroad in Pawtucket, Rhode Island, and the Warwick Railway in Cranston, Rhode Island, respectively.
- The Norwich and Worcester main line, between Worcester and Norwich.
  - A branch of this line between Plainfield and Versailles, Connecticut.
- A three-mile-long branch line in Groton, Connecticut, which connects to the Northeast Corridor.
- The Belle Dock line which serves the Port of New Haven.

P&W operates on but does not own the following:

- The Harbor Junction Industrial Track, a branch serving the Port of Providence, owned by the City of Providence.
- A branch between Versailles and Willimantic, Connecticut, owned by CTDOT.
- The former Connecticut Valley Railroad route between Middletown and Wethersfield, Connecticut, owned by the Connecticut Department of Transportation.
- The Middletown Secondary (former Boston and New York Air-Line Railroad) between North Haven and Durham, Connecticut, owned by Tilcon Connecticut.
- The Middletown Cluster, which includes several short branches in Middletown and the northern portion of the Middletown Secondary between Durham and Middletown, all owned by the State of Connecticut.
- P&W has rights on the line between Fall River, Massachusetts, and the former Sakonnet River rail bridge in Tiverton, Rhode Island, but does not use them, as the line, owned by the Rhode Island Department of Transportation, is out of service.

P&W has freight rights on several passenger lines, owned by Amtrak and Metro-North Railroad, meaning it can both serve freight customers and run through trains on them:

- Amtrak's Northeast Corridor between Providence and New Haven.
- Metro-North Railroad's Danbury Branch.
- Metro-North Railroad's Waterbury Branch, from Derby southward.

Finally, P&W has overhead trackage rights on several lines, meaning the company may operate trains over them but cannot serve customers on them:

- The Housatonic Railroad between Derby and Danbury.
- CSX between New Haven and North Haven, to access P&W's trackage to Middletown
- The Northeast Corridor between New Haven and New Rochelle, then over the Hell Gate Line and the New York Connecting Railroad to Fresh Pond Junction.
- The Northeast Corridor from Providence to Attleboro, Massachusetts, then the New Bedford Secondary and Fall River Secondary to Fall River. These rights allow access to P&W's operating rights south of Fall River, but are unused, as the tracks south of Fall River are out of service.

==== Former system ====
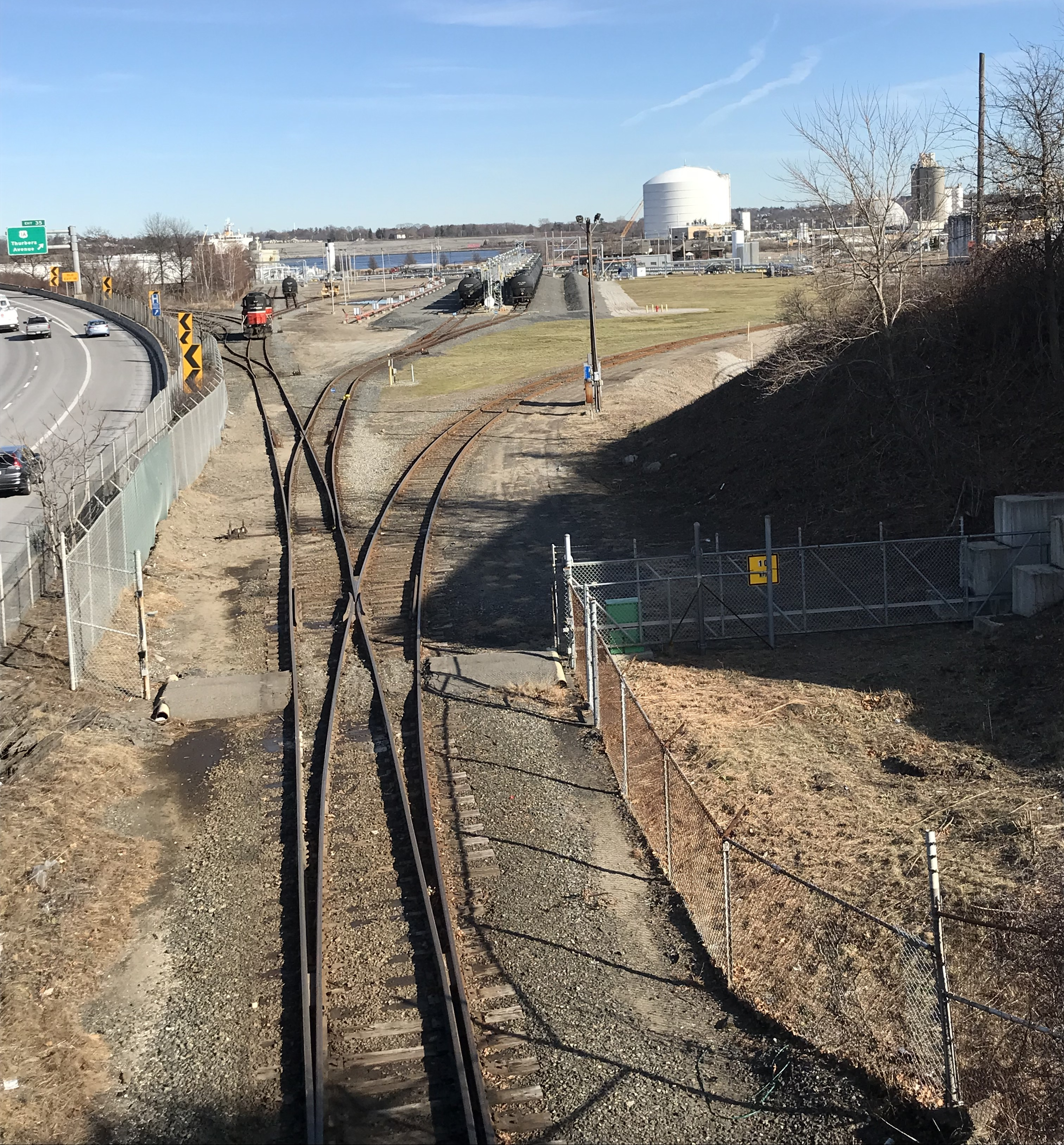
A P&W locomotive idles near parked ethanol tank cars at the Port of Providence

Several lines acquired from Penn Central or Conrail have been abandoned, including:

- The Washington Secondary between Washington and Providence.
- The former Southbridge and Blackstone Railroad between Southbridge and Webster.
- The former Pawtuxet Valley Railroad between Pontiac and Cranston.
- A short spur in Valley Falls.
- The northern portion of the former Moshassuck Valley Railroad in Lincoln.
- The former Providence, Warren and Bristol Railroad from East Providence southward.
- Freight rights on Aquidneck Island, following the closure of the Sakonnet River rail bridge in 1980.

The Providence and Worcester Railroad has been noted for maintaining its tracks to a high standard. Generally, all main lines are maintained to allow a maximum speed of 40 miles per hour (64 km/h). The concern that G&W might reduce these high maintenance standards was raised by a shipper during G&W's acquisition of P&W.

=== Commodities carried ===
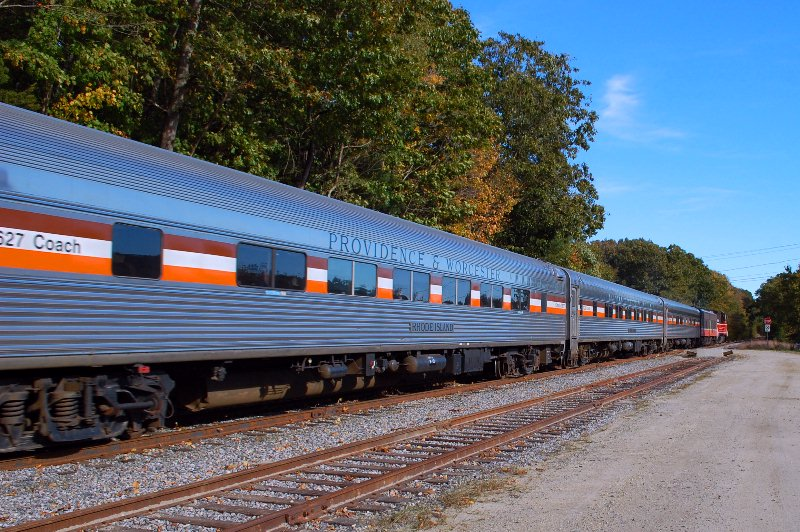
A Providence and Worcester Railroad passenger excursion in 2012

P&W reported carrying 34,402 carloads in 2013. Some significant types of cargo transported by the P&W including construction debris, aggregates, construction materials, lumber, steel, plastics, and chemicals.

P&W formerly transported unit trains of coal to several power plants in New England. The trains originated at ports in Providence and New Haven and were handed off to Pan Am Railways for final delivery. Between 2000 and 2016, the railroad reported hauling more than 21,000 carloads of coal.

Intermodal traffic is carried by P&W between the connection with CSX in Worcester and an intermodal facility just south of Worcester.

The P&W makes a point to serve small customers. An example is Arnold Lumber in West Kingston, Rhode Island. Serving this company, which receives one or two cars of freight at a time, requires P&W trains to travel 5 miles (8.0 km) farther southward on the Northeast Corridor than for any other customer, finding space between Amtrak trains that travel up to 150 miles per hour (240 km/h).

=== Passenger trains ===
The Providence and Worcester does not operate regularly scheduled passenger train service, but has maintained a small fleet of ex-Amtrak passenger cars since the 1980s, which have been used both as a business train for the company and for a variety of chartered passenger trains in Connecticut, Rhode Island, and Massachusetts. The company also operates a Christmas train in November and December of each year. The train, themed on the movie The Polar Express, departs from Woonsocket station and travels along the company's main line, and has operated since 1999.

== Rolling stock ==
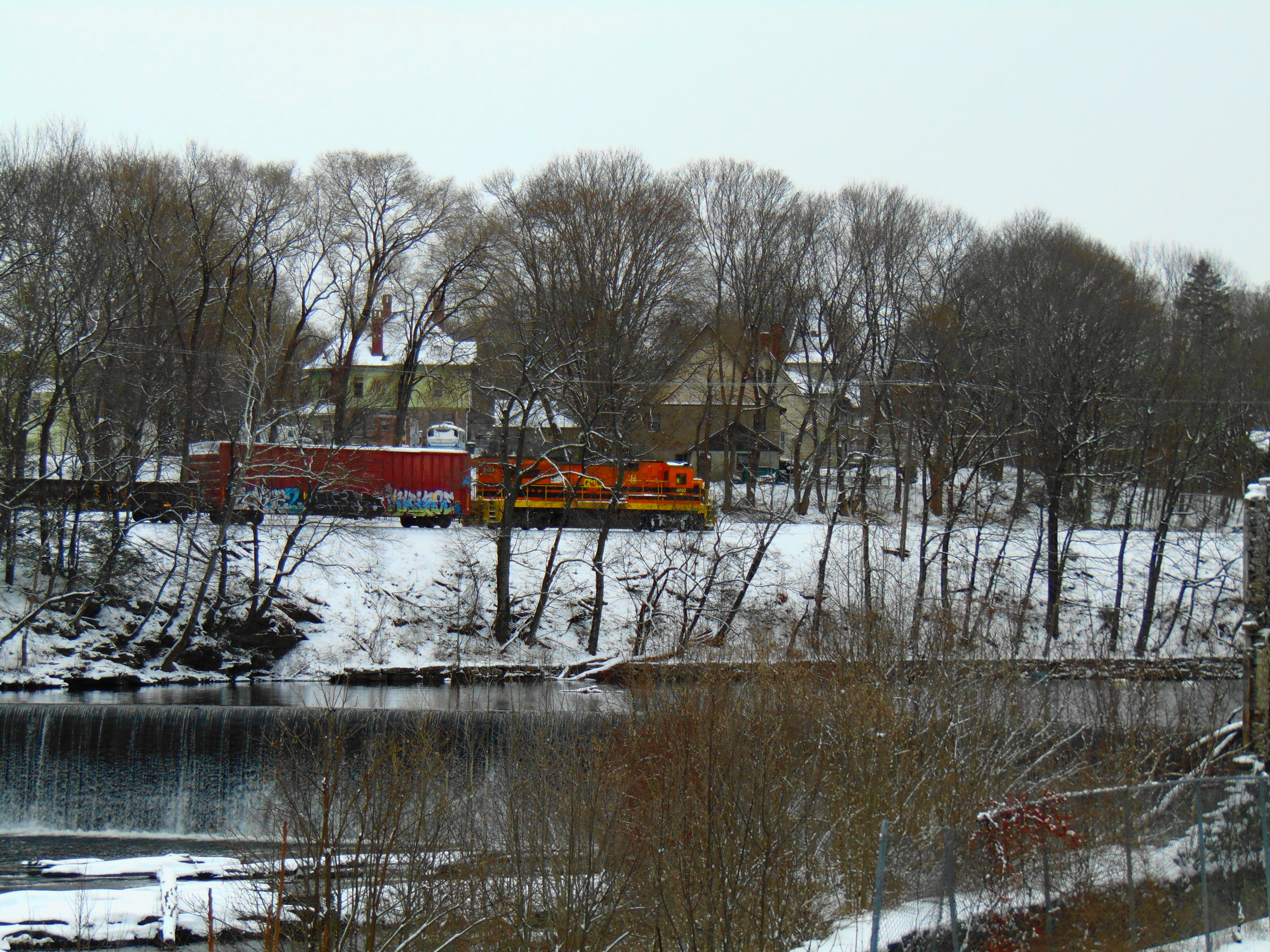
B40-8 4002 in Willimantic, Connecticut, bearing P&W's Genesee & Wyoming colors

As of 2016, the Providence and Worcester Railroad operated the following locomotives:

Locomotive Numbers	Quantity	Model	Remarks
2006-2011	6	EMD GP38-2	2010, 2011 are rebuilt and designated GP38-3
2201	1	GE B23-7	
2215-2216	2	GE B23-7R	
3901-3909	9	GE B39-8	
4001-4004	4	GE B40-8	
4005-4007	3	GE B40-8W	
4301-4302	2	EMD SD70M-2	
9000	1	EMD SD60	Leased from GATX, shared with Vermont Railway

Following the Genesee & Wyoming acquisition, the railroad's motive power has primarily been a variety of EMD locomotives from G&W's fleet. The P&W fleet also operates on connecting G&W shortlines Connecticut Southern Railroad and New England Central Railroad.

== Real estate ==
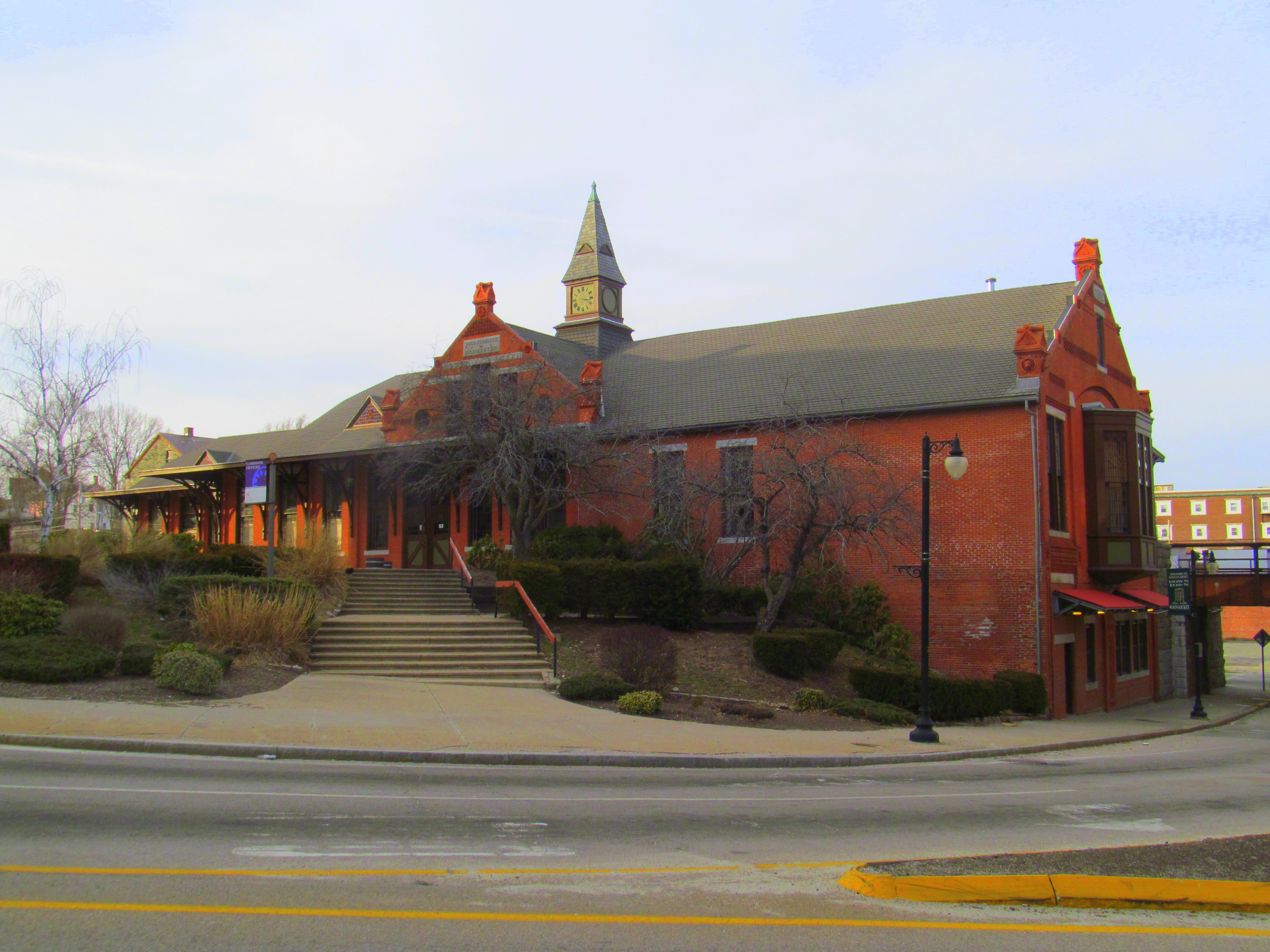
Woonsocket Station in February 2016

For many years, the Providence and Worcester Railroad held real estate in Rhode Island and Massachusetts. P&W retained ownership of parts of the Northeast Corridor upon gaining independence; following Amtrak's assumption of passenger service on the corridor in 1976, it signed an agreement with P&W in 1978 to take ownership of P&W-owned parts of the corridor in exchange for making P&W's freight rights on Amtrak lines permanent.

In 1976, the railroad began building the South Quay Marine Terminal in East Providence, next to the terminus of the East Providence Branch. P&W filled in a portion of the Providence River and planned to turn it into a major shipping facility, but failed to find a partner to develop the project. The land went unused for decades, and P&W finally sold it in 2019 to RI Waterfront Enterprises, which in September 2022 began developing the site to support construction of wind turbines.

Several P&W-built stations are preserved. In addition to the Woonsocket station, which still sees seasonal passenger service from P&W's Polar Express trains, freight or passenger stations also exist in Manville, Rhode Island; Uxbridge, Massachusetts (Uxbridge station); and Whitinsville, Massachusetts.

== Station listing ==
The following stations all had passenger train service, unless noted. Passenger train service on the main line ended in 1957, apart from the non-stopping State of Maine Express; the East Providence Branch had passenger service only from 1893 to 1896.

Main Line
Station	Miles (km)	Comments
Providence	0.0 (0.0)	Junction with the New York, Providence and Boston Railroad and the Providence, Warren and Bristol Railroad
Woodlawn	3.5 (5.6)	
Pawtucket-Central Falls	4.5 (7.2)	Replaced separate Pawtucket and Central Falls stations in 1916
Boston Switch	4.9 (7.9)	Not a station – junction with the Boston and Providence Railroad
Valley Falls	5.9 (9.5)	Junction with the East Providence Branch and the Rhode Island and Massachusetts Railroad
Lonsdale	6.8 (10.9)	
Berkeley	8.6 (13.8)	
Ashton	9.2 (14.8)	
Albion	10.7 (17.2)	
Manville	12.2 (19.6)	
Hamlet	15.2 (24.5)	
Woonsocket	15.8 (25.4)	Junction with the Charles River Railroad and the Woonsocket and Pascoag Railroad 0.3 miles (0.5 km) to the west
Blackstone	17.5 (28.2)	Junction with the Southbridge and Blackstone Railroad and Norfolk County Railroad
Millville	19.7 (31.7)	
Uxbridge	24.3 (39.1)	
Whitins	26.3 (42.3)	
Riverdale	29.4 (47.3)	
Northbridge	30.6 (49.2)	
Farnumsville	32.6 (52.5)	
Saundersville	34.0 (54.7)	
Wilkinsonville	34.7 (55.8)	
Millbury	37.3 (60.0)	
South Worcester	42.4 (68.2)	Junction with the Norwich and Worcester Railroad and the Western Railroad
Worcester	43.3 (69.7)	Junction with the Worcester and Nashua Railroad and the Boston and Worcester Railroad

East Providence Branch
Station	Milepost (km)	Comments
Valley Falls	0.0 (0.0)	Junction with main line and the Rhode Island and Massachusetts Railroad
Darlington	1.7 (2.7)	
Phillipsdale	4.7 (7.6)	
East Providence	6.5 (10.4)	Junction with the East Junction Branch (Boston and Providence Railroad)

== See also ==
- List of New York, New Haven and Hartford Railroad precursors
- Railroads in New England
