= Valley Falls train collision =

Train wreck in Valley Falls, Rhode Island, US

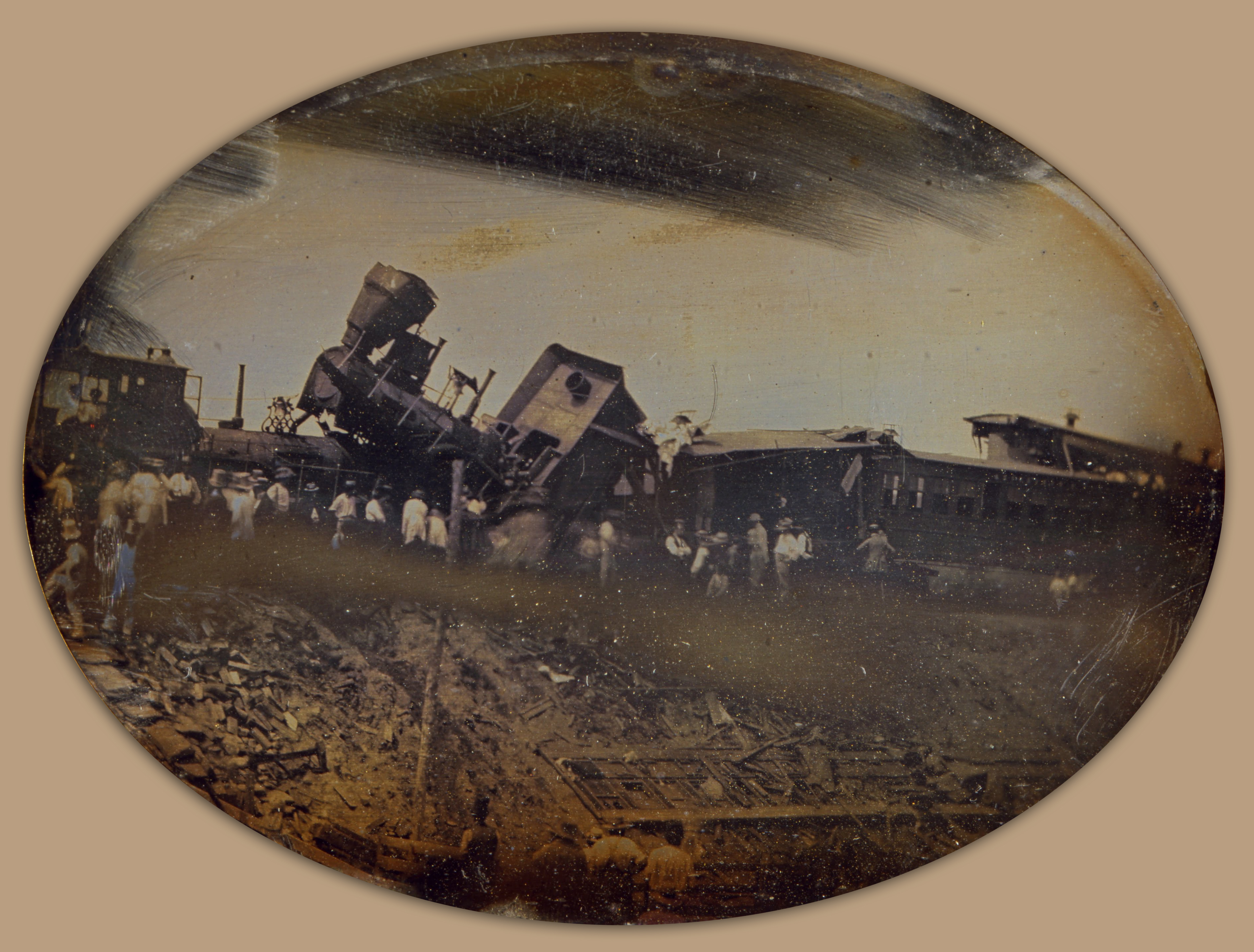
- A daguerreotype of the collision taken shortly after it occurred

- Location of the collision within Rhode Island Valley Falls train collision (the United States)

Details
- Date: August 12, 1853; Approximately 8:00 a.m.
- Location: Valley Falls, Rhode Island
- Coordinates: 41°53′41″N 71°23′09″W
- Country: United States
- Operator: Providence and Worcester Railroad
- Incident type: Collision
- Cause: Human error

Statistics
- Trains: 2
- Deaths: 14
- Injured: 17

On August 12, 1853, two Providence and Worcester Railroad passenger trains collided head-on in Valley Falls, Rhode Island. The collision took place between a southbound excursion train and a regularly scheduled northbound train. The accident resulted in 14 fatalities and a further 17 serious injuries; an unknown number of passengers suffered less severe injuries.

The investigation into the accident found the conductor of the southbound train responsible, as he allowed his train to proceed south with only four minutes of time available rather than the five mandated by the timetable to clear a section of single track between Valley Falls and Pawtucket before a northbound train was due. The use of timetables and personal watches to avoid accidents, instead of a proper railroad signaling system, was also found to be unsafe. Following the collision, the Providence and Worcester Railroad installed double track on its mainline to prevent another collision from occurring. A coordinated railroad time was mandated in wake of the wreck, forming the first time zone in the United States. The collision is believed to be the first to ever be photographed.

== Background ==
The Providence and Worcester Railroad main line included a section of single track between the station in Valley Falls, Rhode Island, and the junction with the Boston and Providence Railroad to the south in nearby Pawtucket. Train movements were scheduled according to a timetable to avoid collisions, and the conductor of each train was responsible for ensuring the train kept to its schedule and also keeping their watch accurate to the railroad's established time.

== Incident ==
Two trains were scheduled to pass by Valley Falls station on the morning of August 12, 1853. Departing southbound from Uxbridge, Massachusetts, at 6:30 a.m. was a special excursion train of eight cars carrying approximately 475 vacationers heading for Providence and ultimately the beaches of Narragansett Bay. Meanwhile, a regular northbound passenger train with two cars and approximately 50 passengers departing Providence at 7:20 a.m. was scheduled to stop at Valley Falls on its way to Worcester. The northbound train was pressed for time, as another train was scheduled approximately 10 minutes later departing Providence towards Boston. The southbound train was several minutes behind schedule, and therefore rushing to cover the distance between Valley Falls and Pawtucket before the northbound train arrived. The engineer of the northbound train, who was expecting the southbound train, waited at Pawtucket for five minutes per the timetable plus an additional minute, and then proceeded onto the single track section at a slow speed. At approximately 8 a.m., just after rounding a curve, the northbound train was struck by the excursion, which was travelling at an estimated 40 miles per hour (60 km/h). The southbound train was severely damaged, with the locomotive and the first passenger car destroyed; the third car telescoped into the second car. Damage was also heavy on the northbound train, but its passengers fared far better than those in the excursion.

== Aftermath ==
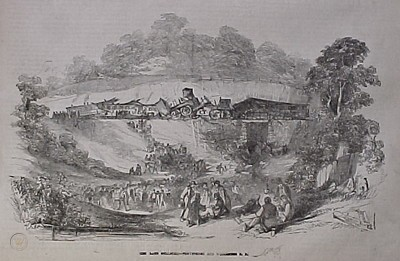
Newspaper drawing of the accident

Fourteen people were killed and seventeen severely injured in the collision; numerous others had less severe injuries. A man identified as L. Wright from Pawtucket happened upon the accident and captured a daguerreotype minutes after it occurred. Wright is believed to have taken the first ever photograph of a train wreck. His daguerreotype was the basis of a woodcut illustration published in The Illustrated News of New York, a short-lived newspaper owned by P. T. Barnum, on August 27, 1853.

A Boston and Providence Railroad passenger train leaving Providence en route to Boston observed the wreck and stopped to assist the victims. A doctor who happened to be on board began helping those injured, most of whom were transported to the Pawtucket station for treatment. The next regularly scheduled train stopping at Valley Falls happened upon the wreck and those on board began working to clear it.

The collision was widely covered in media of the day, and it was reported that several thousand people viewed the wreck in the days afterward.

=== Investigation ===
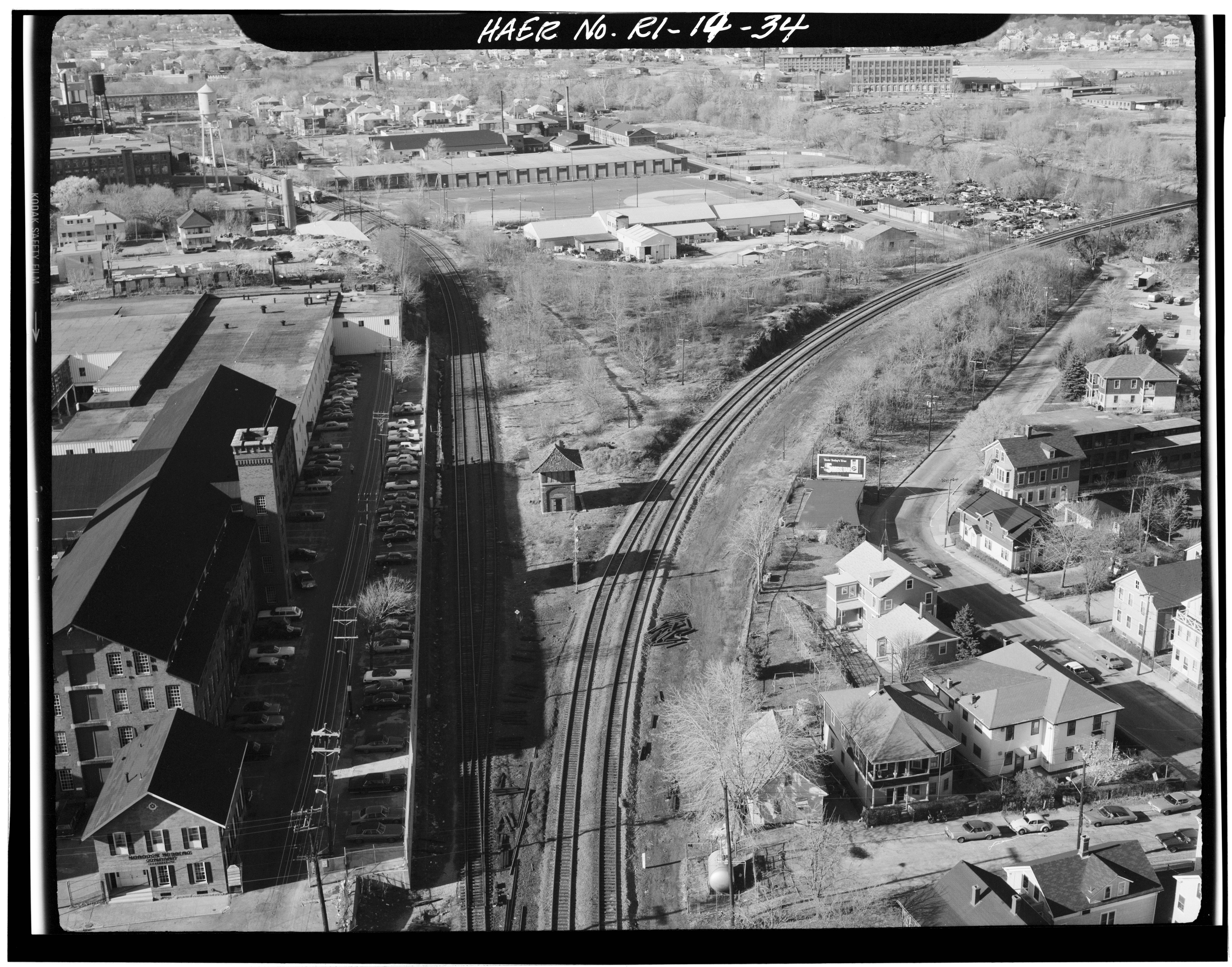
Boston switch, circa 1970. The P&W main line splits off to the left from the B&P main line. The site of the collision was just past the curve where a number of freight cars are visible.

The coroner's inquest held in the wake of the disaster found multiple causes for the collision. Chiefly, the southbound train left Valley Falls station too late - conductor Frederick W. Putnam's watch showed his train only had four minutes to reach the double track in Pawtucket instead of the five minutes required by the timetable. It was also found his watch was two minutes behind the actual time, even though Putnam had set it according to the company's established time in Providence the previous night. Putnam was therefore found liable for not having a reliable timepiece and for his "culpable carelessness, inexperience, and want of judgement".

Some responsibility was assigned to the northbound train as well. The train's crew was not ready to start the train at the designated time, instead taking an additional minute to begin moving. Had the train departed a minute earlier, it would have been past the curve north of Boston Switch (the point where the Providence and Worcester Railroad main line diverged from the Boston and Providence Railroad main line) and visible from Valley Falls station, making it likely the collision could have been averted.

Guilt was also found on the part of the Providence and Worcester Railroad in assigning Putnam to the train despite him having little experience. This particular train was described as "one of the most difficult, if not the most difficult" train for a conductor to be responsible for out of all trains run on the railroad. It was also established that the southbound train had a history of running behind schedule ever since Putnam had been assigned to it, but no action was taken by the company to address the issue. Management also shared in blame for not ensuring that all conductors working for the company had reliable watches.

Finally, the practice of controlling trains solely by timetable, and that trains were scheduled so closely together, was found to be fundamentally unsafe. The inquest decried the lack of a signal between Valley Falls station and the curve which might have warned the southbound train of the other train's approach.

Putnam was arrested on charges of manslaughter on August 17; the railroad's president declined to pay his bail of $10,000, but a citizen secured his release by a surety agreement. A retrospective article in The Valley Breeze was unable to find a record of Putnam's fate, other than determining both he and Ephraim Gates, the engineer of the southbound train, were fired by the railroad. A ledger rediscovered by the Blackstone Historical Society in 2008 listed $43,876 (equivalent to $1.7 million in 2024 dollars) in payments from the railroad to the victims and their families.

=== Safety changes ===
The Providence and Worcester Railroad had been considering installation of a second track along its main line, but worried about the expected cost of over half a million dollars ($19,400,000 in 2024 dollars). The accident proved pivotal in spurring management to go ahead with double-tracking of the main line to prevent such an accident from ever happening again, and work began shortly afterwards. Across New England, a coordinated railroad time was required to be adopted by all the region's railroad companies following the accident, ultimately leading to many communities along rail lines also adopting a standardized time. An electrical railroad signal system was opened between Providence and Boston Switch in 1882 and extended to the rest of the Providence and Worcester Railroad main line in 1884.
