= Thomas Willis Pratt =

American engineer

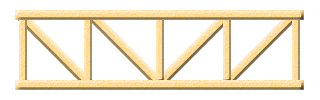
Thomas and Caleb's Pratt Truss

Thomas Willis Pratt (1812–1875) was an American engineer. He is best known for his 1844 patent for the Pratt truss, which he designed with his father, Caleb Pratt. Pratt also surveyed the route of the Providence and Worcester Railroad in 1844. He was born in Boston, Massachusetts in 1812 and died in 1875.
