= GE Dash 8-40BW =

Locomotive built by General-Electric (GE)

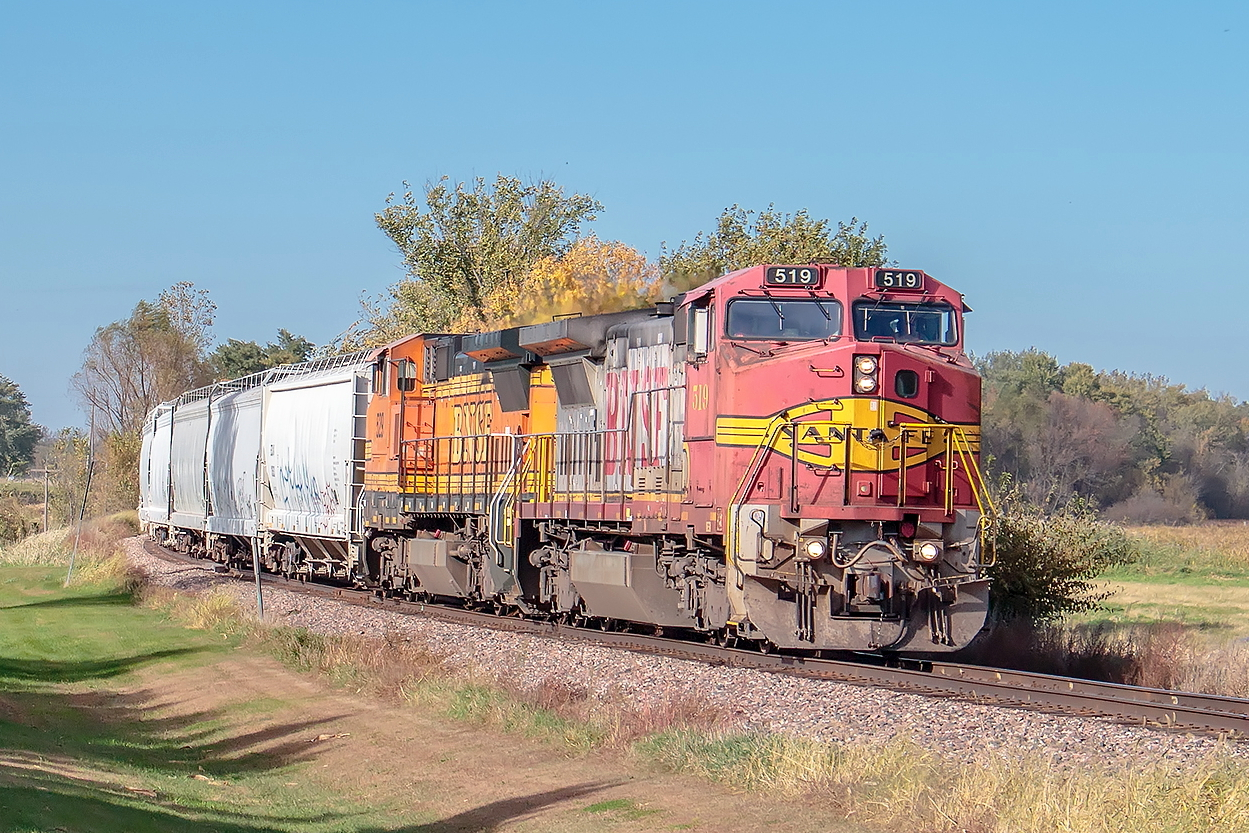
- A duo of ex-Santa Fe Dash 8-40BWs leading a BNSF train, with No. 519 leading.
Type and origin
- Power type: Diesel-electric
- Builder: GE Transportation
- Model: Dash 8-40BW
- Build date: 1990–1992
- Total produced: 84
Specifications
- Configuration
  - AAR: B-B
- Gauge: 4 ft 8 1/2 in (1,435 mm)
- Wheel diameter: 40 in (1.016 m)
- Wheelbase: 9 ft 0 in (2.74 m)
- Length: 66 ft 4 in (20.22 m)
- Width: 10 ft 1.5 in (3.09 m)
- Height: 15 ft 4.5 in (4.69 m)
- Loco weight: 280,000 lb (127,006 kg)
- Prime mover: GE FDL
Performance figures
- Maximum speed: 70 mph (113 km/h)
- Power output: 4,000 hp (3,000 kW)
- Tractive effort: 68,000 lb (30,844 kg)
Career
- Operators: See tables
- Class: B40-8W
- Locale: Western United States
- Disposition: Two preserved, most in storage, remainder in service

The GE Dash 8-40BW, or B40-8W, is a four-axle diesel locomotive built by GE Transportation for the Atchison, Topeka and Santa Fe Railway (ATSF) between 1990 and 1992. It is part of the GE Dash 8 Series of freight locomotives.

The locomotive model designation is interpreted as follows: B (B type truck arrangement, 2 axles per truck) 40 (4000 horsepower) -8 (the generation when it was designed, in this case meaning the late 1980s) W (Widecab).

ATSF was the only railroad to order the B40-8W, and a B unit (cabless booster unit) was almost made with it, but because the price would have been the same for B40-8Ws with cabs or without, they decided to order units with cabs only.

All of ATSF's B40-8Ws were passed on to BNSF Railway, with some later sold to other railroads.

== Disposition ==
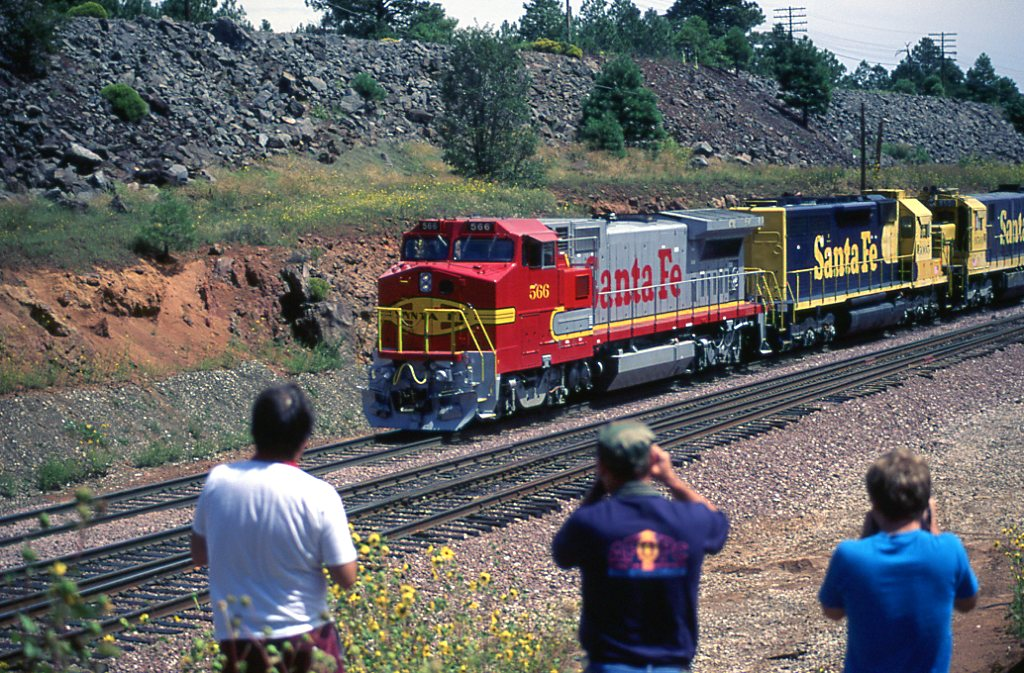
Santa Fe Dash 8-40BW no. 566 leading a freight train at Williams Junction.

While originally built for high-speed intermodal service, by the mid-2000s the B40-8Ws had been bumped to local service.

In mid-2010, BNSF put 15 B40-8Ws up for sale. These units were on long-term lease and were returned to their lessor. As of 2016, three units are operated by the Providence and Worcester Railroad in New England. The rest of BNSF's B40-8W fleet is, as of 2019, undergoing rebuild and refreshment at GE as preparation for their new role as local freight units.

== Original owners ==
Image	Railroad	Quantity	Road numbers	Notes
	Atchison, Topeka and Santa Fe Railway	83	500-582	531 was wrecked at Tejon, NM in December 1995. 576 destroyed at Cajon Pass in December 1994. 537 preserved at the Railroading Heritage of Midwest America.
	General Electric	1	809	wide cab prototype and testbed, rebuilt from B39-8E no. 808

== Current owners ==
Image	Railroad	Quantity	Former ATSF/BNSF Numbers	Notes
	BNSF Railway	60	Ex-Santa Fe; no's 500-559.	Unit 537 donated in 2023. Units 560-575, 577-582 sold
	Providence and Worcester Railroad	3	Ex-BNSF 561, 562 and 582	
	Nashville and Eastern Railroad	4	Ex-BNSF 568, 573, 574 and 579	To RJ Corman
	Arkansas - Oklahoma Railroad	3	Ex-BNSF 567, 578, and 581	
	Great Western Railway of Saskatchewan	2	Ex-BNSF 575 and 563	

== Preservation ==
- ATSF No. 537 is preserved at the Railroading Heritage of Midwest America in Silvis, Illinois. It was donated by BNSF on June 14, 2023, making it the first of the type to be preserved. In October 2024, the locomotive was repainted back to its ATSF Warbonnet colors.
- ATSF No. 534 is currently under restoration by BUGX, and it will operate for New Mexico Heritage Rail as a support engine for Santa Fe 2926.

== See also ==
- List of GE locomotives
