= Connecticut Central Railroad (1987) =

Defunct railroad in Connecticut

Overview
- Current operator: Providence and Worcester Railroad
- Headquarters: Middletown, CT
- Reporting mark: CCCL
- Locale: Middlesex County, Connecticut
- Dates of operation: 1987–1998
- Predecessor: Conrail
- Successor: Providence and Worcester Railroad

Technical
- Track gauge: 4 ft 8 1/2 in (1,435 mm) standard gauge
- Length: 17.9 miles (28.8 km)

The Connecticut Central Railroad (reporting mark CCCL) was a short-line railroad in the Middletown, Connecticut, area from 1987 to 1998. It was formed to operate Conrail trackage in the area that was slated for abandonment. The Connecticut Central Railroad was purchased by the Providence and Worcester Railroad in 1998, which has operated its lines since.

== History ==
=== Creation ===
In 1986, Conrail filed for abandonment of trackage in and around Middletown, Connecticut: the so-called "Middletown Cluster". The Connecticut Department of Environmental Protection purchased the rail facilities in this area for $3.4 million in state bonds; in 1987 it was transferred to the Connecticut Department of Transportation.

Members of the Valley Railroad agreed to take over rail operations from Conrail, in coordination with the city of Middletown and local businesses, and formed the Connecticut Central Railroad for this purpose. The railroad was contracted to do the restoration of the tracks, road beds, and highway crossings and to restore rail service on the Wethersfield Secondary between Middletown and Hartford, and between Middletown and Maromas, the northern end of the Valley Railroad's property. The DEP was responsible for contracting the repair of the Middletown Swing Bridge over the Connecticut River to Portland.

=== Independence ===
Operations began on March 26, 1987, with transfers arranged with Conrail at Cedar Hill Yard. Business was at above projected levels until 1990, when traffic dropped by one third due to the recession, in addition to the closure of a major customer. As a result, the Valley Railroad sold the CCCL to a group of investors. The same year, a sludge-hauling contact with the City of Middletown was signed, and in 1992, a large steel operation began providing business to the railroad. This kept the railroad from falling to bankruptcy.

=== Buyout ===
After years of profitable operation, the railroad looked for expansion. The Wethersfield Secondary was only operated as far north as Cromwell, and the railroad looked to extend operations up to the Connecticut Southern Railroad's Hartford Terminal at the north end of the line. The state awarded the rights to the CCCL, and subsequently the Providence and Worcester Railroad bought the company and began their operations in April 1998. This was around the time Conrail was bought and split between CSX Transportation and Norfolk Southern.

Connecticut Central president Russel St. John stated the company sold its operations to P&W because the latter had "a lot more resources" to support rebuilding of the line to Hartford and expand freight service. Under P&W, reconstruction of the line, which was out of service for more than 30 years, was completed in 2001. By 2000, annual carloads had jumped to 1,500 per year in the Middletown area, a 60 percent increase from Connecticut Central's volume pre-purchase.

== Operations ==
The Connecticut Central Railroad primarily hauled pulpboard, lumber, fertilizer, chemicals, brick, and steel. Many of these customers are still around as customers for the Providence and Worcester.

The following is a list of lines operated, with the customers served:

- Middletown Secondary Line, from New Haven to Middletown, 7.3 miles long (Mileposts 15.0 to 22.3)
- Laurel Industrial Track, from Middletown Center to Maromas, 5.5 miles long (Mileposts 0.0 to 5.5)
- Portland Industrial Track, from Middletown to Portland, 1 mile long (Mileposts 0.0 to 1.0)
- East Berlin Industrial Track, in Middletown, 1.2 miles long (Mileposts 0.0 to 1.2)
  - MSR Brick (brick), current customer
  - Primary Steel (steel), current customer
- Cromwell Industrial Track, Middletown to Cromwell, 2.5 miles long (Mileposts 13.7 to 16.2)
- Wethersfield Secondary, Cromwell to Hartford
