= Sally (ship) =

Several ships have been named Sally:

- Sally (1764 ship), a Rhode Island 100-ton brigantine slave ship
- Sally (1782 ship) was launched at Liverpool as a West Indiaman. She made one voyage as a whaler and one as an East Indiaman sailing to Bengal under charter to the British East India Company (EIC). After a storm damaged her in 1805 as she was on her way in 1805 from Liverpool to Africa as a slave ship she had to put into Barbados where she was condemned.
- Sally was built in France in 1774 almost surely under another name. The British captured her in 1781 and she began sailing as Sally first as a transport and then as a West Indiaman. Liverpool merchants purchased her and she became Britannia in 1787. She then sailed to the Baltic and Russia. She was wrecked in 1793.
- Sally (1783 ship) was launched in France in 1775 under another name, possibly as Enterprize. She became a Bristol-based slave ship. Under the name Sally she made three enslaving voyages between 1783 and 1786. Then from 1787 on as King George she made three more complete enslaving voyages. She was lost at Barbados in 1791 on her seventh voyage with the loss of 280 of the 360 captives on board.
- Sally (1788 ship), of 350 or 367 tons, by one report had been launched in 1770 at Rhode Island, possibly under another name. Lloyd's Register (LR) showed her being built in Britain, having been lengthened and raised in 1780 at Dantzig, and having undergone a good repair in 1786. She was registered at Liverpool in 1788 as a slave ship in the triangular trade in enslaved people. Captain James Milbanke sailed from Liverpool on 9 July 1788 and he died on 21 December. She embarked 168 captives and she arrived at Grenada, under the command of Thomas Fleming in February 1791, with 40, for a 76% mortality rate. She had left Liverpool with 37 crew members and had suffered nine crew deaths on her voyage. She did not leave Grenada, having been sold, abandoned, or condemned there.

== See also ==
- MS Viking Sally, the Sally, a Viking line cruise-ferry ship
- ST Empire Sally, the Sally, a WW2 Empire Ship, a British steam tug
- Sally (disambiguation)
