= Joseph Brown House (Providence, Rhode Island) =

- Joseph Haile House
- U.S. National Historic Landmark District – Contributing property
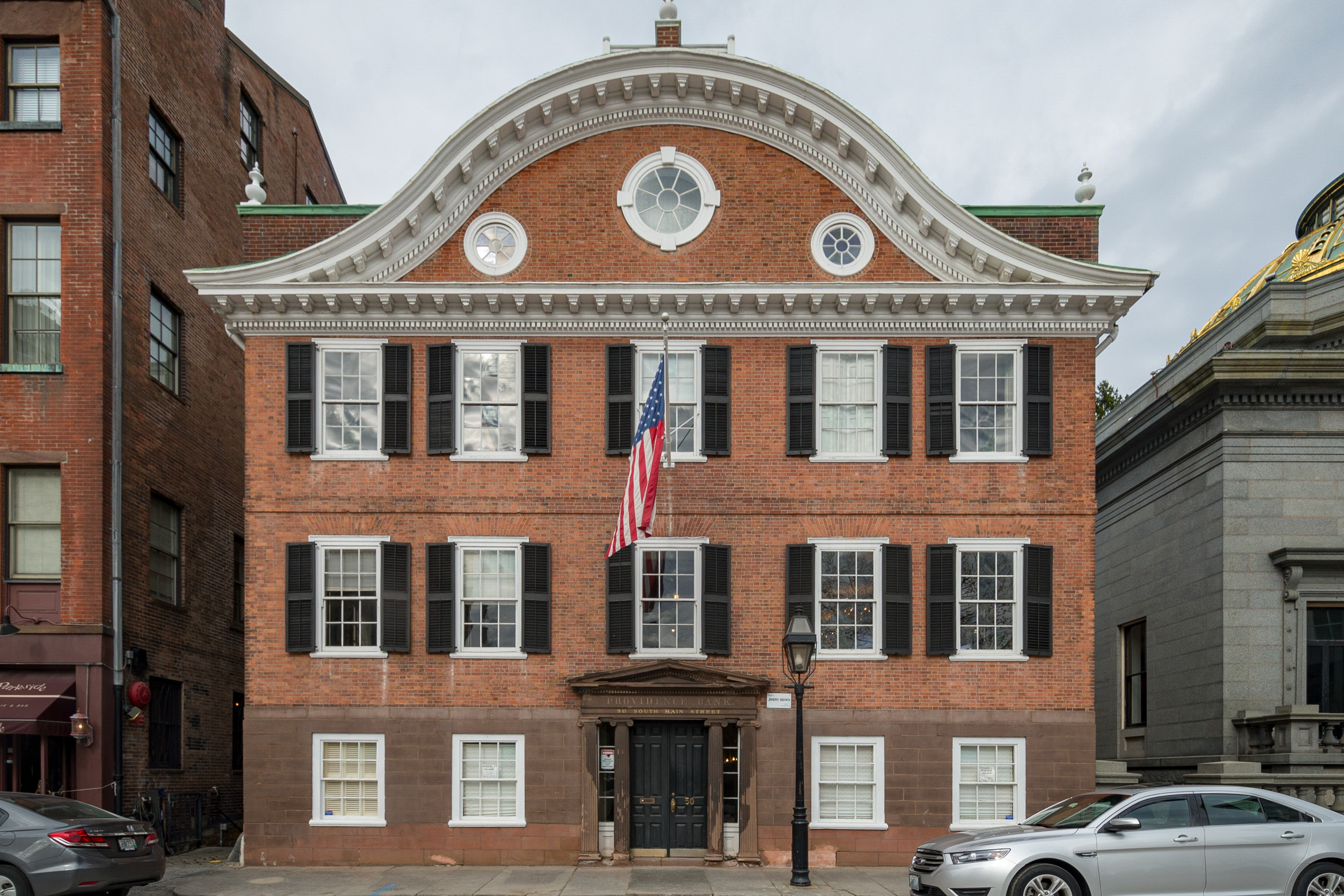

- Location within Rhode Island Location within the United States
- Location: 50 South Main Street, Providence, Rhode Island
- Coordinates: 41.82474°N 71.40697°W
- Built: 1774
- Architectural style: Georgian
- Part of: College Hill Historic District

The Joseph Brown House is a historic Georgian house, located at 50 South Main Street Providence, Rhode Island. The building, designed by astronomer and amateur architect Joseph Brown, is the oldest extant house built by an American architect for his own use.

== Architecture ==
The street-facing portion of the structure measures roughly 45 feet (14 m) in both height and width. Its facade, defined by five bays, rises two stories above an elevated, street level basement. The residence's entrance was originally raised above ground and accessed via symmetrical flights of stairs; in the late 18th century, the entrance was moved to street level. The structure's foundation is constructed of brownstone ashlar, while the raised volume of the house is made of Flemish and common bond brick.

The structure is noted for its ogee curved gable roof, which is decorated with a white trellised parapet and balustrade. According to Antoinette Downing, "such a baroque scheme for the exterior was rare even in English building, and harks back to Sir Christopher Wren and the first years of the eighteenth century; Colen Campbell, in his Vitruvius Britannicus of 1717, published an engraved plate of a house similar to Brown's, with the gable end treated as a broken scroll."

In the 1920s, a rear wing was added to the house.

== History ==
The structure was constructed in 1774 by architect, Joseph Brown, of the prominent mercantile Brown family as his personal residence. During the American Revolution, the house was one of a number of structures used to quarter French troops.

In 1801, the structure was acquired by the Providence Bank—an enterprise founded by Brown's brothers John and Moses—and used as an office. The bank occupied the structure until 1929. The building was subsequently owned by the Counting House Corporation.

In 1970, the structure was designated a contributing property in the College Hill Historic District.

== Gallery ==
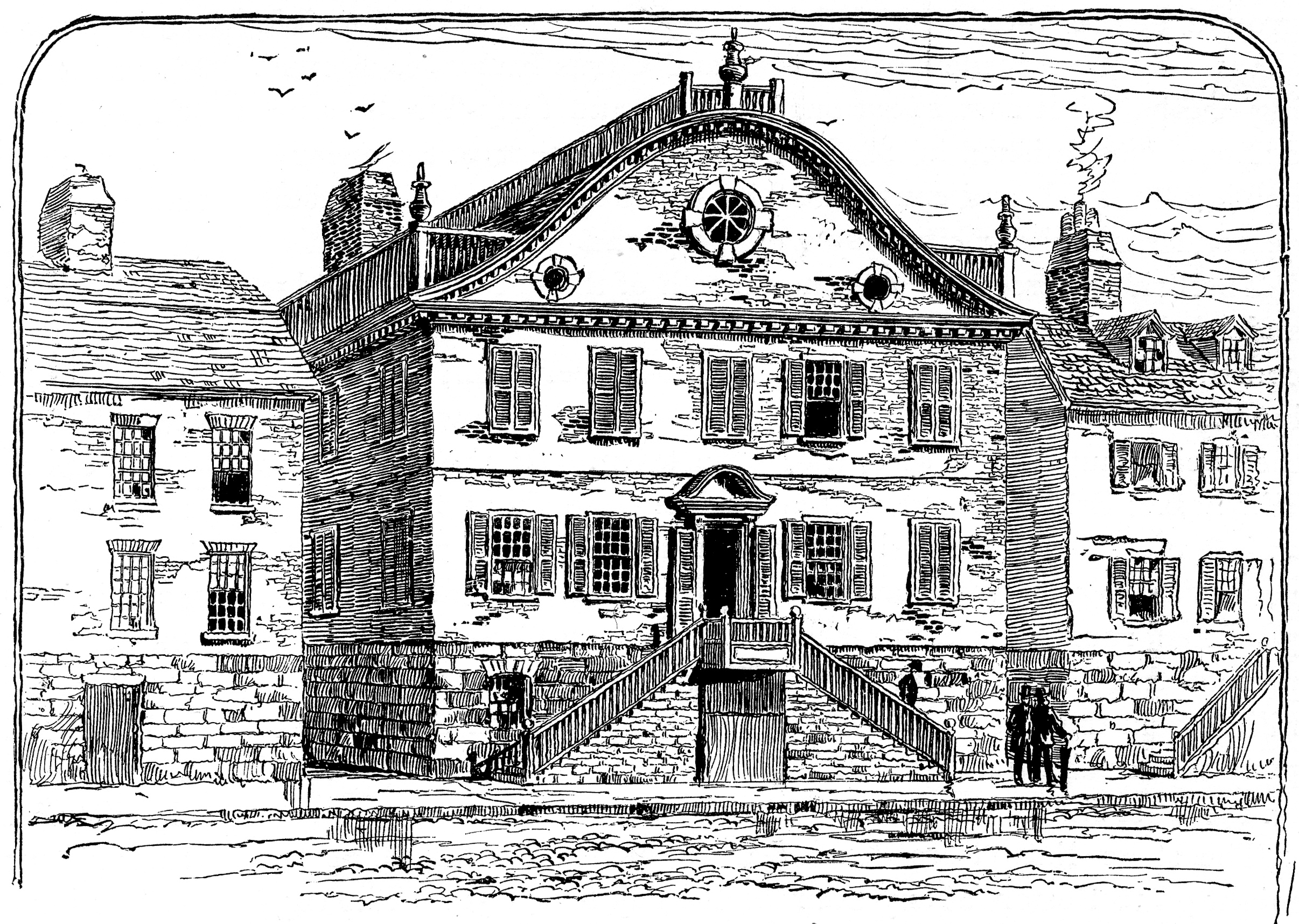
An engraving of the building published in 1886 shows the original entrance and staircase.

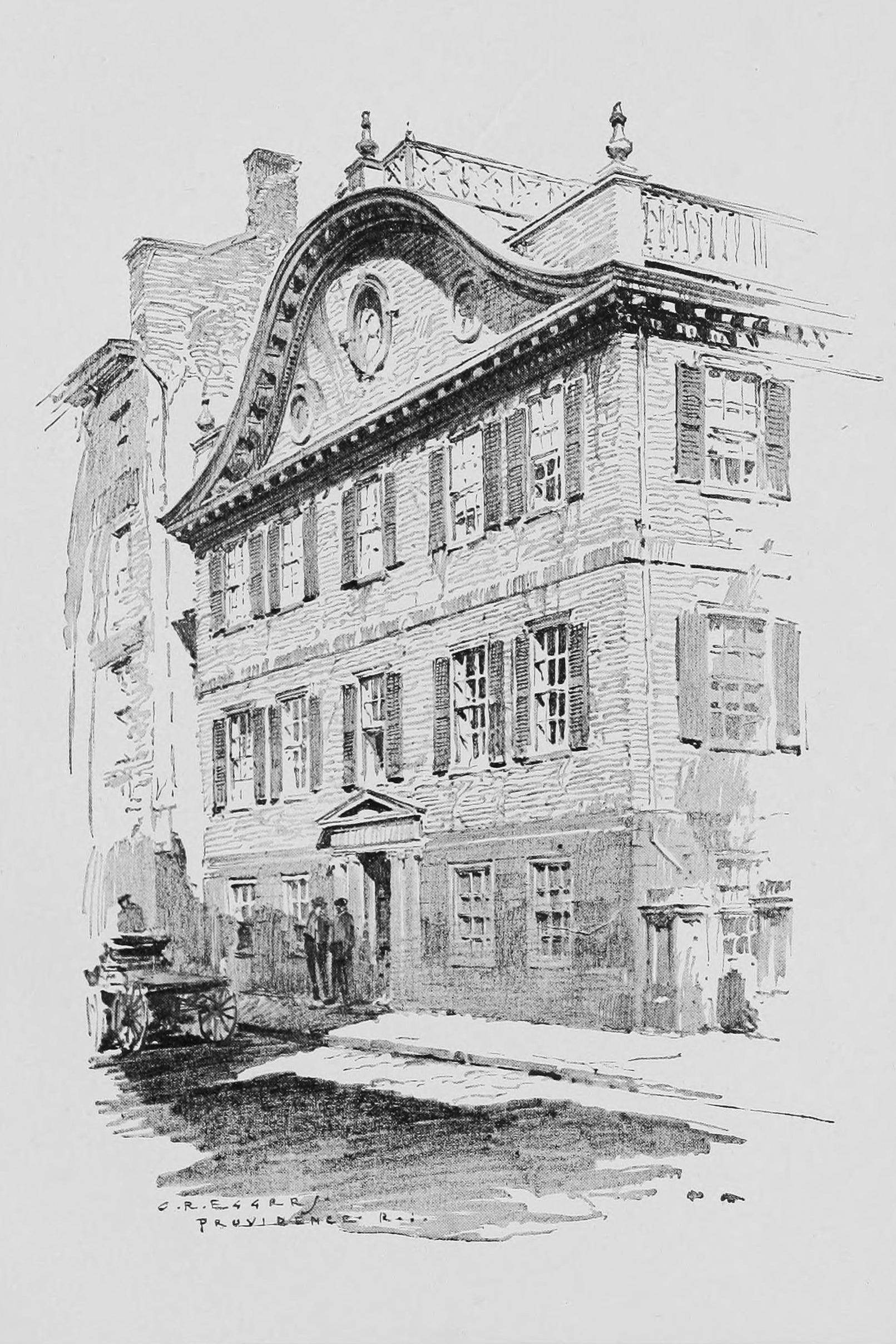
A 1922 drawing depicts the building in its altered form.

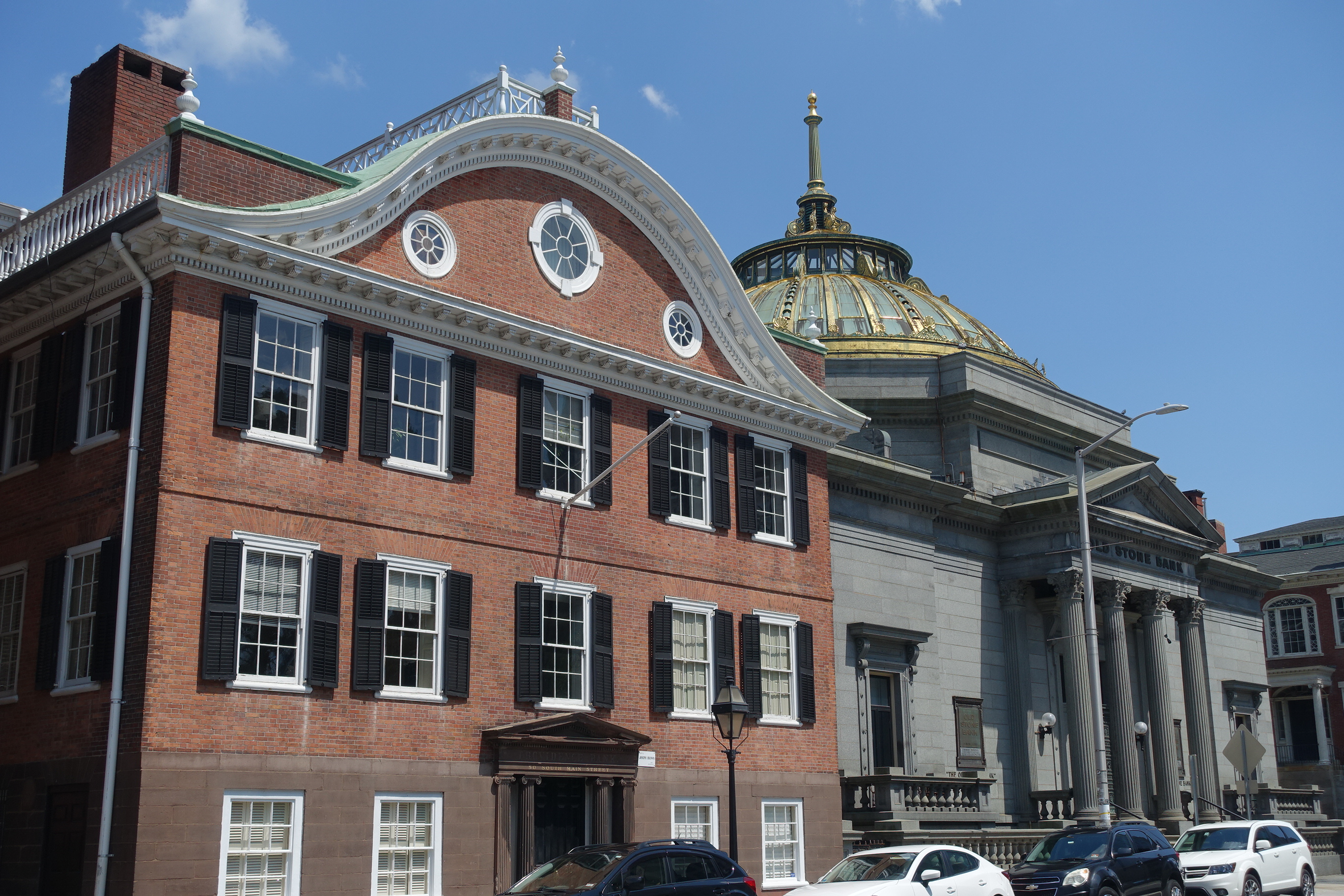
The Joseph Brown House stands immediately adjacent to the Old Stone Bank
