= Henderson Bridge (Rhode Island) =

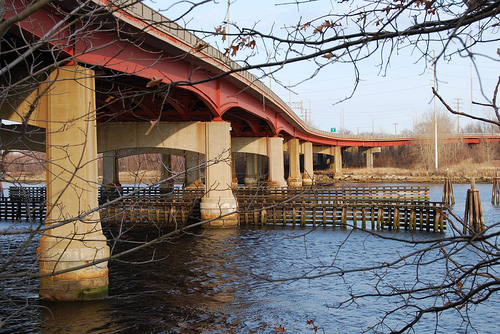
- Henderson Bridge, Rhode Island
- Coordinates: 41.82925°N 71.377833°W
- Carries: Three traffic lanes and one bicycle/pedestrian lane (new bridge), six traffic lanes (old bridge) of the canceled Henderson Expressway
- Crosses: Seekonk River
- Locale: Between Providence and East Providence, Rhode Island
- Other name(s): New Red Bridge
- Owner: Rhode Island Department of Transportation
- Maintained by: Rhode Island Department of Transportation
- ID number: 6000

Characteristics
- Material: Steel
- Total length: 624.8 metres (2,050 ft) (bridge); 1 mile (bridge and completed portion of expressway)
- Width: 29.6 metres (97 ft)
- Clearance below: 12.8 metres (42 ft)

History
- Designer: George Henderson
- Opened: 1969 (old bridge); 2023 (new bridge)
- Closed: 2023 (old bridge)
- Replaces: Swing bridge called Red Bridge built in 1895 (old 1969 bridge); 1969 bridge (new 2023 bridge)

Statistics
- Toll: None

References
- National Bridge Inventory

The Henderson Bridge (also locally and informally known as the New Red Bridge) is a bridge in Rhode Island which spans the Seekonk River, and connects the East Side neighborhood of Providence with the Watchemoket and Phillipsdale neighborhoods of East Providence. After a major reconstruction, the bridge reopened to automobile traffic in phases from November 16 to 20, 2023. A new cycle path opened on November 27. A few weeks later, it was used as a detour during the emergency closure of the westbound half of the parallel Washington Bridge.

== History ==
The old bridge was opened in 1969 to replace a swing bridge to the south, known as the Red Bridge, which connected the ends of Waterman Street on either side of the Seekonk River. Both bridges are named after the old bridge's designer, engineer George Henderson of Rumford, Rhode Island.

=== Previous bridges in the area ===
This is the sixth bridge to have been built in this part of the Seekonk River. The first was a wooden bridge built by Moses Brown in 1793 called the Central Bridge, which connected the respective ends of Waterman Avenue. The same year, Brown's brother John built the first Washington Bridge at a ferry landing point one mile south, connecting India Point and Watchemoket Square. The second and third bridges were built as replacements and were destroyed in 1807 and 1815, respectively. A swing bridge was built in 1872, which was replaced by a sturdier bridge of the same type in 1895.

=== Henderson Expressway ===
From the late 1950s to the mid-1970s, the Henderson Bridge was planned to be part of an expressway, envisioned by the Rhode Island Department of Public Works (RIDPW; now the Rhode Island Department of Transportation, or RIDOT) and the Massachusetts Department of Public Works (MassDPW; now the Massachusetts Department of Transportation, or MassDOT), that would carry a partially relocated and partially upgraded US 44 from Providence to Plymouth, MA. It would have extended from the Interstate 195 interchange with Gano Street east across the west shore of the Seekonk River, over the new bridge, and through East Providence to the existing surface US 44 boulevard (Taunton Avenue) near the Massachusetts border. MassDPW would upgrade the existing US 44 from the Rhode Island border to Taunton and then relocate US 44 to a new dedicated freeway section from Taunton to Plymouth. The bridge and the Rhode Island portion of the expressway were named after then-former RIDPW chief engineer George H. Henderson.

At what would have been the final western terminus of the incomplete expressway at I-195/US 6/US 1A (US 6 and US 1A were re-routed to overlap with I-195 at some point), US 44 would have presumably used a short section of I-195 (a shortened part of its current overlap along I-195) to exit at South Main Street. During the upgrade/construction of I-195/US 6 to full expressway and Interstate status, a trumpet interchange was built at Gano Street to create enough capacity for the never-completed western extension of the Henderson Expressway. These ramps were partially removed, reconfigured, and partially replaced in the mid-to-late 2000s as part of the reconstruction/partial replacement of the Washington Bridge (which carries I-195, US 6, US 44, and US 1A between Providence and East Providence) and the construction of the Iway relocation of I-195 in Providence from I-95 to Gano Street and the Washington Bridge.

From 1961 until the mid-1970s, the Providence City Plan Commission proposed an alternate route for the expressway in Providence, arguing to extend it west through the East Side neighborhood using an out-of-service railroad tunnel (originally built as part of the Providence, Warren and Bristol Railroad) to Downtown Providence to end at I-95 and US 6/Route 10.

Between 1967 and 1969, the first (and only) section to be completed was built, consisting of the bridge itself, its western approach (tying into a partially built interchange with the one-way pair of South Angell Street and Waterman Street), and an eastern approach including two partially-built interchanges at Massasoit Avenue and Broadway in East Providence. Eastbound signage near and at the eastern end of the expressway at Broadway referred to Broadway as being part of Route 152. (RI 152 has its southern terminus to the northwest of this interchange at Route 114 and US 1A; more recently, RIDOT officials have reported not knowing why these signs refer to RI 152 as extending down Broadway and cannot find any surviving records discussing a potential extension of RI 152 down Broadway past the Henderson Expressway towards Taunton Avenue and Waterman Avenue (US 44), I-195/US 6/US 1A, and RI 103. However, they believe there could have been a proposal for (what local roadgeek and historian Steve Anderson refers to as) "part of a larger plan to provide a marked parallel route for US 1A / RI 114 south to I-195 and Veterans [Memorial] Parkway." In their correspondence with Anderson RIDOT referred to the 1969 signs referring to a RI 152 extension as "relics of mid-20th century highway planning processes.") To the east of Broadway, RIDOT purchased the right-of-way for (but did not construct) the never-built eastern extension to Taunton Avenue (US 44) and the East Providence, RI/Seekonk, MA line and state border. However, RIDOT did clear the land to the freeway's proposed end at US 44 (Taunton Avenue). An interchange with Route 114/US 1A (Pawtucket Avenue) was planned to be built as part of this section, before ending at Taunton Avenue just west of the state line and never-built Massachusetts portion of the expressway.

=== 2020s reconstruction ===
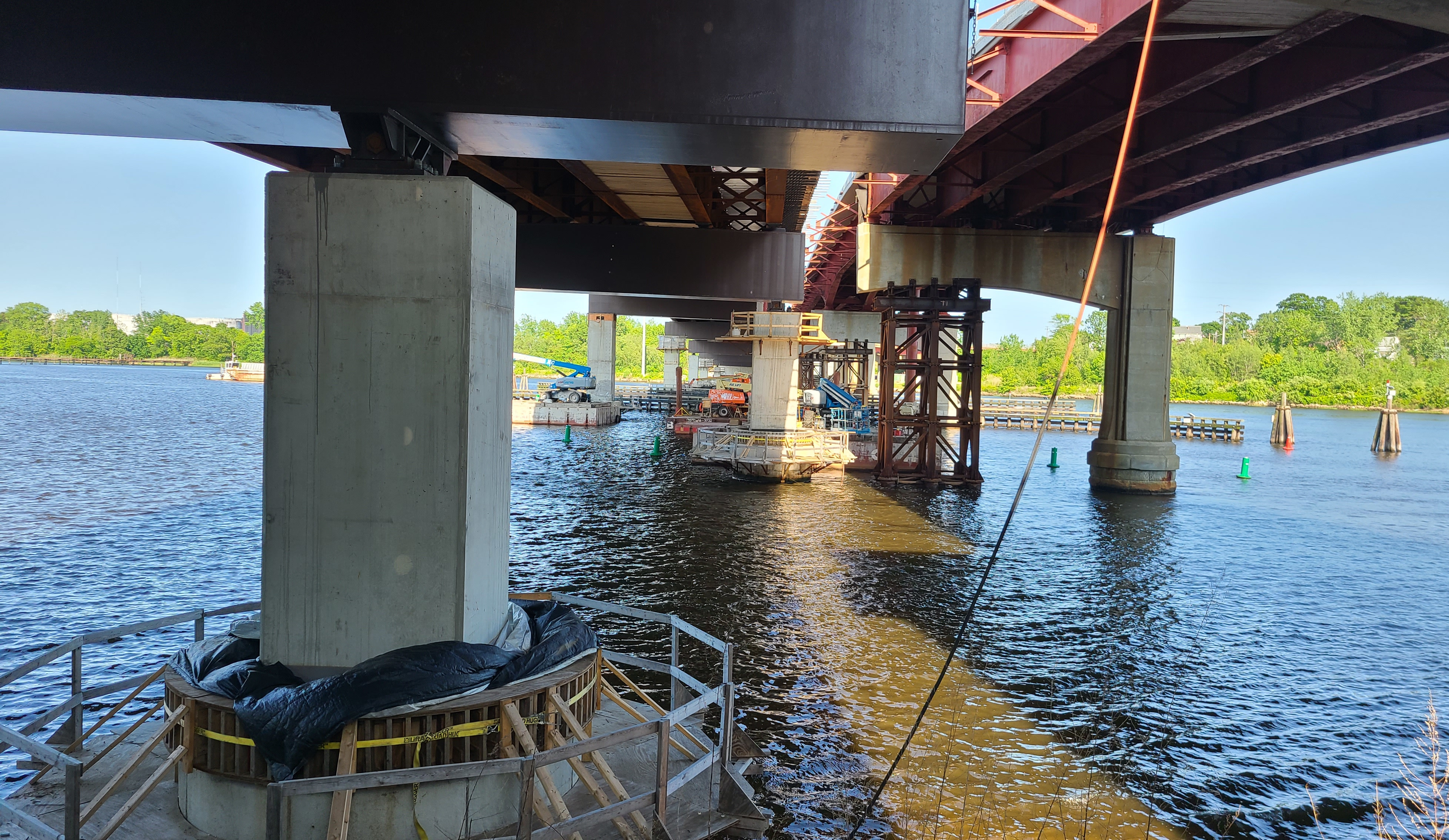
New bridge under construction in May 2023

On April 17, 2008, it was reported that the bridge required $50 million worth of repairs, but the state only had $3.3 million to allocate. Some problems noted are cracks in the concrete pier caps & rusting steel beams. RIDOT chief engineer Kazem Farhoumand has stated that steel reinforcements can be bolted onto the steel beams to make them "good for another 5 or 10 years." The Henderson was one of 25 bridges to receive "minor repairs" in late 2015, after a "hurry-up" program of bridge inspections in August 2015.

Transit and bike advocates have asked for years that the bridge be replaced by a more multimodal structure. In February 2019, it was announced that the existing four lane bridge will be replaced with a new two lane bridge with pedestrian and bike lanes.

Work began on reconstruction in January 2021. The project was expected to cost $84.4 million, with $54.5 million coming from a federal spending bill and the rest from the state. The bridge remained open to traffic, with one half of the bridge closed and rebuilt at a time.

The new bridge features three traffic lanes (instead of the old bridge's six), and a separated bicycle/pedestrian infrastructure with connections to existing on-street bicycle networks. Current interchanges will be converted to roundabouts. While the bridge will include bike/pedestrian infrastructure, the interchange design on the east side of the Seekonk River has faced criticism for a lack of any way for pedestrians or cyclists to safely cross traffic lanes. The rebuild freed 25 acres of land for redevelopment, and also reduced the bridge width to serve local traffic rather than the never-built expressway.

== Under the Bridge ==
Woods and trails under and around the East Providence side of the bridge are often used by dirt-bikers for recreational use. River Road exists beneath the Providence side of the bridge, and provides access to Blackstone Park and Trails (a breach in the fence-line on the westbound side of the bridge near the "South Angell Street" signage provides quick access into the park); (a short path on the eastbound side of the bridge before the ascent onto the bridge provides access to River Road).

== See also ==
- Washington Bridge
- Crook Point Bascule Bridge
