= Sallie =

Sallie may refer to:

== People ==
- Sallie Baliunas (born 1953), astrophysicist
- Sallie W. Chisholm (born 1947), American biological oceanographer
- Sallie Fellows, American politician
- Sallie Fox
- Sallie Ann Glassman (born 1954), American practitioner of Vodou, writer, artist
- Sallie Harmsen (born 1989), Dutch actress
- Sallie-Anne Huckstepp (1954-1986), Australian writer, sex worker and whistleblower
- Sallie Krawcheck (born 1964), American businessperson
- Sallie Manzanet-Daniels, American associate justice
- Sallie A. Marston (born 1953), American social geographer and professor
- Sallie Martin (1895-1988), American gospel singer
- Sallie Ellington Middleton (1926-2009), wildlife watercolor artists
- Sallie Updyke Mundy (born 1962), American associate justice, former judge
- Sallie Patrick, American screenwriter and television producer
- Sallie Permar, American pediatrician, medical leader
- Sallie Ann Robinson, American cookbook author, celebrity chef, and cultural historian
- Sallie Walker Stockard (1869-1963), American professor of history and an author
- Sallie Tisdale (born 1957), American writer and essayist
- Sallie Duke Drake Twitty (1835–1923), American schoolteacher and principal
- Sallie Ada Vance (ca. 1840 - unknown), American poet
- Sallie Wagner (1913-2006), American anthropologist, businesswoman, activist, filmmaker, and arts patron

== Places ==
- Sallie House, historic house located in Atchison, Kansas, U.S.

== Other ==
- Sallie Ford and the Sound Outside, American rock band
- Sallie Ann Jarrett, canine mascot of the 11th Pennsylvania Infantry
- Sallie Mae, a publicly traded U.S. corporation

== See also ==
- Sally (disambiguation)
- Salley (disambiguation)
- Sallee
