= Sally =

Sally or Sallie may refer to:

== People and characters ==
=== Persons ===
- Sally (name), including a list of people and fictional characters with the name
- Sally (internet personality), French influencer and activist
- Axis Sally, the name given to female radio propaganda broadcasters for the Axis in World War II

==== People with the surname ====
- Paul Sally (1933–2013), U.S. mathematician
- Tyrone Sally (born 1982), U.S. basketball player
- Zak Sally, U.S. musician

=== Fictional characters ===
- Sally (The Nightmare Before Christmas), a character in the film The Nightmare Before Christmas
- Sally (Peanuts), a Peanuts comic strip character
- Sally (South Park), a character in the animated TV series South Park
- Sally, a fictional character in the animated series Scaredy Squirrel

== Places ==
- Sally Rocks, Sallys Cove, Hurd Peninsula, South Bay, Livingston Island, South Shetland Islands, Antarctica; a group of islets (rocks)
- Sallys Cove, Hurd Peninsula, South Bay, Livingston Island, South Shetland Islands, Antarctica; a cove, see Sally Rocks
- Sally's Cove, Gros Morne National Park, Newfoundland Island, Newfoundland and Labrador, Canada; a cove
  - Sally's Cove, a hamlet on the cove surrounded by the national park
- Sallys Flat, New South Wales, Australia; a region and a village in the region
- Sally Gap, Wicklow Mountains, Ireland

== Groups, organizations ==
- Sally (band), an indie-rock band from Chicago, Illinois
- South Atlantic League (often informally called the "Sally League"), a former Minor League Baseball league in the United States
- Springfield Sallies, Springfield, Illinois, USA; a women's professional baseball team

=== Businesses ===
- Sally Corporation, a manufacturer of dark rides and animatronics
- Sally Line, an Ålandian passenger shipping company and cruise line
- Rederi Ab Sally, Finnish shipping company
- Sally's Apizza, a pizzeria in New Haven, Connecticut

== Arts, entertainment, media ==
=== Literature ===
- Sally, a detective novel by E.V. Cunningham (aka Howard Fast)
- "Sally" (short story), by Isaac Asimov
- "Sally", a poem by Patti Smith from her book Seventh Heaven

=== Songs ===
- "Sally" (Gogol Bordello song), 2005
- "Sally" (Gracie Fields song), first performed in the film Sally in Our Alley, 1931
- "Sally" (Hardwell song), 2015
- "Sally" (Kerbdog song), 1996
- "Sally", a song by Anthony Phillips from Invisible Men, 1983
- "Sally", a song by Blink-182
- "Sally", a song by Carmel, 1986
- "Sally", a song by Foxboro Hot Tubs from Stop Drop and Roll!!!, 2008
- "Sally", a song by Grand Funk Railroad from Born to Die, 1976
- "Sally", a song by Mike Oldfield from Platinum, 1979
- "Sally", a song by Sade from Diamond Life, 1984
- "Sally", a song by Sam Sparro from Sam Sparro, 2008
- "Sally", a song by Thundamentals, 2017
- "Sally", a song by Vasco Rossi, 1996
- "Sally", a song by Vaya Con Dios from Night Owls, 1990
- "Sally, When the Wine Runs Out", a song by Role Model, 2025

=== Film, stage, television, broadcast ===
- Sally (musical), a 1920 theatre musical
- Small Scale Local Licences (SALLIES), for Independent Local Radio in the United Kingdom

==== Films ====
- Sally (1925 film) based on the musical
- Sally (1929 film) also based on the musical
- Sally (2000 film), an American drama
- Sally (2025 film), an American documentary about astronaut Sally Ride
- Sally!, an American documentary about political activist Sally Miller Gearhart

==== Television ====
- Sally (talk show), a talk show originally called The Sally Jessy Raphael Show
- Sally (1957 TV series), an American situation comedy
- "Sally" (Flight of the Conchords), the pilot episode of the TV series Flight of the Conchords (2007)

== Vehicular ==
- Sally (ship), several ships
- Empire Sally, the Sally, a WW2 Empire Ship, a steam tug of the United Kingdom
- Viking Sally, the Sally, a Viking-line cruise ferry launched in 1980
- Sally, the Allied reporting name for the Imperial Japanese Army's World War II Mitsubishi Ki-21 bomber

== Other uses ==
- Sally (military), an attack by the defenders of a town or fortress under siege against a besieging force
- SALLY (microprocessor), a customised 6502 CPU chip used in some Atari computers and games consoles
- Hurricane Sally, a devastating category 2 hurricane that impacted Florida and the central gulf coast
- The portion of a bell rope used in change ringing which has a covering; see Change ringing

== See also ==
- List of storms named Sally
- "Sally Ann" as The Salvation Army, a Protestant Christian church
- Aunt Sally (disambiguation)
- Salley (disambiguation)
- Sallie (disambiguation)
- Sallee
