= Salley =

Salley can refer to:

== People ==
- John Salley, basketball player
- Nate Salley, American football player
- Jonas Salley, football (soccer) player

== Places ==
- Salley, South Carolina

== See also ==
- Sally (disambiguation)
- Sallie
- Sallee
