= Sallee =

Sallee or Sallée is a French surname, a variation of sallé (salted or salty). Notable people with the surname include:

- Brady Sallee, American women's college basketball coach
- Charles L. Sallée Jr (1913–2006), African-American artist from Cleveland, Ohio
- LaVonne Salleé (born 1946), American artist
- Mary Lou Sallee (1930–2018), American Republican politician
- Matt Sallee (born 1994), American singer
- Ralph W. Sallee (1927–2022), American meteorologist
- Slim Sallee (1885–1950), American baseball pitcher

== See also ==
- Salle (disambiguation)
- Sally (disambiguation)
- Salley (disambiguation)
- Sallie
