= Benjamin West (astronomer) =

American astronomer (1730–1813)

- Born: March 1730; Rehoboth, Massachusetts
- Died: August 26, 1813 (aged 83); Providence, Rhode Island
- Scientific career
- Fields: Astronomy, Mathematics

Benjamin West (March 1730 – August 26, 1813) was an American astronomer, mathematician, professor, and author of almanacs.

== Life and work ==
Born in Rehoboth, Massachusetts, Benjamin West was largely an autodidact. After a school he started in Providence, Rhode Island about 1753 proved unprofitable, he opened a dry-goods store and added what is thought to have been the first bookstore in Providence. He closed his store and made clothes for soldiers during the American Revolutionary War.

Immediately after the war West opened another school in Providence and then taught at Philadelphia's new Protestant Episcopal Academy from 1787 to 1788. In 1786 he was appointed Professor of Mathematics and Astronomy at Rhode Island College (now known as Brown University), and assumed this position in 1788. He taught mathematics and astronomy at Rhode Island College until 1799.

Upon leaving Rhode Island College West moved to Newport to start a school of navigation in his home. From 1802 until his death in 1813 he was postmaster of Providence.

He was apparently able to read French, as he referred often to a French text on astronomy.

Benjamin West was a member of the Pennsylvania Society for the Abolition of Slavery.

== Achievements in Astronomy and Mathematics ==
On April 10, 1766, Benjamin West wrote John Winthrop, then the president of Cambridge College (now known as Harvard College) about a comet he had observed the night before. His ensuing communications with Winthrop brought him to the attention of other men of science.

As part of a major international scientific effort, West and Joseph Brown observed the transit of Venus on June 3, 1769, publishing An Account of the Observation of Venus upon the Sun the Third Day of June 1769. The observation was conducted from a platform on the east side of Providence. The street has since been named Transit Street in honor of the event. His work on the transit was so respected that he was made an honorary member of the American Philosophical Society and received an honorary Master of Arts from Cambridge College.

His published observations of the 1769 transits of Venus and Mercury came to the attention of astronomers in both colonial America and England and were brought to the attention of the Royal Society of London.

He observed Lexell's Comet in July 1770 and corresponded again with Winthrop and other astronomers. His observations contributed to the development of the theory regarding the tails of comets.

In the early 1770s, West formulated theorems for the extraction of the roots of odd powers. His theorems were published in the first volume of the transactions of the American Academy of Arts and Sciences in 1781.

West exchanged letters with other learned men about questions of science such as gravity, magnetism, matter, and the physical nature and properties of air. He wrote about his observations of Jupiter's satellites and constructed a new table of them from 1760 to 1810. He also calculated eclipses and other astronomical tables. He reviewed texts on mathematics and astronomy for other authors and sometimes edited them for accuracy.

In addition to his tracts on astronomy and his almanacs, Benjamin West wrote about subjects such as algebra, geometry, fluxions, maxima and minima, and navigation. His papers included tables in which he had calculated the transits of Mercury and Venus, the places of the sun and moon, and eclipses for years beyond his lifetime.

== Almanacs ==
West published a series of almanacs between 1763 and 1793 for New England. His first, titled An Almanack, for the year of our Lord Christ, 1763 was printed by William Goddard on the first printing press in Providence. This almanac was enlarged in 1764 and published annually until 1781.

He published an almanac for Halifax, Nova Scotia from 1766 to 1812, except for a few years during the American Revolution.

== Honors ==
In 1770, West was granted honorary Master of Arts from Cambridge College and Rhode Island College (known since 1804 as Brown University). The honorary Master of Arts degree from Cambridge College coincided with his observations of the transits of Venus and Mercury and Lexell's Comet.

In 1772 he received an honorary degree from Dartmouth College.

In 1781 he was elected a fellow of the American Academy of Arts and Sciences.

While teaching at Rhode Island College in 1792, he was awarded the honorary degree of Doctor of Laws for his distinguished services in the cause of science.

== Personal life ==
Benjamin West was the son of John West, a farmer. His grandfather had emigrated to Massachusetts from Great Britain. When Benjamin was a boy, his family moved to Bristol, Massachusetts, where he received a few months of education from Rev. Mr. Burt. Other than these few months of formal education he was autodidactic. In 1753 he married Elizabeth Smith, a daughter of Benjamin Smith of Bristol. His parents were Baptists but as an adult West attended the Presbyterian Church with his wife. They had eight children, but only one son and three daughters survived at the time of his death.
