= John Brown House (Providence, Rhode Island) =

Historic house in Rhode Island, United States

- U.S. National Register of Historic Places
- U.S. National Historic Landmark
- U.S. National Historic Landmark District – Contributing property
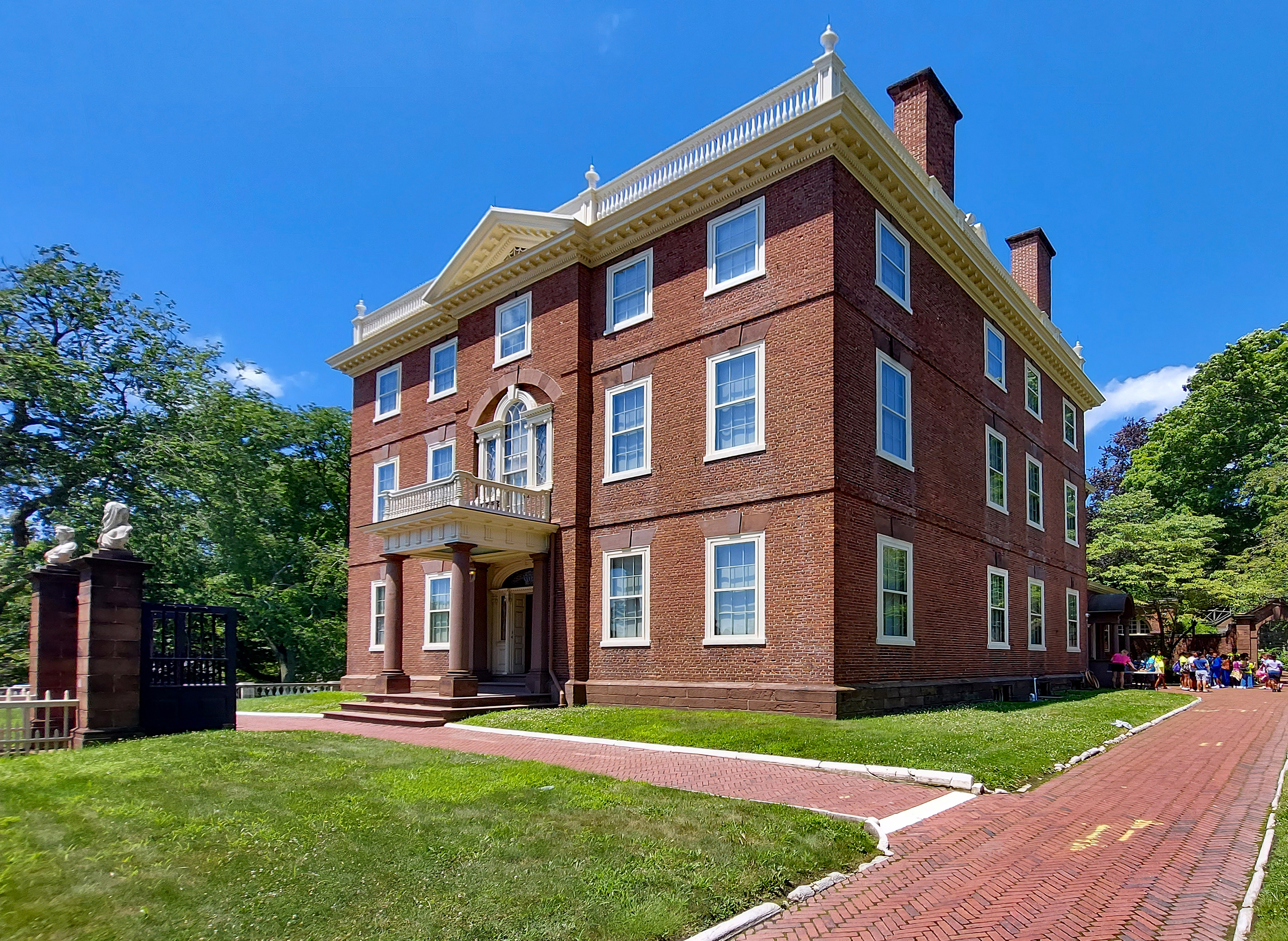
- The building in 2024

- Location within Rhode Island Location within the United States
- Interactive map showing the location of John Brown House
- Location: 52 Power St., Providence, Rhode Island
- Coordinates: 41°49′23″N 71°24′12″W
- Area: 2 acres (0.81 ha)
- Built: 1786-1788
- Architect: Joseph Brown
- Architectural style: late-Georgian (Federal)
- Part of: College Hill Historic District (ID70000019)
- NRHP reference No.: 68000007

Significant dates
- Added to NRHP: November 24, 1968
- Designated NHL: November 24, 1968
- Designated NHLDCP: November 10, 1970

The John Brown House borders the campus of Brown University at 52 Power Street on College Hill in Providence, Rhode Island. Completed in 1788, it was the first mansion to be built in Providence and is named after its first owner, John Brown, a statesman, merchant, slave trader, and early benefactor of the University.

The house was designated a National Historic Landmark in 1968.

The American president John Quincy Adams called it "the most magnificent and elegant private mansion that I have ever seen on this continent."

== History ==
The building was designed by John Brown's brother Joseph, an amateur architect who had also designed the First Baptist Church in America. It was built between 1786 and 1788. Notable guests during this time include George Washington, who is reported to have visited for tea. Brown was an admirer of Washington, modeling this house on Mount Vernon and commissioning a mural of Washington's inauguration in one of the rooms. The carriage house of the Brown House contains a chariot owned by Brown and purportedly used by Washington during a visit to Providence.

The house was sold in 1901 to Rhode Island industrialist and banker Marsden J. Perry. Perry renovated the extension to add modern bathrooms and central heating systems. John Nicholas Brown purchased it in 1936. In 1942, the Brown family donated the house to the Rhode Island Historical Society for preservation, and the society restored it to its original colonial decor. The museum now contains many original furniture pieces provided by the Brown family estate.

== Events ==
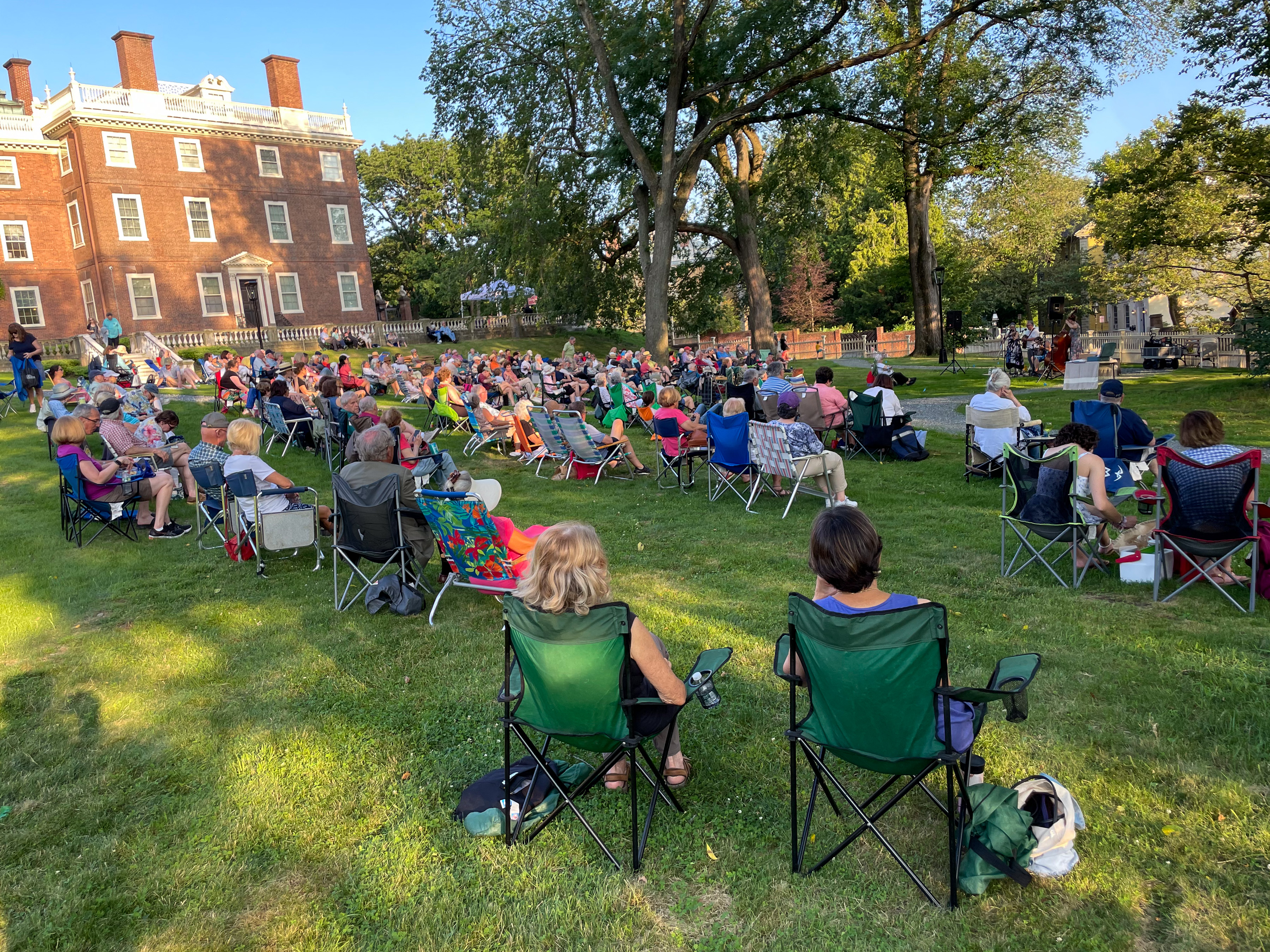
Concert Under the Elms

The lawn of the John Brown House is the setting for the Rhode Island Historical Society's annual summer concert series "Concerts Under the Elms." The concerts feature a variety of mostly local music talent, ranging from Big Band to Latin Jazz to folk, oldies, and more. Local food trucks provide meals.

== Description ==
The house is a three-story brick structure with a hipped roof topped by a flat section. Both the main roof line and the flat section are ringed by a low balustrade. Four chimneys rise from the sides of the house, and its main entrance is in a center projecting section topped by a small triangular pediment. The entry is sheltered by a portico supported by sandstone Doric columns, and there is a Palladian window above the portico. The interior of the house follows a traditional Georgian plan, with a central hallway flanked by two rooms on either side. The hall is particularly grand, with engaged columns supporting architectural busts and a two-stage stairwell with an ornate twisting banister. Richly detailed woodwork is evident in all of the public rooms. Eleven of the building's twelve mantelpieces are original.

== Gallery ==
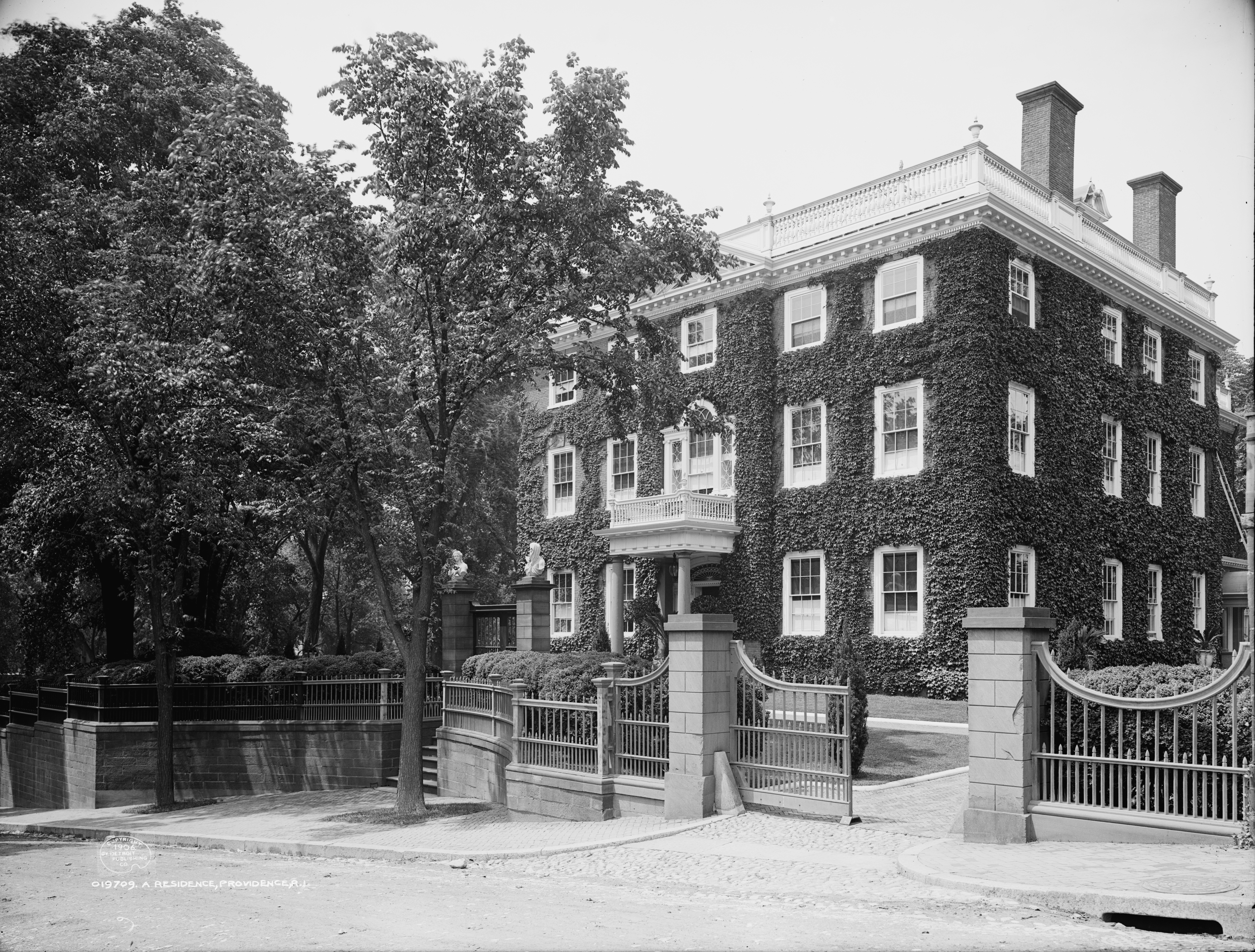
The house photographed in 1906

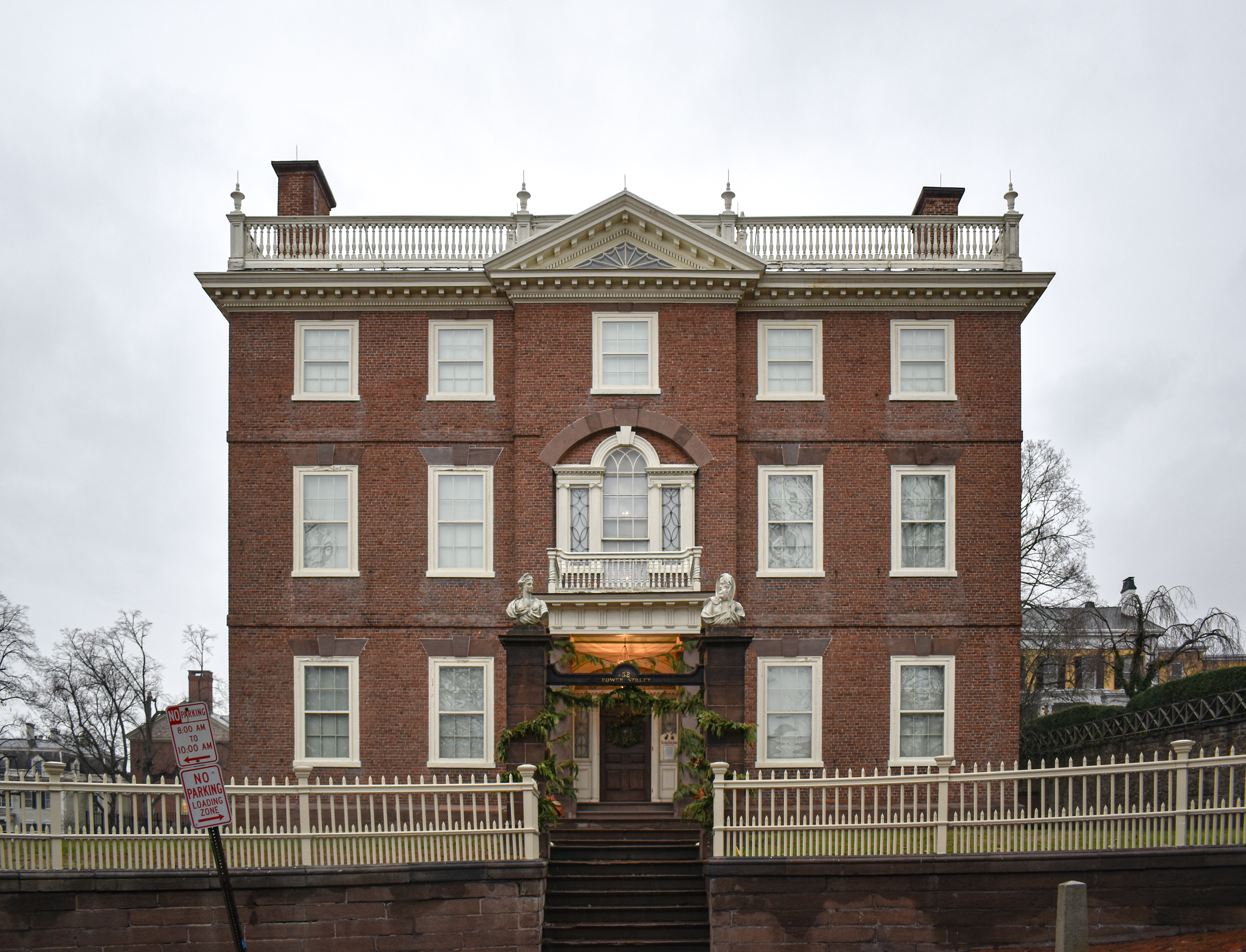
The building's facade in 2020

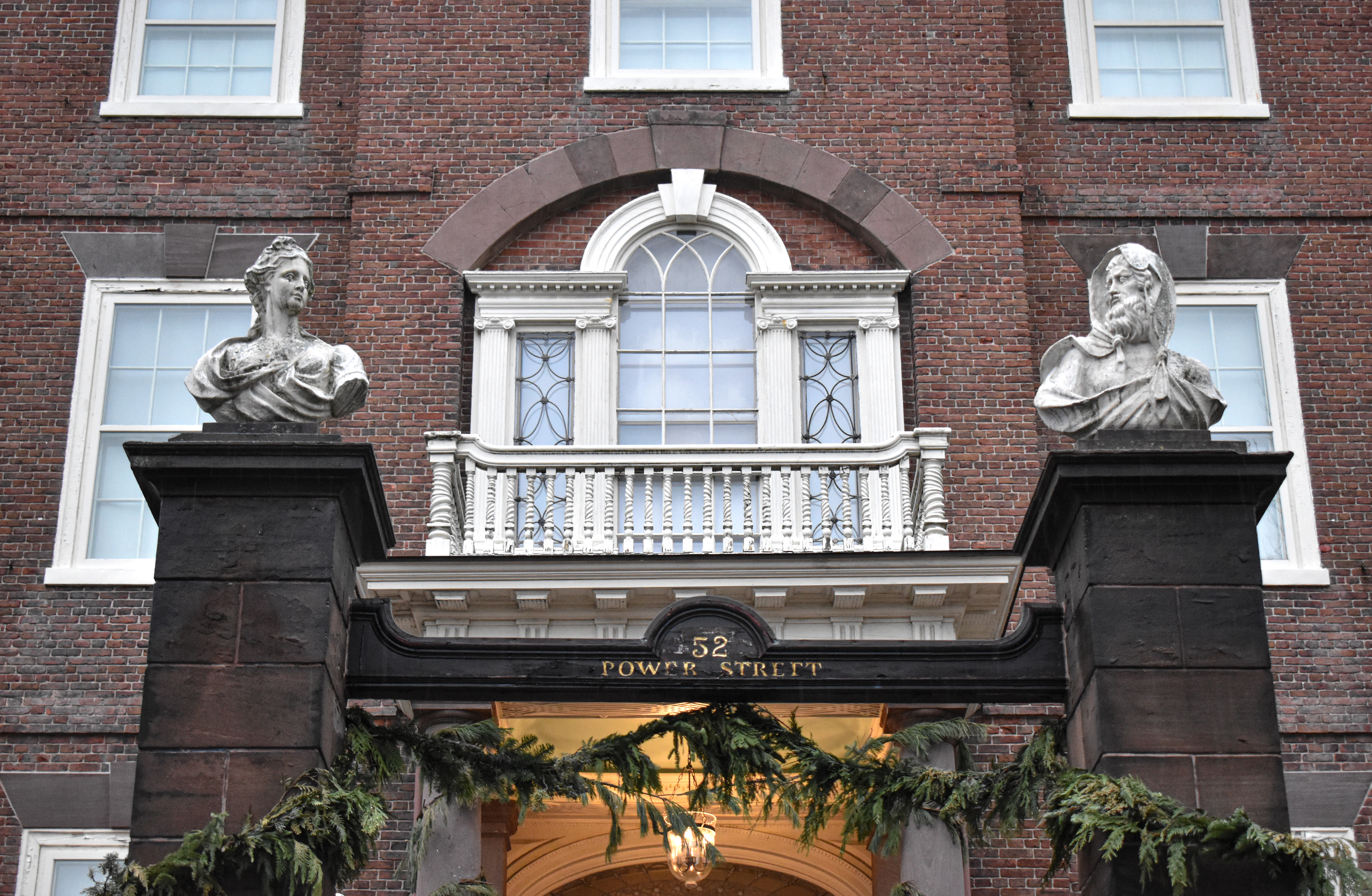
These busts, representing summer and winter, were reportedly taken from Versailles during the French Revolution

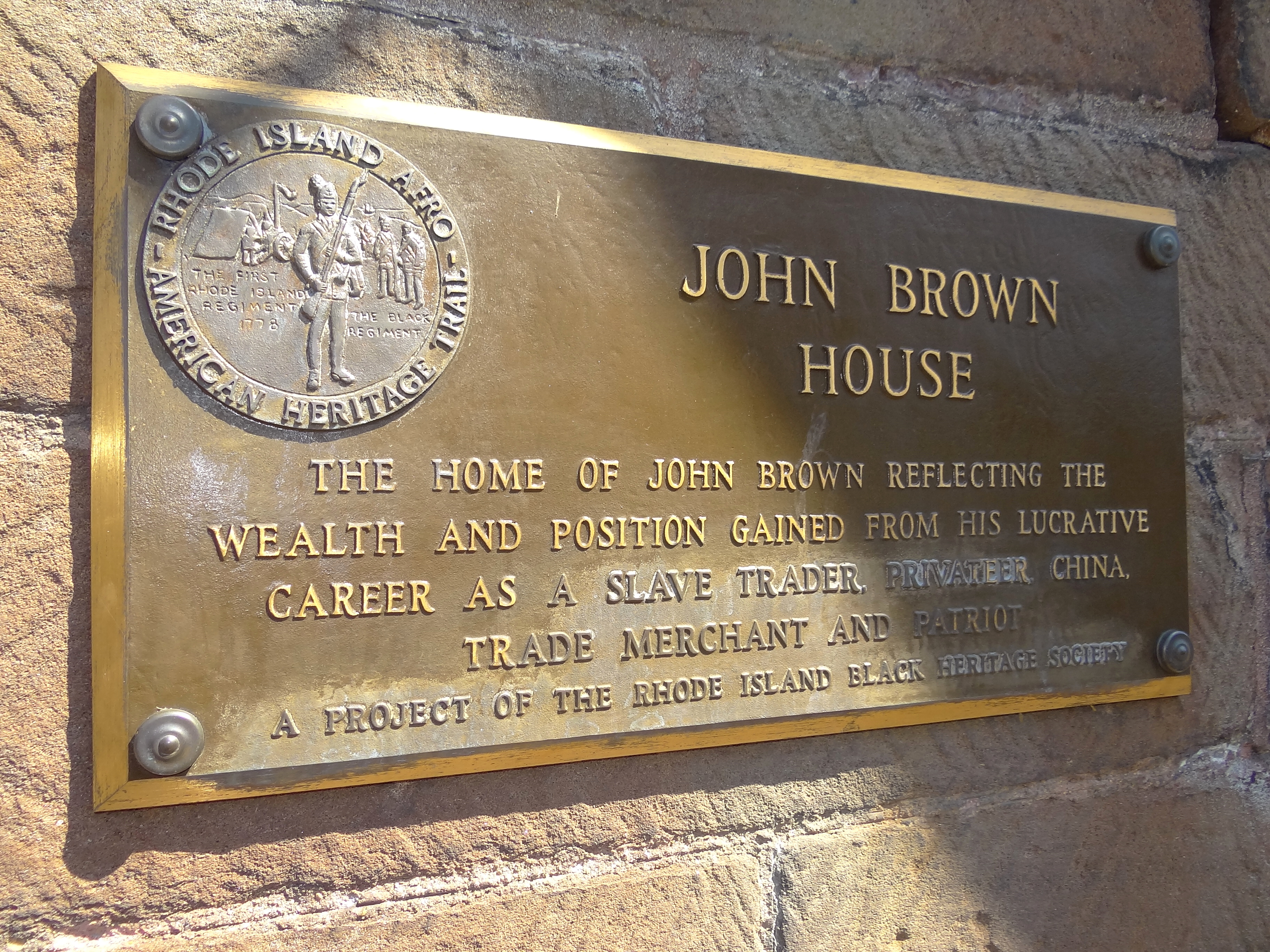
A plaque in front of the building was updated by the Rhode Island Black Heritage Society to reflect John Brown's involvement in the slave trade

== See also ==
- National Register of Historic Places listings in Providence, Rhode Island
- List of National Historic Landmarks in Rhode Island
