= Aunt Sally (disambiguation) =

Aunt Sally is a traditional English game

Aunt Sally may also refer to

- Aunt Sally (film), 1933 film
- Aunt Sally (band), Japanese band
- Aunt Sally, a character from Worzel Gummidge
- Aunt Sal, EastEnders character
- Straw man, logical fallacy
- Please Excuse My Dear Aunt Sally, a mnemonic for memorizing the order of operations in arithmetic

== See also ==
- Sally (disambiguation)
