= Brown Square House =

Historic house in Massachusetts, United States

- U.S. National Register of Historic Places
- U.S. Historic district – Contributing property
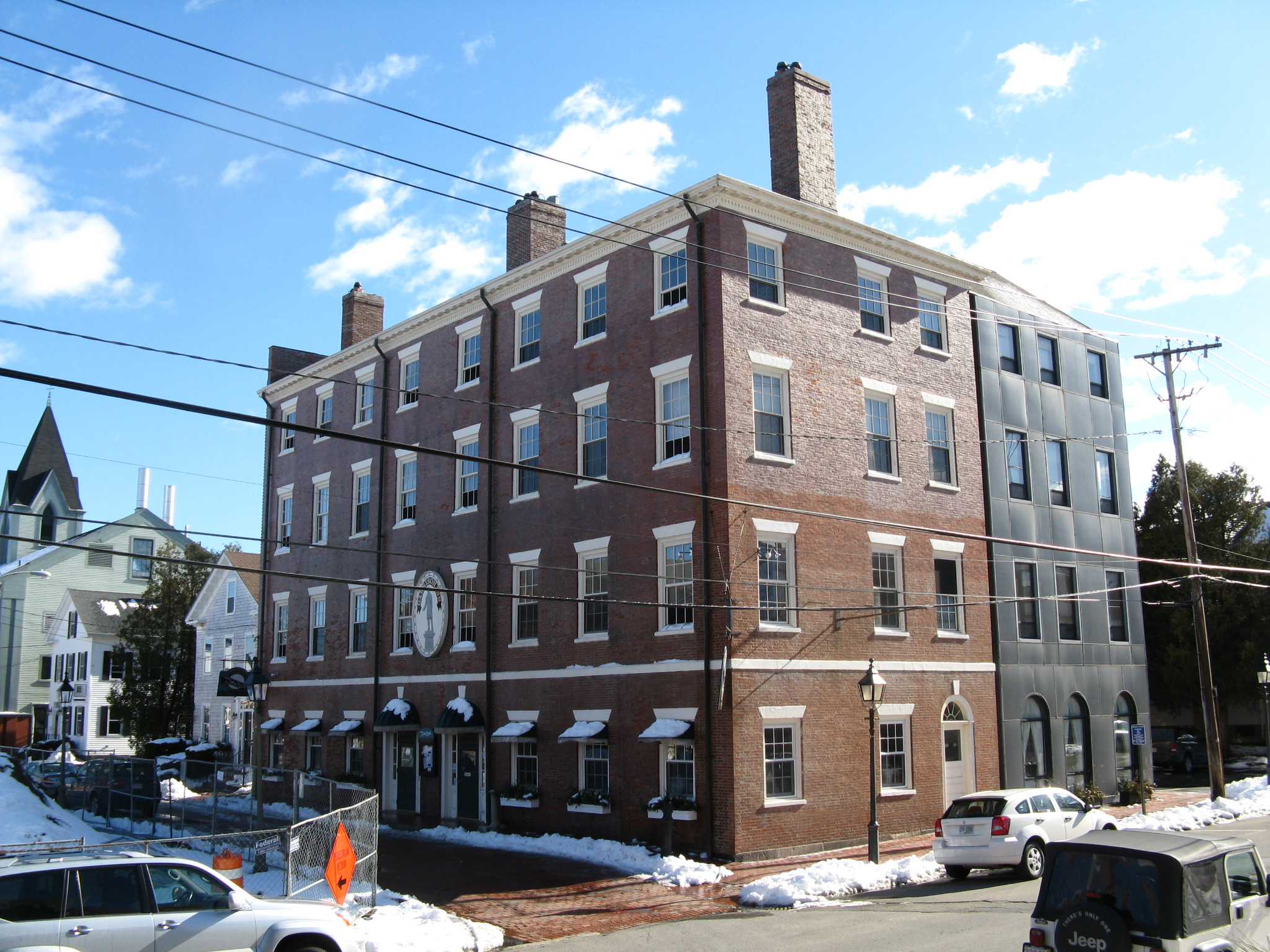
- Brown Square House

- Location within Massachusetts Location within the United States
- Location: 11 Brown Sq., Newburyport, Massachusetts
- Coordinates: 42°48′40″N 70°52′27″W
- Built: 1809
- Architect: Moses Brown
- Architectural style: Federal
- Part of: Newburyport Historic District (ID84002411)
- NRHP reference No.: 75000284

Significant dates
- Added to NRHP: March 7, 1975
- Designated CP: August 2, 1984

The Brown Square House, now the Garrison Inn, is a historic pair of rowhouses at 11 Brown Square in Newburyport, Massachusetts. Built in 1809–10, they form the largest surviving brick building from the Federal period in the city. The building was added to the National Register of Historic Places in 1975, and included in the Newburyport Historic District in 1984.

== Description and history ==
Brown Square is a narrow rectangular park at the northern end of a city block on the west side of Newburyport's downtown, bounded by Titcomb, Pleasant, and Green Streets on the west, north, and south, and by Brown Square on the south. The Brown Square House occupies the western end of the block facing the park to the north. It consists of a pair of similar brick rowhouses, each four stories in height. It is covered by a hip roof with a dentillated cornice. The brick is laid in Flemish bond. Each unit is four bays wide, with the entrances at ground level in the innermost bays, set in arched openings with flanking sidelights and fanlights above. Windows are set in rectangular openings with brownstone sills and splayed lintels.

The two rowhouses were built in 1809 and 1810 by Moses Brown, a Newburyport landowner, shipbuilder, and shipping merchant. Brown, who had given the Brown Square park to the city, had planned to build a much longer row, but suffered financial reverses and was unable to build more than the pair. Sometime before 1849 the building was adapted for use as a boarding house. In 1922 it was turned into a hotel, named in honor of abolitionist William Lloyd Garrison, a statue of whom graces the square. That hotel closed in 1948, but the building has since been rehabilitated and reopened under the same name.

== See also ==
- National Register of Historic Places listings in Essex County, Massachusetts
