= Sally Rocks =

Rocks in the South Shetland Islands, Antarctica

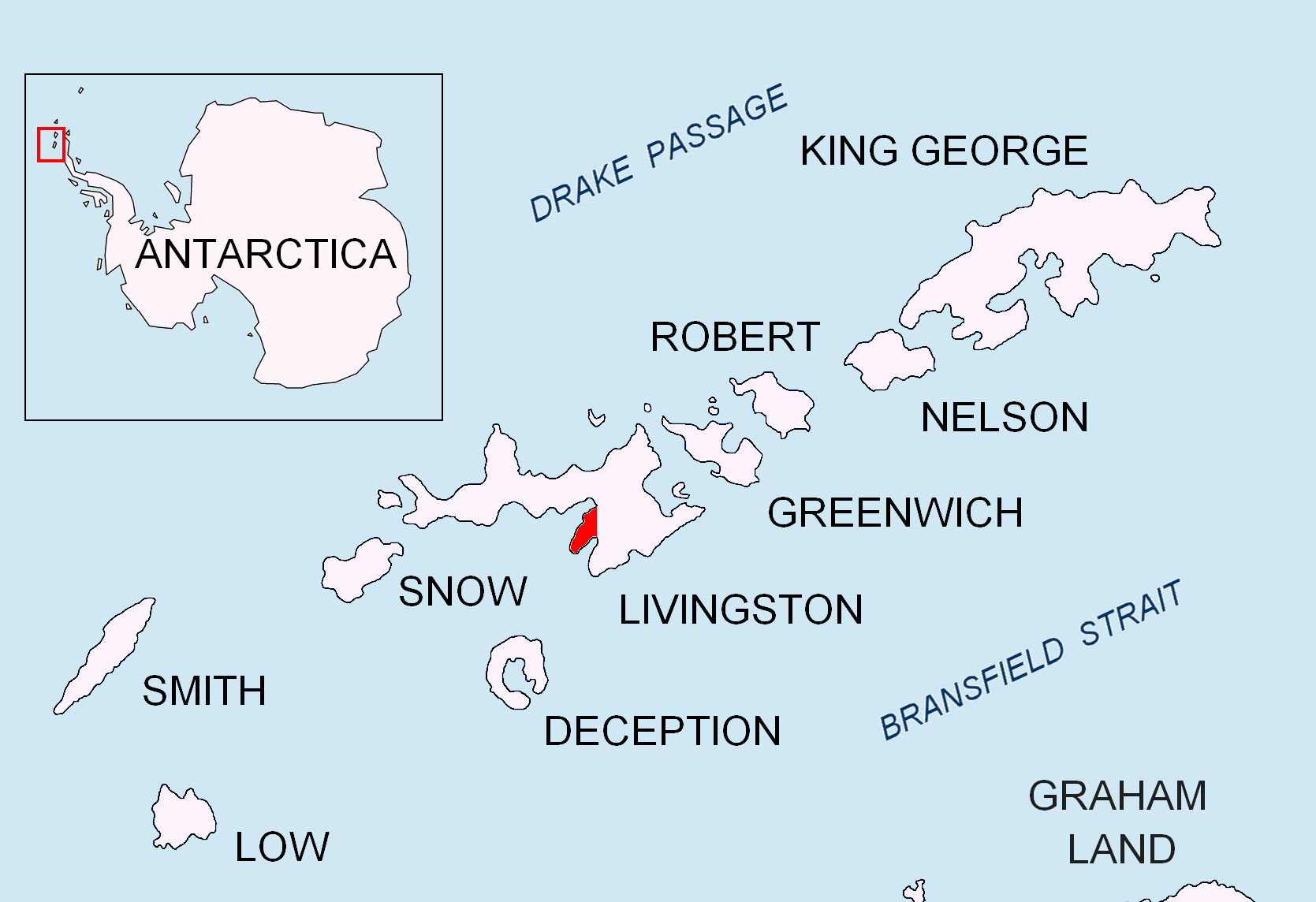
- Location of Hurd Peninsula in the South Shetland Islands

- Location on Antarctic Peninsula Location in Antarctica

Geography
- Location: Antarctica
- Coordinates: 62°42′08.8″S 60°25′45.7″W
- Archipelago: South Shetland Islands

Administration
- Antarctica
- Administered under the Antarctic Treaty System

Demographics
- Population: uninhabited

Sally Rocks is a small group of rocks trending southwestwards in South Bay just off the west coast of Hurd Peninsula, Livingston Island in the South Shetland Islands, Antarctica.

The feature's name derives from the name 'Sallys Cove' applied in 1820-23 by James Weddell to a cove in the vicinity.

== Location ==
The rocks are centred at 62°42′08.8″S 60°25′45.7″W which is 1.78 km (1.11 mi) south of Salisbury Bluff, 2.04 km (1.27 mi) north of Miers Bluff and 10.82 km (6.72 mi) southeast of Hannah Point. British mapping in 1968, detailed Spanish mapping in 1991, and Bulgarian mapping in 2005, 2009 and 2017.

== Sally Rocks Camp ==
The Bulgarian Sally Rocks Camp (62°42′08″S 60°25′07″W) on the Hurd Peninsula beach facing the rocks supported geological research on southern Hurd Peninsula in 2005/06 and subsequent seasons.

Topographic map of Livingston Island and Smith Island

== See also ==
- Composite Antarctic Gazetteer
- List of Antarctic islands south of 60° S
- SCAR
- Territorial claims in Antarctica
- List of Antarctic field camps

== Maps ==
- Isla Livingston: Península Hurd. Mapa topográfico de escala 1:25000. Madrid: Servicio Geográfico del Ejército, 1991. (Map reproduced on p. 16 of the linked work)
- L.L. Ivanov et al., Antarctica: Livingston Island and Greenwich Island, South Shetland Islands (from English Strait to Morton Strait, with illustrations and ice-cover distribution), Scale 1: 100000 map, Antarctic Place-names Commission of Bulgaria, Ministry of Foreign Affairs, Sofia, 2005.
- L.L. Ivanov. Antarctica: Livingston Island and Greenwich, Robert, Snow and Smith Islands. Scale 1:120000 topographic map. Troyan: Manfred Wörner Foundation, 2009.
- Antarctic Digital Database (ADD). Scale 1:250000 topographic map of Antarctica. Scientific Committee on Antarctic Research (SCAR). Since 1993, regularly upgraded and updated.
- L.L. Ivanov. Antarctica: Livingston Island and Smith Island. Scale 1:100000 topographic map. Manfred Wörner Foundation, 2017. ISBN 978-619-90008-3-0
