= Sallie Ellington Middleton =

American wildlife painter (1926–2009)

Sallie Middleton
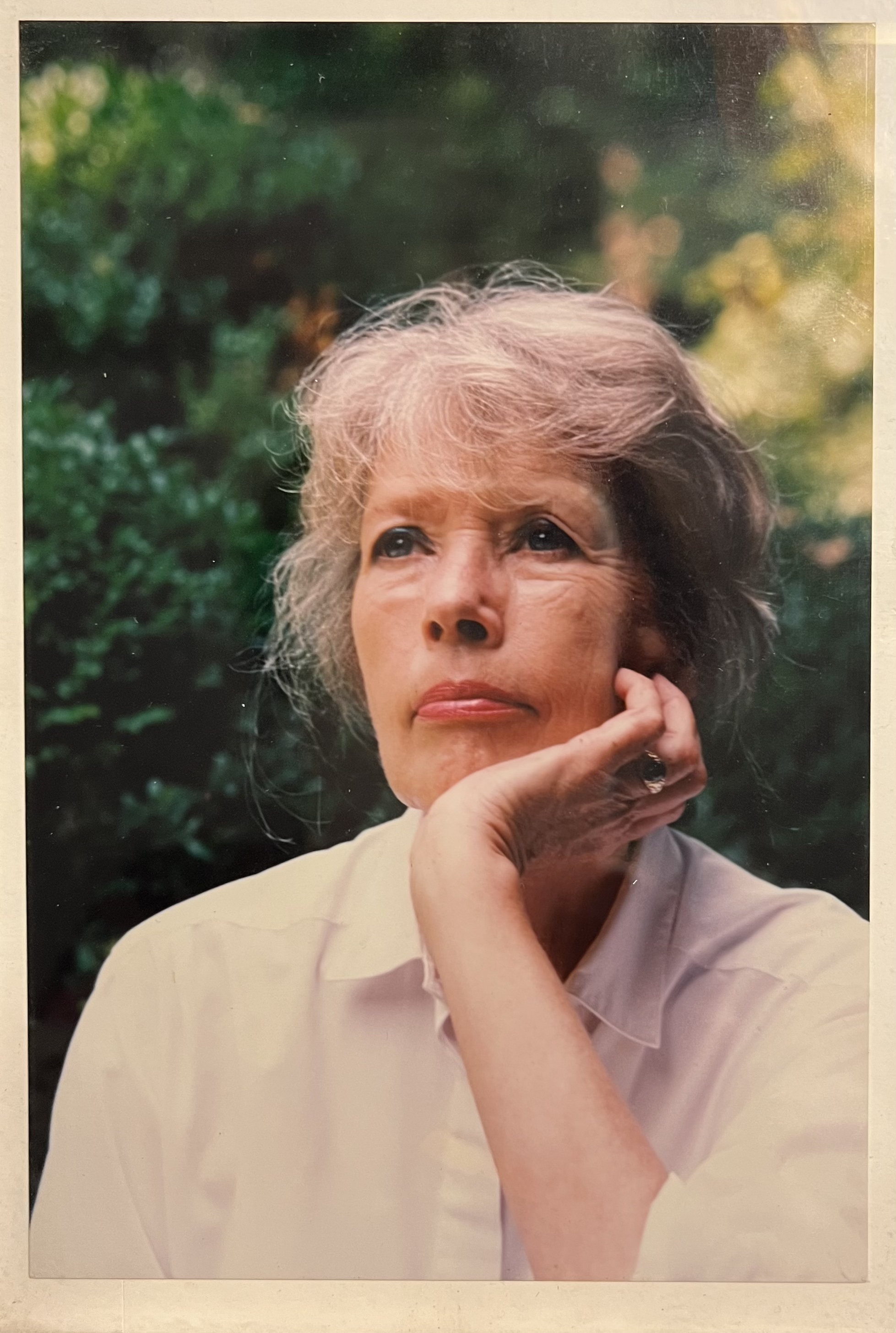

Sallie Ellington Middleton (February 11, 1926 - August 7, 2009) was one of the first female wildlife watercolor artists to achieve national professional status. In the 1970s and 1980s, she was considered one of the most talented wildlife watercolor artists in the country.

== Art ==
Middleton's art is included in private collections across the U.S. such as the Harry Dalton Collection of the Mint Museum in Charlotte, Gibbes Museum of Art in Charleston, Asheville Art Museum in Asheville, North Carolina and at Magnolia Plantation and Gardens in Charleston, S.C. Her work appeared on the North Carolina Wildlife Magazine during the 1970s.

Her work, Owl in the Apple Tree exhibited in “Watercolor, USA” by the Springfield Museum, Springfield, Ohio. Her work was featured in books and also in her biography by author Celestine Sibley, The Magical Realm of Sallie Middleton. Middleton called her watercolor technique brush drawing using a number zero or double zero paint brush to achieve extreme detail. She painted exclusively from living plants and animals and never from photographs.

Apart from art, Middleton was involved in rehabilitating wildlife. As her reputation for this grew, friends and neighbors brought sick and injured animals to her to be rehabilitated and then to be painted.

== Early life ==
Middleton grew up in Douglas Ellington House designed by her uncle architect and watercolorist, Douglas Ellington. She had little formal artistic training but learned to paint from her uncle. She developed her eye for detail during her childhood walks with her father, Kenneth Ellington, who advised her to look closely at the details of the forest to “see the fairies”.

== Publishers ==
Middleton's art was published by among others, Fine Prints Gallery, Fox Fire Fine Prints, Inc., Looking Glass Press, and Sallie Middleton Art, LLC.

== Gallery ==
Sallie Middleton art
