= Joseph Brown (astronomer) =

American astronomer and professor at Brown University

- Born: December 3, 1733; Providence, Rhode Island
- Died: December 3, 1785 (aged 52); Providence, Rhode Island
- Parent(s): James Brown II, Father Hope Power, Mother
- Relatives: Chad Brown, ancestor Nicholas Brown, brother Moses Brown, brother John Brown, brother John Brown Francis, grandnephew

Joseph Brown (December 3, 1733 – December 3, 1785) was an early American industrialist, architect, astronomer, and professor at Brown University.

== Biography ==
Brown was born in Providence, Rhode Island Colony one of the four surviving sons (known in Providence annals as the “Four Brothers”) of James Brown II (1698–1739), a merchant, and Hope Power Brown. Like his father, Joseph Brown engaged in business, and in manufacturing, and acquired sufficient wealth to permit him to follow his natural taste for science. He was greatly interested in the science of electricity, and his knowledge of that subject was remarkable for the time. He left an electric machine of his own construction, an outstanding example of this sort of apparatus for that time.

He devoted considerable study to mechanics and was proficient in astronomy. His attention having been directed to the arrangements in course of preparation for the proper observation of the transit of Venus in 1769, he sent to England for suitable instruments, and subsequently an account of the observations made in Providence was published by Benjamin West, later professor of natural philosophy at College of Rhode Island (now Brown University). Brown was a warm friend of the College of Rhode Island, and was one of its trustees from 1769 until 1785. In 1770 he received the honorary degree of A.M. from the College, and from 1784 until his death held the chair of natural philosophy, giving his services to the institution without compensation. He was elected a Fellow of the American Academy of Arts and Sciences in 1781.

As an architect, Joseph designed and helped to design a number of residential, educational, religious, and commercial buildings.

His desk and bookcase is currently in the Rhode Island Historical Society in Providence, Rhode Island. The desk and bookcase is made in the Chippendale style. The primary, outer wood is mahogany, but cherry and pine are used for its interior.

Joseph Brown was a member of the First Baptist Church in America. He died December 3, 1785, in Providence.

== Family ==
His brothers, all merchants of Rhode Island, were: Nicholas Brown, Sr., John Brown (a co-founder of the College of Rhode Island), and Moses Brown (also a co-founder of the College of Rhode Island). He also had a sister, Mary.

== Architectural works ==
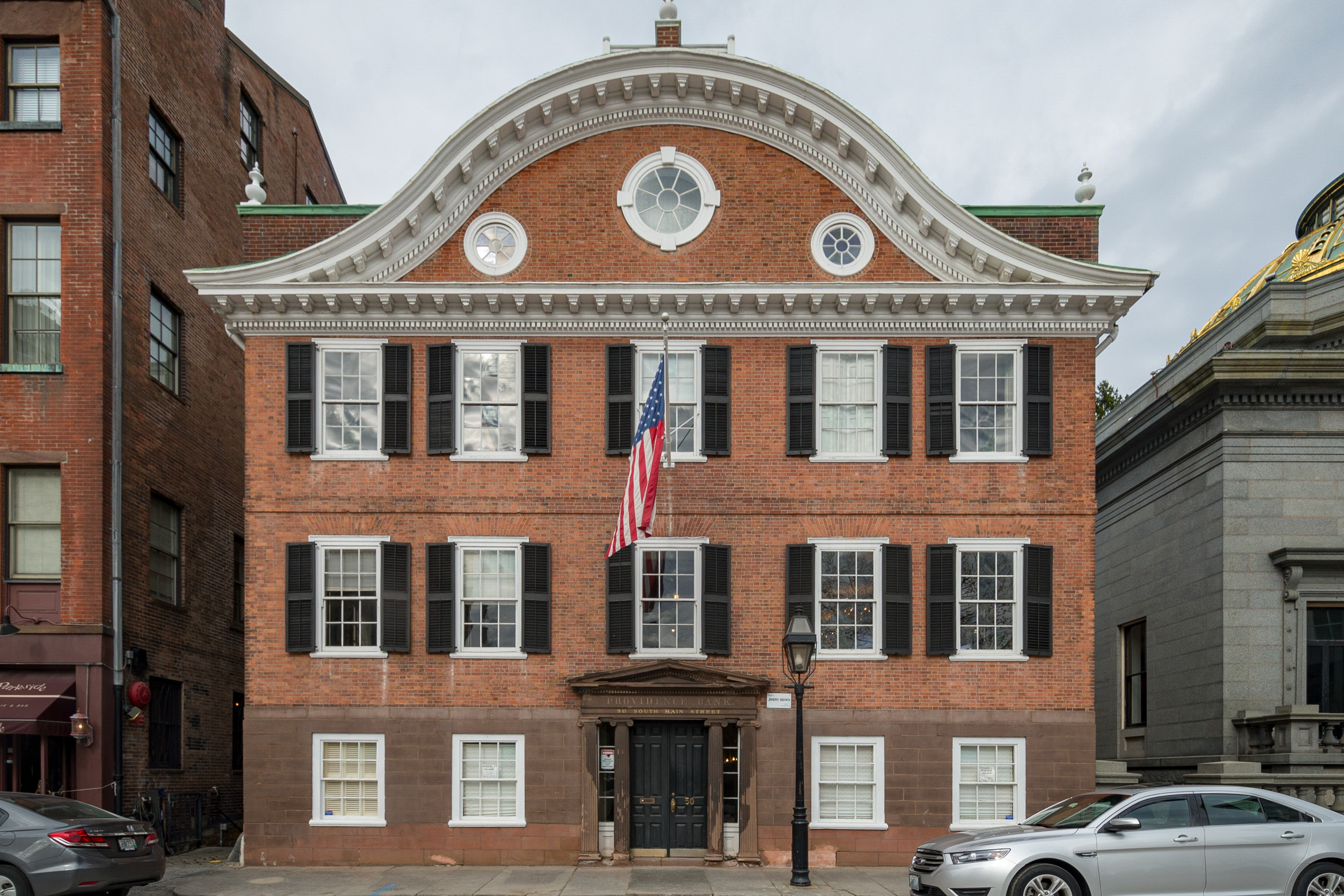
The Joseph Brown House, designed by the architect in 1774, stands at 50 South Main Street

- 1770, University Hall (with Robert Smith), Brown University
- 1773, Market House (with Stephen Hopkins), Market Square
- 1774, Joseph Brown House, 50 South Main Street
- 1774, First Baptist Church in America, 75 North Main Street
- 1786, John Brown House, Providence, 52 Power Street
