= Moses Brown =

American abolitionist & industrialist (1738–1836)

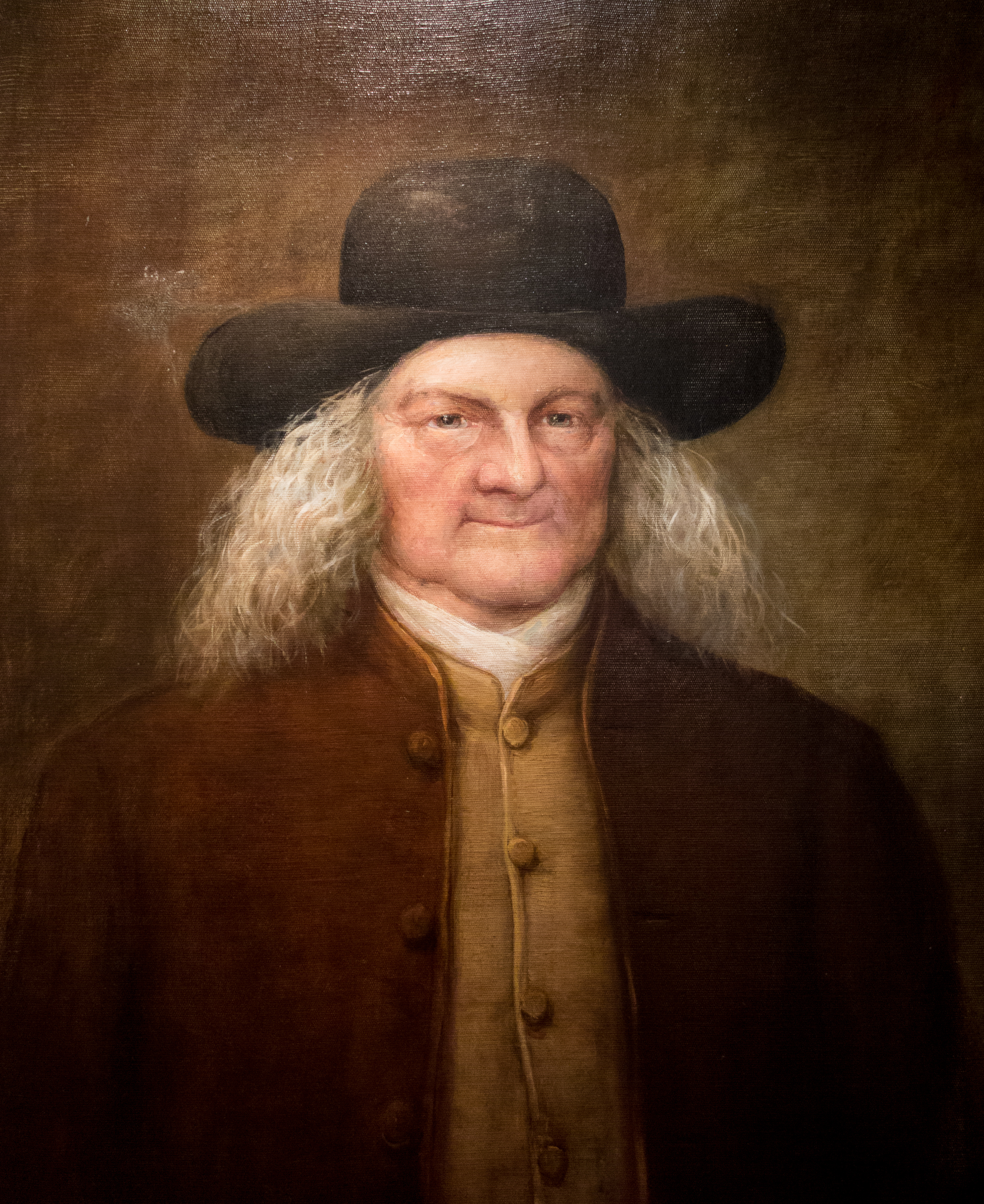
- Born: August 23, 1738; Providence, Rhode Island
- Died: September 6, 1836 (aged 97); Providence, Rhode Island
- Spouse(s): Anna Brown (m. 1764 – d. 1773); Mary Olney (m. 1779 – d. 1798); Phoebe Lockwood (m. 1799 – d. 1808)
- Children: Sarah Brown; Obadiah Brown
- Relatives: Chad Brown, ancestor Nicholas Brown, brother John Brown, brother Joseph Brown, brother John Brown Francis, grandnephew

Moses Brown (September 23, 1738 – September 6, 1836) was an American abolitionist, Quaker, and industrialist from what became known as Rhode Island. With his three brothers, he co-founded what became Brown University. Later, he supported the founding and revival of the Moses Brown School.

As an industrialist, he supported the development, design and construction of some of the first factories for spinning machines during the American industrial revolution. This included the Slater Mill, which was the first modern factory in America. While he was an abolitionist since before the Revolution, the New England textile industry was dependent on cotton produced by slaves in the Deep South. He helped gain anti-slave trade legislation in Rhode Island and later in Congress. Brown was a pacifist during the War of 1812 and appealed to both the U.S. and Great Britain to work towards a peaceful resolution. He played a leading role in founding the Rhode Island Peace Society.

== Early life ==
Brown was born in Providence in the Colony of Rhode Island and Providence Plantations on September 23, 1738, the son of James Brown II and Hope (Power) Brown. He was the grandson of Baptist minister James Brown (1666–1732), and his father was a prosperous merchant.

The family firm was active in distilling rum, owned an iron furnace, and took part in a wide variety of merchant activities, including the slave trade. It sponsored the ill-fated and notorious voyage of the slave ship Sally in 1764, in which at least 109 Africans died.

His father died in 1739, and he was raised in the family of his uncle Obadiah Brown, who was primarily responsible for running the firm's spermaceti works derived from whaling. After Obadiah died in 1762, Moses served as executor of his estate. Shares in the farming and shipping business were divided among Moses and his brothers Nicholas, Joseph, and John. They renamed the business as Nicholas Brown & Co.

The brothers were co-founders of the College in the English Colony of Rhode Island and Providence Plantations, later renamed Brown University after Nicholas's son. The family was active in the Baptist community of Providence and were descendants of Chad Brown, a Baptist minister who co-founded Providence Plantations with Roger Williams.

Brown married his cousin Anna Brown (daughter of his uncle Obadiah) in 1764. They had two surviving children: Sarah (1764–1794, married William Almy) and Obadiah (1771–1822), and a daughter who died young. Brown served as a deputy to the Rhode Island General Assembly from 1764 to 1771, and he served on a committee to oppose the Stamp Act in 1765. In 1769, he participated in efforts to move the college in the English Colony of Rhode Island and Providence Plantations to Providence from Warren, Rhode Island. The four Brown brothers donated family land for the campus that had been passed down from Chad Brown.

Brown's wife Anna died in 1773. He gradually retired from the family business and began his involvement with the Quakers. In 1779, Brown married his second wife, Mary Olney, a fellow Quaker. They were married for 18 years and had no children.

== American Revolution ==
His brother John was arrested in the Gaspee affair, which helped to trigger the American Revolutionary War. Moses and Joseph delivered a proposal to English colonial officials in Boston that Rhode Island's preparations to resist royal authority would be stopped if John was released.

== Later life ==
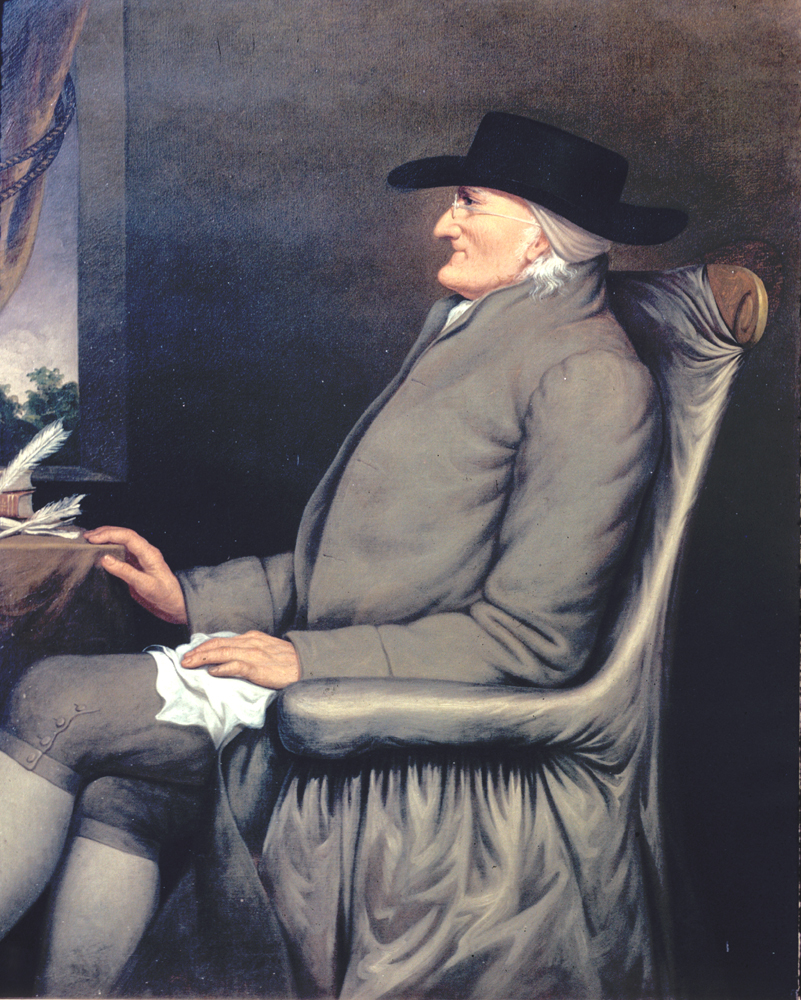
Moses Brown in later life; portrait by Martin Johnson Heade

In 1788, Brown returned briefly to the business world, embarking on a textile venture in partnership with his cousin Smith Brown and his future son-in-law William Almy. Brown became interested in recent British attempts to use water power in their textile mills. He hired English immigrant Samuel Slater to help build a similar mill in Pawtucket, Rhode Island. In 1793, the factory became the first water-powered spinning mill in the United States, a seminal event that is generally considered the birth of the American Industrial Revolution. Moses's son Obadiah Brown replaced Smith Brown as a partner, and Slater joined them to create the firm of Almy, Brown & Slater. Brown withdrew from active involvement in the firm but remained a partner.

Brown shifted to a variety of new activities. He played a role in Rhode Island's ratification of the U.S. Constitution in 1790. He also became interested in agricultural experiments on his Providence farm and helped found the Rhode Island Agricultural Society in 1800. He served on the first board of directors of the Providence Bank and was treasurer of the Central Bridge Company. During the yellow fever epidemic of 1797, he was a strong advocate of sanitation practices. He later introduced smallpox vaccination to Rhode Island.

Brown's second wife, Mary, died in 1798. He married widow Phebe (Waterman) Lockwood in 1799. Phebe died in 1809, and Brown remained unmarried for the last 27 years of his life. Brown was a pacifist, and he was inspired by the War of 1812 between the U.S. and Great Britain to work on behalf of peace. He was instrumental in founding the Rhode Island Peace Society in 1818. He promoted the Quaker position that Quakers should resist war taxes.

Brown played an important role in collecting documents relating to colonial Rhode Island, many of them inherited through his family. He collected biographical information about his contemporary and fellow abolitionist Jemima Wilkinson, who was known as the Public Universal Friend. He was a founding member of the Rhode Island Historical Society, served as its chairman, and had most of his papers left to it after his death. Brown was also elected a member of the American Antiquarian Society in 1815.

Brown died from gastroenteritis in Providence on September 6, 1836. He left few family members, having outlived three wives, all three of his children, and three of his four stepchildren.

At his death, his only descendants were his granddaughter Anna (Almy) Jenkins (1790–1849) and her children. He left much of his estate to the children of his stepdaughter Sarah (Lockwood) Harris (1773–1832), and to the Society of Friends. His son Obadiah had married but left no children. Brown is buried in the Quaker section of the North Burial Ground in Providence.

== Abolitionist activity ==
Before the Revolutionary War, Moses broke with his brothers and refused to continue any involvement in the slave trade. He began a long crusade against slavery after becoming a Quaker, and he became Rhode Island's leading opponent of the slave trade. He freed the last of his own slaves in 1773. He solidified his opposition to slavery during the Revolutionary War, in the company of ministers and teachers from the college in Providence, which had closed temporarily because British troops were billeted in its campus.

Brown renewed his efforts against the slave trade after the war ended. He unsuccessfully petitioned the General Assembly for that cause in 1783, wrote frequently in the local press, and helped distribute antislavery pamphlets throughout New England. He was instrumental in the 1787 passage of a law banning the participation of Rhode Islanders in the slave trade. In 1789, he helped found the Providence Society for Abolishing the Slave Trade, with Quaker and non-Quaker associates, to help enforce recently passed anti-slave trade legislation. He helped pass a law in Congress to forbid foreign slave ships from being equipped in American ports.

In contrast, his brother John was one of the state's leading slave traders and the first person prosecuted under the Slave Trade Act of 1794.

== Moses Brown School ==
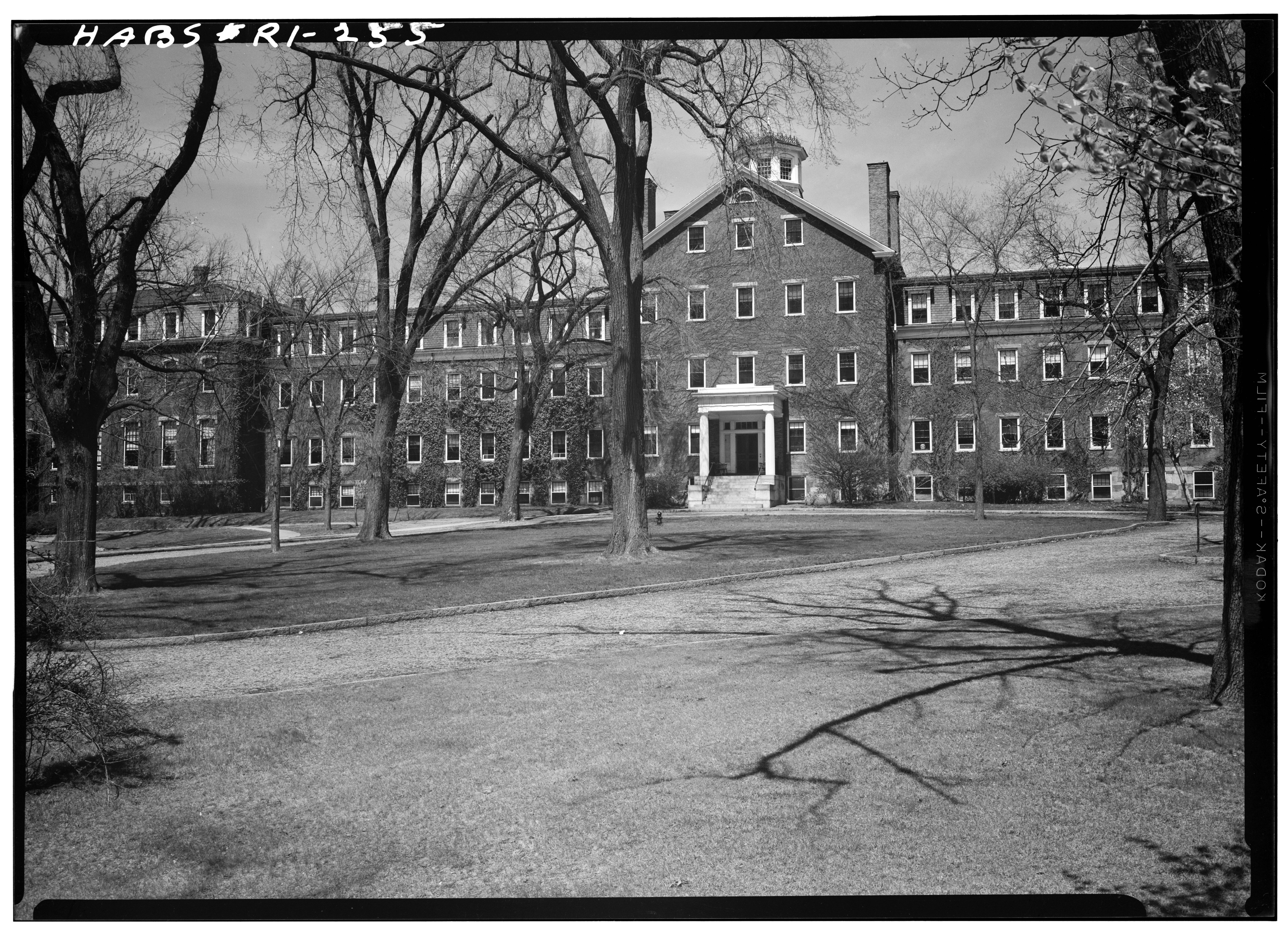
Moses Brown School

Brown played a significant role in the revival of the New England Yearly Meeting School. It had existed intermittently in the 1770s and 1780s but died out through lack of interest. In 1814 Brown presented the Yearly Meeting School with 43 acres of land in Providence and worked diligently toward the creation of a school on this land.

He provided important financial assistance and donated his impressive book collection to the school library. His son Obadiah joined him as a major supporter of this effort until his untimely death in 1822. Moses Brown served as the school's treasurer until shortly before his own death in 1836. The school was renamed in his honor in 1913 and remains a leading preparatory school in the U.S.

== See also ==
- Brown Square
- Brown Square House
