= John Brown (Rhode Island politician) =

American politician, slave trader (1736–1803)

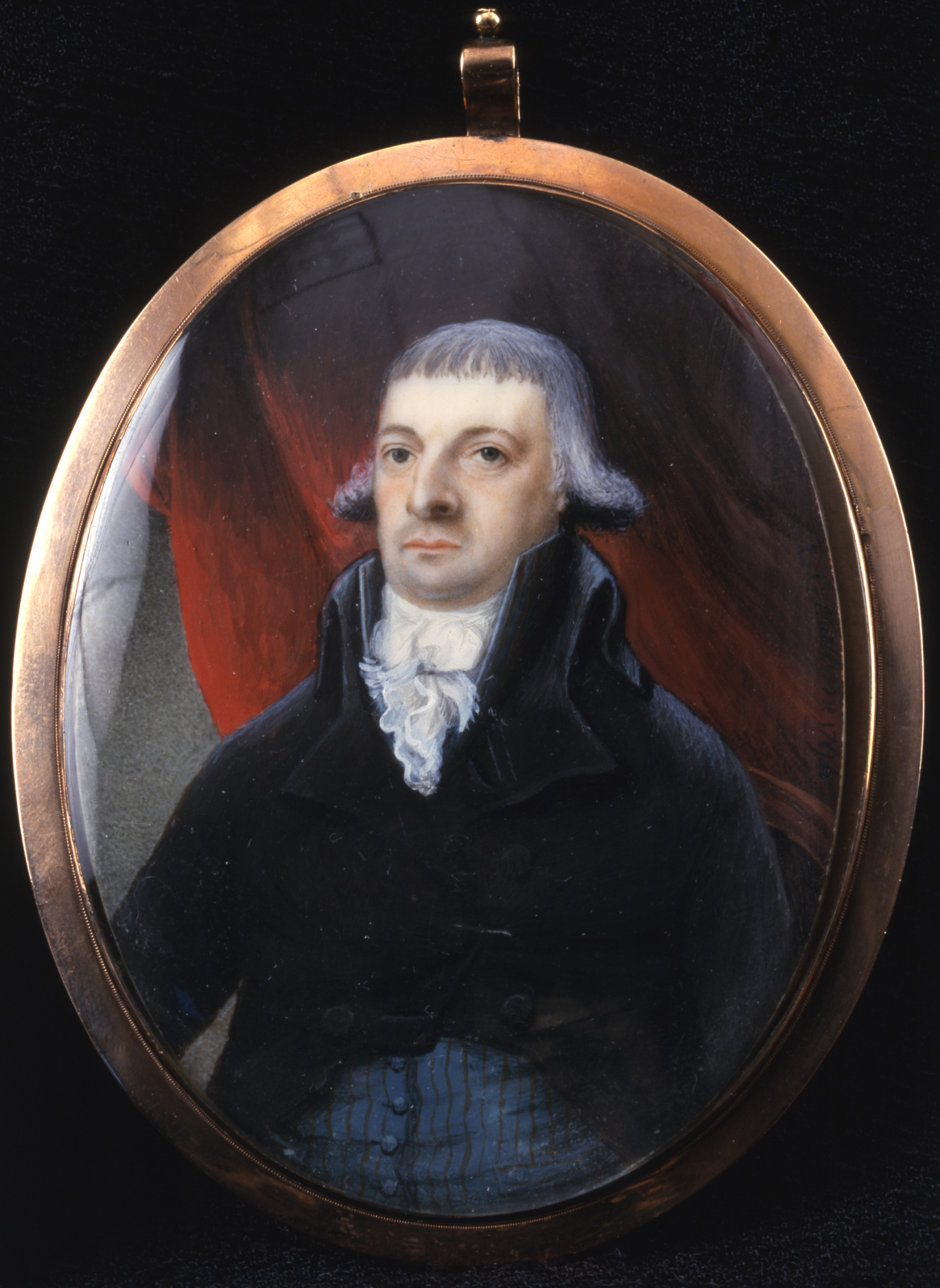
- Miniature of Brown by Edward Malbone

Member of the U.S. House of Representatives from Rhode Island's at-large congressional district
- In office March 4, 1799 – March 4, 1801
- Preceded by: Thomas Tillinghast
- Succeeded by: Joseph Stanton Jr.

Personal details
- Born: January 27, 1736 Providence, Rhode Island, British America
- Died: September 20, 1803 (aged 67) Providence, Rhode Island, United States of America
- Spouse: Sarah Smith
- Children: James Brown III; Abigail Brown Francis; Sarah Brown Herreshoff; Alice Brown Mason
- Parent(s): James Brown II; Hope Power
- Relatives: Chad Brown (ancestor); Nicholas Brown Sr. (brother); Moses Brown (brother); Joseph Brown (brother); John Brown Francis (grandson)
- Occupation: Merchant, politician, slave trader

John Brown (January 27, 1736 – September 20, 1803) was an American merchant, politician and slave trader from Providence, Rhode Island. Together with his brothers Nicholas, Joseph and Moses, Brown was instrumental in founding Brown University (then known as the College in the English Colony of Rhode Island and Providence Plantations) and moving it to their family's former estate in Providence.

Brown laid the cornerstone of the university's oldest building in 1770, and he served as its treasurer for 21 years, from 1775 to 1796. He was also one of the founders of Providence Bank and served as its first president in 1791. Brown was active in the American Revolution, notably as an instigator of the 1772 Gaspee Affair, and he served in both state and national government. At the same time, he was a powerful voice of proslavery thought, clashing aggressively in newspapers, courts and the political system with his brother Moses, who had become an abolitionist.

Brown's home in Providence is now a museum and National Historic Landmark. His personal desk and bookcase reside at the Yale University Art Gallery in New Haven, Connecticut. The desk is attributed to Daniel Spencer, who opened his cabinetmaking studio in Providence, Rhode Island in 1772.

== Early life ==
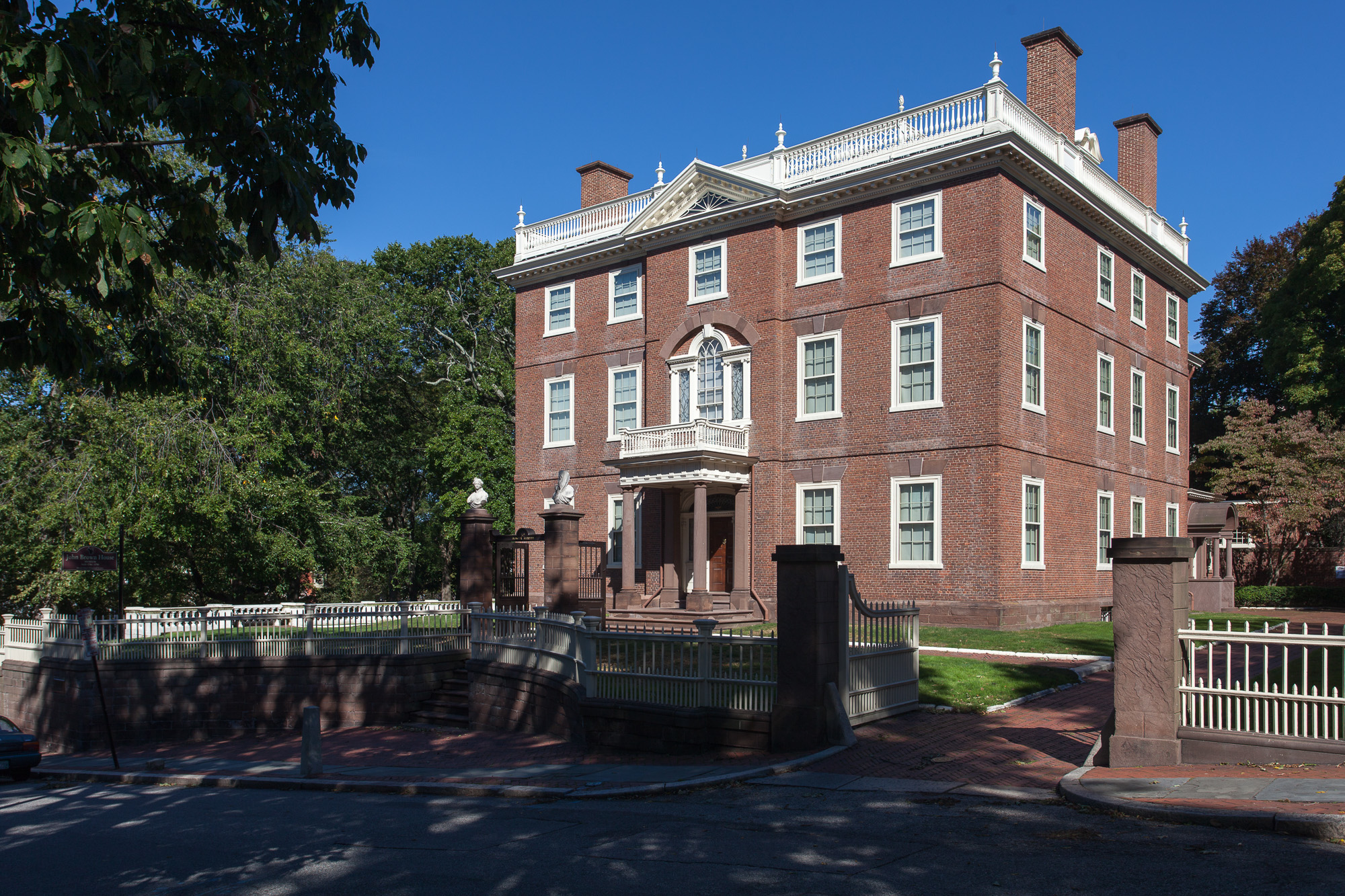
John Brown House in Providence is a National Historic Landmark

John Brown was born in Providence in the Colony of Rhode Island and Providence Plantations, on January 27, 1736, to James Brown II (1698–1739) and Hope Power (1702–1792). His paternal grandparents were Elder James Brown (1666–1716), a pastor at the First Baptist Church, and Mary (Harris) Brown. His father, James Brown II, established himself early in the mercantile business, trading in slaves, rum, molasses, and other goods. His parents, who were married in 1723, had six children, including: Mary (1731–1795), who married Dr. David Vanderlight, James (1724–1750), the eldest son who was a sea captain and who died young, Nicholas (1729–1791), Joseph (1733–1785), John (1736–1803) and Moses (1738–1836).

=== Family ===
John Brown was a descendant of Chad Brown, a co-founder of Providence and early Baptist minister at the First Baptist Church in America following Roger Williams. His uncle was Obadiah Brown I (1712–1762), who joined Brown's father, James Brown II (1698–1739), in the mercantile trade in cocoa, rum, molasses. He also enslaved and sold men, women and children of African descent. Obadiah's initial role was as master of his brother's shipping vessels in the West Indies trade. After the death of Brown's father in 1739, Obadiah retired from the sea himself but continued the business. He also helped to raise James' young children, later forming a partnership with James' four surviving sons as "Obadiah Brown & Co." Obadiah Brown I, who married his first cousin, Mary Harris (1718–1805), daughter of Toleration and Sarah Harris, had eight children. All four of their sons died in early childhood, and their four daughters, Brown's first cousins, were Phebe Brown (born 1738), who married John Fenner (brother of Governor Arthur Fenner), Sarah Brown (1742–1800), who married Lt. Gov. Jabez Bowen (1739–1815), Anna Brown (1744–1773), who married her first cousin, Moses Brown, and Mary Brown (born 1753), who married Thomas Arnold (1751–1826). Another uncle was Rhode Island Deputy Governor Elisha Brown and a nephew was Nicholas Brown Jr., the philanthropist and the namesake of Brown University.

== Career ==
Brown went on to own a successful farming and shipping business with his brothers, Nicholas, Joseph, and Moses Brown. He was active in the slave trade and China trade and invested heavily in privateers during the 1760s through 1780s.

Brown was a leader in the Sons of Liberty and was one of the instigators of the burning of the Gaspee in 1772. Aaron in his affidavit says as the boats got below HMS Gaspee's bows he saw Brown fire a musket and Captain Dudingston immediately falling from where he was stood. Along with the Boston Tea Party, this was one of the first violent acts of defiance to the authority of the British Crown which eventually led up to the American Revolution.

In 1775, during the American Revolution, John Brown sold the United States Navy its first ship, the USS Providence (previously, the Katy). Brown was named as a delegate for Rhode Island to the Continental Congress in 1784–1785 but did not attend.

=== Slave trading ===
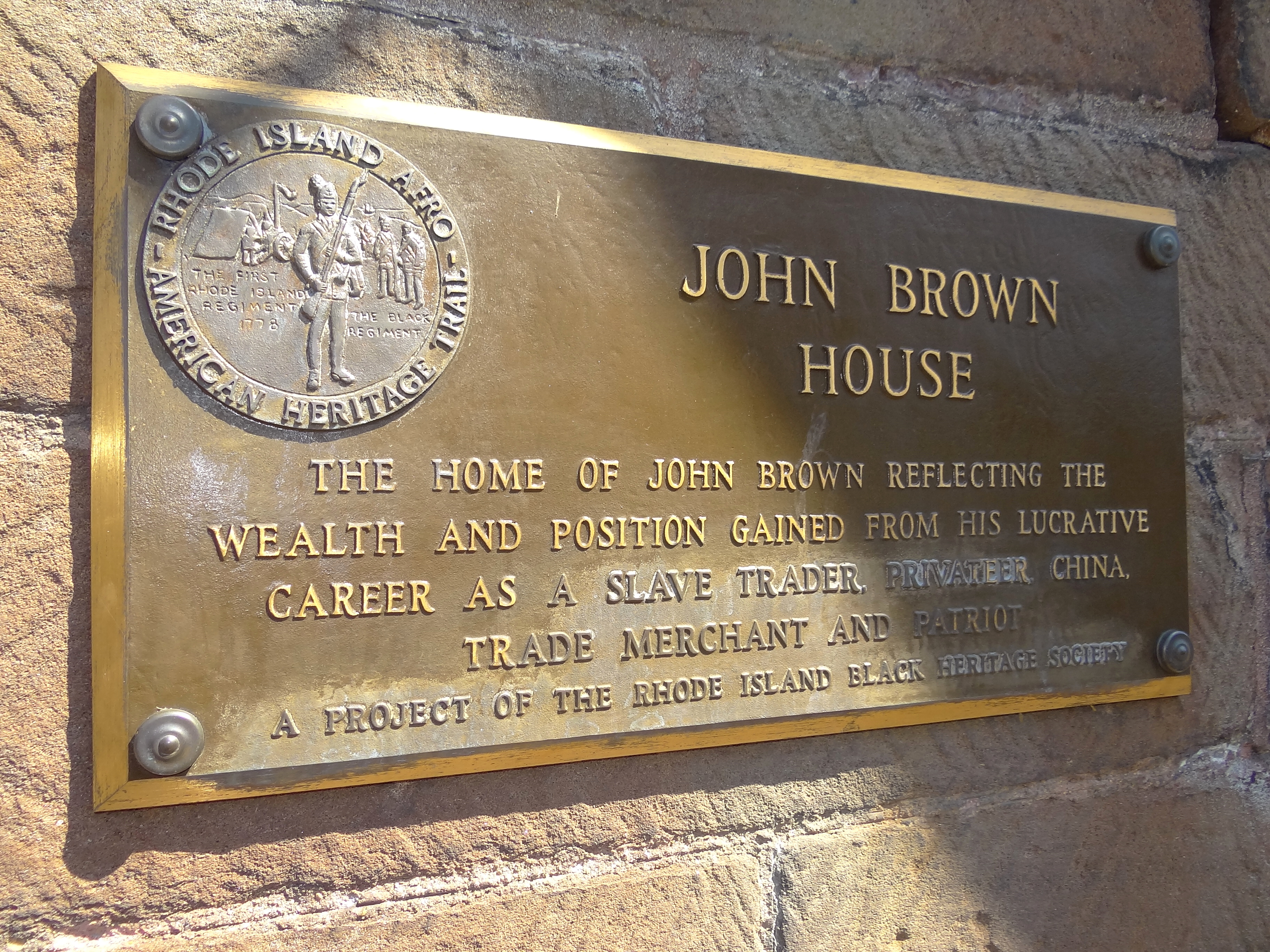
A plaque outside Brown's residence now notes his involvement in the slave trade

John Brown was also a slave trader and personally owned slaves as well. On March 22, 1794, Congress passed the Slave Trade Act of 1794, which prohibited the making, loading, outfitting, equipping, or dispatching of any ship to be used in human trafficking. Subsequently, on August 5, 1797, John Brown was ordered to forfeit his ship Hope. He was tried in federal court as the first American to be tried under the 1794 law. Brown was acquitted but did not have his ship returned.

Brown's involvement in the slave trade and slavery in Rhode Island are addressed in the official Response of Brown University to the Report of the Steering Committee on Slavery and Justice.

=== Business interests ===
Brown's business interests were varied. In addition to the slave trade, he was involved in shipbuilding and real estate speculation. He was also a partner (along with his brother Moses Brown and Rhode Island Governor Stephen Hopkins) in the Hope Furnace (located in Hope Village on the border of towns of Scituate and Coventry, RI) which made cannons during the American Revolution and through the War of 1812.

In 1791 Brown founded Providence Bank – the first bank in Rhode Island, and organizer of the Providence South Bridge Company. After various acquisitions over the next 160 years Providence Bank evolved into FleetBoston Financial which, in turn, was absorbed by Bank of America in 2004. Providence Bank is one of the oldest "branches" in Bank of America's "family tree" and is, at least arguably, still a "living" corporate entity.

The original Providence Bank building (built in 1774) still stands at 50 South Main Street in Providence and is the corporate office of the Brown & Ives Land Company which is another business which can trace its roots to John Brown.

== American Revolution ==
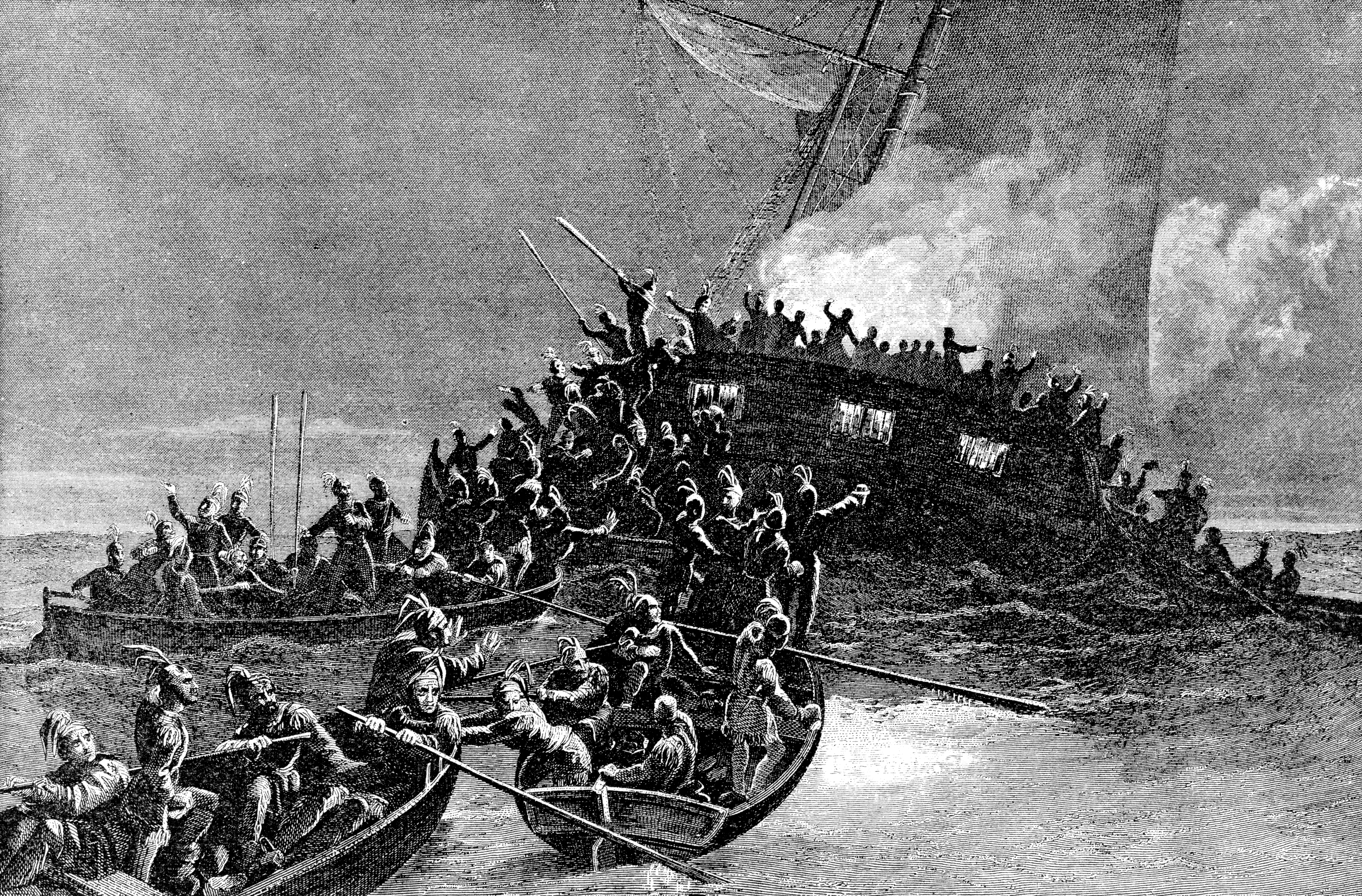
Brown played a leading role in the Gaspée Affair

Brown played a leading role in the Gaspée Affair of 1772 that increased hostilities between the Thirteen Colonies and the Kingdom of Great Britain and helped catalyze events leading up to the American Revolutionary War. He was an active Federalist and pushed against Rhode Island's Anti-Federalist, "Country Party" in getting Rhode Island to become part of federal union.

Providence, the first warship to sail for America's Continental Navy, was built in 1768 by John Brown. It was purchased by the colony of Rhode Island after the Royal Navy began attacking Rhode Island's shipping lanes. The General Assembly ordered its committee of safety to fit out two ships to defend the lanes, one of which became the Providence. The ship, at one time under the command of Continental Navy officer John Paul Jones, went on to participate in 60 engagements and capture 40 British ships before it was dismantled in 1779 to prevent it from falling into British hands.

=== Political activity ===
Brown was elected to the United States House of Representatives in 1798 and served one two-year term from March 4, 1799, to March 3, 1801. The carriage he travelled to Washington in is referred to as "John Brown's chariot" and is preserved at the John Brown House in Providence.

=== Death and burial ===
John Brown died in Providence, Rhode Island on September 20, 1803, and interred in the Brown family plot in the North Burial Ground in Providence.

== Personal life ==
He was married to Sarah (Smith) Brown (1738–1825). Together, they had:

- James Brown III (1761–1834) from Rhode Island, who never married, was educated at Harvard University where he graduated in 1780. In 1789, James was elected a member of the Board of Fellows of Brown University and regularly attended meetings until his death.
- Abigail Brown Francis
- Sarah Brown Herreshoff (1773–1846), who married Charles Frederick Herreshoff (1763–1819), an engineer derived from Germany.
- Alice Brown Mason

=== Descendants ===
Brown's grandson John Brown Francis was later a U.S. Senator and Governor of Rhode Island. His grandson, Charles Frederick Herreshoff (1809–1888), and his sons, James Brown Herreshoff (1834–1930), John Brown Herreshoff (1841–1915), and Nathanael Greene Herreshoff (1848–1938) founded the Herreshoff Manufacturing Company, a boatbuilding establishment in Bristol, Rhode Island.

== See also ==
- John Brown House
- Elkanah Watson

U.S. House of Representatives
Preceded by Thomas Tillinghast	Member of the U.S. House of Representatives from Rhode Island's at-large congressional district 1799–1801	Succeeded by Joseph Stanton Jr.
