= Omega Pond Railroad Bridge =

Historic bridge in Rhode Island, U.S.

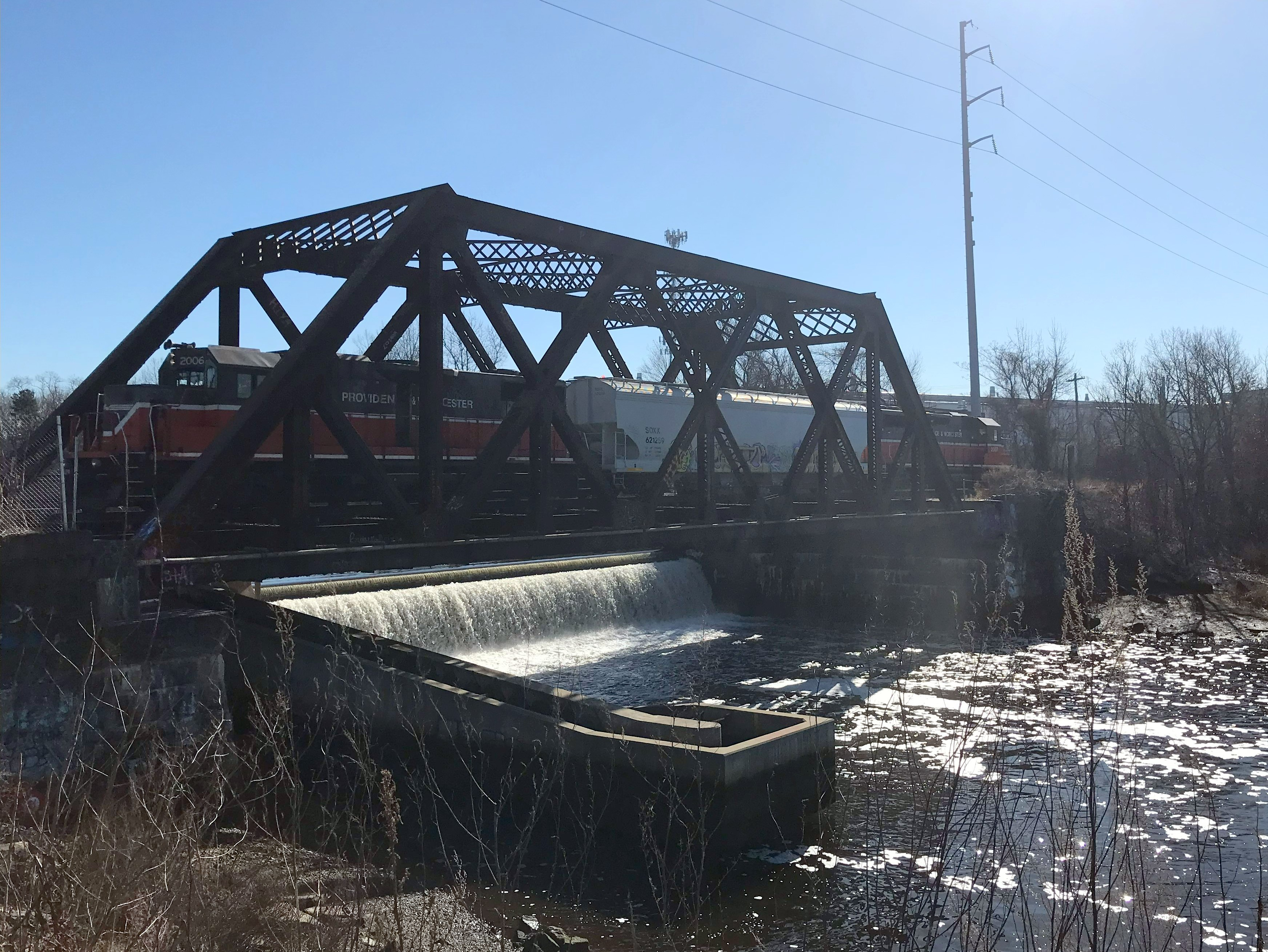
- A train crossing the bridge
- Coordinates: 41.83882°N 71.36881°W
- Carries: Providence and Worcester Railroad
- Crosses: Omega Pond
- Locale: East Providence

Characteristics
- Design: Warren truss
- Total length: 133 feet (41 m)
- Width: 33 feet (10 m)
- Height: 30 feet (9.1 m)

History
- Opened: 1918
- Omega Pond Railroad Bridge
- U.S. Historic district – Contributing property
- Part of: Phillipsdale Historic District (ID11000675)
- Designated CP: September 15, 2011

Location
- Interactive map of Omega Pond Railroad Bridge

The Omega Pond Railroad Bridge is a railroad bridge spanning the western end of Omega Pond in East Providence, Rhode Island. The bridge is a contributing structure to the Phillipsdale Historic District listed on the National Register of Historic Places.

The bridge uses a double-intersection Warren truss design with vertical sub-struts, extending only half the height of the truss panels, that provide additional strength and rigidity. There is a single set of tracks running over the bridge, which was originally built for two tracks, along with a deteriorating wooden walkway. The bridge's masonry abutments are integrated with the adjacent dam, the crest of which is located approximately 16 feet (4.9 m) upstream from the bridge.

The bridge was built in 1918 by the New York, New Haven and Hartford Railroad to replace a covered bridge built in 1874 by the Providence and Worcester Railroad on its East Providence Branch. It is still used for freight service by the modern incarnation of the Providence and Worcester Railroad.

== See also ==
- Boston and Providence Railroad Bridge
- Crook Point Bascule Bridge
- India Point Railroad Bridge
