= East Bay (disambiguation) =

The East Bay is a region of the San Francisco Bay Area in Northern California.

East Bay may also refer to:

== Places ==
=== Antarctica ===
- East Bay (Antarctica), part of Prince Olav Harbor, South Georgia Island

=== Canada ===
- East Bay, Nova Scotia, a small town
- East Bay (Nova Scotia), the east arm of the Bras d'Or Lake
- East Bay (Nunavut), a waterway in the Kivalliq Region

=== United Kingdom ===
- East Bay (Argyll and Bute), a bay in Scotland

=== United States ===
- East Bay (Santa Rosa County, Florida), connected to Pensacola Bay
- East Bay (Bay County, Florida), off St. Andrews Bay in the Panama City area
- East Bay River, Florida
- East Bay Township, Michigan
- East Bay (Michigan), an arm of Grand Traverse Bay
- East Bay (Rhode Island)
- East Bay (Texas), part of Galveston Bay

== Other uses ==
- California State University, East Bay
- Eastbay, a direct mail catalog and Internet apparel company
- East Bay Express, a weekly newspaper based in Oakland, California

== See also ==
- East Bay Ray (born 1958), lead guitarist for the Dead Kennedys
- Eastern Bay, Maryland, an estuary of the Chesapeake Bay
- North Bay (disambiguation)
- South Bay (disambiguation)
- Tung Wan (disambiguation)
- West Bay (disambiguation)
