= East Junction Branch =

Railway line in Rhode Island and Massachusetts

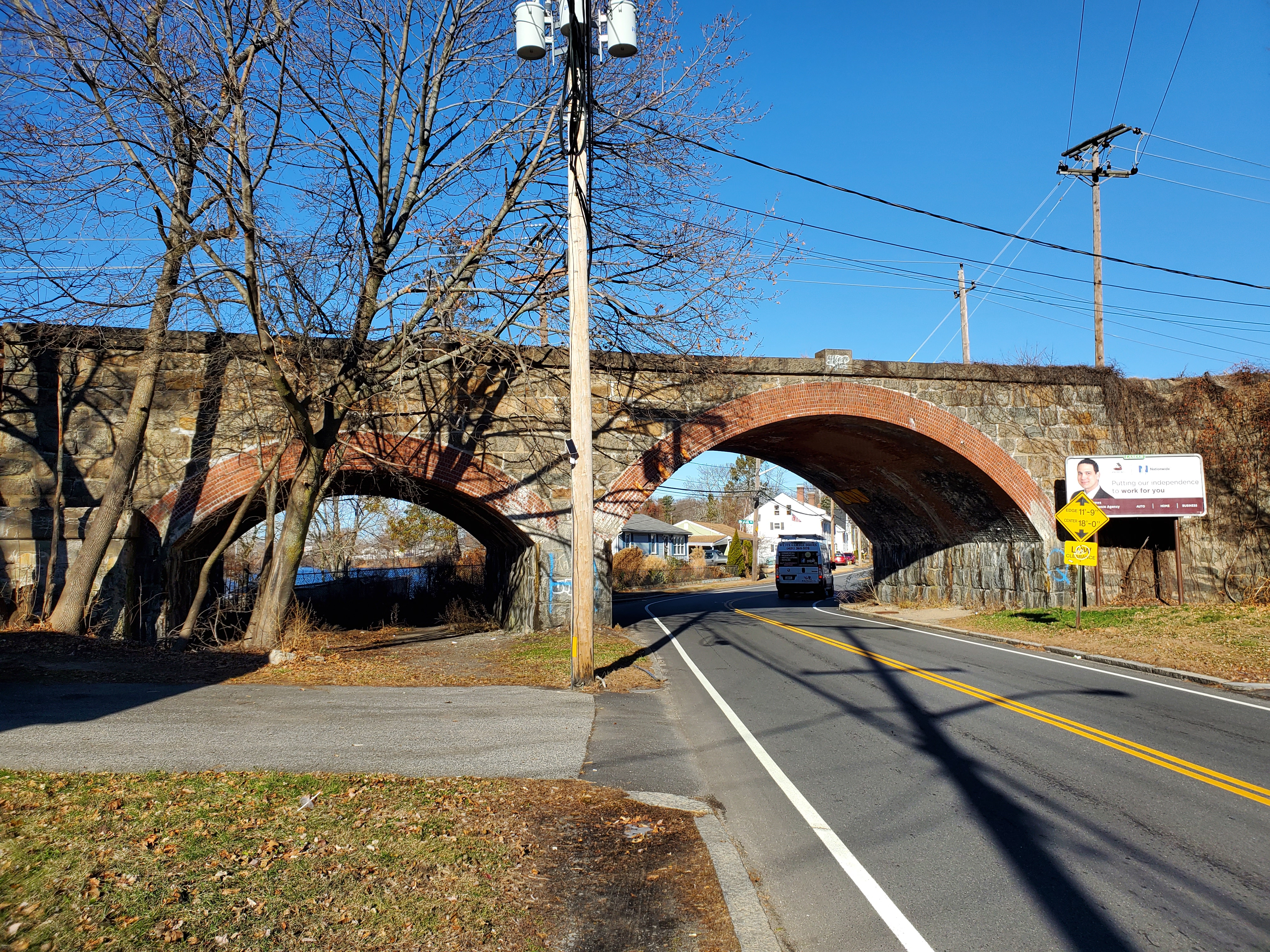
- View of the Boston and Providence Railroad Bridge which carries the East Junction Branch over the Ten Mile River in Rumford, Rhode Island

Overview
- Owner: Massachusetts Bay Transportation Authority, Providence and Worcester Railroad
- Locale: Bristol County and Providence County
- Termini: Attleboro; East Providence
- Connecting lines: East Providence Branch, Northeast Corridor
- Former connections: Providence, Warren and Bristol Railroad

Service
- Operator(s): CSX Transportation (Attleboro); Providence and Worcester Railroad (East Providence and Seekonk)

History
- Opened: 1835

Technical
- Line length: 6.23 mi (10.03 km), line formerly 7.69 mi (12.38 km)
- Track gauge: 4 ft 8 1/2 in (1,435 mm)
Route map
Map of the East Junction Branch

The East Junction Branch (formerly known as the India Point Branch) is a rail line in Rhode Island and Massachusetts, in the United States. Originally built by the Boston and Providence Railroad (B&P) in 1835, the line connects Attleboro, Massachusetts, and East Providence, Rhode Island via Seekonk, Massachusetts. As built, the line continued across the Seekonk River to Providence via the India Point Railroad Bridge; this connection was removed during the 1970s. The East Junction Branch meets the Northeast Corridor in Attleboro at a point known as East Junction, and ends at a connection to the East Providence Branch in East Providence. CSX Transportation operates freight service on the branch in Attleboro, while the Providence and Worcester Railroad (P&W) operates freight service in East Providence and across the state line into Seekonk. The line is owned by the P&W in Rhode Island, and by the Massachusetts Bay Transportation Authority in Massachusetts.

Built as part of the Boston and Providence Railroad mainline between Boston and Providence, the line was downgraded to a branch when a new mainline was built in 1847 west from Attleboro in conjunction with the original incarnation of the Providence and Worcester Railroad. The ill-fated Seekonk Branch Railroad built a short branch off the East Junction Branch within East Providence (then part of Seekonk), which was soon purchased by the B&P and later used as part of the Providence, Warren and Bristol Railroad when that railroad opened in 1855. The P&W completed its East Providence Branch in 1874, which originated in Valley Falls and met the East Junction Branch in East Providence.

The B&P was succeeded by the Old Colony Railroad in 1888, which was itself taken over by the New York, New Haven and Hartford Railroad (the New Haven) in 1893. The Crook Point Bascule Bridge was completed in 1908 along with the East Side Railroad Tunnel, allowing a new route from the East Junction Branch into Providence. Regular passenger service was discontinued by 1914, though special passenger trains serving Narragansett Park were introduced in the 1930s and continued to 1968.

Penn Central Transportation Company absorbed the New Haven in 1969. The India Point Railroad Bridge was decommissioned in 1974, cutting the East Junction Branch back to East Providence, and the Crook Point Bascule Bridge followed in 1976. The bankrupt Penn Central was merged into government-formed Conrail in 1976, and the newly independent P&W was assigned operation of the East Junction Branch within Rhode Island, with Conrail retaining operations in Massachusetts. After CSX Transportation took over from Conrail in 1999, much of the Massachusetts portion was placed out of service in 2001; P&W reactivated some of this trackage in Seekonk to serve a new customer in 2007. An additional half of a mile (0.8 km) of the branch within East Providence was abandoned in 2006.

== History ==
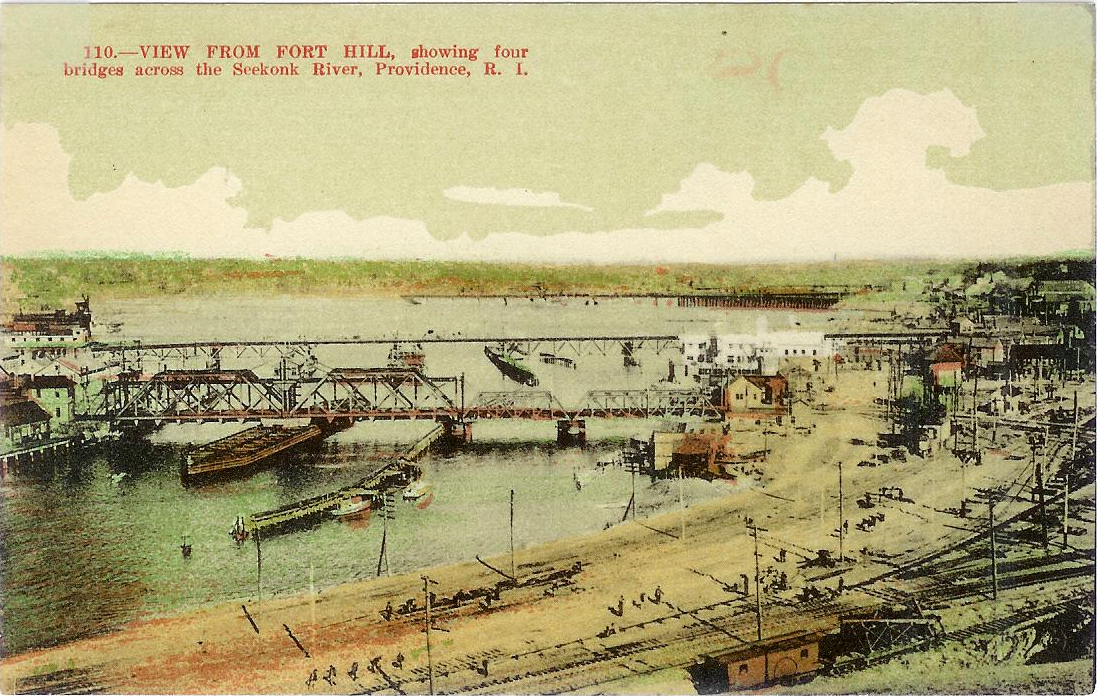
View of former railroad bridges that spanned the Seekonk River, the East Junction Branch formerly terminated at India Point on the western bank of the river

The East Junction Branch is part of the original main line of the Boston and Providence Railroad (B&P), opened in 1835. To reach Providence from Boston, the B&P chose a largely straight route that avoided curves; it was a straight shot southwest from Mansfield, Massachusetts to what was then part of Seekonk, Massachusetts, (later transferred to Rhode Island as East Providence). (Note: The east bank of the Seekonk River (including East Providence, Pawtucket, and Bristol) was returned to Rhode Island in 1862, as part of a land swap which saw Fall River return to Massachusetts. This placed the new state border between Pawtucket and the portion of Seekonk retained by Massachusetts.) Seekonk was just across the Seekonk River from Providence, and a ferry initially made the final leg of the trip into the city until a wooden drawbridge, the first of several incarnations of the India Point Railroad Bridge, was completed and allowed trains to enter India Point. The B&P was joined in Providence by the New York, Providence and Boston Railroad in 1837, but the two lines did not directly meet. Ferries ran from India Point to the South Side of Providence to allow passengers to transfer trains.

Once the railroad bridge was completed, the B&P found itself in conflict with another company: the Seekonk Branch Railroad, chartered in 1836 to build a railroad between the B&P in Seekonk and a wharf on the Seekonk River. The Seekonk Branch Railroad intended to use the B&P bridge to run its own trains into Providence, treating the route much like a toll road. However, the B&P objected to this for safety reasons, and upon litigation the Massachusetts General Court refused to permit the practice, requiring Seekonk Branch Railroad trains be hauled by Boston and Providence Railroad locomotives into Providence. In 1839, the Boston and Providence Railroad absorbed the Seekonk Branch Railroad.

Providence's third railroad, the Providence and Worcester Railroad, opened between its namesake cities in 1847. The P&W and B&P collaborated on a new joint line out of Providence which split in Central Falls, Rhode Island; the B&P built a new mainline from that point to its original main line in Attleboro. The new route became the primary line out of Boston, while the original route into Providence was retained as a branch line, named the East Junction Branch for the point where the new route split from the old one. Made largely redundant by the new route into Providence, most passenger service was dropped at this time apart from trains meeting steamboats at India Point.

The Providence, Warren and Bristol Railroad was completed in 1855, connecting to the East Junction Branch in Seekonk (today East Providence). The bridge across the Seekonk River was initially used by the PW&B to reach Providence via trackage rights. Per the PW&B charter, the railroad also had the right to connect with Boston and Providence Railroad passenger trains in Seekonk to provide service to Boston, but this was not taken advantage of.

Upon its completion in 1874, the P&W's East Providence Branch connected with the East Junction Branch in East Providence, then followed the PW&B right of way to Bold Point. Passenger train service resumed on the East Junction Branch circa 1880.

=== Operations under Old Colony and New Haven ===
The B&P was leased by the Old Colony Railroad in 1888 and the line was labeled as the India Point Branch. The New York, New Haven and Hartford Railroad leased the Old Colony in 1893.

By 1903, passenger service was provided by a single combination baggage/passenger car pulled by a steam locomotive, which ran two round trips daily between East Providence and East Junction. The only regular stop was at Rumford, while a flag stop was also maintained at Perrin's. Passenger numbers averaged in the single digits per trip, and sometimes the train ran with no passengers at all; tickets could not be purchased in Providence and the Providence Journal attested that most local residents were unaware the passenger train was available. This train continued running to fulfil the New Haven's requirement to provide passenger service on the line, which held far more value as a route for freight trains.

The electrification of the Providence, Warren & Bristol in 1900 increased the feasibility of a mile-long (1.6 km) tunnel under College Hill to provide a way of getting trains from the east bay to Union Station in the center of Providence and an alternate route to Boston. The Crook Point Bascule Bridge along with the East Side Tunnel and a downtown viaduct were put into service on November 15, 1908, adding a new connection between the East Junction Branch and downtown Providence.

The New Haven sought to double-track the branch between East Providence and East Junction, and approval for this work along with the elimination of several grade crossings came in October 1912. This was intended to allow for a continuous double-tracked route from East Junction to the Crook Point Bridge. This work was budgeted at $405,000 in 1910. As part of the construction, Rumford station was to be moved approximately 500 feet (150 m) east. Pawtucket Avenue (Rhode Island Route 114 / U.S. Route 1A) was to be grade-separated with a new bridge. Double tracking was completed by November 1913.

Regular passenger service was discontinued by 1914. While regular passenger service never returned to the branch, dedicated passenger trains connecting to Narragansett Park were introduced by 1937 and continued until the end of the New Haven Railroad in 1968.

=== After the New Haven ===
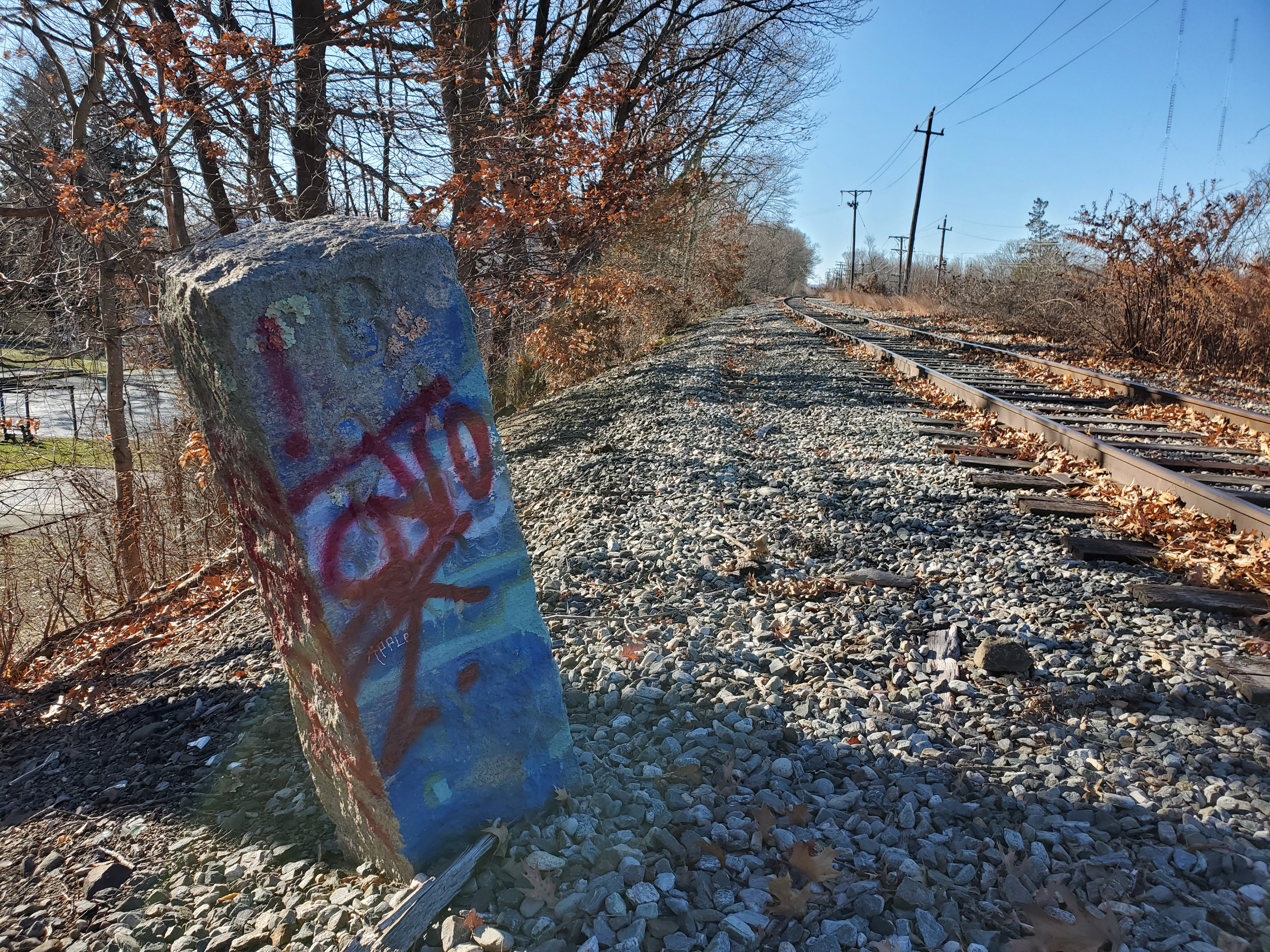
Boston and Providence Railroad milestone in East Providence

The bankrupt New Haven was absorbed by Penn Central at the end of 1968; this was the end of all remaining passenger service on the line. The Massachusetts Bay Transportation Authority (MBTA) acquired the piece in Massachusetts on January 27, 1973, despite it not seeing any passenger service; Penn Central continued to provide freight service via trackage rights. During Penn Central's tenure, trains ceased using the full length of the branch, with only local freight trains remaining. The newly independent Providence and Worcester Railroad assumed operations on the Rhode Island portion of the branch in 1976, while PC successor Conrail inherited freight rights on the Massachusetts portion. By 1976, the India Point Railroad Bridge and the associated trackage in Providence were also abandoned, though the bridge remained intact until the removal of the swing portion from 2001 to 2002. The remainder of the bridge was removed in 2023. The Crook Point Bascule Bridge was closed to rail traffic in 1981 following its purchase by the Rhode Island Department of Transportation, removing the last connection across the Seekonk River to Providence.

After assuming Conrail's operations on the branch, CSX formally placed the Massachusetts portion out of service in 2001 excluding the first 0.6 miles (0.97 km) in Attleboro where an active customer remained. The remainder of Massachusetts section had not seen trains since Conrail suspended service in the 1980s. In 2006, the remaining tracks of the Providence, Warren and Bristol Railroad were abandoned; the following year, the final half of a mile (0.8 km) of the East Junction Branch within East Providence was abandoned by the P&W, with a new connection built to the East Providence Branch. P&W continued to serve only the Rhode Island portion of the East Junction Branch until 2007, when a metals customer north of Newman Avenue in Seekonk asked for renewed rail service. P&W returned the line to service into Seekonk for the new customer that year. The remainder of the branch from Seekonk to Attleboro remains out of service as of 2017, but it has not been formally abandoned and the tracks have not been removed. MBTA Commuter Rail maintained a layover facility for passenger trains at East Junction until 2006.

=== Current operations ===
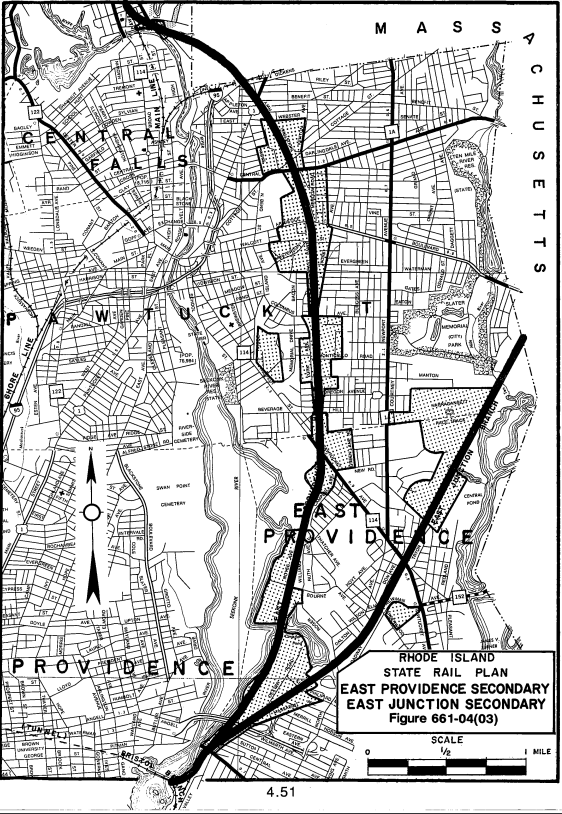
A map of the Rhode Island portion of the branch in 1993, showing its connection to the East Providence Branch

The P&W portion of the branch is served by local freight trains based out of Valley Falls Yard via the East Providence Branch. The branch is single-track and has a speed limit of 10 miles per hour (16 km/h).

== Former stations ==
No stations are known to be preserved.

Location	Station	Milepost (km)	Image	Notes
Attleboro	East Junction	0 (0)	old locomotive with one passenger car attached	Junction with Boston and Providence main line
Seekonk	Perrins	2 (3.2)	old two-story building the size of a small house near railroad tracks	Served as a flag stop under New Haven operation
Seekonk	Daggets	3.5 (5.6)		
Pawtucket	Narragansett Park	3.9 (6.3)	1958 train with many cars on curved track	Located on an approximately 0.4-mile (0.6-km) spur off the branch
Pawtucket	Slater	4 (6.4)		
East Providence	Rumford	5 (8.0)	1903 very small railroad station with people outside	
East Providence	Waterman Avenue	6.7 (10.7)		Not a station, Junction with the East Providence Branch; an interlocking station was constructed at this site
East Providence	East Providence	7 (11.3)	color picture of maroon passenger train stopped at station	Crosses Seekonk River at India Point; crossing moved north in 1908 with opening of East Side Railroad Tunnel and was the junction with the Providence-Bristol line
Providence	India Point	7.5 (12.1)	black and white photo of large rail station with streetlight, utility poles, and parked trolley cars	

== See also ==
- East Bay Bike Path
- Railroads in Rhode Island
- Boston and Providence Railroad
