= East Providence Branch =

Rail line in Rhode Island and Massachusetts

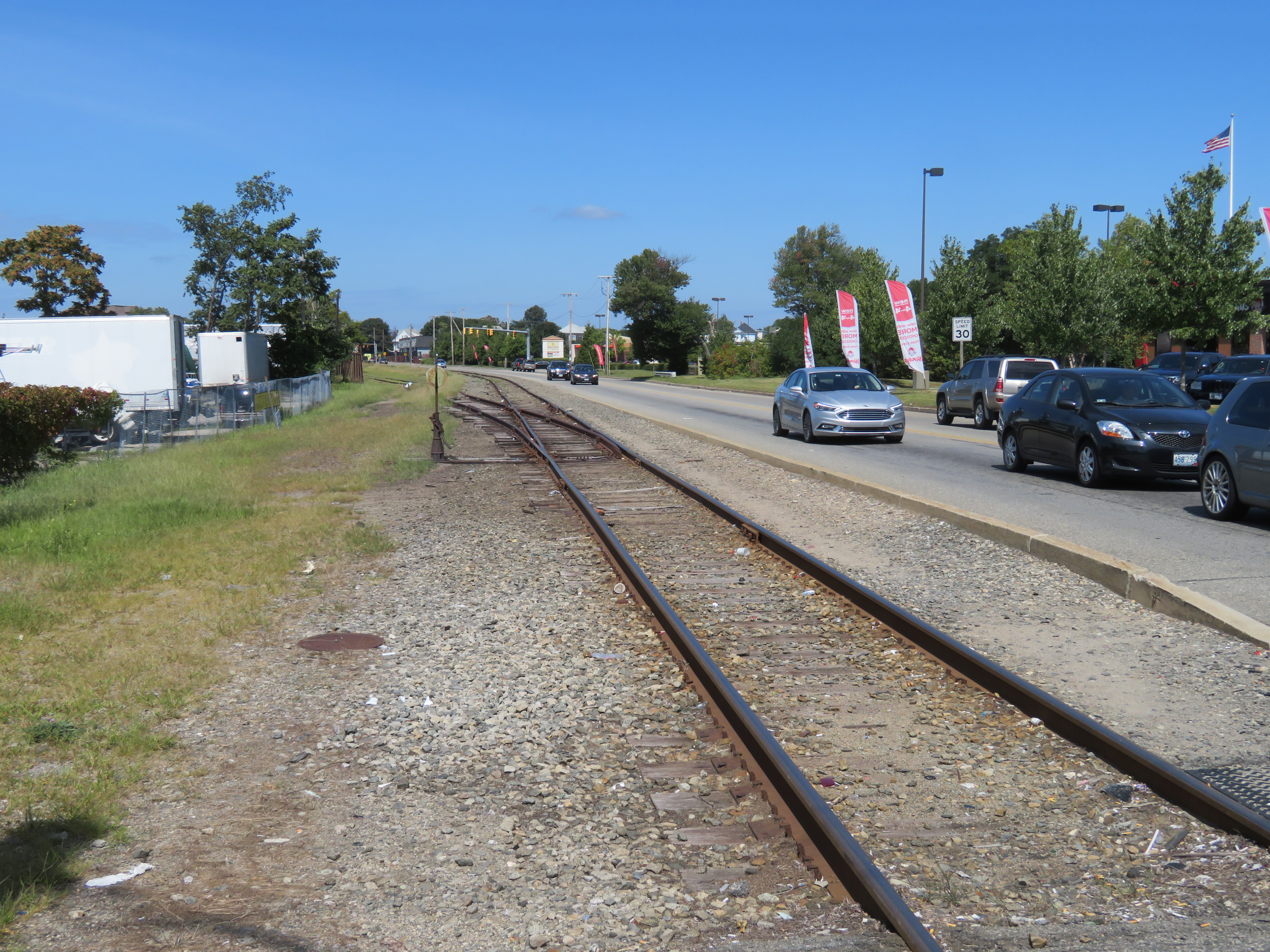
- The East Providence Branch in East Providence

Overview
- Owner: Rhode Island Department of Transportation
- Termini: Valley Falls, Rhode Island; East Providence, Rhode Island
- Continues from: Providence and Worcester Railroad main line
- Continues as: East Junction Branch

History
- Opened: 1874

Technical
- Track length: 7.0 mi (11.3 km)
- Number of tracks: 1 (formerly 2)
- Track gauge: 4 ft 8 1/2 in (1,435 mm) standard gauge
- Operating speed: 10 mph (16 km/h)
Route map
The current route of the East Providence Branch

The East Providence Branch is a railroad line in Rhode Island and Massachusetts, in the United States. It connects Valley Falls, Rhode Island, to East Providence, Rhode Island, via South Attleboro, Massachusetts, and Pawtucket, Rhode Island. The branch was originally built by the Providence and Worcester Railroad (P&W) in 1874, connecting its main line to a coal dock in East Providence, and was 7 miles (11 km) in length. At East Providence, the branch also met the East Junction Branch of the Boston and Providence Railroad and the mainline of the Providence, Warren and Bristol Railroad. Built as a single-track railroad with bridges and the right-of-way prepared for future double-tracking, the line was fully double-tracked from 1892 to 1895; the second track was eventually removed.

The P&W was leased by the New York, Providence and Boston Railroad in 1888; the NYP&B in turn was leased by the New York, New Haven and Hartford Railroad (the New Haven) in 1892. The New Haven operated the branch until its merger into Penn Central Transportation Company at the end of 1968; in February 1973, the P&W broke free of its lease and resumed operations of the branch it had originally built.

The final 1.41 miles (2.27 km) of the line were formally abandoned in 2006, with a new connection completed to the East Junction Branch that year. P&W operates local freight train service on the branch.

== Route ==
The branch begins in Valley Falls, Rhode Island, just south of Valley Falls Yard. It briefly enters Massachusetts in the southwestern corner of South Attleboro, crossing over Interstate 95, before reentering Rhode Island in Pawtucket after crossing over the Northeast Corridor. The line then parallels the George Bennett Highway for several miles, traveling southward in a nearly straight line. The branch continues past the terminus of the highway and enters East Providence, following the east bank of the Seekonk River and crossing the mouth of the Ten Mile River on the Omega Pond Railroad Bridge. Beyond the bridge, the branch curves eastward and connects to the East Junction Branch, via a new track built by the Providence and Worcester Railroad in 2006.

The original route, now abandoned, continues along the Seekonk River, passing under the Henderson Bridge, past the approaches to the disused Crook Point Bascule Bridge, and then beneath the Washington Bridge which carries Interstate 195. The right-of-way ends at the Wilkesbarre Pier by Bold Point.

== History ==
=== Design and construction ===
Initial surveys for a potential branch of the Providence and Worcester Railroad (P&W) to East Providence were completed in December 1867, by prominent Providence civil engineer S. B. Cushing. Cushing subsequently conducted further surveys, though the ultimately chosen route was very similar to that of the first survey.

The East Providence Branch was authorized in 1870 by the Rhode Island General Assembly, via an amendment to the Providence and Worcester Railroad's charter, with corresponding approval from the Massachusetts General Court for a small portion of the branch that entered South Attleboro, Massachusetts. It was to connect the tidewater areas of East Providence (at Bold Point) to the P&W main line in Valley Falls, Rhode Island.

The branch included a trio of bridges; from north to south, a 40-foot (12 m) high stone arch bridge over Abbott Run (a Seekonk River tributary), a 23-foot (7.0 m) high bridge crossing the Boston and Providence Railroad (B&P) line to Providence—this height was chosen to allow brakemen on top of B&P trains to safely pass under the bridge—and the 18-foot (5.5 m) high and 120-foot (37 m) long Omega Pond Bridge. Also near Abbott Run was a 40-foot (12 m) high fill, the largest on the line; the most significant cut was located at Walker Point (south of the Omega Pond Bridge) and extended 1,200 feet (370 m) with a depth of approximately 35 feet (11 m). The route was relatively flat, with the greatest incline being 37 feet (11 m) to the mile, or approximately 0.7 percent, in the vicinity of the Mount Saint Mary's Cemetery in Pawtucket.

South of the connection with the Boston and Providence Railroad's East Junction Branch, the remainder of the branch was constructed on land leased from both the B&P and the Providence, Warren and Bristol Railroad in order to reach Wilkesbarre Pier.

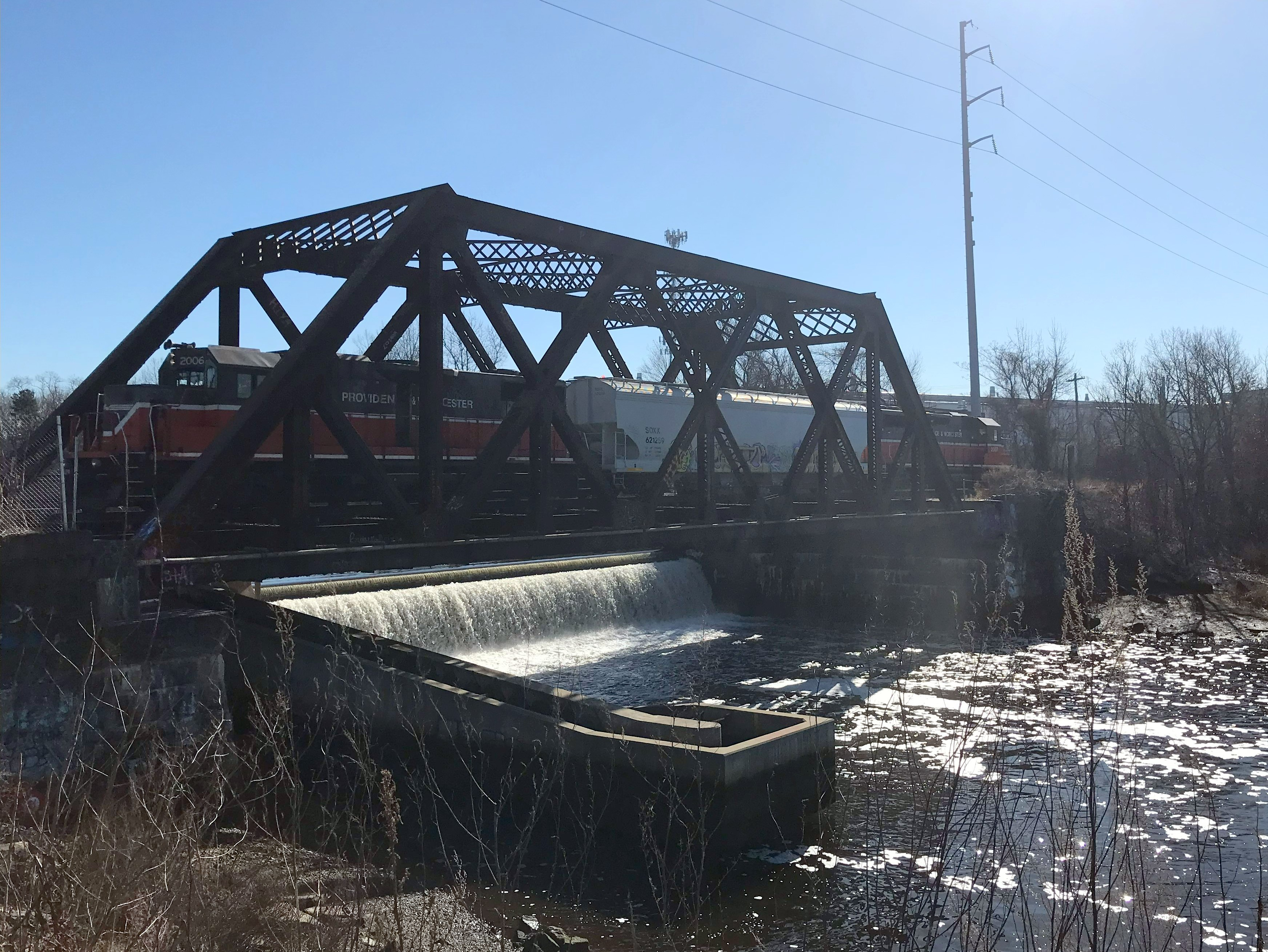
A P&W train crossing the Omega Pond Railroad Bridge in 2024

While initially single-track, the entire branch was designed and built to allow installation of double-track at a later date. The Providence Evening Press reported that, "The intention is not to construct a road as cheaply as it can be built, but in ballasting, masonry, track and equipments, to make it first-class in every respect." P&W president William Smith Slater (of the prominent Slater family) was a key proponent of the construction of the branch.

By the end of May 1874, significant work had been completed on the line. The first revenue train, a unit train of coal from the docks at India Point, traveled over the branch on September 7, 1874, though final construction, including ballasting, continued. The line was substantially completed in October 1874, with coal trains beginning regular use of the branch the following month. In the spring of 1875, the branch was fully opened to other freight traffic. Residual work on the branch continued until 1878.

=== Use ===
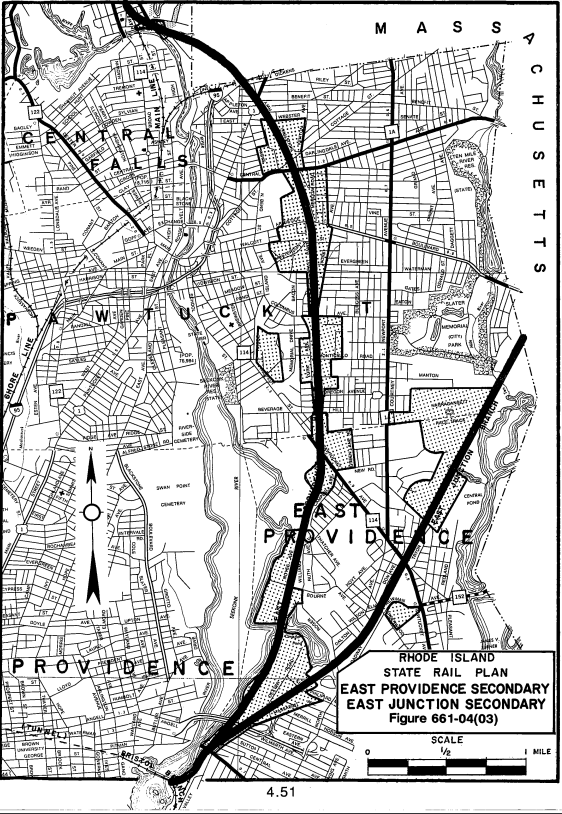
A 1993 map of the branch, before the southern portion was abandoned.

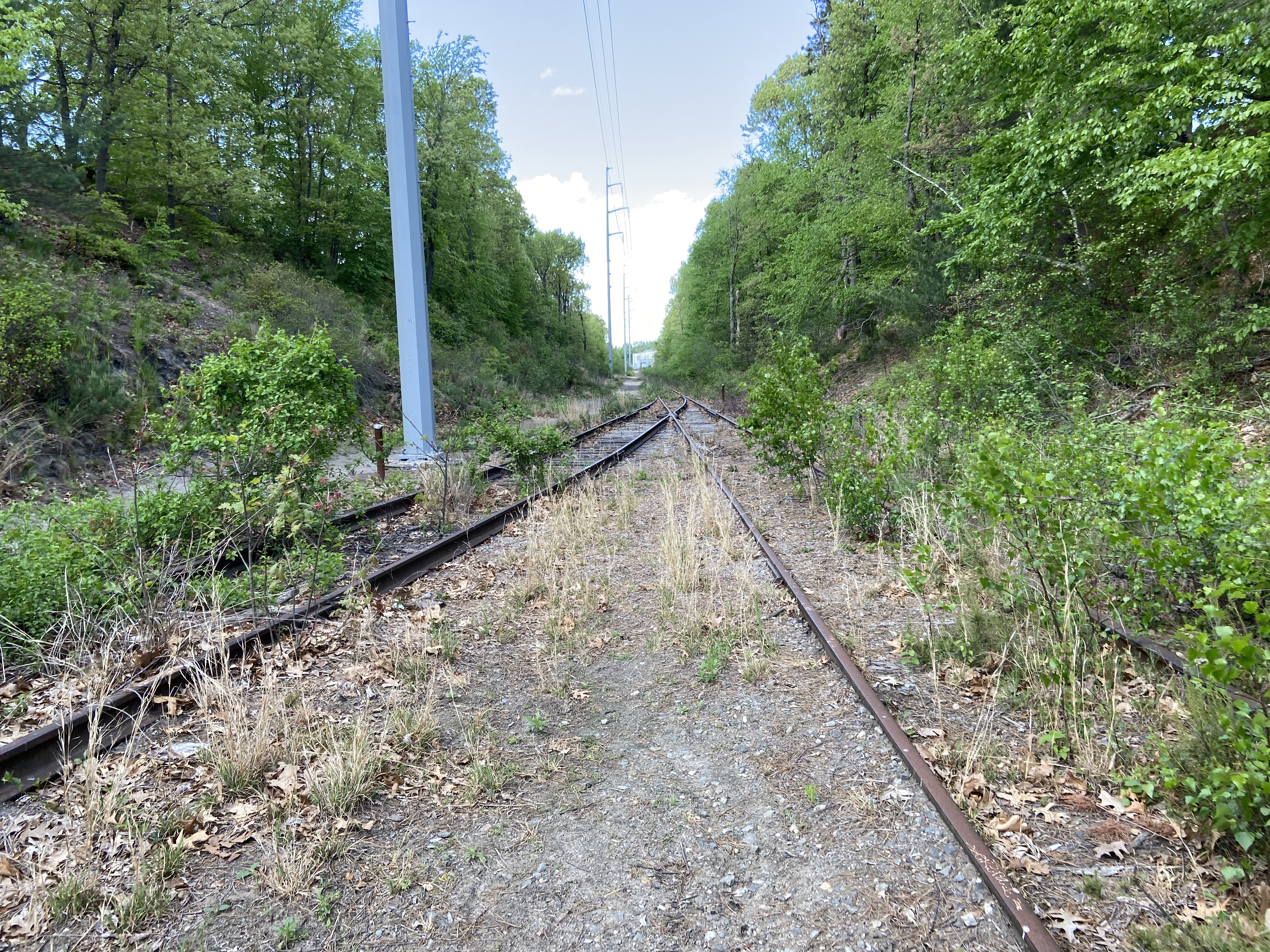
An abandoned portion of the branch in East Providence; the track at left is the Walker Point spur

Following the New York, Providence and Boston Railroad's (commonly referred to as the Stonington Line) 1889 lease of the Providence and Worcester Railroad, and the Old Colony Railroad's takeover of both the Boston and Providence and the Providence, Warren and Bristol, the two new operators in the area of the branch came into a dispute about the status of the southern portion of the branch. The Old Colony's president stated the company was happy to allow the Stonington Line to use the southern portion of the branch under the same lease situation as before, but only with a guarantee that the latter would not allow the Old Colony's competition (chiefly the New York and New England Railroad, which connected to Valley Falls) to make use of the branch. In response, the Stonington attempted to use the P&W's charter authority from 1870 to build a new alignment to Wilkesbarre Pier, over Old Colony land, claiming the P&W had technically not built that part of the branch yet. The Old Colony took the Stonington to court, arguing the scheme violated the P&W charter and would disrupt the Old Colony's facilities in the area.

Double-track was installed from Valley Falls to the Darlington neighborhood of Pawtucket in 1892. This was done in part to potentially allow for passenger trains between Woonsocket and Bristol to avoid congestion in Providence entirely, using the East Providence Branch to reach the Providence, Warren and Bristol Railroad, by now also a New Haven subsidiary. The remainder of the branch was double-tracked by the New Haven between 1894 and 1895, at a cost of approximately $18,000 ($680,000 in 2021).

The bankrupt New Haven Railroad was merged into the Penn Central Transportation Company at the end of 1968. Penn Central assumed operations of the P&W, including the East Providence Branch, as ordered by the Interstate Commerce Commission. The P&W still existed as a company, and convinced the Interstate Commerce Commission (ICC) that it should be allowed to separate from the Penn Central merger; several years of legal battles ended with a court order in P&W's favor in December 1972. On February 3, 1973, the East Providence Branch and the rest of the P&W system returned to P&W operation. The Rhode Island Department of Transportation purchased the entire line in 1982 in order to build the Pawtucket Industrial Highway adjacent to the active tracks.

== Operations ==
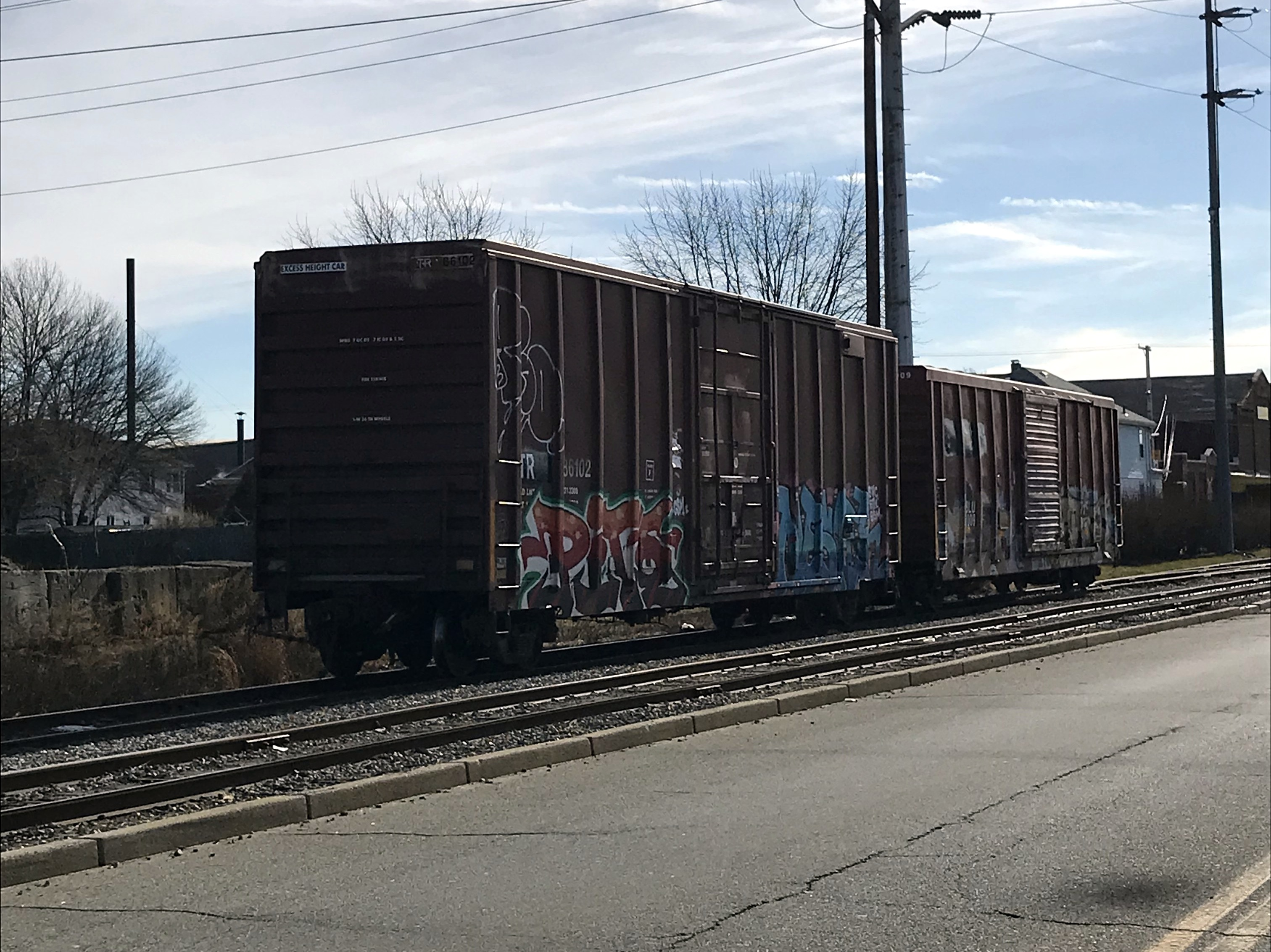
Boxcars on a siding for customer Key Container in Pawtucket

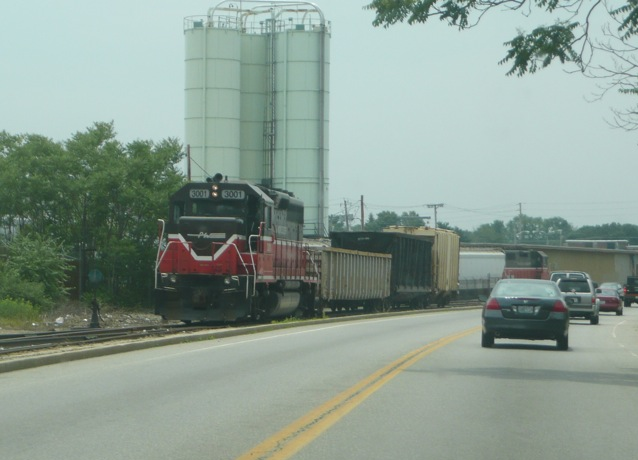
A P&W freight train switching customer Teknor Apex in Pawtucket in June 2008

Shippers located along the branch are served by a local freight train on Tuesdays and Thursdays, based out of Valley Falls Yard, just north of the branch's connection to the P&W mainline. This train continues to the East Junction Branch to serve customers as needed.

Most of the grade crossings on the line are protected only by traffic lights, without the flashing lights, bells, and gates typical of grade crossings. P&W and the Rhode Island Department of Transportation have both identified this as a safety hazard. The city of Pawtucket worked with the railroad to rehabilitate grade crossings along the branch in 2024, following years of complaints about vehicle damage at crossings. The branch is single-track and maintained to Class I standards (a maximum speed of 10 miles per hour (16 km/h).

== Station listing ==
Station	Milepost (km)	Image	Comments
Valley Falls	0.0 (0.0)	A single-story railroad building. Signs on the building identify it as property of the Providence and Worcester Railroad and mention a safety goal of no injuries.	Junction with P&W main line and the Rhode Island and Massachusetts Railroad (Valley Falls Branch); freight house still extant
Darlington	1.7 (2.7)	A single story building, showing railroad influence in its design. It is no longer next to railroad tracks but maintains its original design.	Freight house still extant
Phillipsdale	4.7 (7.6)		
East Providence	6.5 (10.4)	A train station, with an electric multiple unit train parked. Catenary wires for the trains are visible.	Junction with the East Junction Branch (Boston and Providence Railroad)
