= Providence, Warren and Bristol Railroad =

Defunct railroad in Rhode Island

Providence, Warren, and Bristol Railroad
- System map, 1918
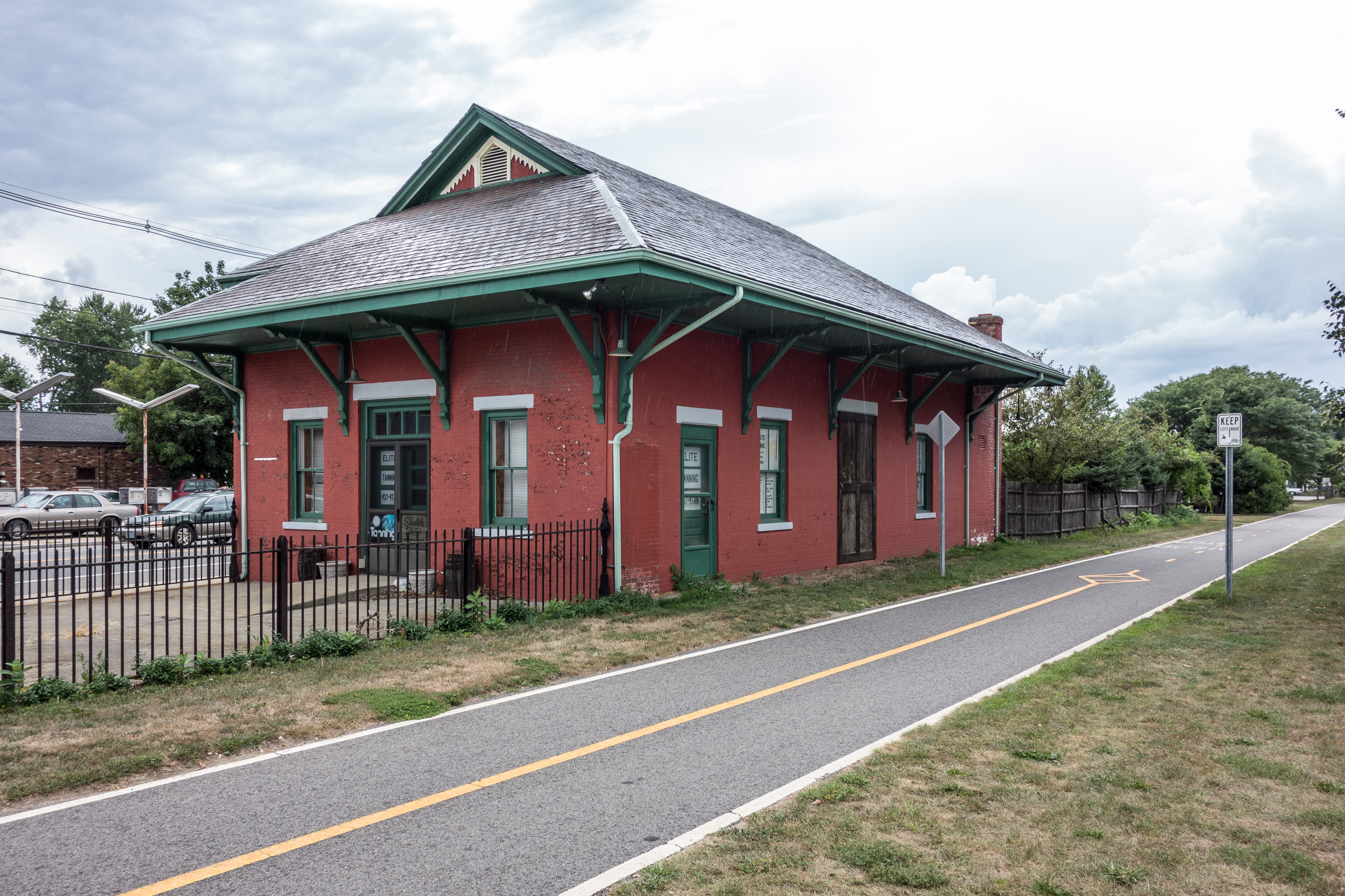
- The former Riverside train station still stands next to the former tracks, which are now the East Bay Bicycle Path

Overview
- Stations called at: 21
- Parent company: Boston & Providence Railroad, Old Colony Railroad
- Reporting mark: PW&B
- Locale: Bristol County, Rhode Island, Providence County, Rhode Island, East Bay (Rhode Island)
- Dates of operation: 1855–1888 (Independent operations), 1888-1893 (Old Colony Railroad), 1893-1969 (New York, New Haven, and Hartford Railroad), 1969-1976 (Penn Central), 1976-2006 (Providence & Worcester Railroad)
- Successors: Old Colony Railroad; New York, New Haven and Hartford Railroad; Penn Central Transportation Company; Conrail; Providence & Worcester Railroad

Technical
- Track gauge: 4 ft 8 1/2 in (1,435 mm) standard gauge
- Electrification: Overhead line, 600 V DC (electrified 1900-1934)
- Track length: 14.1 miles (22.7 kilometers)

The Providence, Warren and Bristol Railroad (also known as the Bristol Secondary) was a railroad in the state of Rhode Island that connected the city of Providence with Bristol, Rhode Island. The company was formed in 1854 by merging the Providence, Warren and Bristol Railroad Companies of Massachusetts and Rhode Island. The 14.1-mile line itself was completed on July 12, 1855.

Most of the line south of East Providence was abandoned in 1976; all rail operations ceased on the remainder of the line in 2006. The former right-of-way has since been converted into the East Bay Bike Path.

== History ==
The Boston and Providence Railroad originally terminated their 1835 mainline at India Point on an alignment that presently exists as the East Junction Branch; this line became a branch in 1847 with the opening of the new B&P mainline from East Junction to Providence. In 1848, Union Station opened in the center of Providence; it became the Boston & Providence's main terminal and the facilities along the harbor were used thereafter mainly for freight. The Boston & Bristol Railroad received a charter in 1850 to construct a railroad from East Providence to Bristol via Warren. In 1855, the newly renamed Providence, Warren and Bristol Railroad opened as a Bristol extension of the India Point Branch along the eastern bank of the Seekonk River. Initially, passenger cars were hauled by horse to the Providence & Worcester depot until 1857, when the PW&B built its own depot on India Street.

The B&P had initially operated the line until 1860, when the PW&B started using their own locomotives. The line had originally crossed state boundaries when it had first opened; a portion of the line ran through the town of Seekonk, Massachusetts. The area of Seekonk that banked the Seekonk River was reincorporated as East Providence, Rhode Island as part of a boundary settlement between the two states in 1862; this positioned the PW&B right-of-way entirely within the boundary of Rhode Island.

In 1865, the Fall River, Warren and Providence Railroad built a western branch off the PW&B line at a junction in Warren. Initially, the branch ran from Warren to Brayton Point in Somerset, Massachusetts, which required a ferry transfer to Fall River. The ferry transfer lasted until 1875 when the Slades Ferry Bridge was constructed which allowed trains to cross the Taunton River into Fall River Depot. The two lines were related to the Boston & Providence and Old Colony Railroad, their connections at East Providence and Fall River, respectively. Full ownership of each line was acquired in 1872 by the Boston & Providence which subsequently sold the Fall River Branch to the Old Colony the next year.

=== Operations under Old Colony and NYNH&H ===
In 1888, the Old Colony leased the B&P and thereby put the two "Warren" lines under one management. On July 1, 1891, the line was leased to the Old Colony Railroad for 99 years. Later in 1893, the PW&B was absorbed into the New York, New Haven and Hartford Railroad, upon its lease of the Old Colony Railroad system. During this time, PW&B trains reached a Providence depot near Fox Point using the B&P's India Point bridge.

Providence's Union Station was located just west of the PW&B's northern terminus. Attempts were made to run full size freight cars over the trolley tracks to Union Station, which resulted in frequent derailments. This issue prompted the construction of the Crook Point Bascule Bridge along with a mile-long tunnel under Providence's east side known as the East Side Railroad Tunnel; both the tunnel, bridge, and a 1,000 foot-long (304.8 m) downtown viaduct were completed in 1908.

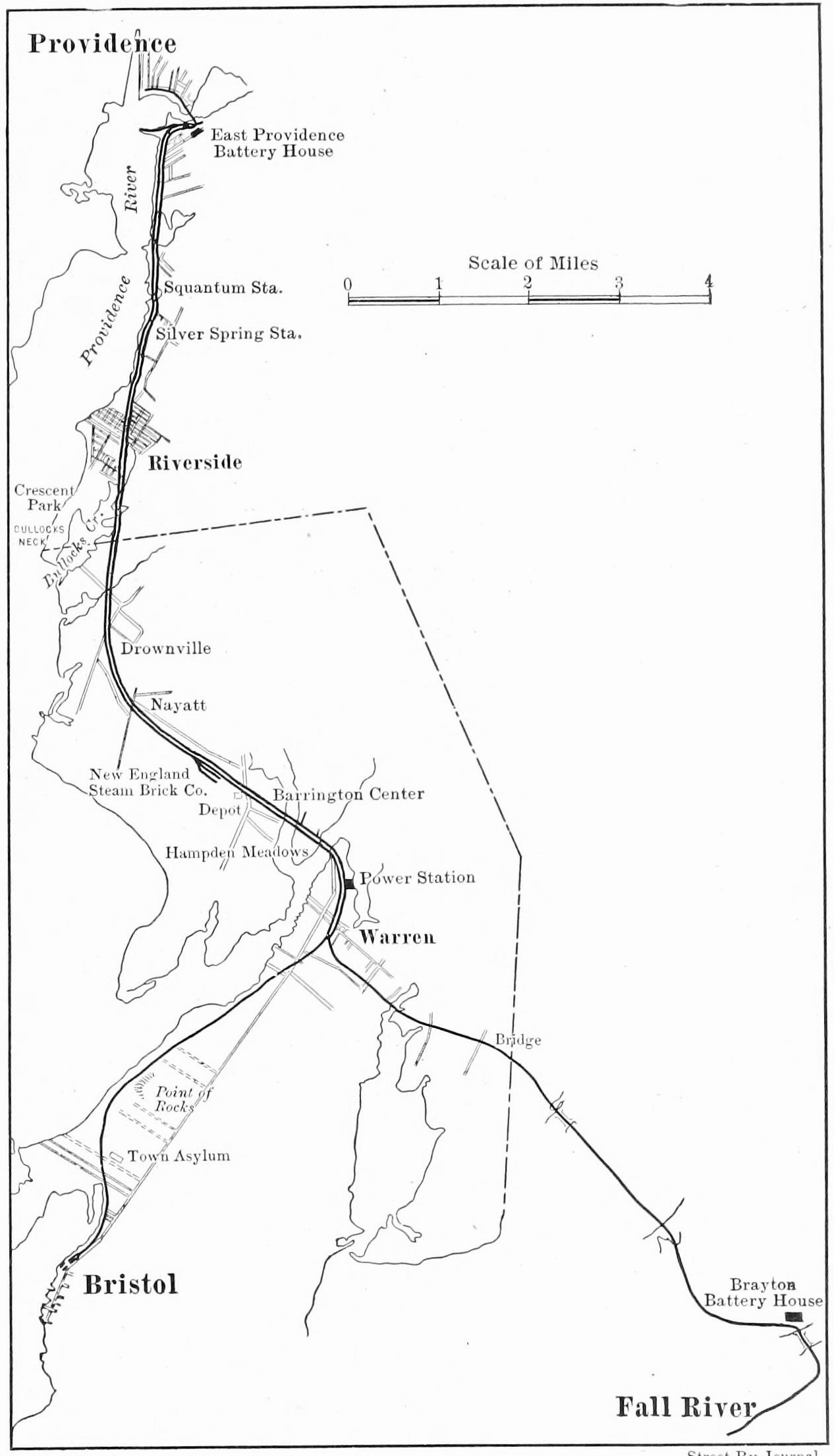
1902 map of route electrification

==== Electrification ====
Under the New Haven, the PW&B and the Fall River Branch were one of the few electrified heavy-rail lines in New England outside of Massachusetts and Connecticut during the early twentieth century. The New Haven electrified both lines in 1900; the overhead was a standard 600 Volt DC single-wire trolley system. Former locomotive-hauled coaches were converted into self-propelled cars which used trolley poles as opposed to pantographs. Due to the high frequency of the route (headways were projected to be eight to ten minutes at peak times), the line could be considered the only rapid transit service to ever exist in Rhode Island.

To handle peak rush-hour power demands, two battery stations were built close to the Providence & Fall River ends of the line; off-peak, the batteries were "float-charged" by the power plant in Warren. During rush hour periods, the battery stations would pick up some of the load, easing the burden on the powerhouse. Under electrification, the line operated similarly to an interurban service with the unique distinction that it utilized full-size heavy-rail equipment. Freight services were still operated by steam locomotives after the line was electrified.

=== Route ===
The PW&B's northern terminus was at India Point, where it branched from the B&P East Junction Branch; this junction formed a wye on the east side of the Seekonk River, with the southern leg being the PW&B mainline. After the construction of the East Side Tunnel, all Bristol and Fall River services originated from Providence Union Station. The line then ran through East Providence then through Riverside, Barrington, and Warren with double track between Providence and Warren, a distance of 10 miles (16.1 km). In Warren, the line split into two single-track branches; one going east to Fall River via the Slade's Ferry swing bridge, the other to the railroad's southern terminus at Bristol, Rhode Island. Select Bristol-bound trains street-ran on streetcar trackage to reach Church Street and Constitution Street beyond the Bristol terminal station.

== Decline ==
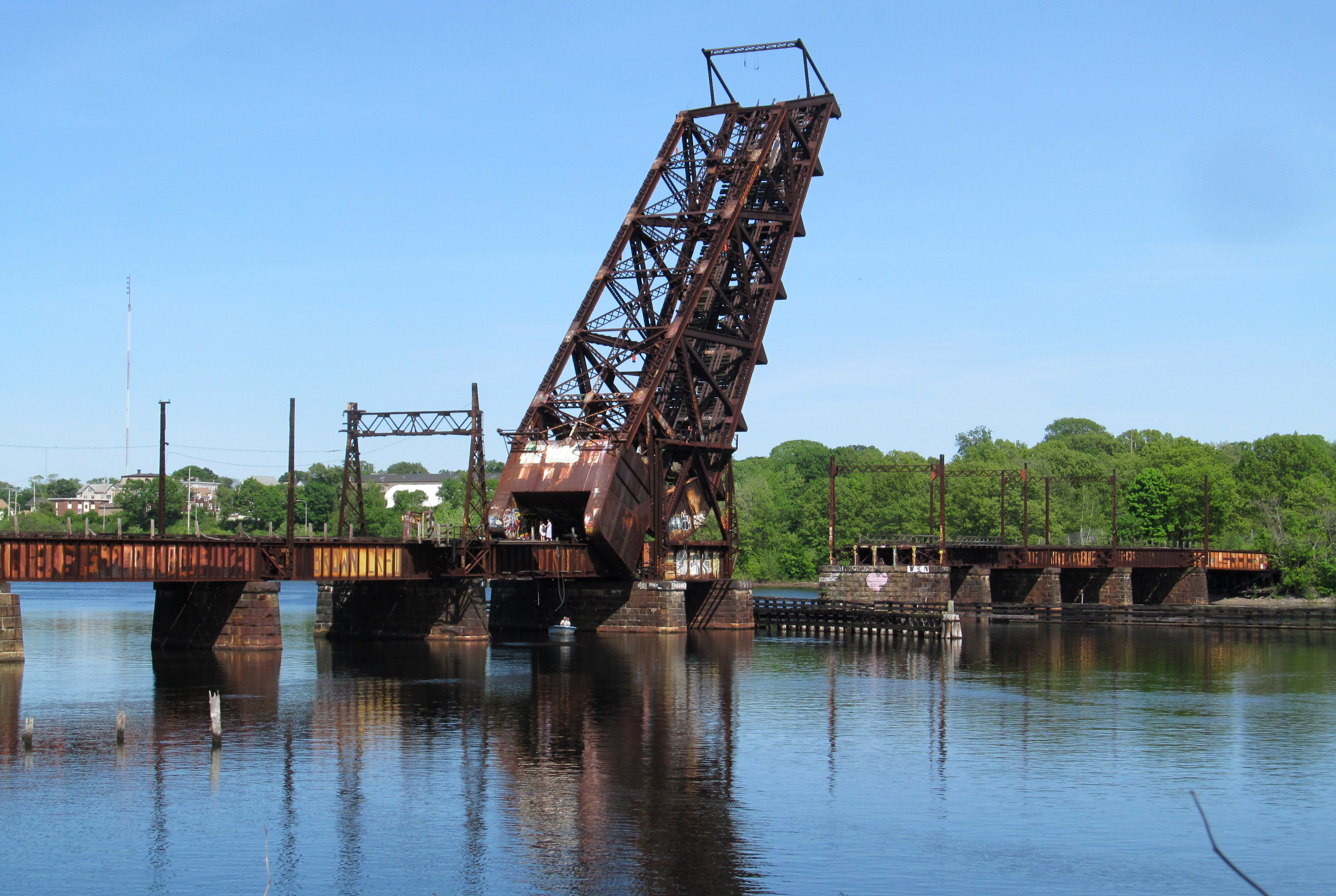
Abandoned Crook Point Bascule Bridge; notice the catenary structures on the span

Although the line was well patronized and service was frequent for many years, growing automobile ownership and the steady reduction of industry in East Bay during the Great Depression doomed the line. Passenger service to Fall River ceased after a ship struck and caused irreparable damage to the Slade's Ferry Bridge in 1932; the bridge was converted for automobile traffic only and the line was truncated back to Brayton Point in Somerset. That same year, all passenger service and through freight service ended south of Weir Junction on the Dighton and Somerset mainline when the swing bridge located at Mallard Point, located roughly 4 miles (6.4 km) north of the Slade's Ferry Bridge, was disabled after a ship hit another bridge carrying power cables; this combined with the truncation of the Fall River branch effectively eliminated all east-west mainline rail connections to Fall River. Electrified passenger service was cut-back before being entirely ceased on the Bristol line in 1934; passenger service was switched over to gas-electric cars until being entirely ceased by 1937, after which the line was used exclusively for freight. That same year, freight service on the Fall River Branch ceased when the entire branch was abandoned, with the exception of the first half-mile between Warren and East Warren which was retained as a stub.

Freight and excursion services continued on the Bristol line for the next three decades. NYNH&H successor Penn Central took control of the line in 1969, which abandoned the Warren-to-Bristol segment in 1973; the remaining segment only saw freight service once or twice per week involving consists no longer than four cars per train. Conrail inherited the line from PC in 1976 which abandoned the rest of the line south of Pomham in Riverside. The newly independent Providence and Worcester Railroad assumed operations of line the same year and further truncated the line to Bold Point in East Providence. The Crook Point Bascule Bridge and the East Side Tunnel were acquired by the state of Rhode Island in 1981 and all rail operations ceased shortly thereafter; the downtown Providence viaduct was demolished when the Northeast Corridor was re-routed to facilitate remodeling of the downtown area in Providence in the early 1980s. In the present day, the Crook Point Bridge and East Side Tunnel remain abandoned and isolated from any active rail lines.

Freight continued to service a scrapyard at Wilkesbarre Pier until the early 2000s; by 2006, the portion between India Point and Pomham had been legally abandoned by the P&W.

=== Commuter rail proposals ===
Before the line's full abandonment, the Rhode Island Department of Transportation briefly considered restoring passenger service to the PW&B right-of-way as a state-subsidized commuter rail line within a 1981 transit study that evaluated options to realign the Northeast Corridor. The commuter line, referred within the study as East Side Rail Transit, would have operated commuter trains between Providence Union Station and Bristol via the East Side Tunnel. Proposed intermediate stations were East Providence, West Barrington, Barrington and Warren. In Providence, the East Side line would have met another proposed commuter line operating between Providence and Davisville along the Northeast Corridor. The study also proposed other alternatives such as a shorter East Side light rail alignment. RIDOT demolished the downtown Providence viaduct during the re-routing of the Northeast Corridor later in the 1980s; this permanently severed the East Side Tunnel from the Northeast Corridor and precluded the option for the future implementation of commuter rail or light rail.

The restoration of passenger rail on the Bristol Secondary was studied in 1994 as a part of a larger state rail corridor feasibility study. The purpose of the study was to determine the potential for the use of the existing or rail-banked railroad rights-of-way for public transportation facilities and services. Restoration of the Bristol Secondary for commuter rail service was evaluated to cost $72.72 million with a total annual operating cost of $13.92 million; it was estimated the line would attract 2,900-4,300 daily riders. The study acknowledged that rail restoration to Bristol would need to accommodate the existing rail-trail; the proposed routing included the East Junction Branch between Attleboro and East Providence. Another proposal indicated the construction of a new rail bridge across Mount Hope Bay to connect the Bristol Secondary to the Newport Secondary; light rail alternatives were also considered for the line. Ultimately, none of the rail service proposals from the 1994 study were funded or approved.

== Conversion to rail trail ==
In 1992, most of the PW&B right-of-way opened as the East Bay Bike Path. In areas where the right-of-way was double tracked, the bike path occupies one of the main lines; the parallel main line and remaining trackage are occasionally visible running alongside the paved bikeway. The track passes the original station in Riverside, which is now used as a café.

The Crook Point Bascule Bridge permanently remains in an open up-right position; the catenary structures on the bridge span remain one of the only remnants of the line's former electrification. The East Side Tunnel portals have since been sealed. Multiple proposals have since been made to repurpose the tunnel and bridge as part of a BRT or light-rail line. A more recent plan in 2021 involved converting the area around the bridge into a park; however, that plan has since been subsequently abandoned.

== Station list ==
Location	Station	Miles (km)	Image	Notes
Providence	Providence (India Point before 1908)	0.0 (0.0)		Later relocated to Providence Union Station with opening of East Side Railroad Tunnel in 1908
East Providence	East Providence (India Point)	2.0 (3.2)		Junction with India Point Branch
East Providence	Gulf	3.5 (5.6)		
East Providence	Kettle Point	4.0 (6.4)		
East Providence	Squantum	4.5 (7.2)		
East Providence	Silver Spring	5.0 (8.0)		
East Providence	Union Club	5.3 (8.5)		
East Providence	Pomham	5.5 (8.9)		
East Providence	Riverside	6 (9.6)		Station structure still extant
East Providence	Bullocks Point	6.5 (10.5)		
Barrington	Drownsville (Crescent Park)	7 (12.1)		
Barrington	West Barrington	7.5 (12.1)		
Barrington	Nyatt	8.5 (13.7)		
Barrington	Barrington	10 (16.1)		
Barrington	Hampden Meadows	10.5 (16.9)		
Warren	North Warren	11 (17.7)		
Warren	Warren	11.5 (18.5)		Junction with Warren-Fall River branch
Warren	South Warren	12 (19.3)		
Bristol	Beach Terrace	13.5 (21.7)		
Bristol	Bristol Highlands	14 (22.5)		
Bristol	Poppasquash Road	15 (24.1)		
Bristol	Bristol	16 (25.7)		

== Gallery ==
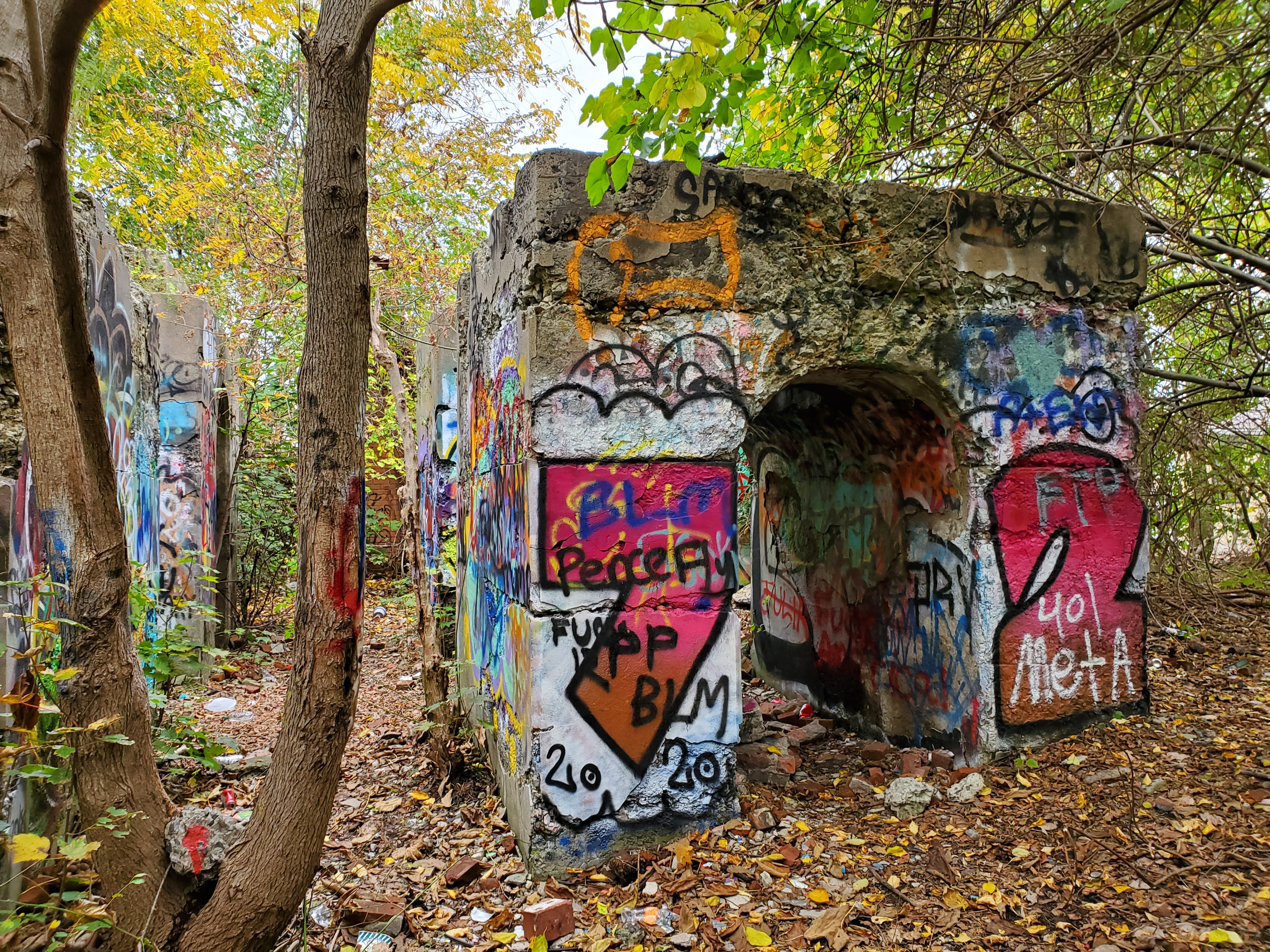
Remains of the boiler foundations from Warren powerhouse in 2020

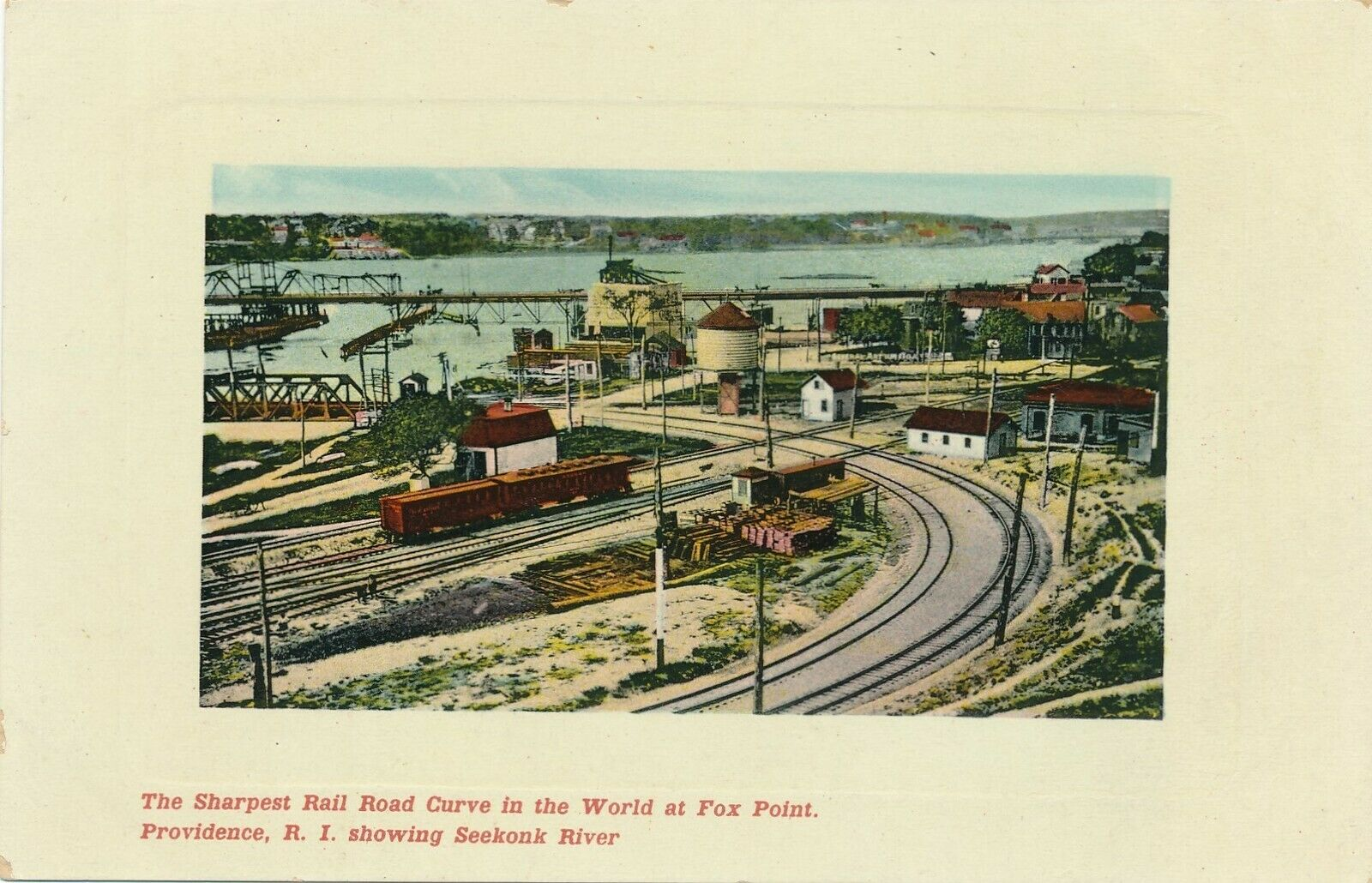
Fox Point railroad curve; this is where the PW&B crossed over the East Junction Branch

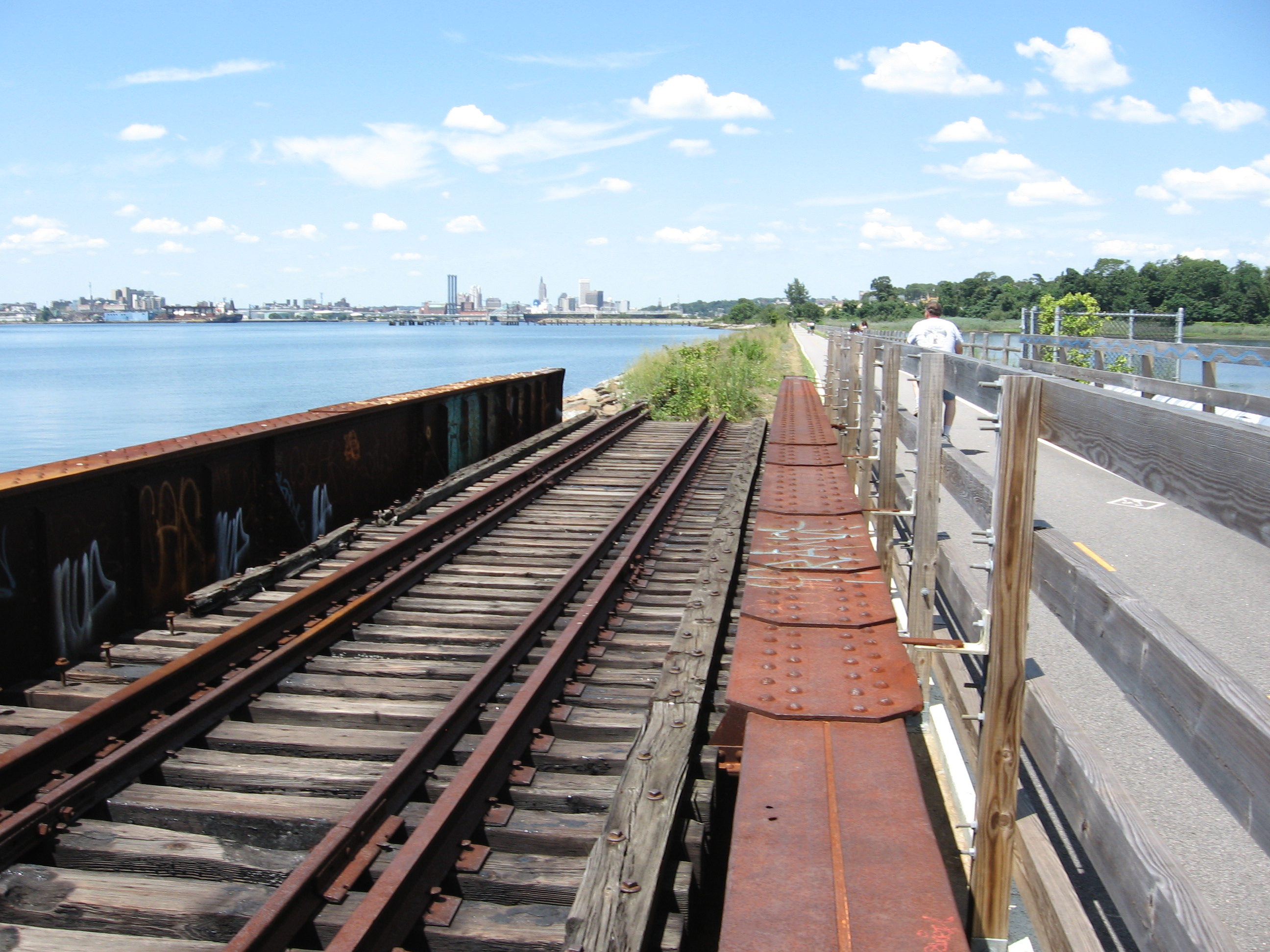
Abandoned rails still extant on a bridge adjacent to the bike path over Watchemoket Cove

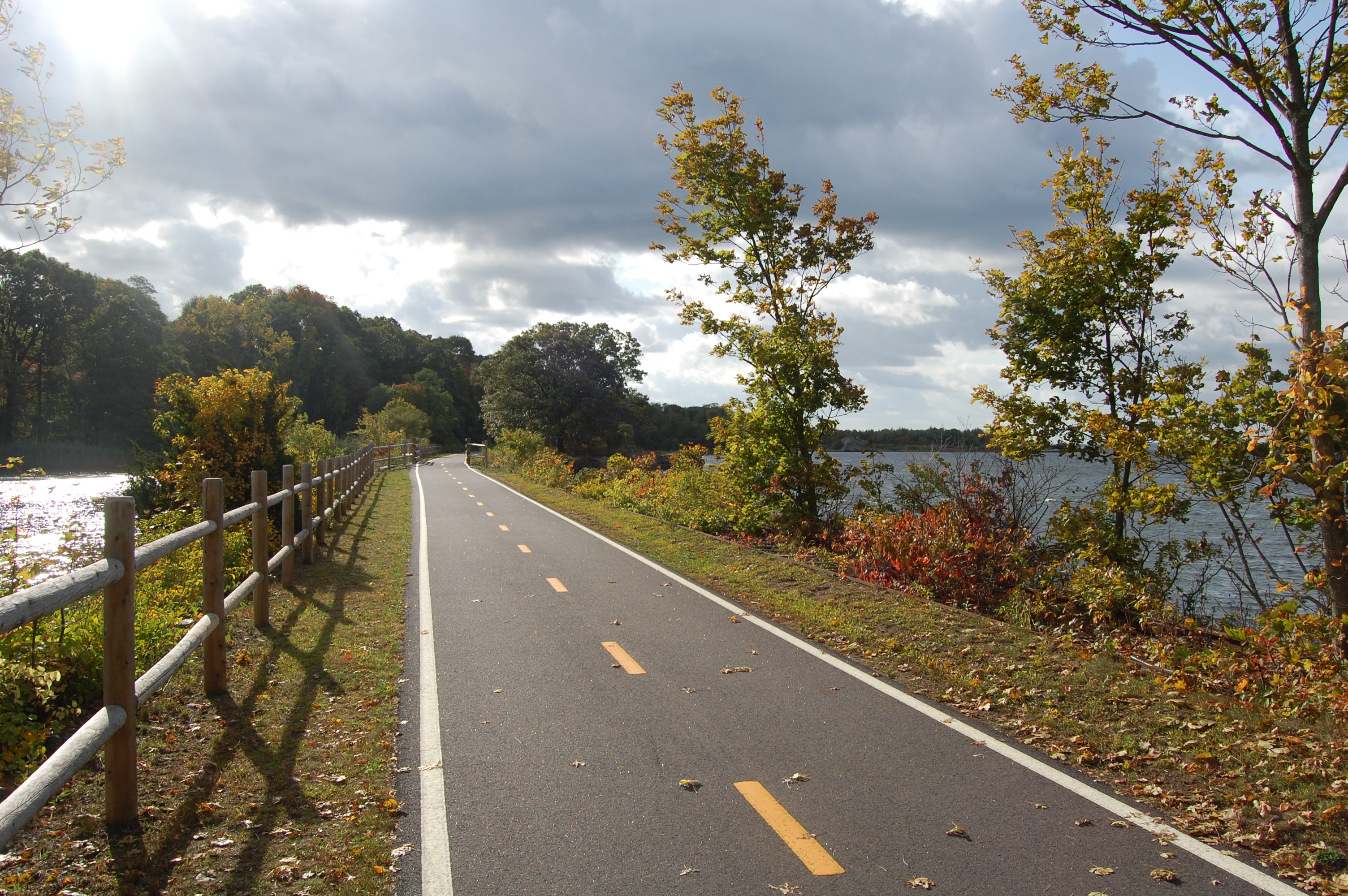
Former PW&B right-of-way near former Squantum station

== See also ==
- East Bay Bike Path
- Railroads in Rhode Island
- Railroad electrification in the US
- List of Old Colony Railroad stations
