= West Bay =

There are a number of places in the world, both bays and communities, known as West Bay.

== Americas ==
=== Canada ===
- West Bay (Newfoundland and Labrador)
- West Bay, Nova Scotia (disambiguation), multiple places
- West Bay, Ontario, an Ojibwe First Nations reserve

=== Cayman Islands ===
- West Bay, Cayman Islands, a town on Grand Cayman.

=== United States ===
- West Bay (Michigan), an arm of Grand Traverse Bay.
- West Bay (Texas), a bay in Texas separated from the Gulf of Mexico by Galveston Island
- West Bay (San Francisco Bay Area), the peninsula containing San Francisco, California

== Antarctica ==
- West Bay (Fallieres Coast), a small bay within Marguerite Bay, Fallieres Coast.
- West Bay (Heard Island), a small bay on the west coast of Heard Island.

== Qatar ==
- West Bay (Doha), a bay in the capital, Doha, in which the West Bay Lagoon is located, and the name of an area in the capital.

== United Kingdom ==
- West Bay, Dorset, formerly known as Bridport Harbour, approximately two miles from Bridport on the Jurassic Coast in Dorset, England

== See also ==
- East Bay (disambiguation)
- North Bay (disambiguation)
- Sai Wan
- South Bay (disambiguation)
