= North Bay =

North Bay may refer to:

== Places ==
Antarctica

- North Bay (Ross Island), a bay

Canada

- North Bay, Ontario, a city in Ontario, Canada
  - CFB North Bay

United States

- North Bay Village, Florida, a city in Miami-Dade County, Florida
- North Bay, New York, an unincorporated community
- North Bay, Door County, Wisconsin, an unincorporated community in Door County, Wisconsin
- North Bay, Wisconsin, a village in Racine County, Wisconsin
- North Bay Shore, New York, a census-designated place in Suffolk County, New York
- North Bay (San Francisco Bay Area), a subregion of the San Francisco Bay Area in California

== Others ==
- North Bay Aqueduct, a part of the California State Water Project
- North Bay Breakers, an American football (soccer) team based in Santa Rosa, California
- North Bay Centennials, a defunct ice hockey team in the Ontario Hockey League
- North Bay Battalion, a major junior ice hockey team in the Ontario Hockey League (2013 to present)

== See also ==
- Northbay
- South Bay (disambiguation)
- East Bay (disambiguation)
- West Bay (disambiguation)
