= Tung Wan =

Tung Wan (東灣, lit. "East Bay") is the name of several bays in Hong Kong:

- Peng Chau
- Double Island (Wong Wan Chau)
- Ma Wan
- Cheung Chau
- Shek Pik, Lantau Island
- Tai A Chau, Soko Islands
- Tai Long Wan, Sai Kung Peninsula

== See also ==
- Tung Wan Beach (disambiguation)
