= Rhode Island and Massachusetts Railroad =

Railway line in the United States

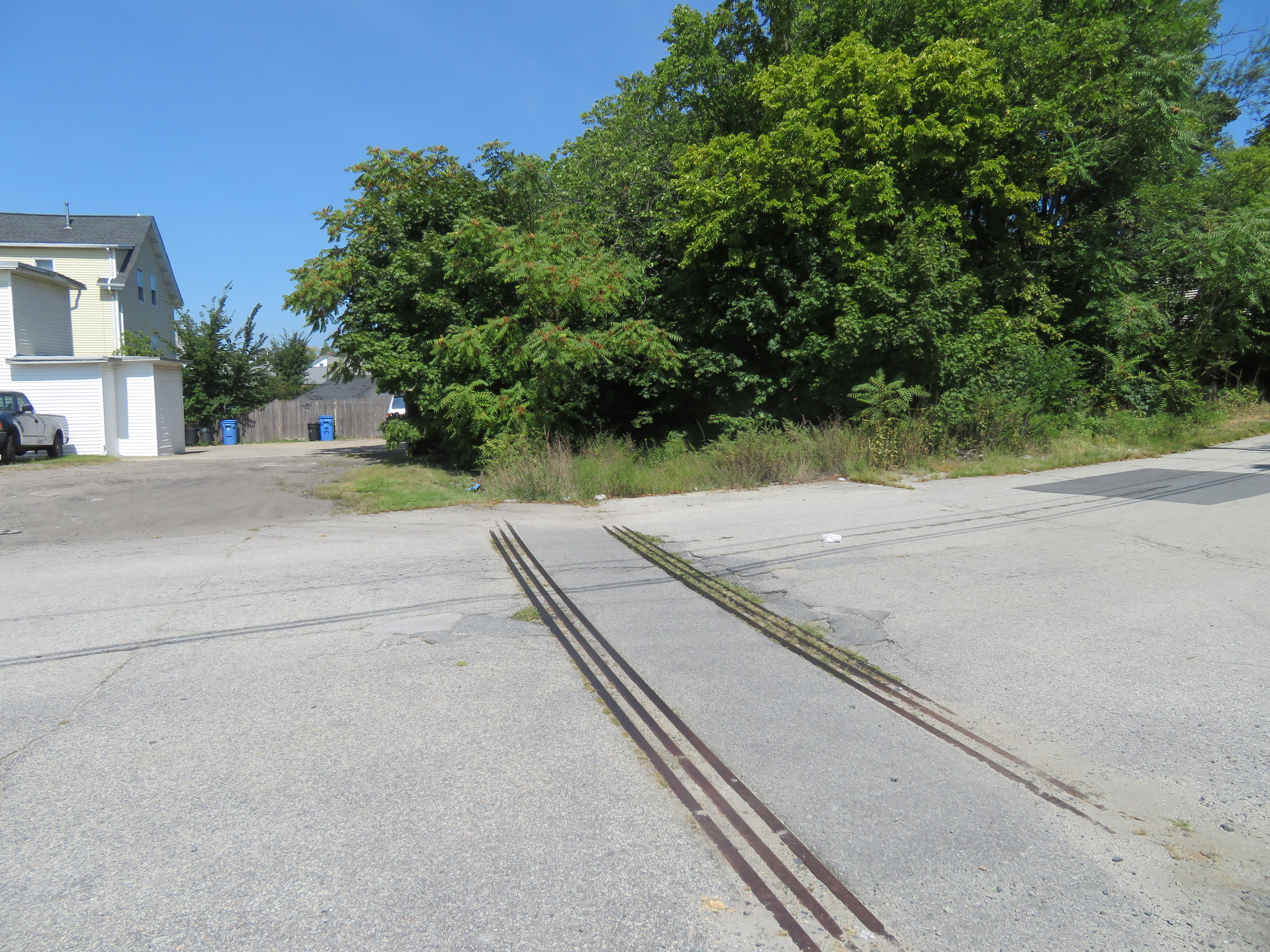
- Abandoned tracks of the line in Valley Falls, near Valley Falls Yard

Overview
- Operator: New York and New England Railroad; New York, New Haven and Hartford Railroad
- Dates of operation: 1877–1963

Technical
- Track gauge: 4 ft 8 1/2 in (1,435 mm) standard gauge
- Length: 13.5 miles (21.7 km)

The Rhode Island and Massachusetts Railroad was a 13.5-mile (21.7 km)-long rail line built to connect Franklin, Massachusetts, and Valley Falls, Rhode Island, organized in 1875 and completed in 1877. The railroad was operated by the New York and New England Railroad, its northern connection, upon completion. Connection was made with the Providence and Worcester Railroad at Valley Falls Yard. The two railroads offered a connecting passenger service between Boston and Providence, Rhode Island, though it was less direct than the competing Boston and Providence Railroad.

After the New York, New Haven and Hartford Railroad (the New Haven) assumed control of the New York and New England, it had relatively little use for the line other than as a detour for the Boston and Providence Railroad line as needed. Passenger service on the line ended in 1930. The New Haven abandoned most of the Rhode Island and Massachusetts Railroad in 1941, keeping only the first two miles out of Valley Falls to Adamsdale, Massachusetts, which connected with another branch line originating at Norwood. This connection and most of the remaining branch were abandoned in 1963. A final mile of the branch within Valley Falls survived into operation by Penn Central and subsequently the newly independent Providence and Worcester Railroad in 1973 but was abandoned by 1994.

Preserved railroad structures along the line include a depot at Adamsdale and freight houses at Abbotts Run, Arnolds Mills, and West Wrentham.

== Station listing ==
State	Municipality	Station	Miles	Comments
MA	Franklin	Franklin	0.0 (0.0)	On the Norfolk County Railroad mainline
MA	Franklin	Franklin Junction	0.5 (0.8)	Not a station; junction with the Norfolk County Railroad mainline and the Milford and Woonsocket Railroad
MA	Wrentham	West Wrentham	4.1 (6.6)	Preserved freight house built circa. 1877
RI	Cumberland	Grants Mills	6.0 (9.7)	
RI	Cumberland	Diamond Hill	7.1 (11.4)	
RI	Cumberland	Arnolds Mills	8.2 (13.2)	Preserved freight house built circa. 1877
RI	Cumberland	Abbotts Run	9.5 (15.3)	Preserved freight house built circa. 1877
MA	North Attleborough	Adamsdale Junction	11.6 (18.7)	Not a station; junction with the Wrentham Branch
MA	North Attleborough	Adamsdale	12.1 (19.5)	Preserved depot built circa. 1877
RI	Cumberland	Cumberland Mills	13.2 (21.2)	
RI	Cumberland	Valley Falls	14.0 (22.5)	Junction with the Providence and Worcester Railroad at Valley Falls Yard
