= Tung Wan Beach =

Tung Wan Beach (Chinese: 東灣泳灘) may refer to the following beaches in Hong Kong:

- Cheung Chau Tung Wan Beach, a gazetted beach in Cheung Chau
- Ma Wan Tung Wan Beach, a gazetted beach in Ma Wan
