= Crook Point Bascule Bridge =

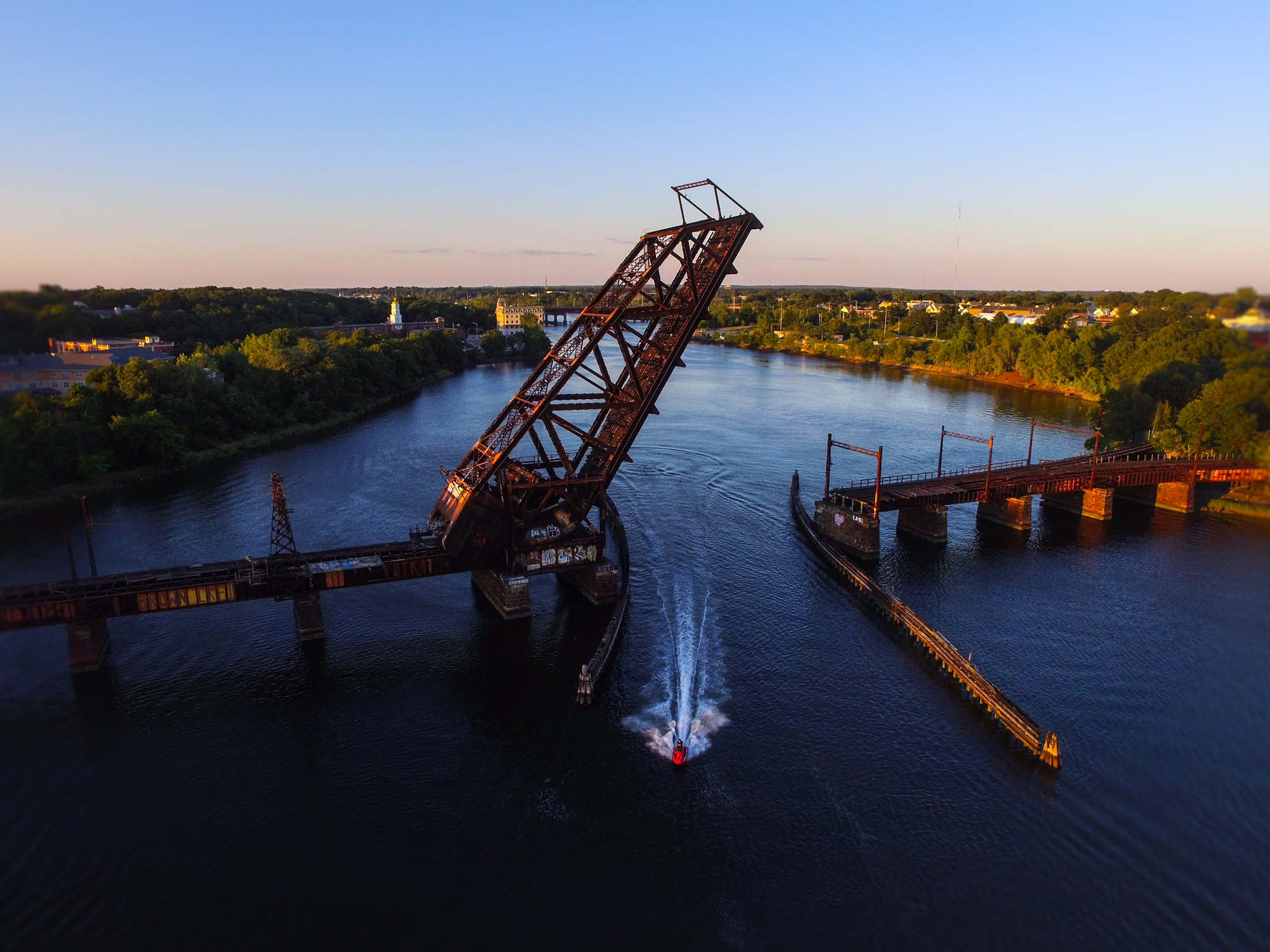
- The abandoned bridge in 2016
- Coordinates: 41.82379°N 71.38497°W
- Carries: New York, New Haven and Hartford Railroad
- Crosses: Seekonk River
- Locale: between Providence and East Providence
- Other name: Seekonk River Drawbridge
- Owner: RIDOT

Characteristics
- Design: bascule bridge
- Material: Steel
- Total length: 850 feet (260 m)
- Longest span: 125 feet (38 m)

Rail characteristics
- Track gauge: 4 ft 8 1/2 in (1,435 mm) standard gauge
- Electrified: Overhead line, 600 V DC (electrified 1900-1934)

History
- Designer: Scherzer Rolling Lift Bridge Company
- Opened: 1908
- Closed: 1976

Location
- Interactive map of Crook Point Bascule Bridge

The Crook Point Bascule Bridge (or the Seekonk River Drawbridge) is a defunct Scherzer rolling lift railway bridge that spans the Seekonk River, connecting Providence to East Providence, Rhode Island. Since its abandonment in 1976, it has been stuck in the open position and is known to nearby residents as the "Stuck-Up Bridge," having become a local icon of urban decay. In 2022, Providence Journal described the bridge as "a T-shirt-ready symbol of Providence's quirky evolution from industrial to creative hub."

== History ==
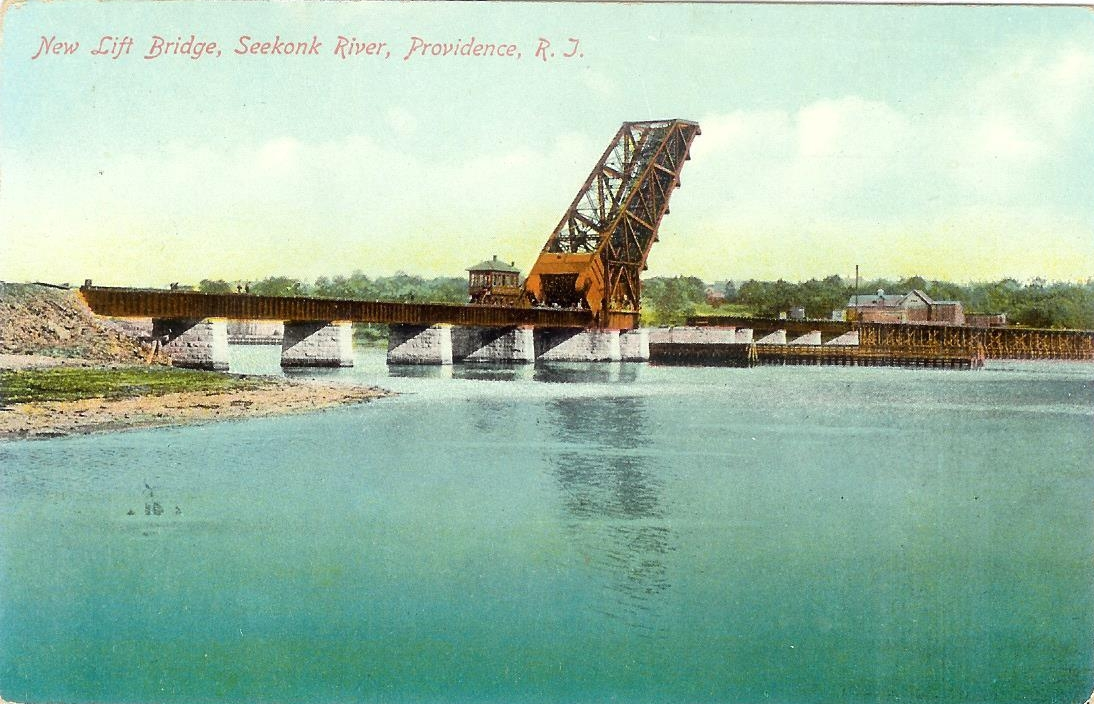
Postcard view of the then-new bridge, prior to the installation of catenary

As part of the East Side Railroad Tunnel project, the Crook Point Bascule Bridge was built in 1908 to provide a direct connection between Providence Union Station and New York, New Haven and Hartford Railroad lines on the East Providence side of the Seekonk River. The span connected the Bristol Secondary, Fall River Branch, East Providence Branch, and the East Junction Branch with the East Side Rail Tunnel. Designed by Scherzer Rolling Lift Bridge Company of Chicago, it measures 850 feet (260 m) across, raises to a 64-degree angle, and opens a clear waterway 125 feet (38 m) wide. From 1908 to 1934, the bridge was electrified with a 600-Volt DC overhead trolley system to accommodate electric regional rail services between Providence, Bristol, Rhode Island, and Fall River, Massachusetts. Catenary masts are still extant on the abandoned bridge deck and are one of the only remnants of the line's former electrification.

In 1969, the Crook Point Bridge transferred ownership to Penn Central, the successor to NYNH&H. Due to declining railroad usage, plans were drafted to demolish Union Station in 1970; during this time, PC requested permission from the ICC to abandon the East-Side access line due to low freight demand. Conrail inherited the Bristol Secondary from the now-bankrupt PC in 1976, and further attempts were made to rail-bank the right-of-way. The newly independent Providence and Worcester Railroad assumed operations of the East-Side access line and the Bristol Secondary; however, most of the line from East Providence to Bristol was abandoned by 1976. Consequently, the Crook Point Bridge and the East Side Tunnel were abandoned that same year, with the bridge fixed in its current open position to allow river transit.

== Decay ==
Since its abandonment, the bridge has been a target of graffiti, vandalism, and artistic and archaeological interest. The western entrance to the bridge is easily accessible from a paved bike path off an athletic field near the intersection of Gano and Williams streets. While some wooden components of the tracks have rotted or burnt away and various electrical cables have been disconnected, the metal structure remains largely intact, albeit rusted. This combination of factors attracts various visitors to venture onto the tracks and even climb the drawbridge, despite the highly dangerous conditions. Students from nearby colleges have also produced photography projects, documentaries, and studies featuring the bridge. One study by a Brown University archaeology student suggests that the bridge has functioned as a center of athletic initiation, punk counterculture gathering, and even suicide since 1976.

== Proposed demolition and future ==
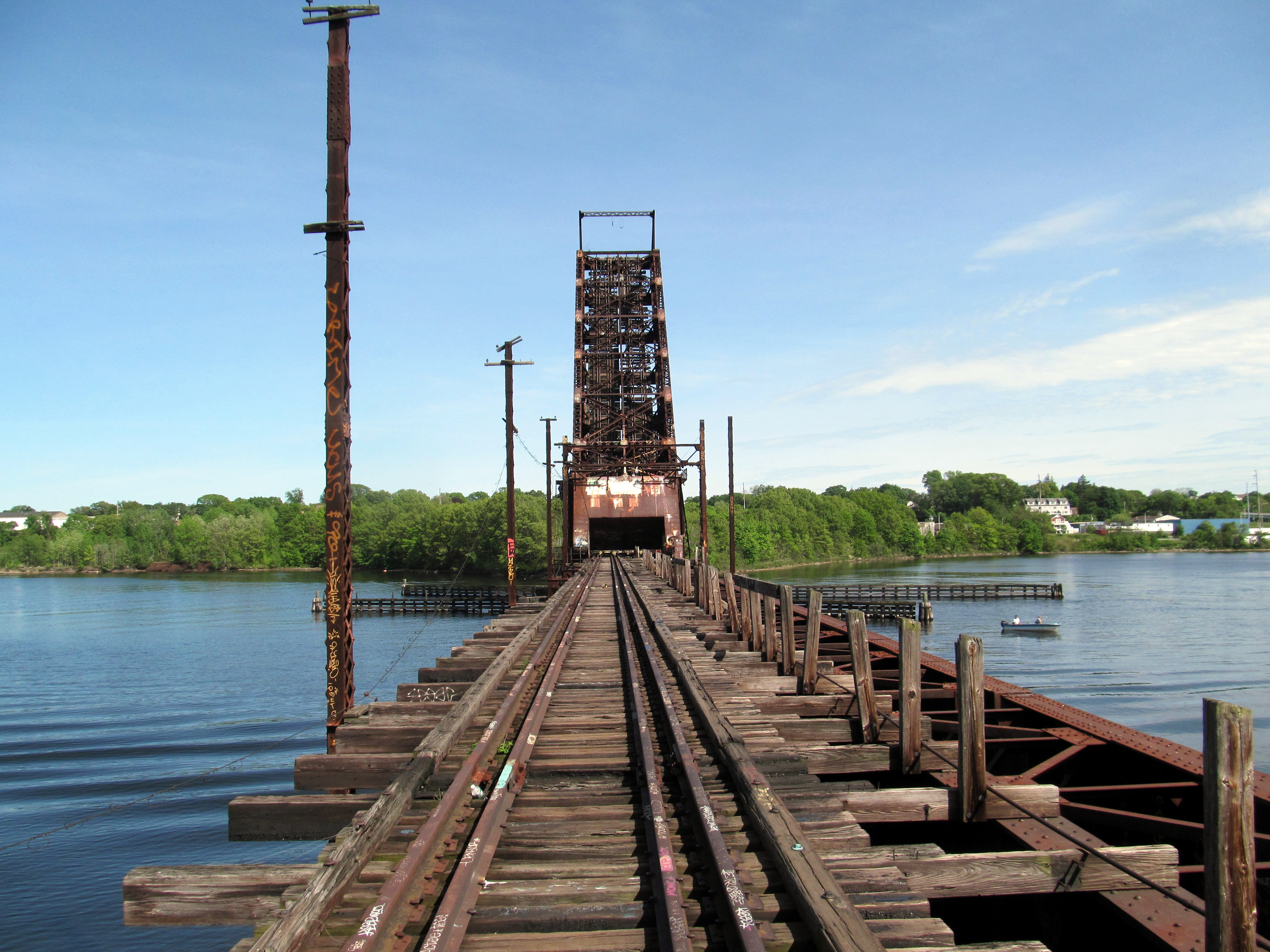
View across the bridge in 2017

In 2003, Brown graduate Robert Manchester proposed a $30-million plan calling for the development of Crook Point, including the eastern landing of the bridge. His proposal featured plans to reopen the bridge and tunnel as a light rail system, bringing commuters from East Providence to Thayer Street and downtown Providence.

In May 2006, Mayor David Cicilline organized Transit 2020, an advisory group determined to find alternative transit solutions for Providence to overcome some limitations of RIPTA, on which it depends heavily. Transit 2020's first report included an analysis describing the East Side Railroad Tunnel and Seekonk River Bridge line as a potential corridor for a light rail or bus rapid transit system.

In 2018, the Rhode Island Department of Transportation indicated plans to demolish the bridge in 2026–2027. In 2019, the city offered to take ownership of the bridge to prevent demolition. The city held a design contest for reuse of the bridge; the winning proposal, announced in June 2021, would turn the trestle sections of the bridge into a public park. On June 29, 2021, the bascule span was damaged by a fire of unknown origin. A RIDOT inspection in July found that the steel structure was not damaged, allowing plans to transfer ownership to the city to move forward; however, this did not occur. By mid-2022, all plans to convert the bridge into a park were canceled due to costs and low public support; in turn, RIDOT resumed demolition plans for the bridge.

In January 2025, the city of Providence indicated that it would reattempt to acquire ownership of the bridge from RIDOT to further prevent demolition. Providence mayor Brett Smiley cited the abandoned bridge as a potential value capture opportunity to induce development; however, no plans for the site nor funding have been identified.

There are no current plans to redevelop or demolish the bridge.

== See also ==
- India Point Railroad Bridge
- Sakonnet River rail bridge
