= Boston and Providence Railroad Bridge =

- U.S. National Register of Historic Places
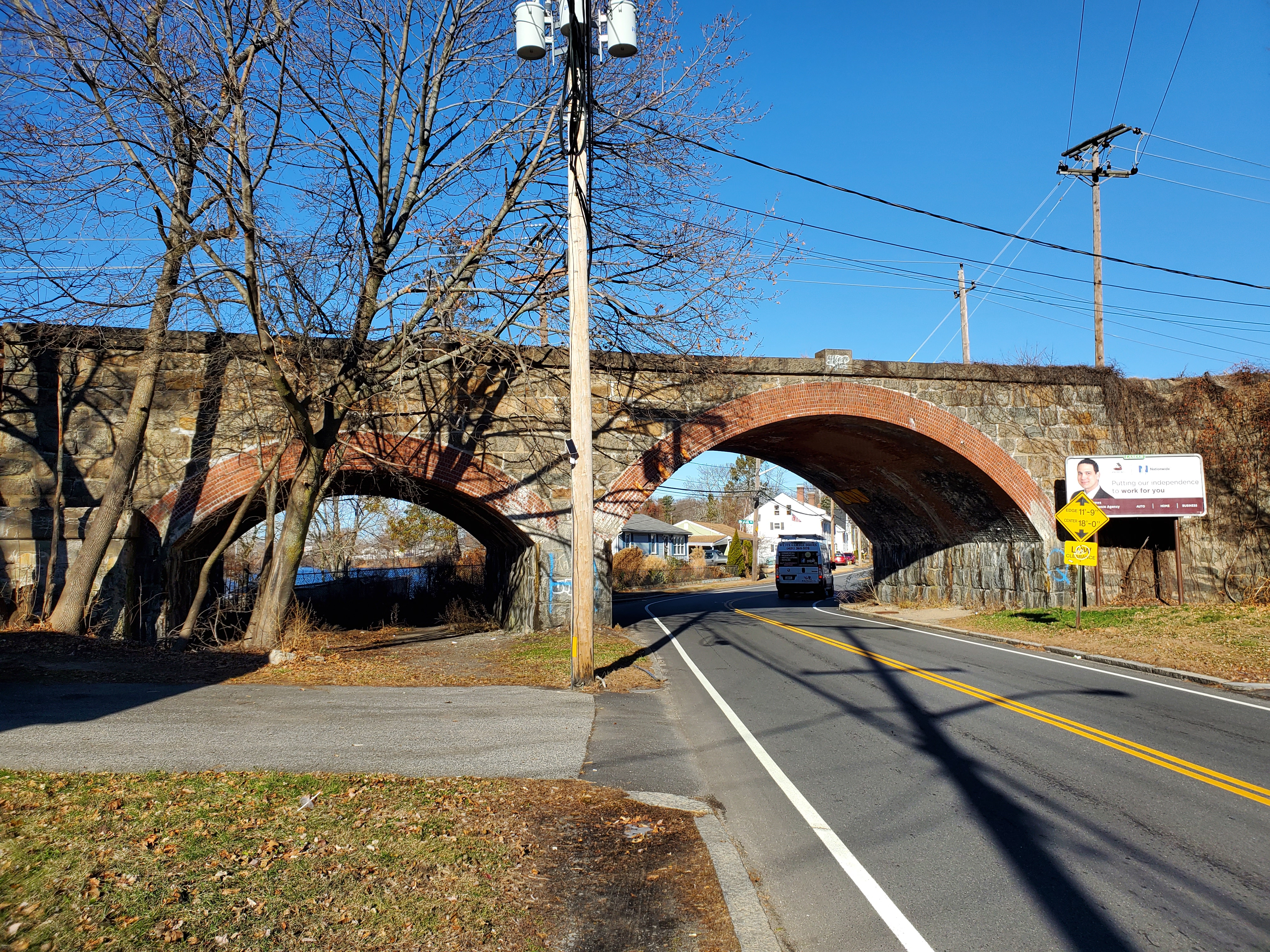
- The two arch spans of the bridge in December 2021

- Location within Rhode Island Location within the United States
- Location: East Providence, Rhode Island
- Coordinates: 41°50′5″N 71°21′45″W
- Built: 1884
- MPS: East Providence MRA
- NRHP reference No.: 80000086
- Added to NRHP: November 28, 1980

The Boston and Providence Railroad Bridge in East Providence is a railroad bridge on the East Junction Branch spanning Ten Mile River. A portion of the bridge also spans Roger Williams Avenue. The bridge was built in 1884 by the Boston and Providence Railroad, replacing an earlier structure on the line. The bridge abutments are faced in coursed ashlar stone, with brick-faced segmental-arch tunnels piercing them. The main span of the bridge consists of two Warren trusses resting on the abutments and a central pier in the Ten Mile River. The bridge formerly carried two tracks, but has been reduced to one.

The bridge was listed on the National Register of Historic Places in 1980. It continues in active service carrying Providence and Worcester Railroad freight trains between East Providence and Seekonk, Massachusetts.

== See also ==
- List of bridges on the National Register of Historic Places in Rhode Island
- National Register of Historic Places listings in Providence County, Rhode Island
