= East Bay (Rhode Island) =

East side of Narragansett Bay, Rhode Island

Coordinates: 41°36′51.9″N 71°14′56.7″W

Narragansett Bay divides the state of Rhode Island into two parts. The term East Bay refers to communities on the east side of the bay, including Bristol, Warren, Barrington, Tiverton, Little Compton, Newport, Middletown, Portsmouth and Jamestown. The city of East Providence is commonly included, especially the community of Riverside. The term West Bay refers to communities on the west side of the bay (the mainland), such as Warwick, Cranston and East Greenwich. Jamestown and the towns on Aquidneck Island are sometimes known as "The Islands" along with Block Island.

The East Bay contains the East Bay Bike Path which runs for 14.3 miles from Providence to Bristol. In Bristol, the path begins at Independence Park on Thames St. and Oliver St. and in Providence, the path begins at India Point Park on Tockwotton St. and India St. In 2009, the bike path was inducted into the Rail-Trail Hall of Fame. The path is home to numerous species of coastal wildlife and gorgeous views of the bay.

Newport is home to the International Tennis Hall of Fame. The hall was opened by the President of the Newport Casino, Jimmy Van Allen and his Wife, Candy, in the 1950s. The hall was officially recognized by the International Tennis Federation in 1986. Newport is also home to the Newport Mansions. These mansions include: The Breakers, The Elms, Marble House, Rosecliff, Chateau-sur-Mer, Isaac Bell House, Kingscote, Chepstow, Hunter House and Green Animals Topiary Garden. The Breakers was the summer house of Cornelius Vanderbilt II and The Rosecliff mansion was setting more multiple movies including 27 Dresses, The Great Gatsby and Meet Joe Black.

Bristol is the home of the oldest Fourth of July Celebration in the United States of America. The celebration was founded in 1785 by Rev. Henry Wight of the First Congregational Church. Today, the celebrations are run by the Bristol Fourth of July Committee and begin on June 14, also known as Flag Day. Annual celebrations include the parade, a concert series, a drum and bugle corps competition, a ball, a pageant, a carnival in the town common, and a derby.

== Barrington, Rhode Island ==
Barrington is located on the east shore of Narragansett Bay, 10 miles southeast of Providence via U.S. 95 and 195. (195 connects with RI 114, which becomes County Road at the White Church in Barrington, Main Street in Warren, and Hope Street in Bristol) No point in Barrington is more than two miles from salt water. Barrington Land Area: 8.9 sq. miles Barrington Water Area: 7.0 sq. miles

== Bristol, Rhode Island ==
Bristol, the southernmost town in Bristol County, is easily accessible from RI 114 and 136 which connects to U.S. 195 and from Rtes. 24 and 138 on Aquidneck Island. Bristol Land area: 10.1 sq. miles Bristol Water area: 10.5 sq. miles

== Warren, Rhode Island ==
Warren is located in the center of Bristol County and is bordered by Bristol to the south and Barrington to the north. It is accessible from RI 114 and 136 which connect to US Route 195. Warren Land area: 6.2 sq. miles Warren Water area: 2.5 sq. miles

== Populations ==
- Barrington - 16,819
- Bristol - 22,469
- Warren - 11,360

The East Bay contains multiple beaches. The public beaches include: Barrington Town Beach, Bristol Town Beach, First Beach, Fogland Beach, Fort Adams Beach, Goosewing Beach, Grinnell's Beach, King Park Beach, Jamestown Town Beach, Second Beach, Sandy Point Beach, South Shore Beach, Teddy's Beach, Third Beach and Warren Town Beach.

Things to do on the East Bay: -Bike Path -Newport Mansion Tour -Tennis Hall of Fame Museum -Fort Adams -Cliff Walk -Sailing -Attend one of their numerous festivals like the Newport Folk Festival
