= Valley Falls Yard =

Rail yard in Rhode Island

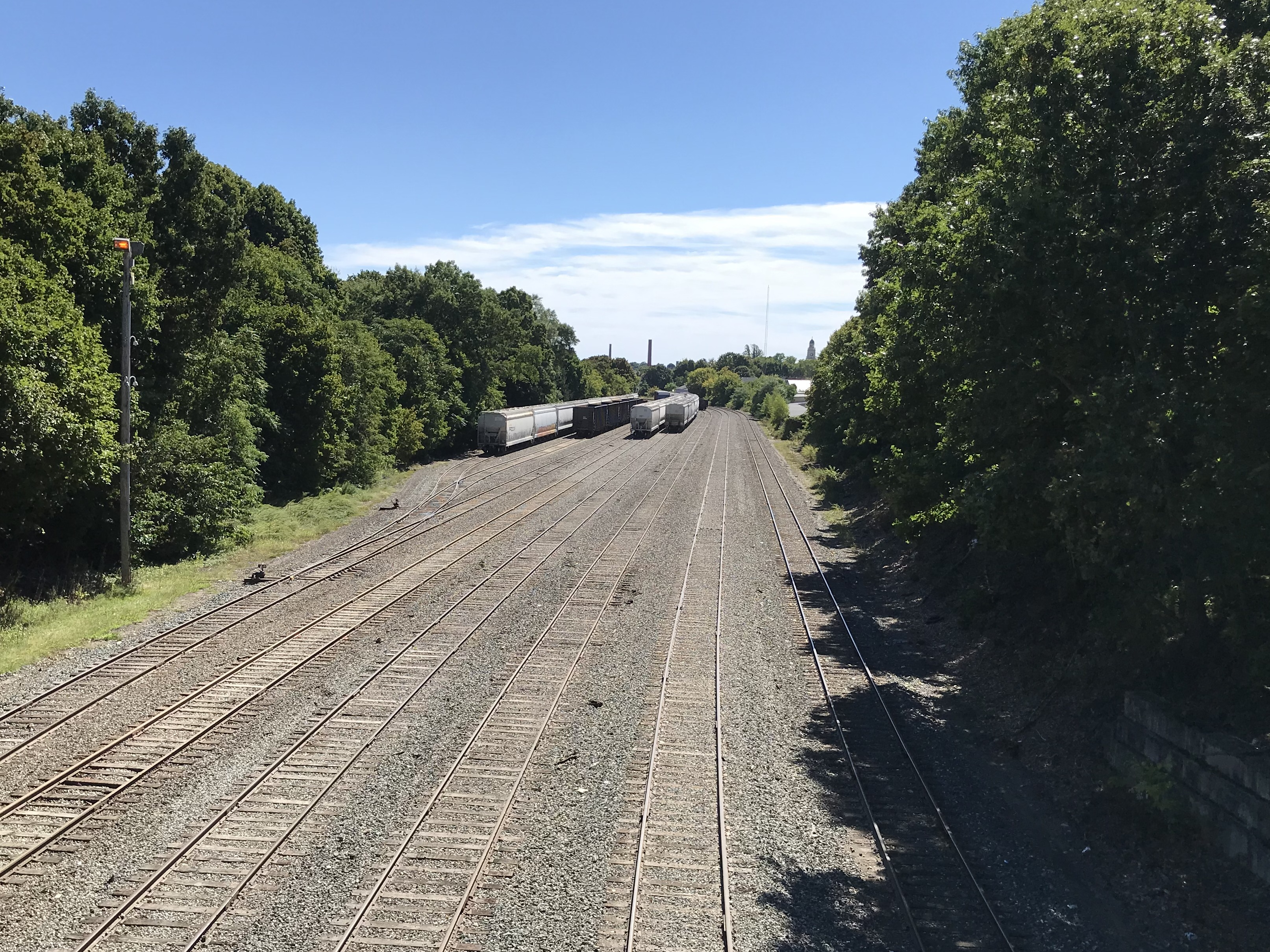
Valley Falls Yard in 2022

Valley Falls Yard is a railroad classification yard located in Valley Falls, Rhode Island. It was originally built by the Providence and Worcester Railroad (P&W) around 1860. In 1874, the P&W completed the East Providence Branch, which joined the P&W mainline near the yard. Around the same time, the Rhode Island Horse Shoe Works completed a factory in the area of the yard, which became a significant location for freight train traffic on the P&W system. The Rhode Island and Massachusetts Railroad (the Valley Falls Branch) provided a direct connection to the yard from the Norfolk County Railroad mainline in Franklin, Massachusetts. The Wrentham Branch later connected with the RI&M line, allowing further through services. From 1878 to 1884, a full suite of repair and maintenance facilities were built at Valley Falls Yard. By 1905, Valley Falls Yard included 13 tracks and was 2,000 feet in length; a new interlocking tower was completed to control the switches between the P&W mainline, the East Providence Branch, the Wrentham branch (formerly the New York and New England Railroad), and the Rhode Island and Massachusetts Railroad.

In 1913, the New York, New Haven and Hartford Railroad (the New Haven) employed approximately 300 people at Valley Falls.

Improvements and upgrades were made to the yard in 1976 as part of a New England Regional Commission program to create jobs and improve railroads.

The Providence and Worcester Railroad took over its railroad in 1973, and has operated Valley Falls Yard since. It is the base for all local freight trains operated by P&W in Rhode Island. By 1995, the P&W was operating trains PR-2 and PR-3 from the yard five days per week to serve customers along the Northeast Corridor.
