= South Bay =

South Bay may refer to:

== Antarctica ==
- South Bay (Doumer Island)
- South Bay (Livingston Island)
- South Bay (Ross Island)

== Canada ==
- South Bay (Nunavut)
- South Bay, New Brunswick
- South Bay, Ontario

== Hong Kong ==
- South Bay, Hong Kong, on Hong Kong Island
- Nam Wan ("South Bay"), on Tsing Yi Island, New Territories
- Tai Nam Wan ("Great South Bay"), on Tsing Yi Island, New Territories

== Macau ==
- Nam Van ("South Bay"), on the Macau Peninsula, a former bay turned into an artificial lake

== Taiwan ==
- South Bay (Taiwan) on Henchun Township, Pingtung County

== United States ==
=== California ===
- South Bay (San Francisco Bay Area), a region in northern California, referring to Santa Clara County
- South Bay (Los Angeles County), a region in southern California
- South Bay (San Diego County), another region in southern California
- South Bay (now Fields Landing, California), a census-designated place in Humboldt County

=== Florida ===
- South Bay, Florida, a city

=== Massachusetts ===
- South Bay Interchange, Boston, a cancelled development
- South Bay, Dorchester, Boston, Massachusetts

=== New York ===
- South Bay, New York
- Great South Bay, on Long Island
- Lower South Bay, New York, also called South Bay

=== Texas ===
- South Bay (Texas), a bay in the Laguna Madre
