= India Point Railroad Bridge =

Bridge in Rhode Island, U.S.

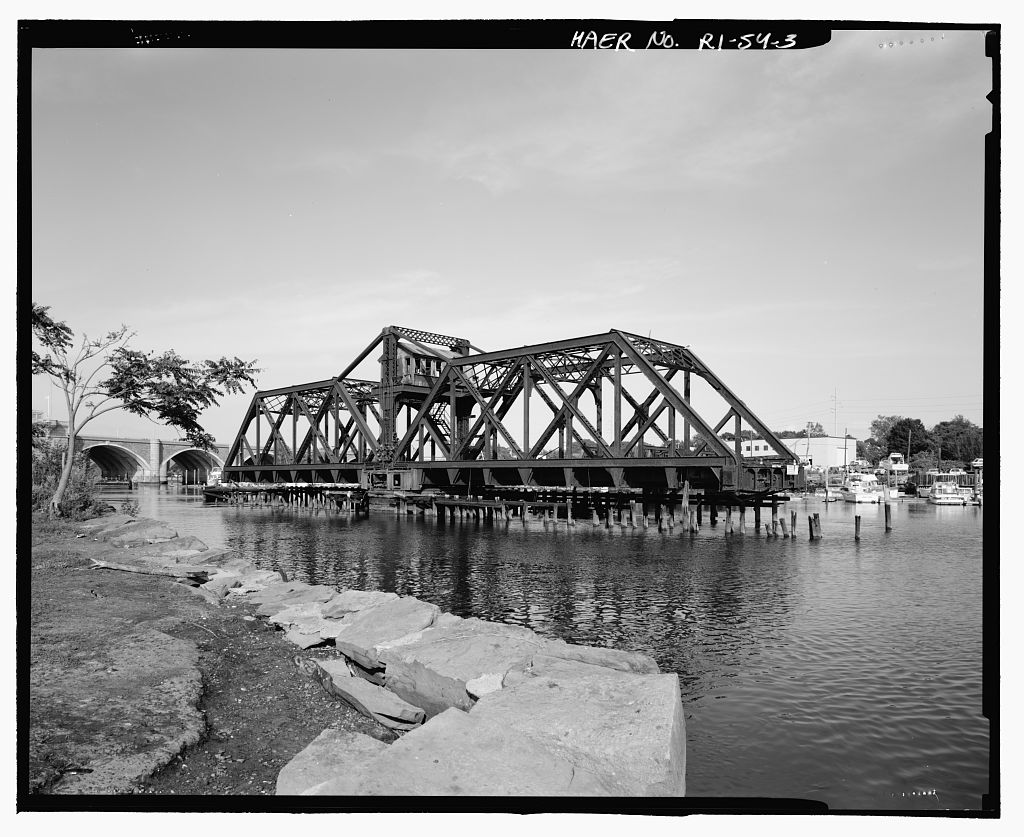
- View of swing span from India Point Park looking towards East Providence (1997)
- Coordinates: 41.817098°N 71.387415°W
- Carries: Boston and Providence Railroad
- Crosses: Seekonk River
- Locale: between Providence and East Providence

Characteristics
- Design: Swing bridge
- Total length: 403 feet (123 m)
- Width: 29 feet (8.8 m)
- Height: 48 feet (15 m)
- Longest span: 225 feet (69 m)

History
- Construction start: 1901
- Construction end: 1903
- Opened: 1903
- Closed: 1974

Location
- Interactive map of India Point Railroad Bridge

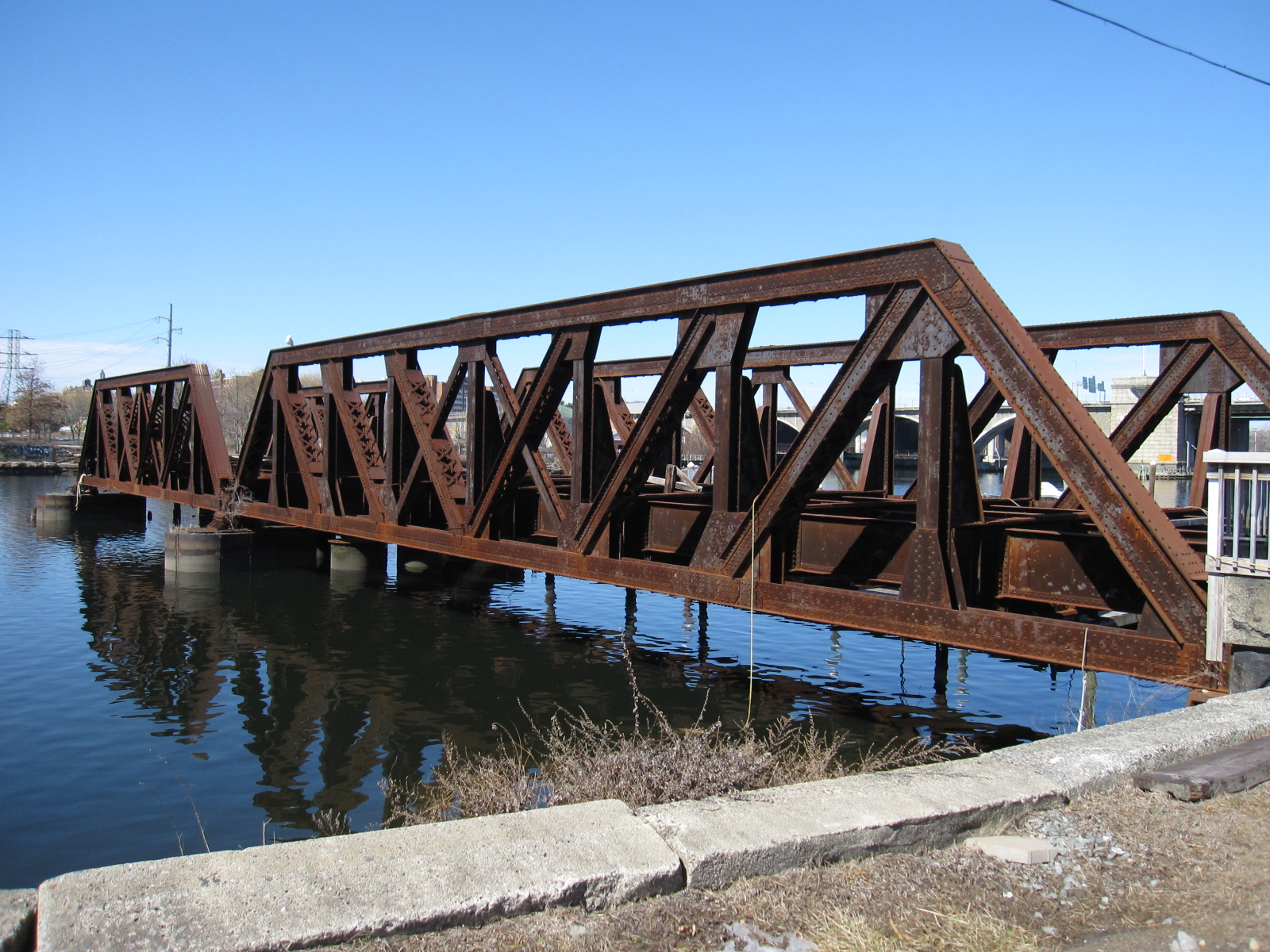
Remaining trusses in 2014

India Point Railroad Bridge was a swing bridge which spanned the Seekonk River, connecting the City of Providence, Rhode Island at India Point to the City of East Providence at Watchemoket. It was last used in 1974, and the swing span was removed in 2001 leaving only two fixed truss spans. The remaining spans were ultimately removed in 2023.

== History ==
The original structure was a covered bridge built in 1835 by Thomas Hassard for the Boston and Providence Railroad. He had been mentored by Colonel Stephen H. Long, inventor of the Long truss. It was the first interstate railroad bridge built in the United States. (Note: The area which was ceded to Rhode Island to become East Providence in 1862 was previously part of Seekonk, Massachusetts.) The bridge had a manually operated draw consisting of two parts located on the East Providence side of the bridge. In order to let a vessel pass, the eastern part had to be moved northward and the western part was moved into the vacated space. This draw was replaced in 1858 by one resting on a turntable providing a gap of 38 feet (12 m). In 1866, due to the bridge's piers being deemed unreliable, work began on a new bridge adjacent to the existing one that was to have a draw of at least 60 feet (18 m). This bridge used a Howe truss and was built by Daniel Harris and Richard Hawkins, who held the patent rights for this design in Southern New England. On 20 February 1868, a successful test run was made, and the main track was connected to the new bridge the following day.

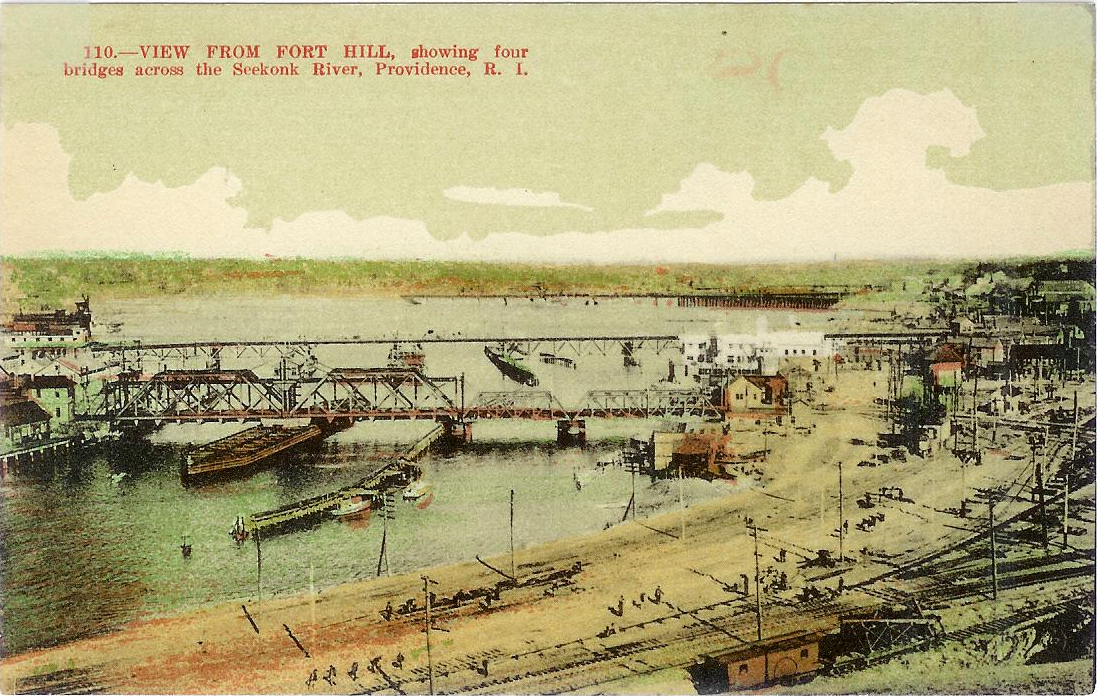
Looking north up the Seekonk River from East Providence, the 1903 bridge with its curved channel approach is in the foreground

In 1882, an iron swing section replaced the manually operated one. This provided a channel of about 38 feet (12 m). However, a curve in the channel made passage through it difficult. The remaining covered part of the bridge was replaced with a steel swing span in 1902 by Boston Bridge Works giving it a channel of approximately 80 feet (24 m) and aligning the draw with that of the 1885 Washington Bridge (Note: At the time, the bridge was known as the "Seekonk River Bridge" but was eventually renamed to match its predecessors.) to the north. Finally, the iron swing section was replaced with fixed pony trusses in 1903. Both of these sections were built around the existing spans, so that rail and water traffic would not be interrupted. During peak working hours, trains could cross the bridge at an average rate of one every four minutes.

== Removal ==
The bridge continued to operate until 1974. After its closing, the United States Coast Guard eventually determined the bridge to be a navigational hazard. In May 1990, they threatened to fine the City of Providence US$1000 for each day beyond one year from then that the bridge was neither removed nor illuminated. Though the deadline passed, the Coast Guard delayed imposing any fines until at least 1993, when Federal money was to be made available for the bridge's removal. Under the plan, the Federal government and city were each to pay US$250,000 towards the cost of removing it. However, this plan was not executed. Also, the Water Resources Acts of 1986 and 1996 had each approved plans for removing the bridge, but these plans failed to come to fruition as well.

On 18 December 2000, the Providence City Council approved the transfer of the bridge to the Federal Government. The United States Army Corps of Engineers then advertised to give the bridge to any organization that could demonstrate a suitable disposition for it. No claims were received, so demolition was scheduled to begin in October 2001. By then, the estimated removal cost had increased to US$668,690 which also had been agreed to be split evenly by the Army Corps and the city. At the end of December 2001, the swing span had been dismantled. The final step was to remove the concrete platform measuring 34 feet (10 m) in diameter that supported the swing section. As of February 2020, only the two fixed truss sections on the East Providence side remained. However, in the summer of 2019, the East Providence City Council had passed a resolution asking for federal help in removing these remaining sections. The Army Corps of Engineers responded by saying there is money in the fiscal year 2020 budget for an environmental review and design to remove it but not for the actual demolition costs.

Removal of the remainder of the bridge began in March 2023. The spans were removed and sent to a scrapyard at the Port of Providence for scrapping the following month.

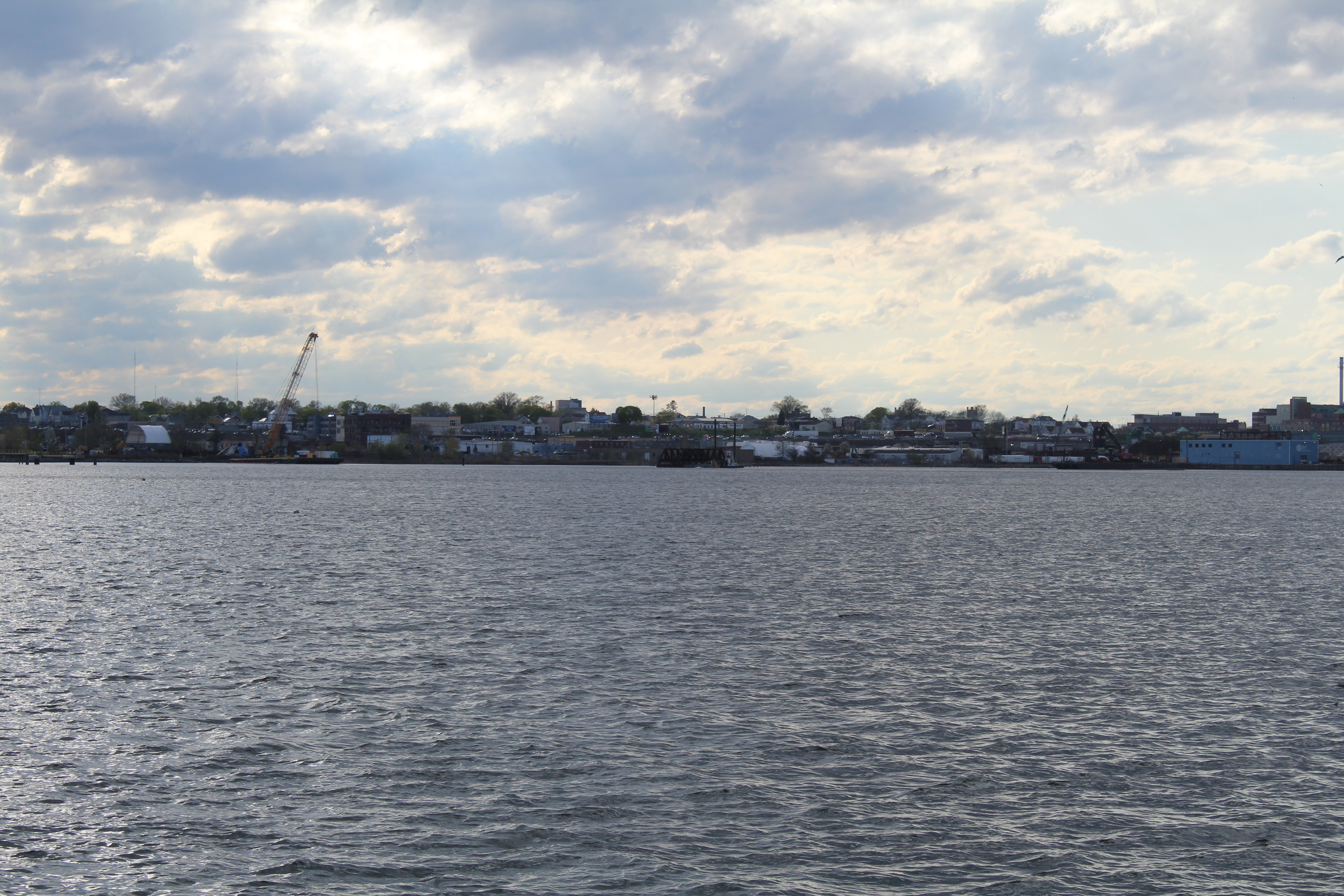
One of the former truss sections heading for scrapping on April 18, 2023

== See also ==
- Crook Point Bascule Bridge
- List of bridges documented by the Historic American Engineering Record in Rhode Island
- Sakonnet River rail bridge
