= East Side Railroad Tunnel =

Former railroad tunnel in Rhode Island

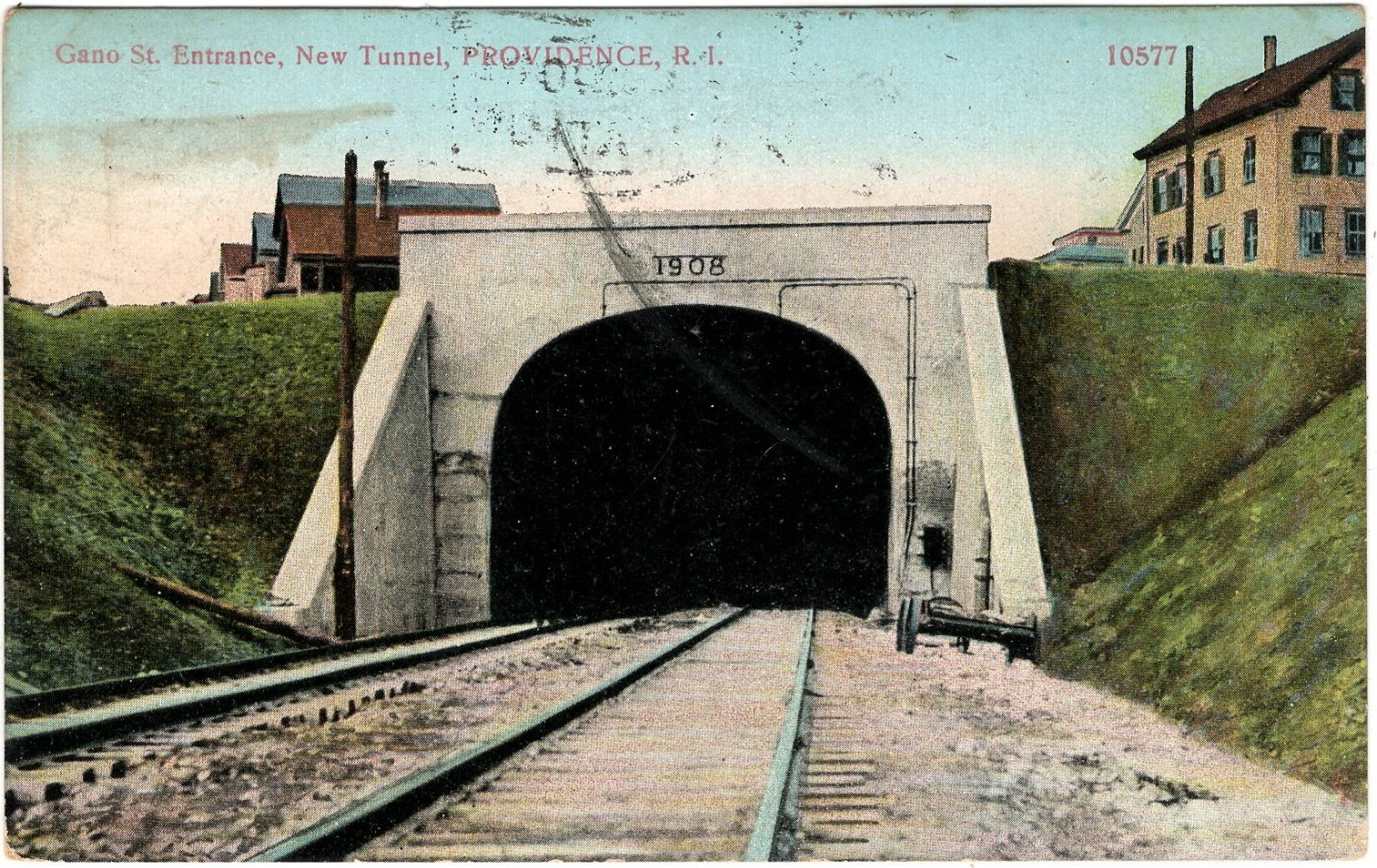
- Postcard view of the tunnel's east portal
- Interactive map of East Side Railroad Tunnel

Overview
- Location: Providence, Rhode Island, US
- Start: Gano Street
- End: North Main Street

Operation
- Opened: 1908
- Closed: 1976
- Owner: RIDOT
- Operator: New York, New Haven and Hartford Railroad, Penn Central, Conrail, Providence and Worcester Railroad

Technical
- Length: 5,080 feet (1,550 m)
- Tunnel clearance: 22 feet (6.7 m)
- Width: 31 feet (9.4 m)

The East Side Railroad Tunnel is a former railroad tunnel that runs underneath the East Side of Providence, Rhode Island. The tunnel runs 5,080 feet (1,550 m), under College Hill, from Gano Street to just west of Benefit Street. It was opened on November 16, 1908, at a cost of $2 million. All rail service ceased through the tunnel in 1976 and has been abandoned since.

== History ==
=== Construction ===
Prior to the opening of the East Side Railroad Tunnel in 1908, there was no direct connection between Providence Union Station and the railroad lines on the eastern bank of the Seekonk River – the East Junction Branch, East Providence Branch, and Providence, Warren and Bristol Railroad. Service on those lines crossed the India Point Railroad Bridge and terminated at Fox Point, south of downtown Providence. During the late nineteenth-century, the Old Colony Railroad made attempts to run full-size freight cars over surface streetcar tracks from India Point to Union Station; however, this resulted in frequent derailments. This issue prompted the need for both a bridge span over the Seekonk River along with a mile-long tunnel under Providence's east side to allow for more direct travel for both freight and passenger service around the Providence metro area.

The New York, New Haven and Hartford Railroad acquired the Old Colony Lines in 1883; this initiated renewed interest in constructing an east-side access corridor to Union Station. The East-Side Tunnel was first envisioned in 1903 as a more direct connection between the old Union Station in the center of Providence with the New Haven-acquired railroad lines east of the Seekonk River. Construction on the tunnel started in May 1906; one crew worked east from the Benefit Street entrance and one worked west from the Gano Street entrance. The tunnel was opened for NYNH&H regional rail services on November 15, 1908.

The project also included the Crook Point Bascule Bridge over the Seekonk River and a downtown Providence rail viaduct. The entire cost of the project, including the bridge, the tunnel, and the approach to Union Station, was $2 million. The east portal was located on the east side of Gano Street; the west portal was located between North Main Street and Benefit Street.

=== Operation ===
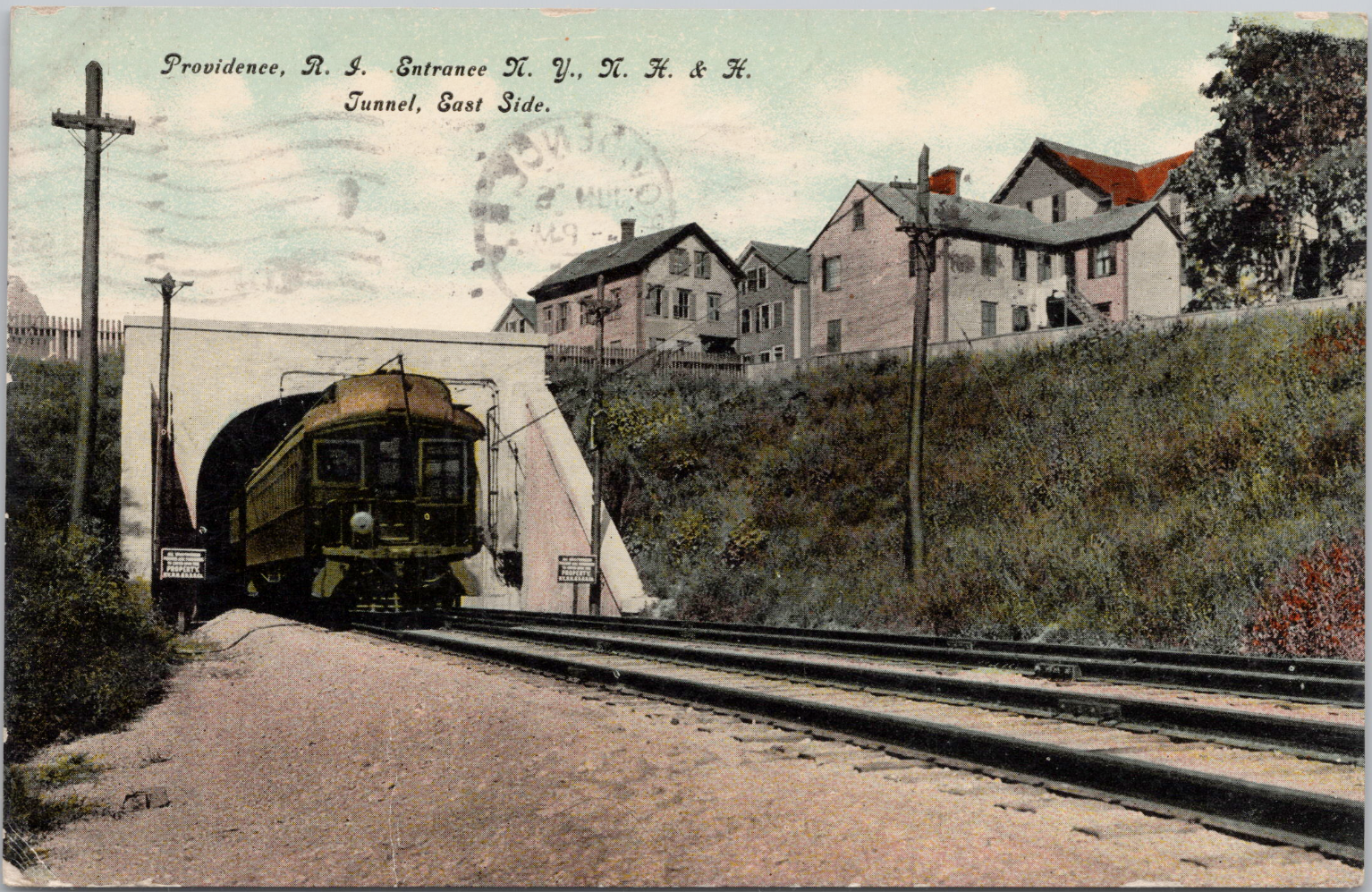
Postcard of a passenger train using the tunnel

The tunnel had originally opened with full double-tracked mainline. Between 1908 and 1934, the tunnel was electrified with a 600 Volt DC overhead single-wire trolley system to accommodate electric passenger trains from Providence to Bristol, Rhode Island and Fall River, Massachusetts. All passenger services ceased in 1938. For the remainder of the tunnel's service life freight trains, along with the occasional fan trips on chartered passenger trains, utilized the East-Side Tunnel southbound. Event passenger services also ran northward to the Narragansett Park horse racing track during the racing season; this service ended in the late 1960s.

NYNH&H successor Penn Central took control of the East-Side access line in 1969. In 1970, PC requested ICC permission to abandon the Bristol Secondary due to low freight demand. Conrail inherited the East Side Tunnel from PC in 1976, and further attempts were made to rail-bank the right-of-way. The newly independent Providence and Worcester Railroad (P&W) assumed operation of the line later in 1976; however, the Bristol Secondary was abandoned by the end of that year. The Crook Point Bascule bridge and the East Side Tunnel were subsequently abandoned later that year; the downtown Providence viaduct was demolished when the Northeast Corridor was re-routed to facilitate remodeling of the downtown area in Providence in the early 1980s. (The P&W continued to use the East Junction Branch and East Providence Branch to serve a scrapyard at Wilkesbarre Pier until the early 2000s.

=== 1993 incident and closure ===
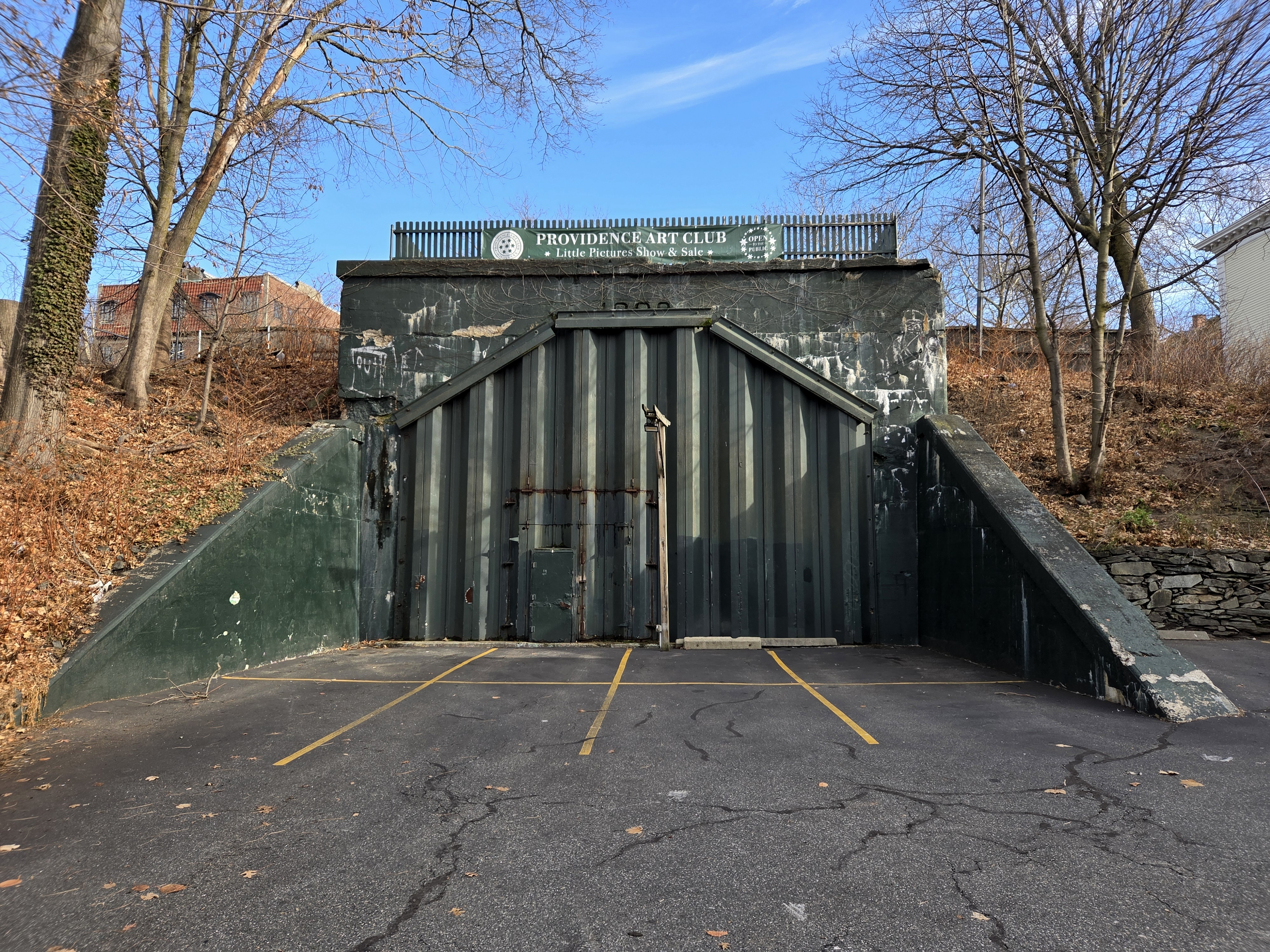
The west portal – site of the 1993 incident – seen in 2025

On May 1, 1993, a group of students gathered at the western end of the tunnel below Benefit Street to celebrate Beltain-May Day. The students started fires, wore masks and beat drums until early in the morning. Campus security tried to break up the party; the students claimed the officers had no jurisdiction in the tunnel. A fight broke out between a security officer and a student who refused to stop drumming.

City police were called and by the time they had arrived the party had grown larger. Law enforcement tried to break up the party with tear gas, but the students responded by throwing rocks and bricks. Officers finally broke up the party by forming a riot line, and surrounding the students. The following day, the police claimed that they had found signs of "satanic rituals".

The tunnel portals were soon blocked with corrugated steel, with small doors at either end. Since then, there have been sporadic attempts to re-open the site for art and performances. There have also been sporadic calls by Providence city officials to reutilize the East Side Tunnel as a light rail alignment.
