= East Side Tunnel =

East Side Tunnel may refer to two separate tunnels in Providence, Rhode Island:

- The East Side Trolley Tunnel, a tunnel undercutting College Hill, still in use today for bus routes
- The East Side Railroad Tunnel, a railroad tunnel connecting East Providence to downtown Providence, out of use since 1981
