= Washington Bridge (Providence, Rhode Island) =

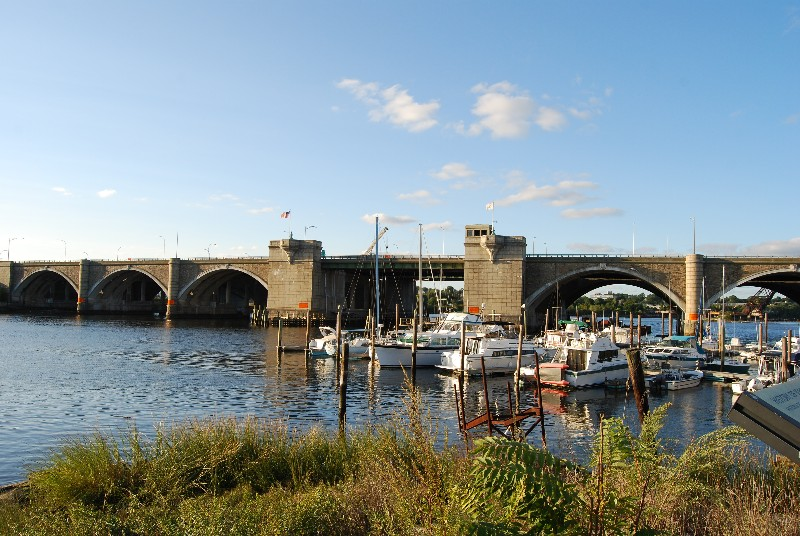
- Washington Bridge, Providence
- Coordinates: 41.819076°N 71.386993°W
- Carries: Ten lanes of I-195 / US 6 / US 44 / US 1A and 2 lanes of the East Bay Bike Path
- Crosses: Seekonk River
- Locale: Between Providence and East Providence, Rhode Island
- Owner: Rhode Island Department of Transportation
- Maintained by: Rhode Island Department of Transportation
- ID number: South span: 2000, North span: 7000

Characteristics
- Material: Steel
- Total length: South span: 1,671 feet (509 m), North span: 1,904 feet (580 m)
- Width: South span: 68 feet (21 m), North span: 61 feet (19 m)
- No. of spans: 15
- Clearance below: South span: 41 feet (12 m), North span: 42 feet (13 m)

History
- Architect: Carl L. Otto
- Engineering design by: Clarence W. Hudson
- Construction end: South span: 1930, North span: 1968, current south span: 2008
- Opened: 25 September 1930
- Rebuilt: 1998 (north span)
- Replaces: Swing bridge of the same name built in 1885

Statistics
- Toll: None

Location
- Interactive map of Washington Bridge

References
- National Bridge Inventory

The Washington Bridge carries Interstate 195 and US Routes 6, 44, and 1A over the Seekonk River, connecting India Point in Providence to Watchemoket Square in East Providence, Rhode Island. The bridge consists of three parallel spans. The oldest span dates to 1930 and now serves as a pedestrian and bicycle link to the East Bay Bike Path and is part of the Washington-Rochambeau National Historic Trail. A second span was built in 1968 and a third in 2008.

In December 2023, the 1968 span was abruptly closed due to critical safety issues. It will require complete replacement before reopening, which is expected in November 2028. In the meantime, westbound traffic shares the eastbound span.

== History ==
Prior to the construction of bridges, tidal ferries provided the only means to cross the river. Tides propelled the ferries along guide ropes anchored on both sides. However, the ferries were unable to operate during bad weather, and travelers could be stranded on each side. Replacing the ferries with bridges would be a major advance in transportation.

=== Previous bridges ===
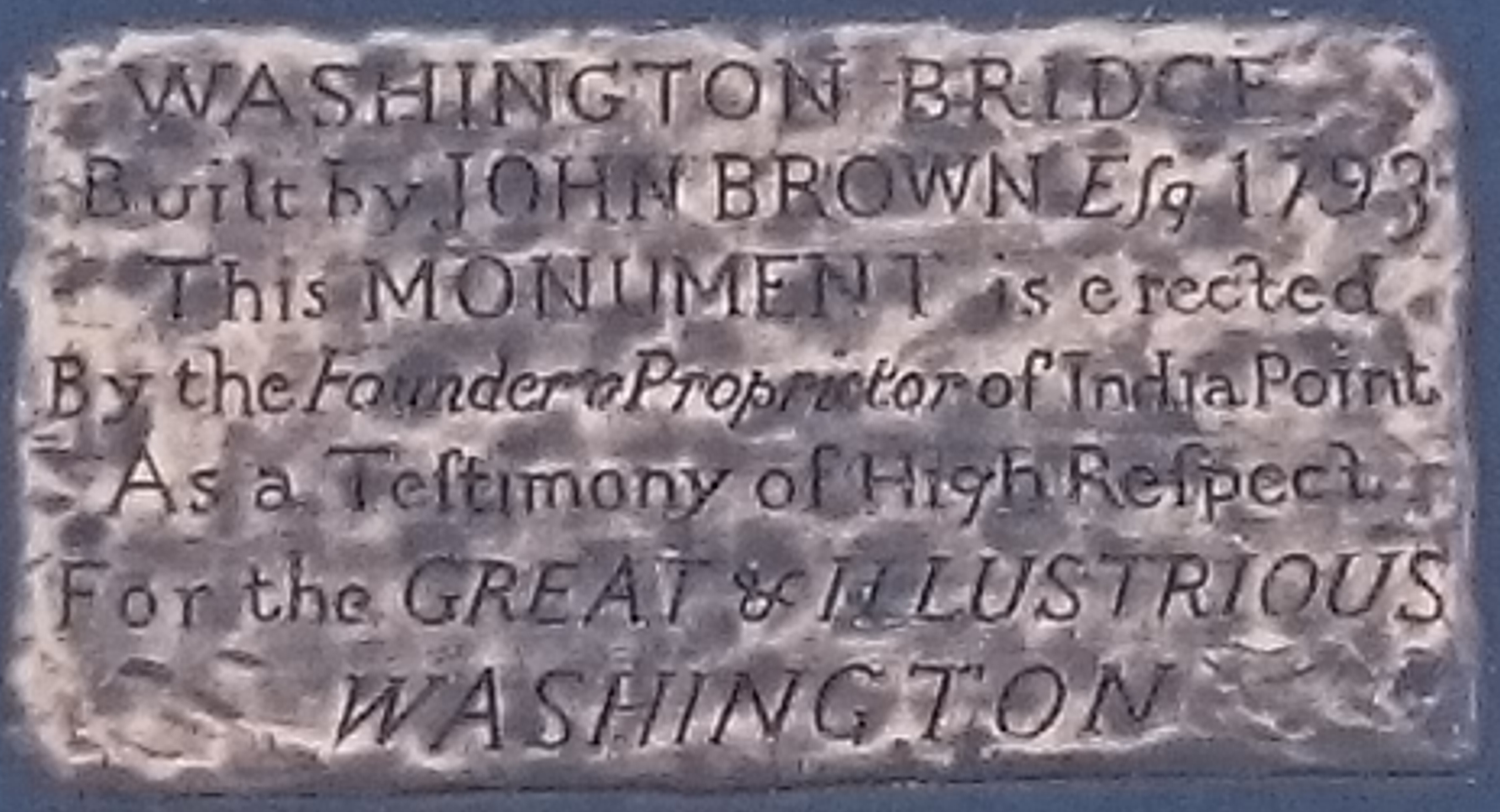
1793 Washington Bridge plaque replica

The first bridge in this general location was constructed in 1793, when John Brown's Providence South Bridge Company built a covered drawbridge. This bridge served as part of a turnpike that followed Taunton Avenue from Watchemoket Square to Taunton, Massachusetts. The same year, Brown's brother Moses built the Central Bridge (red bridge) to the north, connecting what are now the Providence and East Providence ends of Waterman Avenue. Replacements were built in 1807 and 1815 after each existing bridge was destroyed by weather. A steel truss swing bridge was then built in 1885, and carried a street car line.

=== Current spans ===
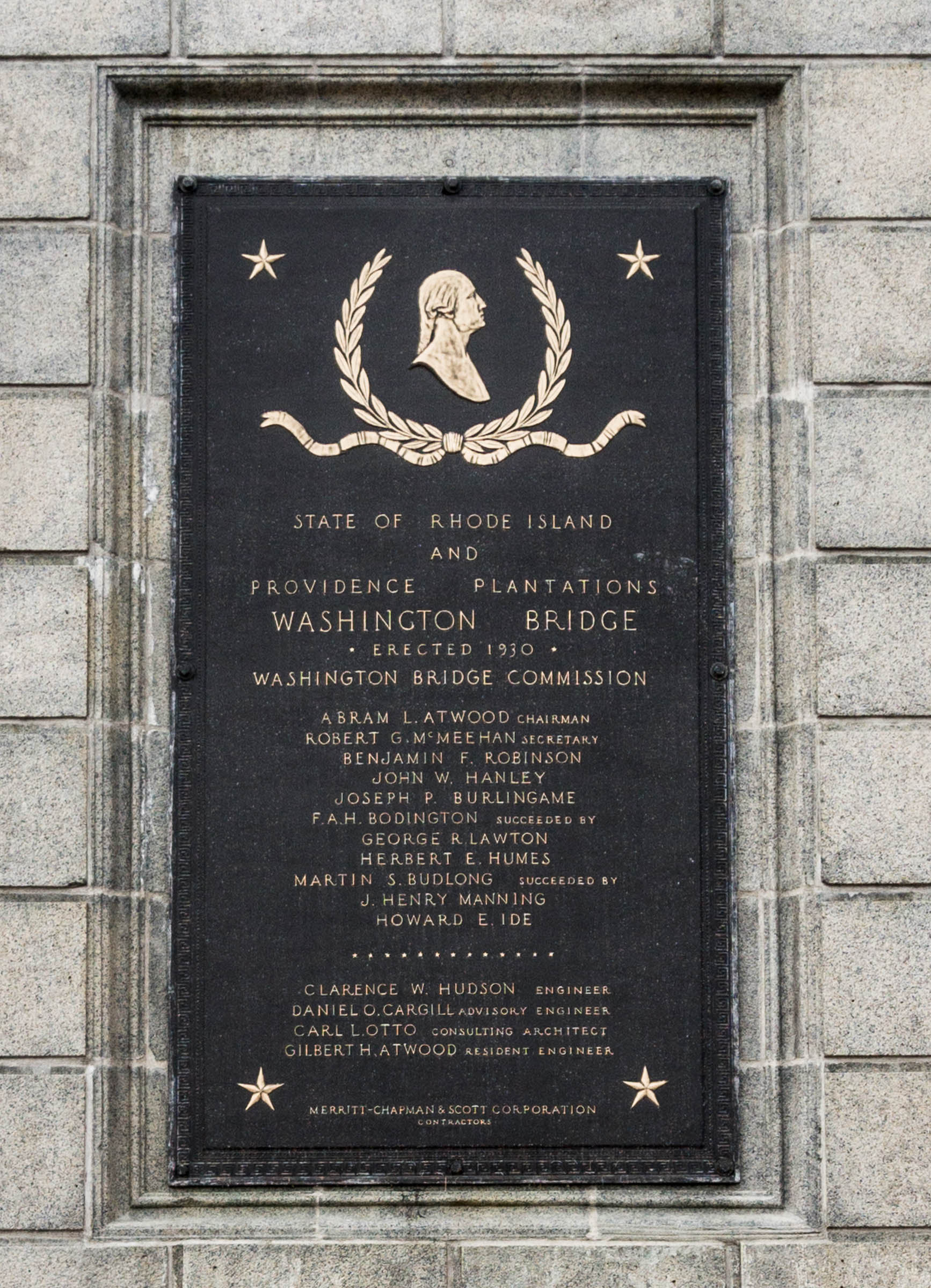
Plaque on the Washington Bridge

The original (southern) span of the current bridge, funded through an order by Frederick S. Peck, the Commissioner of Finance for Rhode Island, opened on September 25, 1930, as a bascule bridge. Designed by engineer Clarence W. Hudson and architect Carl L. Otto, both of New York City, it is dedicated to George Washington, in honor of his crossing with General Rochambeau. It linked the old Fox Point Boulevard on the Providence side with the intersection of Warren and Taunton Avenues - Watchemoket Square - both of which still terminate at the East Providence end of the bridge. The four-lane bridge, which carries two lanes in each direction, was marked by four approximately 15 ft high by 8 ft wide at the base by 3 ft deep (4.6x2.4x0.9 m) stone monuments, all having identical bronze dedications to Washington on them. The bridge structure itself, with its stone façade and arches under the roadway, is similar to the Arlington Memorial Bridge in Washington, D.C., on a shortened scale.

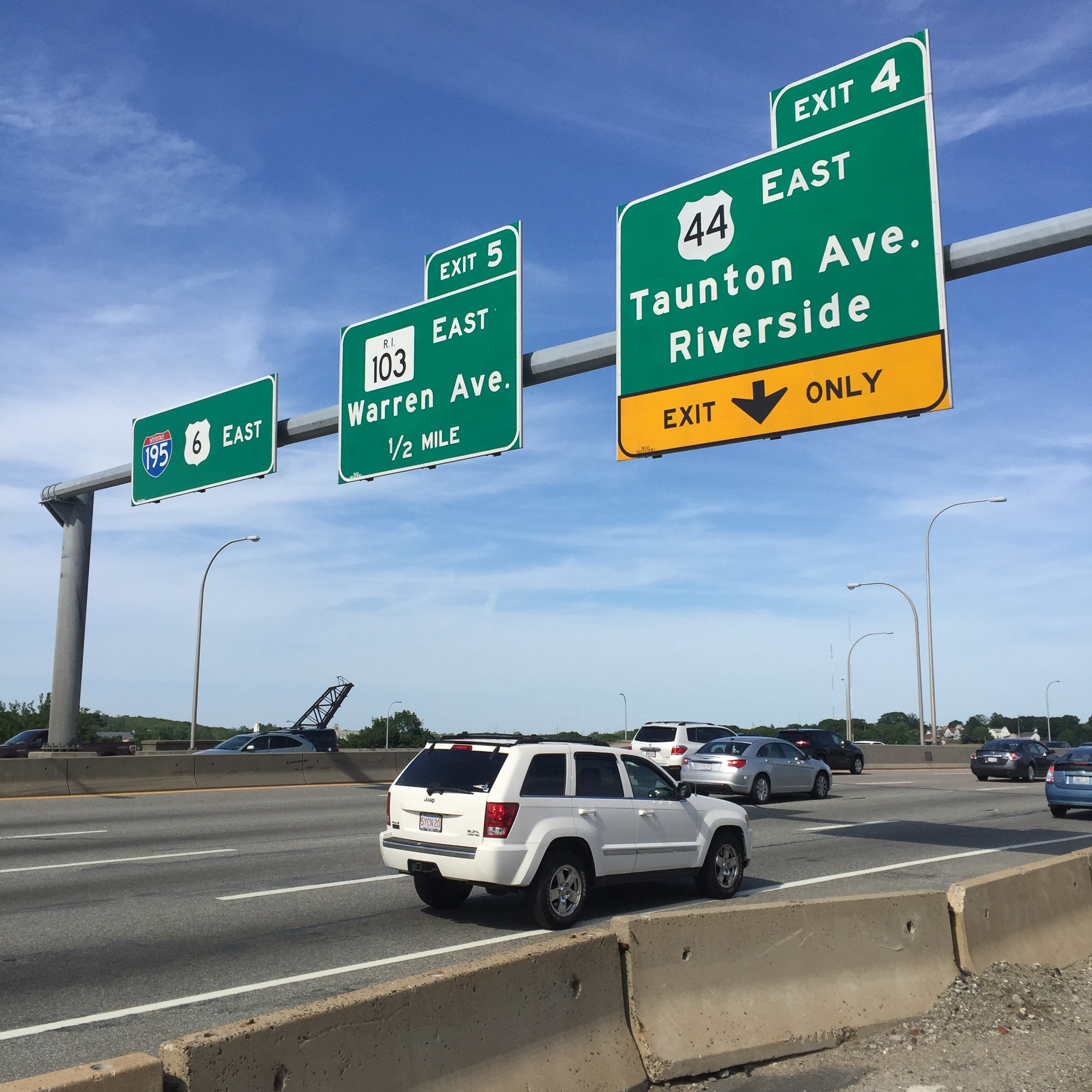
Signs for Exits 4 and 5, eastbound traffic lane.

In 1959, the span, along with the approach roads, were redesignated as part of the newly created I-195, which, by the end of the year, extended to the Massachusetts border. However, it was determined that future congestion on the bridge was far too much for its future use.

Construction on a new westbound span began in April 1967. The Federal Bureau of Public Roads wanted to build an inexpensive, plain steel bridge next to the more decorative concrete 1930s bridge. Rhode Island Public Works refused to accept a design for the new bridge that didn't harmonize with the existing structure. As a compromise, the decision was made to utilize a new construction technique: "pre-stressed concrete with false arches." This technique of pre-stressed and post-tensioned concrete spans, locked in place with steel anchors, promised the beauty of concrete at the cost of steel. Construction was completed by late 1968, and the new span opened shortly before Christmas. It was at this time that two changes were made to the original bridge; the bascule section was permanently closed, as the new westbound bridge were not designed to include bascule functions. The bridge monuments on the northern side of the bridge on each approach were relocated to the respective sides of the new western approach span. Additionally, the bridge was made exclusively for eastbound traffic, and a sidewalk was constructed on the span. The design of this span was unusual, the result of a compromise between cost and aesthetics. However, this technique never caught on with the industry, and by the 1970s was largely abandoned as a building technique. This meant that the westbound span would remain a relative rarity, a "curiosity of another era;" a fact which would come back to confound engineers a half-century later when the span was discovered to have critical failures. A 2024 report on the bridge suggested that such pre-stressed and post-tensioned concrete structures are poorly understood due to their rarity.

In 1996, both bridges were repaired. The westbound bridge had large amounts of its steel understructure replaced, which required some lanes to be closed during the entire project. The eastbound bridge was patched by closing lanes at night, cutting holes in the surface, performing repairs, and opening the lanes for the morning rush. In the early 2000s, rehabilitation had moved on to the eastbound span.

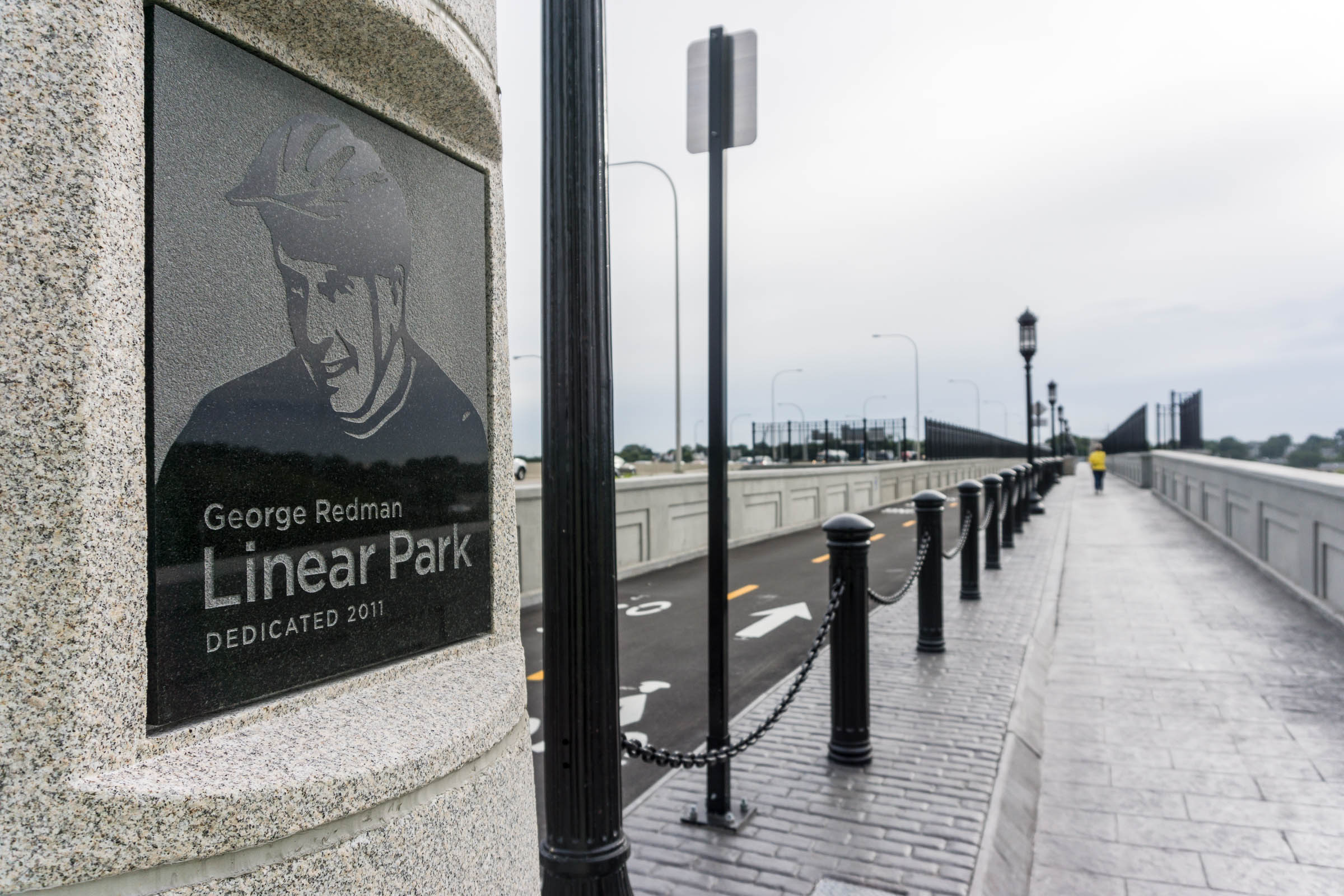
Bicycle and pedestrian traffic are separated on the George Redman Linear Park (looking east)

With experience gained from reconstructing the concrete spandrel arch span Ashton Viaduct, RIDOT opted to fully replace the portion of the 1930 bridge carrying vehicles with a new bridge. To avoid issues with obtaining new right of way, the new eastbound span was constructed starting in the gap between the two bridges, with the older bridge having its northernmost arch ribs removed to allow construction to proceed. In 2007 the pedestrian and bicycle pathway on the eastbound span was permanently closed. A new eastbound span opened in 2008. The remaining portion of the original 1930 segment is now used as the pedestrian span. That portion had closed in July 2012, as RIDOT expanded the original infrastructure into a Linear Park. Much of the repair was limited by RI State budget constraints and other cost issues related to its age and the stress of multi-regional congested traffic traveling eastward to the Seekonk/Fall River suburbs and Cape Cod. Along with the Henderson Bridge located one mile to the north, the Washington Bridge is one of two spans crossing the Seekonk River in Providence. From 2012 to 2015, a bicycle and pedestrian park was constructed on a remaining section of the original Washington Bridge. The park opened in September 2015, at a total cost of $21.8 million. The park consists of an 11-foot-wide bicycle lane, a separated footpath paved with stamped concrete, and several seating areas. The path offers scenic overlooks of the Seekonk River and Brown's boathouse. Its design includes decorative granite sections and spires, and its central section contains a plaza-like sitting area with half-circle concrete benches. The path is completely separated from I-195 automobile traffic and includes two wide bicycle lanes, and a separate wide pedestrian walkway. The linear park is named George Redman Linear Park, in honor of East Providence cyclist and park activist George Redman, who died in 2012 at age 88. A plaque honoring Redman can be seen on the west end of the park.

$25 million in federal funding was allocated in 2020 for a now-estimated $78 million rehabilitation of the westbound structure. The actual repairs were delayed by lawsuits from all the contractors that submitted bids; one contractor was disqualified and the bidding process restarted.

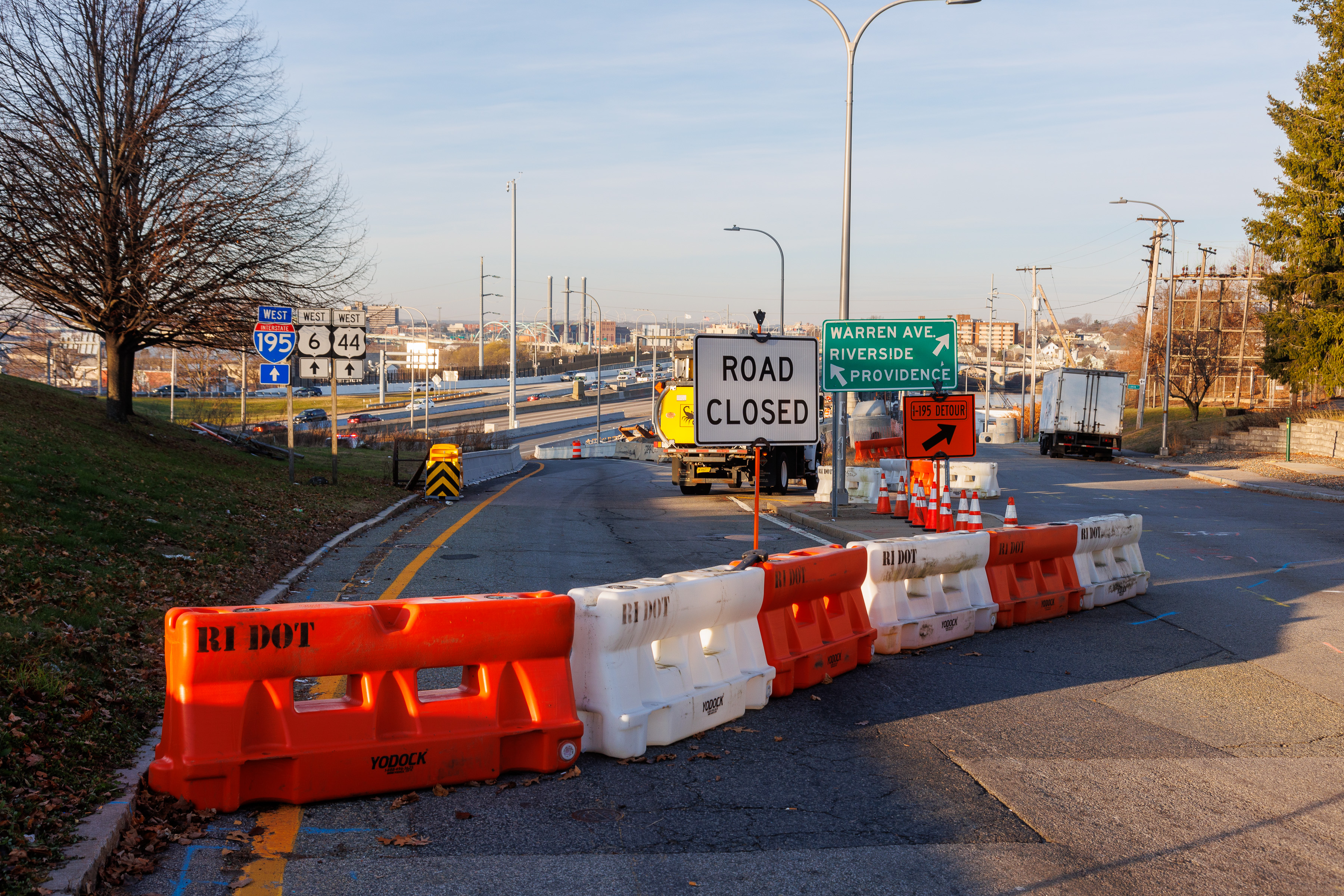
Westbound I-195 entrance ramp in East Providence closed due to bridge closure

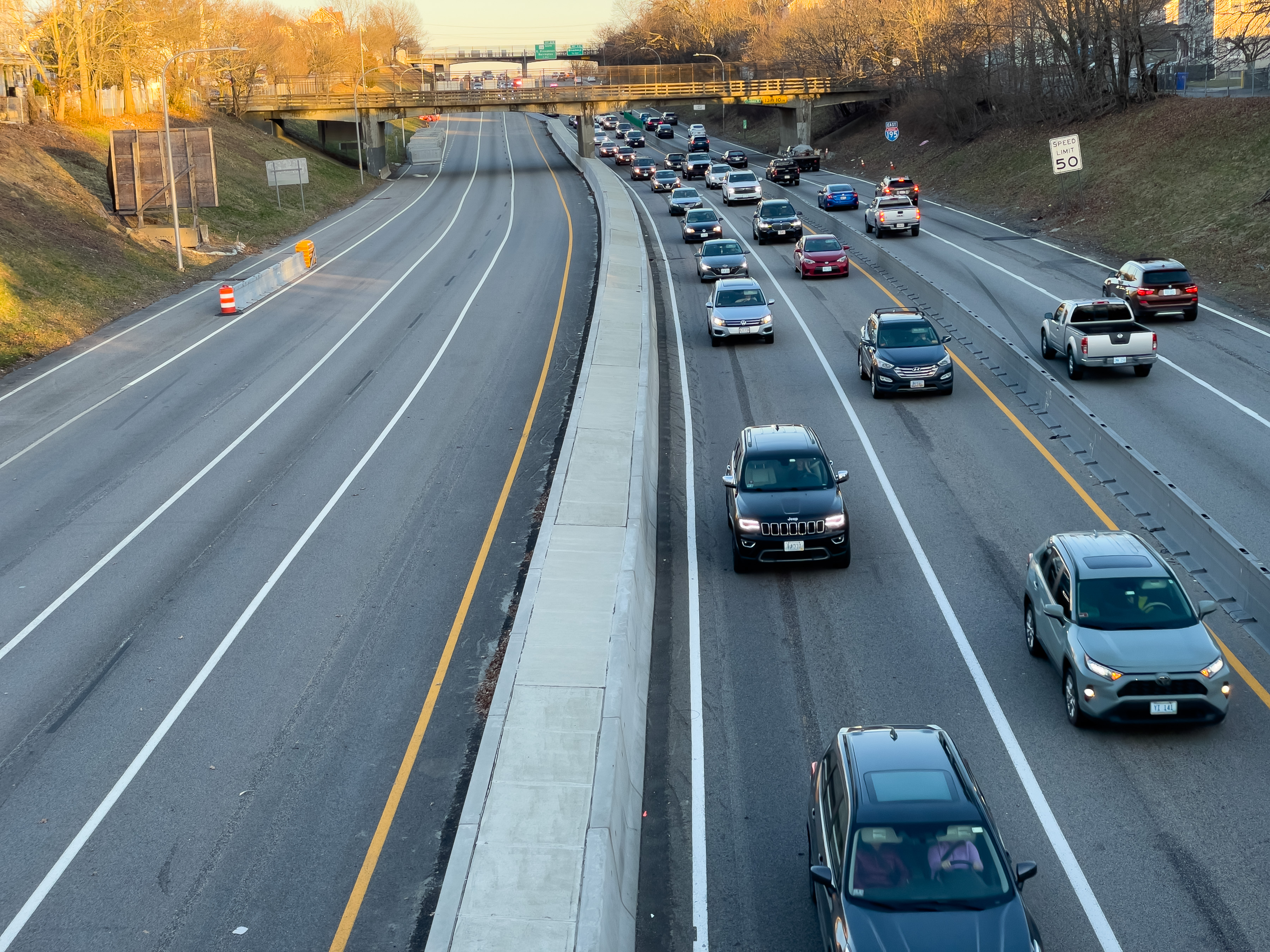
Westbound traffic is re-routed onto the eastbound lanes on I-195 in East Providence, approaching the bridge.

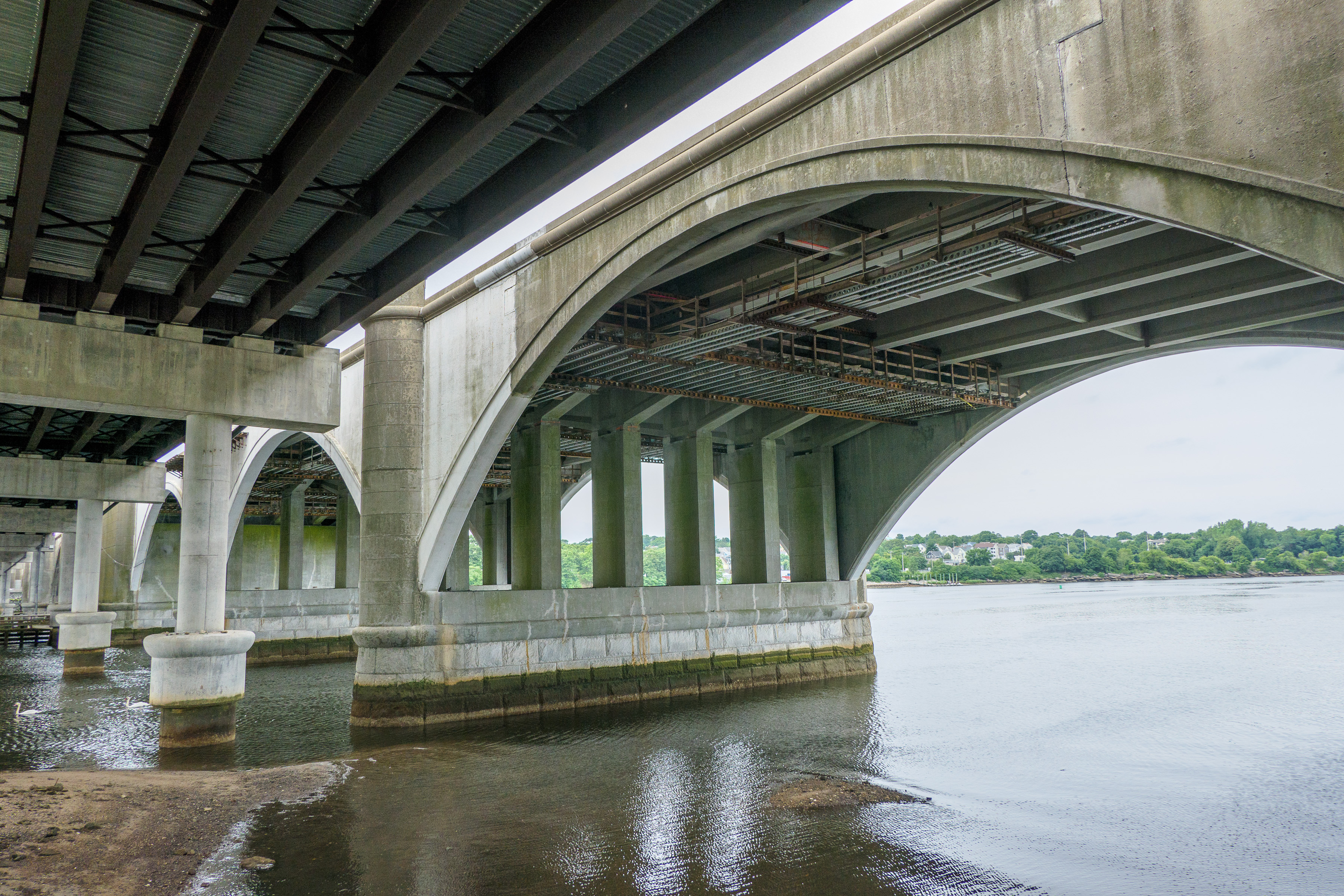
A view under the closed span

The westbound span of the Washington Bridge was suddenly closed on Monday, December 11, 2023, after the Rhode Island Department of Transportation announced the discovery of "critical failure of some original bridge components". Westbound traffic was initially detoured on an alternate route through East Providence and onto the newly reopened Henderson Bridge before rejoining with Interstate 195 via the Gano Street exit. The span had been carrying about 90,000 cars per day. Extreme volume along the detour route slowed typical trips across the river from a few minutes to over an hour; I-195 backups into Massachusetts during rush hour became common occurrences. East Providence schools were forced to indefinitely switch to an early-dismissal schedule, with remote learning only on the Wednesday after the closure. State police were instructed to allow ambulances to cross one lane of the westbound bridge starting Tuesday, to maintain access to local hospitals; Rhode Island Hospital is the only Level-1 trauma center for Rhode Island and southeastern Massachusetts. The "critical failure" was sheared pins noticed several days prior by an engineer working on old eastbound deck demolition for Vanasse Hangen Brustlin, Inc. The pins had been intact as of the last inspection in July 2023, but the newly discovered damage put the bridge in danger of collapse. At 1 AM on Friday, December 15, two temporary westbound lanes opened using the eastbound structure, substantially reducing delays but leaving the highway with reduced capacity in both directions, a process that had originally been expected to take two to three weeks. A 500-person ferry was planned to start trips from 6am to 7pm every half hour on Monday, December 18, between India Point and Bristol. RIPTA shuttle buses were planned to bring westbound passengers to bus and train connections at Kennedy Plaza and Providence station, respectively, with a shuttle to a park-and-ride lot in Colt State Park in Bristol. RIDOT's initial estimate for permanent westbound repairs was three months, depending on weather and other factors. Local TV station WPRI has since reported that it will take longer than three months (but did not report the time estimated to complete work); WPRI also reported that the Bristol-Providence ferry will stop service after January 19, 2024. On March 14, 2024, Rhode Island Governor Dan McKee announced that the structure was not repairable, and would require demolition and complete replacement, a process estimated to take at least two years and cost around $300 million.

On August 16, 2024, Rhode Island sued thirteen companies for negligence, breach of contract and breach of fiduciary duties (among other claims) due to allegedly flawed design, inspection and maintenance activities involving the Washington Bridge.

As of October 17, 2024 it was reported that "[o]fficials have already acknowledged the $368 million price tag attached to the bridge rebuild in May is outdated and may be too low now. Under the most recently-revised state timeline, bridge demolition, including the beams and piers below the thoroughfare, were supposed be completed by December 2025."

A delay was caused by a significant incident during demolition work on January 31, 2025, when the contractor demolishing the bridge lost control of major pieces of the bridge, causing the sinking of one of the barges and another to list significantly.

As of June 2025, demolition and reconstruction is expected to cost $570 million. The construction contract targets November 3, 2028, with incentives for early opening and daily penalties for delays. The bridge will have an additional lane, artistic lighting, a new on-ramp from Gano Street in Providence, and a new off-ramp to Waterfront Drive in East Providence. To make future maintenance easier, the bridge will be 450 feet shorter and have more accessible critical components.

== See also ==
- Henderson Bridge
- Crook Point Bascule Bridge
