= Green Jacket Shoal =

Shoal and ship graveyard off Providence, Rhode Island

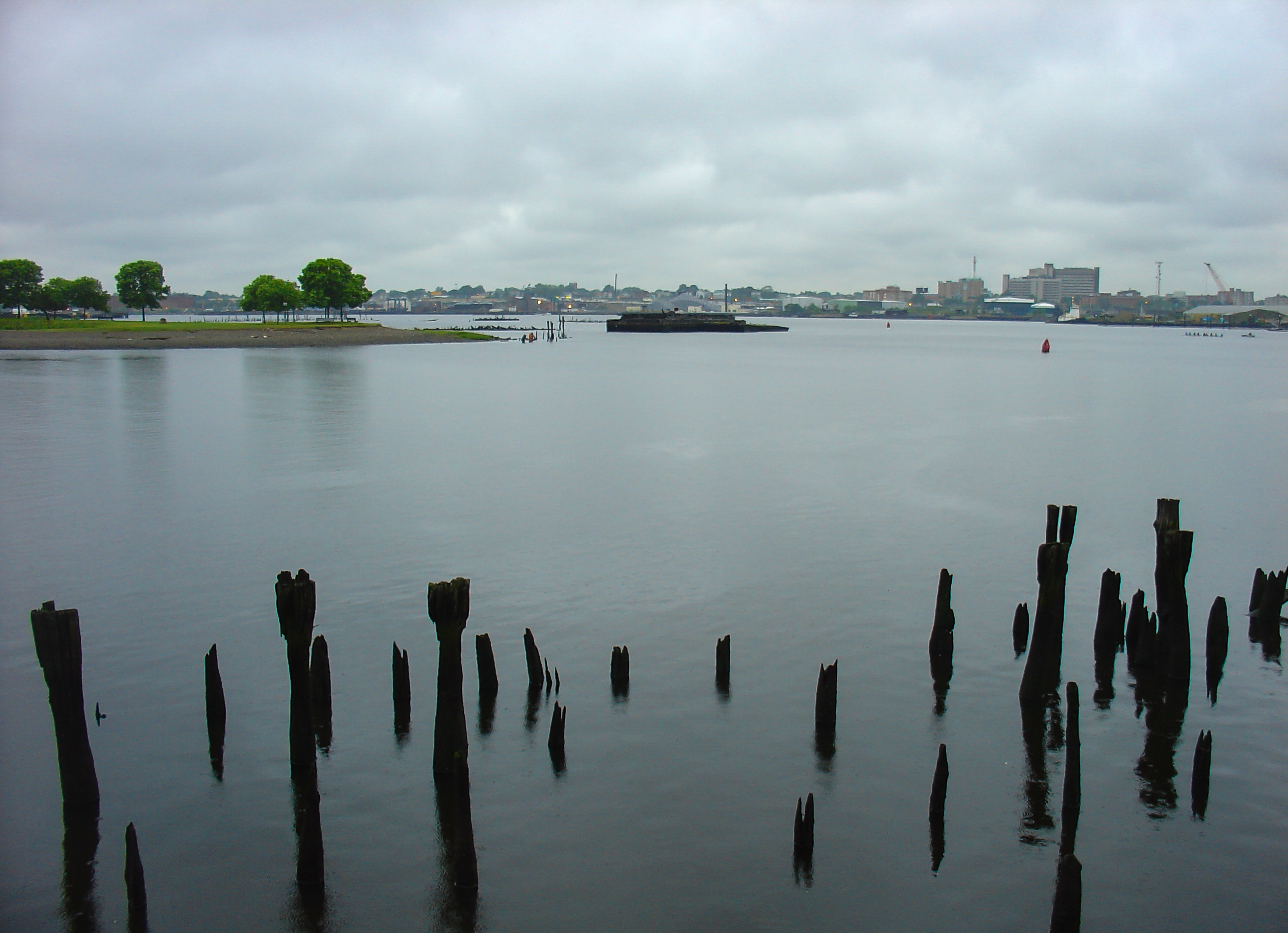
- Green Jacket Shoal in 2017, viewed from India Point Park, facing Bold Point Park and the Providence River.

- Location within Rhode Island
- Location: Providence, Rhode Island; East Providence, Rhode Island, United States
- Coordinates: 41°48′53″N 71°23′41″W
- Type: Shoal
- Part of: Providence Harbor
- Primary inflows: Providence River
- Primary outflows: Seekonk River
- Surface area: 33 acres (13 ha)

Green Jacket Shoal is a 33-acre (13 ha) shoal and ship graveyard in Providence River, between the cities of East Providence and Providence, Rhode Island, United States. It contains a large amount of debris from a century of abandoned and wrecked ships, destroyed docks, pilings, and other remnants of the area's industrial past. India Point, on the Providence side, was the city's first port, which remained active from 1680 until the Great Depression in the early 20th century. Bold Point, on the East Providence side, was home to a dry dock and other maritime businesses.

India Point and Bold Point were later turned into parks. Due to the dangers posed by the debris, as well as the changing character of the cities and increased public recreational use of the parks, a cleanup effort began in 2015 with federal, state, and non-governmental funding. An analysis of the shoal conducted before a cleanup found it to be Rhode Island's largest ship graveyard, with 29 separate vessels having accumulated over the years. The discovery has led marine archaeologists to call for the area's protection as a cultural heritage site.

== Geography ==
Green Jacket Shoal is a 33-acre area of the Providence River in Providence Harbor. It sits between the Fox Point neighborhood of Providence on the north and northwest and the Riverside section of East Providence to the east and southeast. The Seekonk River, a tidal extension of the Providence River, continues to the northeast, and is flanked by India Point on the north side and Bold Point on the south side.

== History ==
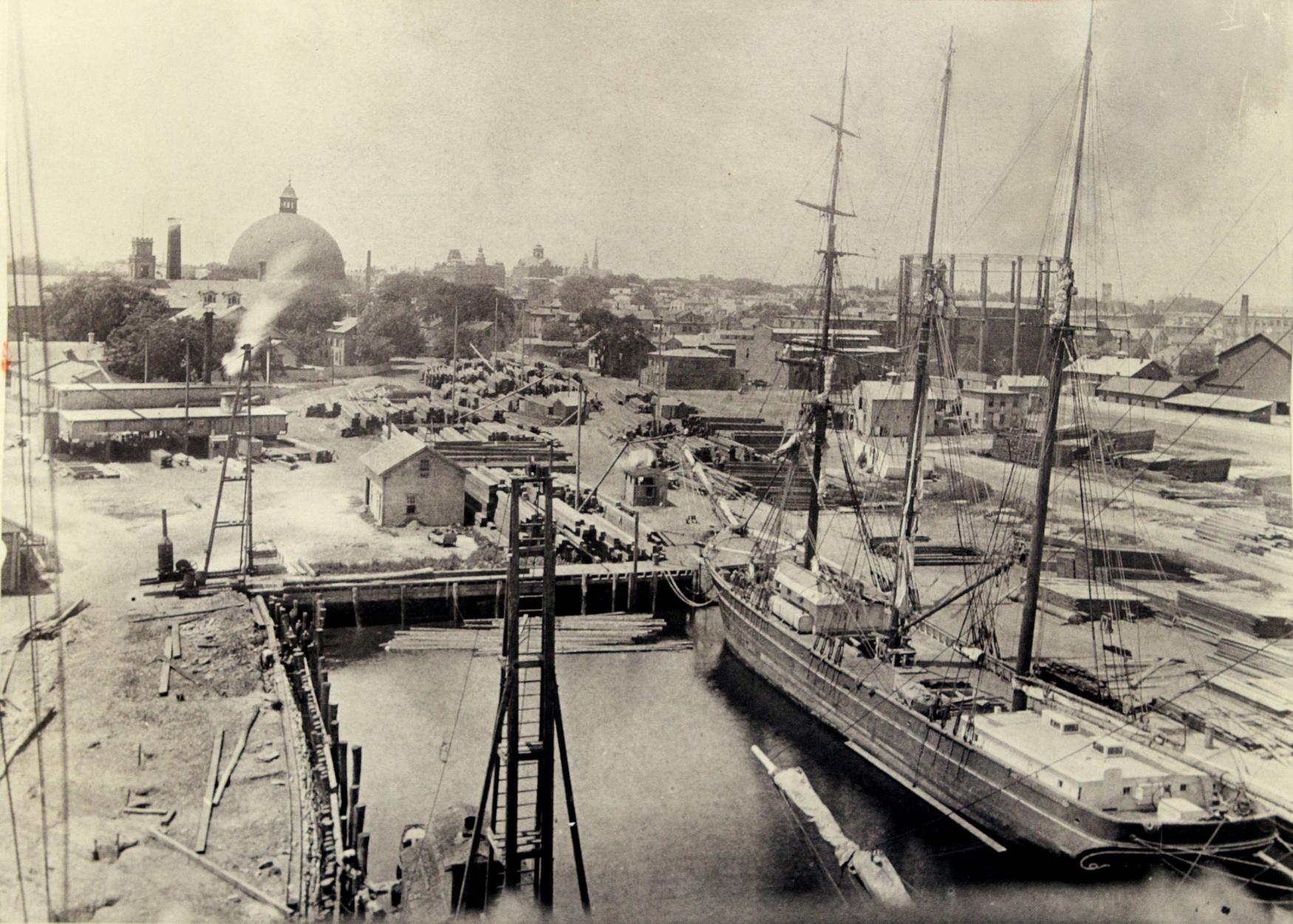
Providence Dry Dock and Marine Company at Bold Point circa 1910

Location of Green Jacket Shoal between Providence and East Providence

Green Jacket Shoal has been an important part of the Providence waterfront since the city's first port was established in 1680 at India Point. India Point, on the Providence side, was a busy and prosperous waterfront area, taking its name from its trade connections with the East and West Indies. Its success was in part due to the large trading businesses of John Brown and his partner, John Francis, who set up in Providence in 1787. Brown, the namesake of Brown University, was active in the slave trade. He, his brother, his sons, and others in his family line brought slave ships to Providence as part of the Atlantic triangle trade. In the late 1800s, the steamships that regularly came through the shoal to India Point carried immigrants to Rhode Island from Ireland, Cape Verde, the Azores, and Portugal.

Bold Point, on the East Providence side of the shoal, was home to maritime businesses including Providence Dry Dock and Marine Railway Co., which operated two patent slips and the first floating dry dock in Narragansett Bay, used to repair and maintain ships. According to The Providence Journal, from 1884 to 1919, it "was the main ship repair facility in Providence. Green Jacket Shoal was its parking lot."

Green Jacket Shoal takes its name from the thick, green eelgrass that once grew there. Moses King wrote in 1882 that the dense grass "is a source of much annoyance to the extensive shipping interests at [India Point and Bold Point], and efforts are being made to secure its removal."

India Point remained profitable into the early 1900s, but began to decline during the Great Depression. It was battered by the 1938 New England hurricane and commerce largely ceased. By the 1940s, it had turned into a scrap yard. In the 1960s and 1970s, Providence underwent a concerted beautification effort, including the transformation of India Point into a park, which opened in 1974.

The long period of neglect is still reflected in the condition of the shoal, which has accumulated a century's worth of debris. Remnants of destroyed docks, pilings, two patent slips, the dry dock, shipwrecks, abandoned ships, and other structures stick out of the water in many places around the shoal, owing to many years of natural disasters and economic hardship.

As the character of the area moved away from its industrial past, and with increased public use of the water and its surroundings via India Point Park and Bold Point Park, the detritus has come to be a noted source of urban blight and significant safety concern for anyone using the water. In 2001 the New England Division of the U.S. Army Corps of Engineers proposed filling in the area to turn it into a salt marsh. Research conducted for the proposal found "abundant" shellfish, including soft-shell clams, oysters, mussels, and periwinkles in the intertidal areas of the shoal. Years later, when it was identified as a notable ship graveyard, marine archaeologists argued for conservation of the area as a means of preserving cultural history, likening it to the preservation of landmarks and other structures on land. In 2018, the Rhode Island Coastal Resources Management Council created a Marine Protected Area to preserve the shoal, in cooperation with local historical organizations. The designation creates a restricted perimeter and authorizes state and local law enforcement to take measures to ensure the graveyard is protected.

== Ship graveyard ==
Before a major 2015 cleanup effort, the Rhode Island Sea Grant funded a study of the debris in Green Jacket Shoal. In November 2015, marine archaeologist David Robinson of the University of Rhode Island counted 26 shipwrecks, making it the state's largest ship graveyard. In 2018, he increased the number to 29 wrecks, supplementing his dives with help from local libraries and archives.

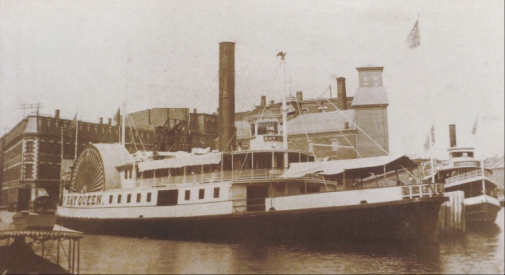
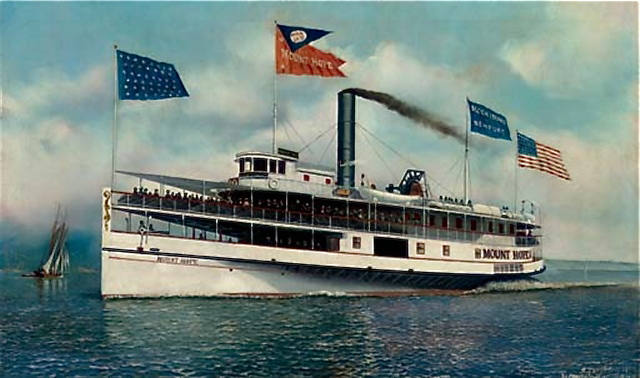
The Bay Queen (left) and Mount Hope (right), two steamships now wrecked in Green Jacket Shoal.

Two of the ships are well known sidewheeler steamboats from the late 1800s and early 1900s: the Bay Queen and the Mount Hope, passenger boats measuring 182 feet and 193 feet, respectively. The Bay Queen took people around Narragansett Bay, including to attractions like Rocky Point Park and Crescent Park. After running for 37 years from 1865 to 1902, its machinery and upper parts of its hull were removed with the intention of turning it into a barge, but it was later abandoned. The Mount Hope ferried people between Providence, Newport, and Block Island. Other ships in the shoal are more recent, including a barge that is also the most visible wreck in the shoal.

While the shoal was shallow enough to be difficult for many ships to travel through, its place in the busy harbor made it an easy place to dump unwanted ships. The shoal was also home to ship maintenance facilities, including the area's main ship repair facility, the Providence Dry Dock and Marine Railway Co., making it easy to recover anything of value before they were discarded. Robinson cites the combination of these conveniences as the primary reason the shoal accumulated so many ships. When the company closed in the early 20th century, the ships were left behind, floating near the coast of Bold Point. The poor quality of the water, increasingly polluted since the middle of the 19th century, and the related lack of marine life, may be responsible for the good condition of the wrecks years later.

According to Robinson via The Providence Journal, the graveyard contains six classes of ships: 2 sidewheeler cruise ships, 17 scow barges, 4 sailing ships, 3 harbor steamers, 2 steam/diesel boats, and 1 schooner barge.

Robinson describes the graveyard as not junk but "an archaeological site of some significance ... the last gasp of the merchant sailing fleet and the use of the bay as a playground for Rhode Islanders." He and marine archaeologist Susan Langley have made a case for preserving the area for its historical and cultural significance.

== Cleanup ==
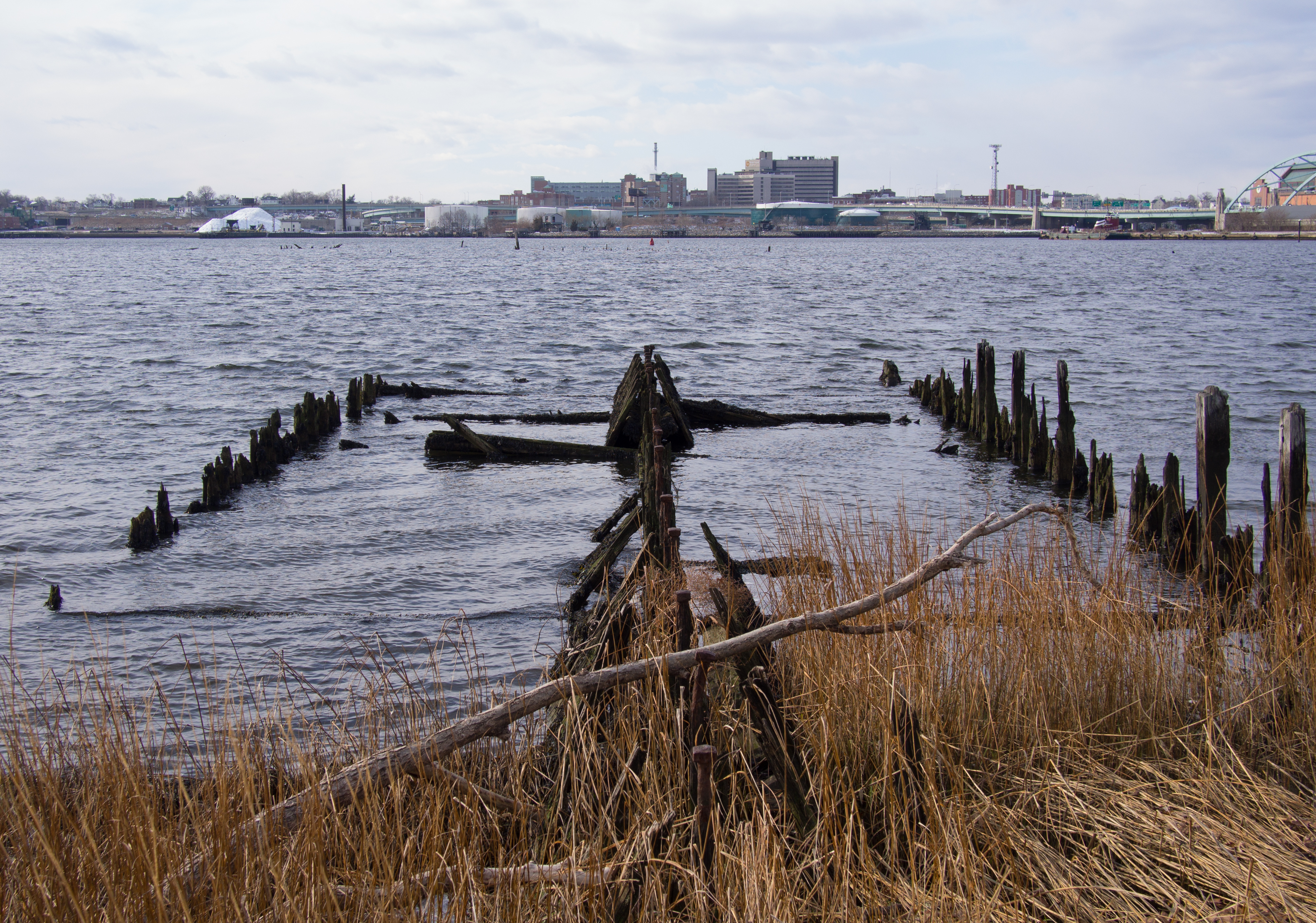
Green Jacket Shoal in 2017, viewed from Bold Point Park in East Providence

Clean Bays, a non-profit organization based in Middletown, Rhode Island, developed a technique for clearing underwater debris. It is based on the Aqualogger, a ship designed by Maine-based company Deadhead Lumber to recover valuable underwater timber. Clean Bays modified the design by equipping it with an underwater chainsaw which can drop down to cut pieces of wood from larger structures. By chopping up debris into smaller parts, it can be easier to bring them to shore, but importantly, it also does not dig up potentially harmful sediments like using more forceful pulling or dragging methods could. The technique was piloted near Bold Point Park in summer 2014, with a grant from the Schmidt Family Foundation's 11th Hour Racing project.

In 2015, Clean Bays removed two old barges from the shoal, and in 2014 and 2015, it received state and federal funding, through the National Oceanic and Atmospheric Administration, to pursue a year-long project to clean up not just Green Jacket Shoal but 350 acres of the Providence River and Seekonk River. For the larger project, the organization modified its own ships to function like the Aqualogger, rather than make arrangements to use it again. Some of the debris with historic value is planned to be left submerged.

According to U.S. Senator Sheldon Whitehouse, who supported the project, "This is kind of an effort at reclaiming the Seekonk River and the northern tip of the Bay from long-gone industrial uses and making them appropriate for the kind of residential and recreational uses that could be a real gift to the cities if it were made a more appealing amenity."
