= Bold Point =

Area of East Providence, Rhode Island

Coordinates: 41.815°N 71.391°W

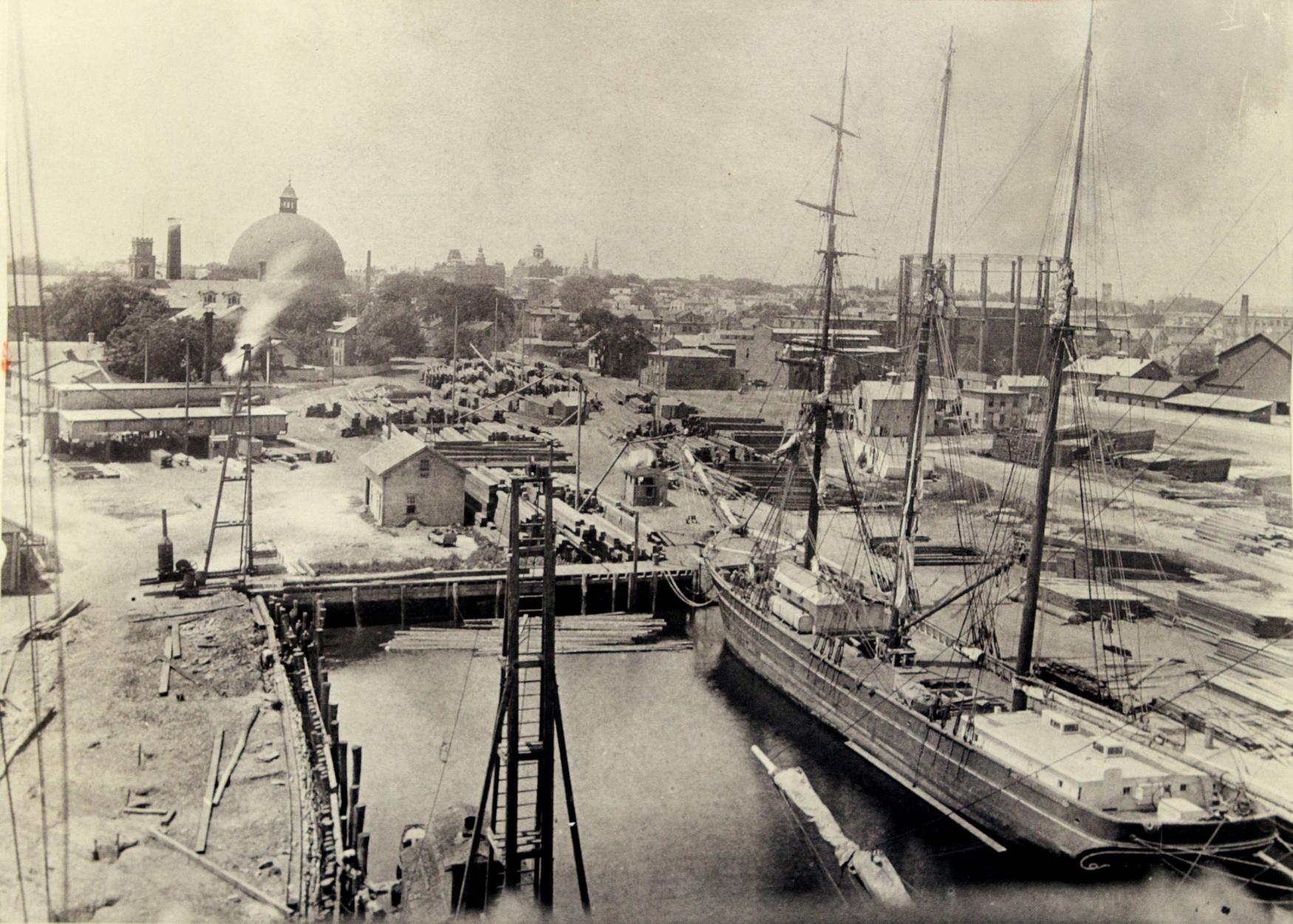
Providence Dry Dock and Marine Company at Bold Point circa 1910

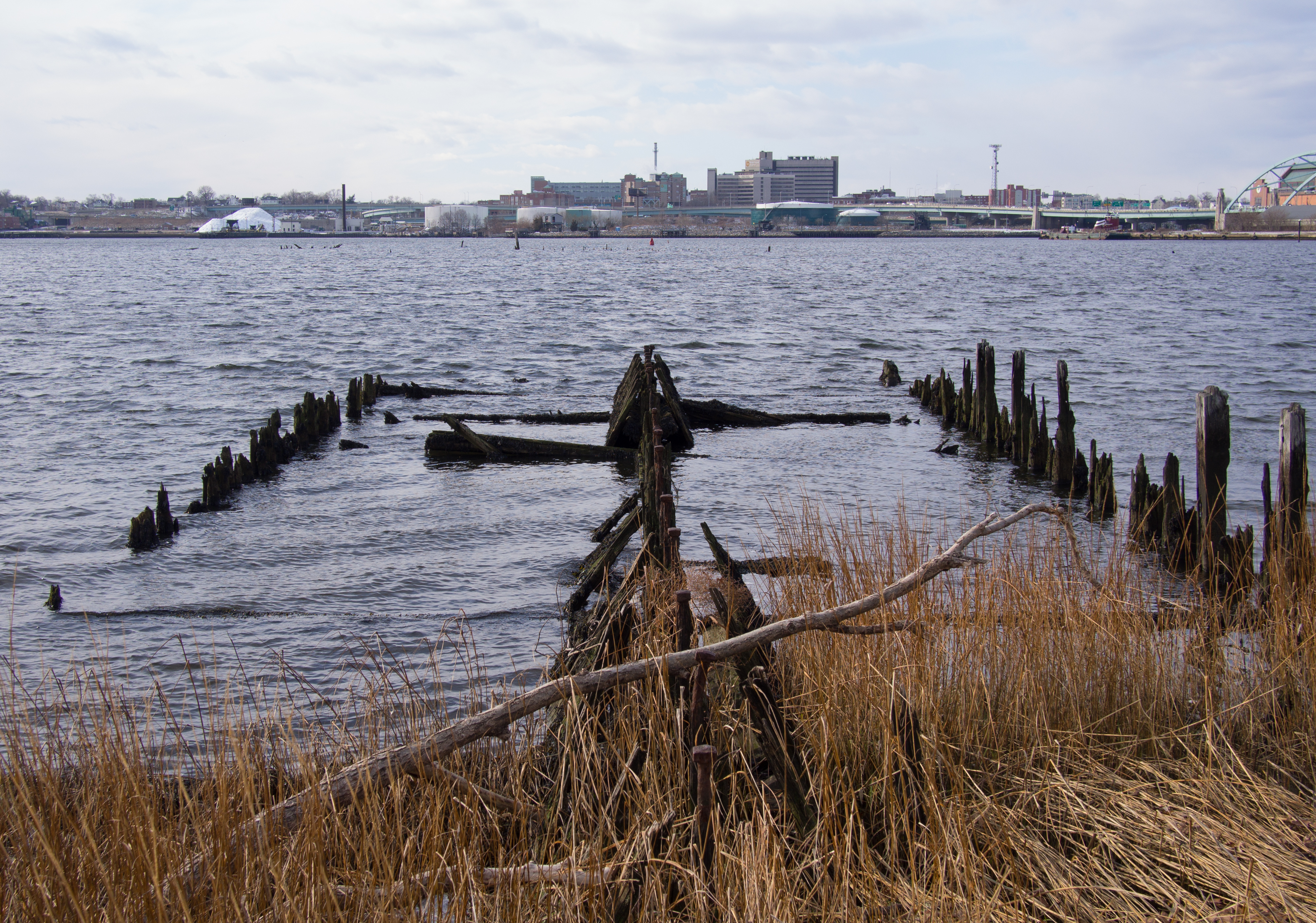
Debris in Green Jacket Shoal, on the coast of Bold Point Park in 2017

Bold Point is an area of East Providence, Rhode Island protruding into the Providence River. It was home to Providence Dry Dock and Marine Railway Co. around the turn of the 20th century, and today is home to Bold Point Park.

== History ==
Bold Point is located in the Watchemoket area of East Providence. The Wampanoags used the shallow water by Bold Point as a ford across the Seekonk River.

India Point, on the other side of the river, was Providence's first port, which remained active from 1680 until the Great Depression in the early 20th century. Its success was in part due to the large trading businesses of John Brown and his partner, John Francis, who set up in Providence in 1787. Brown built the first Washington Bridge between India Point and Watchemoket in 1793, while the latter was still part of Rehoboth, Massachusetts.

Bold Point was home to maritime businesses including Providence Dry Dock and Marine Railway Co., which operated two patent slips and the first floating dry dock in Narragansett Bay. According to The Providence Journal, from 1884 to 1919, it functioned as "the main ship repair facility in Providence." The 33-acre (13 ha) body of water between Bold Point and India Point, Green Jacket Shoal, is now Rhode Island's largest ship graveyard, largely due to the businesses on Bold Point.

== Bold Point Park ==
Bold Point is now a public park, Bold Point Park, owned by the City of East Providence. It is home to a boat launch and fishing area. In 2017, the City leased the area to Live Nation and RI Waterfront Events to hold concerts there, starting in summer 2017. It is the state's largest outdoor concert venue, with the capacity for about 4,000 attendees.
