= India Point Park =

Park in Providence, Rhode Island

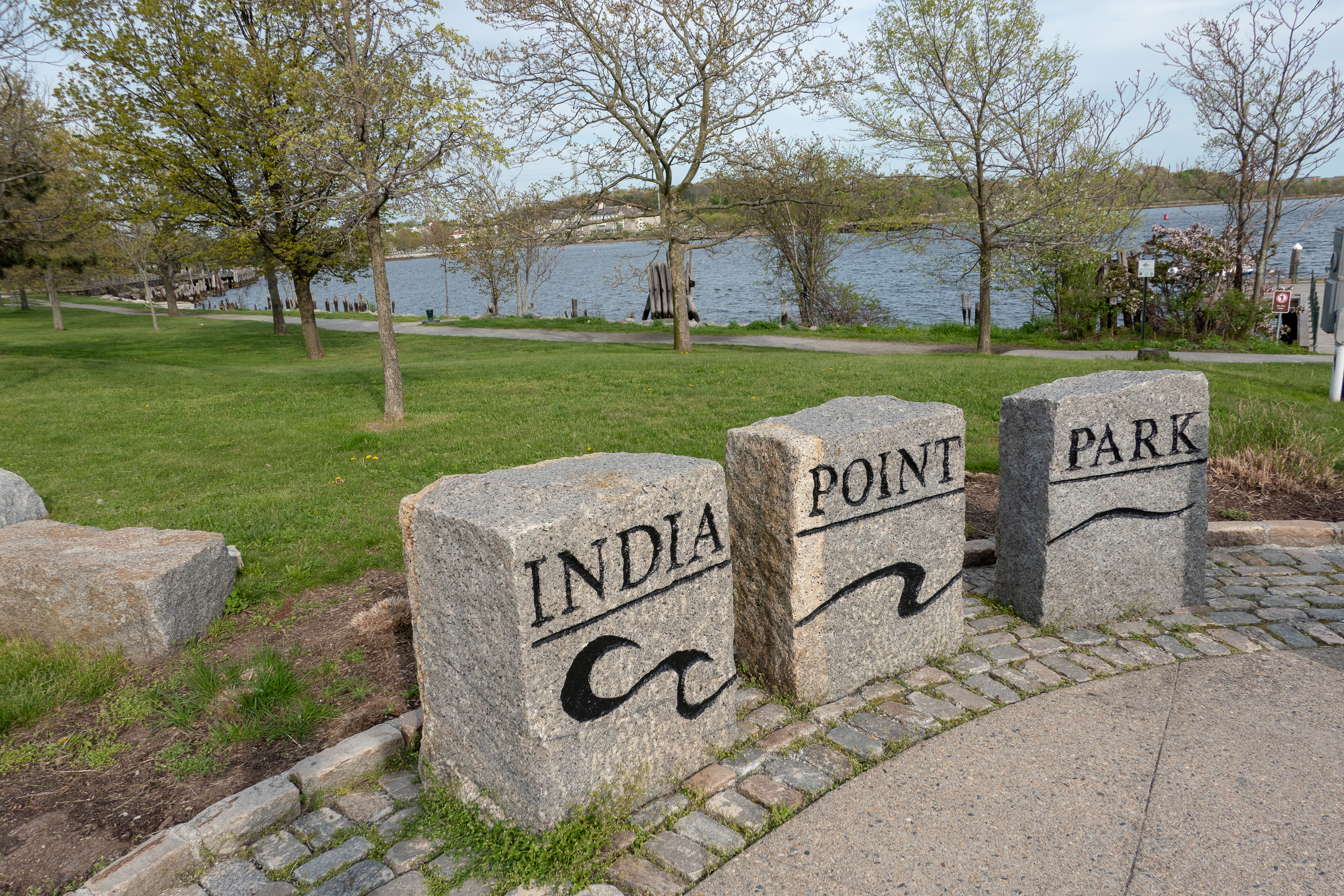
- Interactive map of India Point Park
- Location: Fox Point, Providence, Rhode Island
- Coordinates: 41.8176003°N 71.3925556°W
- Area: 18 acres (73,000 m^{2})
- Created: 1974
- Visitors: 75,000

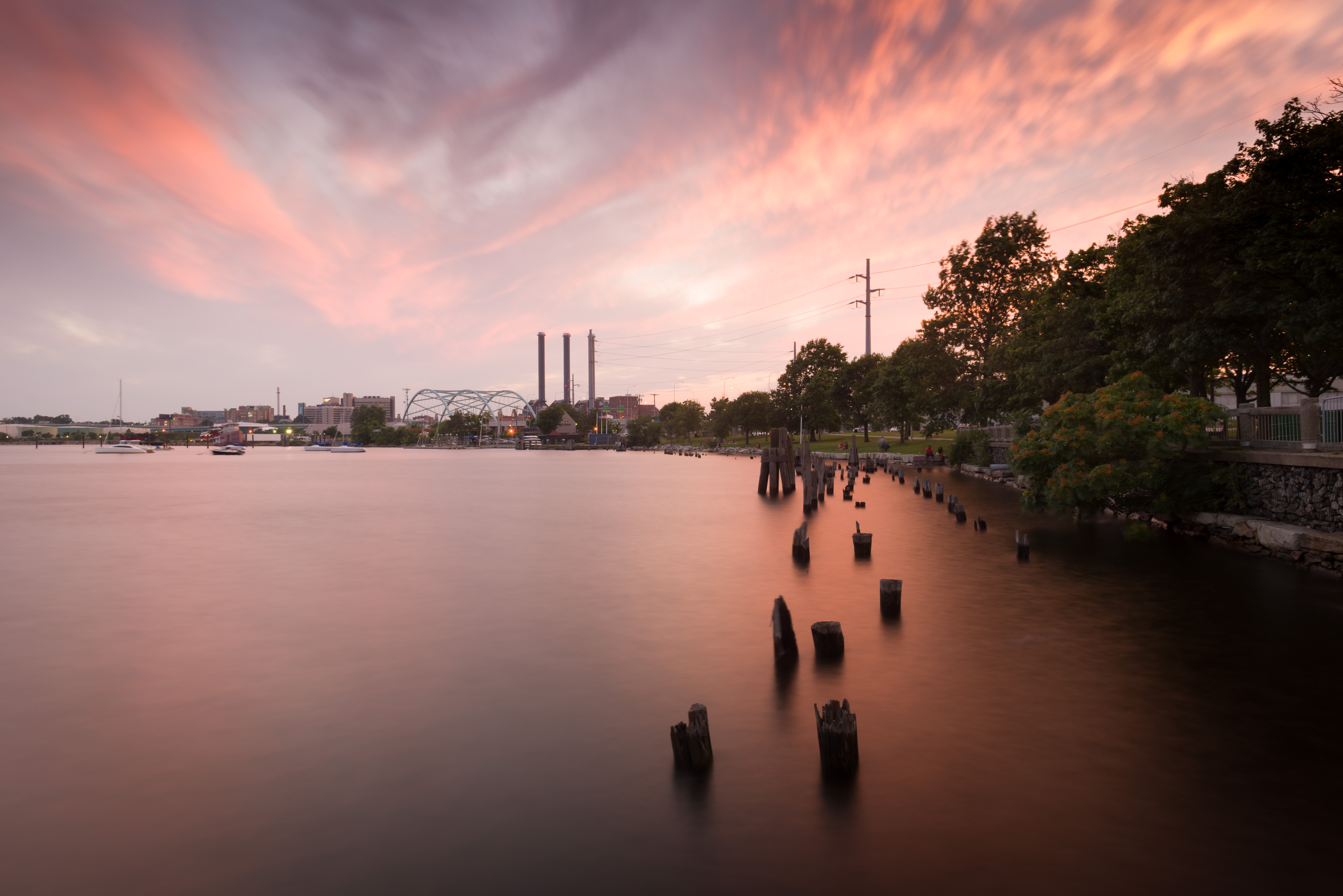
Sunset

India Point Park is a park in the Fox Point neighborhood of Providence, Rhode Island at the confluence of the Seekonk River and Providence River. The park takes its name from the maritime activity connecting Providence with the East and West Indies. The East Bay Bike Path begins at the eastern end of the park, and crosses over the Washington Bridge before heading to Watchemoket Square in East Providence and continuing on to the Bristol waterfront north of the Mount Hope Bridge. The park is also a part of the Washington–Rochambeau Revolutionary Route.

== History ==
India Point was Providence's first port. It was established in 1680 and flourished as a center of maritime trade for 250 years. John Brown established his tea and spice trade with the East Indies here, which is what gives the park its name. In August 1790, Brown took George Washington for a carriage ride to India Point. India Point Park remained an important trade center until the Great Depression.

=== Transportation center ===
During the early 1800s, Fox Point became a major transportation center for the city, serving as many as seven steamship lines. In 1835, the Boston and Providence Railroad opened on India Street at Ives Street.

==== Cargo shipping ====
During the 19th century, Providence was growing some of the largest manufacturing plants in the country, including Brown & Sharpe, Nicholson File, and Gorham Silverware. Many of these companies shipped their goods through the wharves at India Point. Providence shipped out cotton and woolen goods, hardware, machinery, steam engines, and other goods to the world. In return, the ships brought raw materials including cotton, wool, leather, iron, hides, and other products. By the late 1800s the ships were bringing coal to Providence. In 1878 coal imports peaked at nearly one million tons of coal, which were stored in storage yards and wharves along the harbor. Many of these wharf pilings were still visible a century later.

==== Passenger lines ====
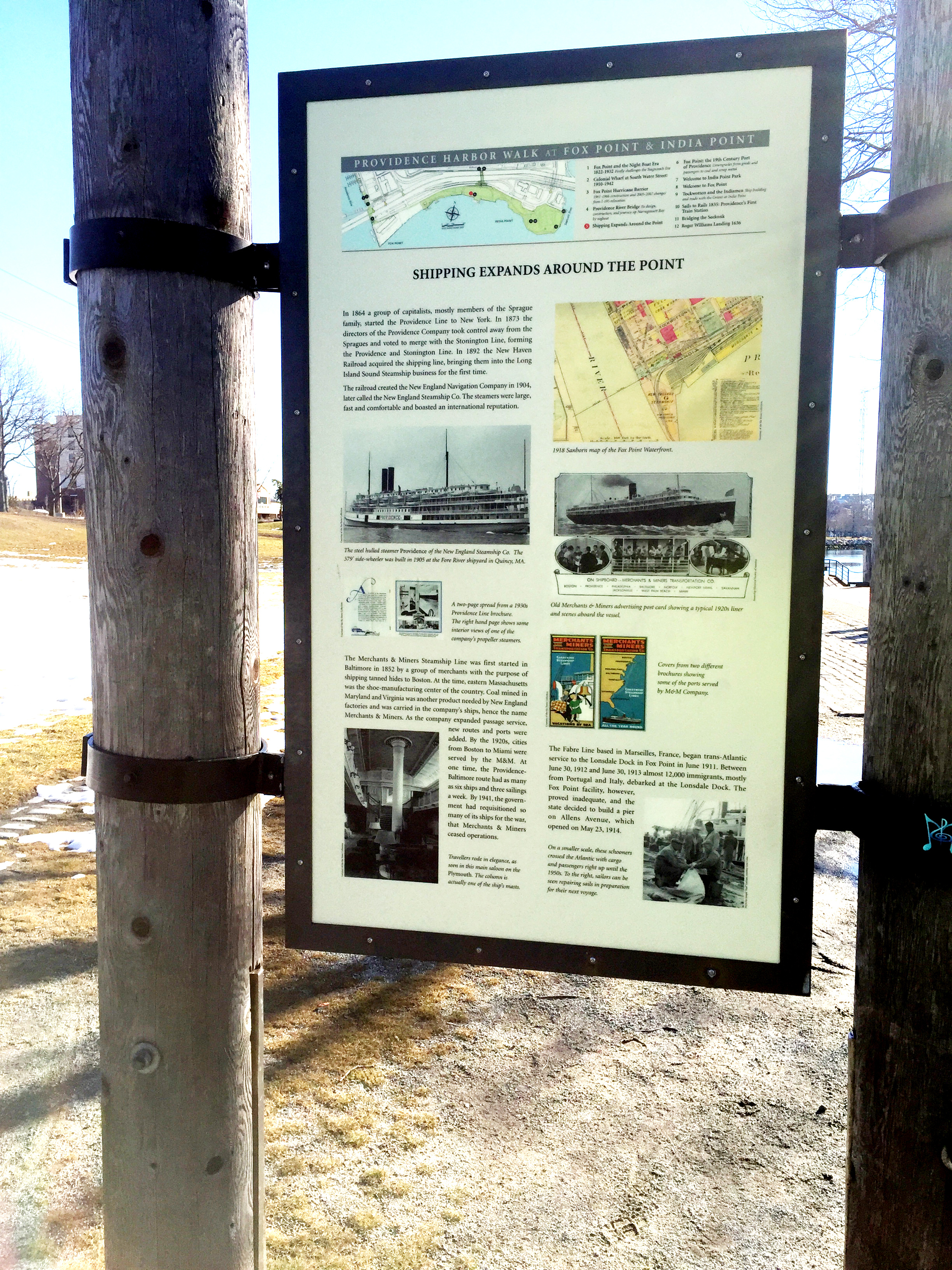
A sign in India Point Park tells the story of the steamships

On August 22, 1821, the steamboat Robert Fulton became the first steamboat to travel direct from New York to Providence. In addition to cargo, Fox Point was host to several passenger steamship lines, including the Providence and Stonington Line, the Long Island Sound Steamship line, the New England Steamship Company, the Merchants & Miners Steamship Line, and others. These large, fast, and comfortable ships brought passengers from ports such as Philadelphia, Boston, Baltimore, and Miami. In the 1920s, Merchants & Miners had six ships and three sailings per week from Baltimore to Providence. Service continued until 1941, when steamships were requisitioned for the war effort.

In June 1911, the French Fabre Line began trans-Atlantic service to Providence. Between June 30, 1912, and June 30, 1913, Fabre brought almost 12,000 mostly Italian and Portuguese immigrants to the Lonsdale Dock. The route was so popular that Fabre built an additional pier on Allens Avenue in 1914.

=== Decline of shipping ===
By the 1940s, after being battered by the 1938 New England hurricane, and with many steamships having been requisitioned for the war effort, commerce largely ceased. The Port of Providence was moved to Allens Avenue, which had deeper waters. As diesel fuel replaced coal, the coal yards of India Point were turned into scrap yards.

In the 1960s, the construction of Interstate 195 cut India Point off from the rest of the neighborhood. Architectural historian William McKenzie Woodward believed the effect was poorly mitigated by the pedestrian walkway.

=== Beautification and park ===
In the 1960s and 1970s, Providence underwent a concerted beautification effort, including, finally, the transformation of India Point into a public park dedicated in 1974.

The original pedestrian bridge over I-195 was demolished in 2005 for an expanded linear park bridge which opened a few years later, providing greater access for the greater Fox Point neighborhood. Foot traffic has also benefitted from the George Redman Linear Park, which was completed in September 2015.

The long period of neglect is still reflected in the condition of the Green Jacket Shoal, the section of the Providence River between Fox Point and Riverside, which has accumulated a century's worth of debris. Remnants of destroyed docks, pilings, a dry dock, shipwrecks, abandoned ships, and other structures stick out of the water in many places around the shoal, owing to many years of natural disasters and economic hardship. As the character of the area moved away from its industrial past, and with increased public recreational use of the water via India Point Park and Bold Point, the detritus has come to be a noted source of urban blight and a safety concern for anyone using the water. A cleanup effort began in 2015 with federal, state, and non-governmental funding.

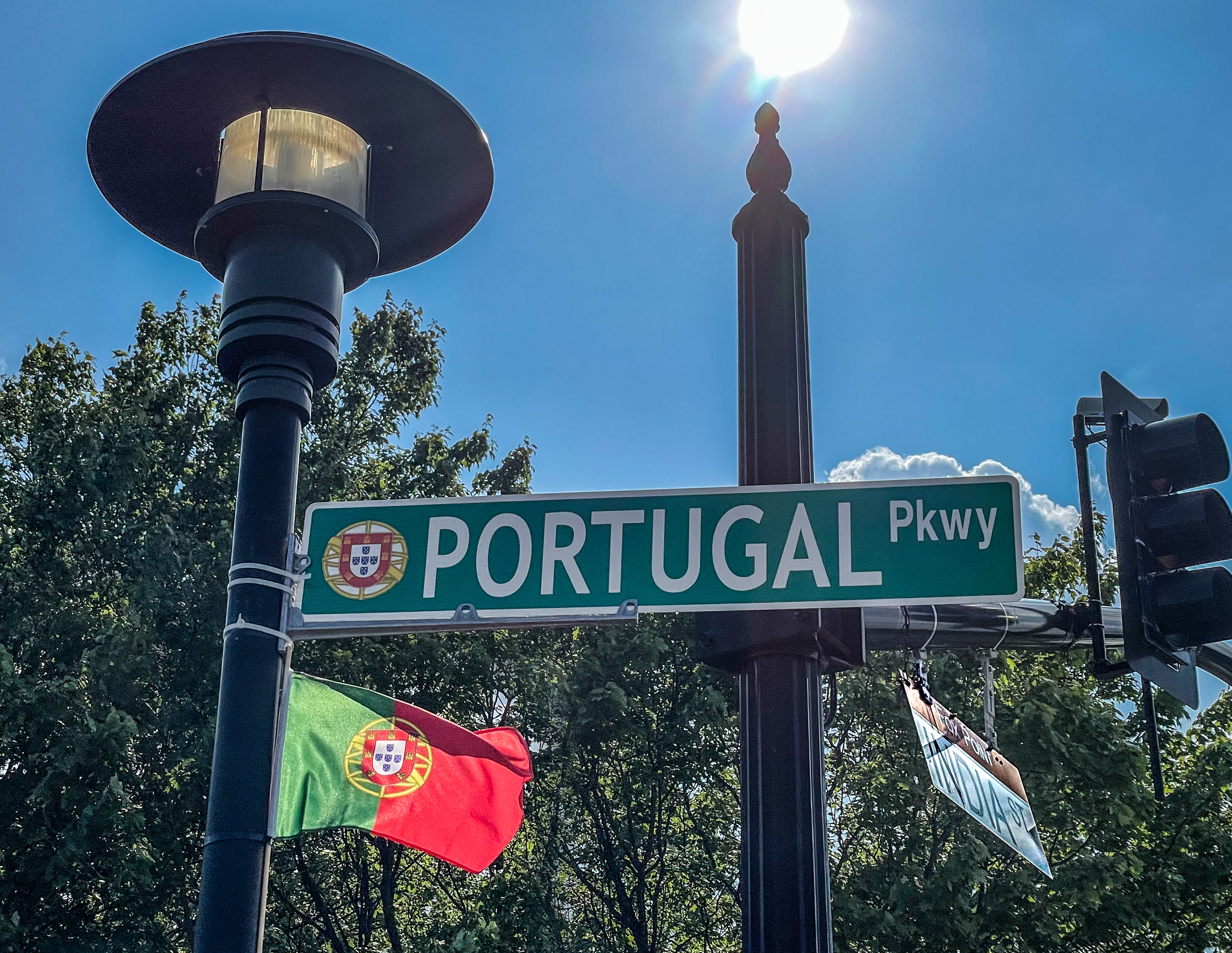
"Portugal Parkway" sign

India Street, which runs along India Point Park, was renamed "Portugal Parkway" in 2023 to commemorate the neighborhood's history as an immigration hub for Portuguese immigrants from 1865 through the 1930s. Providence City Councilor John Gonçalves introduced the necessary city resolution at the request and urging of Orlando Mateus, former president of the "R.I. [Rhode Island] Day of Portugal"; the master of ceremonies for the event was State Senator and Senate Minority Leader Jessica de la Cruz, and Senator Jack Reed and Representative Seth Magaziner also attended and participated.

== Events ==
Events at India Point Park

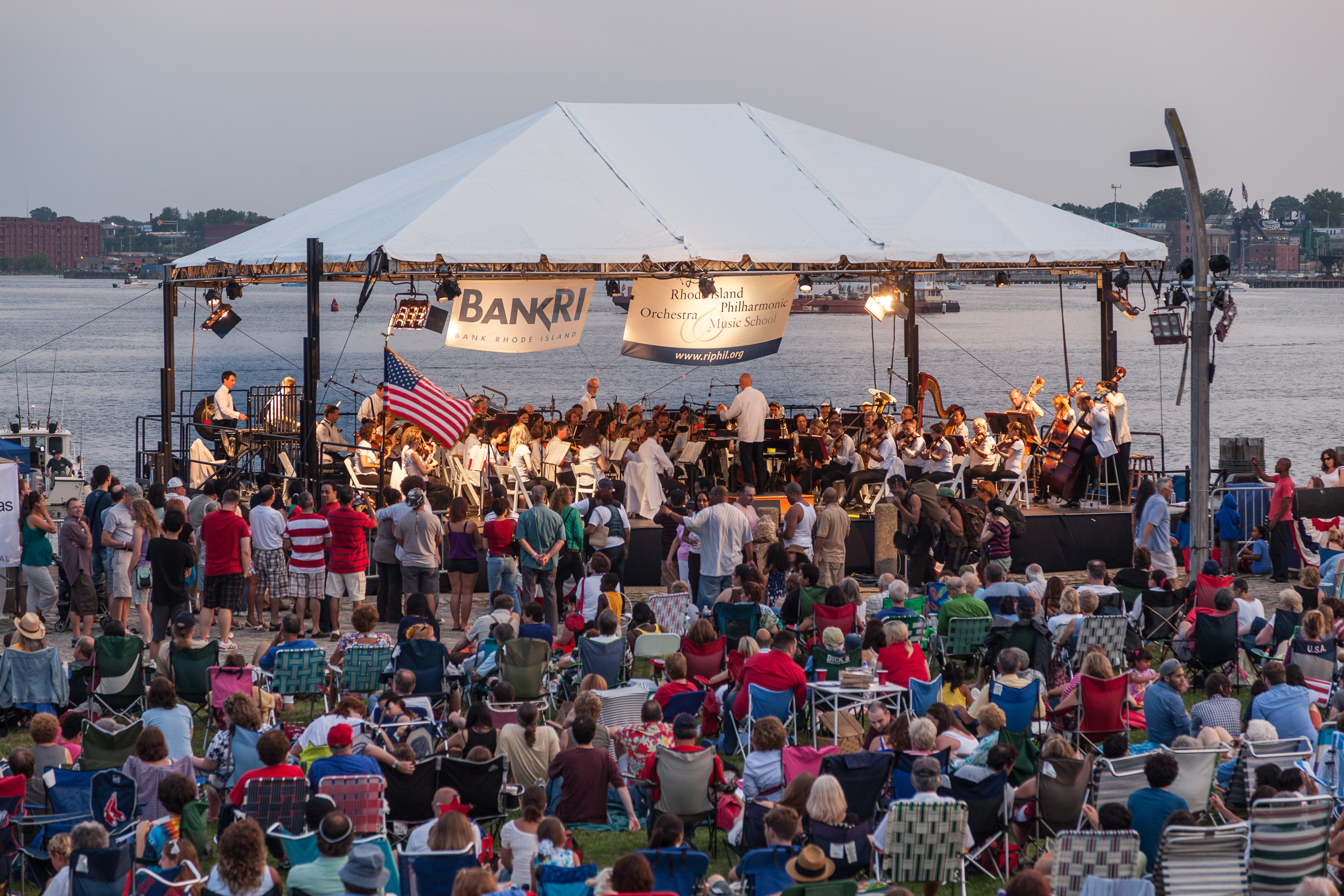
July 4 concert, 2012

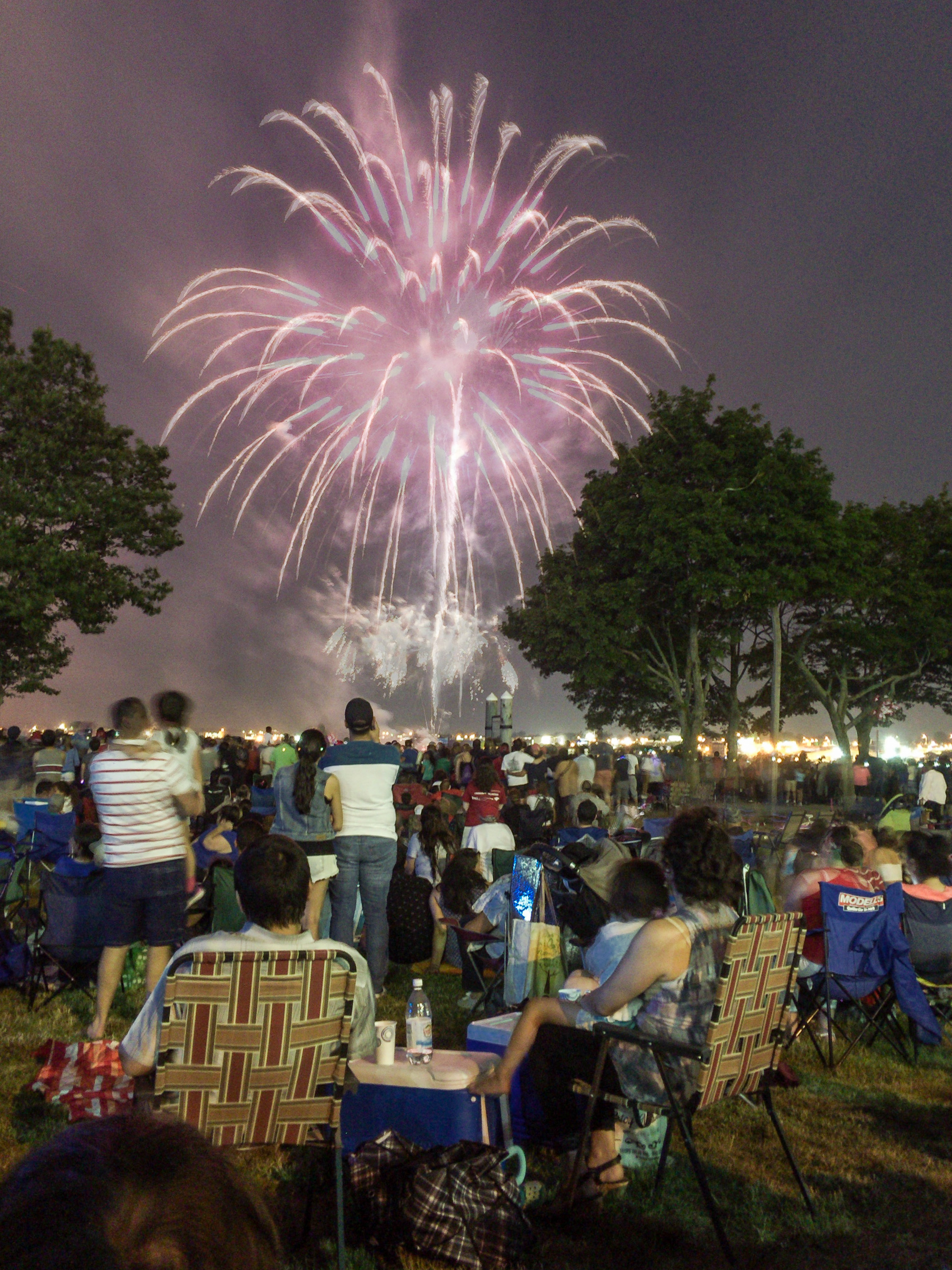
July 4 fireworks, 2016

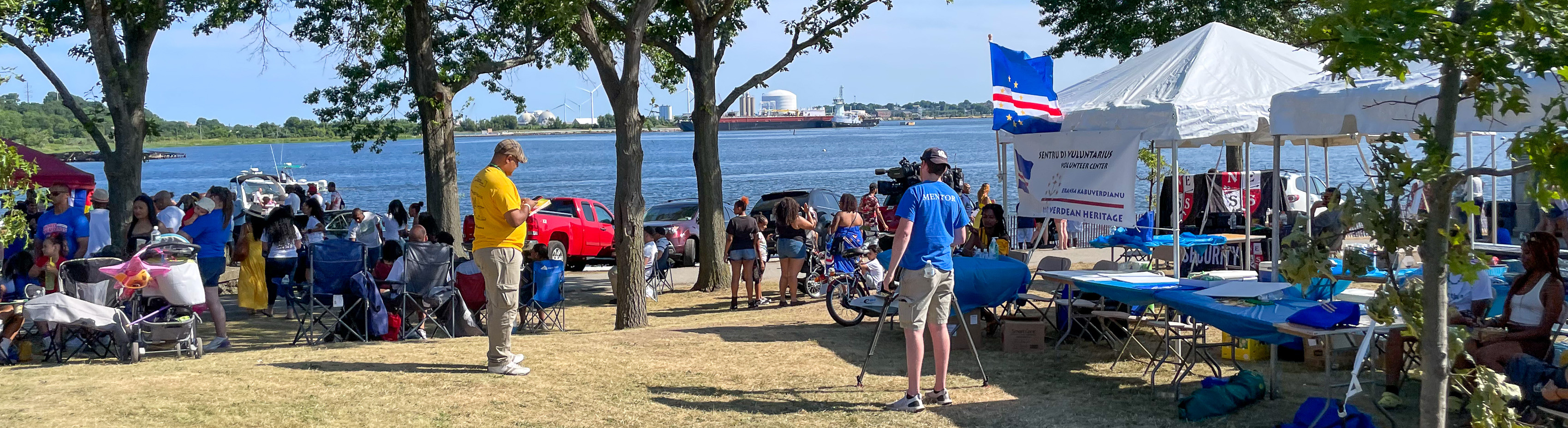
Cape Verdean Independence Day Festival, 2022

India Point Park is the setting for many events, including an annual Fourth of July concert and fireworks display, Cape Verdean Independence Day Festival (July, said to be the oldest in the nation), the Rhode Island Seafood Festival in September, movie nights, poetry readings, and various others.

== Panorama ==
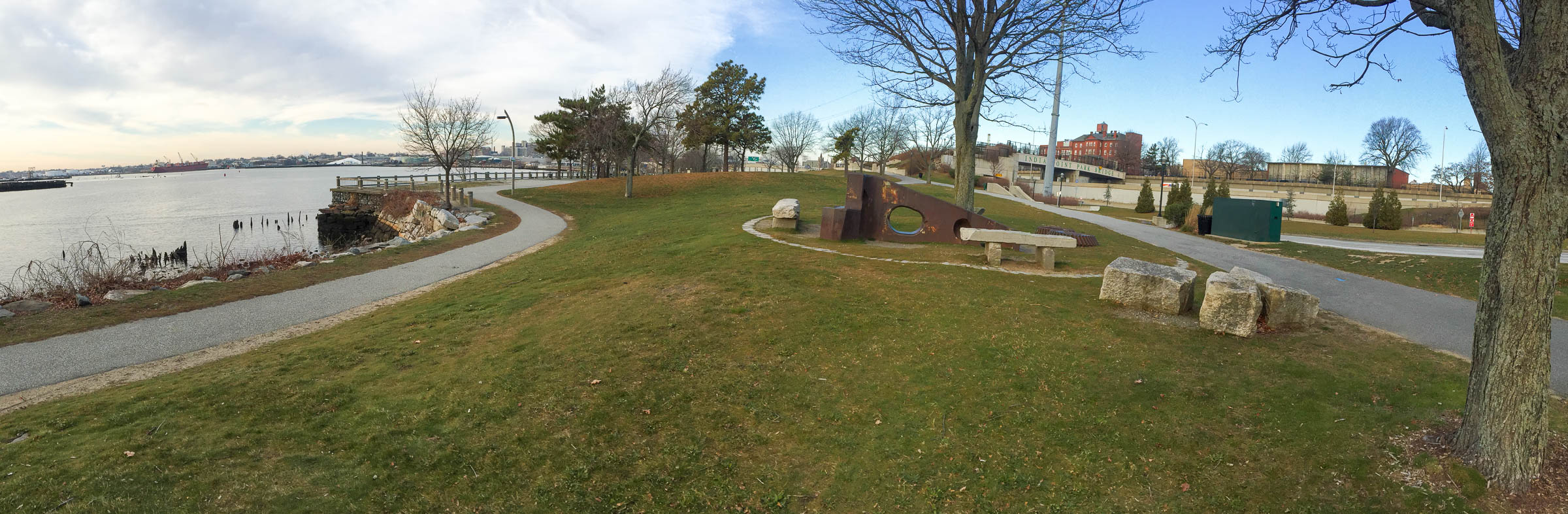
Panorama of India Point Park showing recreational paths and a railway stop repurposed as industrial art. Pedestrian bridge across I-195 visible in background.

== Linear Park Bridge and Performing Arts Amphitheater ==
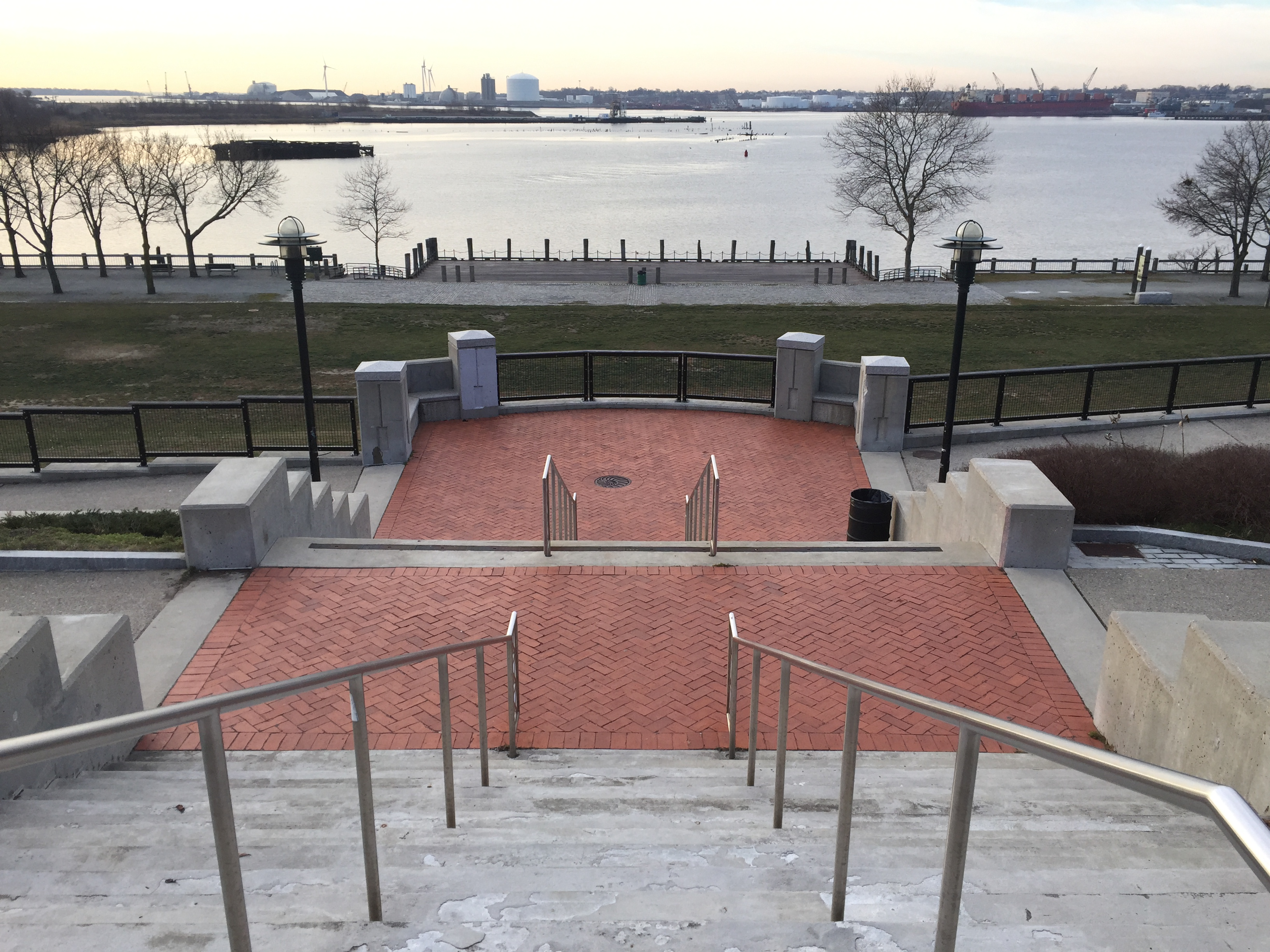
View of the park and bay from the steps coming from the I-195 pedestrian bridge.

The new linear park pedestrian bridge over Interstate 195 is six times wider than the one it replaced, and connects to East Street. It features benches, decorative lighting and landscaping of flowers, shrubs and small trees on the bridge itself, and a stair/ramp system on the park side. The watering system was installed in the fall of 2009. The ramp leading to the linear park bridge also serves as 'on the green' seating for the amphitheater formed at the base/shoreline of the park. Such events as July 4 performances of the Rhode Island Philharmonic Symphony Orchestra have taken place in this performing arts space.

Other amenities include the Hilton Garden Inn Hotel, the Marston Boathouse, and a sports field on the east end of the park.

== See also ==
- Fox Point, Providence, Rhode Island
