= Bucklin Brook =

Stream in Rhode Island, United States

Coordinates: 41.889506°N 71.367192°W

Bucklin Brook is a brook in Pawtucket, Rhode Island. It is 3 miles long and was at one time the source of drinking water for the city from a reservoir that was located at present day McCoy Stadium. The upper portion of the stream up to the stadium was buried in the 1930s to make room for development. The lower portion from the stadium to its mouth was buried in the 1960s because of an outbreak of polio. The brook still flows under the city.

== Course ==
The brook begins behind the Stop & Shop on Cottage Street from a small wetland that is still above ground. From there it flows south through culverts through Oak Grove and Walnut Hill Cemeteries. It continues past the stadium and Dunnell Park near Prospect Heights, where the remains of an old bridge crossing are still visible. The stream comes out of the culvert and flows above ground for a short distance behind an industrial area on Beverage Hill Ave, before entering the Seekonk River near Bishop's Bend. Unfortunately, the brook is in an abused area when it is above ground, with very poor access.

== Revitalization ==
In September 2020, Friends of the Ten Mile River Watershed made a video, Where is Bucklin Brook as a way to bring attention to the brook.
