= Seekonk River =

River in Rhode Island, United States

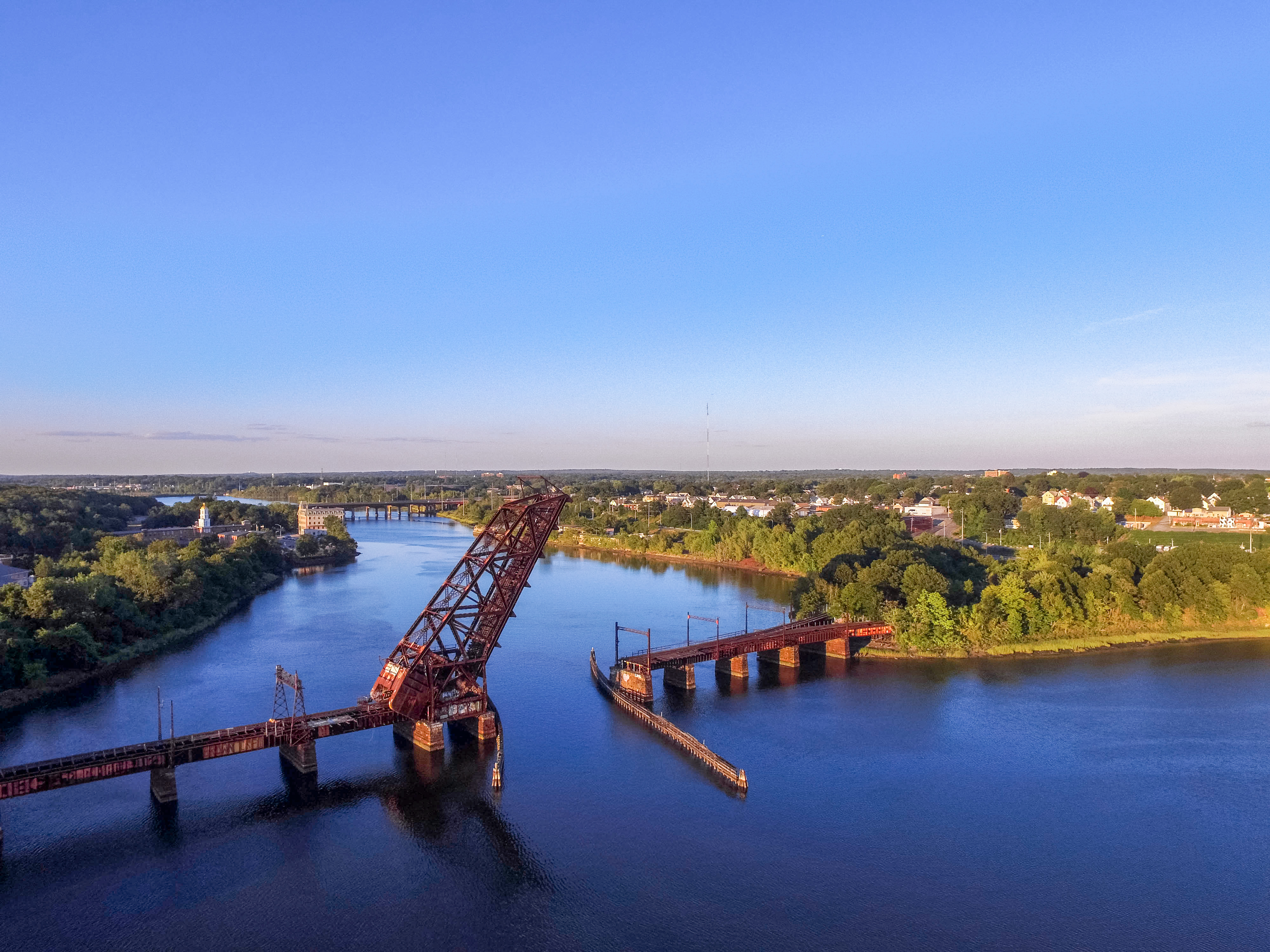
- Seekonk River at Providence, Rhode Island, with a view of the Crook Point Bascule Bridge

Location
- Country: United States
- State: Rhode Island
- County: Providence

Physical characteristics
- Source
  - location: Blackstone River, at Pawtucket Falls in Pawtucket, Rhode Island
  - coordinates: 41.8771°N 71.3822°W
- Mouth
  - location: Providence River in Providence, Rhode Island
  - coordinates: 41.8163°N 71.3910°W
- Length: 8 km (5.0 mi)

The Seekonk River is a tidal extension of the Providence River in the U.S. state of Rhode Island. It flows approximately 5 km (3 mi). The name may be derived from an Algonquian word for skunk or for black goose. The river is home to the Brown University men's rowing team, India Point Park, Blackstone Park Conservation District, Crook Point Bascule Bridge, Narragansett Boat Club (the oldest rowing club in the country), Swan Point Cemetery, and the Bucklin Point waste-water treatment facility. The River is listed by the Rhode Island Department of Environmental Management as an impaired waterway.

== Course ==
The Seekonk River begins after the Pawtucket River, which flows for approximately 1.5 miles from where the Blackstone River reaches sea level below Pawtucket Falls to the border of Providence and East Providence. From there the Seekonk River flows for approximately 3 miles due south between Providence and East Providence, picks up flow from the Ten Mile River, and eventually flows into the Providence River between Bold Point and India Point.

== Slate Rock ==
Slate Rock

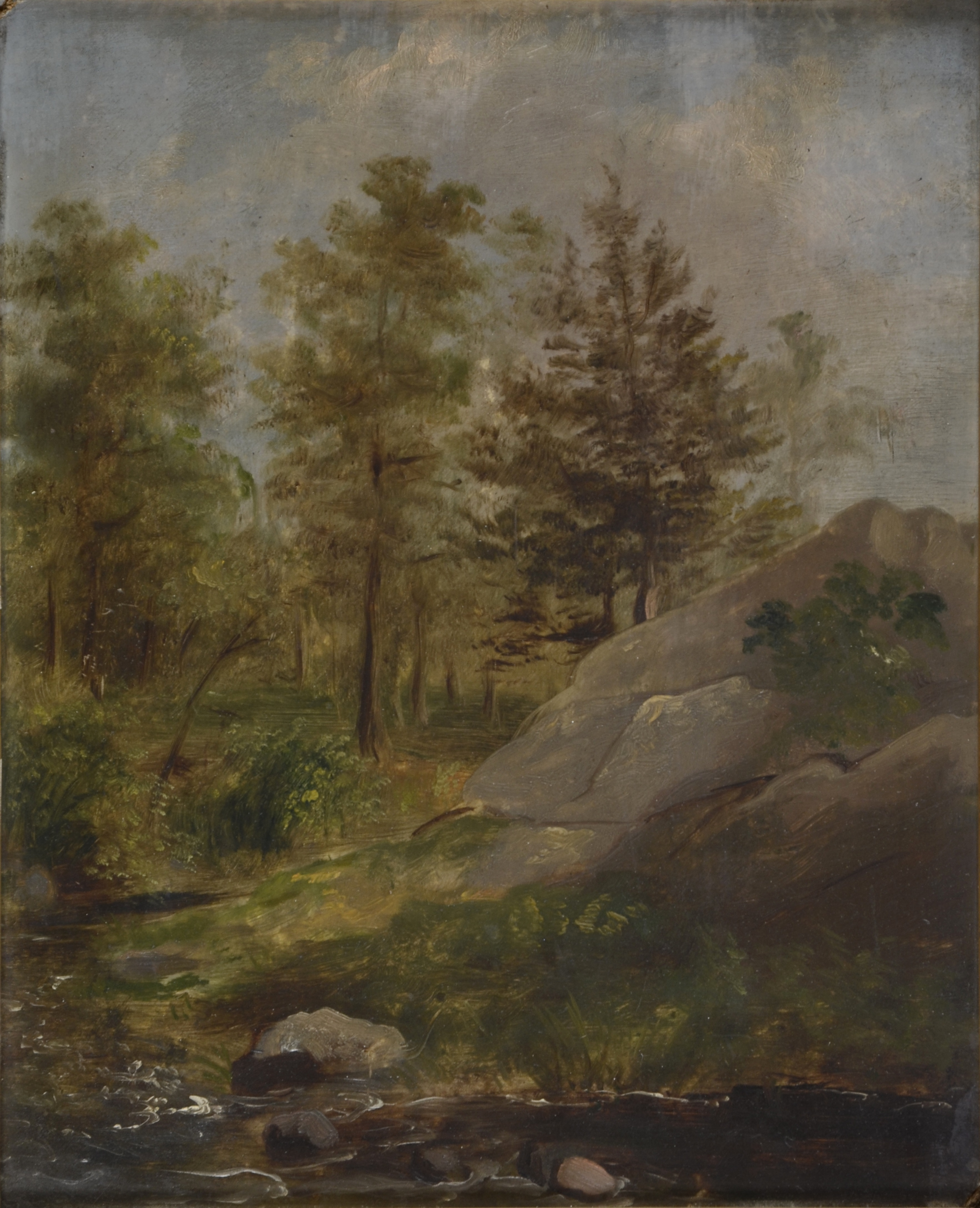
1847 painting by James Sullivan Lincoln

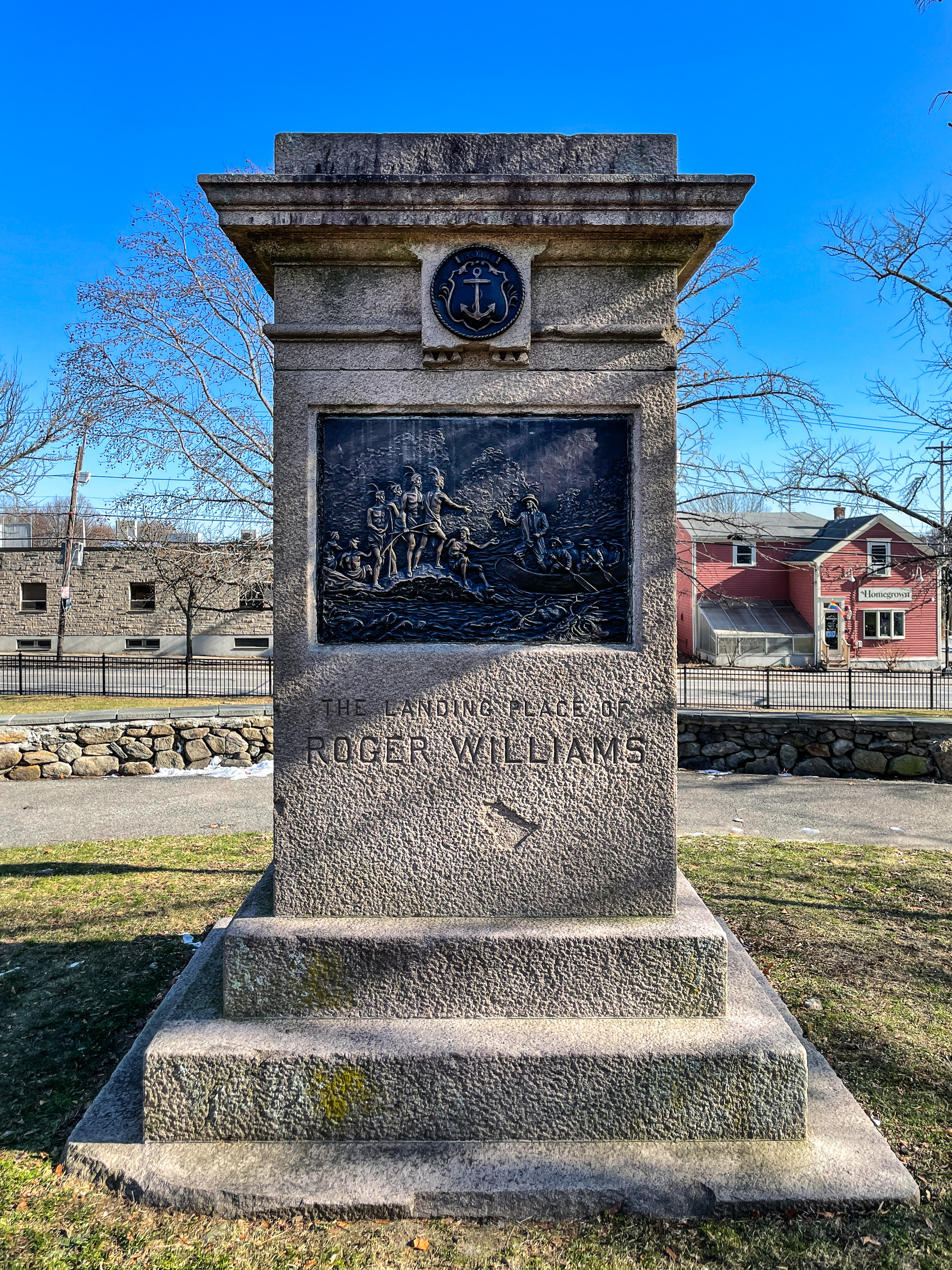
Slate Rock memorial

A prominent boulder on the west shore of the Seekonk River (near the current Gano Park) was once one of Providence's most important historic landmarks. Slate Rock was said to be the spot where a group of Narragansett people first welcomed the exiled Roger Williams in 1636 with the famous phrase "What cheer, netop?", and directed him to his eventual settlement location at the fork of the Woonasquatucket and Moshassuck Rivers.

In 1860, two ashlars cut from Slate Rock, each roughly one foot thick, one foot face, and four feet high, were placed in What Cheer Lodge, a Masonic lodge in Providence. The finely polished perfect ashlar, erected beside the chair of the Senior Warden, bears the following inscription:

This ashlar was taken from the rock on which Roger Williams, the founder of Providence, first landed, A. D. 1636, When he was greeted with the Indian salutation, "What cheer?"—What Cheer Lodge, No. 21, Chartered November 30, A. L. 5857

The rough stone, set up next to the Junior Warden's chair, is engraved with the words "What Cheer Rock, Quarried May 2d [sic], A. L, 5860" in gilded letters.

The historic rock was accidentally blown up by city workers in 1877. They were attempting to expose a buried portion of the stone, but used too much dynamite and the stone was "blasted to pieces." Pieces of the stone were later sold for souvenirs. A monument in nearby Slate Rock Park commemorates the location.

== Flora and fauna ==
The Seekonk River is home to numerous fauna that either migrate to the bay at some point during the year or live there year-round. Several species of fish, shellfish and crab have been documented. Birds include loon, cormorants, herons, gulls, terns, swans and geese.

Spartina and Phragmites grasses are found in high marsh areas, while brown and green seaweeds are found in the intertidal zone. Riparian vegetation includes shrubs such as Rosa rugosa and trees like willow, oak and beech.

== Crossings ==
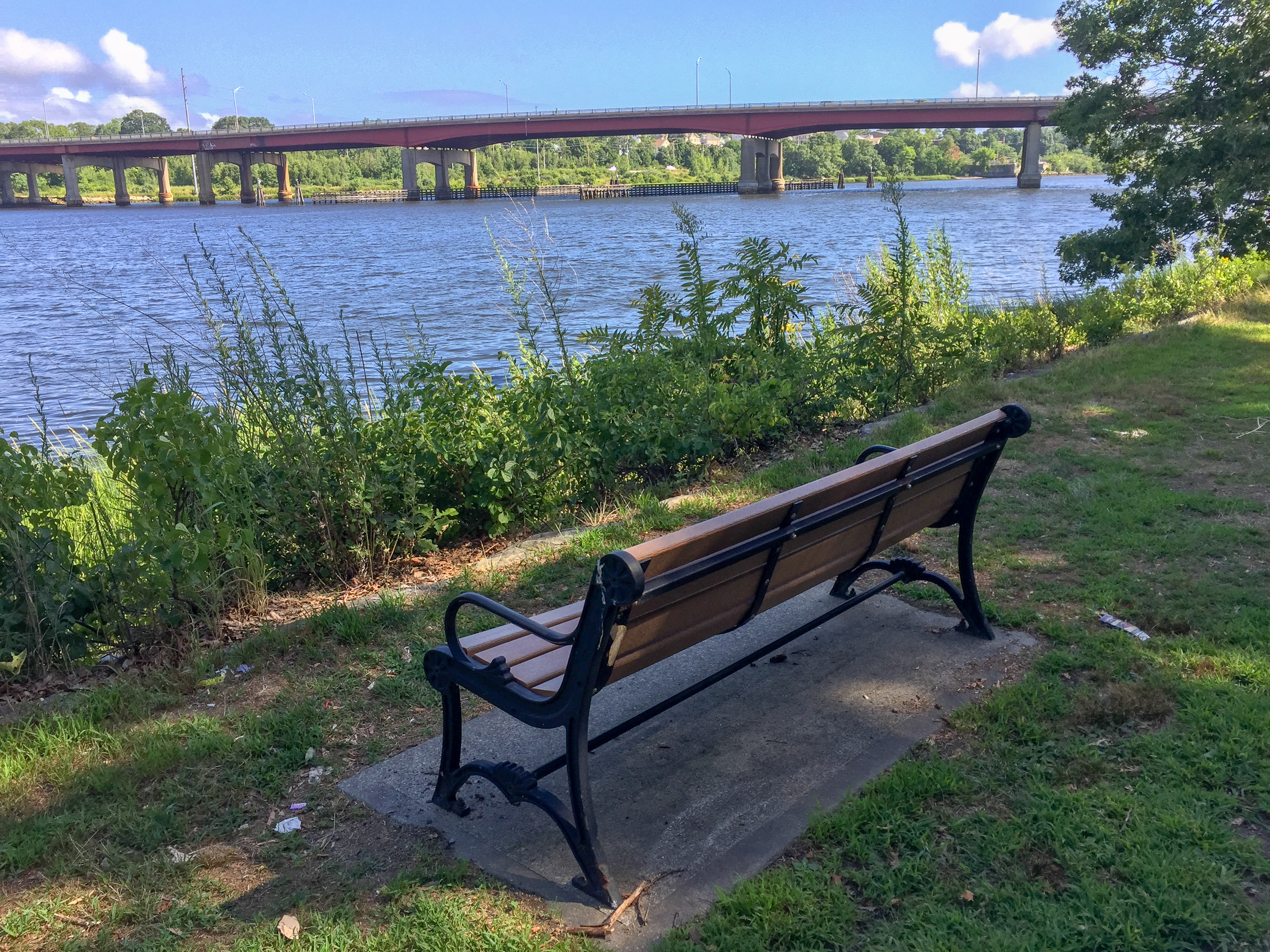
Looking out at the Henderson Bridge from Blackstone Park

Below is a list of all crossings over the Seekonk River. The list starts at the headwaters and goes downstream.

- Pawtucket
  - Main Street Bridge
  - Pawtucket River Bridge; Carries Interstate 95 and U.S. 1
  - Division Street Bridge
- Providence
  - Henderson Bridge
  - Crook Point Bascule Bridge
  - Washington Bridge; Carries Interstate 195, U.S. 6 and U.S. 44.

== Tributaries ==
- Blackstone River
- Ten Mile River
- Bucklin Brook

== See also ==
- List of rivers in Rhode Island
- Green Jacket Shoal, a ship graveyard at the mouth of the river
