= Brown University men's rowing =

- University: Brown University
- Head coach: Paul Cooke (24th season)
- Conference: Ivy League; 1 Division
- Location: Providence, Rhode Island, US
- Facility: Hunter S. Marston Boathouse
- Area of Practice: Seekonk River
- Nickname: Bruno or Brunonian
- Colors: Seal brown, cardinal red, and white

National championships
- 1979, 1983, 1986, 1993, 1994, 1995

Conference championships
- 1972, 1984, 1987, 1993, 1994, 2000, 2008, 2009, 2012, 2024

The Brown University men's rowing team represents Brown University in men's intercollegiate rowing and is the oldest organized intercollegiate sport at the university. Since its revival in 1949, the Brown University rowing program has become one of the most successful collegiate rowing programs in the world, winning men's and women's national titles, as well as championship titles at the world-famous Henley Royal Regatta in England. In addition, the program has produced 32 Olympic rowers.

Brown rowing is characterized by its home course, the Seekonk River, and its historic rivalry with Yale and Harvard. The Brown rowing blade is half white (on bottom) and half brown (on the top).

== History ==
=== Early years (1857–1886) ===
Brown rowing was founded June 4, 1857, with the establishment of the University Boat Club, and consisted of a single six-oar shell, the Atalanta. According to the Encyclopedia Brunoniana, on September 11, 1857, the Brown Paper wrote:

"She was there received by the club, borne to the water's edge and launched on the waves of Narragansett Bay with enthusiastic demonstrations from an assembled crowd." – The Brown Paper, September 11, 1857

Described as "a cumbersome lap-streak, weighing three or four hundred pounds," the shell only competed once, in a race on July 27, 1859, against Harvard and Yale at Lake Quinsigamond in Worcester, Massachusetts. Because the boat weighed almost 150 pounds (68 kg) more than the Harvard and Yale boats, Brown lost the race, finishing over five minutes behind the victorious Harvard crew.

It was not until eleven years later, on June 17, 1860, that Brown won against Harvard and Yale, claiming its first and only race between 1857 and 1950. According to Harold Amber's book, Ever True: The History of Brown Crew, Brown, in a spectacular series of events, recovered from a collision with an Amherst boat, executed a pristine turn, and overtook Yale and Harvard to win by six lengths.

However, after that 1860 race, little changed over the next 26 years, and Brown suffered defeat after defeat, mishap after mishap; on November 8, 1874, the college boathouse caught fire and burned down, the club was almost constantly in debt, and interest in the program fluctuated so much that often there were not enough oarsmen to fill a boat. By 1886, the university had given up crew in favor of directing athletic funds towards baseball.

=== Revival (1947–1949) ===
The topic of Brown crew was brought up off and on for many years, but there was concern that a revival of crew would draw too heavily from the pool of track athletes and might also create a heavy financial burden on the university.

In 1947, two former prep-school oarsmen, James Donaldson and Harlan Bartlett, began to rebuild the program. With ten other students who had previous experience in rowing, the twelve oarsmen bought an old eight-oared shell from St. Andrew's School in Delaware for $100. With their new boat, rented boat space at the Narragansett Boat Club, and volunteer coach, Robert O. Reed, the crew began practicing on the Seekonk River.

=== "The Cinderella Crew": Brown gains recognition ===
In 1951, 1952, and 1953, a handful of victories brought the team some attention, but it was not until Gordon "Whitey" Helander took the reins in 1959 that the program gained recognition. At the time Helander was a student at the Rhode Island School of Design. Under his coaching, Brown won the Dad Vail Regatta in 1959, 1960, and 1961, with an undefeated 1960 regular season.

In 1960, the undefeated team entered the IRA, finishing fourth and the Olympic trials. This Brown crew, previously dubbed "The Orphans of the Seekonk", was re-christened "The Cinderella Crew" and Brown announced it was recognizing crew that fall.

Following the 1961 season, in which the crew posted a 5–1 record, fifth at Eastern Sprints, and seventh in the IRA, rowing became an officially recognized and supported intercollegiate sport at Brown University. That August, Brown crew hired its first full-time coach, Victor H. Michalson, and in 1962 it became a regular member of the Eastern Association of Rowing Colleges.

=== Champions (1993–1995) ===
In 1993, the Brown crew team had a perfect season. The eight-man crew consisted of Igor Boraska, Paul DiGiacomo, David Filippone, Gus Koven, Jamie Koven, Xeno Muller, Tony Padula, Chris Sahs, and coxswain Brian Madden. The team went undefeated, won the Eastern Sprints, the IRA (Intercollegiate Rowing Association) Championships, and the National Collegiate Rowing Championships. To finish it off, they captured the Ladies' Plate at the Henley Royal Regatta on July 4. Five of the eight members of the team went on to represent their respective countries in the Olympics.

=== Cooke era (1996–present) ===
In 1996, Paul Cooke was named head coach of the freshman team, and in 2002 became the head coach of the varsity team. Under Cooke, the Bears have maintained their reputation as one of the most formidable rowing schools in the nation. The 2007–2008 team won an Ivy League championship title as well as a top-10 finish in the IRA Regatta. In 2008–2009, Brown documented a historic season, finishing second in the Champ 8 at the Head of the Charles, sweeping the heavyweight events at Eastern Sprints, placing third overall at Nationals, and capturing the Ladies' Plate Challenge Cup at the Henley Royal Regatta in England.

== Location and facilities ==
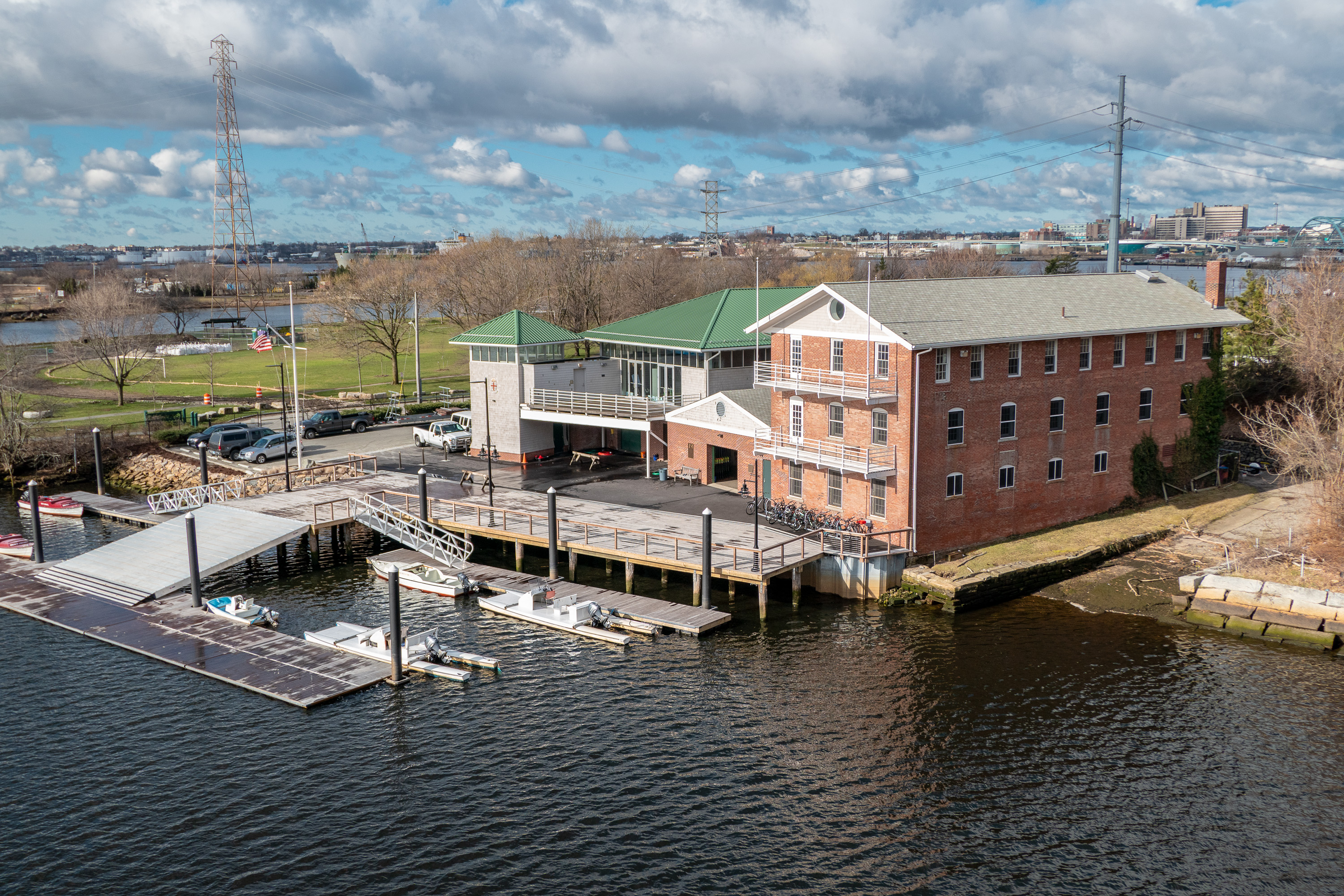
Hunter S. Marston Boathouse

=== Marston Boathouse ===
The home of the Brown University Rowing Team is the Hunter S. Marston Boathouse. The boathouse was purchased by Brown University in 1966 with funds donated by Hunter S. Marston, and dedicated October 7, 1967. Previously, the facility had been used as a fish processing plant by the Saltesea Packing Company.

The boathouse was modernized and renovated in 1994. The facility underwent a $1 million renovation by New England Construction in August 2008. In summer 2018, The dock was rebuilt, extending into the river further and with new sections for launches. A renovation of the interior of Marston Boathouse, with enhanced spaces for indoor rowing and weightlifting, as well as new locker rooms, was completed in April 2021.

=== Seekonk River ===
The boathouse is located on the Seekonk River. Considered to be one of the tougher courses in the Ivy League, the Seekonk is known for its difficult rowing conditions, particularly heavy wind and waves, as well as a strong current. Many have attributed Brown's rowing success in part to the harsh conditions in which the team often practices.

== Honors ==
=== Henley Royal Regatta ===
Year	Races won
1984	Ladies' Challenge Plate
1993	Ladies' Challenge Plate
1994	Thames Challenge Cup
2000	Ladies' Challenge Plate
2009	Ladies' Challenge Plate
