= Talbot Avenue station =

Train station in Dorchester, Boston, US

Talbot Avenue
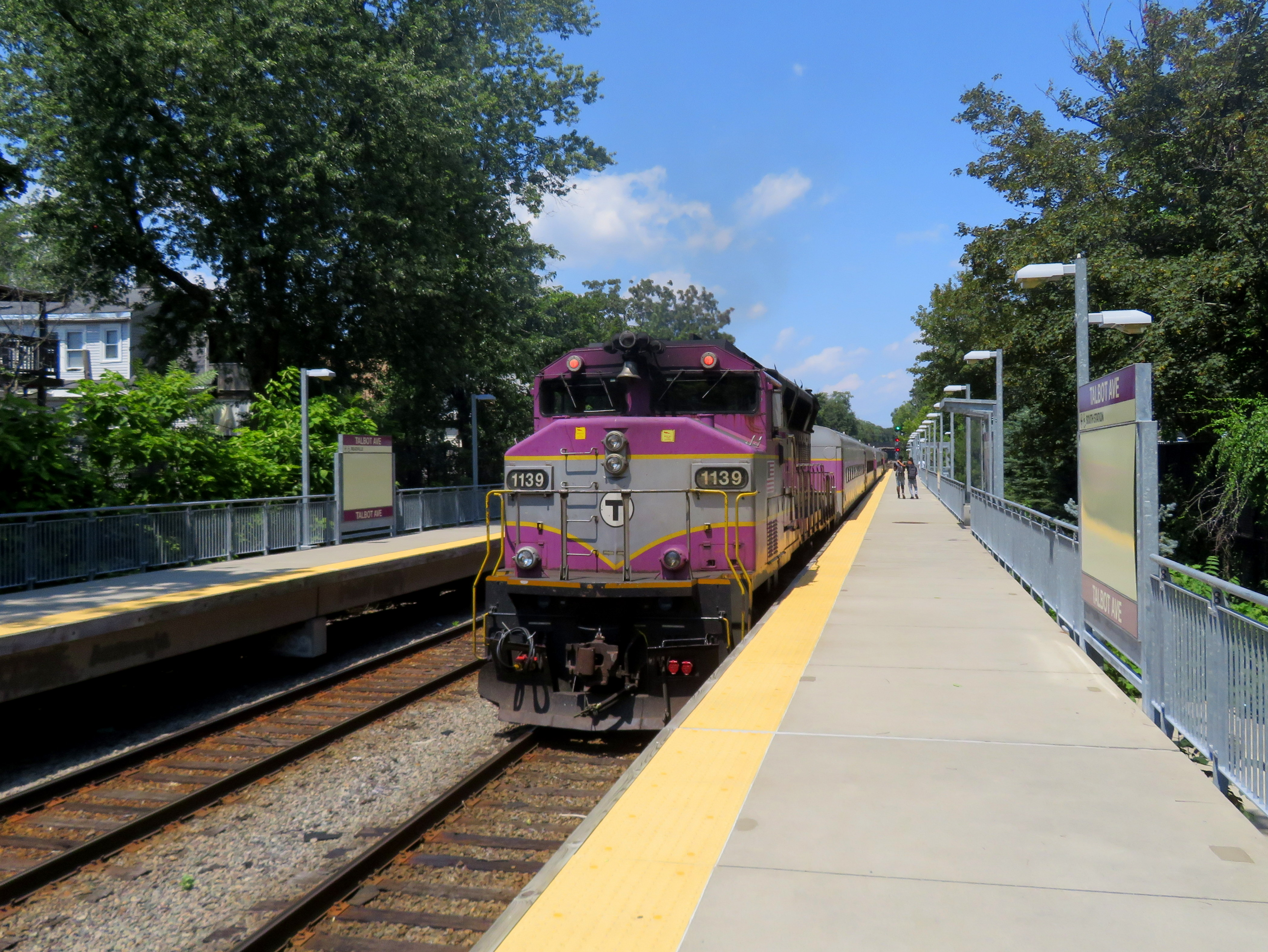
- An inbound train at Talbot Avenue station in July 2019

General information
- Location: 210 Talbot Avenue; Dorchester, Boston, Massachusetts
- Coordinates: 42.2932°N 71.0784°W
- Line: Dorchester Branch
- Platforms: 2 side platforms
- Tracks: 2
- Connections: MBTA bus: 22

Construction
- Accessible: yes

Other information
- Fare zone: 1A

History
- Opened: November 12, 2012

Passengers
- 2024: 427 daily boardings

Services
| Preceding station | MBTA | Following station |
|---|---|---|
| Morton Street toward Readville | Fairmount Line | Four Corners/Geneva toward South Station |
| Morton Street toward Forge Park/495 or Foxboro | Franklin/Foxboro Line | Four Corners/Geneva toward South Station |
Former services
Dorchester station
| Preceding station | New York, New Haven and Hartford Railroad | Following station |
|---|---|---|
| Forest Avenue toward Readville | Boston–Readville via Midland Branch | Harvard Street toward Boston |
Harvard Street station
| Dorchester toward Readville | Boston–Readville via Midland Branch | Mount Bowdoin toward Boston |
Location

Talbot Avenue station is an MBTA Commuter Rail station in Boston, Massachusetts. It serves the Fairmount Line. It is located near Codman Square in the Dorchester neighborhood. The station includes two full-length high-level platforms located north of Talbot Avenue, which are also accessible from Park Street and West Park Street. The station opened on November 12, 2012, as the first of four new stations on the Fairmount Line. Talbot Avenue was the first completely new rail station to open in the City of Boston since Yawkey opened in 1988.

== History ==
=== Previous service ===
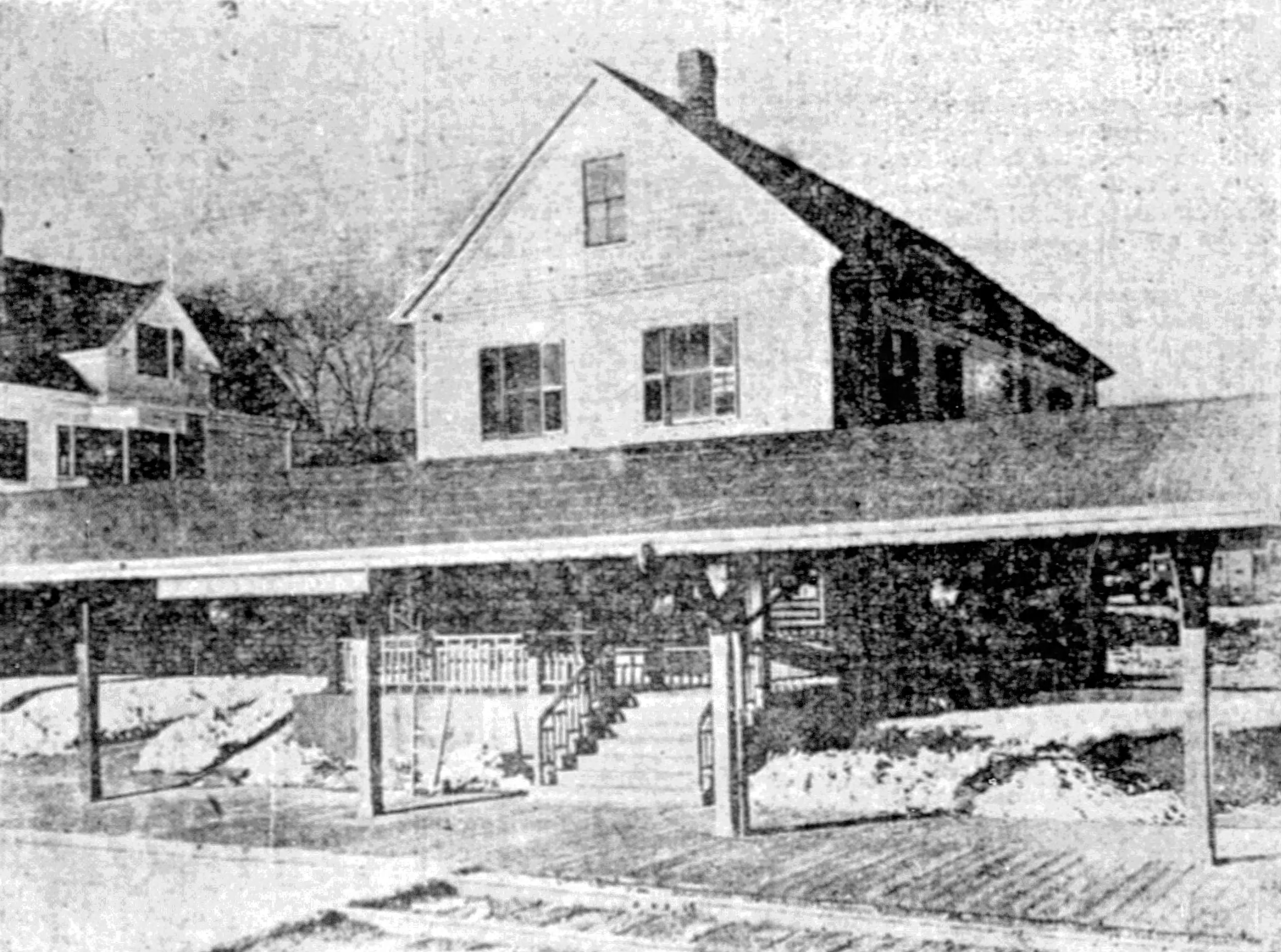
Harvard Street station in January 1903

Service on the Fairmount Line (as the Dorchester Branch of the Norfolk County Railroad and later the New York and New England Railroad and New York, New Haven and Hartford Railroad) began in 1855 and lasted until 1944. Stations were located at Harvard Street (Carlton) and Dorcester (at Woodrow Avenue), which are one quarter-mile to the north and south of the new station site.

The grade crossing at Harvard Street was replaced by a road bridge by the late 19th century, while Park Street was severed at the tracks. (Note: The Harvard Street bridge is shown on an 1880 map, and atlases from 1894 and after, but not in 1884 and 1889 atlases. Park Street is shown severed in the 1889 atlas, and atlases from 1899 and after, but not in the 1884 and 1894 atlases.) Talbot Avenue was extended from Codman Square to Blue Hill Avenue in 1897, with an underpass of the railroad tracks. Lauriat Avenue (now Woodrow Avenue) was lowered under the tracks adjacent to Dorchester station around 1899.

A new Harvard Street station – a converted house on the east side of the tracks – was placed into service on January 1, 1903. The old station building across the tracks remained in use for some time afterwards; a footbridge was constructed over the tracks by 1904. By 1906, Dorchester station was the outer terminus for some short turn trains on the line.

=== Restoration and plans ===
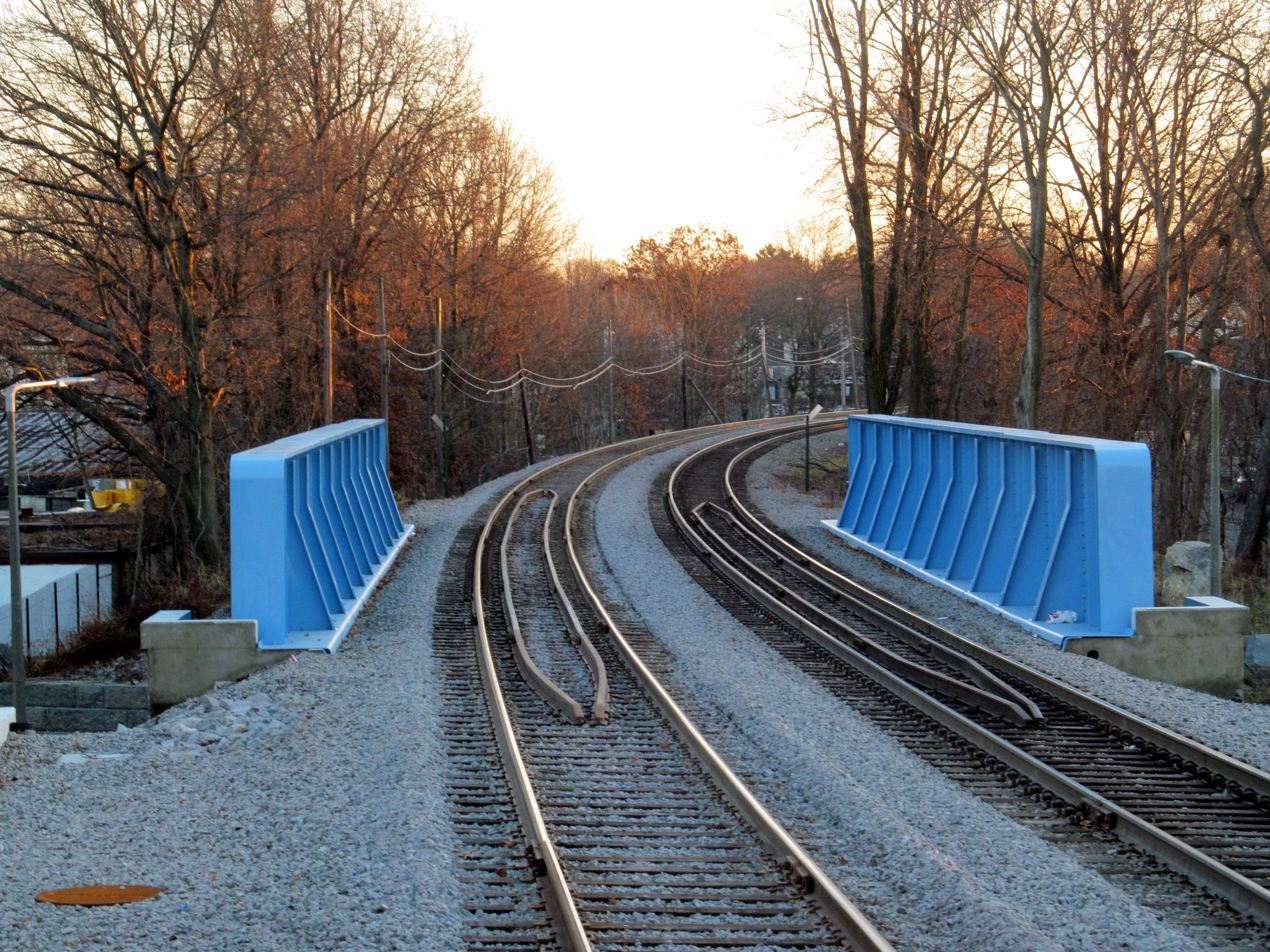
The bridge over Talbot Avenue was replaced in a single weekend in December 2011

Temporary shuttle service resumed on the Fairmount Line in 1979 during Southwest Corridor construction, with stops at Uphams Corner, Morton Street, and Fairmount. The MBTA planned to drop the shuttle after service resumed on the Southwest Corridor in 1987, but the service was locally popular and the Fairmount Line became a permanent part of the system.

A plan called the Indigo Line was later advanced by community activists in which the line would add stations and more frequent service to closely resemble a conventional rapid transit line. The Indigo Line plan was not adopted, but elements of it were included when the Commonwealth of Massachusetts agreed in 2005 to make improvements on the Fairmount Line part of its legally binding commitment to mitigate increased air pollution from the Big Dig. Among the selected improvements in the Fairmount Line Improvements project were four new commuter rail stations on the line, including one at Talbot Avenue as well as Newmarket, Four Corners/Geneva, and Blue Hill Avenue. The stations were originally to be completed by the end of 2011.

=== Talbot Avenue station ===
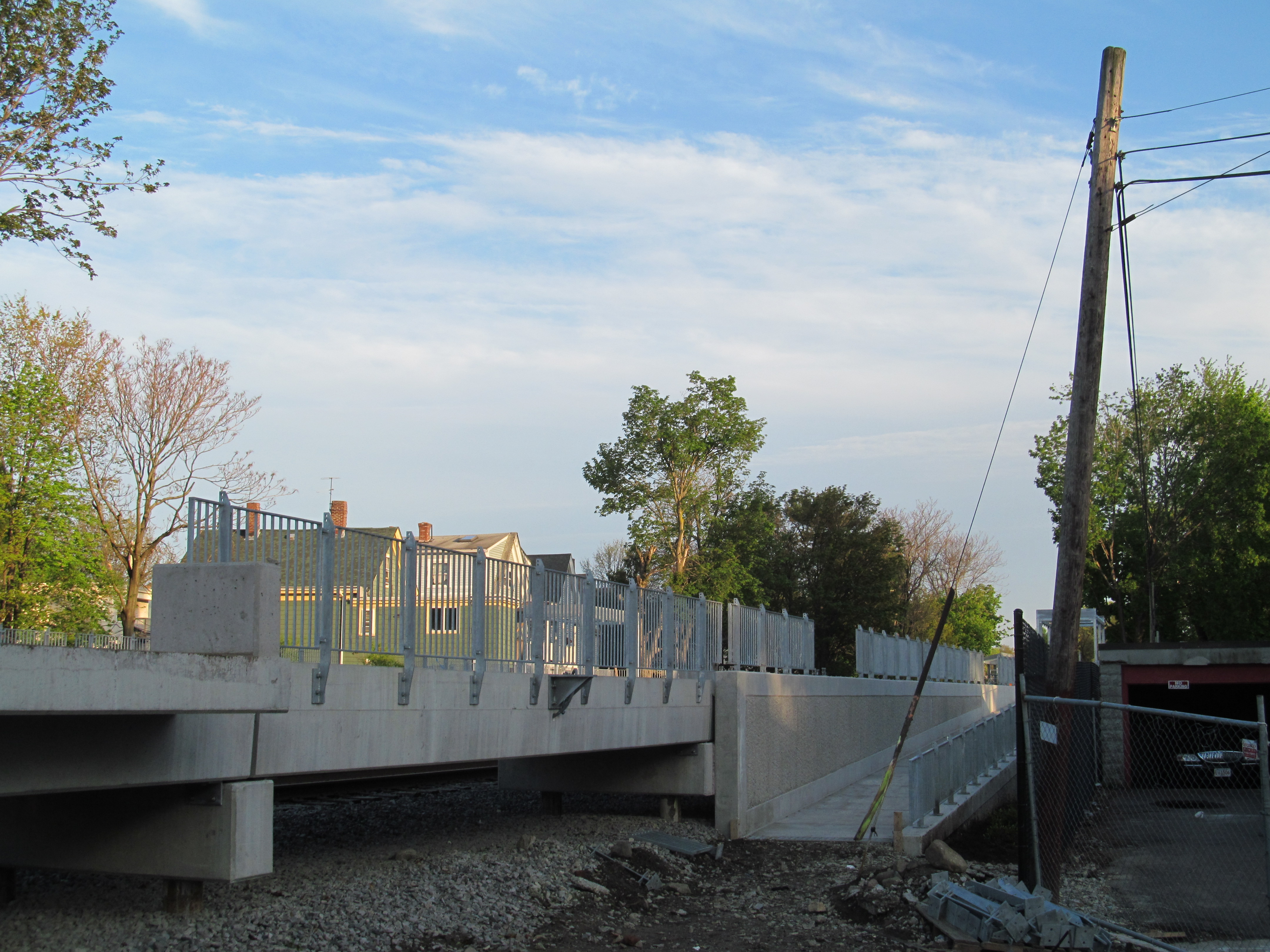
Outbound platform under construction in May 2012

A $15.9 million contract for construction of the station and the replacement of the adjacent Talbot Avenue overpass was awarded in August 2010. Construction began in November 2010, with a footbridge connecting Park Street to West Park Street removed in December. An official groundbreaking was held in June 2011. The bridge over Talbot Avenue was replaced during the third weekend of December 2011, using techniques developed in MassDOT's Fast 14 highway bridge replacement program.

The station was 80% complete by April 2012. By September, the station was 92% finished, with only minor cosmetic work remaining. On September 13, the MBTA announced that the station was planned to open in October 2012. The station did not open in October; on November 7, the MBTA announced the opening date. The station opened on schedule on November 12, 2012. In April 2013, a 6-foot fence on both platforms was erected in response to privacy concerns from residents of abutting properties. Ribbon-cutting ceremonies were held at Newmarket, Four Corners/Geneva, and Talbot Avenue on July 17, 2013.
