= Indigo Line =

Canceled Greater Boston urban rail transit service

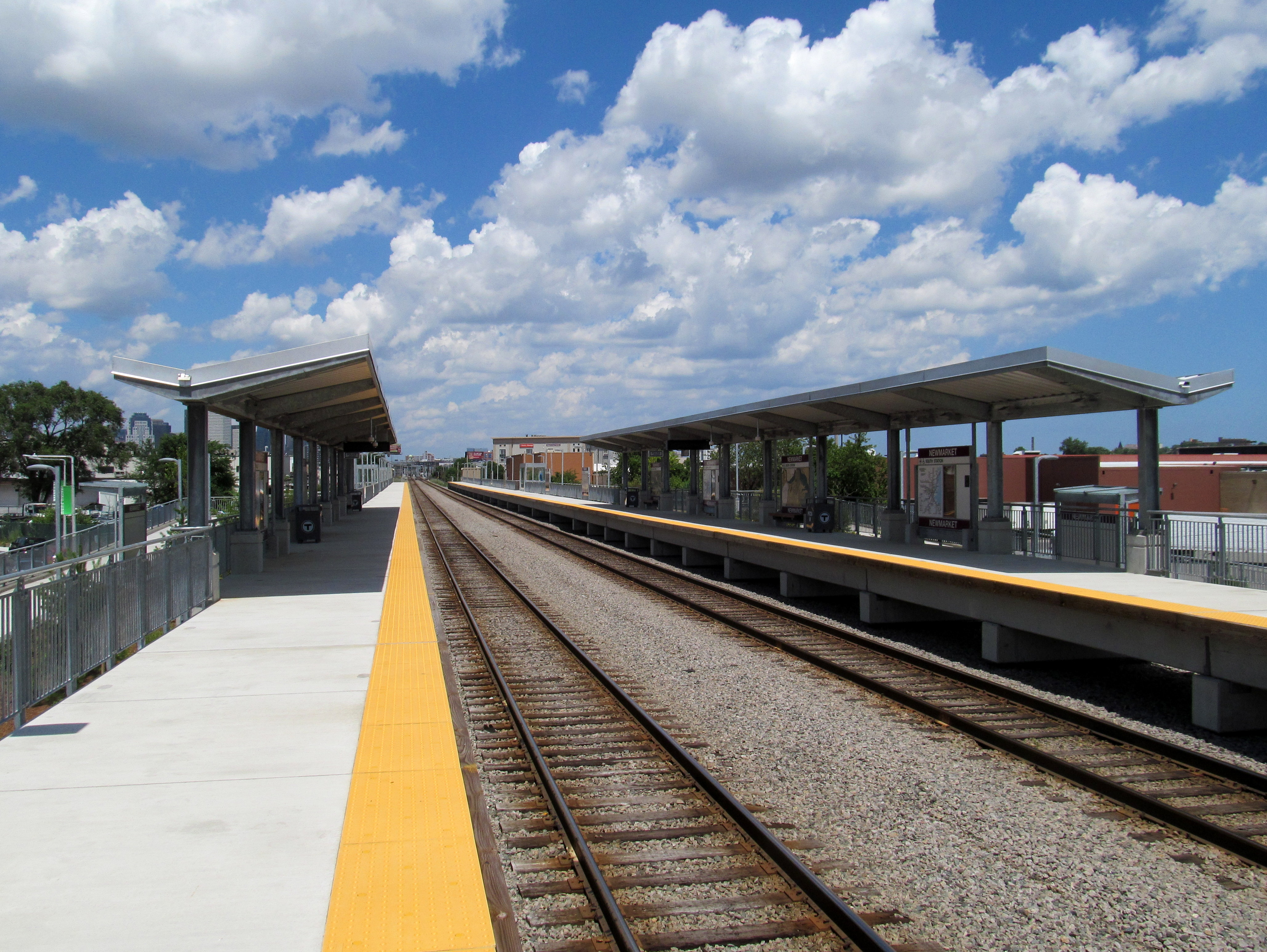
- The Fairmount Line of the MBTA Commuter Rail system was one of several rail lines considered for Indigo Line service in 2014

Overview
- Status: Canceled
- Owner: MBTA
- Locale: Greater Boston

Service
- Type: Initially hybrid rail, later commuter rail
- System: Massachusetts Bay Transportation Authority
- Operator: MBTA
- Rolling stock: Diesel multiple units (procurement canceled 2015)

History
- Opened: Proposed 2024 (canceled)

Technical
- Character: Surface-level
- Track gauge: 4 ft 8 1/2 in (1,435 mm) standard gauge

The Indigo Line was a proposed urban rail transit service of the Massachusetts Bay Transportation Authority (MBTA) that would have incorporated parts of the former Grand Junction Railroad, the Seaport District's Track 61, a spur to Riverside station and segments of other MBTA Commuter Rail lines within the Greater Boston region of Massachusetts. As proposed, the Indigo Line would have predominately shared existing infrastructure with the MBTA Commuter Rail.

The Indigo Line was formally endorsed in 2014 during the Deval Patrick administration. The service was included within the Massachusetts Department of Transportation's (MassDOT's) 2014-2018 Capital Investment Plan which consolidated recommendations put forth by the Boston Redevelopment Authority (now the Boston Planning and Development Agency) and several other proposals by community advocates. The MBTA planned to procure diesel multiple units (DMUs) for Indigo Line service with full-build completion projected for 2024.

Despite initial planning efforts, the project faced financial, political, and logistical hurdles. The Baker administration blocked funding for the Indigo Line in 2015, with the project being officially canceled by the MBTA shortly after. In the years following the project's cancelation, lawmakers and local advocates have called for the revival and reassessment of the Indigo Line plan in relation to improvements to the MBTA Commuter Rail's Fairmount Line. Several minor projects based on preliminary Indigo Line recommendations have been pursued; however, the Indigo Line project as originally proposed has been abandoned.

== Background ==
=== Early history ===
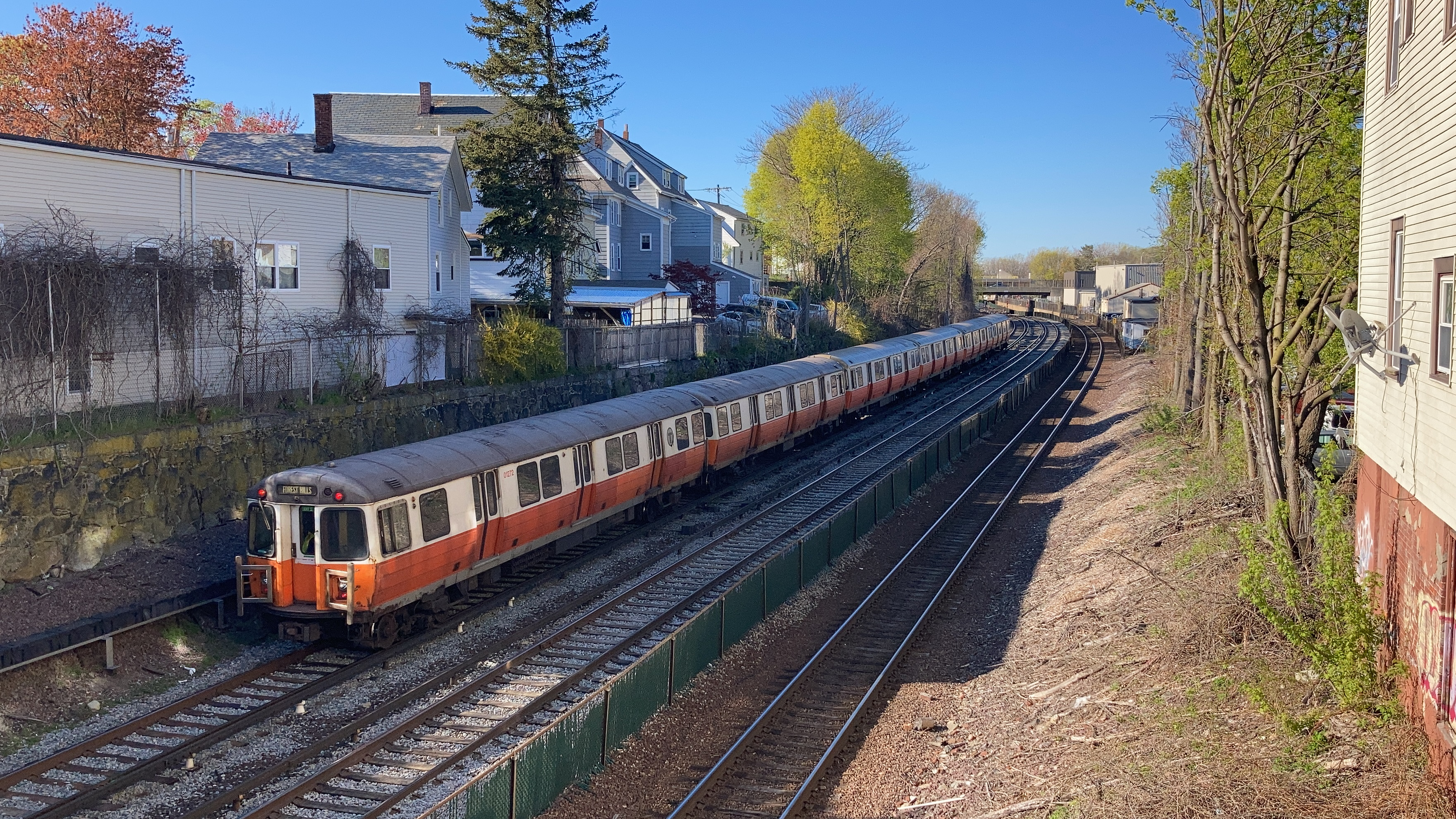
The Orange Line runs adjacent to the Haverhill Commuter Rail line; the Indigo Line would have instead operated directly on Commuter Rail trackage

Conversion of underutilized rail infrastructure within the Greater Boston area into regional rail or light rail services has been discussed for several decades, mostly about the Fairmount Line. The MBTA has traditionally extended rapid transit lines adjacent to existing suburban railroad rights-of-way to provide increased frequencies within Greater Boston (as with the Green Line Extension, Red Line Braintree Extension, and the Haymarket North Extension). In the case of the Green Line D Branch, a commuter line (the Highland Branch) was fully converted into a streetcar rapid transit line. The Indigo Line proposal was intended to make the characteristics of existing commuter lines more like rapid transit than commuter rail, with increased frequency and number of stops through the use of DMUs (which operate as self-propelled railcars without the need for an auxiliary electrification system) without incurring the costs associated with extending subway or light rail lines.

Prior to the formal endorsement of the Indigo Line, several planning initiatives during the 2000s would serve as the basis for the DMU proposal. Part of the environmental mitigation negotiated by the Conservation Law Foundation (CLF) for the Big Dig was improved commuter rail service on the Fairmount Line; following advocacy for the Fairmount Corridor Coalition (later the Fairmount Indigo Transit Coalition) in 1999-2000, the MBTA pledged half of the money necessary to build additional stations along the Fairmount Line in 2002. The remaining necessary funds were put into the MassDOT budget in 2005-06 following a lawsuit by the CLF for inadequate completion of Big Dig mitigation measures. The existing Uphams Corner and Morton Street stations were rebuilt, and four new stations were constructed at Four Corners/Geneva, Talbot Avenue, Blue Hill Avenue, and Newmarket in the 2010s; however, no plans were included to increase service on the line. While plans for the station improvement projects moved forward, community advocates would call for the conversion of the Fairmount Line to rapid transit.

Early plans to establish rapid DMU service within Boston stems from early Urban Ring planning within the Allston Multimodal Station Study (what would later become the West Station proposal) in 2007. The study analyzed both commuter rail and DMU local service along the Framingham/Worcester Line corridor, with potential stops at Faneuil, Market Street, Everett Street, Cambridge Street, West (Ashford Street), and Commonwealth Avenue. The final recommendation called for a commuter rail station at Everett Street with DMU stops added later at the other locations.

=== Indigo Line proposal ===
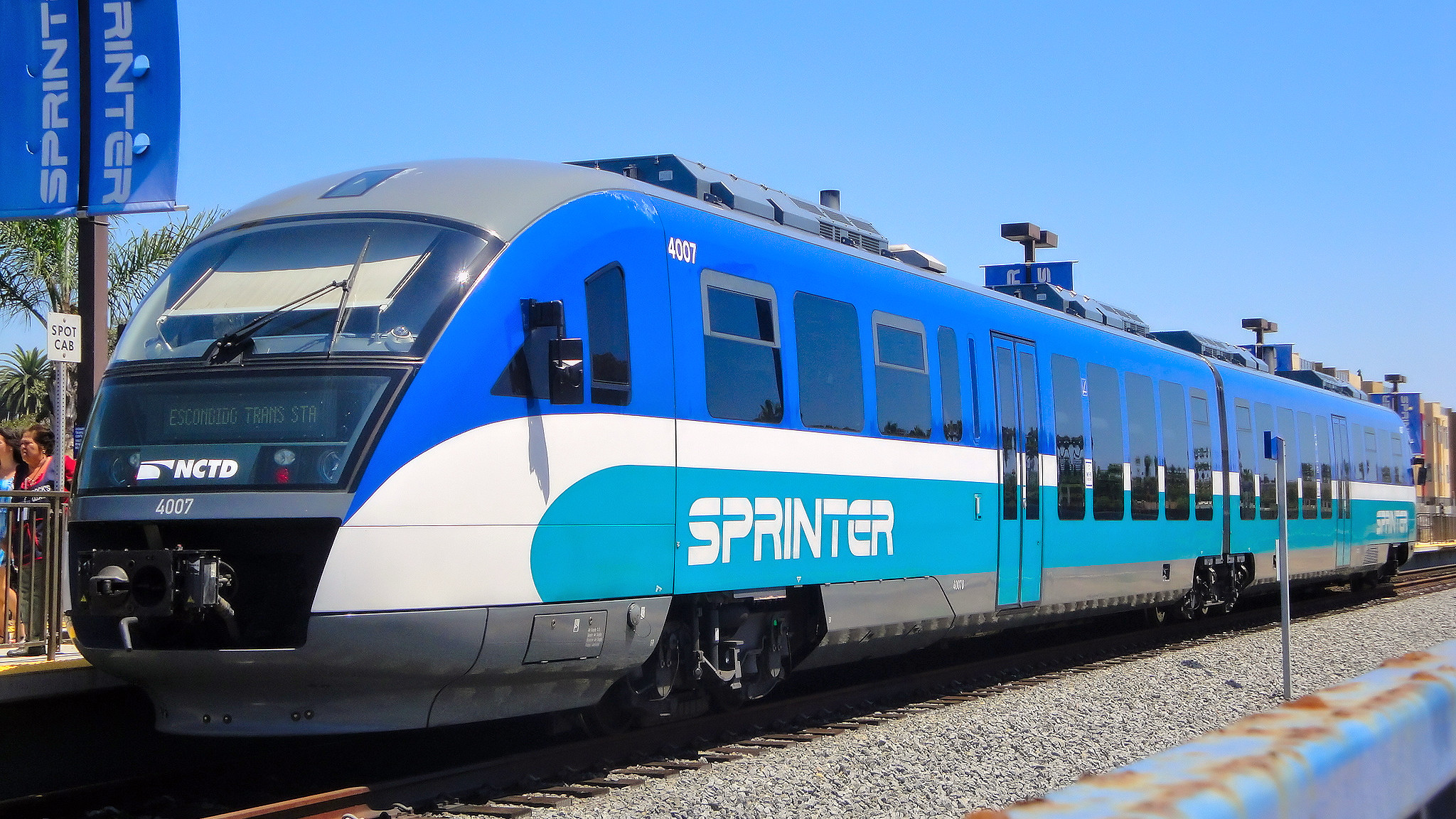
The Indigo Line was proposed as a hybrid rail service with lightweight DMUs, similar to San Diego County's Sprinter service

The term "Indigo Line" dates back to The Fairmount/Indigo Corridor Collaborative (FCC) community campaign in 2004 which advocated for expanded service on the Fairmount Line; however, official development of the proposal would be established with the creation of the Fairmount Indigo Planning Initiative in 2012. This study was facilitated by the Boston Redevelopment Authority which recommended transforming the Fairmount Line into a hybrid rail service. Hybrid rail, which emerged during the early 2000s with systems such as New Jersey Transit's River Line, was intended to be a low cost alternative to implementing high-frequency services on existing right-of-ways through the use of FRA non-compliant DMUs. The Indigo Line concept would be further consolidated with other DMU proposals with the intent to upgrade several other lines beyond the Fairmount Line. The "Indigo" terminology for the service was intended to denote it within Boston's rapid transit network, which utilizes a color-labeled nomenclature, since it would be operationally separate from the purple-denoted MBTA Commuter Rail network.

In 2014, the Indigo Line was formally endorsed by Governor Deval Patrick. The project was included as a capital project within MassDOT's annual five-year capital plan; however, no capital funding was allocated. The proposal was further outlined within the "MBTA Vision for 2024" proposal that same year. Within the Vision for 2024 plan, the MBTA reciprocated the recommendation to operate Indigo Line services as hybrid rail, with Fairmount Line DMU service being fully operational that year with leased equipment. The full buildout of the Indigo Line network was projected for completion by 2024 at a total capital cost of $252 million.

== Proposed service ==
=== Operations ===
The Indigo Line would have functionally operated as a part of the MBTA's rapid transit network alongside the Red, Blue, Green, Silver, and Ashmont-Mattapan lines; however, DMU operations would be subjected to FRA operational requirements, not FTA, due to shared operations with conventional commuter trains. DMUs would operate with 15 to 30 minute bidirectional headways and would have implemented a pre-pay fare control system at Indigo Line stations and have fare parity with the MBTA’s subway lines. In concept, the Indigo Line proposal is reminiscent of S-Bahn and other regional rail systems in Europe that often act as a faster counterparts to metro services which have more stops; however, Indigo services would have only provided coverage within Boston's urban periphery and lacks any form of through-running between lines.

DMU services would have primarily been contained to Boston's inner core, with some services extending into several adjacent suburbs and cities such as Lynn and Newton. As proposed, several inner-city Commuter Rail stations would have been converted exclusively for Indigo Line service. Conventional commuter rail would continue to serve outer stations and would run express through the new DMU lines.

=== Routes considered ===
The MBTA Vision for 2024 map proposed six possible lines to be upgraded for Indigo Line DMU service:

- Fairmount Branch: The current Fairmount Line would be converted into DMU operations between South Station and Readville; all Fairmount Line stations would be converted exclusively for Indigo service.
- Riverside Branch: South Station to Riverside via the Framingham/Worcester Line and an old right of way from the mainline to Riverside that currently used for trolley operator training; Yawkey (since renamed to Lansdowne), Allston/Brighton (present-day Boston Landing), Newtonville, West Newton, and Auburndale stations would have exclusively been converted to Indigo-only service. Riverside was last served by conventional commuter services in 1977.
- Exhibition Branch: Back Bay to a new station at the Boston Convention and Exhibition Center (labeled as BCEC station in proposal documents) using Track 61. The service would have operated exclusively as a rail shuttle between the two stations, and would have bypassed South Station.
- Cambridge Branch: North Station to a new West Station using the Grand Junction Railroad, with a new intermediate stop near Kendall Square.
- Woburn Branch: North Station to Anderson RTC on the Lowell Line; West Medford, Wedgemere, Winchester Center, and Mishawum would be exclusively served by Indigo service.
- Lynn Branch: North Station to Lynn on the Newburyport/Rockport Line; River Works station would be exclusively served by Indigo service.

=== Rolling stock ===
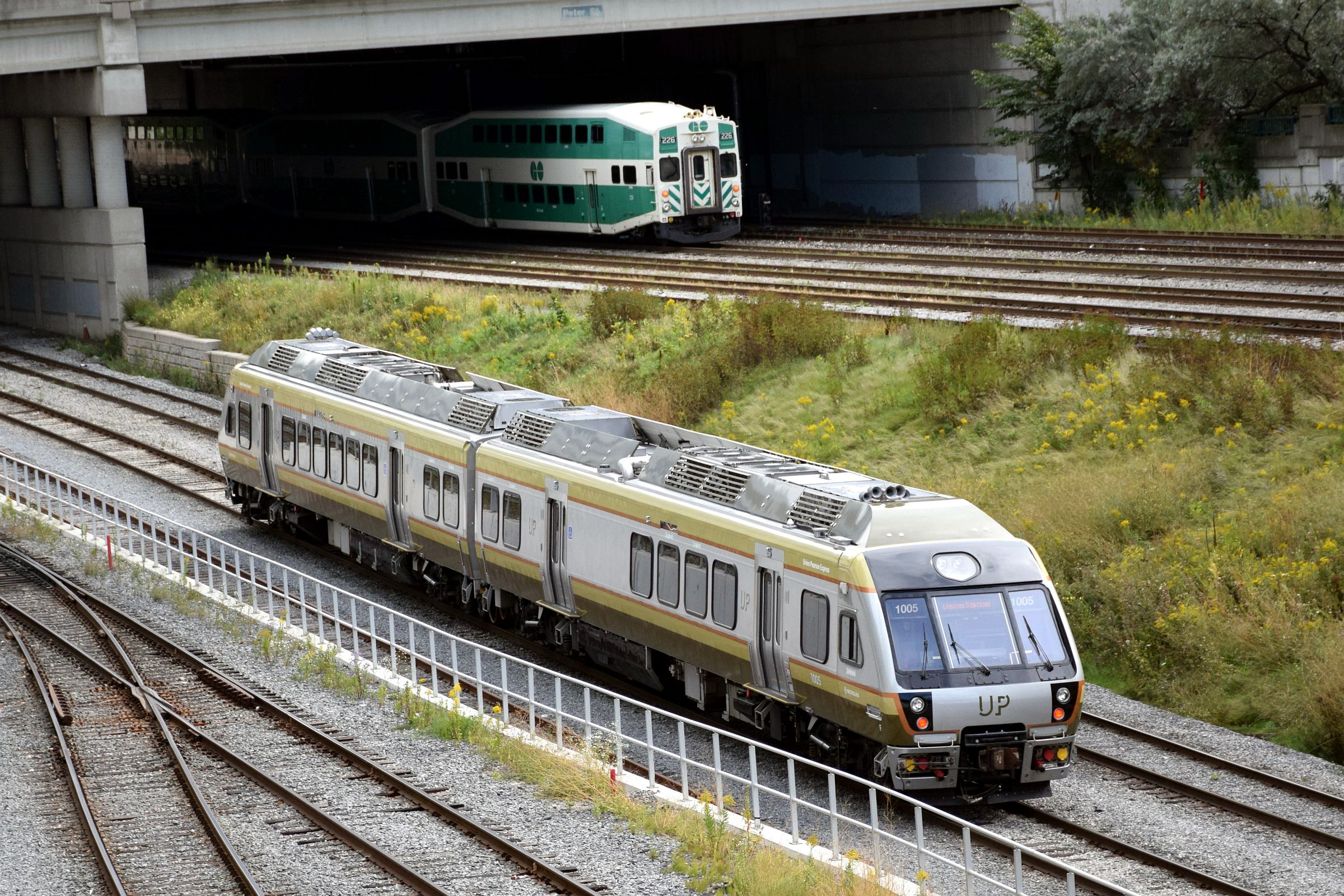
The Nippon Sharyo DMU was proposed for Indigo service

While the Indigo Line had always been planned as a DMU service, specifications would change throughout service development. Initial BRA proposals called for the use of FRA non-compliant rolling stock in order to reduce procurement and operational costs. Non-compliant DMUs are lighter than FRA compliant vehicles and often have low-floor boarding; however, they are not permitted to operate in mixed traffic with conventional rail equipment. Most hybrid rail lines operate temporally on trackage shared with freight or utilize a dedicated right-of-way; however, the MBTA had initially assumed that non-compliant railcars could operate alongside conventional commuter trains and not require modifications to existing commuter rail infrastructure.

By 2014, the MBTA determined that non-compliant DMUs would not be feasible for Indigo service due to logistical issues and FRA safety standards; DMUs would have to be compliant with FRA Tier 1 crashworthiness standards in order to operate on the existing MBTA Commuter Rail network. Additionally, DMUs would need to be compatible with high-floor boarding at stations which further increased procurement cost projections and would require the reconstruction of several stations. The proposed 2014 state budget included $240 million to purchase DMU railcars; the state issued a request for proposals to purchase 30 trainsets with deliveries starting in 2018. At the time, only one manufacturer offered FRA-compliant DMUs in North America– the Nippon Sharyo DMU, manufactured by Nippon Sharyo, would be the only respondent to the MBTA's proposal request. The lack of additional respondents was identified as a due diligence issue, as it negated the MBTA's ability to negotiate on price and delivery. Despite these concerns, an order of Nippon Sharyo DMUs for Sonoma–Marin Area Rail Transit in 2014 included an option for 18 cars to be provided to the MBTA for the Indigo Line service. The adoption of Nippon Sharyo DMUs, which are FRA-compliant, would have made the Indigo Line a conventional commuter rail service.

== Project cancelation ==
Development on the Indigo Line proposal immediately stalled following its inclusion as a capital project within MassDOT's five-year plan. Other projects, such as the Green Line Extension and South Coast Rail, received planning priority during the mid-2010s. The MBTA postponed DMU procurement multiple times due to increasing costs and the lack of available manufacturers. Fiscal issues, such as budget deficits, further postponed the Indigo Line proposal. The MBTA further deprioritized investment for the Indigo Line when the Charlie Baker administration started in January 2015.

Funding for the Indigo Line project was blocked by the Baker administration by late 2015, and all references to the project were omitted from MassDOT's 2015 Capital Investment Plan. The abandonment of the project was attributed to high costs of acquiring specialized rolling stock along with a lack of demand for the routes it would serve. Opposition to the Indigo Line proposal cited the low ridership of the Fairmount Line, and questioned the operational logistics of the proposed routes (mainly in reference to how Track 61 service would have bypassed South Station). In 2016, the MBTA stated it was no longer interested in pursuing inner-core service increases on existing Commuter Rail lines.

=== Community response ===
Following the cancelation of the Indigo Line, constituencies served by the Fairmount Line within Dorchester, Mattapan, and Hyde Park condemned the decision to cancel service improvements. The Fairmount corridor currently serves mostly low-income and working-class communities that are reliant on access to public transportation, and several of the communities are defined by the Massachusetts Executive Office of Energy and Environmental Affairs as Environmental Justice Communities. The Conservation Law Foundation, which had previously negotiated conditions for the Fairmount Line Improvement Project, accused the MBTA of disproportionally depriving the Fairmount Line of service improvements. The accusation came in response to a joint Department of Justice and FTA investigation of MBTA Commuter Rail operator Keolis into whether train cancelations on the Fairmount Line were in violation of Title VI in 2016.

Transit advocacy groups have been established in response to the cancelation of the Indigo Line project. The Fairmount Indigo CDC Collaborative, which includes partner organizations Codman Square NDC and Southwest Boston CDC, serves the predominantly low and moderate-income neighborhoods along the Fairmount Line from Hyde Park to North Dorchester in Boston. The Fairmount Corridor Transit Coalition, which had been previously established in 2004, continues to advocate for service improvements. The Fairmount Indigo Network is a consortium of several advocacy organizations (including the Fairmount Indigo CDC Collaborative) that lobbies for Fairmount Line improvements at the community level.

== Partial implementation ==
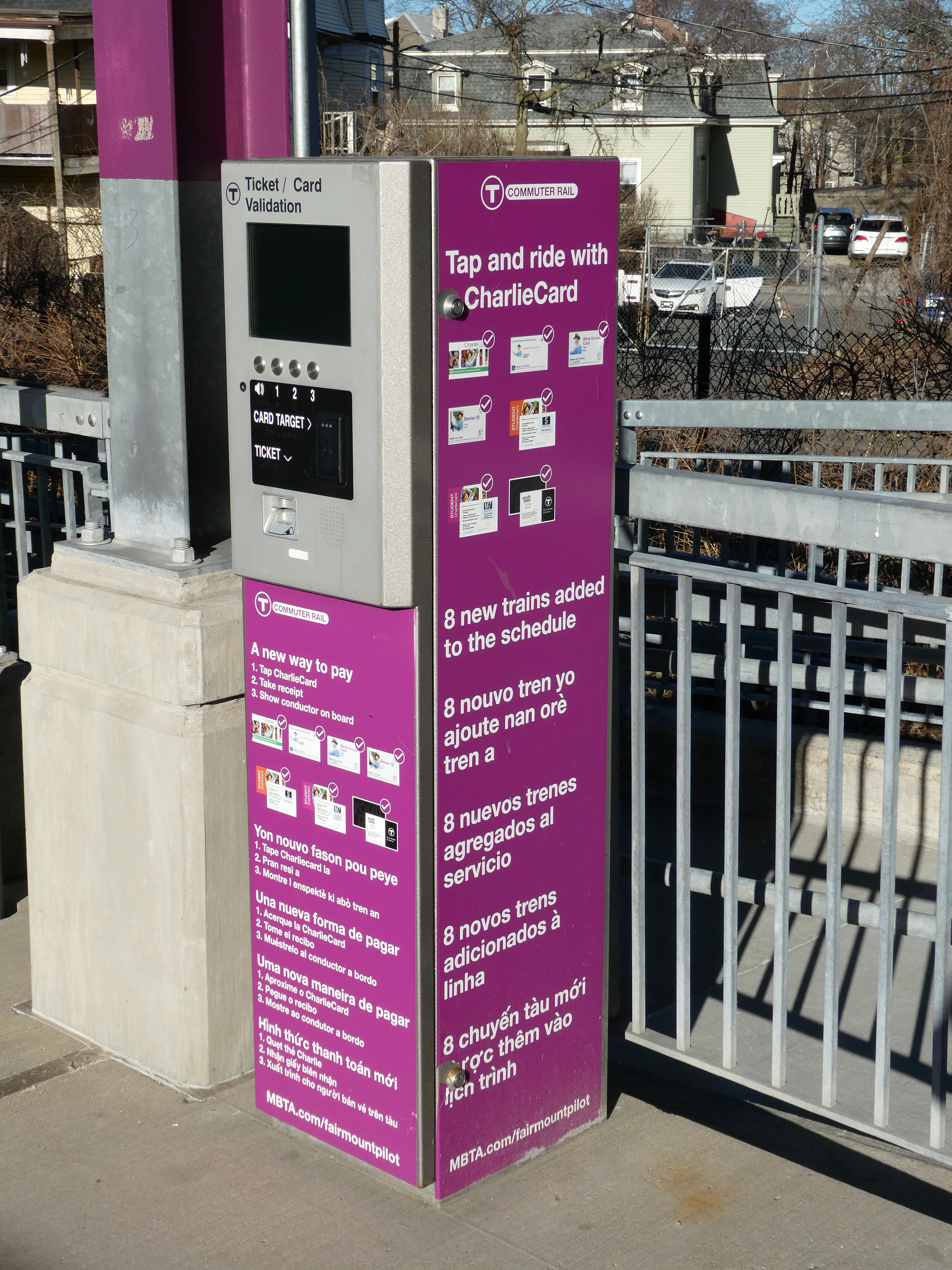
Fare validator at Uphams Corner station

Several elements proposed for the Indigo Line have been partially implemented on the Fairmount Line. The Fairmount Line Improvement Project adopted by the MBTA between 2012 and 2019 was based on preliminary Indigo Line plans; however, in its initial proposal the MBTA did not plan to increase service frequency to match rapid transit lines, nor to install pre-pay fare systems. The infill stations proposed by the initiative have been built; however, the line still uses conventional commuter rail equipment. In January 2020, CharlieCard readers were placed at stations to provide a proof-of-payment ticket that allows a transfer to subway or bus. On May 20, 2024, service on the line was increased to 30-minute headways (including weekends).

=== Regional rail proposals ===
As originally proposed, the Indigo Line is no longer in active development; however, many attributes of the project are succeeded within MBTA regional rail planning. By 2018, conversations surrounding the improvement of commuter rail services within Boston's periphery had shifted towards converting the existing MBTA Commuter Rail network into a high-frequency electrified regional rail network. Conversion to regional rail would negate the need for a separately designated service, as service enhancements would extend to all existing commuter lines. Between 2018 and 2019, the MBTA conducted an internal study of regional rail alternatives known as Rail Vision which recommended an urban rail concept (electrified rapid-transit frequencies within Greater Boston) and conventional regional rail options on longer lines, focusing on enhanced service on the busiest lines with the phased implementation of overhead electrification and electric multiple units. In 2019, the MBTA's Fiscal and Management Control Board (FMCB) approved a plan to transition the commuter rail system into the regional rail model based on the Rail Vision recommendations, which included endorsement for the preliminary electrification of the Fairmount Line and other sections of lines that had been previously proposed for Indigo service.

By the early 2020s, regional rail planning had largely stagnated. In June 2022, the MBTA indicated plans to purchase battery electric multiple units, with catenary for charging on part of the network. Service proposals called for discontinuous electric service on the Providence/Stoughton Line and Fairmount Line by 2028–29, followed by the Newburyport/Rockport Line in 2031; all lines would be electrified by 2050. On March 16, 2024, MBTA Commuter Rail operator Keolis solicited a proposal that outlined the implementation of 20-minute bidirectional BEMU services on the Fairmount Line by FY 2028 as leverage for contract renewal. In July 2024, the MBTA board approved the $54 million Fairmount Line proposal, with new BEMU equipment to enter service in early 2028. BEMU service on the Fairmount Line would be considered an MBTA Commuter Rail service, not a rapid transit service.

The Indigo Line terminology was revived in 2023 within both Senate and House versions of a bill that would mandate the conversion of the MBTA's Fairmount Line to fully electrified operations by 2029 in order to effectively integrate the line with the MBTA’s rapid transit network under the Indigo Line banner. The 2023 legislation diverges from a previous MBTA proposal from 2022 that suggested the procurement of battery multiple units for the Fairmount Line as opposed to full electrification. The legislation was included in a Joint Committee on Transportation hearing on May 8, 2023, which has since been referred to the House Ways and Means Committee. Ultimately, the legislation did not progress beyond the Massachusetts Senate.

== See also ==
- Urban Ring Project
- North-South Rail Link
