= Blue Hill Avenue station =

Train station in Boston, Massachusetts, US

Blue Hill Ave
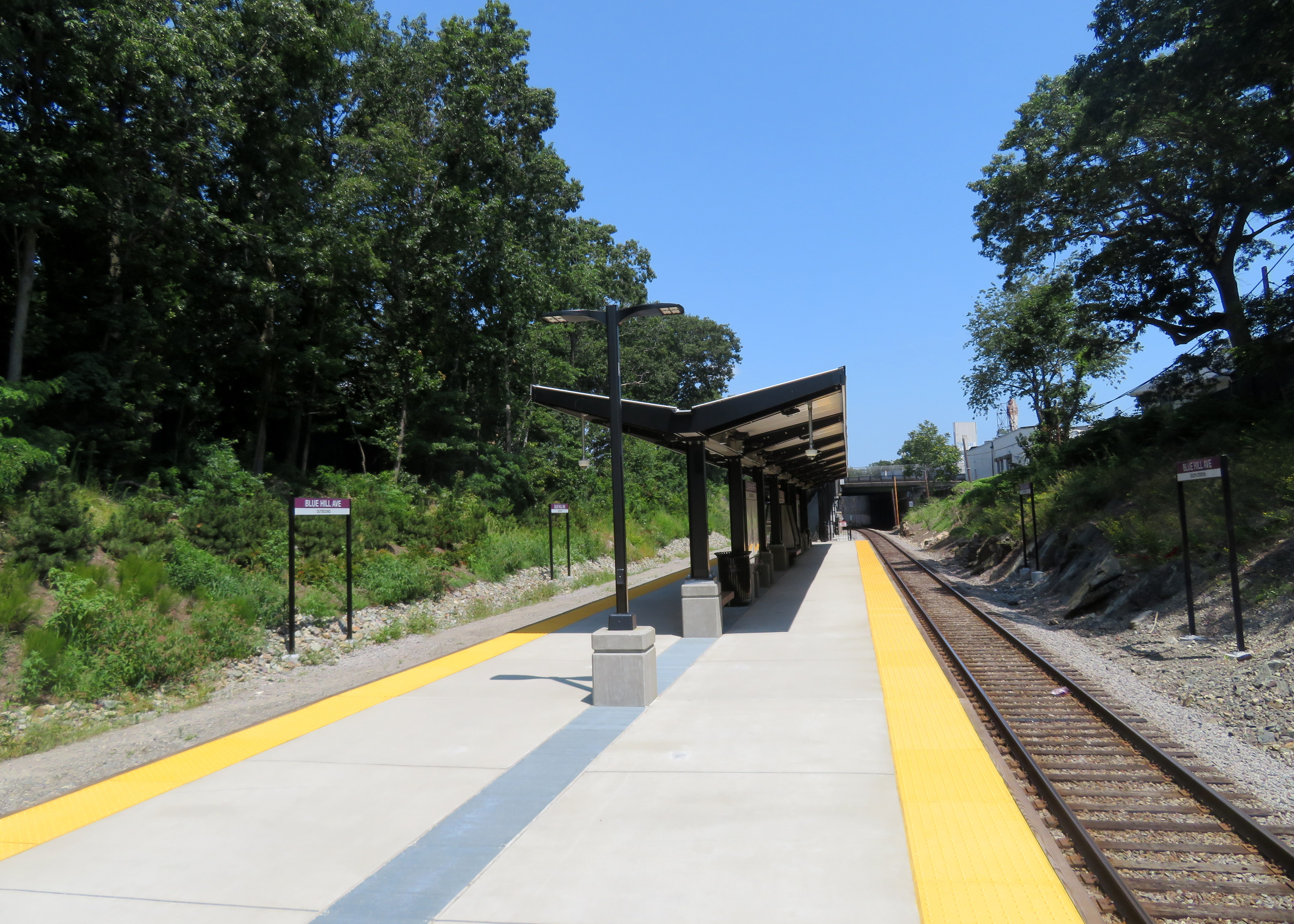
- Blue Hill Avenue station in July 2019

General information
- Location: Blue Hill Avenue at Woodhaven Street; Dorchester, Boston, Massachusetts
- Coordinates: 42.2714°N 71.0959°W
- Line: Dorchester Branch
- Platforms: 1 island platform
- Tracks: 2
- Connections: MBTA bus: 28, 29, 30, 31

Construction
- Accessible: yes

Other information
- Fare zone: 1A

History
- Opened: 1855; February 25, 2019
- Closed: March 12, 1944
- Former names: Mattapan (previous station)

Passengers
- 2024: 419 daily boardings

Services
Preceding station	MBTA	Following station
Fairmount toward Readville	Fairmount Line	Morton Street toward South Station
Fairmount toward Forge Park/495 or Foxboro	Franklin/Foxboro Line	Morton Street toward South Station
Former services
Preceding station	New York, New Haven and Hartford Railroad	Following station
River Street toward Readville	Boston–Readville via Midland Branch	Forest Avenue toward Boston
Location

Blue Hill Avenue station is a regional rail station on the MBTA Commuter Rail Fairmount Line located in the Mattapan neighborhood of Boston, Massachusetts. The station consists of a center island platform between the line's two tracks, with handicapped-accessible ramps to Blue Hill Avenue and Cummins Highway. Originally intended to open along with Newmarket, Four Corners/Geneva, and Talbot Avenue, it was significantly delayed due to local controversy. Construction began in 2017, and the station opened on February 25, 2019.

== History ==
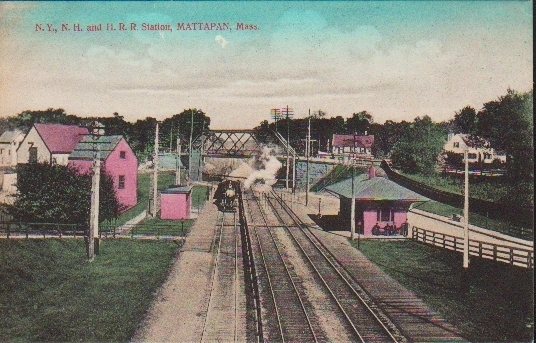
Early 20th century postcard of Mattapan station, near the modern station site

=== Previous service ===
Service on the Fairmount Line (as the Dorchester Branch of the Norfolk County Railroad and later the New York and New England Railroad and New York, New Haven and Hartford Railroad) began in 1855. A station called Mattapan was located at Blue Hill Avenue. The Norfolk Street (now Babson Street) grade crossing east of the station was replaced by a road bridge prior to 1874.

Blue Hill Avenue was improved and widened from Walk Hill Street to the Milton border in Mattapan in the late 1890s. As part of that project, the level crossings of Blue Hill Avenue and Oakland Street (now Cummins Highway) were replaced by road bridges in 1901. The station was moved about 100 feet (30 m) east to accommodate the road widening. It was renamed Blue Hill Avenue to distinguish it from the nearby Milton Branch station also called Mattapan. Service on the line ended in 1938 as part of the 88 stations case; it resumed in 1940 but again ended in 1944.

=== Improvement project ===
Temporary shuttle service resumed on the Fairmount Line in 1979 during Southwest Corridor construction, with stops at Uphams Corner, Morton Street, and Fairmount. The MBTA planned to drop the shuttle after service resumed on the Southwest Corridor in 1987, but the service was locally popular and the Fairmount Line became a permanent part of the system.

A plan called the "Indigo Line" was then advanced by community activists, who proposed a route that would add stations and more frequent service, to approach the standards of a conventional rapid transit line. The Indigo Line plan was not adopted, but elements of it were included when the Commonwealth of Massachusetts agreed in 2005 to make improvements on the Fairmount Line a part of its legally binding commitment to mitigate increased air pollution from the Big Dig. Among the selected improvements in the Fairmount Line Improvements project were four new commuter rail stations on the line, including one at Blue Hill Avenue. The stations were originally to be completed by the end of 2011.

=== Planning ===
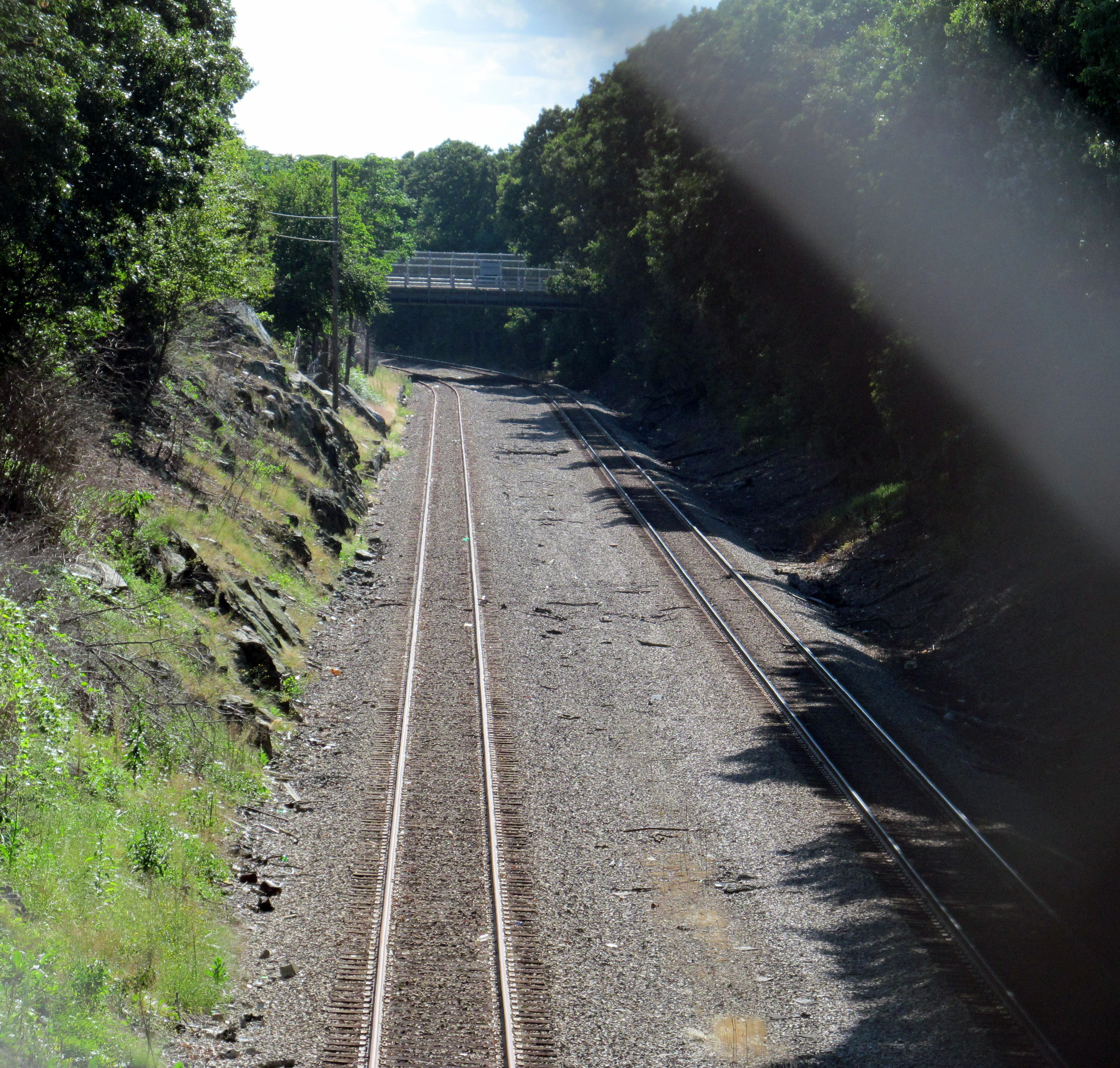
The planned station site in 2012

Three of the stations - Newmarket, Four Corners/Geneva, and Talbot Avenue - began construction in 2011 and opened in 2012 and 2013. However, Blue Hill Avenue has been the focus of major community opposition over the station site and design, which has resulted in significant delays. Originally, the station was to be located between Blue Hill Avenue and Cummins Highway, with two side platforms like the other stations on the line. However, property owners in a neighborhood association objected to the projected construction activity and operational noise, forcing a total redesign of the station.

The MBTA analyzed several alternative sites for the station. Sites east of Blue Hill Avenue, west of Cummins Highway, and west of River Street would have required property taking, while a location at River Street was on a curve too tight to allow a high-level platform without significant platform gaps. In May 2011, the MBTA decided to keep the station site between Blue Hills Avenue and Cummins Highway, but to change the station design. The new design with a single island platform will keep construction further from abutting homes and lower the cost of the station. However, the change did not satisfy all residents, and the debate continued after announcement of the decision.

Final design of the station, including analyzing 26 nearby homes for noise abatement, was expected to be completed in the middle of 2012. However, local elected officials demanded an independent design review of the project, further delaying the project to at least 2015. The MBTA had planned to advertise the $10 million construction contract in December 2012, but did not do so. In July 2013, the MBTA announced that construction would begin within several months, but again this was a false start. A public meeting held in April 2014 showed mixed local opinions about the stations, with some nearby residents feeling that the stop was imposed on the neighborhood by the MBTA without sufficient public input. At that meeting, the MBTA presented a plan under which construction would begin in May 2015 for a December 2016 opening. A later meeting in September 2014 adjusted the schedule, with construction beginning in September 2015 for a June 2017 opening.

In July 2015, the MBTA began soliciting proposals for artists to design four panels on station signs. One-half percent of the construction cost, approximately $70,000, is budgeted to pay the artists. By February 2016, final design was expected to be completed in the first half of 2016. However, no funding was yet available for the $25.2 million construction cost, placing the station's future in doubt. Plans for 100% design were submitted in March 2016. In June 2016, the Massachusetts Department of Transportation board approved a $14.8 billion 5-year Capital Investment Plan. Under the plan, Blue Hill Ave station had guaranteed funding for the $26 million construction cost. Over $3 million was allotted in FY2017, with the remaining $22 million to between FY2018 and FY2021.

=== Construction ===
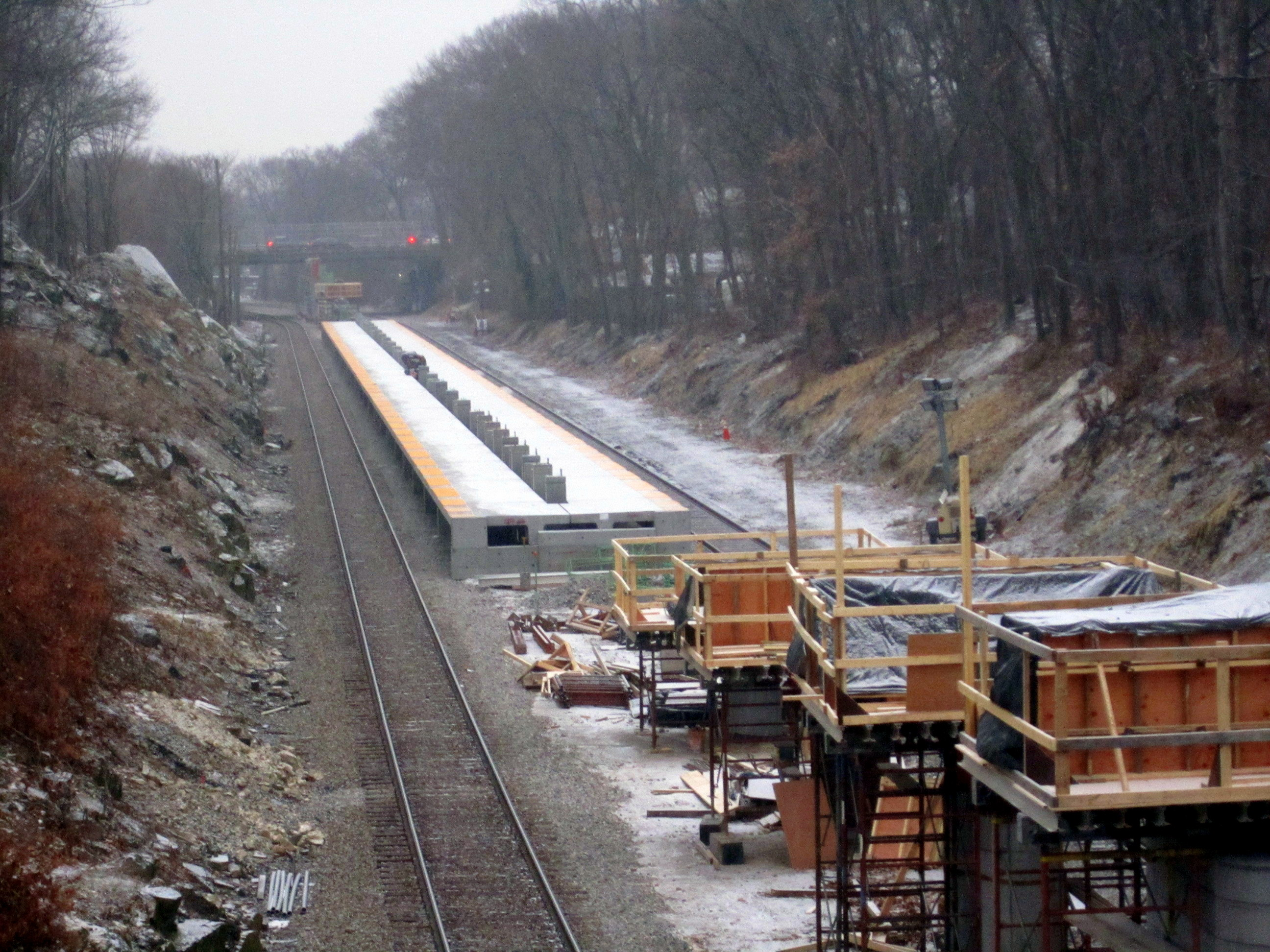
The station under construction in December 2017

Bidding for the $19.3 million main construction contract opened in December 2016. On January 24, 2017, the MBTA Fiscal Management and Control Board approved a $16.97 million contract. Construction was to begin in Spring 2017 for a Spring 2019 opening.

Construction of the station began on June 3, 2017. To accommodate construction work at the station site, all weekend Fairmount Line trains in both directions were cut back to Morton Street, with bus shuttles between Morton Street, Fairmount, and Readville, and late-night outbound Fairmount Line service on weekdays was completely replaced with buses. The station opened on February 25, 2019. A formal ribbon-cutting ceremony was held on March 6. Blue Hill Avenue originally had bike racks, however they were removed the day before opening. Travel time from Blue Hill Avenue to downtown (South Station) was scheduled for 23 minutes - a substantial reduction from the 45-60 minutes common when using the Red Line or buses. By 2024, the station had 419 daily riders, higher than projections of 290 daily riders.
