= Four Corners/Geneva station =

Train station in Dorchester, Boston, US

Four Corners/Geneva
- An inbound train at the station in 2026

General information
- Location: 171 Geneva Avenue; Dorchester, Boston, Massachusetts
- Coordinates: 42.3050°N 71.0770°W
- Line: Dorchester Branch
- Platforms: 2 side platforms
- Tracks: 2
- Connections: MBTA bus: 19, 23

Construction
- Accessible: yes

Other information
- Fare zone: 1A

History
- Opened: July 1, 2013
- Former names: Mount Bowdoin (closed 1944)

Passengers
- 2024: 424 daily boardings

Services
Preceding station	MBTA	Following station
Talbot Avenue toward Readville	Fairmount Line	Uphams Corner toward South Station
Talbot Avenue toward Forge Park/495 or Foxboro	Franklin/Foxboro Line	Uphams Corner toward South Station
Former services
Preceding station	New York, New Haven and Hartford Railroad	Following station
Harvard Street toward Readville	Boston–Readville via Midland Branch	Bird Street toward Boston
Location

Four Corners/Geneva station is an MBTA Commuter Rail station in Boston, Massachusetts. It serves the Fairmount Line. It is located in the Mount Bowdoin section of the Dorchester neighborhood. The new station was being built as part of the Fairmount Line Improvement Project, which included four new stations as well as infrastructure upgrades. It has two full-length high-level platforms with walkways connecting them to Washington Street and Geneva Avenue. Four Corners/Geneva Ave opened on July 1, 2013, along with Newmarket.

== History ==
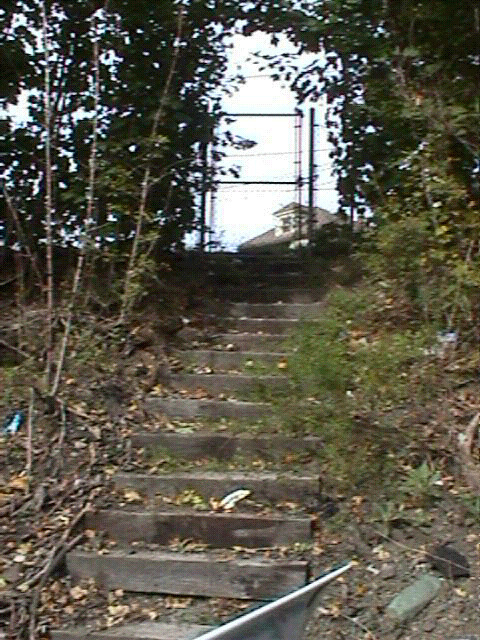
Steps leading to the former Mt. Bowdoin platform

=== Mt. Bowdoin ===
Service on the Fairmount Line (as the Dorchester Branch of the Norfolk County Railroad and later the New York and New England Railroad and New York, New Haven and Hartford Railroad) began in 1855 and lasted until 1944. A station named Mt. Bowdoin was located near the Washington Street overpass. The area around the station was largely developed between 1895 and 1916. Originally one story, the small inbound station building was awkwardly modified with a second story below street level when the tracks were lowered to eliminate problematic grade crossings. There was a small shelter on the outbound side; a set of wooden steps leading to the outbound side are still extant.

=== Restoration and planning ===
Temporary shuttle service resumed on the Fairmount Line in 1979 during Southwest Corridor construction, with stops at Uphams Corner, Morton Street, and Fairmount. The MBTA planned to drop the shuttle after service resumed on the Southwest Corridor in 1987, but the service was locally popular and the Fairmount Line became a permanent part of the system. A plan called the Indigo Line was later advanced by community activists in which the line would add stations and more frequent service to closely resemble a conventional rapid transit line. The Indigo Line plan was not adopted, but elements of it were included when the Commonwealth of Massachusetts agreed in 2005 to make improvements on the Fairmount Line part of its legally binding commitment to mitigate increased air pollution from the Big Dig. Among the selected improvements in the Fairmount Line Improvements project were four new commuter rail stations on the line, including one at Geneva Avenue. The stations were originally to be completed by the end of 2011.

=== Construction ===
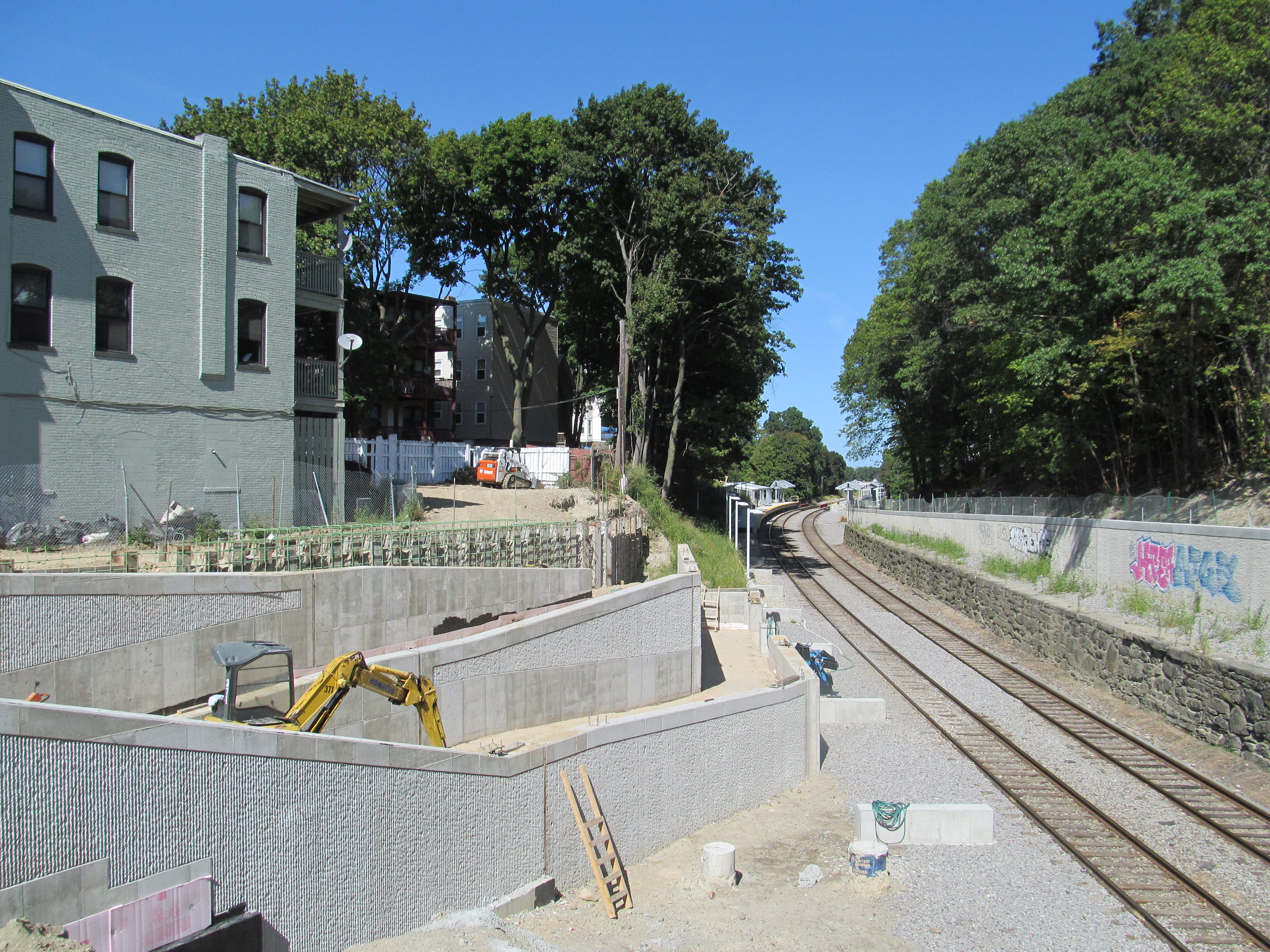
Ramp to the outbound platform from Washington Street under construction in September 2012

After several years of planning, the $19.6 million contract to build the station went out to bid on September 4, 2009; the low bid was $17.7 million. Notice to proceed was given on January 28, 2010. A groundbreaking ceremony was held on July 16, 2010.

The inbound platform and ramp were mostly complete by the end of 2011. By April 2012, the station was 75% complete, with the inbound platform and the Geneva Avenue ramp structures in place. Construction delays were caused by the need to redesign the outbound ramp to Washington Street due to a rock vein that was missed by test borings.

On September 13, 2012, the MBTA announced that the station was planned to open in April 2013. By mid-October, the station was at 82% completion. However, the opening was delayed to July 1, 2013, to match Newmarket for publicity purposes. Ribbon-cutting ceremonies were held at Newmarket, Four Corners/Geneva, and Talbot Avenue on July 17, 2013.
