= Blue Hill Avenue =

Blue Hill Avenue may refer to:

- Blue Hill Avenue, a major street in Roxbury and Dorchester
  - Massachusetts Route 28, its northern part
  - Massachusetts Route 138, its southern part
  - Blue Hill Avenue station, a station located on said avenue
- Blue Hill Avenue (film), a 2001 film named for said avenue
