= Newmarket station (MBTA) =

Train station in Boston, Massachusetts, US

Newmarket
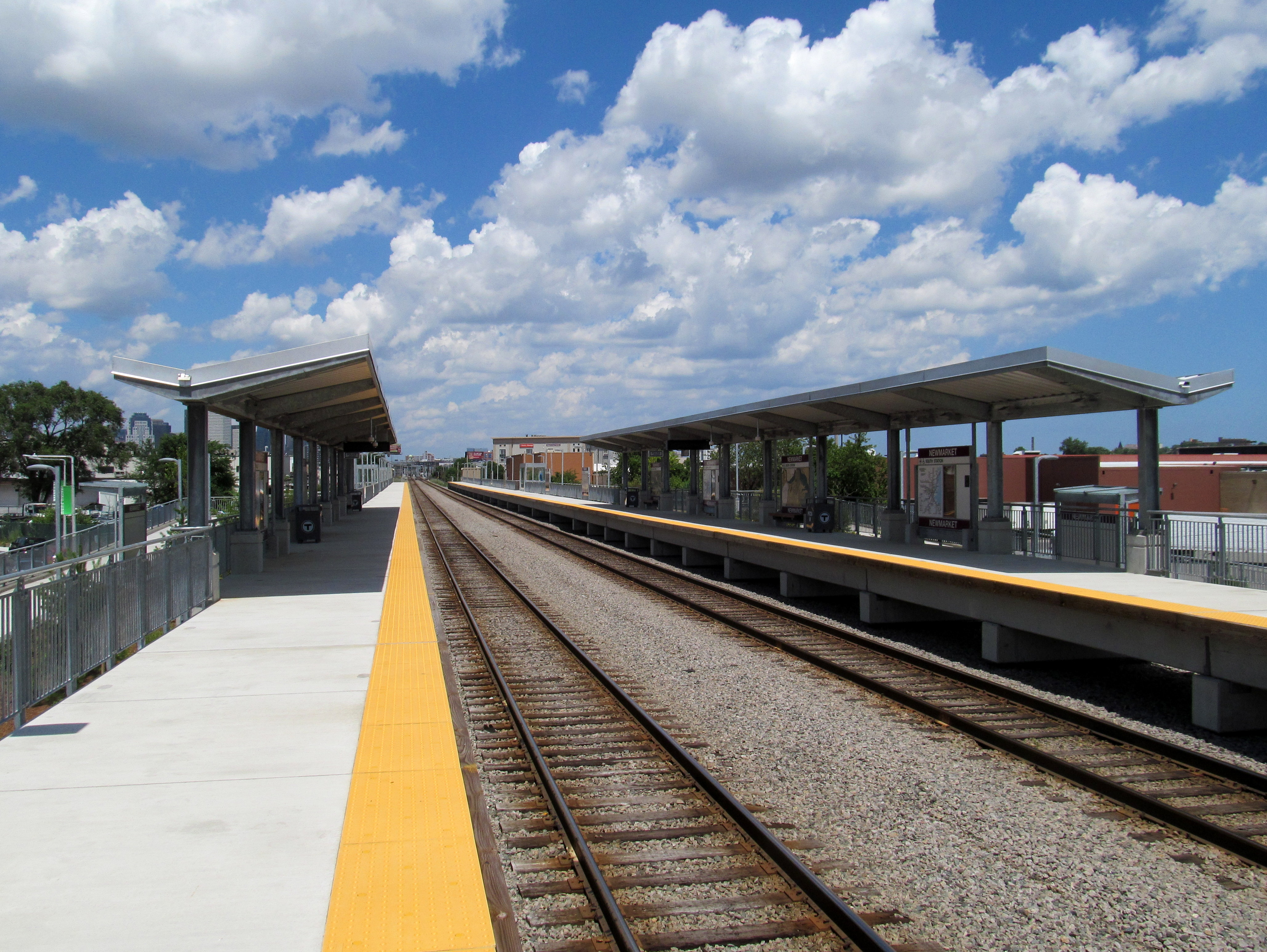
- Newmarket station in July 2013

General information
- Location: 1070 Massachusetts Avenue; Boston, Massachusetts
- Coordinates: 42.32811°N 71.06526°W
- Line: Dorchester Branch
- Platforms: 2 side platforms
- Tracks: 2
- Connections: MBTA bus: 8, 10

Construction
- Cycle facilities: 20 spaces
- Accessible: yes

Other information
- Fare zone: 1A

History
- Opened: July 1, 2013

Passengers
- 2024: 191 daily boardings

Services
Preceding station	MBTA	Following station
Uphams Corner toward Readville	Fairmount Line	South Station Terminus
Uphams Corner toward Forge Park/495 or Foxboro	Franklin/Foxboro Line	South Station Terminus
Location

Newmarket station is an MBTA Commuter Rail station in Boston, Massachusetts. It serves the Fairmount Line and a small number of Franklin/Foxboro Line trains. It is located off Massachusetts Avenue at Newmarket Square in the Dorchester neighborhood. The station has two 800-foot (240 m) high-level platforms and sloping walkways connecting it to Massachusetts Avenue. Originally planned to be in service in 2011, it opened on July 1, 2013, along with Four Corners/Geneva station.

== History ==
=== Previous service ===
Service on the Fairmount Line (as the Dorchester Branch of the Norfolk County Railroad and later the New York and New England Railroad and New York, New Haven and Hartford Railroad) began in 1855 and lasted until 1944. There were stations located in South Boston and Uphams Corner but not at Massachusetts Avenue. (The area between Massachusetts Avenue and Southampton Street was empty tidal flats until the early 20th century, when it was filled for use as a rail yard and industrial area.)

Temporary shuttle service resumed on the Fairmount Line in 1979 during Southwest Corridor construction, with stops at Uphams Corner, Morton Street, and Fairmount. The MBTA planned to drop the shuttle after service resumed on the Southwest Corridor in 1987, but the service was locally popular and the Fairmount Line became a permanent part of the system.

=== Planning ===
A plan called the Indigo Line was later advanced by community activists in which the line would add stations and more frequent service to closely resemble a conventional rapid transit line. The Indigo Line plan was not adopted, but elements of it were included when the Commonwealth of Massachusetts agreed in 2005 to make improvements on the Fairmount Line part of its legally binding commitment to mitigate increased air pollution from the Big Dig. Among the selected improvements in the Fairmount Line Improvements project were four new commuter rail stations on the line, including one at Massachusetts Avenue. The stations were originally to be completed by the end of 2011.

Newmarket was also a proposed stop on the Urban Ring – a circumferential bus rapid transit (BRT) line designed to connect the existing radial MBTA rail lines to reduce overcrowding in the downtown stations. Under draft plans released in 2008, Urban Ring buses would have run in dedicated lanes on Massachusetts Avenue, with stops at the railroad bridge. The project was cancelled in 2010.

=== Construction ===
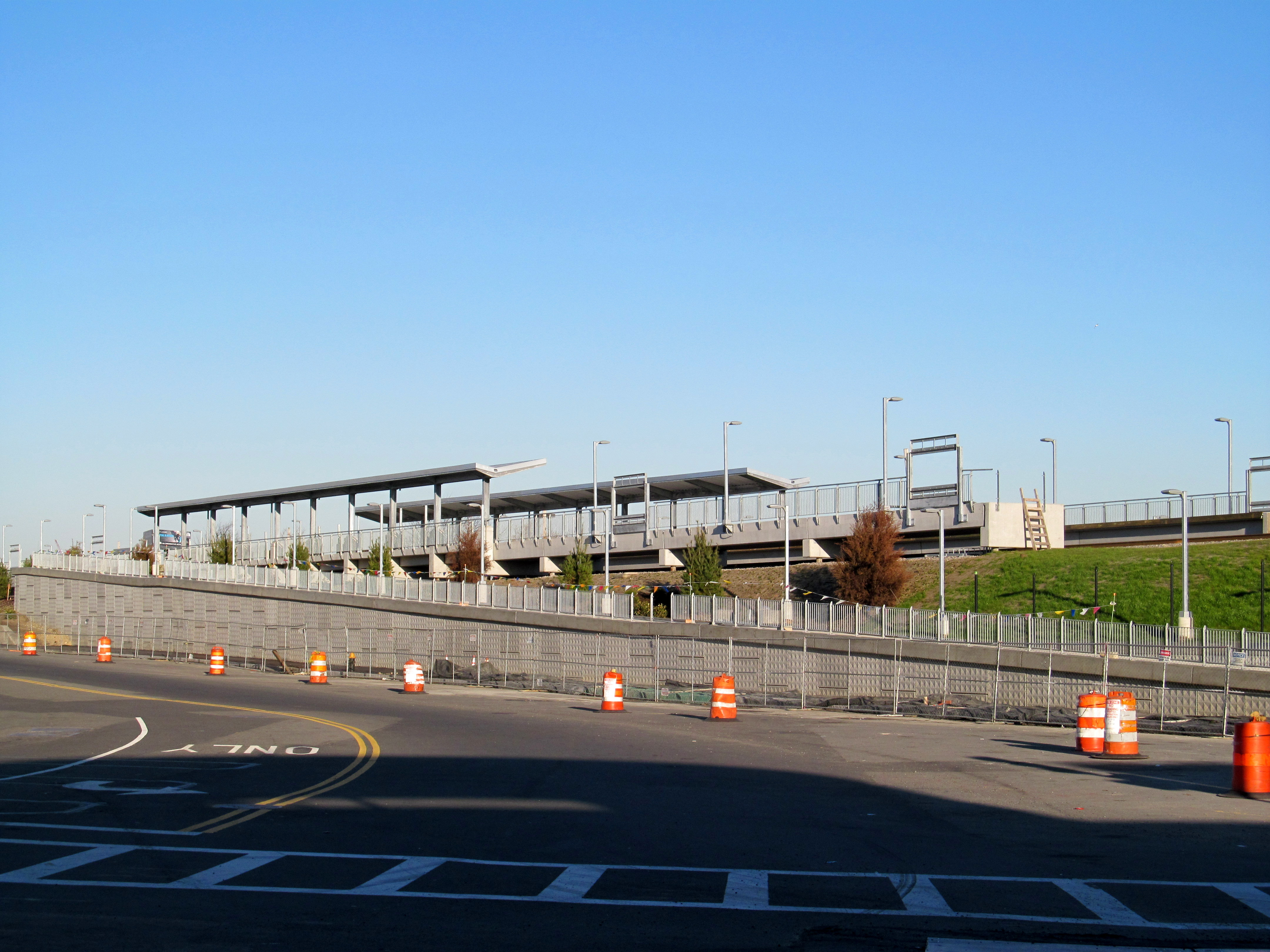
The outbound platform under construction in December 2012

After several years of planning, bidding for the $12.283 million station contract opened on August 18, 2010. Construction work began in January 2011. The station was then scheduled for completion in 2012, but was delayed due to the discovery of an electrical power bank — missing from NStar plans — connected to the adjacent shopping center.

By April 2012, the station was 49% complete; the platforms were in place but no ramps or canopies had been constructed. By September, canopies were in place and the ramps were under construction. After substantial work during the summer, the station was 70% complete by mid-September. Completion reached 85% by April 2013. Newmarket was substantially completed for its opening on July 1, 2013, with all construction to be finished by August 2013. Ribbon-cutting ceremonies were held at Newmarket, Four Corners/Geneva, and Talbot Avenue on July 17, 2013.

During service disruptions at South Station, Newmarket is used as the inbound terminus of the Fairmount Line, with bus connections to nearby Andrew station or directly to South Station.
