= De Ama Battle =

De Ama Battle, born Dolores Haynes, is a dance and movement instructor with a focus on Pan-Africanism and community healing. She is the founder of The Art of Black Dance and Music, Inc (abbreviated as ABDM) and aided in the development of the Cambridge Multicultural Arts Center. Since founding the company in 1975, Battle has worked to unify the Afro-descendant people in the Greater Boston Area and the African continent.

== Early life ==
Dolores Haynes (later known as De Ama Battle) was born in October 1938 to parents Madge Louis and James Theodore Haynes, in Cambridge, Massachusetts. Battle's mother worked as a technician at Raytheon while her father worked as a sneaker and tire manufacturer at BFGoodrich. She began going by the name De Ama later in life, and gained her surname “Battle” in 1960 after marrying Edward Battle.

In her early years, her family moved from Cambridge to Somerville, Massachusetts. At age four, Battle began studying ballet and jazz at the Ethel Covan School in Boston. In her late teens, Battle began to specialize in African dance practice and dance styles connected to the African-American experience.

== Career ==
With encouragement from her mother, began teaching dance at the age of fourteen. Battle has choreographed jazz and tap-dancing with the Covanettes Dance Company. Her students, a majority of whom were younger than her, went on to perform at John Hancock Hall in Boston, Massachusetts. Afterwards she went back to Cambridge to teach dance on a wider scale and pursued a further study of dance at the Elma Lewis School of Fine Arts.

In 1975, De Ama Battle founded the Art of Black Dance and Music in Somerville, Massachusetts. The dance company focused on arts education, and the study of Africa-rooted dance traditions, first with teenagers and then adults. Eventually, her vision expanded from just developing a sense of community to potentially minimizing youth violence.

Battle also taught dance at Tufts University, going on to aid the school in hosting the schools first Black dance concert in 1975. She went on to teach at Wellesley College and the Boston Conservatory at Berklee.

Mentored by Baba Chuck Davis, Battle's three different dance companies ---one teen group, one college group, and one adult performers group---traveled to The Gambia, Burkina Faso, Senegal, and Ghana to learn about West African dance cultures. Eventually, the ensemble traveled to Brazil to study Capoeira. In Rio de Janeiro, the group met the choreographer for the film Black Orpheus, Marlene Silva. Silva allowed the group to teach at her studio during their summer residency.

== Life & legacy ==
De Ama Battle’s papers were given to Harvard University’s Schlesinger Library in May and October 2010.

The collection includes materials some of which include ephemera like curricula, flyers, and program materials from dance instruction and performances as well as archival materials like videos of her dance classes, and field notes from her various research trips to Africa and the Caribbean between 1980 and the early 2000s (during which Battle documented African diasporic dance and culture).

== Honors & awards ==
In 2006, Battle received the Boston Dance Alliance Lifetime Achievement award.

In 2020, she was named as one of twenty exceptional artists and creative visionaries by The Cambridge Community Foundation. During the COVID-19 pandemic, the travel and performance of her dance companies was halted before being revitalized through the Boston Dance Alliance.^{[4]}

In 2023, she was recognized as one of "Boston’s most admired, beloved, and successful Black Women leaders" by the Black Women Lead project. Battle was honored with a banner on Blue Hill Ave in Boston as part of the Black Women Lead project which honors Black women who have shaped local histories or led Boston’s communities. De Ama Battle also appears in the book Black Women Lead: Boston's Most Admired, Beloved, and Iconic Leaders, 1700-Present.
