= Fairmount station (MBTA) =

Fairmount
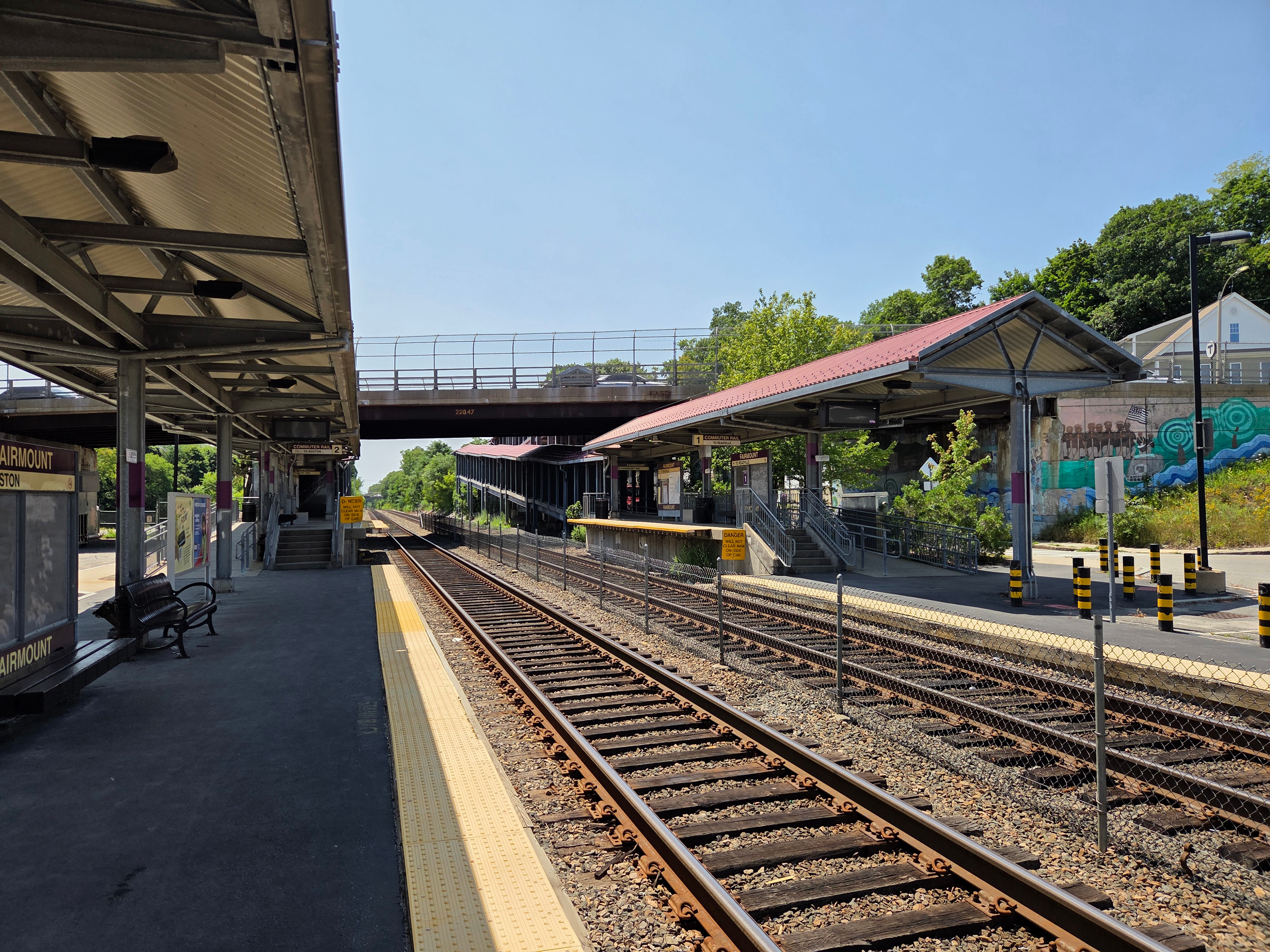
- Fairmount station in 2026

General information
- Location: Fairmount Avenue at Truman Highway; Hyde Park, Boston, Massachusetts
- Coordinates: 42.2538°N 71.1191°W
- Line: Midland Branch
- Platforms: 2 side platforms
- Tracks: 2
- Connections: MBTA bus: 24, 33

Construction
- Parking: 51 spaces
- Accessible: Yes

Other information
- Fare zone: 1A

History
- Opened: 1855; November 3, 1979
- Closed: 1944
- Rebuilt: 2003–2005
- Former names: Hyde Park

Passengers
- 2024: 528 daily boardings

Services
Preceding station	MBTA	Following station
Readville Terminus	Fairmount Line	Blue Hill Avenue toward South Station
Readville toward Forge Park/495 or Foxboro	Franklin/Foxboro Line	Blue Hill Avenue toward South Station
Route 128 toward Stoughton	Providence/Stoughton Line Limited service	Blue Hill Avenue One-way operation
Former services
Preceding station	MBTA	Following station
Route 128 toward Providence or Stoughton	Providence/Stoughton Line 1971-2004	Morton Street toward South Station
Preceding station	New York, New Haven and Hartford Railroad	Following station
Glenwood toward Readville	Boston–Readville via Midland Branch	River Street toward Boston
Location

Fairmount station is an MBTA Commuter Rail station in Boston, Massachusetts. It serves the Fairmount Line. It is located in the Hyde Park area, under the Fairmount Avenue overpass. Fairmount station opened in 1979 during Southwest Corridor reconstruction; intended to be temporary, it eventually became a permanent stop.

== History ==
=== Previous service ===
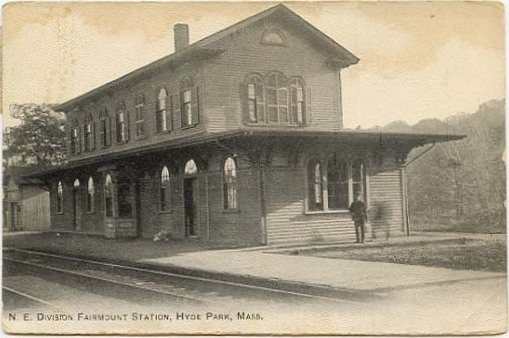
Early postcard of Fairmount station

Service on the Fairmount Line (as the Dorchester Branch of the Norfolk County Railroad and later the New York and New England Railroad and New York, New Haven and Hartford Railroad) began in 1855 and lasted until 1944. The service included a stop named Hyde Park at Fairmount Avenue, and a stop named Fairmount (also called Glenwood) near Glenwood Avenue. Another station, currently known as Hyde Park, is located in Hyde Park six blocks to the west. During their histories, both stations were referred to both as "Hyde Park" and as "Fairmount". The grade crossings at Fairmount Avenue, and at Dana Street (Bridge Street) nearby, were replaced with road bridges in 1909.

=== Fairmount Line ===
The Dorchester Branch (also known as the Midland Route) was reopened as a bypass in November 1979 during Southwest Corridor construction, including stops at Uphams Corner, Morton Street, and Fairmount. This station was originally built at minimal cost, with small low-level platforms and no direct access to Morton Street. The station was not handicapped accessible, as service over the route was intended to be temporary. However, it was popular with residents of the communities the line passed through: by 1983, over 600 riders per day boarded at Fairmount, enough to justify service to both Fairmount and nearby Hyde Park after the end of construction.

When the Southwest Corridor reopened in October 1987, the Fairmount shuttle service was retained as the Fairmount Line. Fairmount was the terminus of the line until it was extended to Readville on November 30, 1987.

=== Renovation ===
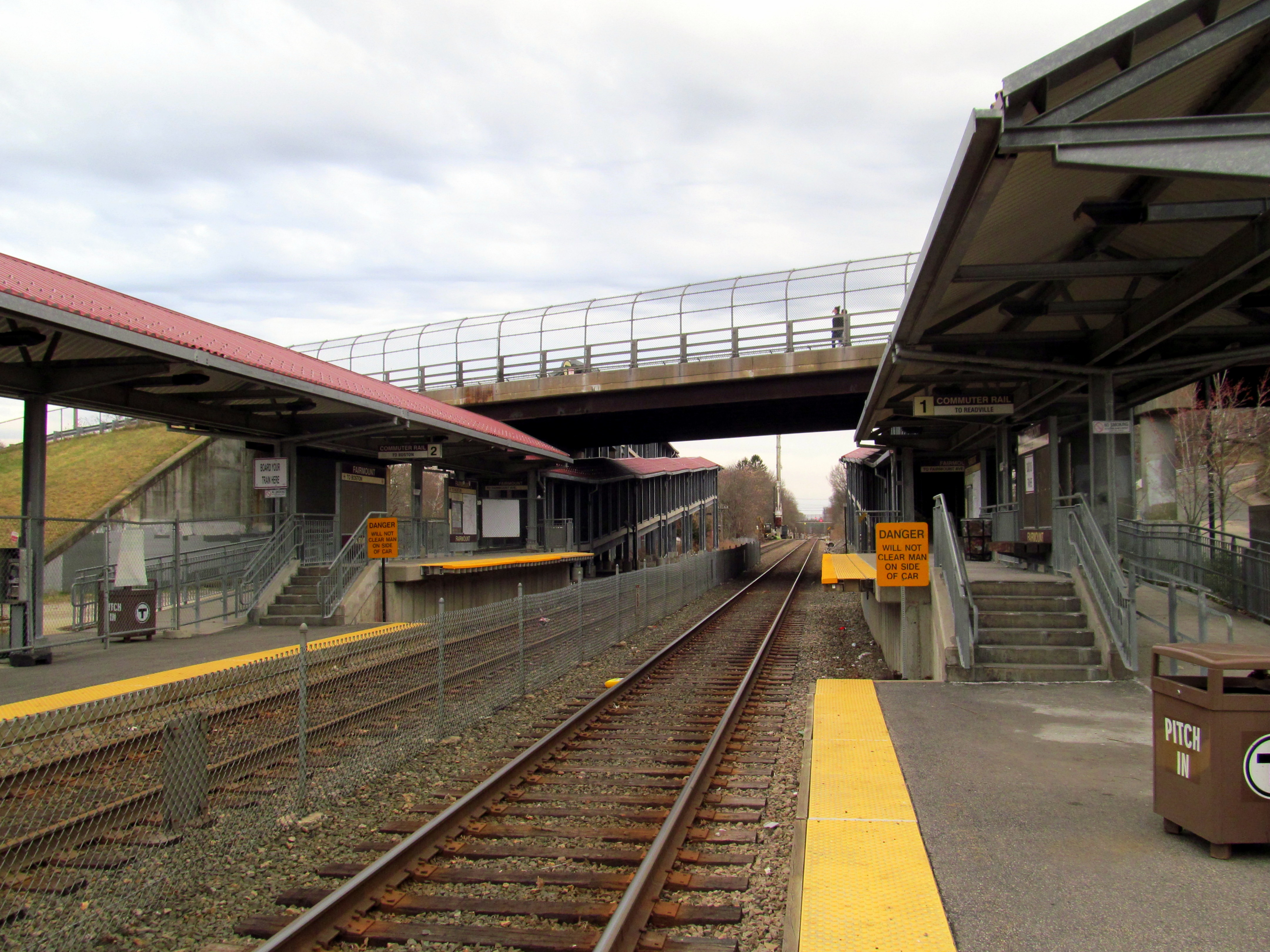
These ramps and mini-high platforms were added in the 2005 renovation

A major renovation of Fairmount station began in early 2003. The $7 million project, which was completed in 2004-05, added 1-car-length high platforms and ramps to the Fairmount Avenue overpass to make the station handicapped accessible. During the construction, new temporary platforms were built slightly northeast of the station.

Uphams Corner and Morton Street stations received full-length high level platforms in renovations that finished in 2007. When Blue Hill Avenue, the last of four new stations, was completed in 2017, Fairmount and Readville became the only stations on the line without full-length high-level platforms. The MBTA wishes to eventually add high-level platforms at Fairmount to speed boarding, but there are no current plans to do so.

As part of a long-term shift of the Fairmount Line from commuter rail to a rapid transit-like service, Fairmount was shifted from Zone 1 to Zone 1A on July 1, 2013, making a trip to South Station equal to a rapid transit fare. This equalized all fares on the line except trips to/from Readville. On May 20, 2024, Fairmount became the outer terminal for some midday Fairmount Line service.
