= Morton Street station =

Railway station in Boston, Massachusetts, US

Morton Street
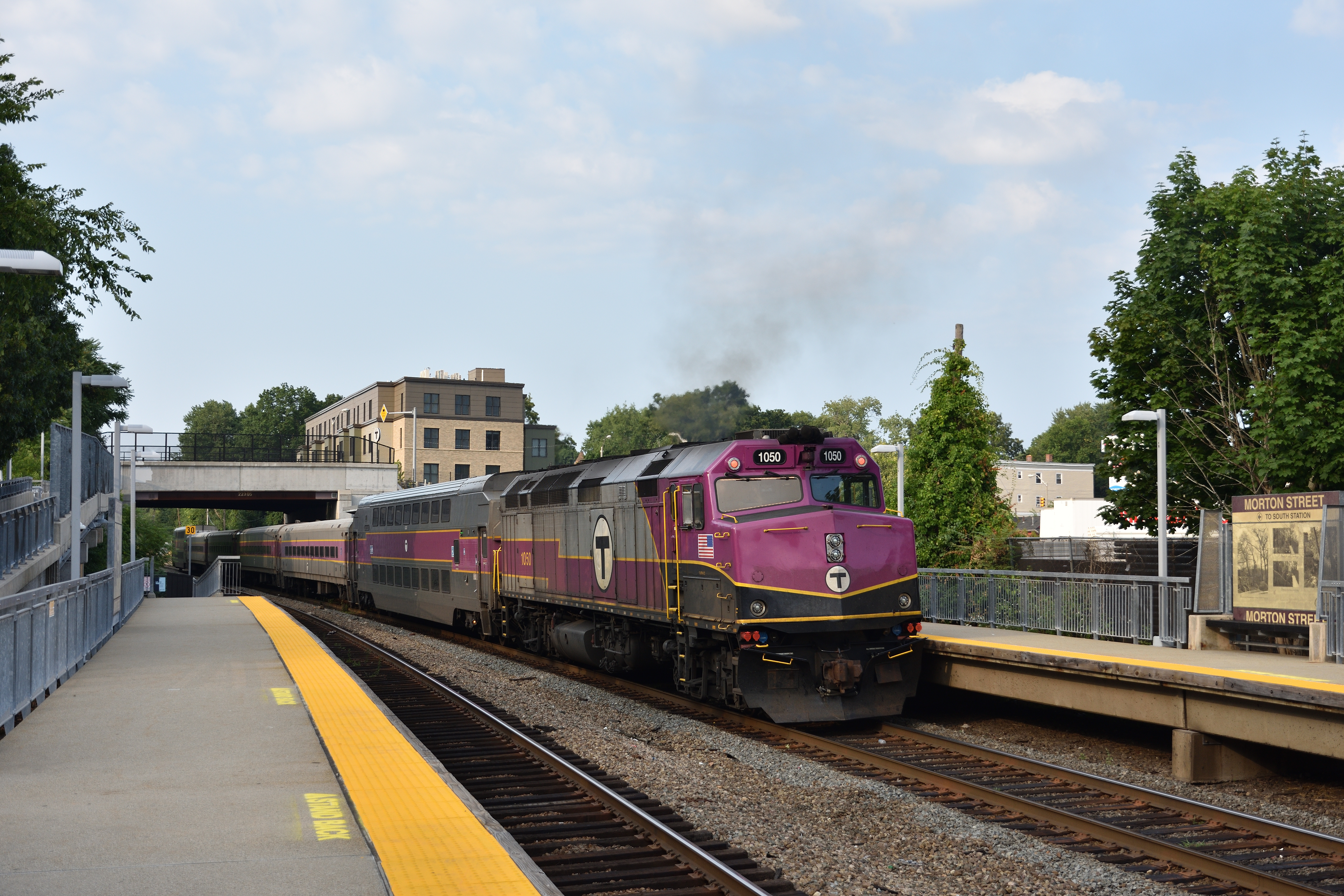
- An inbound train at Morton Street station in 2024

General information
- Location: 865 Morton Street; Mattapan, Boston, Massachusetts
- Coordinates: 42.28012°N 71.08622°W
- Line: Dorchester Branch
- Platforms: 2 side platforms
- Tracks: 2
- Connections: MBTA bus: 21, 26

Construction
- Accessible: Yes

Other information
- Fare zone: 1A

History
- Opened: 1855; November 3, 1979; October 5, 1987
- Closed: 1944, January 30, 1981
- Rebuilt: 2006
- Former names: Forest Avenue (previous station)

Passengers
- 2024: 427 daily boardings

Services
Preceding station	MBTA	Following station
Blue Hill Avenue toward Readville	Fairmount Line	Talbot Avenue toward South Station
Blue Hill Avenue toward Forge Park/495 or Foxboro	Franklin/Foxboro Line	Talbot Avenue toward South Station
Former services
Preceding station	MBTA	Following station
Fairmount toward Providence or Stoughton	Providence/Stoughton Line 1971-2004	Uphams Corner toward South Station
Preceding station	New York, New Haven and Hartford Railroad	Following station
Mattapan toward Readville	Boston–Readville via Midland Branch	Dorchester toward Boston
Location

Morton Street station is an MBTA Commuter Rail station on Fairmount Line located on Morton Street (MA 203) in the Mattapan neighborhood of Boston. With two full-length high-level platforms and ramps to the street, the station is accessible. The station was reconstructed in 2006, with the official reopening in 2007.

== History ==
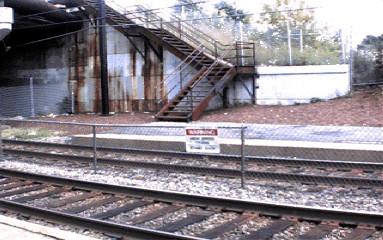

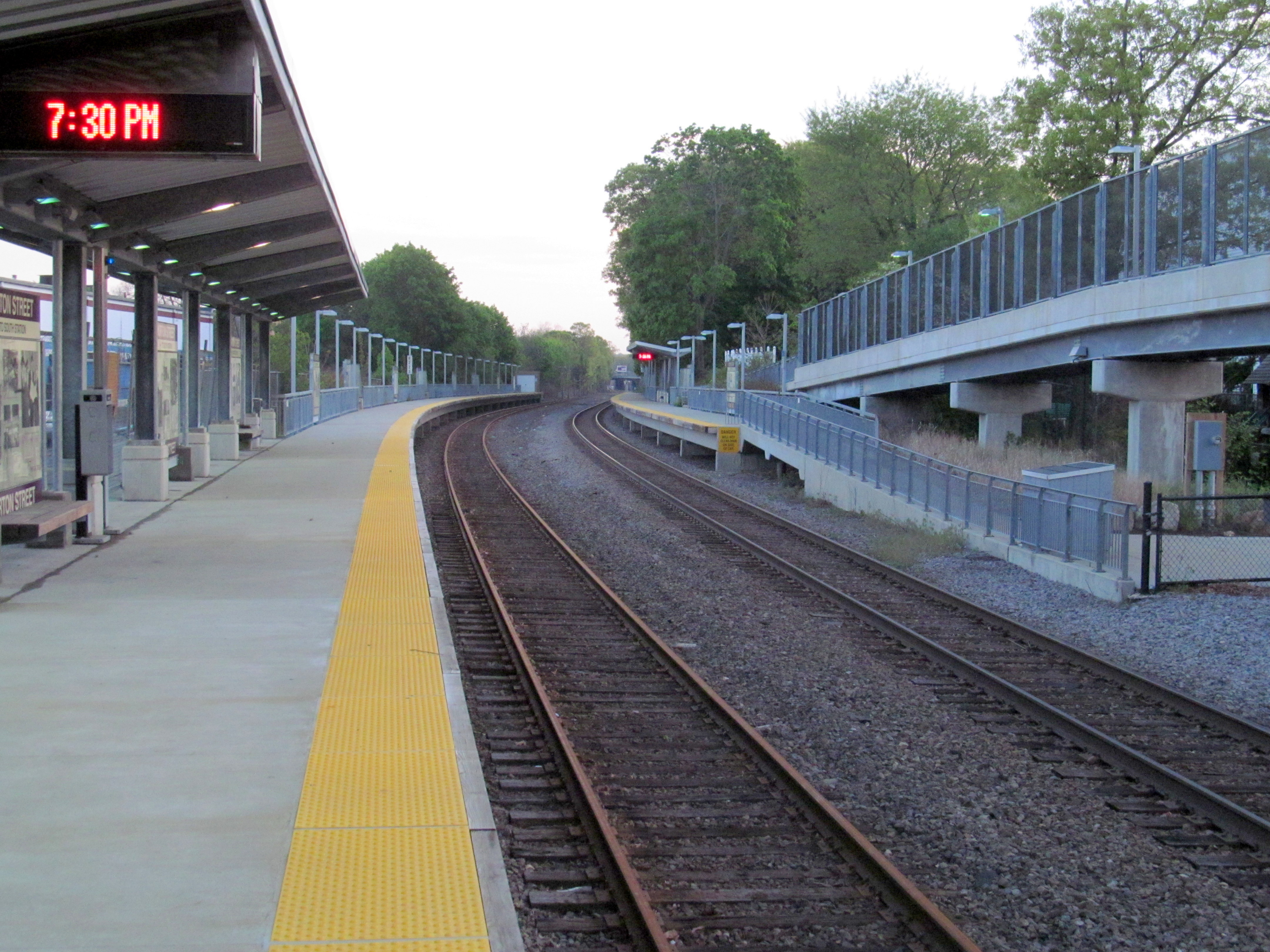
Morton Street before and after the 2006 reconstruction

Service on the Fairmount Line (as the Dorchester Branch of the Norfolk County Railroad and later the New York and New England Railroad and New York, New Haven and Hartford Railroad) began in 1855 and lasted until 1944. The service included a stop at Morton Street, originally known as Forest Avenue.

The Dorchester Branch (Midland Route) was reopened as a bypass in November 1979 during Southwest Corridor construction, including stops at Uphams Corner, Morton Street, and Fairmount. Uphams Corner and Morton Street were dropped effective January 30, 1981 as part of systemwide cuts. Morton Street was originally built at minimal cost, with small low-level platforms and staircases to Morton Street. The station was not accessible, since service over the route was intended to be temporary; however, it was popular with residents of the communities the line passed through. When the Southwest Corridor reopened on October 5, 1987, the Fairmount Line shuttle service was retained, with Uphams Corner and Morton Street renovated and reopened.

In September 2005, the MBTA awarded a $6.5 million contract to rebuild the station as part of the Fairmount Line Improvements project. The upgrades included two full-length high-level platforms to make the station accessible, ramps to Morton Street and Flint Street, canopies, and improved lighting and signage. The work was completed on July 17, 2007. In 2014, MassDOT replaced the structurally deficient bridge carrying Morton Street over the Fairmount Line tracks. Alternate accessible entrances to the station from the street were used during the replacement.
