= Uphams Corner station =

Uphams Corner
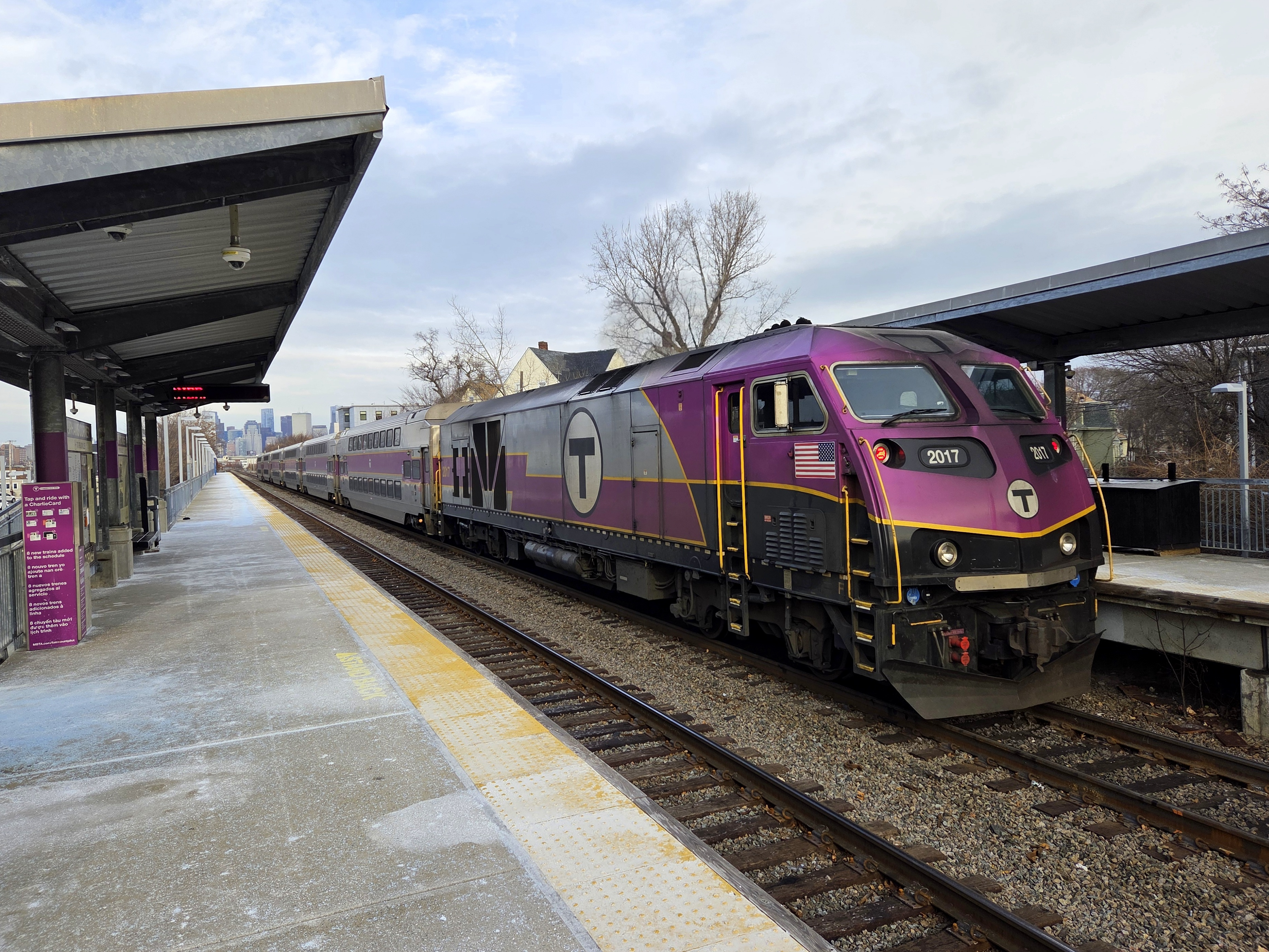
- An inbound train at Uphams Corner station in 2025

General information
- Location: 691 Dudley Street; Dorchester, Boston, Massachusetts
- Coordinates: 42.3191°N 71.0686°W
- Line: Dorchester Branch
- Platforms: 2 side platforms
- Tracks: 2
- Connections: MBTA bus: 15, 41

Construction
- Accessible: Yes

Other information
- Fare zone: 1A

History
- Opened: 1855; November 3, 1979; October 5, 1987
- Closed: 1944; January 30, 1981
- Rebuilt: January 23, 2007
- Former names: Stoughton Street (until 1880s); Dudley Street (1880s–June 15, 1924)

Passengers
- 2024: 364 daily boardings

Services
Preceding station	MBTA	Following station
Four Corners/Geneva toward Readville	Fairmount Line	Newmarket toward South Station
Four Corners/Geneva toward Forge Park/495 or Foxboro	Franklin/Foxboro Line	Newmarket toward South Station
Former services
Preceding station	MBTA	Following station
Morton Street toward Providence or Stoughton	Providence/Stoughton Line 1971-2004	South Station Terminus
Preceding station	New York, New Haven and Hartford Railroad	Following station
Bird Street toward Readville	Boston–Readville via Midland Branch	Boston Terminus
Location

Uphams Corner station is an MBTA Commuter Rail station in Boston, Massachusetts. It serves the Fairmount Line. It is located on Dudley Street in the Uphams Corner area of the Dorchester neighborhood. It was reopened in 1979 after the line had been closed for 35 years. The station is fully accessible with two full-length high-level platforms and ramps to the street, which were added during a construction project that finished in 2007.

== History ==
=== Original station ===
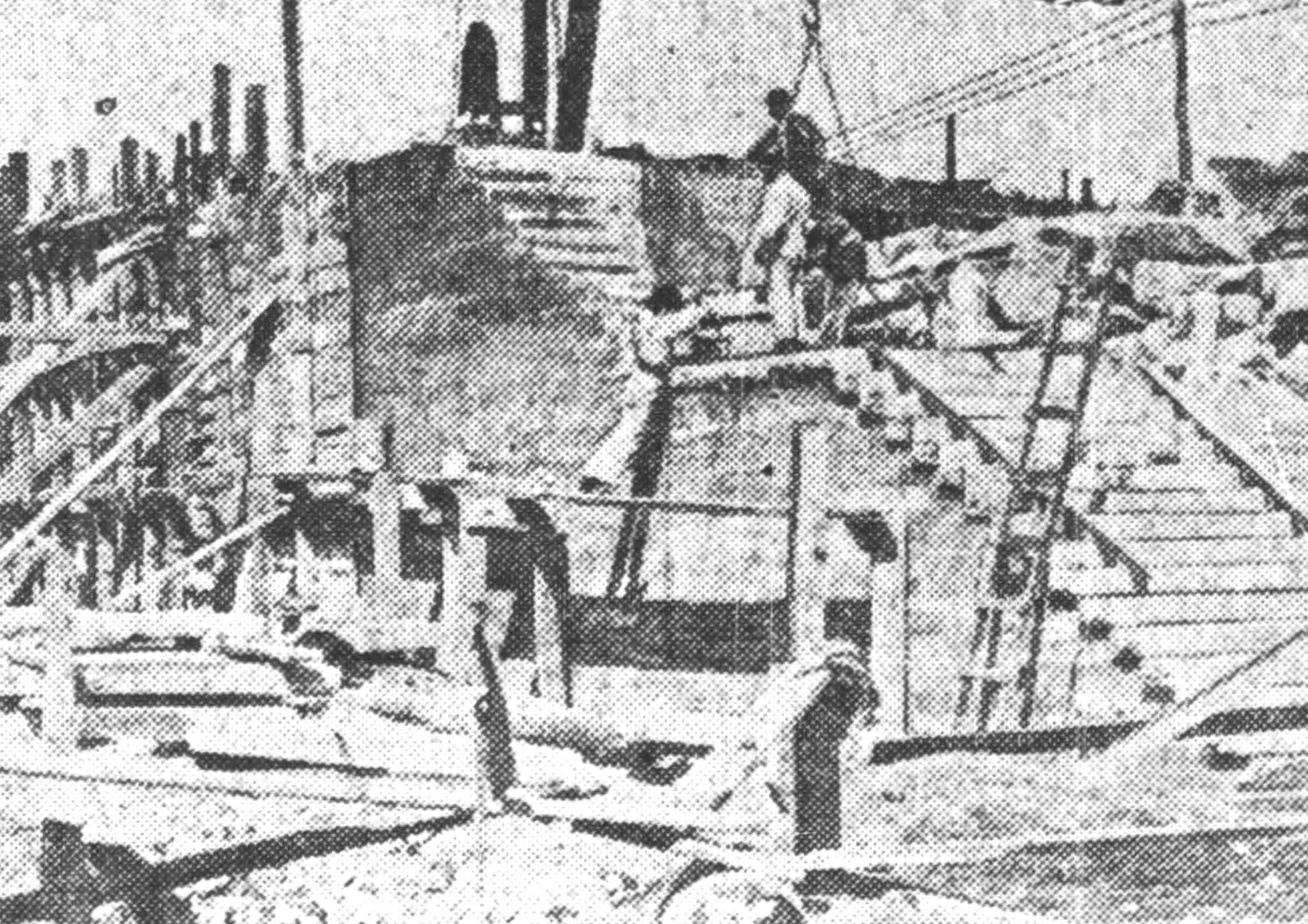
Construction of the new station in 1907

Service on the Fairmount Line (as the Dorchester Branch of the Norfolk County Railroad and later the New York and New England Railroad and New York, New Haven and Hartford Railroad) began in 1855, although it was frequently out of service until 1867. The service included a stop at Stoughton Street near Uphams Corner; a Cottage Street station may have also been briefly located a block to the north. The station was renamed Dudley Street after the street was renamed between Brook Avenue (the Roxbury/Dorchester border) and Uphams Corner in 1874.

Elimination of the busy Dudley Street grade crossing was long desired, but proved difficult because changing the grade of Dudley Street required modifying several nearby cross streets and numerous buildings. Construction to raise the tracks and lower Dudley Street began around September 1906. A temporary streetcar bypass track, railroad trestle, and station opened in January 1907. The railroad initially intended to continue using the 54-year-old wooden station building, which was insufficient to handle the 2,700 daily passengers at the station. After a May 1907 hearing, the railroad agreed to build a new stone station.

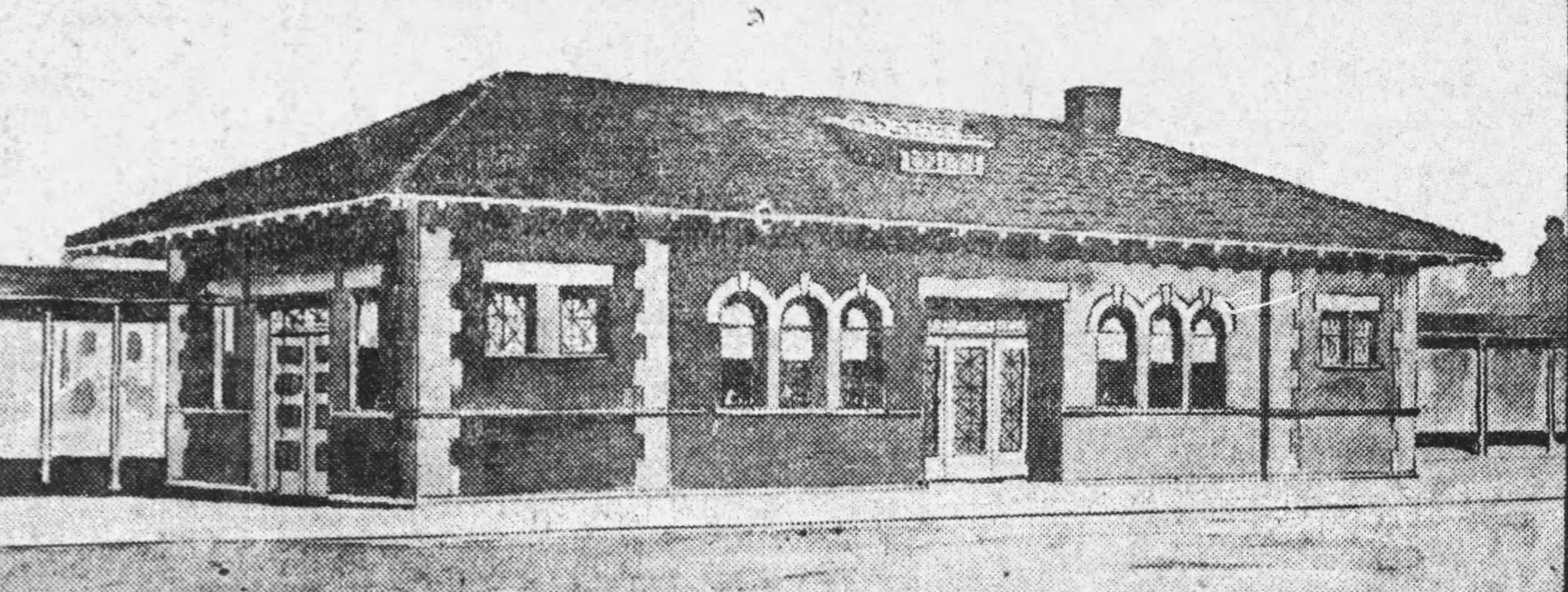
The 1909-built Dudley Street station

The grade crossing elimination was completed in 1908. It cost $500,000 (equivalent to $12,300,000 in 2024) and modified the grade of the tracks for nearly a mile from Massachusetts Avenue to Bird Street. The new stone station opened on April 14, 1909, at a cost of $18,000 (equivalent to $441,000 in 2024), then serving 65 trains per day. Located on the east side of the tracks, it was 72 by 27 feet (21.9 m × 8.2 m) in size with a 45-by-25-foot (13.7 m × 7.6 m) waiting room, a ticket and telegraph office, and a baggage room. It was made of red brick with a concrete foundation, brownstone base, and limestone trim. A pedestrian tunnel under the tracks connected the platforms.

On June 15, 1924, the station was again renamed as Uphams Corner to avoid confusion with Dudley Street Terminal. Undercut by streetcars, buses, and the Elevated for decades, service on the line ended in 1944.

=== MBTA station ===
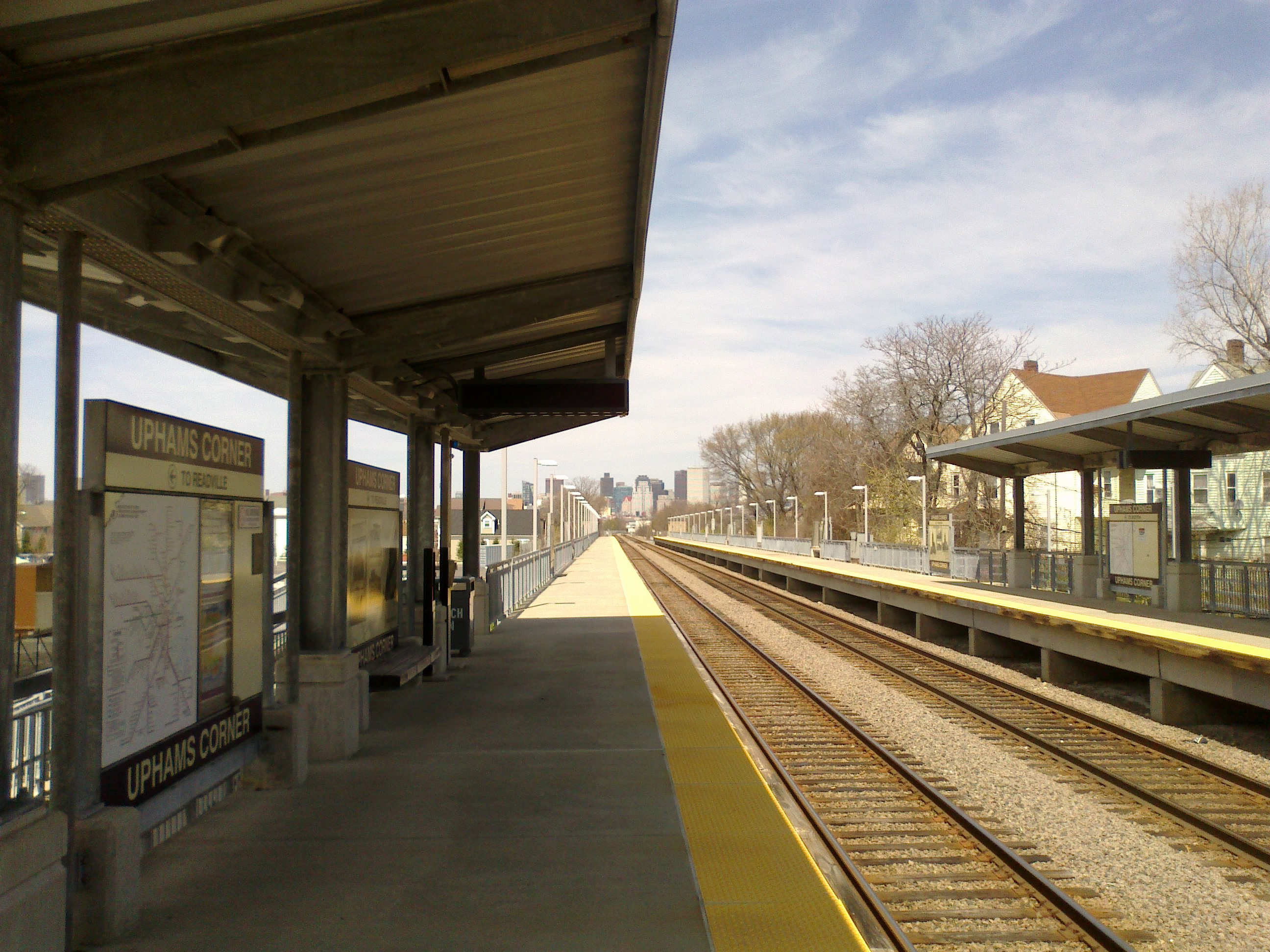
The station's full-length accessible high-level platforms were added in the 2006 reconstruction

The Dorchester Branch (also known as the Midland Route) was reopened as a bypass on November 3, 1979, during Southwest Corridor construction, including stops at Uphams Corner, Morton Street, and Fairmount. Uphams Corner was originally built at minimal cost, with small low-level platforms and staircases to Dudley Street. Intended to be only in service for several years, the station was not handicapped accessible.

Uphams Corner and Morton Street were dropped effective January 30, 1981 as part of systemwide cuts. Service over the route was intended to be temporary; however, it was popular with residents of the communities the line passed through. When the Southwest Corridor reopened on October 5, 1987, the Fairmount shuttle service was retained, with Uphams Corner and Morton Street renovated and reopened.

The station was rebuilt in 2005–2007 as part of the larger Fairmount Line Improvements project, which also included four new stations along the line. A groundbreaking was held on April 14, 2005. The rebuilding included new full-length high-level platforms, ramps to Dudley Street, canopies, and new lighting and signage. The fully accessible station was officially reopened on January 23, 2007.

In the mid-2010s, Uphams Corner station became locally known for high rates of heroin use at the lightly used and largely unpatrolled station.
