= Forge Park/495 station =

Rail station in Franklin, Massachusetts, US

Forge Park/495
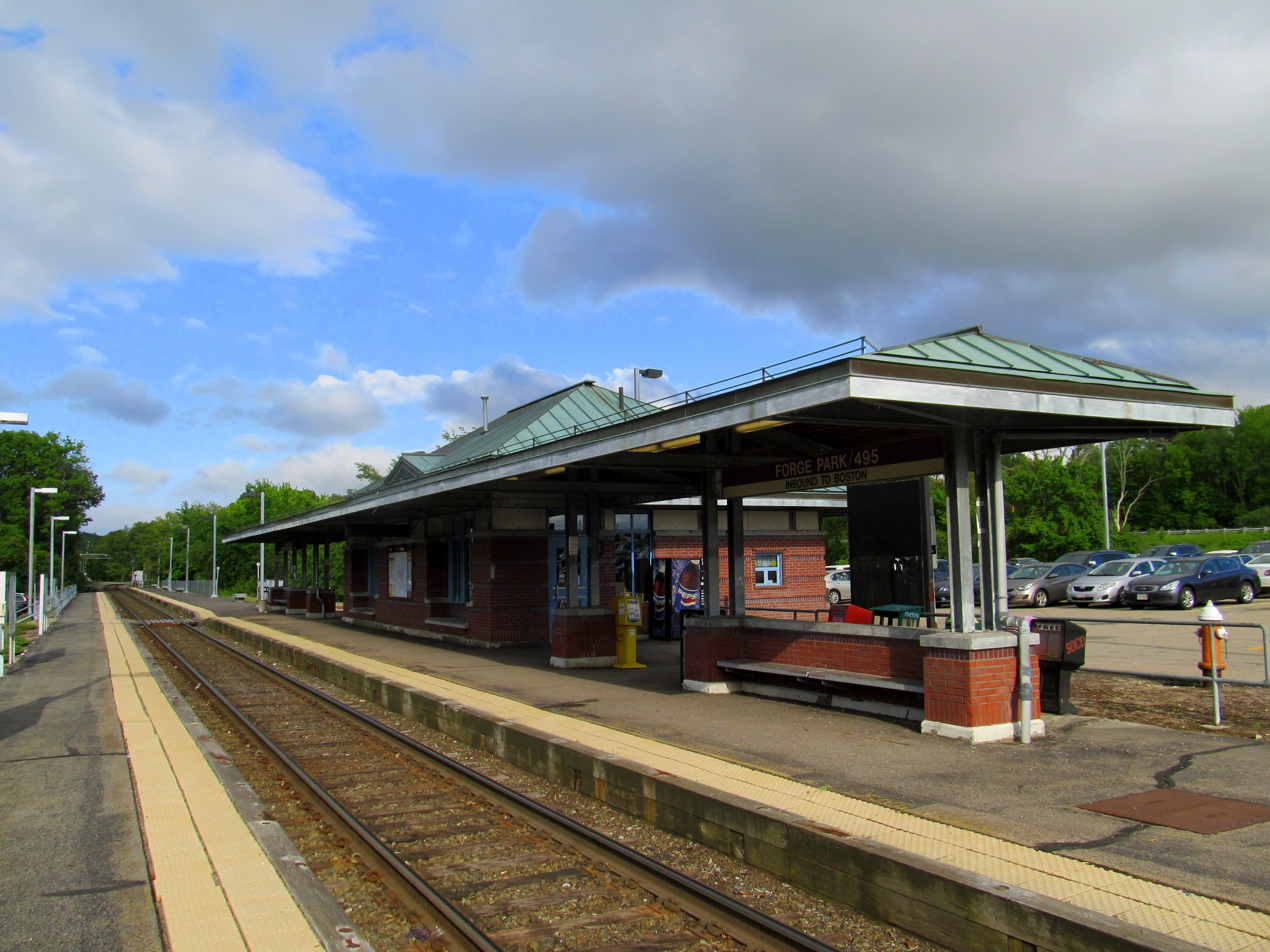
- Forge Park/495 station in May 2017

General information
- Location: 1000 West Central Street; Franklin, Massachusetts
- Coordinates: 42.0899°N 71.4390°W
- Line: Milford Secondary
- Platforms: 2 side platforms
- Tracks: 1
- Connections: MWRTA: 495 Connector

Construction
- Parking: 718 spaces ($4.00 fee)
- Cycle facilities: 14 spaces
- Accessible: Yes

Other information
- Fare zone: 6

History
- Opened: June 2, 1988

Passengers
- 2024: 485 daily boardings

Services
Preceding station	MBTA	Following station
Terminus	Franklin/Foxboro Line	Franklin toward South Station
Location

Forge Park/495 station is a Massachusetts Bay Transportation Authority (MBTA) commuter rail station served by the Franklin/Foxboro Line. It is located off Route 140 near Interstate 495 in Franklin, Massachusetts, United States. A park and ride station serving southwestern Boston suburbs and northeastern Rhode Island, it is the outer terminus of the Franklin/Foxboro Line. The station has two side platforms serving a single track, with an accessible mini-high platform and a station building on the south platform.

The Milford, Franklin and Providence Railroad opened in 1883, with a station built at Unionville soon after. The line was soon acquired by the Milford and Woonsocket Railroad, which became part of the New York and New England Railroad in 1887 and the New York, New Haven and Hartford Railroad in 1898. Service on the line, by then down to a single daily mixed train, ended in 1920. It resumed in 1926 (likely without Unionville station) and lasted until 1938, with a brief revival in 1940.

In 1986, the MBTA agreed to build a new MBTA Commuter Rail station, near the former Unionville site, to serve an industrial park in Franklin. Forge Park/495 station, named for the industrial park and Interstate 495, opened on June 2, 1988. A second parking lot, the mini-high platform, and the station building were added in 1989.

== Station design ==
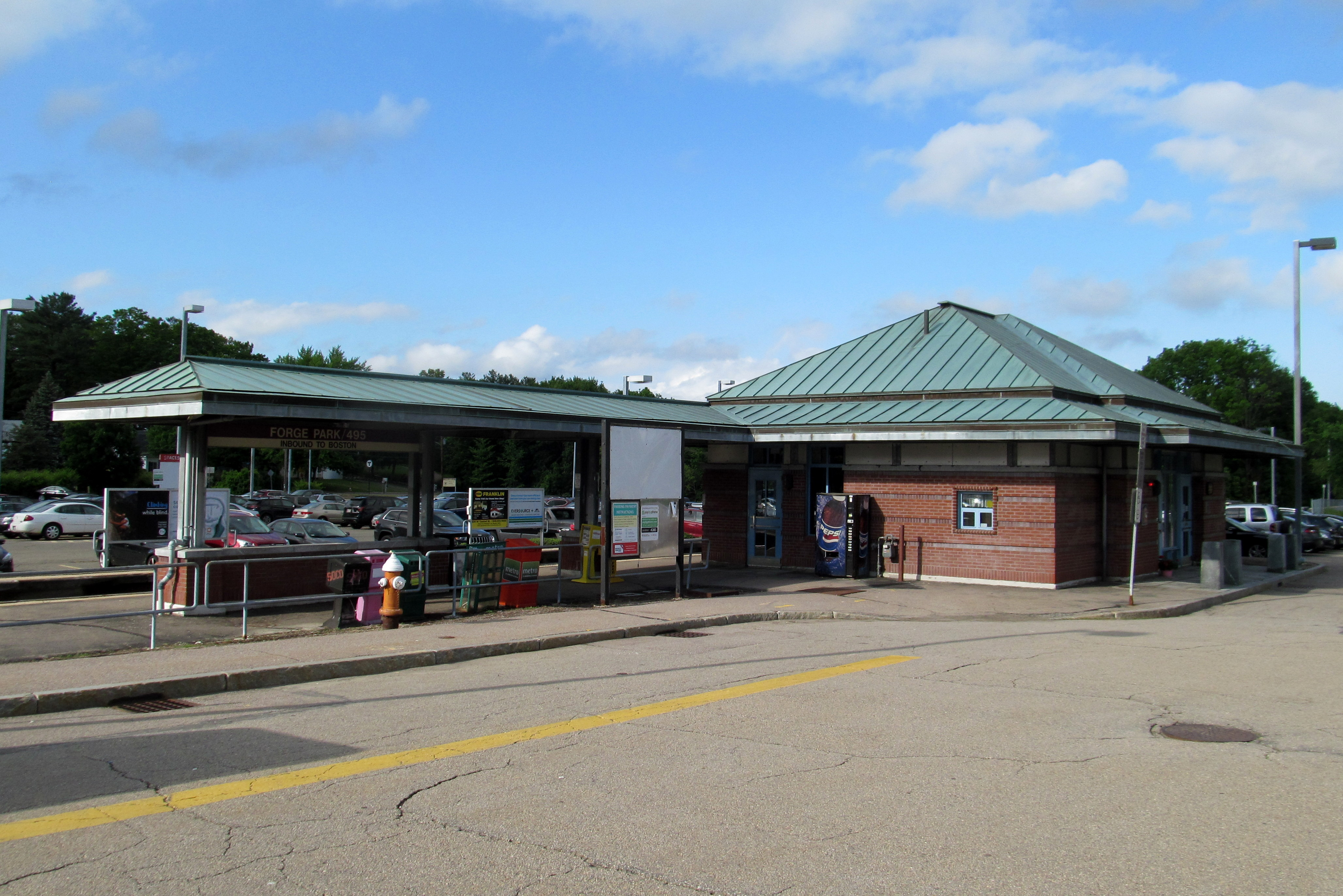
The station building and canopy

Franklin/Forge Park station is located off Massachusetts Route 140 in the Forge Park industrial park, about 2 miles (3.2 km) west of downtown Franklin, Massachusetts. Its name also reflects nearby Interstate 495, which has an interchange with Route 140 about 1/2 mile (0.80 km) to the east. The station has two side platforms serving a single track — a layout unique on the MBTA system – to provide access from parking lots on both sides of the track. A mini-high platform on the south platform makes the station accessible.

A brick station building with a canopy is located on the south side of the track. Forge Park/495 serves as a park and ride station for the Blackstone Valley area, including portions of northeast Rhode Island, with around 700 parking spaces in the two lots.

== History ==
=== Former service ===
The Milford, Franklin and Providence Railroad, under control of the Providence and Worcester Railroad (P&W), was charted in 1882. It opened in August 1883, connecting Bellingham Junction (where the Milford and Woonsocket Railroad met the Charles River Branch Railroad) to Franklin Junction on the New York and New England Railroad (NY&NE). Unionville station was built soon afterwards at Central Street in the Unionville village in Franklin, near where the modern station is located. The small station building was located on the north side of the tracks.

The newly independent Milford and Woonsocket obtained control of the Milford, Franklin and Providence Railroad in 1884. The Milford and Woonsocket was leased by the NY&NE in September 1887. The NY&NE entered bankruptcy in 1893; its 1895 successor New England Railroad was leased by the New York, New Haven and Hartford Railroad in 1898 as its Midland Division. Service between Milford and Franklin was reduced to a mixed train and ended in 1920.

Service between Bellingham Junction and Franklin resumed on June 13, 1926, as some Charles River Branch trains were rerouted to Franklin. Unionville station was no longer served by the time the 88 stations case ended that service on July 18, 1938, nor was it served when the service was briefly revived from March to May 1940. The line continued in use by freight, eventually becoming the CSX Milford Secondary. The Massachusetts Bay Transportation Authority (MBTA) was created in 1964 to subsidize suburban commuter rail service; the Midland Division was cut back to Franklin station in 1966 and became the Franklin Line. The former Unionville station building is no longer extant.

=== Forge Park/495 ===
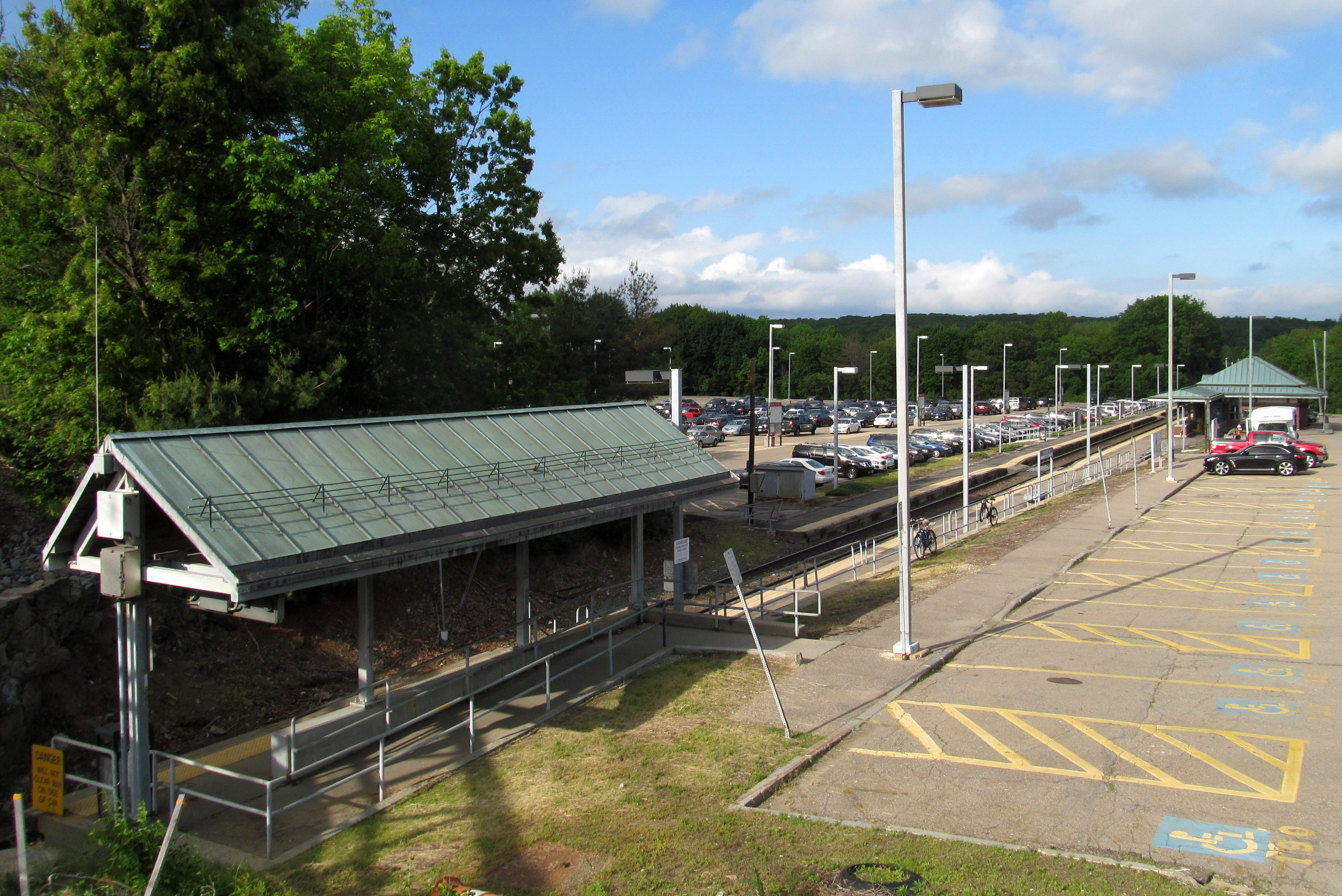
The 1989-added accessible mini-high platform

In September 1985, the National Development investment firm purchased 382 acres (155 ha) of land to build an industrial park called Forge Park near I-495 in Franklin – one of many such developments on the state's circumferential highways that decade. By March 1986, the MBTA had agreed to build a new station with a 1,000-car garage on the Milford Secondary to serve the development, and the state had committed $8 million (equivalent to $19 million in 2024) for the project. The developer donated 8 acres (3.2 ha) of land to build parking lots for the station. It was intended to serve as a park and ride location to reduce crowding at other lots elsewhere in the MBTA system. The MBTA leased the Milford Secondary from Conrail for the extension, with the possibility of future purchase.

The station opened on June 2, 1988, as a 2.8-mile (4.5 km) extension of the Franklin Line. Built at a total cost of $10 million (equivalent to $23 million in 2024), it had a 381-space surface parking lot rather than the originally planned garage. Later that month, the MBTA board approved construction of an additional 365-space parking lot at a cost of $2.3 million (equivalent to $5.2 million in 2024). The station was not accessible upon opening; the mini-high platform was added in 1989 along with the additional parking and the brick station building.

The MBTA initially leased the ticket booth and concession stand to the town for $1 annually; Franklin Youth Services operated the franchise and retained the profits to support its programs. Another new station on the Franklin Line, Dedham Corporate Center, was constructed by National Development to support a different development; it was opened in January 1990. A further extension of the Franklin Line from Forge Park/495 to Milford was approved by the MBTA board in March 1989. This extension was studied in 1997 and 2011, and a potential extension to Woonsocket, Rhode Island, via the Milford Secondary and Charles River Branch was studied in 2007, but Forge Park/495 has remained the terminal.
