= Norwood Central station =

Rail station in Norwood, Massachusetts, US

Norwood Central
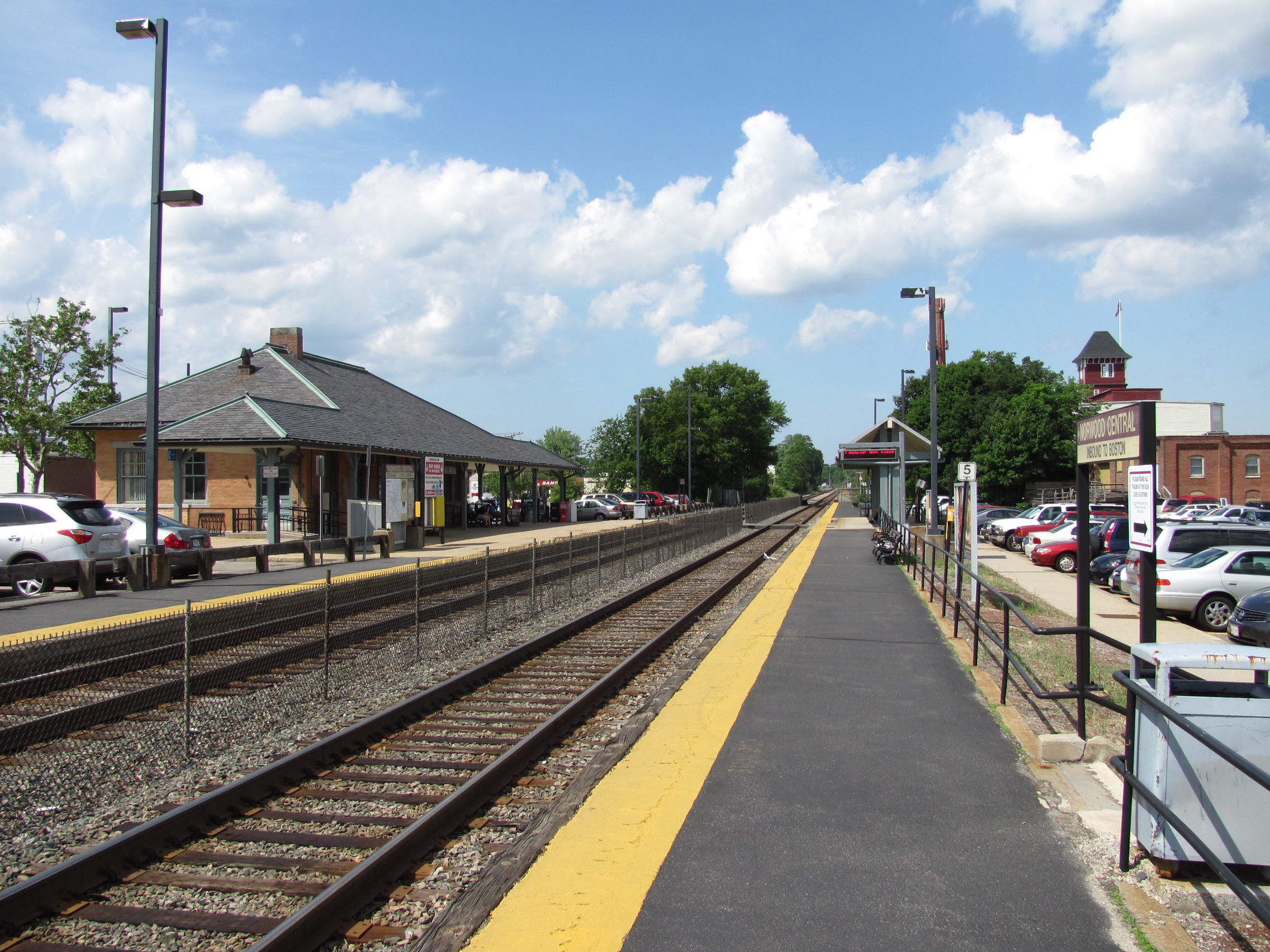
- Norwood Central station in June 2010

General information
- Location: 164 Broadway; Norwood, Massachusetts
- Coordinates: 42.18875°N 71.19990°W
- Line: Franklin Branch
- Platforms: 2 side platforms
- Tracks: 2

Construction
- Parking: 781 spaces ($4.00 fee)
- Cycle facilities: 27 spaces
- Accessible: yes

Other information
- Fare zone: 3

History
- Opened: c. 1852
- Rebuilt: 1899, c. 1990
- Former names: Dedham Middle, Everett's

Passengers
- 2024: 624 daily boardings

Services
| Preceding station | MBTA | Following station |
|---|---|---|
| Windsor Gardens toward Forge Park/495 or Foxboro | Franklin/Foxboro Line | Norwood Depot toward South Station |
Former services
| Preceding station | MBTA | Following station |
|---|---|---|
| Foxboro Terminus | Foxboro event service | Dedham Corporate Center (1995–2010) toward South Station |
| Foxboro Terminus | Foxboro event service | Readville (1986–1988) toward South Station |
| Preceding station | New York, New Haven and Hartford Railroad | Following station |
| Plimptonville toward Blackstone | Midland Line | Norwood toward Boston |
| Morrills toward Providence | Wrentham Branch | Norwood toward Boston |
Location

Norwood Central station is an MBTA Commuter Rail Franklin/Foxboro Line station located near downtown Norwood, Massachusetts. The station has two side platforms serving the two tracks of the Franklin Branch, each with a mini-high section for accessibility. It serves as a park-and-ride location for Boston's southwest suburbs; with 1,041 daily riders it is the busiest station on the line outside Boston. The former station building, a one-story yellow brick structure, has been converted to commercial use.

The Norfolk County Railroad opened through South Dedham (now Norwood) in 1849. Dedham Middle station opened around 1852, and a small station building was constructed in 1865. The station was renamed Everett's by 1856 and Norwood Central in the 1870s. In 1875, the line became part of the New York and New England Railroad (NY&NE), which built its main shops adjacent to Norwood Central. The Old Colony Railroad opened its Wrentham Branch to Norwood in 1892. The New York, New Haven and Hartford Railroad leased the Old Colony in 1893 and obtained control of the NY&NE in 1895.

The New Haven eliminated an adjacent grade crossing in 1896 and built a new station structure in 1899, ending a decade-long controversy. As rail travel declined, Norwood Shops closed around 1930 and Wrentham Branch service ended in 1938. The Massachusetts Bay Transportation Authority (MBTA) began subsidizing service in 1966 and purchased the line in 1973. Under the MBTA, renovations to the station were made around 1977 and 1990. Along with Franklin Line commuter rail service, Norwood Central was a stop for Foxboro Stadium special events trains from 1986 to 1988 and 1995 to 2010.

== Station design ==
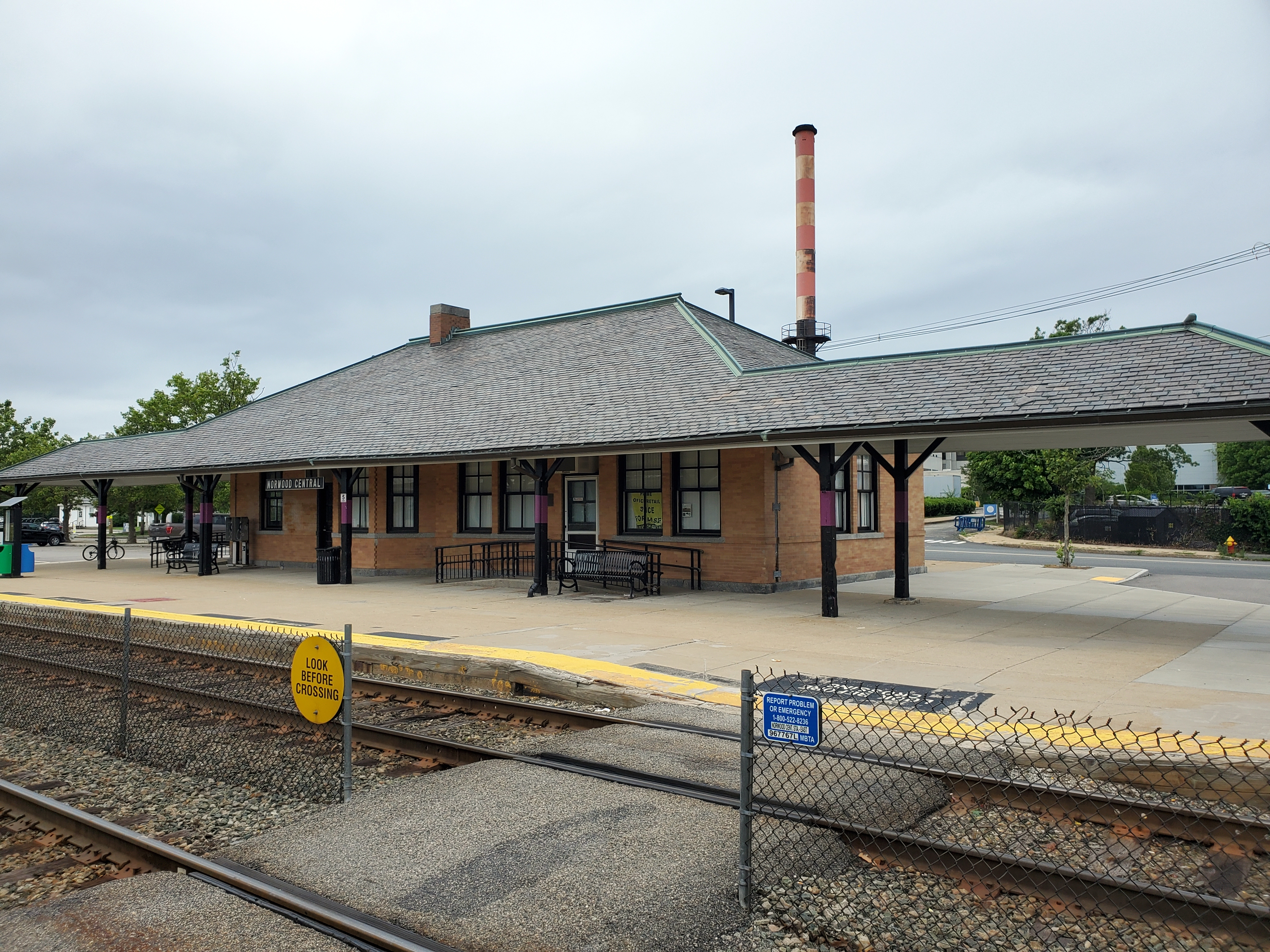
The former station building in 2021

Norwood Central station is located near downtown Norwood, about 0.4 miles (0.6 km) south of Norwood Common. The two-track Franklin Branch, used by the Franklin/Foxboro Line service, runs approximately north–south through Norwood. Just south of the station, the East Walpole Industrial Track diverges from the mainline, which becomes a single track. The station has two low-level side platforms, with accessible mini-high platforms at their southern ends. Two parking lots – a large lot east of the tracks, and a smaller lot on the west side – together have 781 spaces. With 1,041 daily riders in 2018, it is the busiest station on the line outside Boston.

The former station building, located on the west side of the tracks, is owned by the MBTA but has been converted for commercial use. It is a one-story yellow brick building, 28 by 66 feet (8.5 m × 20.1 m), with a bay window on the track side. A raised band of brick encircles the building just below the windows. The hipped slate roof connects with a wooden canopy along the platform. The ridges of the roof are edged with copper rails. Unusually, the downspouts are built into the station brickwork rather than affixed externally.

== History ==
=== Early history ===
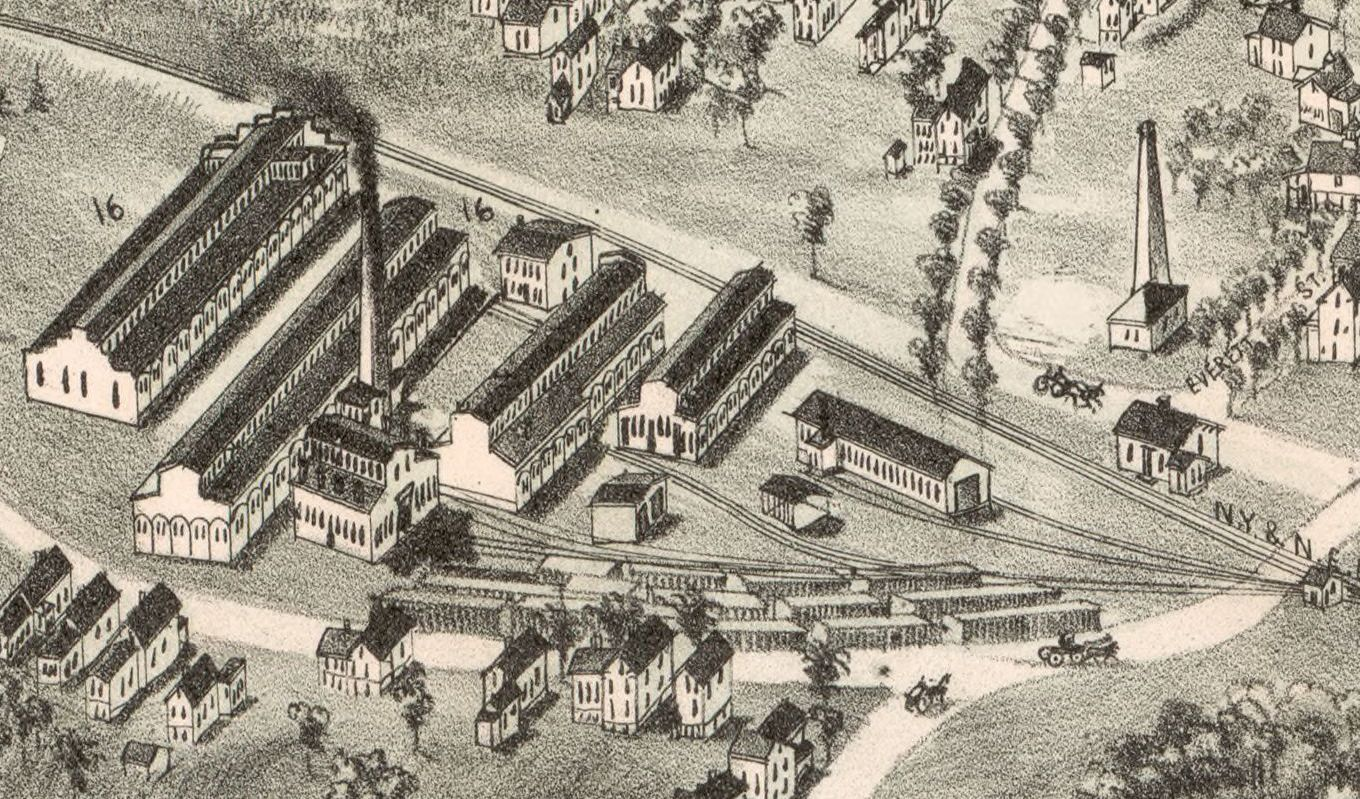
Detail from an 1882 bird's eye view map showing the original station building (right) and the NY&NE Norwood Shops

The Norfolk County Railroad opened from Dedham to Walpole on April 23, 1849. South Dedham was originally the only station in what is now Norwood (then part of Dedham). Dedham Middle station was added around 1852. By 1856 it was called Everett's. A small wooden station building on the west side of the tracks was constructed in 1865. The station became the outer terminus for some short turn service in 1867. Norwood separated from Dedham in 1872; the station was renamed Norwood Central within several years.

The railroad went through several mergers, eventually becoming part of the New York and New England Railroad in 1875. A parcel of land across the tracks from Norwood Central station had been purchased by the railroad in June 1874 to construct new car shops to replace a fire-destroyed facility at Readville. The shops opened in 1876; they were expanded in 1889 for additional use as a locomotive shop. Double track was extended from Islington through Norwood to Walpole in 1873–1881.

=== 1890s changes ===
Norwood Central station and Norwood Depot are located just 0.5 miles (0.8 km) apart. In March 1891, the NY&NE petitioned the Massachusetts Board of Railroad Commissioners for permission to consolidate the two stations and to eliminate grade crossings nearby. The station consolidation had been opposed in a town vote two months earlier. The board approved the railroad's petition on June 25, 1891. An 1890 state law allowed town officials or a railroad company to petition the state to create an independent commission to determine whether a grade crossing could and should be eliminated. The costs of such eliminations were to be paid 65% by the railroad, not more than 10% by the town, and the remainder by the state.

Surveying for the elimination of the Guild Street crossing at Norwood Central and the Washington Street crossing at nearby Winslows station began in July 1891. By November 1892, the crossings of Chapel Street near Winslows and Railroad Avenue were also planned for elimination. However, the railroad objected to bearing 65% of the costs as laid out in the 1890 law, and challenged it in court.

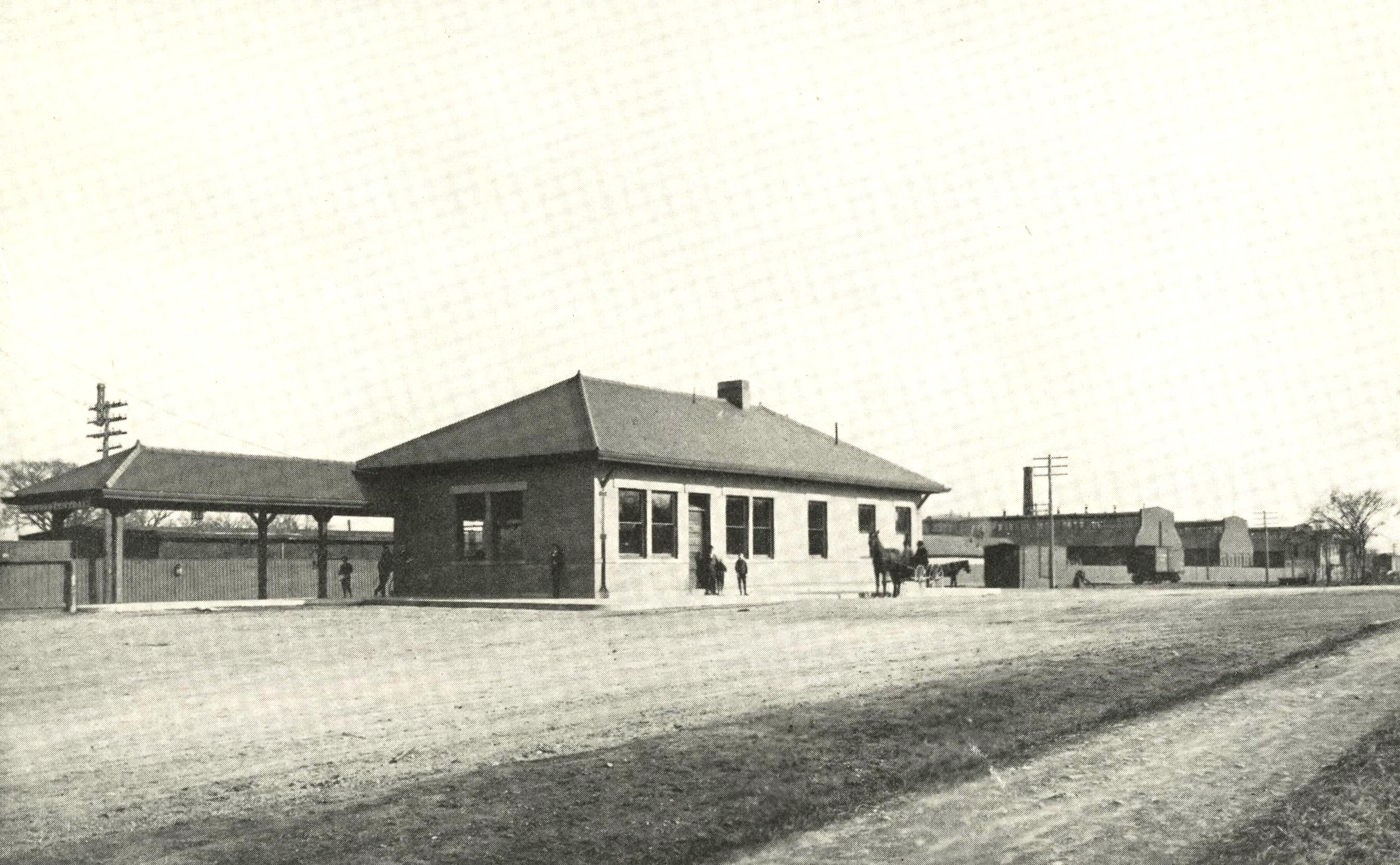
Norwood Central station in 1906

On February 15, 1892, the Old Colony Railroad opened an extension of its Wrentham Branch to Norwood. The Wrentham Branch joined the NYN&NE mainline at Norwood Junction, slightly south of Norwood Central station, and used trackage rights on the line through Norwood. (Wrentham Branch trains left the mainline near Islington, ran on little-used trackage to Dedham, then used lines of the Old Colony-controlled Boston and Providence Railroad to reach Boston.) The New York, New Haven and Hartford Railroad leased the Old Colony and its subsidiaries on March 1, 1893.

In June 1894, the issue of station consolidation again went before the state board. The commissioners approved the replacement of the two stations with a single station between Day and Vernon Streets. A second new station between Norwood Central and Winslows, replacing the latter, was also soon planned. The New Haven acquired control of the NY&NE through its subsidiary New England Railroad on September 1, 1895, and leased the line as its Midland Division effective July 1, 1898.

With both lines through Norwood under its control, the New Haven moved forward with grade crossing elimination. The railroad was placed on a bridge over Guild Street in 1896, followed by Washington Street in 1897. By 1898, the New Haven planned to quadruple-track and grade-separate the line between Norwood Central and Boston, but this was never completed.

In December 1897, a local business association appeared before the Massachusetts Supreme Judicial Court seeking to force the railroad to comply with the 1891 order and build a combined station. A bill was put forward in the state legislature for the same purpose in March 1898. The stations were never consolidated; a new one-story brick station building was constructed by the railroad at Norwood Central in 1899. It was similar to no-longer-extant stations built around the same time at Forest Hills, Atlantic, Quincy, and Warren.

=== 20th century ===
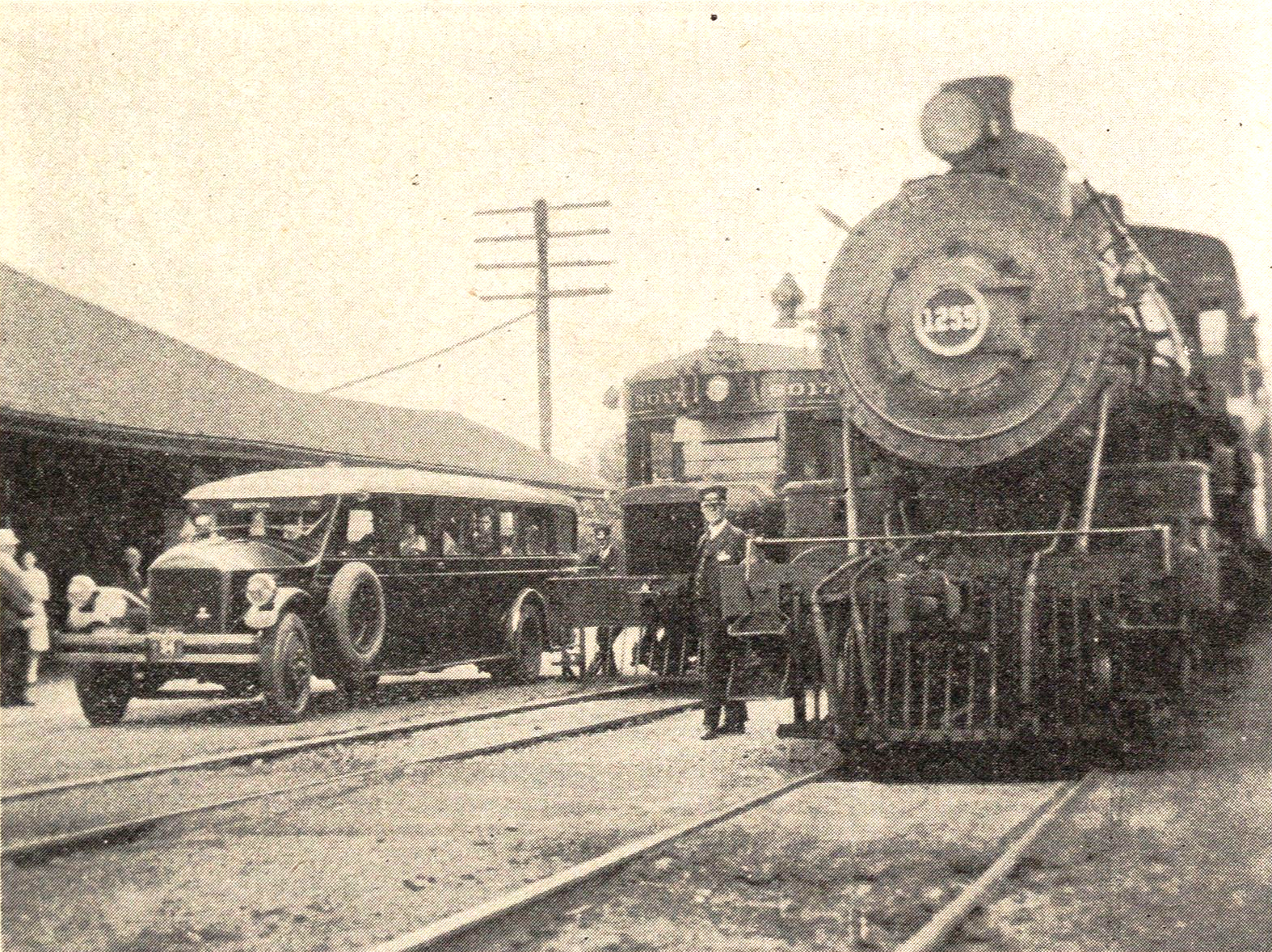
A bus, a gas-electric railcar serving the Wrentham Branch, and a Midland Division train in 1926

The railroad's main car shops were relocated to the new Readville Shops in 1903, though Norwood Shops remained in use for locomotives. The former car shop buildings, closed in 1907, were subsequently used by the American Brake Shore and Foundry Company. The remaining portion of Norwood Shops was closed around 1930; those buildings were sold off to other industrial users or demolished.

Norwood Central short turns decreased from nine daily in 1898 to four in 1906, and were discontinued entirely in 1932. The single daily round trip on the Wrentham Branch was discontinued on July 17, 1938, as part of a massive station closure. Freight service on the line lasted for several more decades; it was gradually abandoned, except for about 1.5 miles (2.4 km) between Norwood and East Walpole, which remains in service as the CSX East Walpole Industrial Track.

The outer portion of the Midland Division was reduced to single track in 1940–41, leaving Norwood Central as the south end of double track on the line. As well as serving local trains, Norwood Central was a stop for most intercity trains to Hartford and Waterbury on the Midland Division. Intercity service was discontinued in August 1955 when Hurricane Diane washed out a bridge near Putnam, Connecticut, leaving just local service on the Midland Division.

=== MBTA era ===
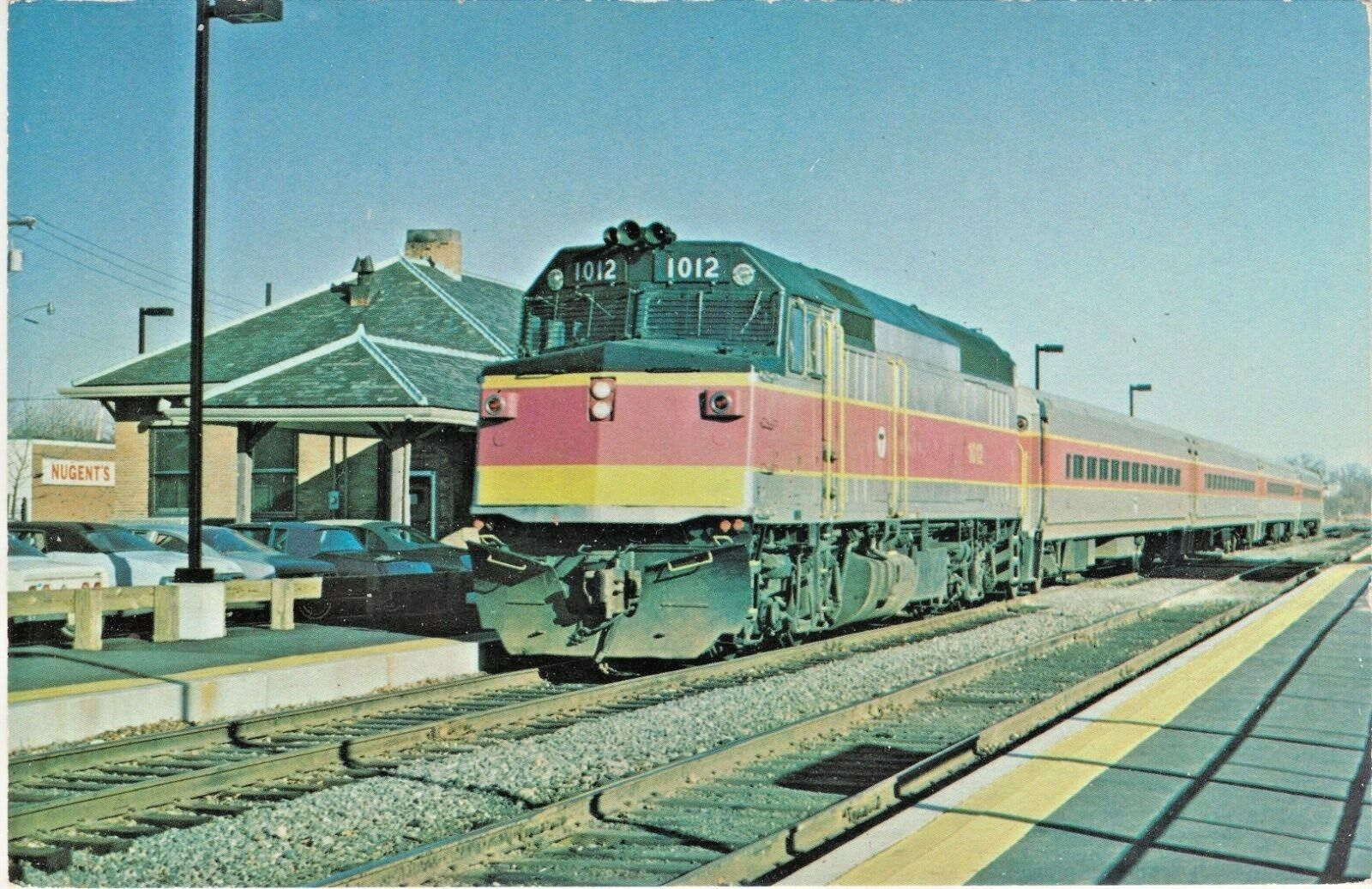
An MBTA train at the recently-renovated station in 1980

The three railroads providing Boston suburban commuter rail service threatened to discontinue remaining service in the 1960s, leading to the formation of the Massachusetts Bay Transportation Authority (MBTA) in 1964. The MBTA began subsidizing service on the Franklin Branch on April 24, 1966. Norwood Central again was a short turn location for some trains from 1967 until at least 1984.

The New Haven merged into Penn Central at the end of 1968. On January 27, 1973, the MBTA purchased most of the Penn Central commuter lines, including the Franklin Branch and Norwood Central station. The MBTA gradually increased service on the Franklin Line from five daily round trips in 1967 to eight in 1975 and thirteen in 1984; Norwood Central short turns were reintroduced in 1967. In 1977, the agency began an $11 million track and station reconstruction project on the line, partially funded by the Urban Mass Transportation Administration, which included improvements to the platforms at Norwood Central.

When Boston–Foxboro service for Foxboro Stadium events was moved to the Franklin Line from 1986 to 1988, Norwood Central was an intermediate stop. The service returned to the Franklin Line in 1995, again with Norwood Central as a stop. Norwood Central was dropped from these special event trains beginning with the 2011 season.

A 1988 MBTA historical survey remarked that the station building "is considered architecturally significant and is a very good, intact example of late 19th-century railroad station architecture", and determined that it was eligible for addition to the National Register of Historic Places. A $1.4 million MBTA project beginning in 1989 included renovation of the station building, accessible mini-high platforms, and parking lot expansion. The MBTA rented the restored station building for commercial use in 1991. The remaining buildings of Norwood Shops were demolished in the 1990s for an expanded station parking lot. Solar panels were installed over part of this parking lot in 2018 – one of the first three of a planned 37 such installations at MBTA parking lots. The 120-year-old Guild Street bridge was replaced in 2016–17.
