= Endicott station =

Train station in Dedham, Massachusetts, US

Endicott
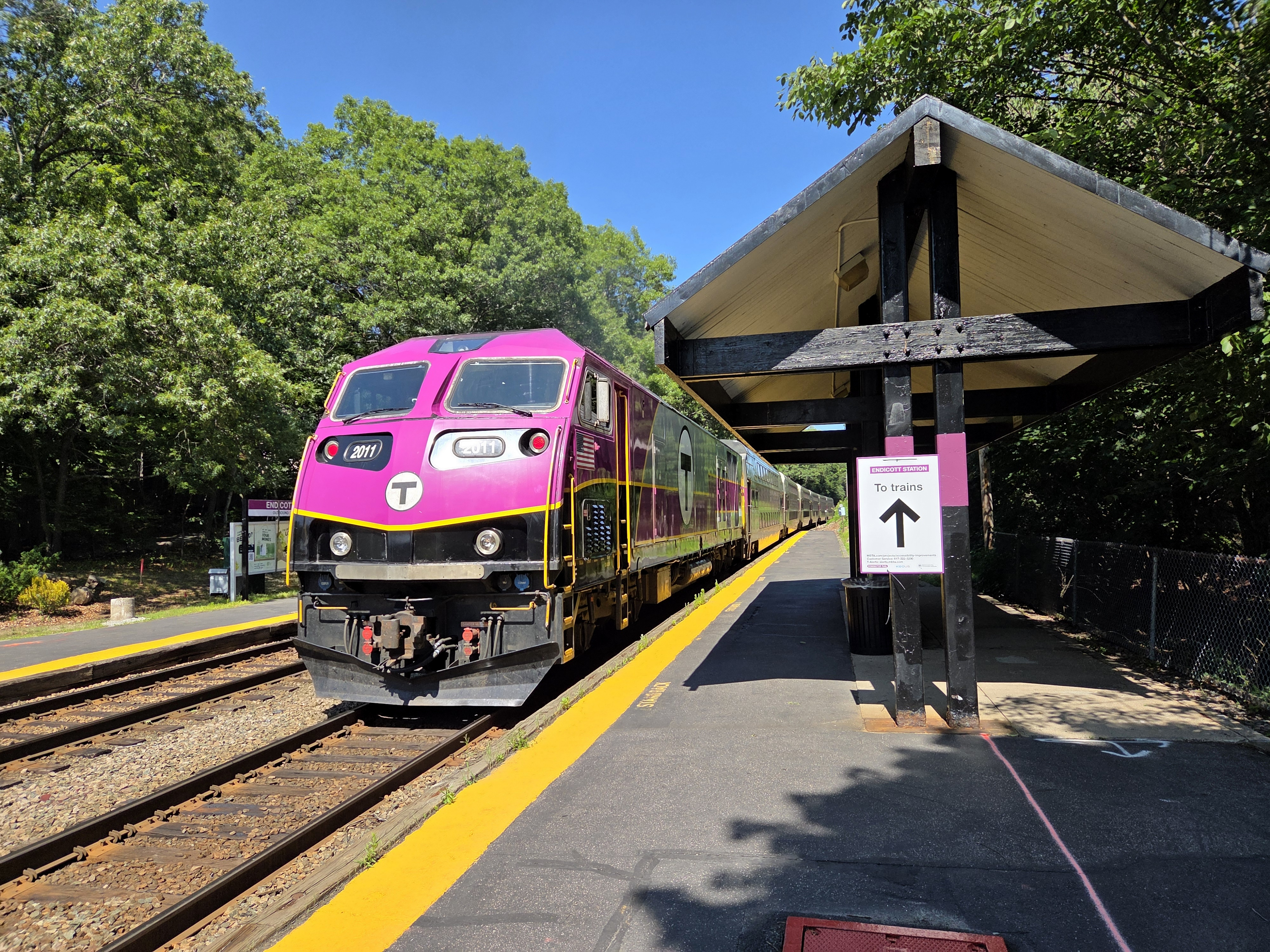
- An inbound train at Endicott station in 2026

General information
- Location: 186 Grant Avenue; Dedham, Massachusetts
- Coordinates: 42.23336°N 71.15839°W
- Line: Franklin Branch
- Platforms: 2 side platforms
- Tracks: 2

Construction
- Parking: 45 spaces
- Accessible: No

Other information
- Fare zone: 2

History
- Opened: January 1, 1855
- Rebuilt: 2026 (planned)
- Former names: East Street, Elmwood

Passengers
- 2024: 297 daily boardings

Services
Preceding station	MBTA	Following station
Dedham Corporate Center toward Forge Park/495 or Foxboro	Franklin/Foxboro Line	Readville toward South Station
Former services
Preceding station	New York, New Haven and Hartford Railroad	Following station
Islington toward Blackstone	Midland Line	Readville toward Boston
Location

Endicott station is an MBTA Commuter Rail station in Dedham, Massachusetts, served by the Franklin/Foxboro Line. It is located off Grant Avenue at Elmwood Avenue. The station is not accessible, though the addition of accessible platforms is planned in 2026.

== History ==
The Norfolk County Railroad opened its Boston Extension (the Midland Branch) from Islington to Boston on January 1, 1855, to end its dependence on the Boston and Providence Railroad (B&P) for access to downtown Boston. A station at East Street was among the original stops on the extension. The line was closed from July 14, 1855, until late 1856 due to a lawsuit over grade crossings in Dorchester, and from 1858 to February 11, 1867, due to financial difficulties of various railroads attempting to operate the line. It reopened under the control of the Boston, Hartford and Erie Railroad.

The station was called East Street during the brief 1850s operations and upon reopening in 1867. The line became part of the New York and New England Railroad (NY&NE) in 1875, by which time the station was renamed Elmwood. It was again renamed to Endicott between 1885 and 1891. Residential development around the station took place in the 1890s.

The NY&NE was reorganized as the New England Railroad in 1895 and came under the control of the rival New Haven Railroad in 1898. Service to Boston operated via the Midland Branch until 1898 and thereafter mostly via the B&P mainline. By the turn of the century, a depot building with a ticket office was located on the north side of the tracks at the foot of Elwood Street. It is no longer extant.

=== MBTA era ===
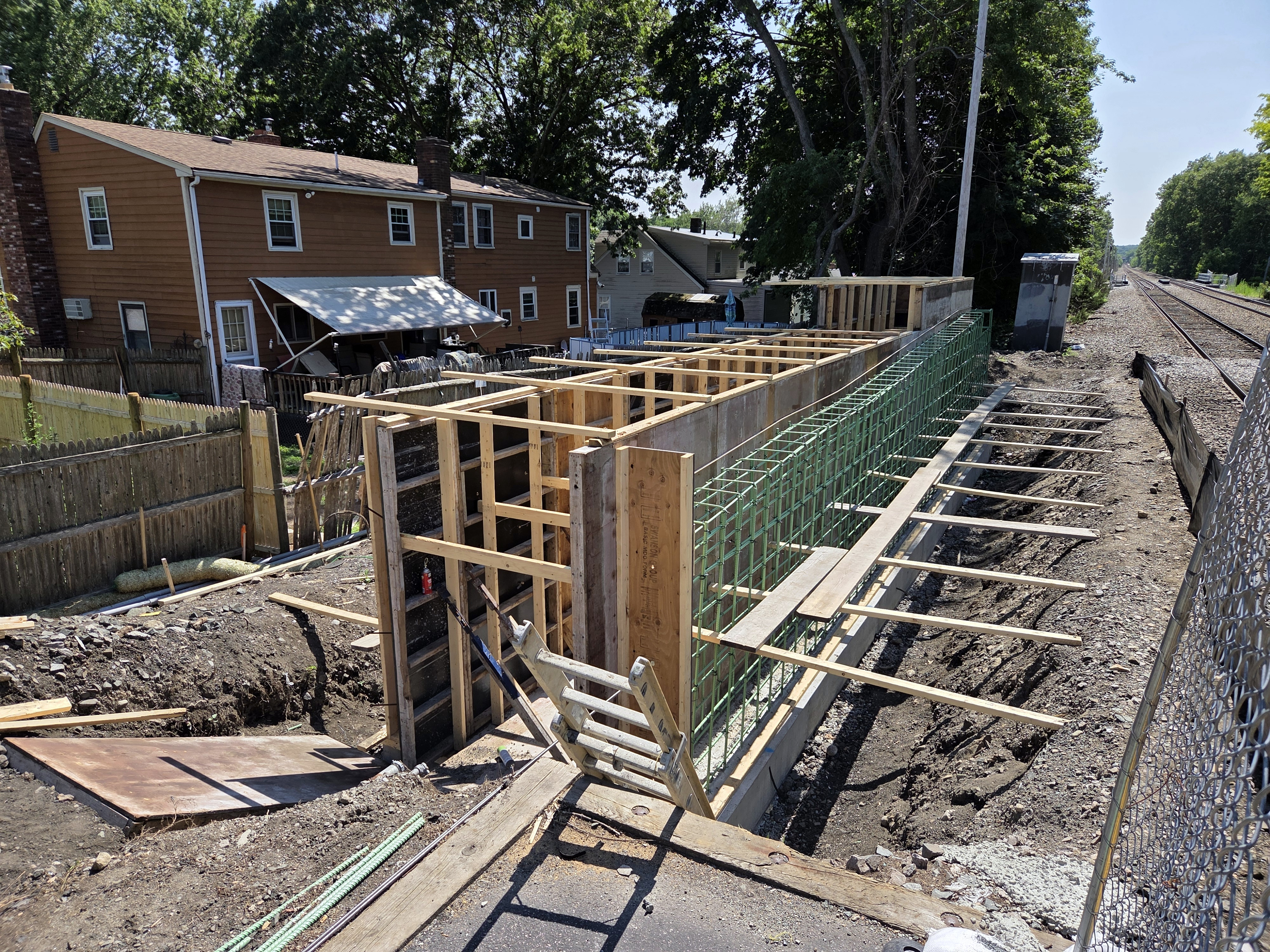
The inbound mini-high platform under construction in July 2026

When Dedham Corporate Center station was being constructed in the late 1980s, the MBTA considered either closing Endicott station or adding a pedestrian underpass, but neither action was taken.

In 2019, the MBTA listed Endicott as a "Tier I" accessibility priority. In 2024, the MBTA tested a temporary freestanding accessible platform design at Beverly Depot. These platforms do not require alterations to the existing platforms, thus skirting federal rules requiring full accessibility renovations when stations are modified, and were intended to provide interim accessibility at lower cost pending full reconstruction. Endicott was planned to be part of the second set of non-accessible stations to be modified with the temporary platforms. Funding for design and construction came from Fair Share Amendment revenues. Design work began in the first half of 2024. As of October 2026, the accessible platforms at Endicott are expected to be complete by the end of 2026.

The rail line crossed East Street on a bridge likely from the beginning of operations; the bridge decks were replaced in 1904. The 1904-built bridge had 12 feet 3 inches (3.73 m) vertical clearance for road traffic, which caused multiple crashes from over-height trucks – eleven between July 2019 and September 2023. A $23.1 million project increased clearance to 14 feet (4.3 m) and added shoulders and sidewalks to the road. In April 2024, the MBTA awarded a $16.5 million contraction contract. Construction began around July 2024; it substantially completed in July 2026 and finished in October 2026.

== See also ==
- History of rail in Dedham, Massachusetts
