= Norwood Depot =

Rail station in Norwood, Massachusetts, US

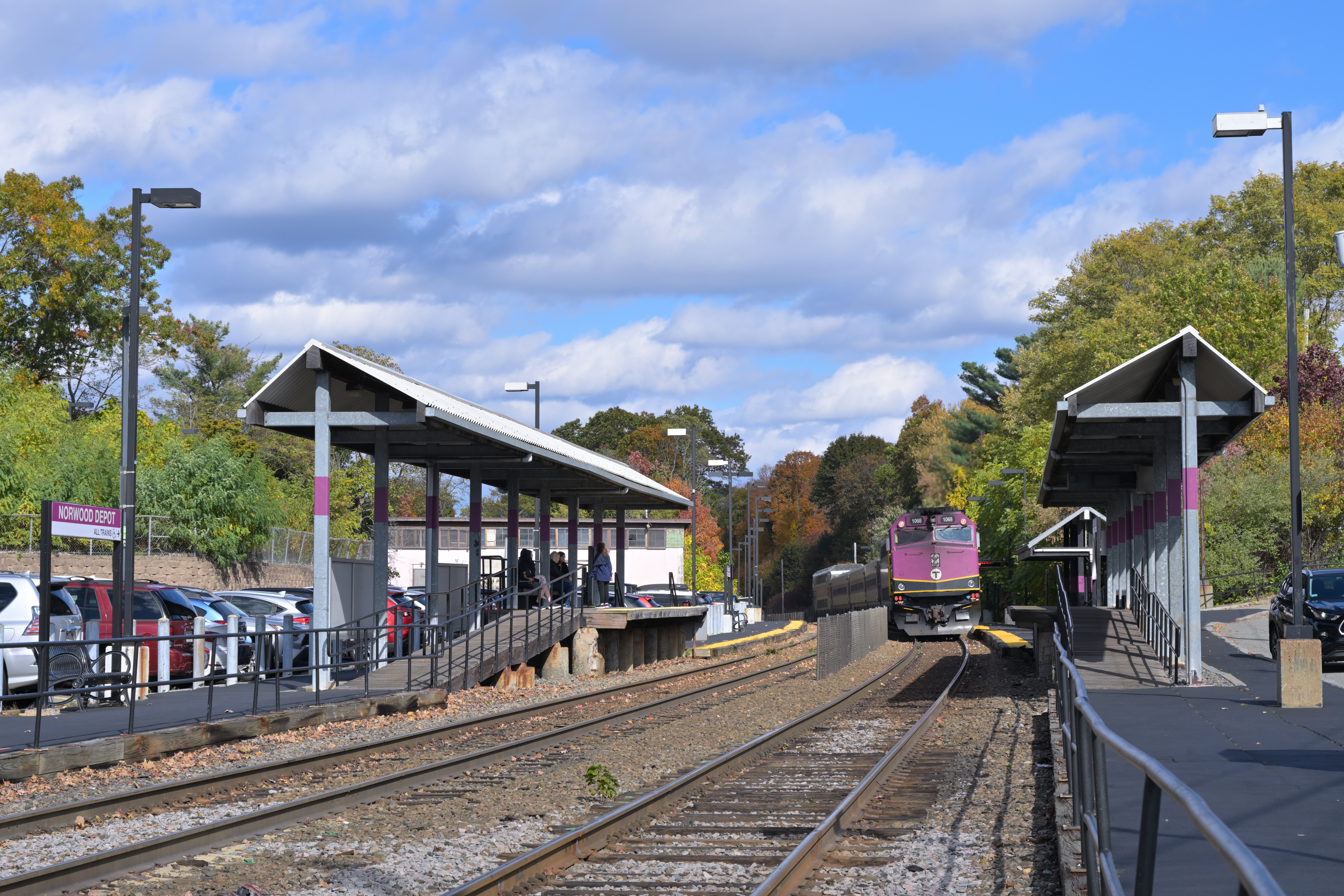
- An inbound train departing Norwood Depot in 2025

General information
- Location: 4 Hill Street; Norwood, Massachusetts
- Coordinates: 42.19634°N 71.19688°W
- Line: Franklin Branch
- Platforms: 2 side platforms
- Tracks: 2

Construction
- Parking: 219 spaces ($2.00 fee)
- Accessible: yes

Other information
- Fare zone: 3

History
- Opened: April 23, 1849
- Rebuilt: 1977, 1992
- Former names: South Dedham, Nahatan, Norwood

Passengers
- 2024: 451 daily boardings

Services
Preceding station	MBTA	Following station
Norwood Central toward Forge Park/495 or Foxboro	Franklin/Foxboro Line	Islington toward South Station
Former services
Preceding station	New York, New Haven and Hartford Railroad	Following station
Norwood Central toward Blackstone	Midland Line	Islington toward Boston
Norwood Central toward Providence	Wrentham Branch	Islington toward Boston
Location

Norwood Depot is an MBTA Commuter Rail Franklin/Foxboro Line station located in downtown Norwood, Massachusetts. The station has two side platforms serving the two tracks of the Franklin Branch, each with a mini-high section for accessibility. The Norfolk County Railroad opened through South Dedham (now Norwood) in 1849, with a station at the modern location. It was renamed Norwood in 1872. The line came under control of the New York, New Haven and Hartford Railroad in 1895. The Massachusetts Bay Transportation Authority (MBTA) began subsidizing service in 1966 and purchased the line in 1973. Under the MBTA, renovations to the station were made around 1977 and 1992.

== Station design ==
Norwood Depot is located in downtown Norwood, about 0.2 miles (0.3 km) northeast of Norwood Common. The two-track Franklin Branch, used by the Franklin/Foxboro Line service, runs approximately north–south through Norwood. The station has two low-level side platforms, with accessible mini-high platforms at their southern ends near the Railroad Avenue grade crossing. Two parking lots are located on the west side of the tracks, with 219 spaces combined. With 285 daily riders in 2018, the station is substantially less used than Norwood Central station.

== History ==
=== 19th century ===
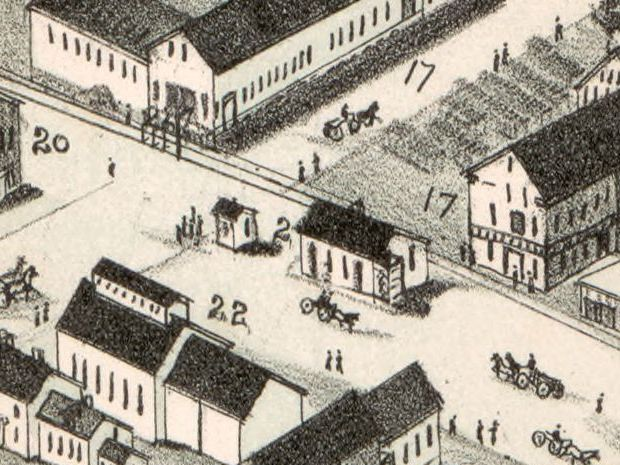
Detail from an 1882 bird's eye view map showing Norwood station

The Norfolk County Railroad opened from Dedham to Walpole on April 23, 1849. South Dedham station (also called Nahatan), located at Railroad Avenue, was originally the only station in what is now Norwood (then part of Dedham). Dedham Middle station (now Norwood Central) was added around 1852. The station was renamed Norwood in 1872 when Norwood separated from Dedham. The railroad went through several mergers, eventually becoming part of the New York and New England Railroad (NY&NE) in 1875. Double track was extended from Islington through Norwood to Walpole in 1873–1881. The station building was a one-story wooden structure on the east side of the tracks.

Norwood Central station and Norwood Depot are located just 0.5 miles (0.8 km) apart. In March 1891, the NY&NE petitioned the Massachusetts Board of Railroad Commissioners for permission to consolidate the two stations and to eliminate grade crossings nearby. The station consolidation had been opposed in a town vote two months earlier. The board approved the railroad's petition on June 25, 1891. By November 1892, the Railroad Avenue grade crossing was planned for elimination, along with three others in Norwood. However, the railroad objected to bearing 65% of the costs as laid out in an 1890 state law, and challenged the law in court.

On February 15, 1892, the Old Colony Railroad opened an extension of its Wrentham Branch to Norwood. The Wrentham Branch joined the NYN&NE mainline at Norwood Junction, slightly south of Norwood Central station, and used trackage rights on the line through Norwood. (Wrentham Branch trains left the mainline near Islington, ran on little-used trackage to Dedham, then used lines of the Old Colony-controlled Boston and Providence Railroad to reach Boston.) The New York, New Haven and Hartford Railroad leased the Old Colony and its subsidiaries on March 1, 1893.

In June 1894, the issue of station consolidation again went before the state board. The commissioners approved the replacement of the two stations with a single station between Day and Vernon Streets. The New Haven acquired control of the NY&NE through its subsidiary New England Railroad on September 1, 1895, and leased the line as its Midland Division effective July 1, 1898. With both lines through Norwood under its control, the New Haven moved forward with some of the grade crossing eliminations. The crossings at Guild Street and Washington Street were eliminated in 1896–97. By 1898, the New Haven planned to quadruple-track and grade-separate the line between Norwood Central and Boston, but this was never completed.

In December 1897, a local business association appeared before the Massachusetts Supreme Judicial Court seeking the railroad to comply with the 1891 order and build a combined station. A bill was put forward in the state legislature for the same purpose in March 1898. The stations were never consolidated, though a new station building was constructed by the railroad at Norwood Central in 1899.

=== 20th century ===
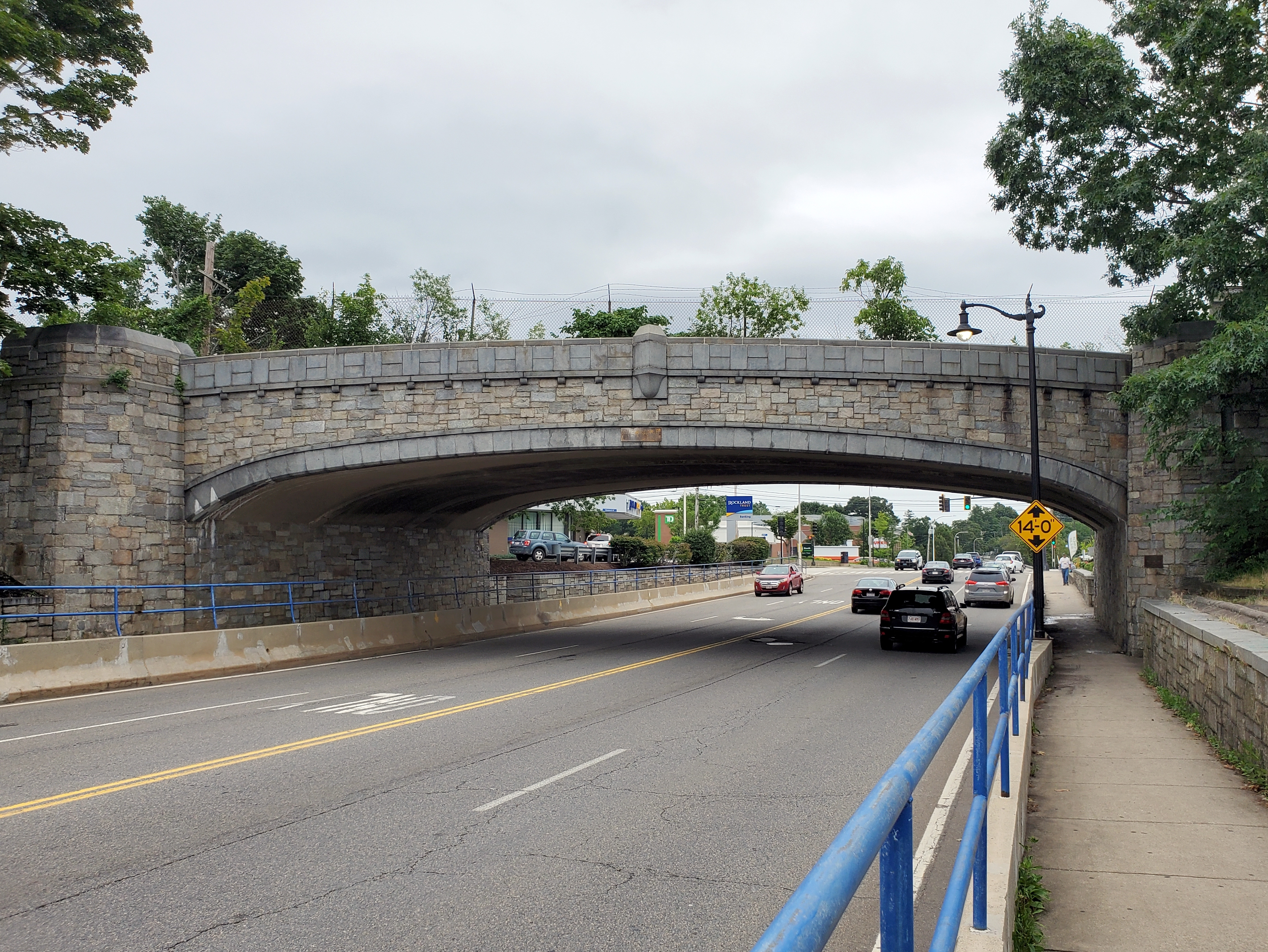
The 1935-built Nahatan Street underpass, which was originally planned to replace the grade crossing at Norwood Depot

By 1930, the Railroad Avenue grade crossing was controversially expected to be replaced by a new underpass at Nahatan Street, about 900 feet (270 m) to the south. The underpass was opened in 1935, but the grade crossing remained open. Service on the line was gradually reduced during the 20th century. The single daily round trip on the Wrentham Branch was discontinued on July 17, 1938, as part of a massive station closure. The station building was demolished in the 20th century. Norwood station was served only by local trains; intercity service stopped at Norwood Central station instead.

The newly formed Massachusetts Bay Transportation Authority (MBTA) began subsidizing suburban commuter rail service on the Franklin Branch on April 24, 1966. The New Haven merged into Penn Central in 1969. On January 27, 1973, the MBTA purchased most of the Penn Central commuter lines, including the Franklin Branch and Norwood Central station. The MBTA gradually increased service on the Franklin Line. In 1977, the agency began an $11 million (equivalent to $44 million in 2024) track and station reconstruction project on the line, partially funded by the Urban Mass Transportation Administration, which included improvements to the platforms at Norwood Central. The MBTA modified a number of station names for clarity around that time. Norwood station was renamed Norwood Depot to differentiate it from Norwood Central. Mini-high platforms for accessibility were added around 1992.
