= Union Station (Walpole, Massachusetts) =

Railway station in Walpole, Massachusetts, US

Walpole
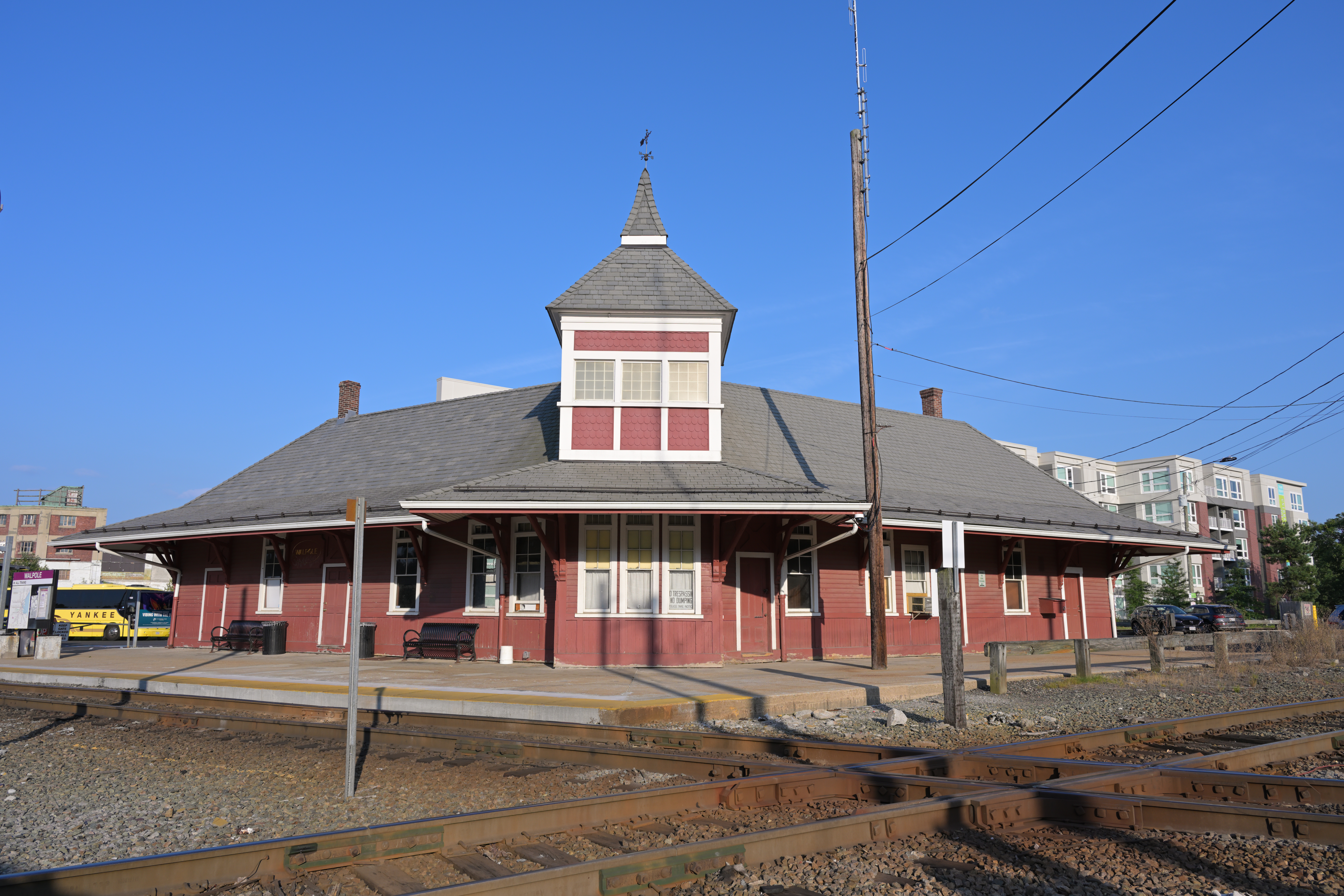
- Walpole Union Station in August 2025

General information
- Location: 275 West Street; Walpole, Massachusetts
- Coordinates: 42.1453°N 71.2579°W
- Lines: Franklin Branch; Framingham Secondary
- Platforms: 1 side platform
- Tracks: 1

Construction
- Parking: 343 spaces
- Cycle facilities: Racks available
- Accessible: Yes

Other information
- Fare zone: 4

History
- Opened: April 23, 1849
- Rebuilt: 1883, 1893, 1978

Passengers
- 2024: 326 daily boardings

Services
Preceding station	MBTA	Following station
Norfolk toward Forge Park/495	Franklin/Foxboro Line	Windsor Gardens toward South Station
Former services
Preceding station	New York, New Haven and Hartford Railroad	Following station
Norfolk toward Blackstone	Midland Line	Plimptonville toward Boston
- Union Station
- U.S. National Register of Historic Places
- Built: 1883
- Architectural style: Victorian eclectic
- NRHP reference No.: 16000139
- Added to NRHP: April 5, 2016
Location

Union Station, also known as Walpole station, is an MBTA Commuter Rail station in Walpole, Massachusetts. It is located at the crossing of the Franklin Branch and Framingham Secondary just west of downtown Walpole. The station has one side platform on the Franklin Branch serving the Franklin/Foxboro Line service, with a mini-high platform for accessibility.

Railroad service to Walpole began with the Norfolk County Railroad on April 23, 1849. Walpole became a railroad junction when the Mansfield and Framingham Railroad opened in 1870, and an interlocking tower was built in 1882 to control the junction. The next year, the separate stations on the two lines were replaced with a union station at the junction. The structure burned in 1893 and was rebuilt as a Victorian eclectic depot with Richardsonian influences—one of the few such buildings in the state constructed from wood rather than stone. By 1898, both lines were controlled by the New Haven Railroad, with the ex-Norfolk County Railroad as the Midland Division.

Passenger service on the Mansfield–Framingham line ended in 1933, and intercity service on the Midland Division ended in 1955. The Massachusetts Bay Transportation Authority (MBTA) began funding commuter rail service on the line in 1966, and increased service levels during the 1970s. The 1893-built signal tower was decommissioned in 1994. In 2016, Union Station was added to the National Register of Historic Places.

== History ==
=== Early railroads ===
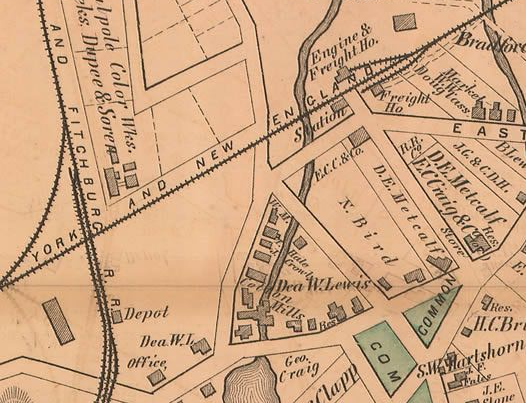
Detail of an 1876 map of Walpole showing the NY&NE station (top right) and the Mansfield & Framingham station (bottom left)

The Walpole Railroad was chartered on April 16, 1846 to run from Walpole to Dedham, where it would meet the Boston and Providence Railroad's Dedham Branch. The Norfolk County Railroad was chartered on April 24, 1847 to run from Walpole to Blackstone; it absorbed the unbuilt Walpole Railroad that July. The Norfolk County Railroad opened from Dedham to Walpole on April 23, 1849, and to Blackstone on May 16. The station was located on East Street at Glenwood Avenue, just north of the town common.

In 1855 and after 1867, the line had more direct service to Boston via the Midland Branch. In 1875, after passing through several companies, it was taken over by the New York and New England Railroad (NY&NE). For several periods—1851–1852, 1864–1867, and 1875–1881—Walpole was the outer limit of local trains timed for commuting. Since then, it has often been the terminal for a small number of short turn trains.

The Mansfield and Framingham Railroad opened between its namesake cities through Walpole in 1870. The station was located south of the crossing with the Norfolk County line, near West Street. Originally, the only track connection between the two lines was in the west quadrant of the junction. The line was acquired by the Old Colony Railroad in 1879.

=== Union Station ===
==== First station ====
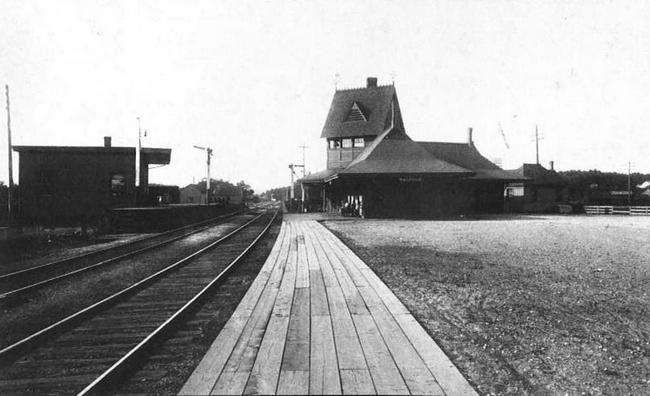
The first Union Station around 1890

The level crossing of the two busy lines proved difficult to manage. After a fatal collision on February 16, 1881, the state Board of Railroad Commissioners recommended the junction be grade-separated. Instead, the railroads chose to install less-costly automatic block signals to protect trains. A three-level interlocking tower was built on the east side of the junction in 1882. (Use of signals to allow crossing other railroads at grade was first authorized by the state legislature that year.) After debate in 1881–82, a union station was built in 1883 to serve both lines. The station was designed by the chief engineer of the NY&NE and constructed for a cost of $10,000 (equivalent to $285,182 in 2024). It had two wings to provide frontage on both railroad, forming a Y-shaped structure with the signal tower.

The older separate stations were converted for use as freight houses and later demolished. A freight house, express house, and express office were also present around the junction. The NY&NE had been double-tracked from Winslow to Walpole in 1881, and on to Franklin in 1882. The Old Colony added double track from Mansfield to Walpole in 1889, but the Walpole-Framingham section was single track until 1910. The Old Colony Railroad was acquired by the New Haven Railroad in 1893.

==== Second station ====
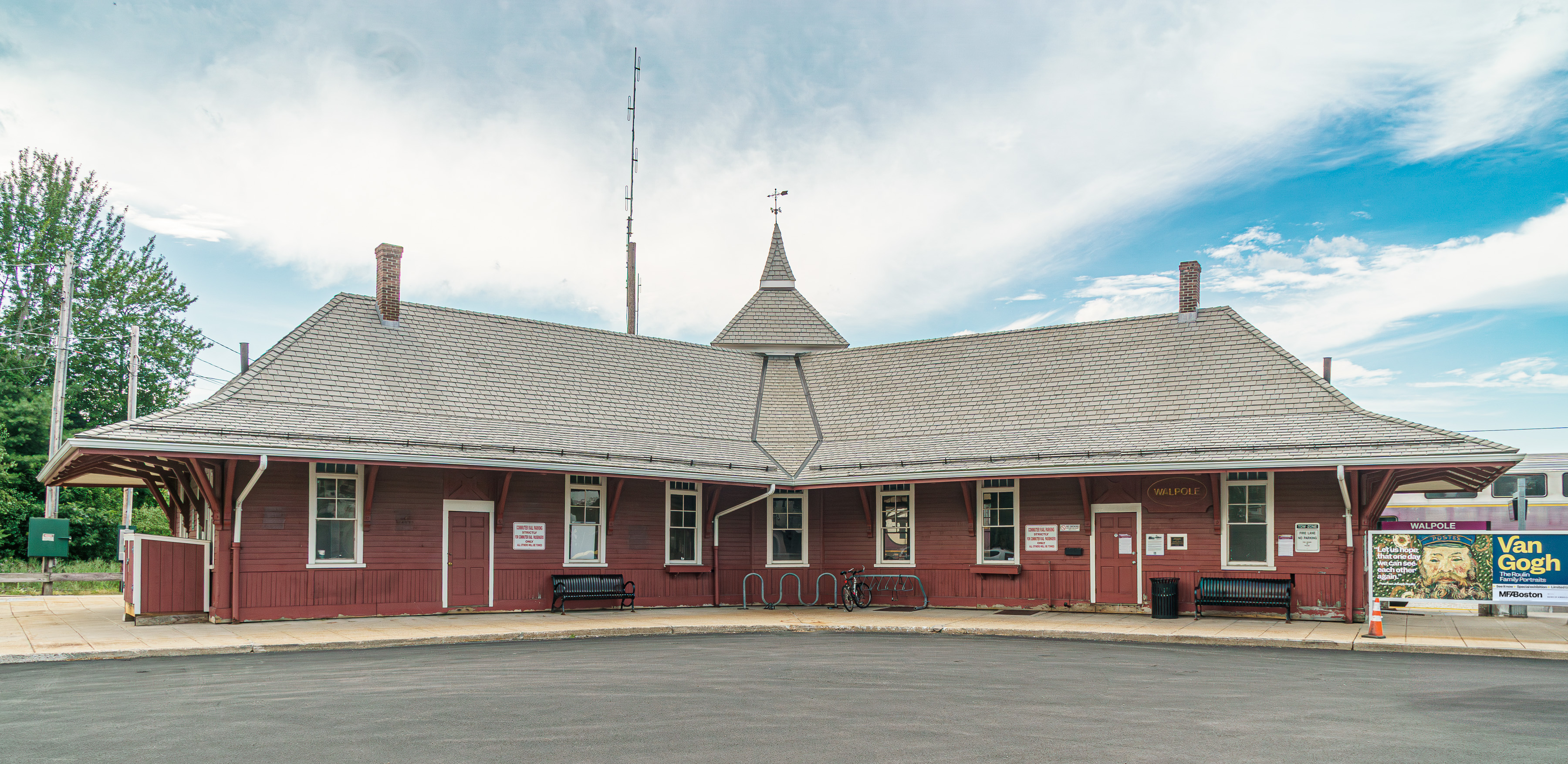
Front view of the 1893-built station

Union Station was destroyed by fire on April 3, 1893. Construction on a replacement station began that August. A separate structure to the south was built to house the signal functions; the tower on the new station was lower and smaller because it was no longer needed to control the interlocking. The new station was otherwise similar to the former station, though the smaller tower and longer wings resulted in a V-shaped profile. The station was constructed in the Victorian eclectic style with Richardsonian Romanesque influences, making it one of the few such stations in Massachusetts (and the best-preserved) to be constructed of wood rather than the heavy stone of H.H. Richardson's designs.

The New Haven Railroad acquired the NY&NE in 1898 as its Midland Division. This placed Union Station under the sole control of the New Haven; after around 1900, it was known solely as Walpole. The New Haven added additional connecting tracks at Walpole: one in the eastern quadrant called "Lewis's Wye', and later one in the northern quadrant. Passenger service ended on the marginal Mansfield-Framingham route (by then reduced to a single track) in 1933, but the line was retained as a freight route. That wing of the building was soon partitioned into offices. The Midland Division was reduced to single track in 1940–41. The 1893-built interlocking tower was removed from service on April 15, 1946, and demolished in May; a new interlocking control station was built inside the station. Intercity service on the Midland Division ended in 1955 when flooding from Hurricane Diane washed out a bridge at Putnam, Connecticut, leaving only commuter service on the line.

=== MBTA era ===
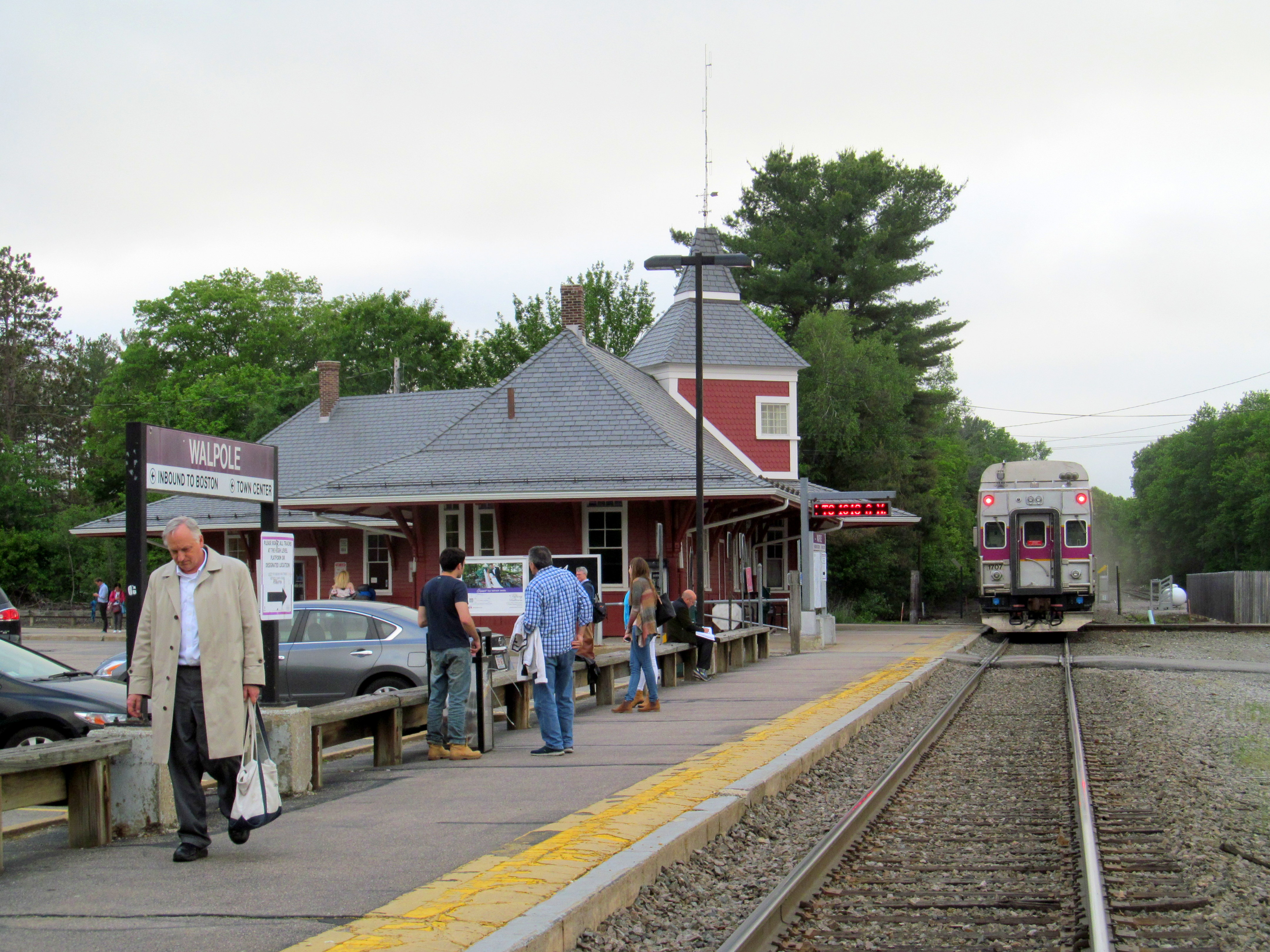
A Franklin Line train at Walpole in 2017

The newly formed Massachusetts Bay Transportation Authority began subsidizing suburban commuter rail service on the Franklin Branch on April 24, 1966. Penn Central, which had absorbed the bankrupt New Haven Railroad, added an antenna tower at the station on November 14, 1971. On January 27, 1973, the MBTA purchased most of the Penn Central commuter lines, including the Franklin Branch and Walpole station. The station was repainted by volunteers in 1976 as a bicentennial project.

The MBTA gradually increased service on the Franklin Line; in 1977, the agency began an $11 million track and station reconstruction project on the line, partially funded by the Urban Mass Transportation Administration. Concrete platforms and a new parking lot south of the station building were built in July and August 1978. The former express office, located northeast of the station building, was demolished that year. In 1988, the MBTA replaced the semaphore signals protecting the junction—the last such signals in New England—with modern light signals. The signal tower, itself one of the last on the MBTA system, was replaced by centralized traffic control in 1994.

On June 3, 2004, the MBTA board approved a $1.4 million plan for adding 200 parking spaces to the station. The lot, which ultimately cost $2 million, opened on June 22, 2005. Accessible mini-high platforms were originally planned as part of the project, but were not constructed.

Most of the station interior retains its original appearance. A coffee shop operated inside the north wing of the station building until 2009; it was replaced by a similar business several years later. Ticket sales, a waiting room, and restrooms are also available. MBTA offices and storage occupy the south wing. The MBTA performed roof repairs in 2012–13; original slate tiles were replaced by modern PVC, and some finials and cresting were removed.

==== National Register of Historic Places ====
In the 1990s, the station was considered for inclusion on the National Register of Historic Places, but this was deferred because town officials feared inclusion would make future modifications, relocation, or demolition more difficult. After a local bank paid for a preservation consultant, documentation was completed in 2015. In December 2015, the Massachusetts Historical Commission voted to nominate the station to the National Register. The station was added to the National Register on April 5, 2016.

==== Foxboro service and accessibility ====
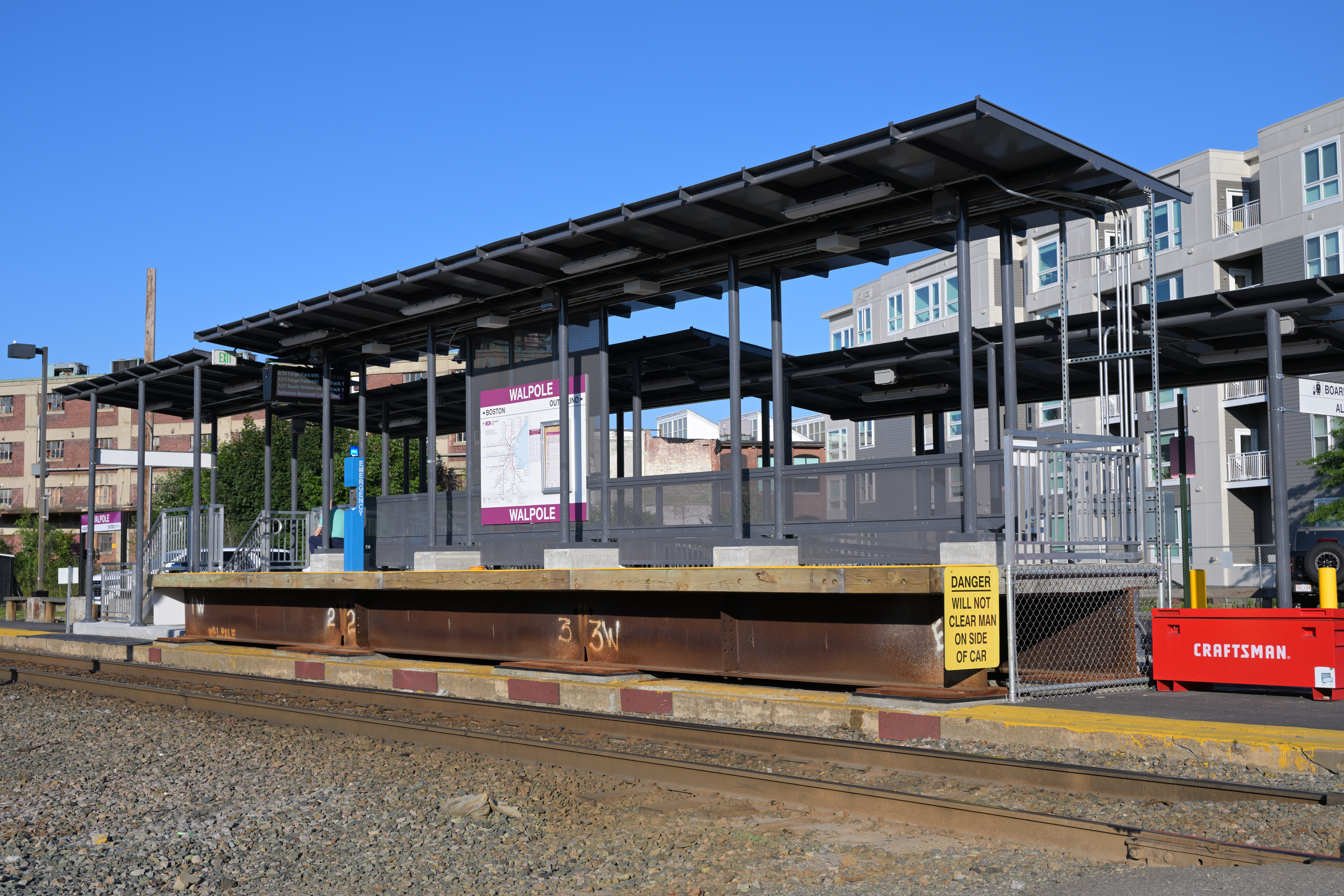
The mini-high platform that opened in March 2025

The former Old Colony line became the Conrail (1976) and later CSX (1998) Framingham Subdivision, then the Framingham Secondary after it was sold to the state in 2015. In August 1971, the New England Patriots moved to Schaefer Stadium (later Sullivan Stadium, then Foxboro Stadium) and special limited-stop game day service to Foxboro station was initiated. Boston–Foxboro service ran from 1971 to 1973, then resumed in 1986. It was changed to a routing via Mansfield from 1989 to 1994, but resumed running via Walpole in 1995. The service switches from the Franklin Branch to the Framingham Secondary at Walpole using Lewis's Wye, but does not serve the station.

The MBTA completed a study in 2010 to determine the feasibility of extending full-time commuter rail service to Foxboro. Foxboro service would have been a shuttle from Walpole, an extension of existing Fairmount Line trains to Walpole and Foxboro, or a mix of the two service patterns. The alternatives using shuttle service included the construction of a high-level accessible island platform at Walpole, located somewhat east of the existing station, to allow cross-platform transfers between shuttle trains and mainline trains.

A year-long pilot of full-time Foxboro service (mostly using extended Fairmount Line trains) began on October 21, 2019. The pilot caused the loss of four inbound and two outbound stops at Walpole, though Foxboro was considered a viable alternative station for much of the area of Walpole. The pilot was put on hold in November 2020; limited midday Foxboro service resumed on May 23, 2022. A new one-year Foxboro pilot began on September 12, 2022; the service was made permanent effective October 2, 2023.

In 2019, the MBTA listed Walpole as a "Tier I" accessibility priority. In 2024, the MBTA tested a temporary freestanding accessible platform design at Beverly Depot. These platforms do not require alterations to the existing platforms, thus skirting federal rules requiring full accessibility renovations when stations are modified, and were intended to provide interim accessibility at lower cost pending full reconstruction. Walpole was one of the first four non-accessible stations to be modified with the temporary platforms, with construction beginning in 2024. The mini-high platform opened on March 31, 2025.

In 2019–2020, the MBTA added double track from just west of Walpole station to just east of Norfolk station. A further phase is planned to add double track through Walpole station and northeast to Norwood Central. As of November 2024, design work for that phase is expected to be completed in 2025.
