= Islington station (MBTA) =

Railroad station in Westwood, Massachusetts, US

Islington
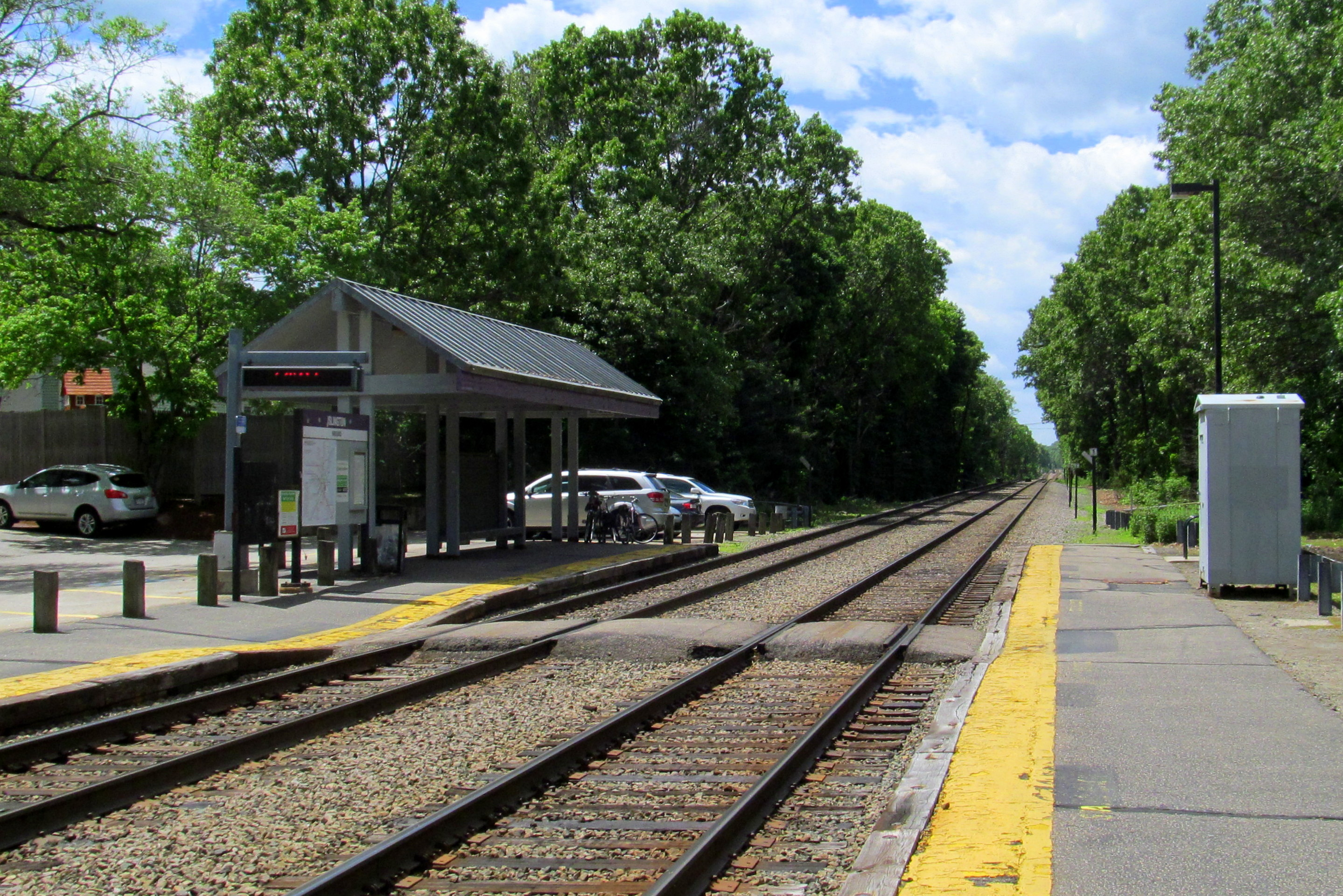
- Islington station in June 2017

General information
- Location: 48 Carroll Avenue; Westwood, Massachusetts
- Coordinates: 42.22106°N 71.18396°W
- Line: Franklin Branch
- Platforms: 2 side platforms
- Tracks: 2

Construction
- Parking: 39 spaces ($4.00 fee)
- Accessible: No

Other information
- Fare zone: 3

Passengers
- 2024: 166 daily boardings

Services
| Preceding station | MBTA | Following station |
|---|---|---|
| Norwood Depot toward Forge Park/495 or Foxboro | Franklin/Foxboro Line | Dedham Corporate Center toward South Station |
Former services
| Preceding station | New York, New Haven and Hartford Railroad | Following station |
|---|---|---|
| Norwood toward Blackstone | Midland Line | Endicott toward Boston |
| Norwood toward Providence | Wrentham Branch | Endicott toward Boston |
Location

Islington station is an MBTA Commuter Rail station in Westwood, Massachusetts. Located in the Islington neighborhood, it serves the Franklin/Foxboro Line. It was formerly the junction between the Norfolk County Railroad's original main line to Dedham (later abandoned) and the Midland Railroad's line to Boston via Readville station. Islington station has low-level platforms and is not accessible. In May 2024, the MBTA indicated the possibility of building accessible platforms shorter than standard length at Islington.
