= Dedham Corporate Center station =

Railroad station in Dedham, Massachusetts

Dedham Corporate Center
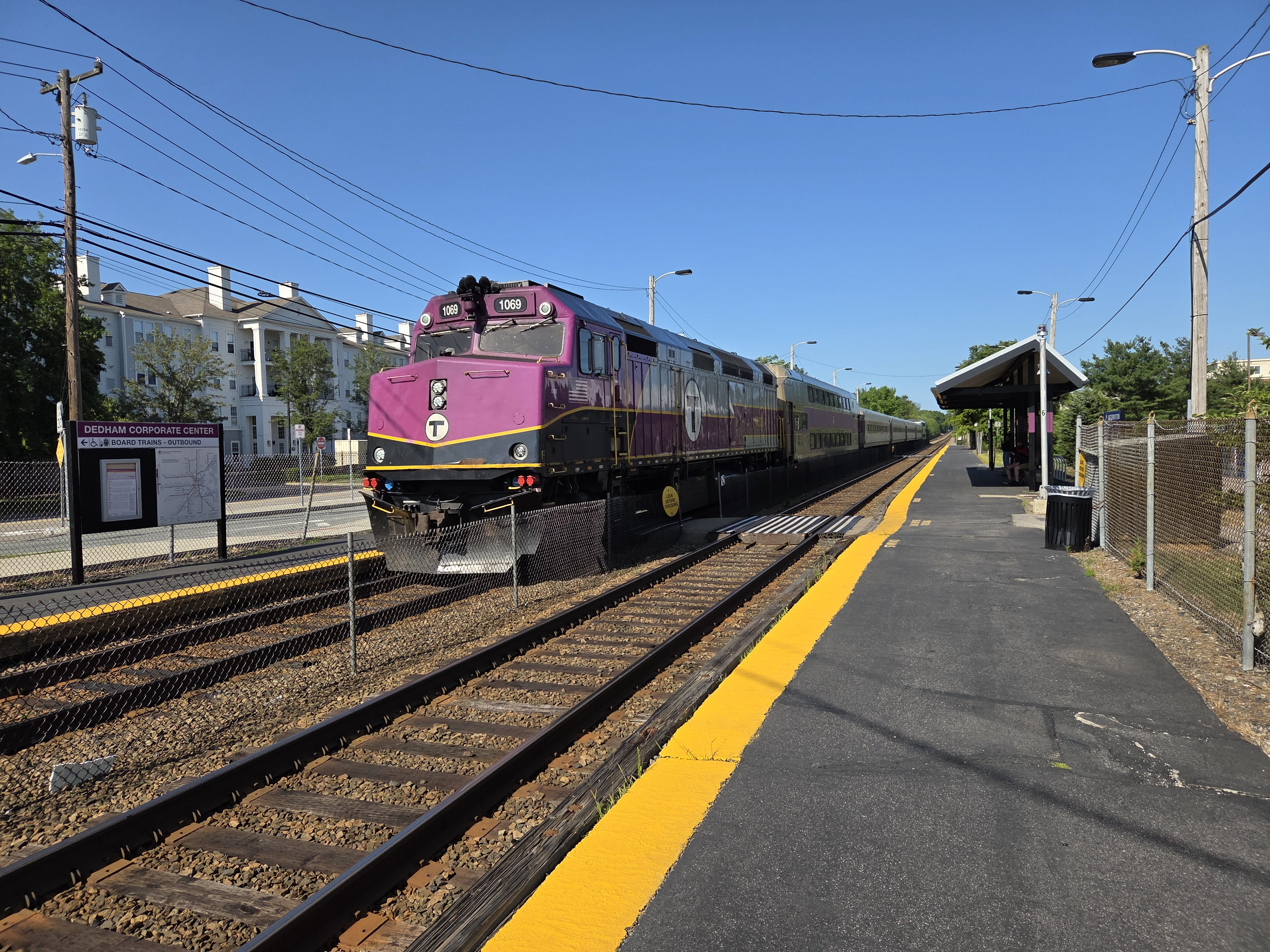
- An outbound train at the station in 2026

General information
- Location: 125 Allied Drive; Dedham, Massachusetts
- Coordinates: 42.22701°N 71.17443°W
- Line: Franklin Branch
- Platforms: 2 side platforms
- Tracks: 2

Construction
- Parking: 497 spaces ($4.00 fee)
- Accessible: yes

Other information
- Fare zone: 2

History
- Opened: January 15, 1990
- Former names: Dedham Junction (1881–1899); Rust Craft (1955–1977)

Passengers
- 2024: 437 daily boardings

Services
Preceding station	MBTA	Following station
Islington toward Forge Park/495 or Foxboro	Franklin/Foxboro Line	Endicott toward South Station
Foxboro Terminus	Foxboro event service	Back Bay toward South Station
Location

Dedham Corporate Center station is an MBTA Commuter Rail station in Dedham, Massachusetts. It serves the Franklin/Foxboro Line, and is located just off exit 28 of Interstate 95/Route 128. It serves mostly as a park-and-ride location. The station consists of two platforms (each a long low asphalt platform with a short high-level platform for accessibility) serving the Franklin/Foxboro Line's two tracks. Previous stations named Dedham Junction (1881–1884 and 1888–1899) and Rust Craft (1955–1977) were located near the modern site.

== History ==
=== Dedham Junction ===
The Norfolk County Railroad completed their Midland Division from Islington to Boston in January 1855. No station was originally located at the modern location, which was in the middle of a swamp until the middle of the 20th century. The line passed through several operators and finally to the New York and New England Railroad in 1875.

In 1881, the NY&NE built a branch from Dedham Junction (near the modern station site) to Dedham to replace the Norfolk County's original route to Dedham. This allowed the railroad to (unsuccessfully) compete with the Boston and Providence Railroad's Dedham Loop for Boston-Dedham commuter traffic. The branch was closed in 1884, but reopened in 1888 by state commission order. In 1890 a short leg allowing Dedham-Islington travel for the Old Colony Railroad's Wrentham Branch was opened; trains using this route skipped Dedham Junction station. By 1898, the New Haven Railroad had acquired the Old Colony, NY&NE, and the Boston & Providence. With the New Haven having no need for four routes to the small town of Dedham, the southern branch was soon abandoned. Service via Dedham Junction ended in 1899 and via Islington in 1904.

=== Rust Craft ===
On May 2, 1955, the New Haven Railroad opened Rust Craft station off Rustcraft Road, slightly east of the modern station location. The station served the 1,500 employees of the Rust Craft Greeting Card Company plant, which opened that July. It was the first reverse commute-focused station on the MBTA system and was "hailed as the start of a new era". Rust Craft station was closed in 1977 due to low ridership. On October 25, 1977, a group of teenagers blocked a Conrail freight train by placing a tree across the tracks near the station, then looted the stopped train.

=== Dedham Corporate Center ===
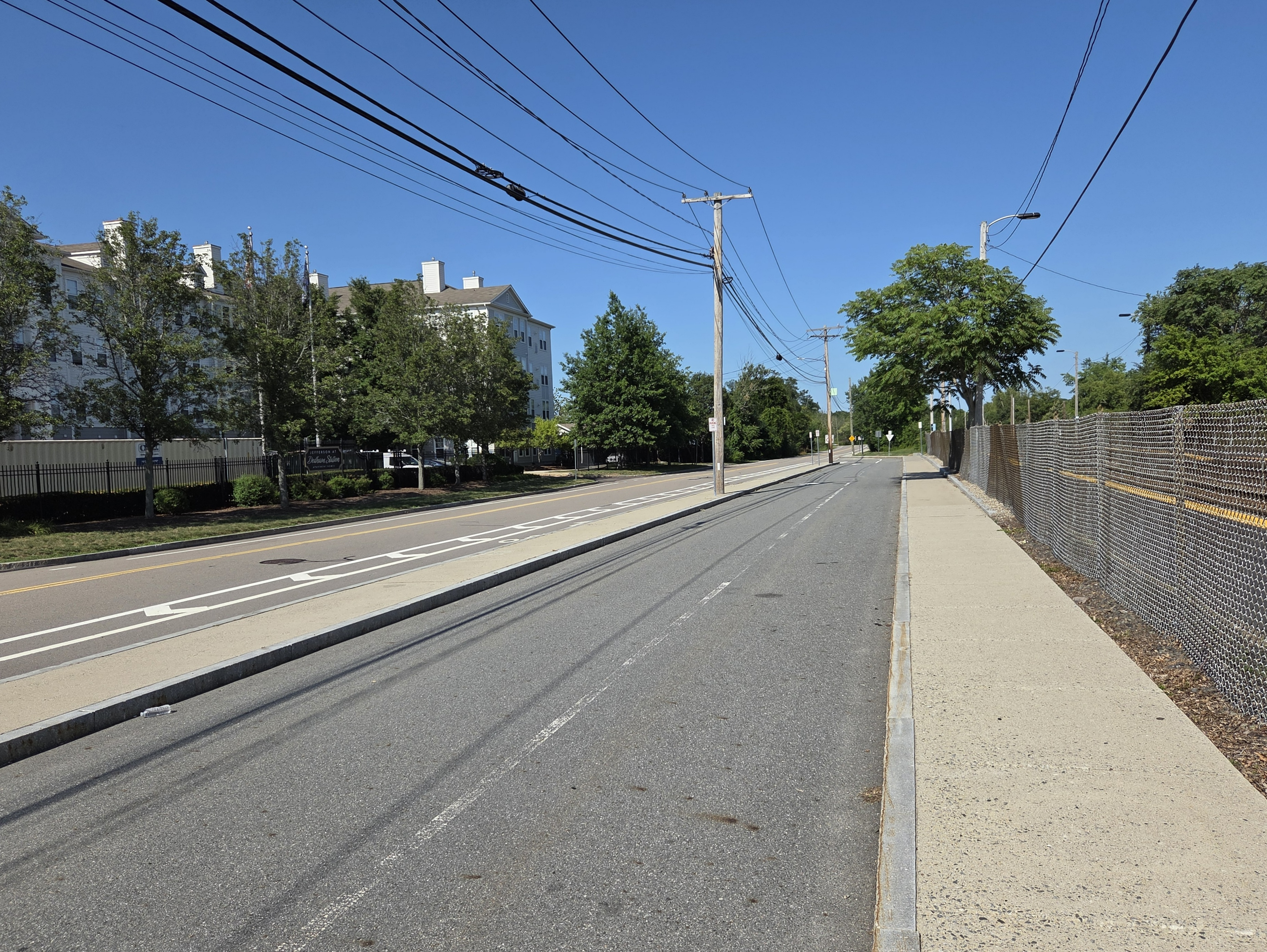
The 2014-built kiss-and-ride lane in 2026

In the late 1980s, the Dedham Corporate Center office park was built nearby due to convenient access to Route 128 and Route 1. The developer, National Development, constructed the station platforms and a temporary 500-space parking lot at a cost of $527,000. The size and temporary nature of the parking lot was intended to avoid lengthy environmental review. National Development had previously donated land for Forge Park/495 station, which had opened in 1988. The development and station were opposed by some residents and local politicians concerned about additional traffic at the East Street rotary.

Dedham Corporate Center station was opened on January 15, 1990. The station initially failed to attract ridership; six weeks after opening, just 44 cars were counted in the parking lot one weekday. The MBTA offered free parking during August 1990 in an attempt to attract riders. A planned parking garage on the north side of the station and a road bridge over the tracks were never constructed. Accessible mini-high platforms were added by 1992. Boston–Foxboro service for events at Gillette Stadium was shifted to the Franklin Line in 1995, with Dedham Corporate Center as an intermediate stop.

There was initially no access to the station from Rustcraft Road on its north side; a nearby apartment complex was forced to operate a shuttle bus to avoid a two-mile walk to the station. A crosswalk and sidewalk providing access were added around 2007. In late 2014, a kiss and ride dropoff lane was built on the north side of the station off Rustcraft Road.

In 2016, the MBTA sought bids for developers to lease the station parking lot for the construction of transit oriented development. A 2017 plan by the Metropolitan Area Planning Council recommended prioritizing pedestrian connections between the station and Legacy Place, as well as on Rustcraft Road. It also recommended redevelopment of the station's parking lot.

== See also ==
- History of rail in Dedham, Massachusetts
