= Franklin/Foxboro Line =

MBTA Commuter Rail line

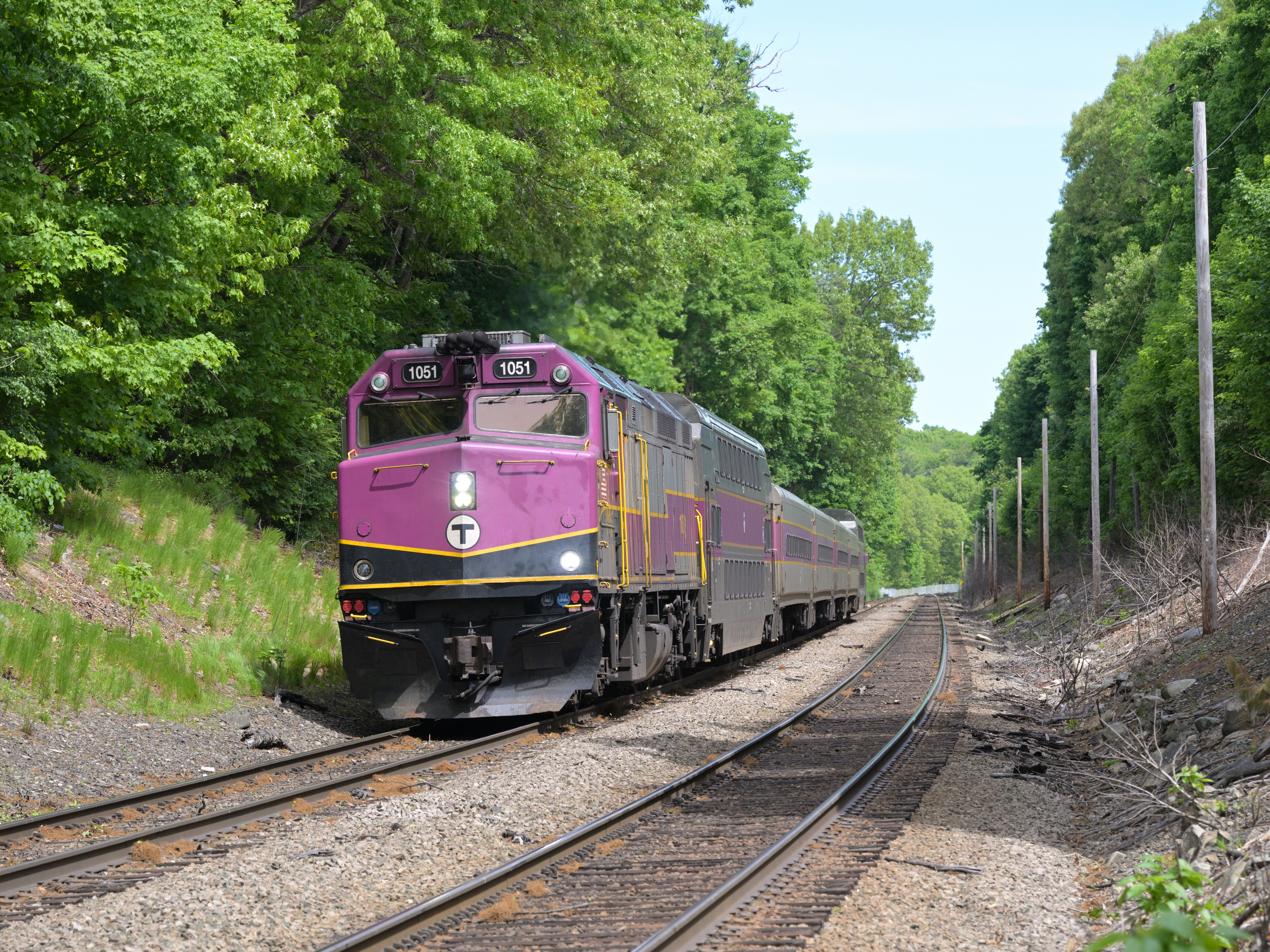
- An outbound train arriving at Norwood Depot in 2026

Overview
- Owner: Massachusetts Bay Transportation Authority
- Locale: Southeastern Massachusetts
- Termini: South Station; Forge Park/495, Foxboro
- Stations: 17
- Website: www.mbta.com/schedules/CR-Franklin

Service
- Type: Commuter rail
- System: Massachusetts Bay Transportation Authority
- Train number(s): 7002-7050, 7101-7148 (weekdays); 6501-6520, 7501-7520 (weekends)
- Operator: Keolis North America
- Daily ridership: 10,398 (2024)

Technical
- Line length: 27.4 miles (44.1 km)
- Track gauge: 4 ft 8 1/2 in (1,435 mm) standard gauge

The Franklin/Foxboro Line (formerly the Franklin Line) is part of the MBTA Commuter Rail system. It runs from Boston's South Station in a southwesterly direction toward Franklin, Massachusetts. Most weekday trains use the Northeast Corridor before splitting off onto the namesake Franklin Branch at Readville, though some weekday trains and all weekend trains use the Dorchester Branch (Fairmount Line) between Boston and Readville.

Foxboro station is located on the Framingham Secondary branch line, which connects with the Franklin Line at Walpole. Previously, trains only served the station during special events at Gillette Stadium. Pilot weekday service to Foxboro ran from October 2019 to November 2020; it resumed in May 2022 and was made permanent in October 2023.

== History ==
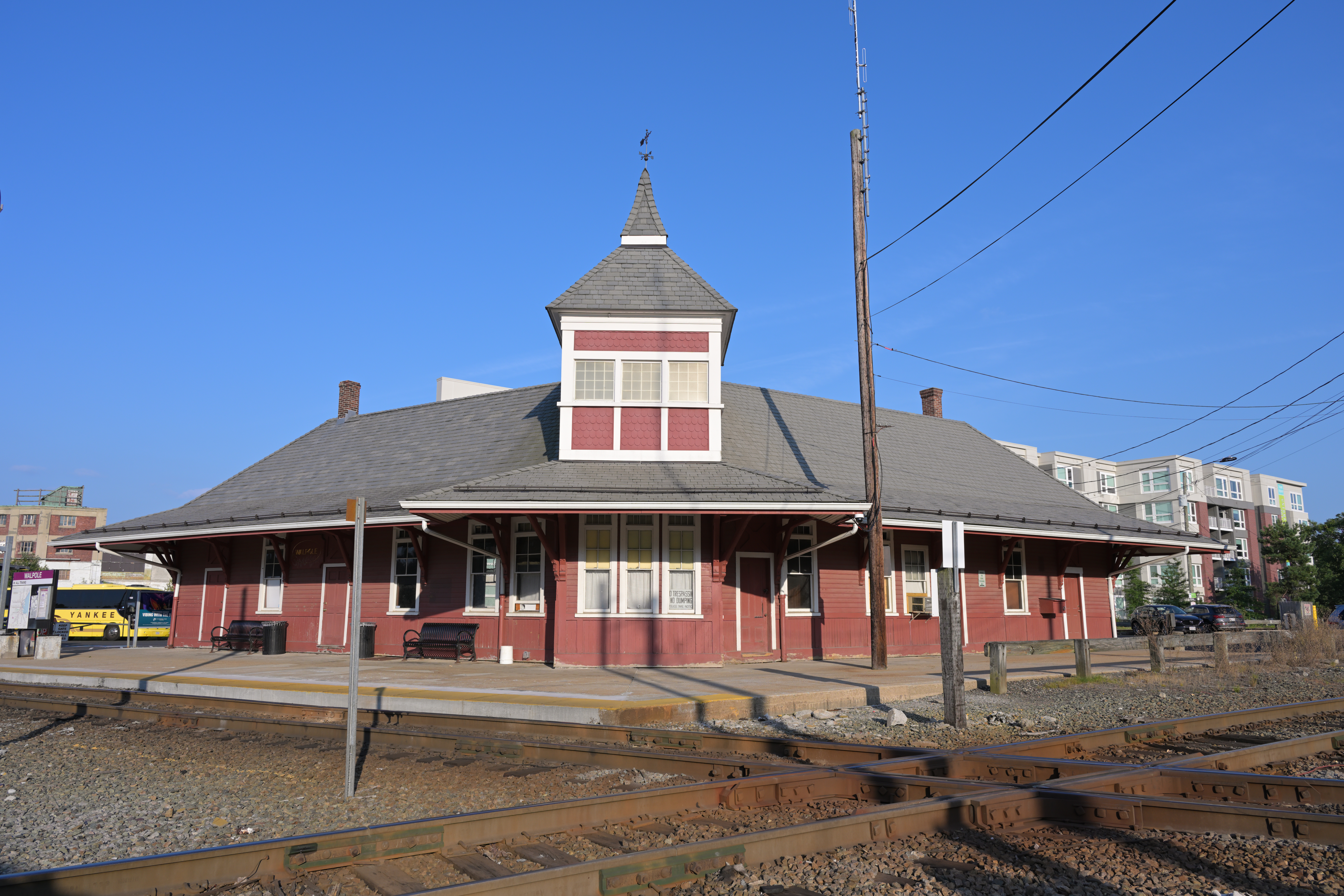
Union Station in Walpole

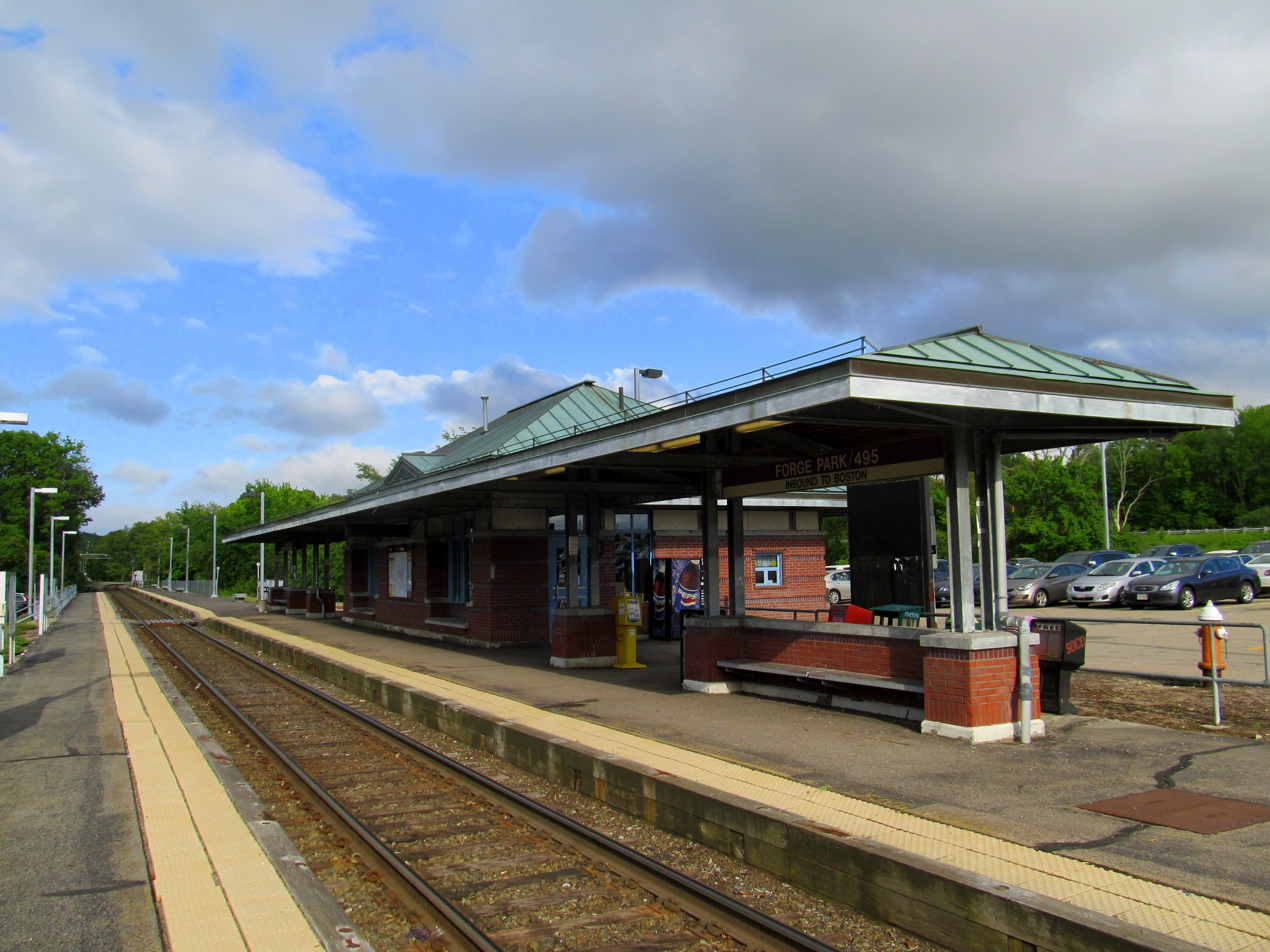
The line was extended to Forge Park/495 station in 1988

The earliest predecessor to the Franklin Line began in 1835 when the Boston and Providence Railroad built a branch from Dedham to Readville, connecting with the main line from Boston to Providence. This was followed, in 1848, by the Norfolk County Railroad, which ran from Dedham to Walpole. After various mergers and acquisitions, the line become part of the New York and New England Railroad until 1898, the New York, New Haven and Hartford Railroad until 1968, and, ultimately, Penn Central until its 1970 bankruptcy.

What is today's Franklin Branch was a portion of the Midland Line of the New Haven's Midland Division, the New Haven's secondary route between Boston and New York; the MBTA's Dorchester Branch and the abandoned segments from Franklin to Willimantic, Connecticut via Blackstone were the remaining components of the Midland Line. In 1910, the passenger route on the Midland Line was a regional inter-city train that continued to New York via the Highland Line segment of the Highland Division between Willimantic and Waterbury, Connecticut, then continuing down the Housatonic Railroad to the New Haven Line. Service was eventually shortened to Waterbury in 1937.

However, in the 1940s and early 1950s service, including the New Haven's Nutmeg and several unnamed trains from Boston to Hartford and Waterbury continued. It was shortened to Blackstone when the two southern spans of the bridge crossing the Quinebaug River in Putnam, Connecticut washed out during Hurricane Diane in 1955. The bridge was never repaired, and the line was abandoned between Willimantic and Putnam in 1959.

=== MBTA era ===
Service to Blackstone was discontinued in April 1966 when the MBTA began subsidizing the line; Franklin and beyond were not in the MBTA district, meaning that the towns themselves had to subsidize service, and only Franklin agreed to do so. The easternmost bridge over the Blackstone River was washed out in the March 17-19th flooding of the river in 1968; the line beyond Franklin was abandoned 3 years later, and is now preserved in full as the Southern New England Trunkline Trail. Between 1973 and 1976, the Commonwealth of Massachusetts bought almost all track assets in Southeastern Massachusetts, including the Franklin Branch, from the Penn Central's bankruptcy trustees. Ridership on the line tripled from 1982 to 1990.

From the start of MBTA operations, Franklin was the terminus of the line. Service was extended to Forge Park/495 station on June 2, 1988, although the line retained its original name. Forge Park/495 is not on the former NY&NE main line to Woonsocket, but instead on the former Milford and Woonsocket Railroad, which last saw passenger service in 1938. The MBTA leased the branch from Conrail for the extension, with the possibility of future purchase. In February 2020, the MBTA voted to purchase the line from Franklin to Milford for $13 million.

=== Double tracking ===
In early 2019, the MBTA begin installation of an additional 3.8 miles (6.1 km) of double track - 3.3 miles (5.3 km) of new track plus the conversion of an existing siding) - between Walpole and Norfolk. Major construction was completed in April 2020. The $30 million construction of an additional phase and preliminary design of a third were announced in November 2019. Phase 2 will add 3.5 miles (5.6 km) of double track between Franklin and Norfolk; it will allow headways to drop from 45 to 35 minutes. Phase 3 is planned to complete double-tracking between just north of Franklin station and just south of Readville station, including the modification of several stations. Total cost of the projects was expected to be $68 million. As of November 2024, Phase 2 is expected to be completed in January 2026, while design work for Phase 3 is expected to be completed in 2025.

=== Foxboro service and COVID-19 changes ===
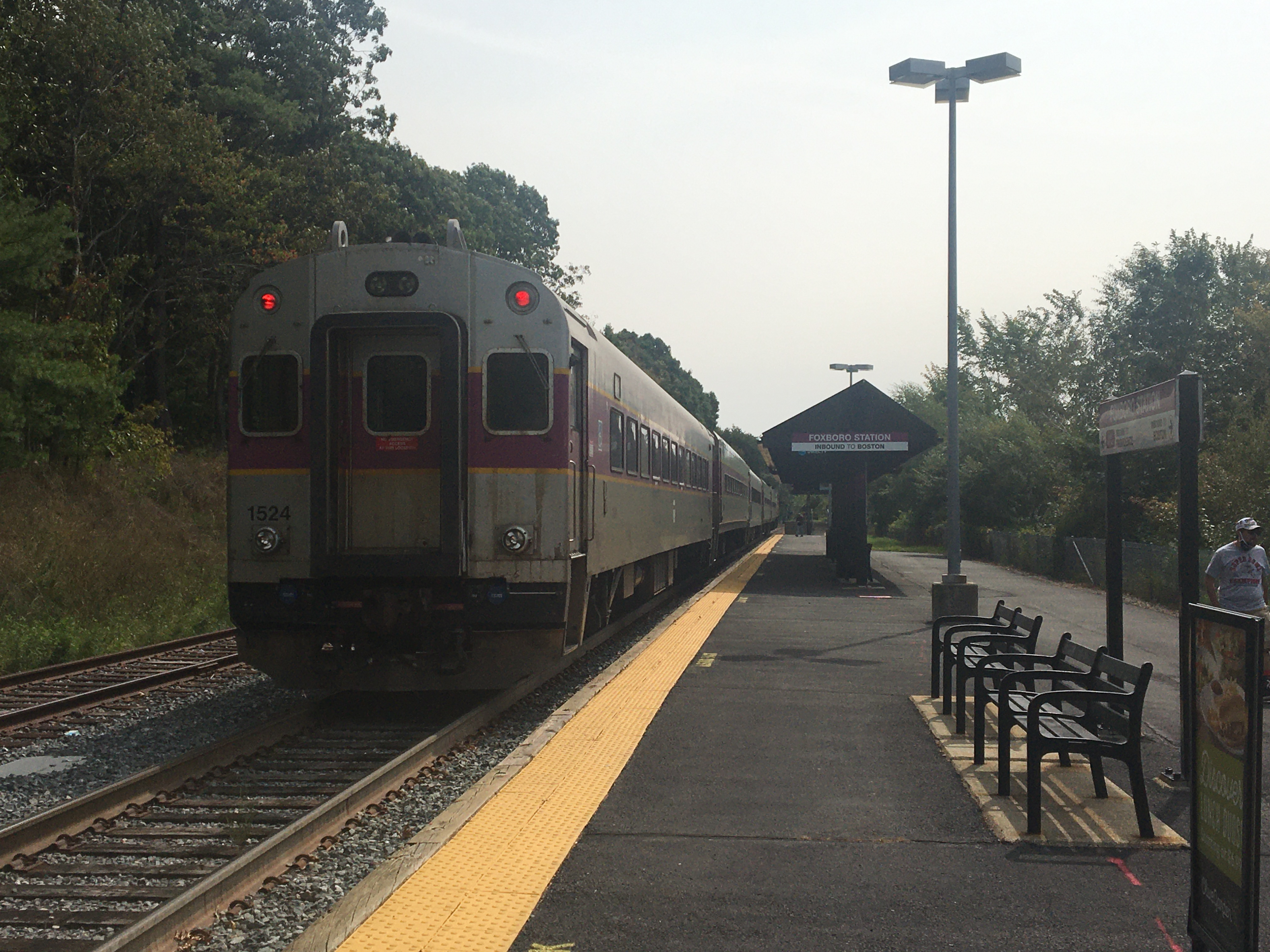
A train at Foxboro station in 2020

From 1971 to 1973 and 1986 to 1988, Boston–Foxboro service for Foxboro Stadium events ran over the Franklin Line to Walpole, then over the Framingham Secondary to Foxboro. Intermediate stops for the 1980s iteration were at Readville and Norwood Central (plus Back Bay in 1988). The service ran over the Providence/Stoughton Line from 1989 to 1994, with a reverse move at Mansfield. It was routed back to the Franklin Line in 1995, with intermediate stops at Back Bay, Dedham Corporate Center, and Norwood Central. Norwood Central was dropped from these trains beginning with the 2011 season.

In September 2010, the MBTA completed a study to determine the feasibility of extending regular commuter rail service to Foxboro station via the Franklin Line. The study looked at extending some Fairmount Line service to Foxboro, running shuttle trains from Foxboro to Walpole, or a combination of both. The MBTA planned to purchase trackage prior to restoring service; the Framingham Secondary, which provides access to Foxboro station, was acquired by the MBTA effective June 17, 2015. (CSX Transportation, the former owner of the branch, retained trackage rights over it.)

In August 2017, the MBTA Fiscal Control Board approved an 11-month pilot program to test commuter rail service to Foxboro, with service planned to begin sometime in late 2018 or early 2019, although Fairmount Line advocates warned it might reduce service quality to existing Fairmount Line stations. In October 2017, the MBTA indicated that service would begin on May 20, 2019. Service during the trial period will consist of seven daily round trips - three during the morning peak period, three in the evening peak, and one midday. The launch date was later delayed to October 21, 2019. By December 2019, daily boardings at Foxboro averaged 70 - one-third of the projected ridership.

Substantially reduced schedules were in effect from March 16 to June 23, 2020. Foxboro pilot service was suspended on November 2, 2020, with the intention for it to resume in Spring 2021. In November 2020, as part of service cuts during the pandemic, the MBTA proposed to close Plimptonville along with five other low-ridership stations on other lines. On December 14, the MBTA Board voted to enact a more limited set of cuts, including indefinitely closing Plimptonville and four of the other five stations. That day, temporary reduced schedules were again put into place.

On January 23, 2021, reduced schedules went into place with no weekend service on seven lines, including the Franklin Line. Service changes on April 5, 2021, added midday service as part of a transition to a regional rail model, with hourly service between Walpole and Boston and less frequent service south of Walpole. Foxboro service was not resumed at that time. As part of that schedule change, all Franklin Line trains operating via the Southwest Corridor began stopping at Ruggles station after an additional platform there was completed. Weekend service on the Franklin Line and the six other lines resumed on July 3, 2021.

Four midday Foxboro round trips – but no peak Foxboro service – resumed on May 23, 2022. The line was renamed the Franklin/Foxboro Line at that time. Some Franklin/Foxboro Line trains began stopping at Forest Hills on September 3, 2022, to provide alternate service during a closure of the Orange Line. Some peak-hour trains continued to stop after end of the closure on September 19. A new one-year Foxboro pilot began on September 12, 2022. As of September 2022, weekday service consists of 10 1/2 Boston–Foxboro round trips and 11 1/2 Boston–Forge Park round trips; weekend service has nine Boston–Forge Park round trips, with no Foxboro service. By October 2022, daily ridership was 8,711 – 75% of pre-COVID ridership.

Foxboro service and the line's renaming were made permanent effective October 2, 2023. Effective May 20, 2024, all weekend Franklin/Foxboro Line trains began operating over the Fairmount Line, with timed transfers to Providence/Stoughton Line trains at Readville station for connections to Ruggles and Back Bay. Daily ridership was 10,398 by late 2024. Beginning on June 2, 2025, most weekend Fairmount Line service was temporarily diverted back to the Northeast Corridor during track work on the Fairmount Line. Midday Foxboro service was temporarily cancelled beginning on August 11, 2025, to allow for expansion of Foxboro station. Midday service resumed on June 1, 2026, after completion of the station construction.

=== Milford extension ===
In July 2011, the Boston Region Metropolitan Planning Organization began studying the viability of extending Franklin Line commuter rail service to Hopedale and Milford. The study would update a 1997 MBTA evaluation that concluded costs outweighed the benefits of a possible expansion. Local officials believe increased population and track upgrades to the Grafton and Upton Railroad may increase the viability of an extension. 8 miles of track from Franklin Junction to Milford were leased by the MBTA from Conrail for the Forge Park/495 extension and to establish the possibility of future service to Milford. A 2004 analysis determined that the extension would cost $70.5 million and attract about 1,800 additional riders per weekday.

== Station listing ==
Fare zone	Location	Miles (km)	Station	Connections and notes
1A	Boston	0.0 (0.0)	South Station	Amtrak: Acela, Lake Shore Limited, Northeast Regional; MBTA Commuter Rail: Fairmount, Fall River/New Bedford, Framingham/Worcester, Greenbush, Kingston, Needham, and Providence/Stoughton lines; CapeFlyer (seasonal); MBTA subway: Red Line, Silver Line (SL1, SL2, SL3, SL4); MBTA bus: 4, 7, 11; Intercity buses at South Station Bus Terminal
1A	Boston	1.2 (1.9)	Back Bay	Amtrak: Acela, Lake Shore Limited, Northeast Regional; MBTA Commuter Rail: Framingham/Worcester, Needham, and Providence/Stoughton lines MBTA subway: Orange Line; MBTA bus: 10, 39
1A	Boston	2.2 (3.5)	Ruggles	MBTA Commuter Rail: Needham and Providence/Stoughton lines MBTA subway: Orange Line; MBTA bus: 8, 15, 19, 22, 23, 28, 43, 44, 45, 47, 65, 85, CT3; Mission Hill Link
1A	Boston	5.0 (8.0)	Forest Hills	MBTA Commuter Rail: Needham and Providence/Stoughton lines MBTA subway: Orange Line; MBTA bus: 16, 21, 30, 31, 32, 34, 34E, 35, 36, 37, 38, 39, 40, 42, 50, 51
	Boston	6.5 (10.5)	Mount Hope	Closed November 2, 1979
1	Boston	8.4 (13.5)	Hyde Park	MBTA bus: 24, 32, 33, 50
2	Boston	9.5 (15.3)	Readville	MBTA Commuter Rail: Fairmount and Providence/Stoughton lines MBTA bus: 32, 33
2	Dedham	10.9 (17.5)	Endicott	
2	Dedham	11.8 (19.0)	Dedham Corporate Center	
3	Westwood	12.5 (20.1)	Islington	
3	Norwood	14.3 (23.0)	Norwood Depot	
3	Norwood	14.8 (23.8)	Norwood Central	
4	Norwood	16.6 (26.7)	Windsor Gardens	
4	Walpole	17.7 (28.5)	Plimptonville	Closed December 14, 2020
4	Walpole	19.1 (30.7)	Walpole	Junction with Framingham Secondary to Foxboro
4	Foxborough	22.6 (36.4)	Foxboro	Located on the Framingham Secondary
5	Norfolk	23.0 (37.0)	Norfolk	GATRA: Medway T Shuttle
6	Franklin	27.5 (44.3)	Franklin	
6	Franklin	30.3 (48.8)	Forge Park/495	Located on the Milford Secondary; MWRTA: 495
	Blackstone	36.4 (58.6)	Blackstone	Closed April 24, 1966
Closed station
