= Norfolk County Railroad =

Railroad in Massachusetts, United States

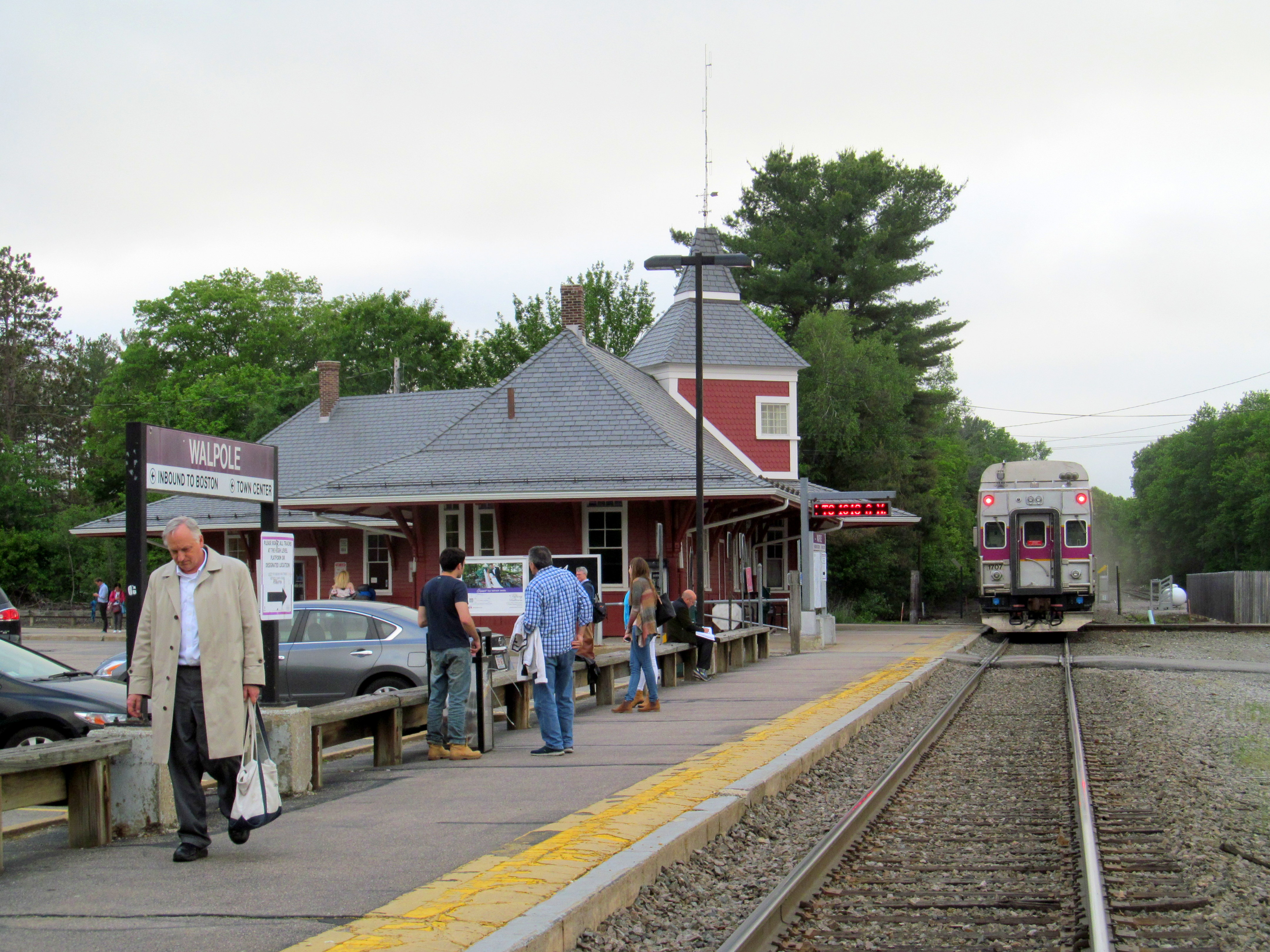
- A southbound Franklin Line train departing the 1883-built Walpole station in 2017

Overview
- Operator: MBTA Commuter Rail (passenger service); CSX Transportation (freight service)
- Dates of operation: 1849–1853; 1858–1867
- Successors: Boston and New York Central Railroad (1853); Boston, Hartford and Erie Railroad (1867)

Technical
- Track gauge: 4 ft 8 1/2 in (1,435 mm) standard gauge

The Norfolk County Railroad was a railroad in Massachusetts, United States. Chartered as two different companies in 1846 and 1847, it completed a rail line between Dedham and Blackstone in 1849. A branch to Medway, Massachusetts was built in 1852. The railroad was leased by the Boston and New York Central Railroad, succeeded by the Boston and Providence Railroad and the East Thompson Railroad, before the Norfolk County Railroad returned to independent operation in 1858. In 1866, the Boston, Hartford and Erie Railroad (later renamed the New York and New England Railroad) leased the Norfolk County. The Rhode Island and Massachusetts Railroad was completed in 1877 from Franklin southward to Valley Falls, Rhode Island, and became a branch of the Norfolk County mainline. The northernmost portion of the main line from Islington to Dedham was rerouted to the east in 1881, and the original alignment abandoned two years later. The New York, New Haven and Hartford Railroad assumed operation of the Norfolk County lines in 1898.

The Norfolk County formed part of a passenger train route between Boston and several Connecticut cities until 1955; the Norfolk County main line was abandoned west of Franklin Junction in 1969. Much of the remaining line forms part of the Franklin/Foxboro Line, operated by MBTA Commuter Rail, with limited freight service provided by CSX Transportation.

== History ==
The Norfolk County Railroad was originally chartered as two companies, the Walpole Railroad in 1846 and the Norfolk County Railroad in 1847, with the two companies merging under the Norfolk County name that year. The company constructed a rail line between Dedham and Blackstone from 1847 to 1849, opening for business that spring. The first train completed a trip from Dedham to Blackstone on May 22, 1849. Such were the company's finances that it declared bankruptcy that same month, as only $400,000 worth of stock had been subscribed to cover the $900,000 in construction costs. With the company $400,000 in debt, the Boston Evening Transcript reported "the stockholders alone will be the sufferers".

Chartered separately, the Medway Branch was completed in December 1852 to join Medway to the Norfolk County mainline in Norfolk. In 1853, the railroad was leased by the Boston and New York Central Railroad, which constructed the Midland Railroad in 1855; this allowed the Norfolk County Railroad to make up part of a route from Boston to New York City via the Southbridge and Blackstone Railroad and then the Norwich and Worcester Railroad, with steamboats completing the link.

The Norfolk County Railroad's mortgage trustees repossessed their railroad in August 1855, and hired the Boston and Providence Railroad to operate it. The East Thompson Railroad took over in 1857, but in 1858 the trustees took direct control and the Norfolk County Railroad name was revived as an independent railroad. Made redundant by the Charles River Railroad, the Medway Branch was abandoned in 1864. After nine years of independence, the Boston, Hartford and Erie Railroad assumed control of the Norfolk County Railroad in December 1866, which subsequently renamed as the New York and New England Railroad. A branch was built to Valley Falls, Rhode Island, in 1877 as the Rhode Island and Massachusetts Railroad (the Valley Falls Branch), connecting to the Norfolk County Railroad main line in Franklin.

The New York, New Haven and Hartford Railroad (the New Haven) succeeded the NY&NE in 1898, using the Norfolk County as a route for passenger trains from Boston to Hartford and Waterbury, Connecticut. The New Haven abandoned operation of the Valley Falls Branch in 1941, keeping only the final two miles from Valley Falls until 1963.

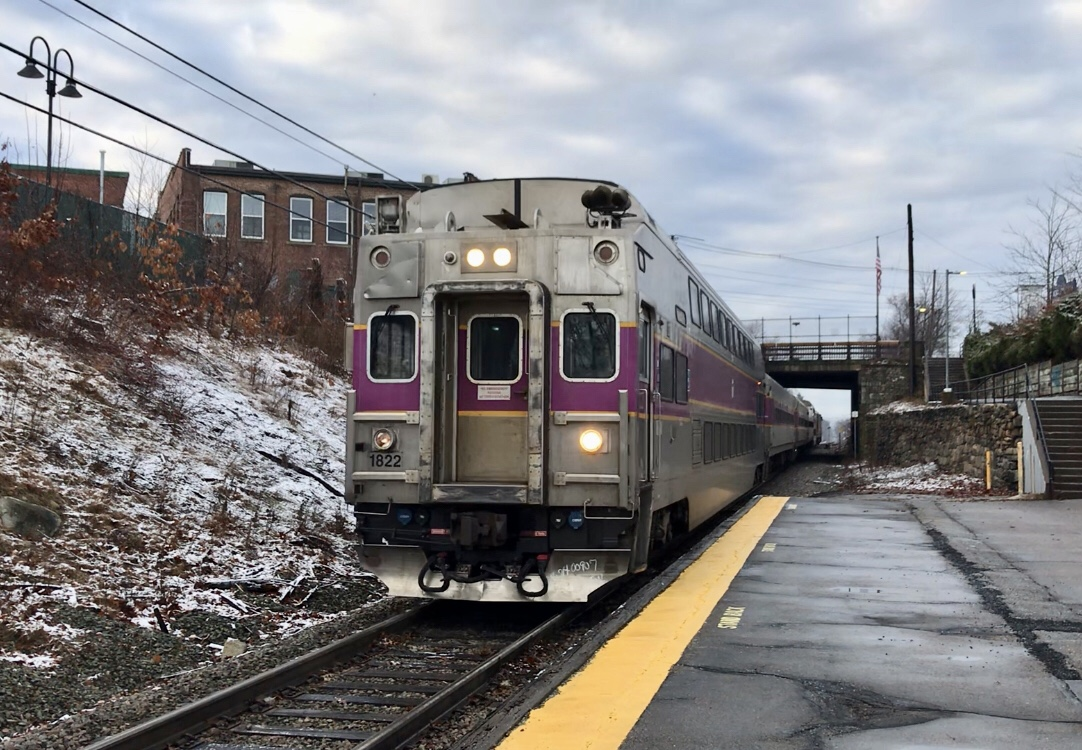
A Franklin/Foxboro Line train at Franklin station in 2023

The passenger route to Connecticut was severed by the 1955 Connecticut floods, and passenger service from Boston cut back to Blackstone. The New Haven received approval to cut these trains as well in April 1966, but offered to keep running them if local municipalities paid for the operating costs; several communities agreed to subsidize operations, but Blackstone did not. Therefore, Franklin became the new terminus of passenger service. The tracks beyond Franklin Junction (two miles west of Franklin) were abandoned entirely in 1969, when Penn Central absorbed the New Haven. MBTA Commuter Rail took over passenger service in 1973, with freight handled by Penn Central, taken over by Conrail in 1976. CSX Transportation has provided freight service since 1999, which as of 2017 was minimal.

== Station listing ==
Municipality	Station	Miles (km)	Comments
Blackstone	Blackstone	0.0 (0.0)	Connection with Providence and Worcester Railroad and Southbridge and Blackstone Railroad
Blackstone	Woonsocket Junction	1.8 (2.8)	Junction with New York and Boston Railroad. Formerly Mill River.
Bellingham	South Bellingham	4.1 (6.6)	
Franklin	Wadsworth	6.2 (10.0)	
Franklin	Franklin	9.0 (14.4)	Junction with Milford and Woonsocket Railroad and Rhode Island and Massachusetts Railroad
Norfolk	City Mills	11.8 (19.1)	
Norfolk	Norfolk	13.5 (21.6)	Junction with Medway Branch. Formerly North Wrentham.
Norfolk	Highland Lake	14.6 (23.4)	Formerly Campbells Pond
Walpole	West Walpole	15.9 (25.5)	
Walpole	Walpole	17.3 (27.9)	Junction with Mansfield and Framingham Railroad
Walpole	Plimptonville	18.8 (30.2)	Formerly Plimptons and Tiltons
Walpole	Windsor Gardens	20.0 (32.2)	Not an original station - opened in 1971
Walpole	Winslows	21.1 (34.0)	Formerly Durfees and South Norwood–East Walpole
Walpole	Norwood Central	21.6 (34.8)	Junction with Wrentham Branch. Formerly Dedham Middle.
Walpole	Norwood Depot	22.2 (35.7)	Formerly South Dedham and Nahatan
Walpole	Ellis	23.4 (37.7)	
Westwood	Islington	23.9 (38.5)	Junction with Midland Railroad. Formerly South Dedham and West Dedham.
Dedham	Dedham	26.0 (41.9)	Junction with Boston and Providence Railroad Dedham Branch and West Roxbury Branch
