= Blackstone station =

Former railroad station in Blackstone, Massachusetts

Blackstone
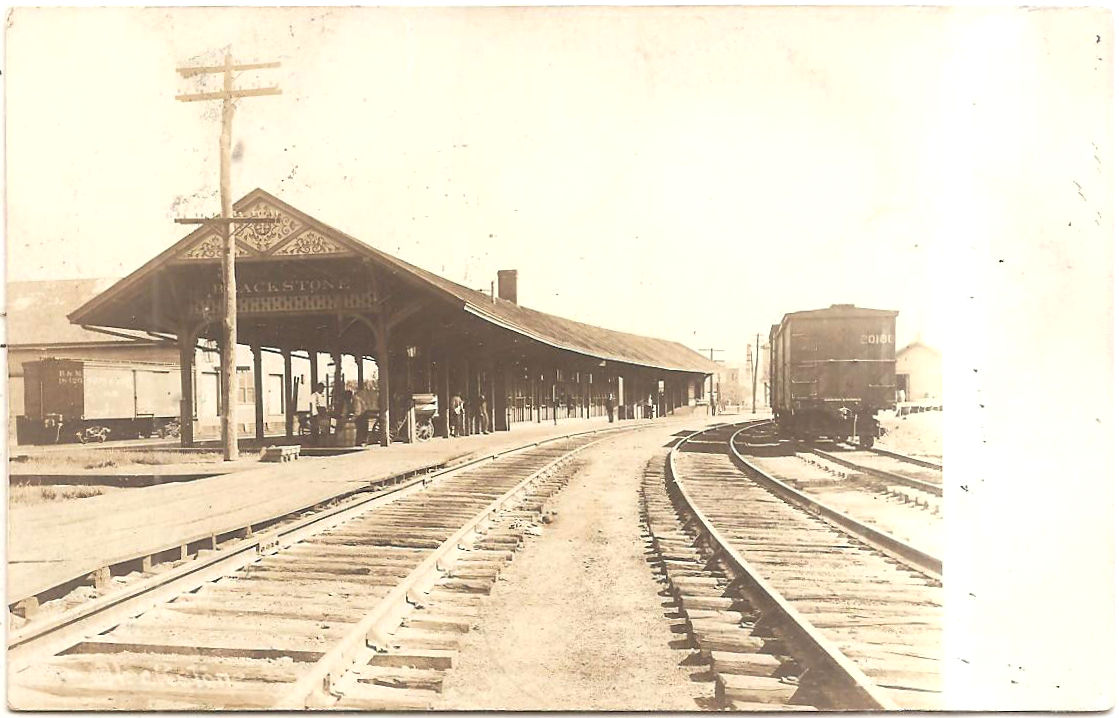
- Blackstone station on a 1909 postcard

General information
- Location: St. Paul Street at Canal Street; Blackstone, Massachusetts
- Coordinates: 42.01585°N 71.53777°W
- Owner: New York, New Haven and Hartford Railroad
- Lines: Midland Division; Providence and Worcester Railroad

History
- Opened: October 1847
- Closed: April 24, 1966

Former services
Preceding station	New York, New Haven and Hartford Railroad	Following station
Terminus	Midland Line ended 1966	Franklin toward Boston
East Douglas toward Hartford	New York and New England Railroad ended 1955	Franklin toward Boston
Millville toward Worcester	Providence and Worcester Railroad ended 1960	Woonsocket toward Providence
Location

Blackstone station was a railroad station in Blackstone, Massachusetts. Opened in 1847, it was a stop for Providence–Worcester service until 1960, and Boston commuter service until 1966.

== History ==
The Providence and Worcester Railroad (P&W) opened on the alignment of the former Blackstone Canal in October 1847. The Norfolk County Railroad opened from Blackstone to Dedham (with a connection to Boston via the Dedham Branch) on April 23, 1849. In 1850, the Boston and New York Central Railroad (B&NYC) completed the Southbridge and Blackstone Railroad between Blackstone and Mechanicsville, Connecticut on the Norwich and Worcester Railroad. That line was infrequently operated until 1867, when the Boston, Hartford and Erie Railroad (BH&E) consolidated the Norfolk County and B&NYC into a single through line.

The BH&E built the Blackstone Viaduct just to the east in 1872, replacing a wooden trestle and an embankment, as part of an improvement program. The railroad completed the Air Line in 1873, placing Blackstone on a New York–Boston through route. The extension was costly, and the BH&E came out of bankruptcy in 1875 as the New York and New England Railroad (NY&NE). The P&W was leased by the New York, Providence and Boston Railroad in 1892, and in turn by the New York, New Haven, and Hartford Railroad in 1895. The NY&NE was under control of the New Haven by 1895, and was leased in 1899 as its Midland Division.

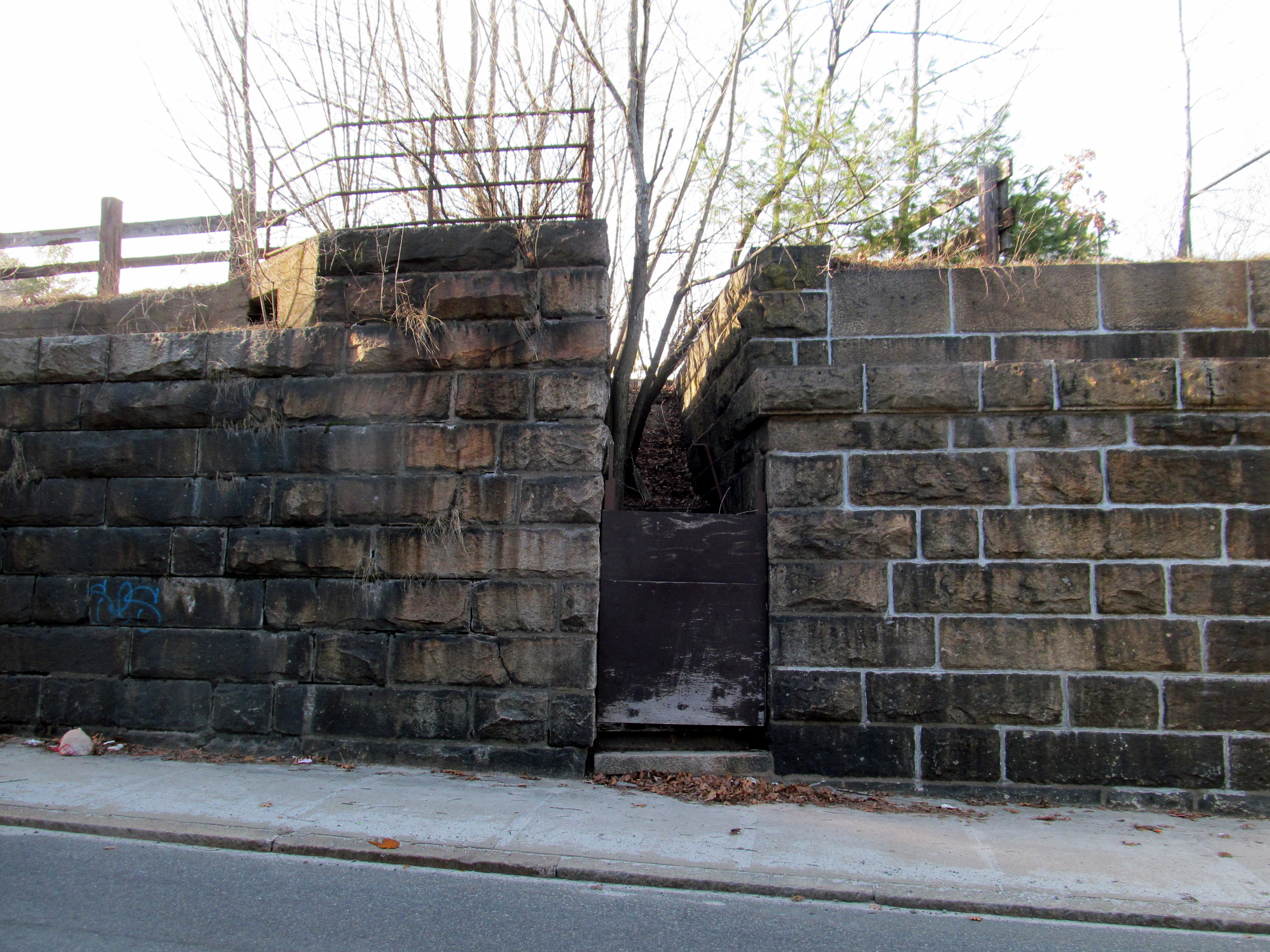
Former entrance to the station, photographed in 2016

Except for a short period in the 1870s, Blackstone generally did not have schedules suitable for Boston commuting. By the turn of the century, it was served by three daily Boston–Hartford round trips and 7–8 Providence–Worcester round trips. Some commuter service was extended to Blackstone in the 1930s, but this was reduced to two Blackstone–Boston round trips plus a Boston–Hartford round trip in 1940. A second long-distance train on the route stopping at Blackstone was added during World War II.

Providence–Worcester service via Blackstone was reduced to one daily round trip by 1935, briefly increased to four in 1953, then reverted to one until discontinued in 1960. Boston commuter service was increased to six daily round trips in 1952, but service west of Blackstone ended in 1955 after rains from Hurricane Diane washed out a bridge near Putnam, Connecticut. The Massachusetts Bay Transportation Authority (MBTA) was formed in August 1964 to subsidize Boston commuter service. The MBTA began subsidizing service as far as Norfolk on April 24, 1966. Franklin agreed to subsidize its service, but Blackstone did not, so service was cut back to Franklin. The disused station was demolished in 1969.

After the collapse of the Blackstone River bridge to the east in 1968, New Haven successor Penn Central was allowed to abandon the Midland Division between Putnam, Connecticut and Franklin in 1969. Most of that section, except the Blackstone Viaduct, has been converted to the Southern New England Trunkline Trail, with the former Blackstone station site as a parking lot. The P&W became independent from Penn Central in 1973 and continues to operate freight service.
