= Stone Haven station =

Former railroad station in Massachusetts, United States

Stone Haven
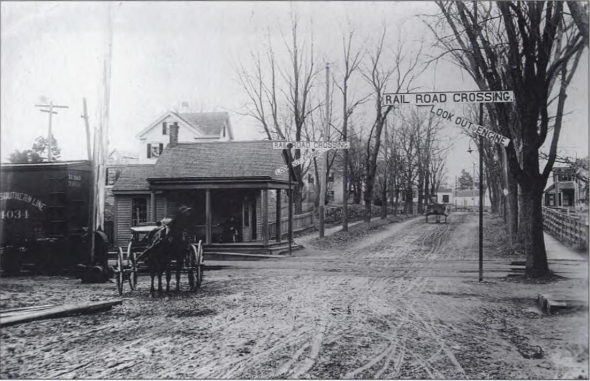
- Stone Haven station looking north

General information
- Coordinates: 42.24696°N 71.16308°W
- Line: Dedham Branch

History
- Closed: April 21, 1967

Former services
Preceding station	MBTA	Following station
Dedham Terminus	Dedham Branch	East Dedham toward South Station
Preceding station	New York, New Haven and Hartford Railroad	Following station
Dedham Terminus	Dedham Branch	East Dedham toward Readville
Location

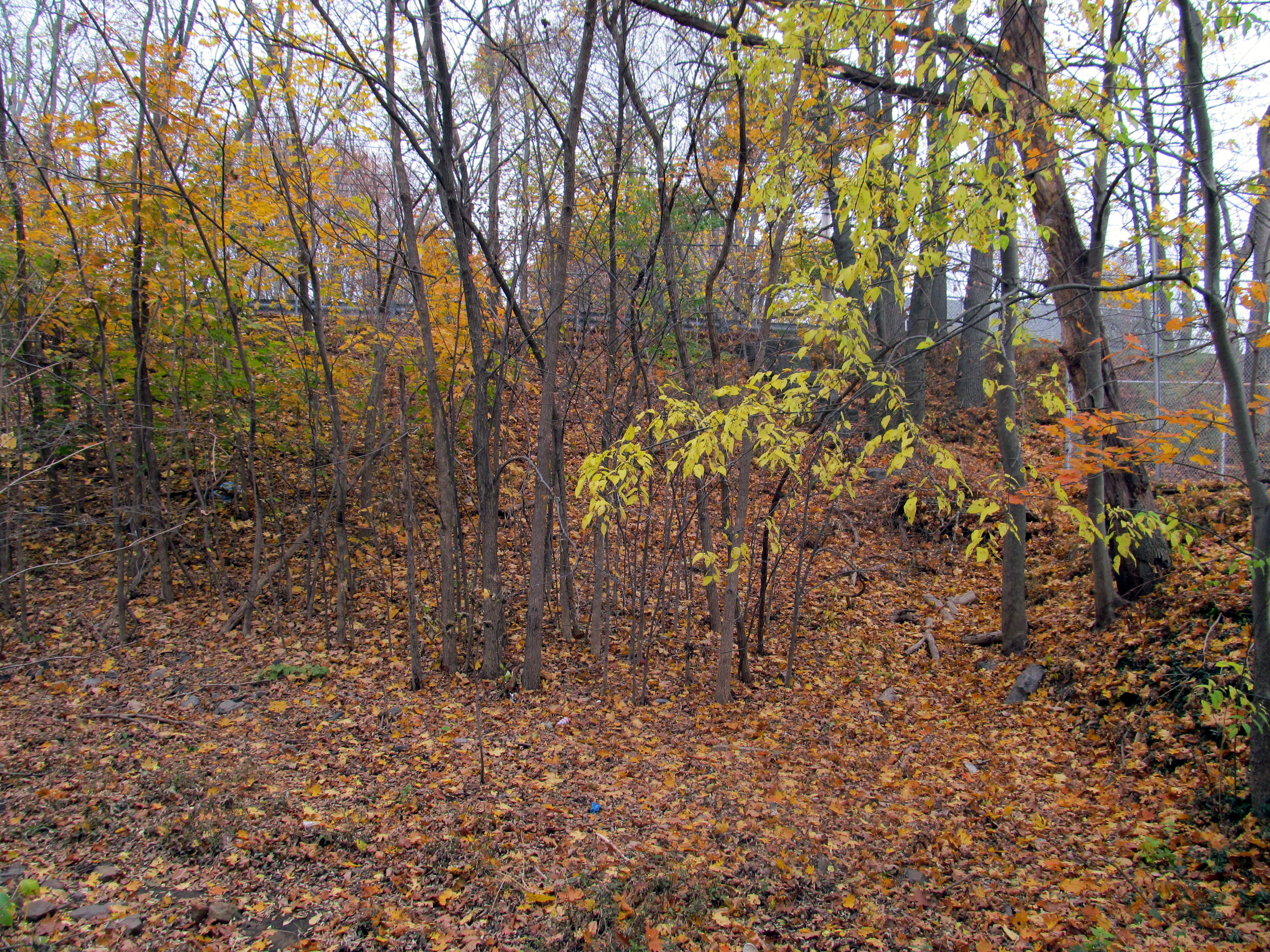
Stone Haven station site, November 2015

Stone Haven was a railroad station on the Dedham Branch spur, connecting Dedham station to the main Boston-Providence line at Readville. The station was located on Mount Vernon Street in Dedham, next to the home of Col. Eliphalet Stone, and was named for him. Stone donated the building for the waiting room.

Coal was delivered to this station to then be transported to the mills along the nearby Mother Brook.

The station closed on April 21, 1967.

== See also ==
- History of rail in Dedham, Massachusetts

== Works cited ==
- Neiswander, Judith (2024). Mother Brook and the Mills of East Dedham. Damianos Publishing. ISBN 978-1-941573-66-2.
