= History of rail in Dedham, Massachusetts =

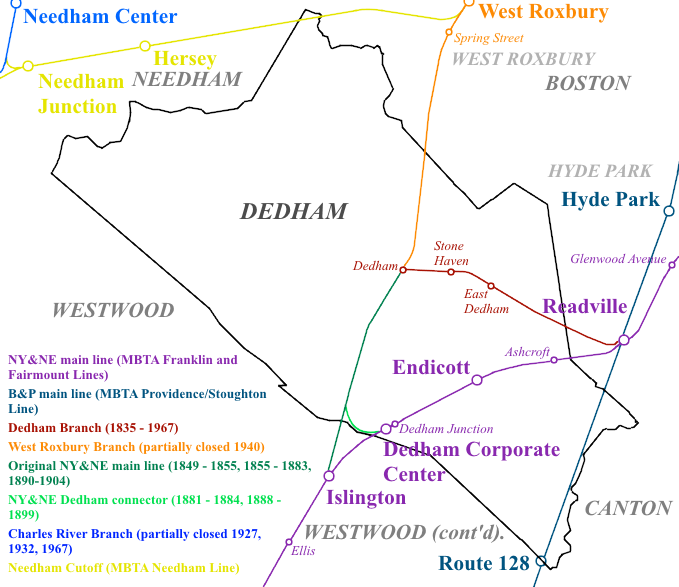
A map of the current (large circles) and former (small circles) train stations in and around Dedham.

The history of rail in Dedham, Massachusetts begins with the introduction of the first rail line in 1836 and runs to the present day. Multiple railroads have serviced Dedham since then, and current service is provided by the MBTA. The station in Dedham Square built in 1881 out of Dedham Granite was demolished in 1951 and the stones were used to put an addition on the Town's library. There are two active stations today, and multiple others in close proximity.

== Dedham Branch service to Dedham Square ==
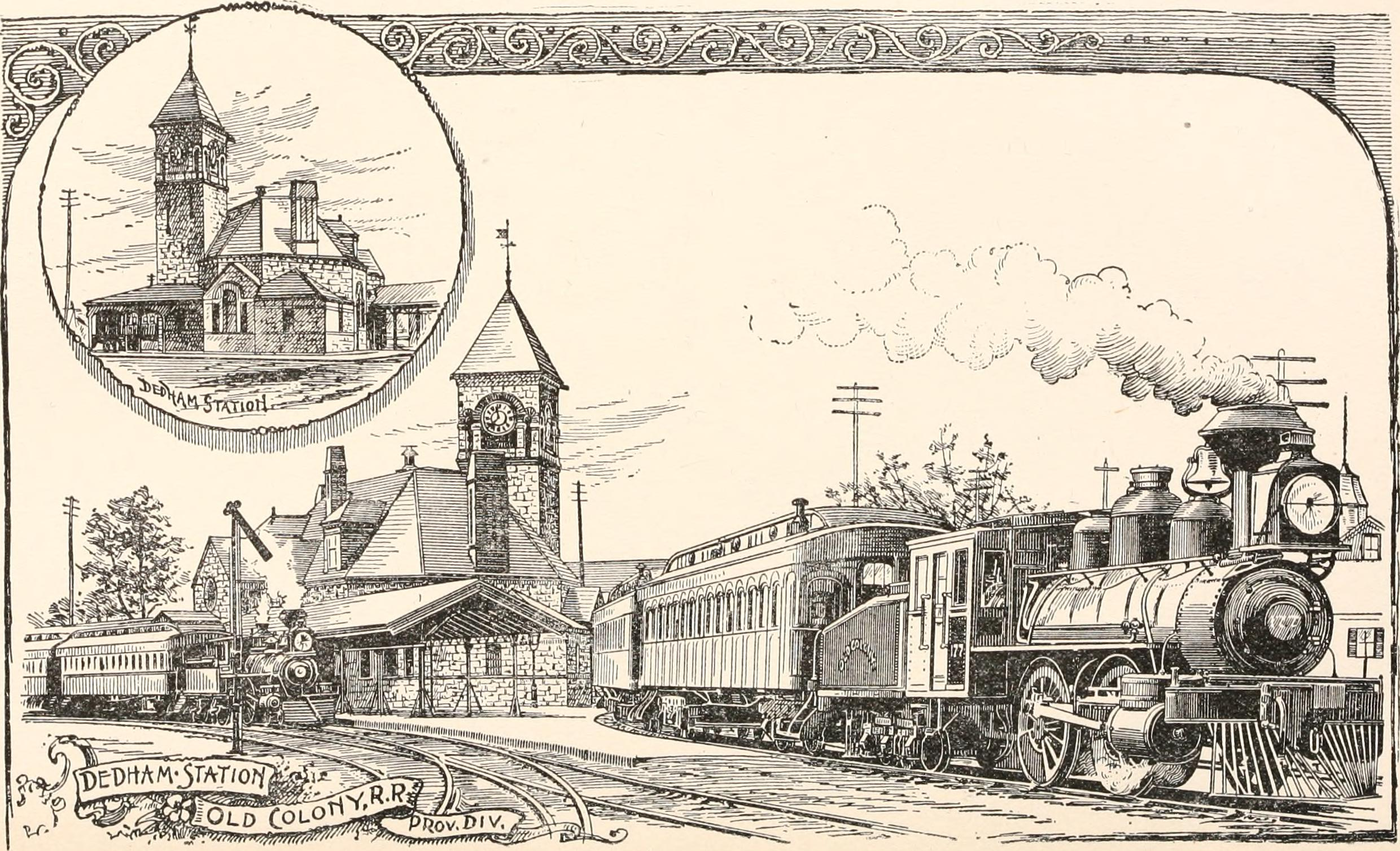
Dedham station was located in Dedham Square, in an area now occupied by a parking lot.

=== History ===
When Norfolk County was formed in 1793, Dedham was named as the shire town, and "an influx of lawyers, politicians, and people on county business forced the town to abandon its traditional insularity and its habitual distrust of newcomers." Turnpikes, including those linking Boston and Providence and Dedham and Hartford, were laid through town during the first few years of the 19th century. Inns and taverns sprung up along the new roads as more than 600 coaches would pass through Dedham each day on their way to Boston or Providence.

Within a few decades of the turnpikes' arrival, railroad beds were laid through Dedham. The railroad was at first "considered dangerous. It was new fangled. People didn't trust it, so they wouldn't ride it. Only a very few brave souls in those opening years" ever boarded one. This fear was short lived, however, as the first rail line came in 1836, and, by 1842, locomotives had put the stagecoach lines out of business.

The first commuter rail service in the Boston area opened in 1839 as a branch connecting Dedham station to the main Boston-Providence line at Readville. It consisted of a single coach that connected to the main line train and made stops at Stone Haven, East Dedham, (Note: The station was originally known as Walnut Hill station.) and Oakdale (Note: Later known as Ashcroft station.) stations. All stations on this line would eventually close on April 21, 1967.

=== Boston and Providence Railroad ===
The Boston and Providence Railroad was chartered in 1831, following several years of inquiries and route surveys. The original route had it going through Dedham, but, when construction began, residents were dismayed to see it laid out through nearby Canton instead. It was soon discovered that the only two members of the board of directors who lived in New England were from Canton.

The two head engineers for the project, George Washington Whistler and William Gibbs McNeil, were living in Fisher Ames' old home at the time. Residents approached them and asked them to act as intermediaries with the railroad. Though the directors were not pleased, they did come to a compromise, in that, if Dedham could supply the land for the tracks, the railroad would lay them. A collection was taken, and, within three days, the proponents had enough money to buy the land that had not simply been donated free of charge.

Construction began very shortly thereafter. The railroad experienced minor difficulties in laying the track. There were about 250 feet of ledge behind what is today Dedham High School, and a swamp near present-day Cecil Place. When workers arrived at the swamp one morning, they discovered that all the grading work they had previously done was ruined when the wall holding back Pliny Bingham's swamp gave way overnight and submerged the railbed. The land was filled in, the track was laid, and the project was complete by the first week of December in 1834.

The opening of the line was marked by the English locomotive Whistler drawing a carload of VIPs to Dedham. When it reached a hill at Dedham's Low Plain, however, the engine could not make it up the grade. As a result, the entire car of people was forced to disembark and walk the rest of the way to Bride's Tavern.

For the first year of operation, horses dragged the cars along the tracks to Readville, at which point the cars were hitched to trains en route to Boston from Providence. The pony-drawn engines, which were attached to the tenders, were named the Dedhamand the Roxbury. In 1837, steam locomotives replaced the carriages. Dedham station burned down in 1837, destroying a great deal of rolling stock in the process, and necessitating a temporary return to horses. A second fire occurred in 1849, leaving only the walls standing, and the station was patched up with boards for temporary use until a new station could be constructed to the south.

There were two trains regularly in use on the branch, the Norfolk and the Suffolk. The branch would also occasionally be serviced by the Tiot or the King Phillip. (Note: The Algonquians living in the area around Dedham prior to the colonists' arrival called the place Tiot, which means "land surrounded by water." Tiot was later used to describe the village of South Dedham, today the separate town of Norwood.) The engines serving the Dedham Branch were made by G.S. Griggs and the Norfolk County engines by Taunton Locomotive Works. The trains were powered by burning wood that was sawed by horsepower in a building adjoining the Dedham station. The smoke was so thick and profuse that it spread throughout the vicinity. Trains would announce their impending arrival by blowing a long horn blast as they crossed over Mother Brook.

In 1881, the Boston and Providence Railroad built a station in Dedham Square out of Dedham Granite. The station served more than 60 trains a day in its heyday, but it was demolished in 1951 and the stones were used to build the main branch of the Dedham Public Library. In 1886, the railroad built a new bridge over High Street, and placed a granite plaque there to commemorate both the new bridge and the 250th anniversary of the town's incorporation. The plaque was removed sometime thereafter, and ended up in the woods near railroad tracks in Sharon. It has since been returned to Dedham.

=== The Dedham and West Roxbury Branches ===
The Boston and Providence Railroad (B&P) had opened from downtown Boston to south of Readville on June 4, 1834, and to Canton on September 12 of that year, but initially had no branch lines. It did, however, provide stagecoach connections for Dedham Center, starting on July 28, 1834. Direct train service between Boston and Dedham Center began on February 5, 1835, with the opening of the first railroad branch line service from Readville to Dedham Center.

For the first several years of the Dedham Branch's existence, service to Dedham changed often between "Dedham Specials" (through trains from Boston to Dedham and vice versa, using the Boston and Providence main line and the Dedham Branch between Readville and Dedham) and horse-drawn cars cut out of mainline trains at Readville. Dedham Specials became permanent in June 1842, giving Dedham Center reliable direct train service to Boston, and making it possible, for the first time, to commute by train for those living in the areas served by the northern portion of the Boston and Providence Railroad.

This pattern of service persisted for the next eight years, until the West Roxbury Branch from Tollgate to Dedham via West Roxbury opened in June 1850. After this point, commuter service to Dedham ran via West Roxbury rather than Readville, although trains continued to run on the old Dedham Branch on non-commuter schedules. Commuter service to Dedham via Readville resumed in 1858, but was always lighter than commuter service via West Roxbury for as long as the latter service continued to operate. Some of these trains were horse-drawn shuttle cars to East Dedham rather than through Boston trains, and these were not entirely replaced with through Boston trains until 1875.

=== The Norfolk County / New York and New England Railroad ===
The Walpole Railroad was chartered on April 16, 1846, to build a railroad from Dedham to Walpole, but construction had not yet started when it was absorbed by the Norfolk County Railroad in July 1847. The Norfolk County, which had been chartered just three months prior to build from Walpole to Blackstone station, began passenger service between Dedham and Walpole in April 1849. Through Boston-Blackstone service via Dedham was instituted the next month.

In December 1853, the Norfolk County merged with two other railroads to form the Boston and New York Central Railroad (B&NYC). One of the two other railroads had been the Midland Railroad, chartered in May 1850 to build a new Boston entrance for the Norfolk County, branching off the original route at West Dedham. This new route opened at the beginning of 1855, replacing the original, but ran for only six and a half months before it was shut down by court order following a lawsuit against the B&NYC concerning the new route's grade crossings in Dorchester. (Note: Today, most of the former Midland Railroad's route is the MBTA's Fairmount Line; the southern segment, between Readville and West Dedham (now Islington), now forms part of the Franklin/Foxboro Line.)

Service along the original route from Dedham to Blackstone resumed on August 6, 1855, and ran until March 1857, when the entire B&NYC route from Boston to Mechanicsville, Connecticut reopened for a year under lease to the East Thompson Railroad. After the East Thompson shut down in March 1858, service from Dedham to Blackstone (as well as to Medway via the Medway Branch) resumed, being operated by trustees for the old Norfolk County. It was the only service along any of the former B&NYC lines until February 1867, when the entire B&NYC route was reopened by the Boston, Hartford and Erie Railroad (BH&E; the successor to the B&NYC).

From 1867 onwards, the track from Dedham to Islington was little used by the BH&E or its successor, the New York and New England Railroad (NY&NE), and was torn up in 1883. In 1881, the NY&NE opened a new Dedham route, branching off the NY&NE mainline at Dedham Junction in southern Dedham and running north to Dedham station. This route was unable to compete with the B&P's Dedham and West Roxbury branches, and service ended in 1884. It reopened in 1888 due to technicalities in the NY&NE's charter, but closed again in 1899. The original Norfolk County Dedham route, running between Dedham and Islington, was rebuilt by the NY&NE in 1890 to provide a Boston entry for the Old Colony Railroad's Wrentham Branch (the NY&NE rebuilt the line to prevent the Old Colony from seizing its right-of-way). Wrentham Branch trains were rerouted along the NY&NE mainline from Islington to Readville in 1899; an intermittently-operating shuttle between Dedham and Islington was run until 1904, using a self-propelled steam railcar. After this point, the two ex-NY&NE Dedham lines saw only freight service.

=== Late 19th and early 20th centuries ===
The Old Colony Railroad leased the B&P in April 1888, and was itself leased to the New York, New Haven and Hartford Railroad (NYNH&H or New Haven) in March 1893, while the NY&NE (which became the New England Railroad in September 1895) was leased to the NYNH&H in July 1898 and merged into the NYNH&H in 1908. (Note: The Old Colony was never formally merged into the NYNH&H, nor the B&P into the Old Colony.) Dedham service reached an all-time peak around the turn of the 20th century, as was the case with the entire Boston-area commuter rail system. In July 1898, Dedham was served by 36 inbound passenger trains each weekday (two-thirds of which ran via West Roxbury), including six Wrentham Branch trains, and Dedham service via Readville increased in 1901 to an all-time maximum of 17 inbound trains per weekday.

The 1906 opening of the Needham Cutoff, connecting the West Roxbury Branch to the ex-NY&NE Needham Branch, was to have a detrimental effect on Dedham service. Although Needham trains using the West Roxbury Branch did not initially make any stops on the branch (sometimes with the exception of West Roxbury itself), they began to serve local stops between West Roxbury and Forest Hills in 1912, forcing reductions in West Roxbury-Dedham service. During World War I, passenger service on all U.S. railroads was cut drastically to free up rolling stock and schedule time for military use, and the NYNH&H was no exception. The original Dedham Branch was one of the hardest-hit lines, being reduced to just ten inbound weekday trains.

Ashcroft station (Note: Previously known as Oakdale station.) was destroyed by arson on June 29, 1937. Previously, in 1905, arsonists had set it ablaze twice in two weeks.

From 1926 to 1938, Dedham service was provided by trains looping via the West Roxbury Branch outbound and the Dedham Branch inbound, or vice versa. At some point between the discontinuance of loop service in 1938 and the partial abandonment in 1940 of the West Roxbury Branch, Dedham service via Readville was discontinued entirely. Readville-Dedham service was reinstated in 1940, after the West Roxbury-Dedham section of the West Roxbury Branch was abandoned (the Forest Hills-West Roxbury segment continued to see service from Needham and West Medway Branch trains), but was massively reduced from peak levels, comprising just one Boston-Dedham and one Readville-Dedham round trip plus a second Boston-Dedham outbound train. Dedham service was further reduced in July 1959, this time to just a single Boston-Dedham round trip.

== The MBTA era ==
=== Dedham Branch ===
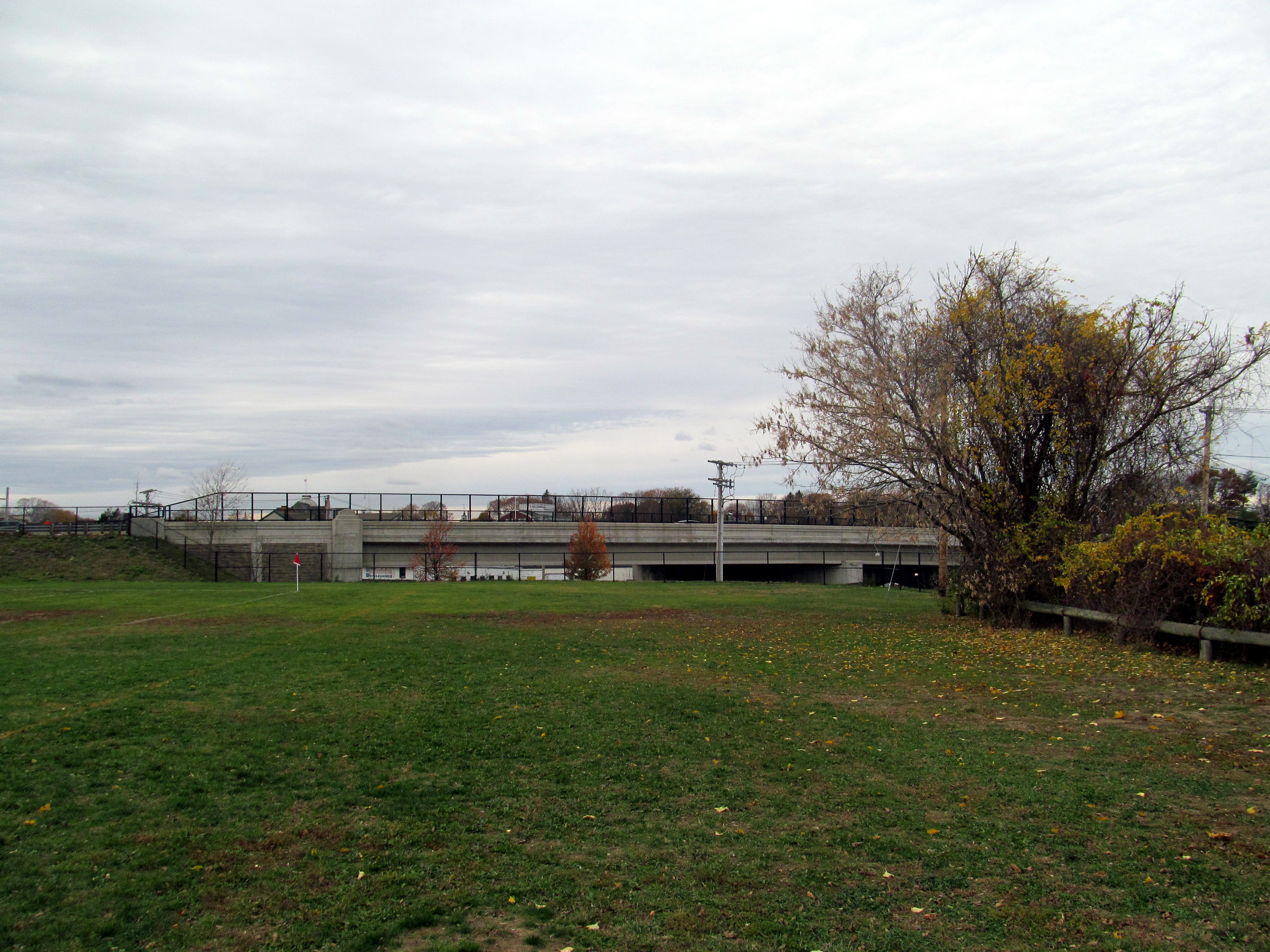
The former site of Dedham station, seen here in November 2015; the station was located just in front of the overpass at far center, while the grassy field in the foreground was the site of the Dedham rail yard.

The Massachusetts Bay Transportation Authority (MBTA) was formed in 1964 by expanding Boston's Metropolitan Transportation Authority (which was responsible for Boston-area bus, trolley, and rapid transit operations), largely in order to save Boston's collapsing commuter rail system.

In April 1966, the MBTA started paying subsidies to the NYNH&H for continued operations on four lines, including the Dedham Branch. (Note: The other three lines on which the MBTA began to subsidize continued NYNH&H service in 1966 were the Blackstone (now Franklin/Foxboro) Line and the Needham Branch, both of which still see passenger service today, as well as the West Medway Branch, which was shut down at the same time as the Dedham Branch (the Blackstone and West Medway lines were cut back to Franklin and Millis, respectively, as their termini were in towns outside the MBTA's funding district which were unwilling to foot the bill for continued service). Service on the NYNH&H's two other commuter rail lines (the Shore Line and Stoughton Branch) continued without a subsidy, as the NYNH&H did not yet have Interstate Commerce Commission permission to discontinue those trains. Passenger service on the Old Colony lines had already been discontinued by the NYNH&H in 1959; the MBTA would eventually restore commuter trains to two of those lines in 1997, and a third in 2007.) Despite this, Dedham Branch service was discontinued in April 1967, a victim of poor ridership. A pedestrian bridge over the tracks was constructed in 1967 when Dedham High School was expanded and new athletic facilities were built on the other side of the tracks.

The NYNH&H was absorbed by Penn Central at the end of 1968. Penn Central went bankrupt less than two years later, in June 1970. To prevent the possible loss of control over rights-of-way used by (or possibly seeing future use by) its commuter rail services should Penn Central undergo liquidation, the MBTA bought a large quantity of Penn Central rights-of-way in January 1973, including both of the original B&P Dedham routes; the Dedham Branch was still intact at this point, while the Dedham segment of the West Roxbury Branch had been completely abandoned, having been reduced to an empty right-of-way.

=== Franklin/Foxboro Line ===
The Franklin/Foxboro Line (the NY&NE's main line for much of its existence) passes through southeastern Dedham, and, although it passes much further from the center of town than the Dedham Branch did, still serves a considerable portion of Dedham. On the segment of the Franklin/Foxboro Line located within Dedham, stations have existed at four locations: Dedham Corporate Center (signed as Dedham Corporate Center/128; a previous station, Rustcraft, had also existed at this location), Dedham Junction just to the east, Endicott, and Ashcroft. Of these four, only Dedham Corporate Center and Endicott are currently active. Just to the south in Westwood is Islington (also currently active), while Ellis station formerly stood further to the south, in far northern Norwood.

==== Dedham Junction and Dedham Corporate Center ====
===== Dedham Junction =====
The Norfolk County Railroad completed their Midland Division from Islington to Boston in January 1855. No station was originally located at the modern location, which was in the middle of a swamp until the middle of the 20th century. The line passed through several operators and finally to the New York and New England Railroad in 1875.

In 1881, the NY&NE built a branch from Dedham Junction (near the modern station site) to Dedham to replace the Norfolk County's original route to Dedham. This allowed the railroad to (unsuccessfully) compete with the Boston and Providence Railroad's Dedham Loop for Boston-Dedham commuter traffic. The branch was closed in 1884, but reopened in 1888 by state commission order. In 1890 a short leg allowing Dedham-Islington travel for the Old Colony Railroad's Wrentham Branch was opened; trains using this route skipped Dedham Junction station. By 1898, the NYNH&H had acquired the Old Colony, NY&NE, and the Boston & Providence. With the NYNH&H having no need for four routes to the small town of Dedham, the southern branch was soon abandoned. Service south of Dedham via Dedham Junction ended in 1899 and via Islington in 1904.

===== Rust Craft =====
On May 2, 1955, the NYNH&H opened Rust Craft (or Rustcraft) station off Rustcraft Road, just east of the modern station location. The station, which served the Rust Craft greeting card plant, was the first reverse commute-focused station on the MBTA system, and was "hailed as the start of a new era". Rust Craft station was closed in 1977 due to low ridership.

===== Dedham Corporate =====
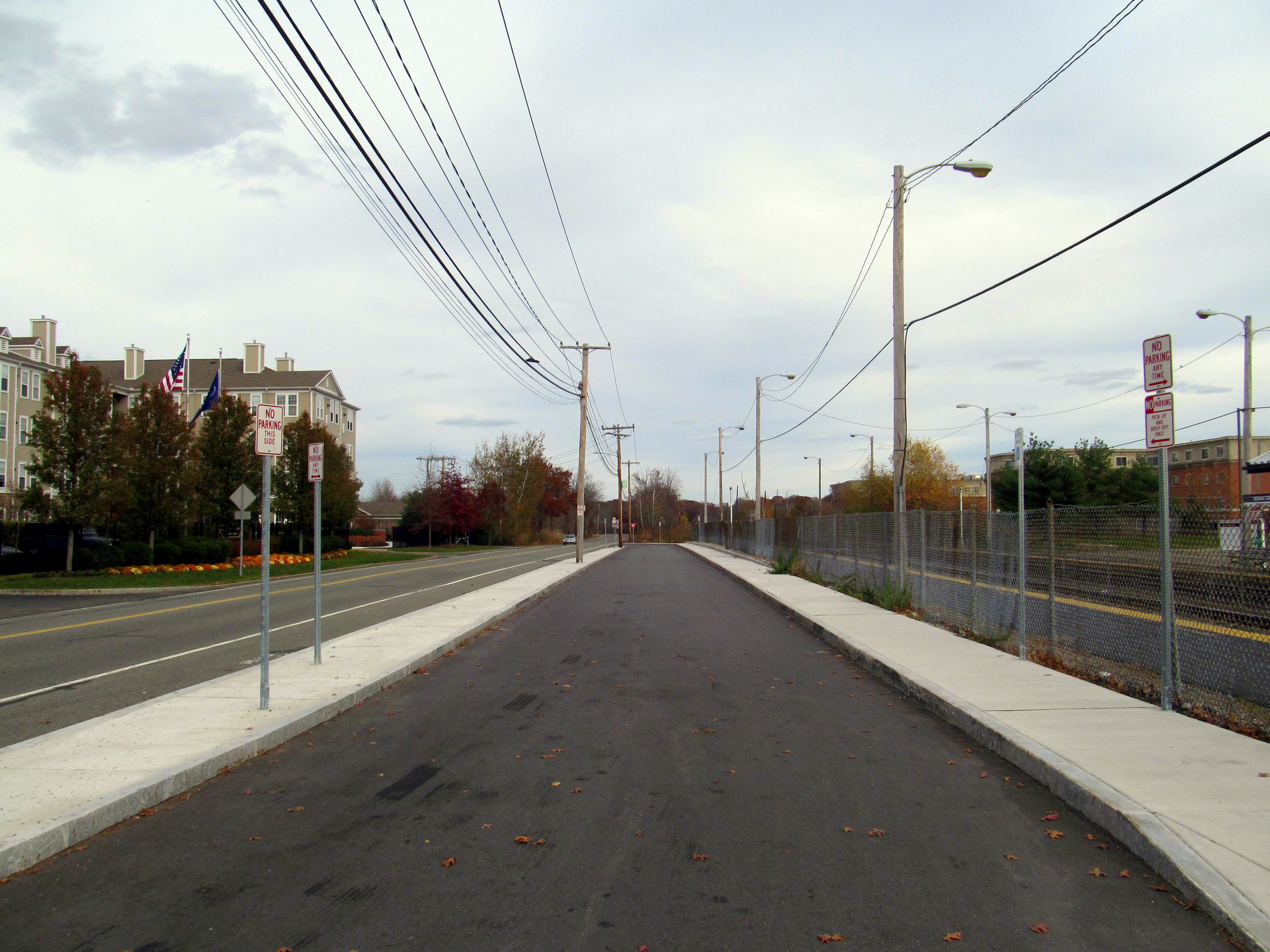
The 2014-built kiss-and-ride lane in 2015

During the 1980s, the Dedham Corporate Center office park was built nearby due to convenient access to Route 128 and Route 1. On January 15, 1990, Dedham Corporate Center station was opened just off exit 14 of Interstate 95/Route 128, near the old Dedham Junction and Rustcraft stations. As well as providing access to the office park, the station provides nearly 500 parking spaces for commuters riding to Boston, as well as access to the office park for workers coming from both directions on the line. The station consists of two platforms (each a long low asphalt platform with a short high-level platform for handicapped accessibility) serving the Franklin/Foxboro Line's two tracks. Original plans called for a much larger "transportation center" on the site, including a 1,000 car garage on Rustcraft Road, but town officials were opposed.

In late 2014, a kiss and ride dropoff lane was built on the north side of the station off Rustcraft Road. Dedham Corporate Center is the only stop between Back Bay and Foxboro on special game-day service for New England Patriots home games at Gillette Stadium.

==== Endicott ====
The Endicott station on the Franklin/Foxboro Line is located off Grant Avenue near East Street.

The Norfolk County Railroad opened its Boston Extension (the Midland Branch) from Islington to Boston on January 1, 1855, to end its dependence on the Boston and Providence Railroad for access to downtown Boston. East Street (later known as Endicott) was among the original stops on the extension. The line was closed from July 14, 1855, until late 1856 due to a lawsuit, but has been continuously open since 1867, with service via the Midland Branch until 1898, and thereafter mostly (and, at times, entirely, with the most recent such period being from 1944 until 1979) via the B&P mainline.

=== Nearby stations ===
Readville, located at the intersection of the NY&NE main line with the B&P main line (now the Providence Branch of the Providence/Stoughton Line and the Dedham Branch), is located in far southern Hyde Park, just to the east of the Dedham town line. It serves the Franklin/Foxboro Line and the Fairmount Line (the proximal portion of the former NY&NE main line), but not the Providence/Stoughton Line (Providence and Stoughton trains pass through the station, but do not stop there except during service disruptions). Also in Hyde Park are Hyde Park station, somewhat to the north, which serves primarily Providence/Stoughton Line trains, as well as, formerly, Glenwood Avenue station on what is now the Fairmount Line. South of Readville, the Providence/Stoughton Line passes through far southeastern Dedham en route to Route 128 station. Although Route 128 straddles the border between Dedham and Westwood, it is located in an unpopulated area, and mostly serves park-and-riders; however, it is the only Amtrak station located even partially in Dedham.

Although both the original Norfolk County main line and, later, the West Roxbury Branch passed through Dedham, neither had any stops in Dedham apart from Dedham Square. The old Norfolk County (later NY&NE) mainline had no stops between Islington and Dedham Center, a situation also true for the 1881-opened NY&NE Dedham branch, while the West Roxbury Branch did have one stop between Dedham and its namesake West Roxbury station—this was Spring Street, also located in West Roxbury, slightly to the south of West Roxbury station.

The only other rail line to pass through any part of Dedham was the Needham Cutoff (running from West Roxbury to a junction with the Charles River Branch), opened in 1906 and now part of the Needham Line (as well as, prior to 1967, the Millis Branch), which briefly crosses the northern tip of Dedham en route to Needham. There have only ever been two stations on the Cutoff (both of which are still active): Hersey (formerly Bird's Hill) and Needham Junction. Although neither is located on the segment of the Needham Cutoff passing through Dedham, both are quite close to northwestern Dedham; further north, though still close, is Needham Center, located on the segment of the Needham Line which was originally part of the Charles River Branch.

== Accidents ==
In 1906, a man riding between two cars fell off a train and was decapitated near the Ashcroft station. An 86-year-old man was killed when hit by a train in 1908. A 30-year-old woman suffered severe lacerations to her left leg when she got off the wrong side of the train and was struck by a train in 1994. In 1993, a 17-year-old boy was struck by a train, but he may have already been dead before the train hit him. A 13-year-old boy was killed on the tracks in 2013, and man was killed on the tracks near the Endicott station in 2017.

== Special events ==
The cornerstone of the St. Mary's Church was laid at 3:00 on October 17, 1880, by Archbishop John Williams. A crowd of between 4,000 and 5,000 people attended, and special trains were run from Boston and Norwood to accommodate all those who wished to attend. It was one of the largest gatherings in Dedham's history.

In 1999, a special "Salute to WWII Veterans" saw 2,500 veterans board trains in Dedham, and then travel to South Station where the scene of their arrival home after the war was recreated. In 2015, Black Lives Matter protesters stood in front of the train running to Foxboro for a New England Patriots game to denounce racism.

== Proposed Orange Line extension ==
Dedham is located in a densely populated inner suburb of Boston just nine and a half miles from downtown, making Dedham Square a strong candidate for rapid transit service rather than either low-frequency commuter rail service (as was the case until 1967) or no service at all (as has been the case since then). The first such proposal appeared long before commuter rail service ceased, with the 1945 Metropolitan Transit Recess Commission recommending an extension of the Main Line Elevated (now the Orange Line) from Forest Hills to Dedham via West Roxbury, with five stations (Roslindale, Bellevue, Highland, and West Roxbury).

Two years later, the 1947 Coolidge Commission Report recommended two extensions of the Main Line Elevated: one from Forest Hills to East Dedham via West Roxbury and Dedham, plus another from Forest Hills to Readville, as well as a possible westward relocation of the Main Line Elevated between Essex Street and Forest Hills (only the last of these ever came to pass, as part of the Southwest Corridor project).

== Other ==
Service to Canton and Milton was provided via the Midland Railroad in 1850. Dedham was connected to South Boston in 1854 by the New York Central Railroad and to Forrest Hills in 1848.

In 1864, Moses Boyd was the "well-known and gentlemanly" conductor of the Dedham branch of the Providence Railroad. At a party for his 25th wedding anniversary, his passengers presented him with gifts of cash that totaled between $600 and $700. In addition to the passengers from Dedham, West Roxbury, and Jamaica Plain, the President and Superintendent of the railroad attended the party at his home and presented him with a silver plate. He was the oldest conductor in the country and lived in a home he built on Spruce Street in 1856. Another conductor, A.M. Smith, lived on Wilson's Lane. (Note: Modern day Worthington Street.) Charles Hawkins also worked as a conductor on the line and Mr. Sandish and James H. Price were engineers. William Dana was the yard switchman and Ed Fuller tended the gate on Eastern Avenue.

Officer Drugan, a member of the Dedham Police Department, met the last train from Boston each night at the station. He would watch those alighting for "suspicious strangers," and then turn off the street lights.

== See also ==
- History of Dedham, Massachusetts (disambiguation)

== Works cited ==
- Hanson, Robert Brand (1976). Dedham, Massachusetts, 1635–1890. Dedham Historical Society.
- Clarke, Wm. Horatio (1903). Mid-Century Memories of Dedham. Dedham Historical Society.
- Puleo, Stephen (2010). A City So Grand. Beacon Press.
