= Clarendon Hills station (Massachusetts) =

Clarendon Hills
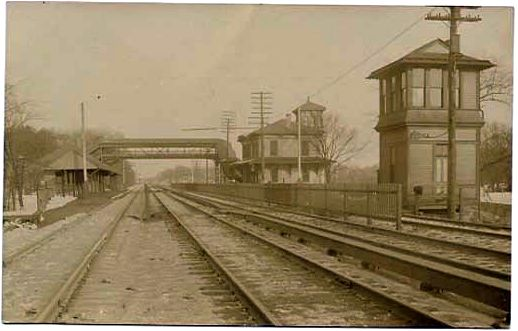
- Clarendon Hills station around 1910

General information
- Location: Metropolitan Avenue and Dale Street; Roslindale / Hyde Park, Boston, Massachusetts
- Coordinates: 42.2707°N 71.1217°W
- Line: Northeast Corridor
- Platforms: 2 side platforms

History
- Opened: c. 1840s
- Closed: c. 1930s
- Former names: Monterey, Pine Garden

Former services
Preceding station	New York, New Haven and Hartford Railroad	Following station
Hazelwood toward Dedham	Dedham Branch	Mount Hope toward Boston
Location

Clarendon Hills station was a railroad station on the Boston and Providence Railroad main line. It was located near the boundary between Roslindale and Hyde Park in Boston, Massachusetts.

== History ==
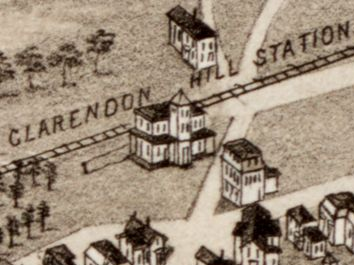
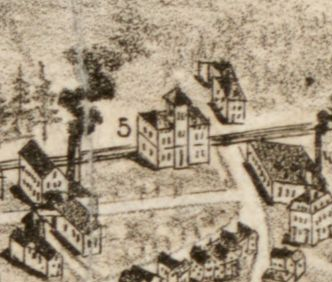
Clarendon Hills station as it appeared in 1879 (left) and 1890 (right)

The Boston and Providence Railroad commenced operations in 1834. By 1849, Monterey station was open. The station was situated in what was then part of southwest Dorchester, just south of the border with Roxbury (West Roxbury after 1851) and near the foot of a small elevation known as Mt. Monterey. In 1853, it was listed as a stop for trains traveling along the Stoughton Branch, two miles from Toll Gate (now Forest Hills) and one mile from Hyde Park station. During this period its rural location made it at times a destination for recreation seekers, such as in 1858 when it was a seasonal stop for German-American picnickers.

During the 1860s and early 1870s the name of the depot appeared variously on maps as Monterey or Pine Garden. In 1868 the area of Dorchester the station belonged to was ceded to the new Town of Hyde Park.

In 1871 the Boston and Providence Railroad completed the construction of a new station house, then under the name of Clarendon Hills. In 1888 the B&P was acquired by the Old Colony Railroad, which in turn became part of the New York, New Haven and Hartford Railroad in 1893.

In 1904 the New Haven constructed a new passenger station at Clarendon Hills as well as a pedestrian overpass connecting the inbound and outbound platforms, causing a minor controversy among local residents who preferred an underground tunnel. In 1912 the station, along with the rest of Hyde Park, was annexed into Boston.

By 1924, the station was only served by Dedham Branch local trains, with five inbound and four outbound stops daily. In 1928, the New Haven received authorization to abandon the station buildings at Clarendon Hills and nearby Hazelwood station. In the approval order, the Massachusetts Public Utilities Commission described the state of both stations as "there has been no caretaker and the doors have been locked and the windows boarded up for more than a year. Very few inbound passengers use these two stations." The station building was demolished in September–October 1929. It was no longer a stop for any trains by 1935.

A footbridge over the Northeast Corridor tracks at Metropolitan Avenue was constructed by the Massachusetts Bay Transportation Authority around 1986.
