= Pliny Bingham =

American politician

Pliny Bingham represented Dedham, Massachusetts in the Great and General Court. A swamp he owned submerged the Dedham Branch of the Boston and Providence Railroad during construction. He stole the silver from the First Church and Parish in Dedham during a dispute that split the church.

== Works cited ==
- Worthington, Erastus (1827). The history of Dedham: from the beginning of its settlement, in September 1635, to May 1827. Dutton and Wentworth.
- Hanson, Robert Brand (1976). Dedham, Massachusetts, 1635-1890. Dedham Historical Society.
