= Dorchester Branch =

The Dorchester Branch may refer to either of the following Massachusetts rail lines:

- The Fairmount Line of the MBTA Commuter Rail system
- The Ashmont branch of the MBTA rapid transit Red Line
