= Dedham station =

Former train station in Dedham, Massachusetts, US

Dedham
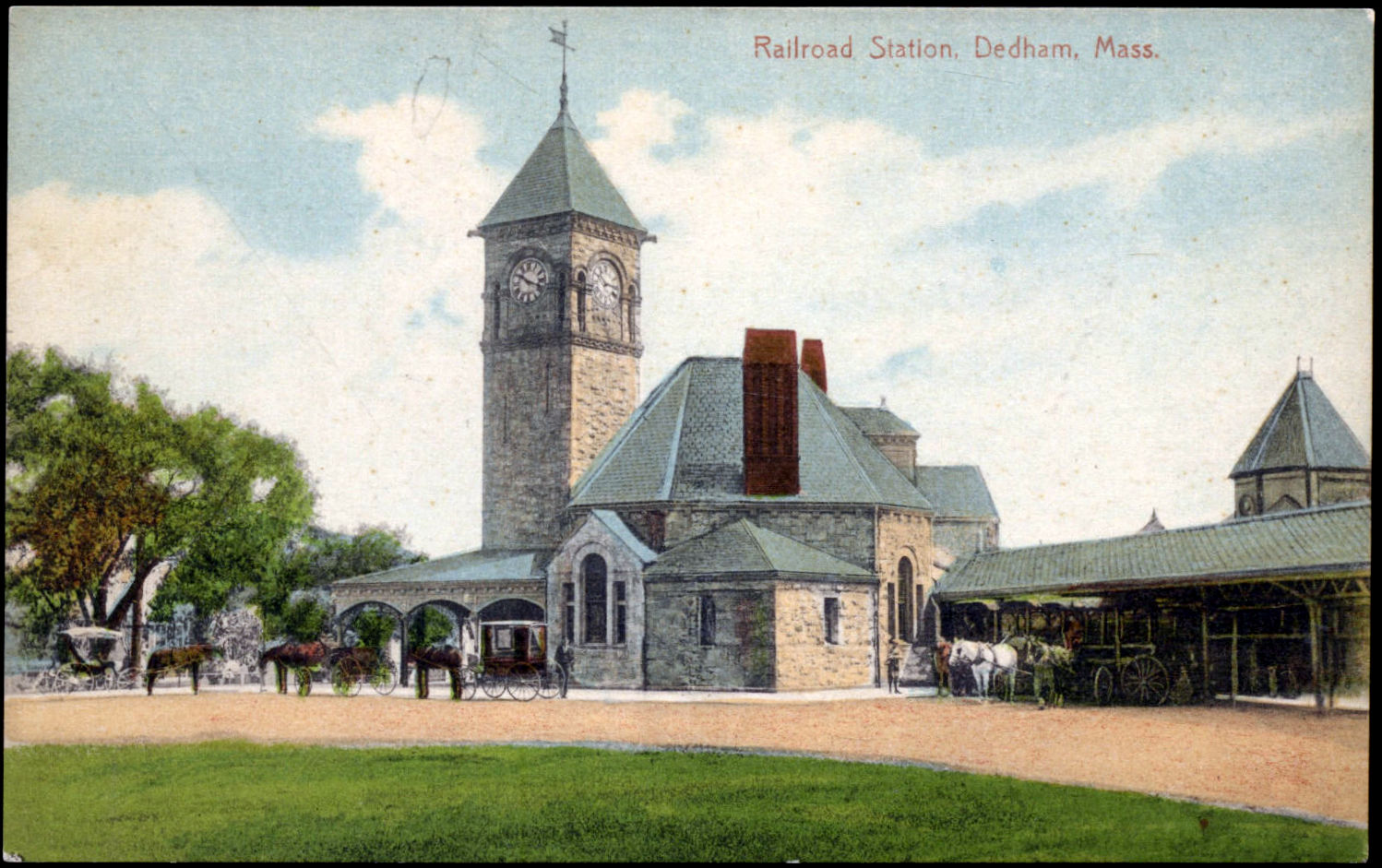
- Dedham station pictured on an early 20th century postcard

General information
- Location: Providence Highway; Dedham, Massachusetts
- Coordinates: 42°14′53.6″N 71°10′12.47″W
- Owner: New York, New Haven and Hartford Railroad later Massachusetts Bay Transportation Authority
- Lines: Dedham Branch; West Roxbury Branch; Norfolk County Railroad; Dedham Branch (Midland Railroad)

History
- Opened: February 5, 1835
- Closed: April 21, 1967
- Former names: Dedham Center

Former services
Preceding station	MBTA	Following station
Terminus	Dedham Branch	Stone Haven toward South Station
Preceding station	New York, New Haven and Hartford Railroad	Following station
Terminus	Dedham Branch	Stone Haven toward Readville
Location

Dedham station (formerly Dedham Center) was a train station located in central Dedham, Massachusetts, at the terminus of the Dedham Branch.

== History ==
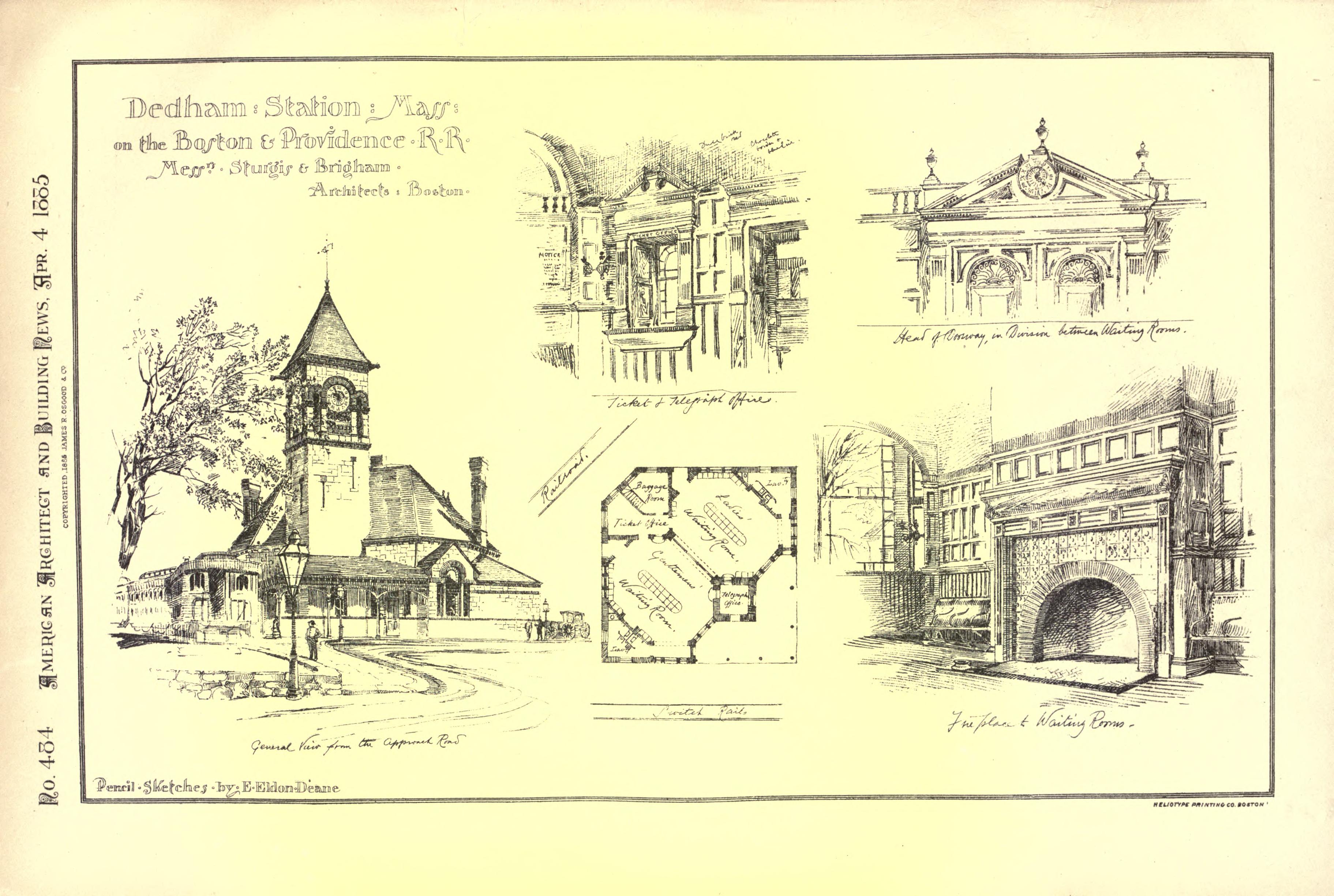
1885 sketches of the then-new station

The original Dedham station stood near the intersection of Eastern Avenue and High Streets. It opened in February 1835 with the rest of the Dedham Branch. The depot bell was mounted on a tall post at the northeast corner on a projecting gooseneck arm. It was rung 10 minutes before a train was to leave, then again five minutes before, and for a final time at the train's departure. It burned down in 1849, leaving only the walls standing, and it was patched up with boards for temporary use until a new station could be constructed to the south.

A new stone station was built in 1881–1882. It opened in August 1882. The station had a long colonnade of arches facing Eastern Avenue and a bell tower. A red covered bridge would rumble as trains would pass through it.

The building was abandoned by 1941, though a smaller station was built directly behind it. (Note: The smaller station was built where Gonzales Field stood in 2025.) After April 1966, Dedham station, along with the rest of the Dedham Branch, was part of the MBTA Commuter Rail system; however, it closed just under a year later, putting an end to 132 years of uninterrupted train service to Dedham Square.

== See also ==
- History of rail in Dedham, Massachusetts

== Works cited ==
- Clarke, Wm. Horatio (1903). Mid-Century Memories of Dedham. Dedham Historical Society.
