= Dedham Branch =

Railroad branch in Massachusetts

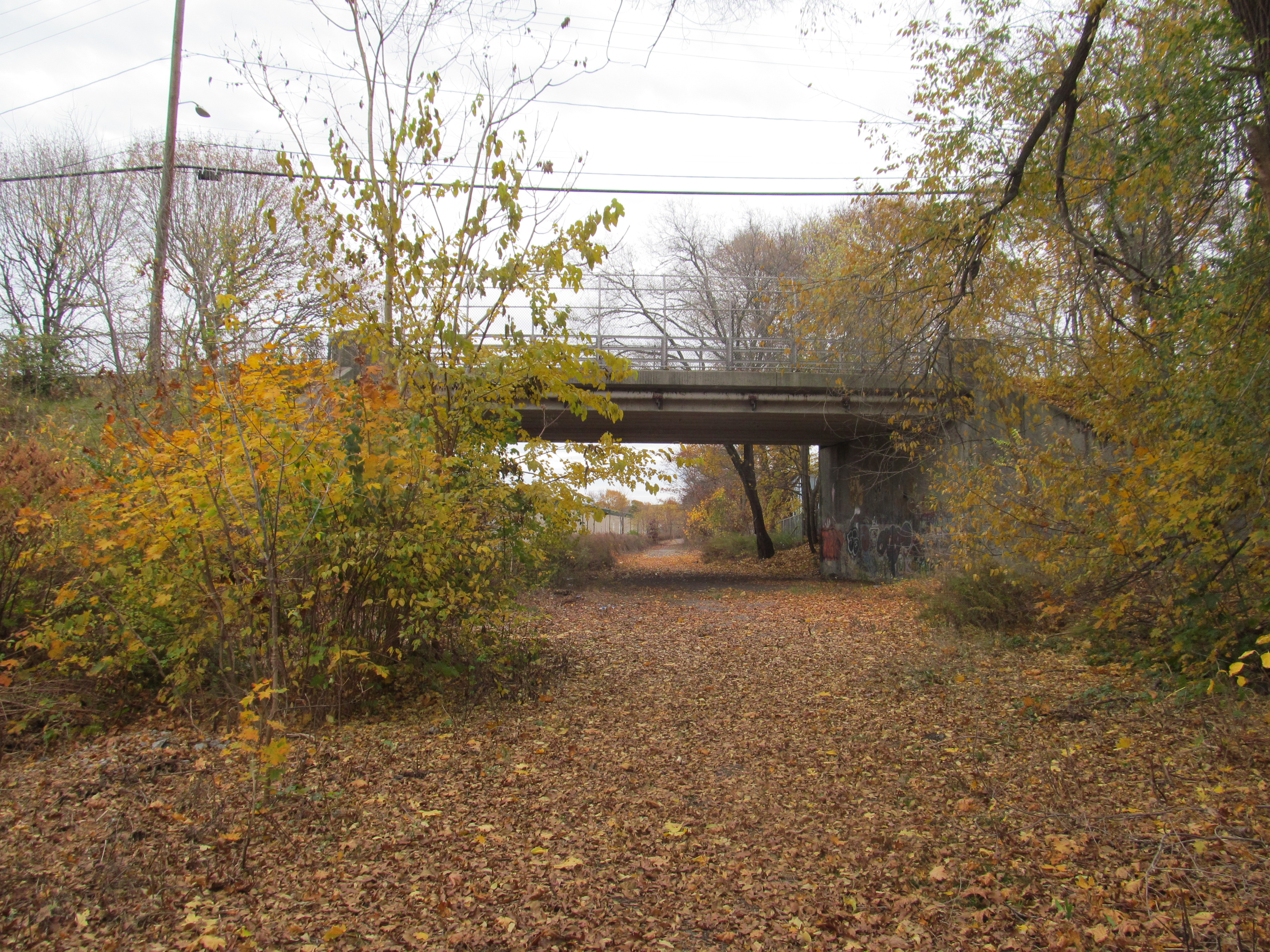
- Former site of East Dedham station, photographed in 2015

Overview
- Status: Abandoned
- Owner: New York, New Haven and Hartford Railroad later Massachusetts Bay Transportation Authority
- Locale: Southeastern Massachusetts
- Termini: Boston South Station; Dedham
- Stations: 7

Service
- Type: Commuter rail
- System: Massachusetts Bay Transportation Authority
- Operator(s): New York, New Haven and Hartford Railroad 1893-1964 Massachusetts Bay Transportation Authority 1966-1967

History
- Opened: 1835 (Boston and Providence Railroad)
- Closed: April 21, 1967

Technical
- Line length: 11.7 miles
- Character: Surface-level
- Track gauge: 4 ft 8 1/2 in (1,435 mm)

The Dedham Branch was a spur line of the Boston and Providence Railroad (later acquired by the Old Colony Railroad, and then by the New York, New Haven and Hartford Railroad), opened in 1835, which ran from the junction with the main line (now the Providence/Stoughton Line and part of the Franklin/Foxboro Line) at Readville through to central Dedham; it was the first railroad branch line in Massachusetts. In 1966, it became part of the MBTA Commuter Rail system, but was abandoned the next year.

== History ==
=== Pre-MBTA ===
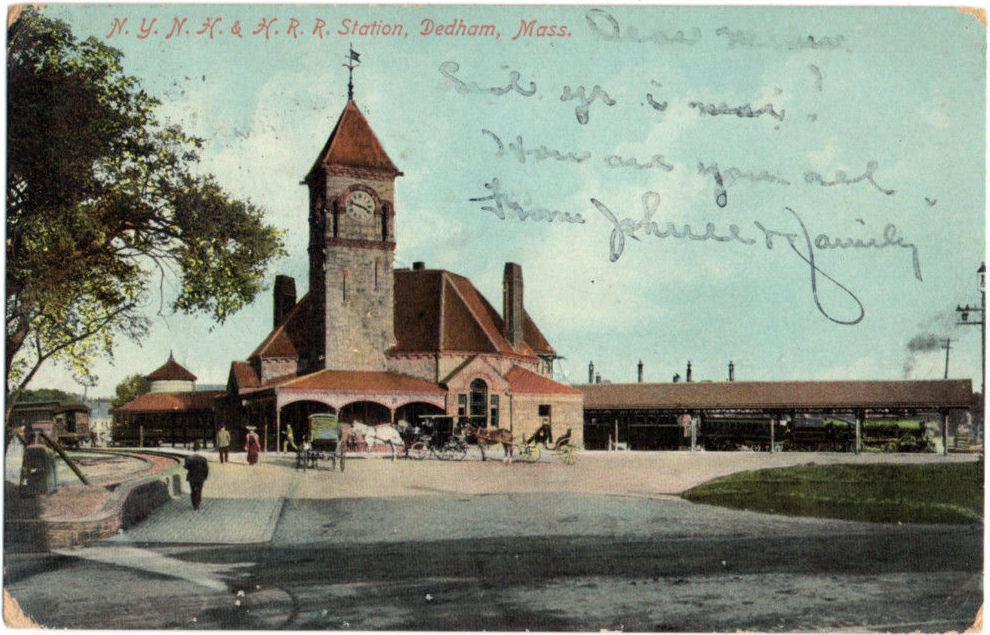
Dedham station, as shown on a 1910 postcard

The Boston and Providence Railroad (B&P) opened on June 4, 1834, from Boston to south of Readville, and from Readville to Canton (now Canton Junction) on September 12 of that year. Initially, there were no branches off the B&P main line, but, on February 5, 1835, the Dedham Branch opened from Readville to Dedham (the first railroad branch line in Massachusetts); the B&P had previously provided stagecoach shuttles along this route, starting July 28, 1834. For the first seven years of the Dedham Branch's existence, service along the branch frequently switched between Boston-Dedham through trains (also known as "Dedham Specials") and horse-drawn cars cut out of Providence trains at Readville; from June 1842 onward, however, Boston-Dedham through trains were a permanent fixture of the B&P system. These trains were the first B&P trains reliably scheduled to depart Boston after 5:00 P.M., and, thus, the first B&P commuter rail service usable by those on a 9-to-5 schedule.

Starting in May 1849, Norfolk County Railroad trains ran via the Dedham Branch, using it and the B&P main line as its entry to Boston; this ended when the Boston and New York Central Railroad (the successor to the Norfolk County) opened its own route from Islington to Boston in January 1855, but resumed in August 1855 as the result of an injunction preventing the operation of the B&NYC's new Islington-Boston route, before ending again in March 1857.

In June 1850, the West Roxbury Branch opened from Tollgate station to Dedham via West Roxbury, and all B&P Boston-Dedham commuter service was shifted to this new route. Passenger service on the original Dedham Branch continued (although not scheduled for Boston commuting), but was switched to a combination of through trains and horse-drawn Readville-Dedham shuttles. Even after the resumption of Dedham commuter service via Readville in 1855, most Dedham trains still ran via West Roxbury instead of Readville, and some Readville-Dedham service still consisted of horse-drawn shuttles, which were only discontinued in 1875. In April 1888, the B&P was leased by the Old Colony Railroad, which was, in turn, leased by the New York, New Haven and Hartford Railroad (NYNH&H) in March 1893, but commuter service continued. In 1893, the River Street grade crossing was replaced with a railroad bridge.

Starting in 1926, service to Dedham was provided by trains running in a loop via the B&P mainline and Dedham Branch outbound and the West Roxbury branch inbound, or vice versa. This ended in 1938, and, at some point between then and April 1940, all service on the Dedham Branch was discontinued; however, service via the original Dedham Branch resumed later in 1940 when the portion of the former West Roxbury Branch between West Roxbury and Dedham was abandoned (the remainder of the West Roxbury Branch continued to see service from Needham Branch and West Medway Branch trains).

=== MBTA era ===
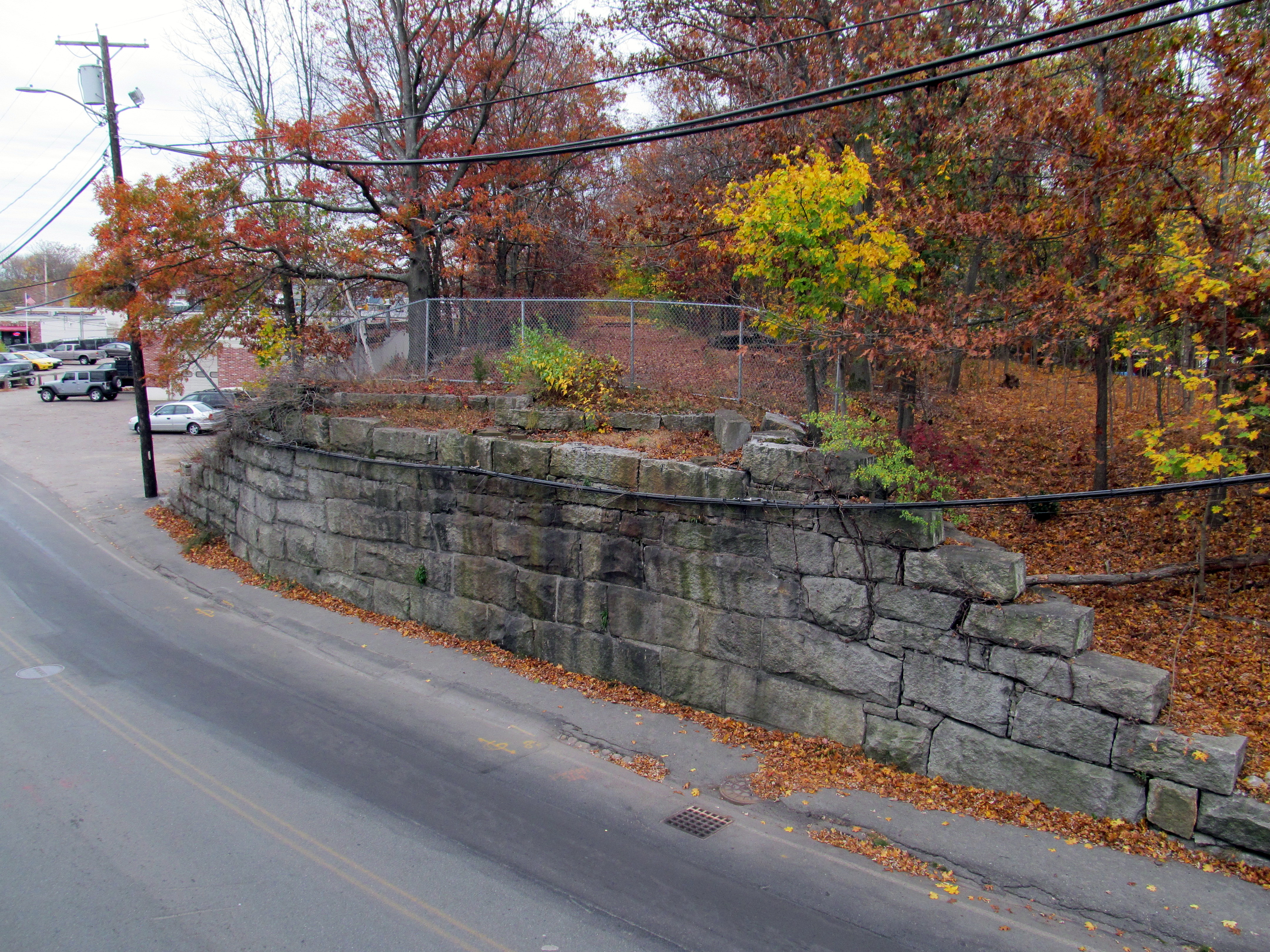
Abutment of the former bridge over River Street in Dedham, photographed in 2015

The Massachusetts Bay Transportation Authority (MBTA) was formed in 1964 out of Boston's Metropolitan Transit Authority (M.T.A.), largely in order to save the rapidly declining commuter rail lines feeding into Boston. In April 1966, the MBTA began subsidising continued NYNH&H commuter rail service on four of the NYNH&H's six commuter rail lines entering Boston from the southwest; the NYNH&H received subsidies to pay for continued service on the Franklin Line, Needham Line, Dedham Branch, and Millis Branch (the latter two each having only one daily round trip by then, service having been reduced to that level in 1959 and 1955 respectively), but not for service along the Shore Line (which provided commuter service from Boston to Providence, as well as carrying long-distance trains from New York) or Stoughton Branch, both now part of the MBTA's Providence/Stoughton Line. Despite now being subsidized by the MBTA, commuter rail service on both the Dedham and Millis Branches (by now consisting only of a single rush-hour round trip in each direction daily) was discontinued a year later, on April 21, 1967.

== Abandonment ==
In 1973, the MBTA purchased the Dedham Branch, along with several other commuter lines, following the bankruptcy of Penn Central in 1971; however, passenger services would not return to the Dedham Branch after the MBTA's acquisition. Conrail continued to serve freight customers in East Dedham on the first mile of the branch through the 1980s, while the remainder of the line was placed out of service. All rail operations on the Dedham Branch had ceased by 1991, and by the late 1990s, the MBTA had removed the remaining tracks and removed bridges including the East Street and River Street crossings.

In 1999, the Town of Dedham acquired roughly 6.3 acres of former Dedham Branch right‑of‑way including the area at Dedham Junction (where the branch formerly met the West Roxbury Branch) and was redeveloped it into a public athletic field, now known as Gonzalez Field. A major segment of the corridor between Walnut Street and Mount Vernon Street was conveyed to the Dedham School Committee in 2008 and was redeveloped as an athletic field complex and a school access road, effectively eliminating any remaining rail infrastructure in that stretch.

In 2020, approximately 2,245 feet (0.43 mi) of the former rail corridor near Industrial Drive in Readville was reconstructed as a paved shared‑use pedestrian and bicycle path as part of the Readville Yard redevelopment. In 2021, Dedham town officials proposed converting the remaining 1.3 miles (2.09 km) of the branch to a rail trail as an extension of the initial segment of the path (referred as the “Heritage Rail Trail”), which would have connected downtown Dedham to the Readville MBTA station with a continuous pedestrian trail; however, Dedham voters rejected the rail trail proposal in June 2021, precluding the right-of-way for public path conversion.

=== Current status ===
The Dedham Branch currently exists as a stub; the initial 2,000 feet (610 m) of the branch, located adjacent to the Northeast Corridor at Readville station, is used for MBTA maintenance-of-way storage, with active track ending at Industrial Drive in Readville. The line continues as a paved path (converted into an industrial access road for vehicles following the cancelation of the Heritage Rail Trail in 2021) for approximately 2,245 feet (684 m) before terminating at the Dedham border. A 1,700-foot (518 m) segment between the Dedham border and the River Street bridge abutments is the only portion of the branch that retains abandoned trackage. The remainder of the branch to Dedham Junction remains abandoned and overgrown, with a short portion of the right-of-way converted into Recreational Road, and the original Dedham station site now occupied by a municipal surface parking lot. Dedham Junction is now occupied by Gonzalez Field, with no bridge abutments remaining at the East Street crossing. There are no plans to reactivate or repurpose the Dedham Branch.

== See also ==
- History of rail in Dedham, Massachusetts
