= Readville station =

Railway station in Boston, Massachusetts, US

Readville
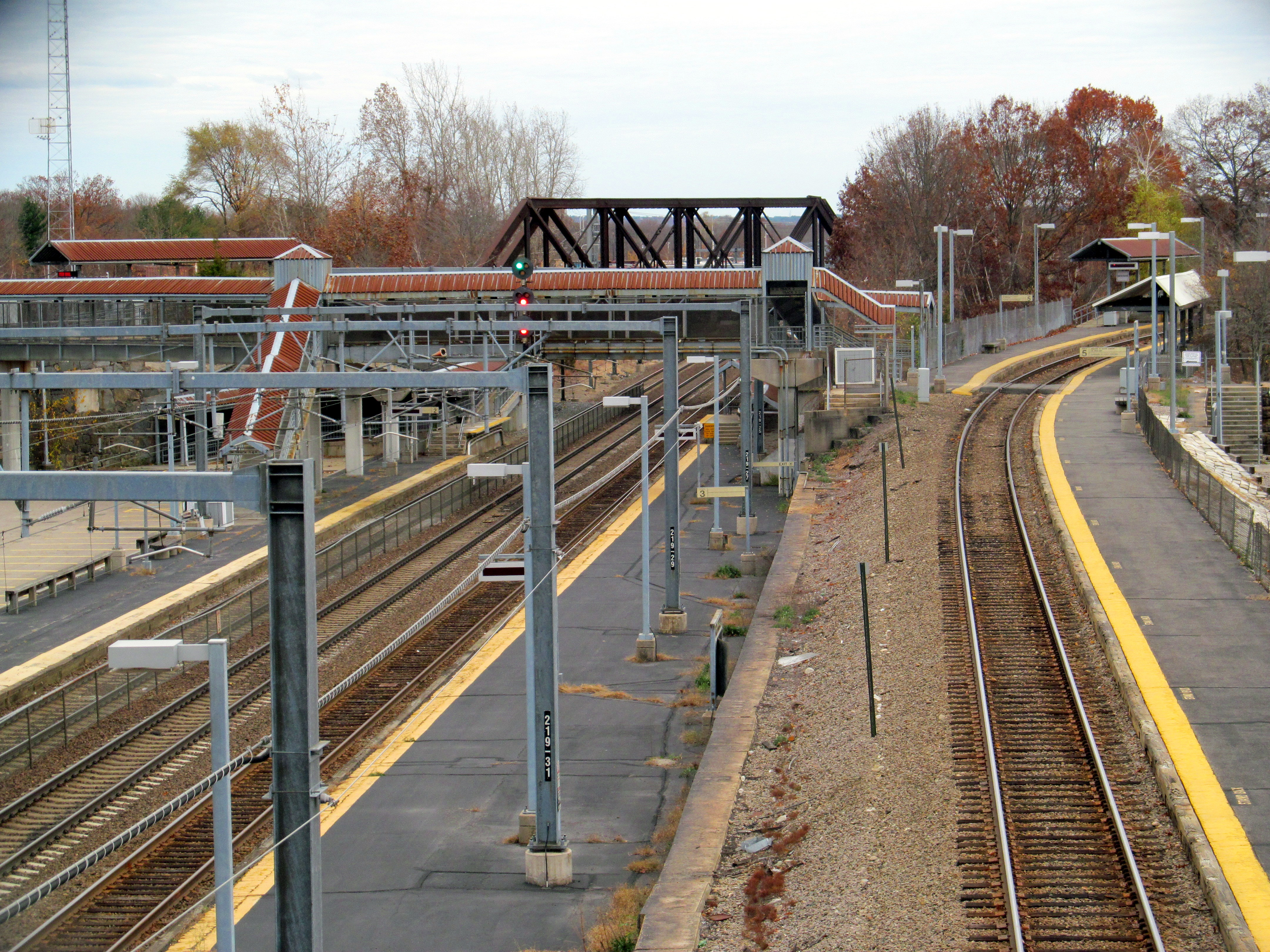
- Providence/Stoughton (left) and Franklin/Foxboro Line platforms

General information
- Location: 1800 Hyde Park Avenue; Boston, Massachusetts
- Coordinates: 42.2382°N 71.1336°W
- Lines: Attleboro Line (Northeast Corridor); Franklin Branch Dorchester Branch; Dedham Branch (former)
- Platforms: 1 side platform (Dorchester Branch); 2 side platforms (Franklin Branch); 2 side platforms (Northeast Corridor)
- Tracks: 1 each (Franklin Branch and Dorchester Branch); 3 (Northeast Corridor)
- Connections: MBTA bus: 32, 33

Construction
- Platform levels: 2
- Parking: 353 spaces
- Cycle facilities: Racks available
- Accessible: Yes

Other information
- Fare zone: 2

History
- Opened: 1834
- Rebuilt: 1898, 1992
- Former names: Dedham Low Plain (lower level); Blue Hills (upper level)

Passengers
- 2024: 826 (weekday average boardings)

Services
Preceding station	MBTA	Following station
Terminus	Fairmount Line	Fairmount toward South Station
Endicott toward Forge Park/495 or Foxboro	Franklin/Foxboro Line	Fairmount toward South Station
Endicott toward Forge Park/495 or Foxboro	Franklin/Foxboro Line	Hyde Park toward South Station
Route 128 toward Wickford Junction or Stoughton	Providence/Stoughton Line	Hyde Park toward South Station
Former services
Preceding station	MBTA	Following station
Norwood Central toward Foxboro	Foxboro event service	Back Bay (1988) toward South Station
Norwood Central toward Foxboro	Foxboro event service	South Station (1986–1987) Terminus
East Dedham toward Dedham	Dedham Branch Closed 1967	Hyde Park toward South Station
Preceding station	New York, New Haven and Hartford Railroad	Following station
Route 128 toward New Haven	Shore Line	Hyde Park toward Boston
East Dedham toward Dedham	Dedham Branch	Hyde Park toward Boston
Endicott toward Blackstone	Midland Line	Hyde Park toward Boston
Terminus	Boston–Readville via Midland Branch	Glenwood toward Boston
Track layout
- Rail yard omitted
Location

Readville station is a Massachusetts Bay Transportation Authority (MBTA) commuter rail station located in the Readville section of the Hyde Park neighborhood of Boston, Massachusetts. It is served by the MBTA Commuter Rail Fairmount, Franklin/Foxboro, and Providence/Stoughton Lines. Readville is the outer terminus for most Fairmount service, though some trips continue as Franklin/Foxboro Line trains. The station is located at a multi-level junction, with the Attleboro Line (used by the Providence/Stoughton Line and Amtrak's Northeast Corridor) tracks at ground level and the Dorchester Branch (used by the Fairmount Line) above. Franklin/Foxboro Line trains that run on the Northeast Corridor use a connecting track with a separate platform. An MBTA maintenance and storage yard and a CSX Transportation freight yard are located near the station.

Passenger service to Dedham Low Plain began in 1834 with the Boston and Providence Railroad (B&P). A branch line to Dedham was built in 1835, and the neighborhood and station were renamed Readville in 1847. The Boston and New York Central Railroad opened its Midland Branch (Dorchester Branch) through Readville in 1855, crossing over the B&P. Its station there was originally named Blue Hill, but later renamed Readville as well. Both railroads were consolidated under the New York, New Haven and Hartford Railroad in the 1890s.

The New Haven built a two-level union station at Readville as part of an 1897–98 grade separation project, then constructed its Readville Shops car repair facility just to the west in 1900–03. Dorchester Branch service ended in 1944, and Dedham Branch service in 1967 when the newly formed MBTA ended its subsidies. Dorchester Branch service returned in 1979 as a Southwest Corridor construction bypass and became permanent as the Fairmount Line in 1987. The disused station building burned in a suspicious fire in 1983. The MBTA built accessible platforms and a footbridge in 1990–92. Readville 5-Yard, the former location of the 1958-closed Readville Shops, underwent decontamination in 2011–12 for reuse to allow construction of an industrial and office development. Providence/Stoughton Line service began stopping at Readville in 2024.

== Station layout ==
Geographic schematic of Readville station

Readville station is located at the crossing of two rail lines: the north–south Northeast Corridor and the northeast-southwest Dorchester Branch (Midland Division). The three-track Northeast Corridor is at grade, with the single-track Dorchester Branch on an embankment. On the west side of the station, a single track runs from the Northeast Corridor up to the Dorchester Branch, which continues as the Franklin Branch. A single side platform is located on the north side of the Dorchester Branch east of its bridge over the Northeast Corridor. Two side platforms are located on the outside of the Northeast Corridor tracks, while the connector track has platforms on both sides. West of the connector track, two stub tracks that formerly ran to the Dedham Branch and Readville 5-Yard are used for Amtrak equipment storage.

Providence/Stoughton Line trains run on the Northeast Corridor. Fairmount Line trains run on the Dorchester Branch; most terminate at Readville. Most weekday Franklin/Foxboro Line trains use the connector track and run on the Northeast Corridor; weekend trains and some weekday trains run on the Dorchester Branch as Fairmount Line trains.

The station has entrances and parking lots at both levels off Hyde Park Avenue on the east side, and a ground-level entrance and parking lot off Milton Street on the west side. Readville station is accessible; all platforms (except one of the pair on the connector track) have a 1-car length ("mini-high") high-level platform. The platforms and east entrance are connected by a system of footbridges and accessible ramps; the west entrance is not accessible. In 2016, the MBTA considered the addition of elevators to supplement the ramps and add an accessible route to the Milton Street parking lot; however, this was not pursued. Readville station is also served by MBTA bus routes 32 and 33.

Readville station is bounded by several active and former railroad yards. East of the station on the Fairmount Line is the Readville Interim Repair Facility, an MBTA commuter rail maintenance facility and layover yard. Readville 1-Yard is an active CSX freight yard located south of the station, connecting the Dorchester Branch to the Northeast Corridor. West of the station, the former Readville 5-Yard lies south of the former Dedham Branch on both sides of the Franklin Branch. CSX freight trains operating between Walpole and Readville use the Franklin Branch and a short section of the Dorchester Branch to access Readville 1-Yard.

== History ==
=== Early stations ===
The Boston and Providence Railroad (B&P) was chartered on June 22, 1831, to build a rail line between its two namesake cities. Construction began in late 1832, and the B&P opened from Park Square, Boston to Sprague Mansion in Dedham Low Plain (just south of the modern station) on June 4, 1834. A second daily round trip and a stagecoach connection from Sprague Mansion to Dedham began on July 28. The line closed on August 25; it reopened on September 12 with an extension to Canton but only one daily round trip. The remaining section of the B&P main line from Canton to Providence opened the following year with the completion of the Canton Viaduct.

The Dedham Branch from Dedham Low Plain to Dedham – the first branch line in Massachusetts – opened on February 5, 1835, with service allowing day trips to Boston. Dedham Branch service varied between through trains to Boston, and horse-drawn cars split from Providence trains at Dedham Low Plain, for the next seven years. Dedham Specials became permanent in June 1842, allowing commuting from Dedham and Dedham Low Plain to Boston. Double track was built from Boston to Roxbury in 1839, and extended to Dedham Low Plain in 1845.

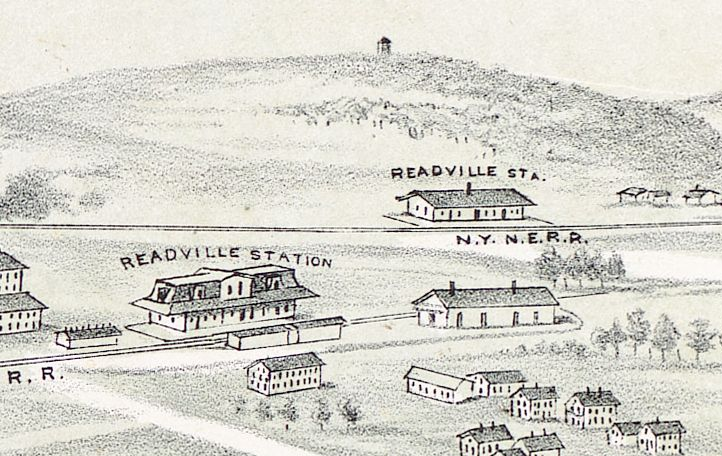
The two Readville stations on an 1893 map

The neighborhood of Dedham Low Plain was renamed Readville after mill owner James Read in 1847. Commuting from Readville was not possible for several years after the 1850 completion of the West Roxbury Branch rerouted Dedham service via West Roxbury. Commuter service from Stoughton began in 1855; it was replaced in 1858 by Dedham service via Readville, and supplemented by Providence commuter service in 1864. Readville became a short turn terminal in 1868. A new 30-by-80-foot (9.1 m × 24.4 m) one-story wooden station was built in 1873, with the old station converted to a freight house. A third track opened from Boston to Readville in 1874.

The Norfolk County Railroad opened from Blackstone to Dedham on April 23, 1849, using the B&P from Dedham to Boston. The Boston and New York Central Railroad (the 1853 successor to the Norfolk County) opened its Midland Branch (Dorchester Branch) from Islington to Boston via Readville on January 1, 1855, providing the railroad with its own entrance to Boston. The Midland Branch was intermittently operated over the next decade due to a lawsuit about grade crossings and financial issues of the parent railroad. Regular service did not resume until February 11, 1867, when it was sold to the Boston, Hartford and Erie Railroad (BH&E), which was in turn was acquired by the New York and New England Railroad (NY&NE) in 1875. The BH&E shops were located at Readville from 1867 until they burned in 1873; they were then moved to Norwood Central.

The Midland Branch crossed the B&P on a bridge; there was no track connection between the two railroads. The Midland Branch station, located on the upper level east of the B&P tracks, was originally called Blue Hills after the nearby range of hills. It was renamed Readville in the 1870s or 1880s. The station served as a short turn terminal for Midland Branch trains from 1867 to 1880 and after 1899.

=== Consolidation ===
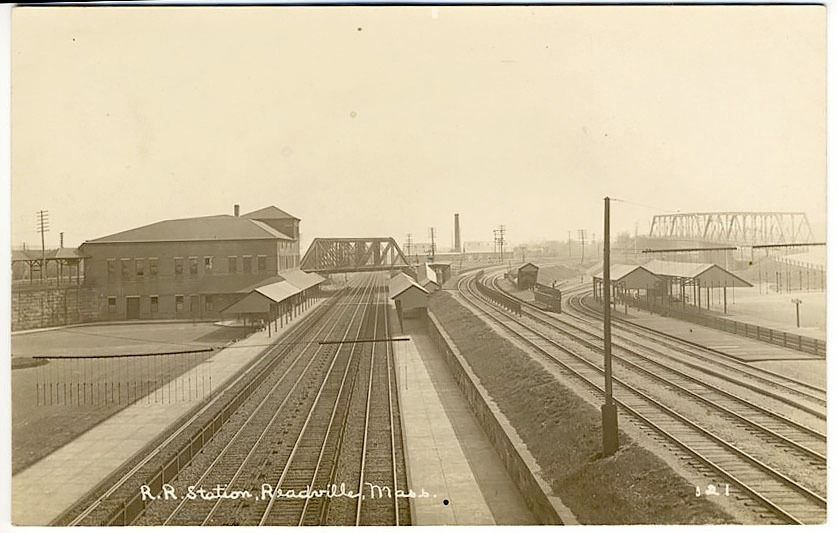
A postcard of the 1898-built station

The B&P was leased in 1888 by the Old Colony Railroad, which was in turn leased by the New York, New Haven and Hartford Railroad (New Haven) in 1893; the B&P became the Providence Division. In 1896, the New Haven eliminated Readville short turns in favor of higher-frequency service north of Forest Hills on its newly elevated mainline. The NY&NE fell under control of the New Haven in 1895, and it was leased in 1898.

On October 1, 1897, the New Haven began a $1.2 million project (equivalent to $39 million in 2024) to eliminate several grade crossings at Readville. New road bridges were built to carry Sprague Street and Milton Street over the tracks, and a new 5-track bridge for the Midland Branch over the Providence Division. A 165-foot (50 m)-wide stone arch with an 80-foot (24 m) span – the widest such bridge of that span in the country – was built to carry the Midland Branch over Hyde Park Avenue. Connecting tracks were built between the Midland Branch and the Providence Division.

A two-story triangular union station, 120 by 180 feet (37 m × 55 m), was constructed at the northeast corner of the junction. It was made of yellow brick trimmed with Fitchburg granite. An under-track passage provided access to the southbound Providence Division platform, platform on the Midland Branch connector track, and the Dedham Branch platforms. The work was completed around October 15, 1898. In September 1899, most service from the southwest on the Midland Branch was routed onto the Providence Division at Readville, allowing use of express tracks and the new Back Bay station.

In 1900, the New Haven began construction of Readville Shops, a large coach repair yard complex located in the wedge-shaped space between the Midland and Dedham lines. The shops were built to consolidate the scattered shops of the New Haven and its recent acquisitions (including the NY&NE and the Old Colony). Upon opening in 1903, Readville Shops employed as many as 3,000 workers, and could repair 200 passenger cars and 1,000 freight cars monthly. The powerhouse of the shops was designed to also power a planned electric suburban service, which was to run from Dedham to the new South Station on two routes via Readville and via West Roxbury to compete with the new Washington Street Elevated. (The electric service was not implemented; it was again proposed in 1913, but never constructed.) The addition of the shops increased residential development in Readville. A 150-by-900-foot (46 m × 274 m) locomotive shop was added to the facilities in 1907.

=== Decline ===
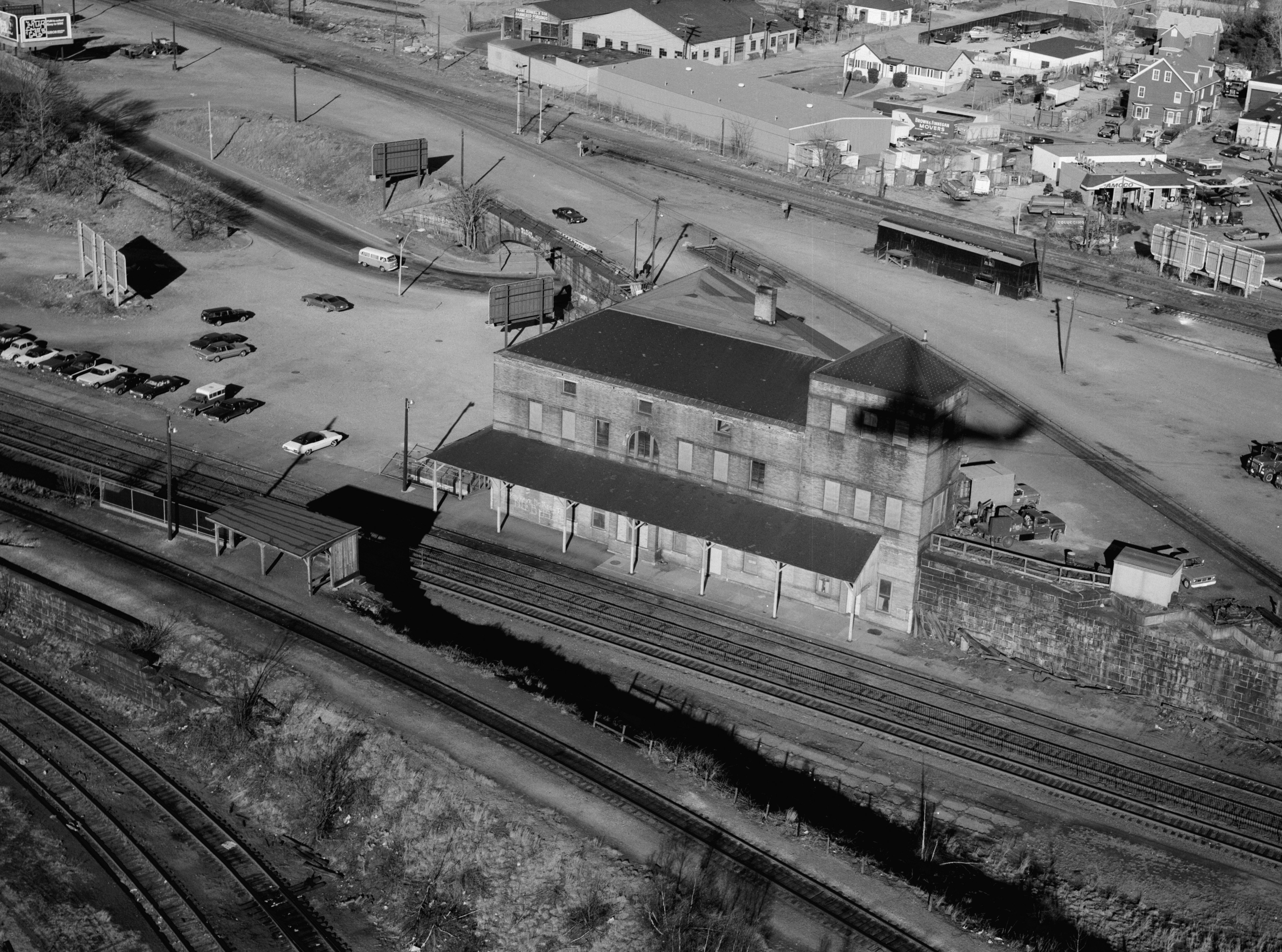
The disused station building in 1977

Rail service in the Boston area peaked in the early 20th century and began to decline after World War 1. Between 1926 and 1938, trains operated on a loop using the Dedham Branch and the West Roxbury Branch (part of which is now part of the Needham Line) – the same loop previously proposed for electrification. Readville–Boston service on the Midland Branch (four daily round trips) was discontinued on July 18, 1938, as part of the 88 stations case; it was restored in 1940, but ended again on Mar 12, 1944. Midland Branch service southwest of Readville continued, though it was cut back from Hartford to Blackstone in 1955. The Midland Branch bridge over the Providence Division, originally five parallel spans, was reduced to two spans by 1930 and one by the 1980s.

By the early 1960s, Readville was served only by peak-hour peak-direction trains on the Providence and Blackstone lines, plus the single weekday Dedham round trip. The two-story depot served the lower level (Providence Division, later Northeast Corridor) tracks, while the elevated connector track to Franklin and beyond was served by a small shack with stairs to the lower level and to the Dedham Branch track. In August 1964, the Massachusetts Bay Transportation Authority (MBTA) was formed to subsidize suburban commuter rail service; initially, only trains that the Interstate Commerce Commission has approved for discontinuance were subsidized.

On April 24, 1966, the MBTA began subsidizing some New Haven commuter service, including the Dedham and Blackstone lines (the latter cut back to Franklin that day). The lone Dedham round trip ended on April 21, 1967. The MBTA purchased most of the New Haven's former commuter lines, including the Providence, Franklin, and abandoned Dedham routes, from Penn Central on 27, 1973. Subsidies began for Canton Junction and Sharon service in June 1973, and for Providence service on 1976.

=== MBTA era ===
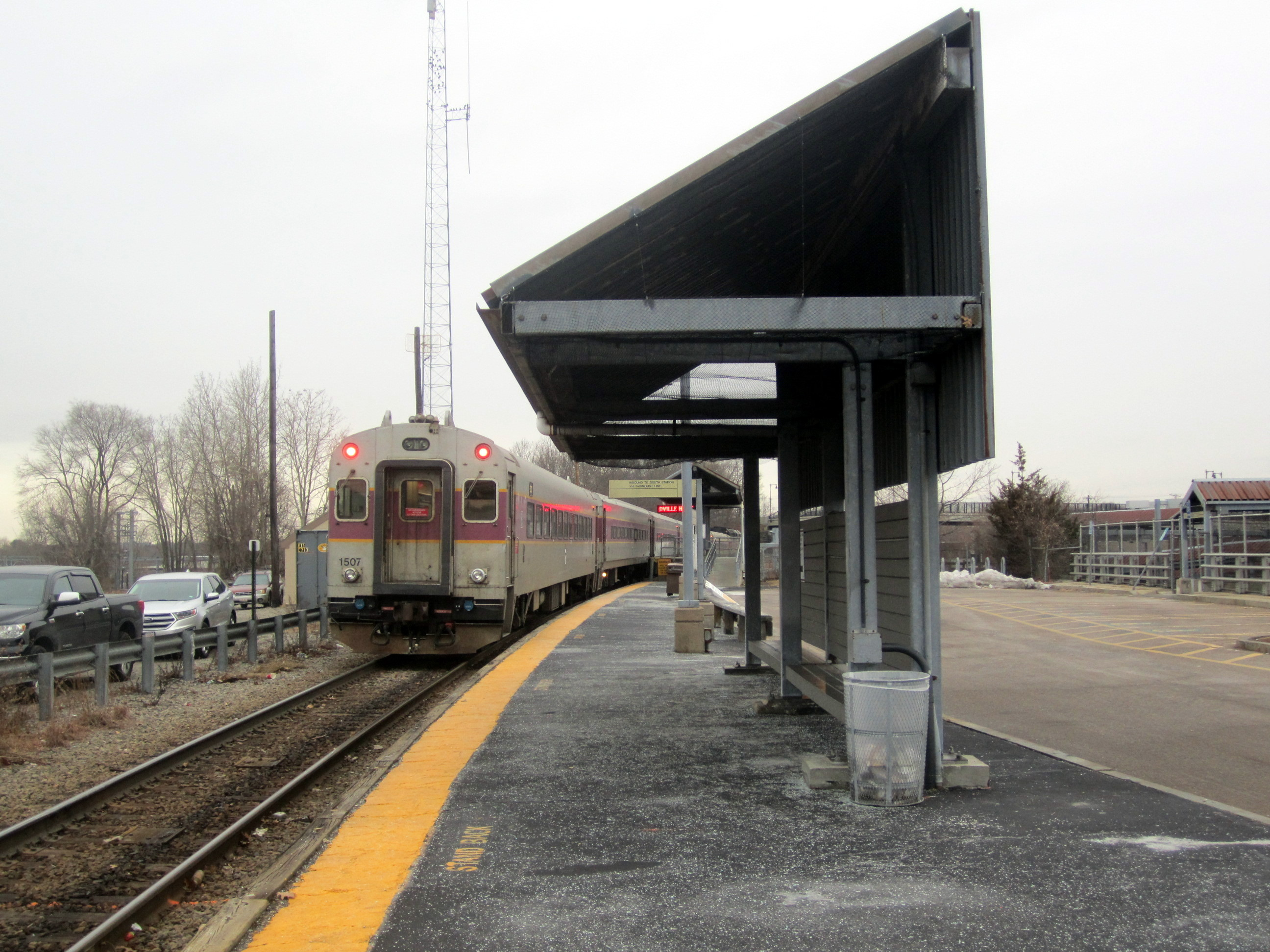
A Fairmount Line train at Readville in 2017

Construction of the Southwest Corridor necessitated closure of the main line between Back Bay and Forest Hills. The MBTA purchased the then-freight-only Midland Branch in 1976 and modernized it for passenger use. From November 3, 1979, until October 5, 1987, all Franklin Line and Providence/Stoughton Line service ran to Boston on the Midland Division via Readville. The two-story station building was destroyed by a fire on June 11, 1983. The building had been vacant since the early 1970s and was a frequent target of vandalism; the fire was judged to be of suspicious origin. From 1986 to 1988, Readville was an intermediate stop for Boston–Foxboro service for special events at Foxboro Stadium.

When Franklin and Providence/Stoughton service returned to the main line, service on the Midland had become popular enough to justify a continued shuttle service along the line from Boston to Fairmount. The Fairmount shuttle was extended to Readville on November 30, 1987, as the Fairmount Line. After the Southwest Corridor reopened, regular Providence/Stoughton Line service ran through Readville without making a station stop. Providence/Stoughton Line trains only stopped at Readville during service disruptions when Fairmount Line service was not running or when trains could not stop at Hyde Park. (Until 2004, a small number of Providence/Stoughton Line trains diverted to the Dorchester Branch at Readville without stopping at the station; such a diversion has also been used during service disruptions on the Northeast Corridor.)

The MBTA renovated the station in 1990–92. The accessible platforms and footbridges were constructed, the parking lots and platforms paved, and the pedestrian underpass filled. The 1898-built truss bridge over the Northeast Corridor, used by Fairmount Line trains laying over plus Franklin Line trains running via Fairmount, needed replacement in the 2010s. The span was replaced with a prebuilt bridge in two weekends with minimal impact to Amtrak and MBTA service on the Corridor, with the old abutments left in place as retaining walls. The design contract was awarded in 2012, and a construction contract was awarded in September 2015. The bridge was replaced in November 2016.

In May 2024, all weekend Franklin/Foxboro Line trains began operating over the Fairmount Line rather than the Northeast Corridor. All weekend Providence/Stoughton Line trains, and a limited number of weekday trains, began stopping at Readville to provide timed connections to Ruggles and Back Bay.

=== Rail yard reuse ===
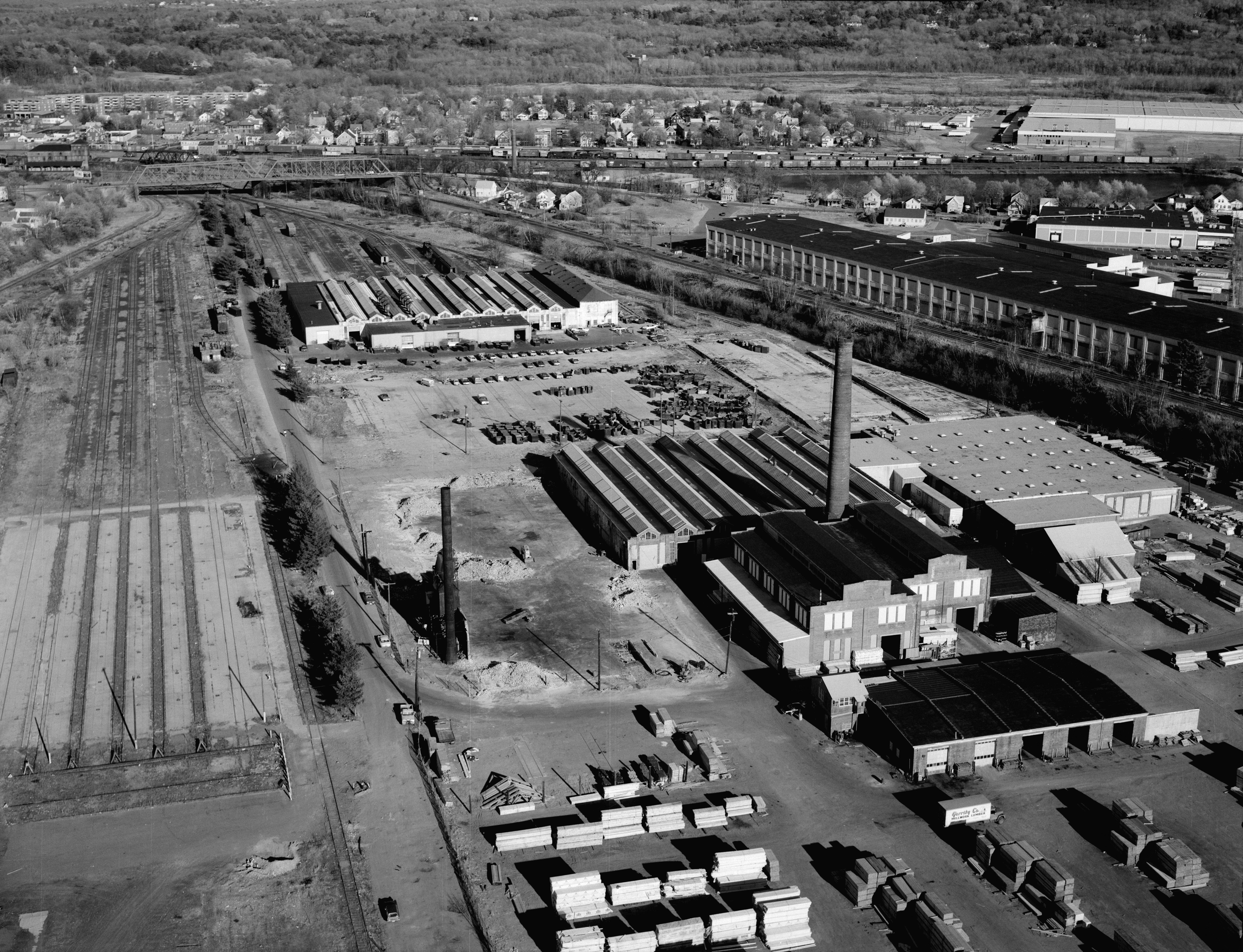
The former Readville Shops in 1977

The New Haven Railroad closed Readville Shops in 1958, with its functions moved to Cedar Hill Yard in New Haven, Connecticut. The railroad intended to create an industrial park on the 124-acre (50 ha) site. The railroad was merged into Penn Central Railroad in 1968; the property was transferred to Conrail on March 30, 1976, and to Amtrak a day later. The MBTA acquired the yard from Amtrak on November 11, 1987, and used it to store railroad-related materials. In the late 1980s, the yard was used for final assembly of new Green Line vehicles. A number of yard buildings, including the power station and several repair shops, remained extant.

1-Yard remained in use as a freight yard by the New Haven, Penn Central, Conrail, and finally CSX Transportation. The MBTA opened a track maintenance facility (Readville Interim Repair Facility) in 2-Yard in 1996, and a midday storage yard for commuter rail trains in August 1997. A 1999 proposal to expand the 12-track facility by 8-10 tracks (as Amtrak's Northend Electrification Project reduced MBTA midday storage at Southampton Street Yard) was opposed by then-mayor Thomas Menino, who lived several blocks away.

In 1989–90, while analyzing 5-Yard for potential use as a commuter rail facility, the MBTA discovered high levels of environmental contamination including lead and petroleum hydrocarbons in the soil. In October 2001, Massachusetts Attorney General Thomas F. Reilly sued the MBTA for failing to decontaminate the site. The MBTA quickly agreed to a decontamination program. Site remediation for contamination including lead, arsenic, and polycyclic aromatic hydrocarbons took place in 2011–12.

In March 2012, the MBTA announced that the contamination had been fully removed, and revealed plans to place solar panels in the west part of 5-Yard. The panels would be installed and maintained for at least 20 years by an outside contractor. Bidding began in May 2012, with the stipulation that the solar array would be operational by the spring of 2013. The contract was chosen in September 2012, with a revised completion date of October 2013. In July 2013, MassDOT (the MBTA's parent agency) announced that construction would not begin until at least 2014 due to a state solar program reaching capacity earlier than expected. By January 2015, the installation was planned for that June, but it did not occur.

Readville 5-Yard was considered for use as a midday layover yard in 2013 as part of South Station Expansion planning, but was rejected because the MBTA had committed to Boston that the site could be used for development. 1-Yard was rejected because it would interfere with CSX freight operations, while expanded use of 2-Yard was advanced for further planning. Planning began in 2014 for a five-building industrial and office development on the Boston portion of 5-Yard; construction began in 2018. In May 2021, the MBTA issued a contract for planning and preliminary engineering of an expanded 2-Yard layover facility. Construction of a southside maintenance facility at Readville is planned for 2023 to 2028, as the Grand Junction Branch will be closed for several years during the I-90 project, cutting off the southside from the MBTA Commuter Rail Maintenance Facility. A temporary layover yard will be constructed in the 1-Yard to allow construction on the existing layover site.

=== Proposed Orange Line extension ===
Readville is located in a densely populated neighborhood just nine miles from downtown Boston, making it a strong candidate for rapid transit service rather than conventional low-frequency commuter rail service. The 1945 Coolidge Commission Report recommended that an extension of the Main Line Elevated (now the Orange Line) south from Forest Hills be built to Dedham via West Roxbury rather than Hyde Park and Readville. The 1966 Program for Mass Transportation recommended a bifurcated Orange Line, with one branch to West Roxbury or Hersey and another to Readville or Route 128 via Hyde Park. Various reports over the next two decades continued to recommend various combinations of the extensions; however, due to cost, the 1987 relocation of the Orange Line to the Southwest Corridor was terminated at Forest Hills. The 2004 Program for Mass Transportation included an Orange Line extension to Route 128, with intermediate stops at Mount Hope, Hyde Park, and Readville at a cost of $342.8 million. The extension was listed as low priority due to environmental issues with crossing the wetlands south of Readville, and because the corridor already had commuter rail service.
