= Fairmount Line =

MBTA Commuter Rail line

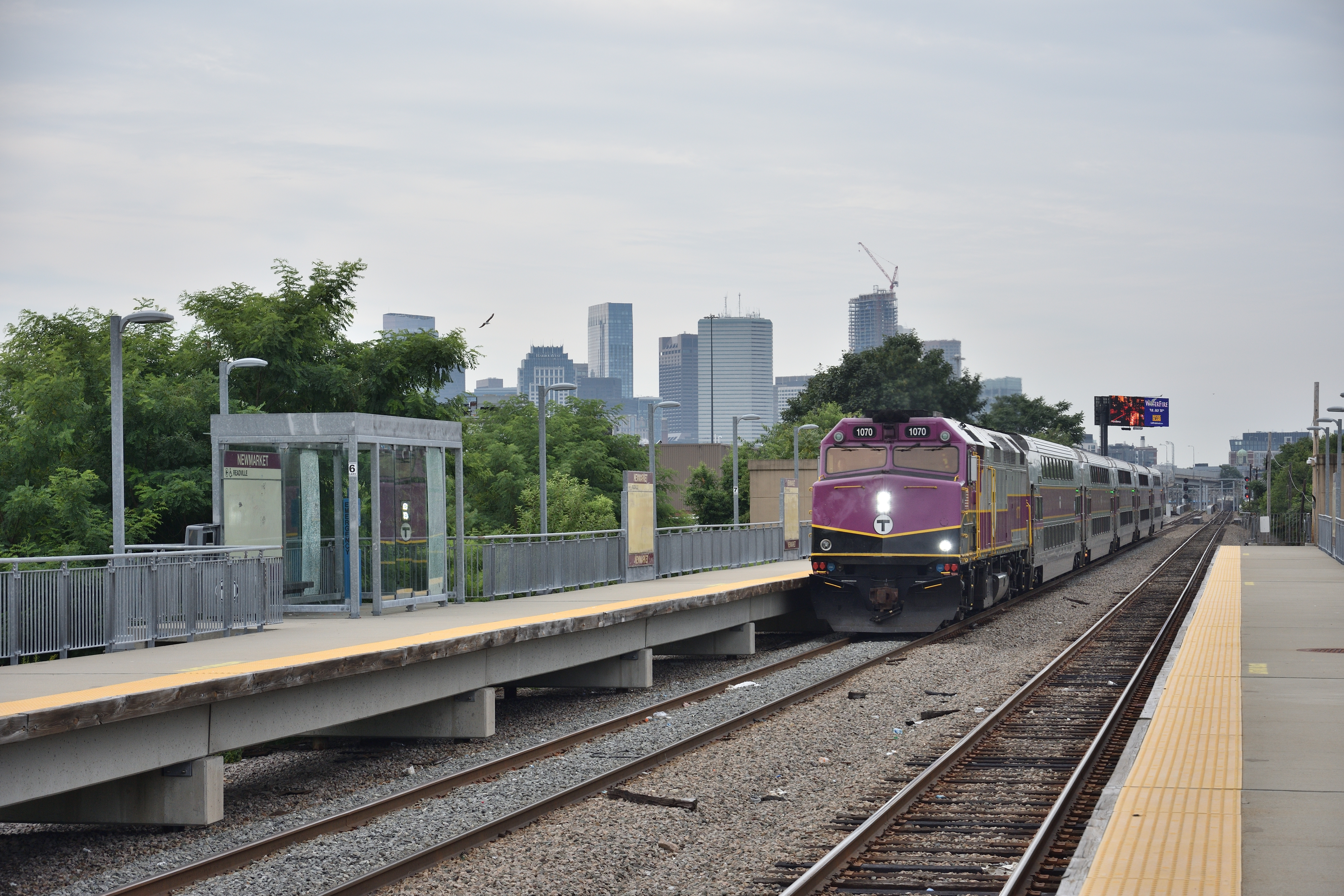
- An outbound train at Newmarket station in July 2024

Overview
- Owner: Massachusetts Bay Transportation Authority
- Locale: Greater Boston
- Termini: South Station; Readville
- Stations: 9
- Website: www.mbta.com/schedules/CR-Fairmount

Service
- Type: Commuter rail line
- System: MBTA Commuter Rail
- Train number(s): 7201-7257 (weekdays); 7701-7734 (weekends)
- Operator: Keolis North America
- Daily ridership: 4,402 (2024)

Technical
- Line length: 9.2 mi (14.8 km)
- Num of tracks: 2
- Track gauge: 4 ft 8 1/2 in (1,435 mm)

The Fairmount Line or Dorchester Branch is a line of the MBTA Commuter Rail system in Boston, Massachusetts, USA. Except for a short portion in Milton, it lies entirely within Boston, running southwest from South Station through the neighborhoods of Dorchester, Mattapan and Hyde Park. Weekend service began on November 29, 2014. Most trains reverse direction at the south end at Readville, but some Franklin/Foxboro Line trains use the Fairmount Line rather than the Northeast Corridor.

From the 1980s until 2012, the Fairmount Line had only five stations: three plus the two termini (South Station and Readville); however, three more stations were added to the line between 2012 and 2013. The first of these, Talbot Avenue, opened on November 12, 2012, followed by Newmarket and Four Corners/Geneva on July 1, 2013. Due to neighborhood opposition over its design and location, another planned station, Blue Hill Avenue, did not open until February 25, 2019. All stations on the line are fully accessible.

The corridor currently serves mostly low-income and working-class communities. Despite frequent cancellations, a June 2016 count showed that ridership had nearly tripled from 2012. While the line is still among the least-used on the MBTA Commuter Rail system, it has seen significant recent growth from 789 daily riders in 2012 to 2,652 in 2018 and 4,402 in 2024.

== History ==
=== Former service ===
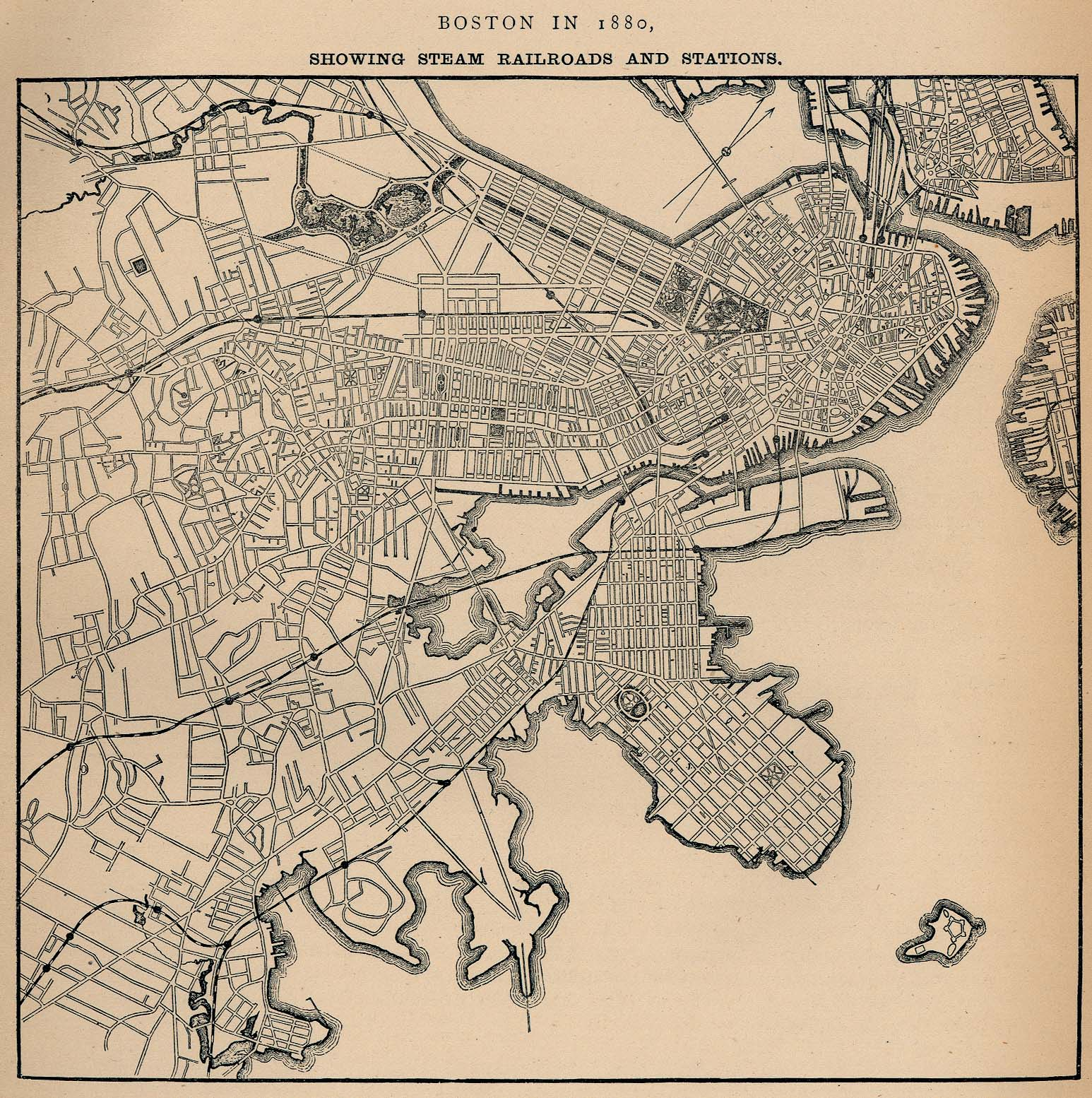
Map showing the original South Boston routing

The line was built as an entrance to Boston for the Norfolk County Railroad and its successors, which originally had to rely on a connection via the Boston and Providence Railroad (B&P) from Dedham. The new line, built in 1855, split from the old one at Islington and ran northeast, crossing the Boston and Providence Railroad at Readville. It continued on through Hyde Park and Dorchester before crossing the Old Colony Railroad at South Bay Junction. The line continued into South Boston and made a sweeping curve along a trestle west to downtown Boston and a terminal at Dewey Square.

After several failed reorganizations, the line became part of the New York and New England Railroad (NY&NE) in 1873 and the New England Railroad in 1895. The New England was leased to the New York, New Haven and Hartford Railroad (NYNH&H) in 1898 and became their Midland Division. The line was operationally split at the junction with the Boston and Providence (also leased by the NYNH&H) at Readville, with many trains using the Midland from the southwest switching to the B&P, and some on the B&P from the south switching to the Midland.

In 1899, the new South Station union station opened, and a new set of tracks was built for the Midland on the west side of the Old Colony Railroad mainline, also part of the NYNH&H. The old South Boston station (located on West 1st Street between A and B Streets) was abandoned, being north of the junction with the new alignment, and the old terminal was no longer used, with the last bit of the old line (over Fort Point Channel) removed, and the rest used for freight only. South Boston was however served by the station that had been built for the Old Colony, now between the Old Colony and Midland tracks.

Under New Haven Railroad control, most intercity and some commuter trains from the former NY&NE (now the Franklin/Foxboro Line) switched onto the Northeast Corridor mainline (former B&P) at Readville, with Midland Branch service largely limited to local trains. Passenger service last ran on the Midland north of Readville in 1944 after a long period of declining ridership, though the line continued to be used for freight service to South Boston.

=== Restoration of passenger service ===
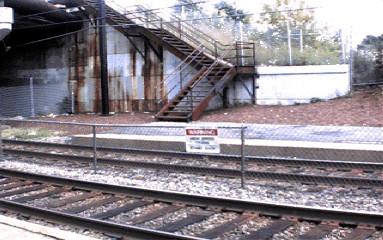
Morton Street station as built in 1979

The MBTA had bought the Franklin Line tracks south of Readville from Penn Central in 1973. In 1976, the MBTA bought the Midland line from Readville to Southampton Street. On December 7, 1976, the agency awarded a $3.7 million contract to modernize the line for use as a bypass while the Northeast Corridor was closed during the Southwest Corridor project. Three of the former stations – Fairmount, Morton Street and Uphams Corner – were rebuilt with bare asphalt platforms and opened for local commuter service. On November 3, 1979, all trains on the Franklin and Providence/Stoughton Lines, as well as Amtrak intercity service, were rerouted via the Midland. The restored service on the line was not intended to be permanent; however, it became locally popular. Uphams Corner and Morton Street stations closed on January 30, 1981, as part of system-wide cuts that also included the closure of the Woburn Branch.

On October 5, 1987, the new Southwest Corridor opened to commuter service; most Franklin Line and Attleboro/Stoughton Line service was rerouted through it. The MBTA began operating the Fairmount Shuttle (later known as the Fairmount Line) between South Station and Fairmount on the old Midland tracks as a response to community demand. The stops at Morton Street and Uphams Corner were renovated and reopened. The shuttle was extended to Readville on November 30, 1987. The route – sometimes called the Dorchester Branch by the MBTA – is used by some rush-hour Franklin/Foxboro Line trains to reduce load on the three-track Southwest Corridor and supplement the shuttle service. An MBTA study released in 2010 indicated that the most workable routing options for full-time service to Foxboro would involve extending some or all Fairmount Line trips to Foxboro over part of the Franklin Line.

Some Providence/Stoughton Line trips used the Fairmount Line tracks until around 2004, when they were rerouted to the mainline to avoid passing through CSX's Readville 1-Yard. During disruptions on the Northeast Corridor north of Readville, Franklin and Providence service is sometimes diverted over the Fairmount Line.

All grade crossings on the line were eliminated by the 1920s except Bird Street in Dorchester. After a quarter-century of debate, plans to replace it with a road bridge at Cedar Place were cancelled in 1941 due to a steel shortage. The crossing was finally closed in the late 1970s in preparation for passenger service; a footbridge was built to replace it. Although well-trafficked, the bridge deteriorated due to lack of maintenance and became unsafe; lighting was not replaced after persistent vandalism, and robberies were common. Residents filed a petition with the MBTA in 2010, but no actions were taken until the MBTA closed the bridge outright in March 2014 due to its condition. The City of Boston and the MBTA each claimed the other was responsible for maintaining and funding a replacement bridge, and the bridge was demolished around 2018 without replacement.

=== Improvement project ===
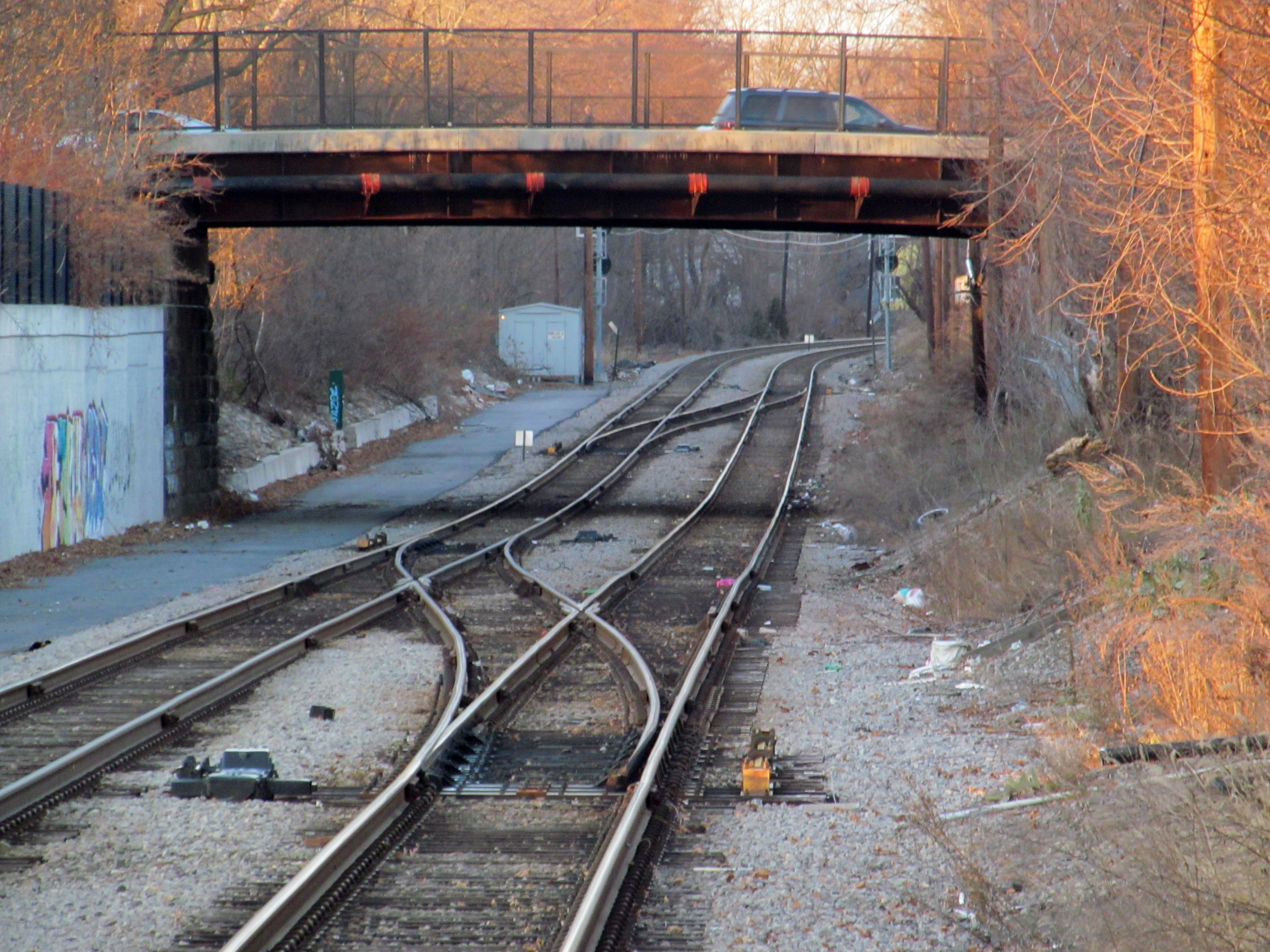
PARK interlocking, just north of Talbot Ave station, was added in 2007–2008

Map of the line showing the new stations

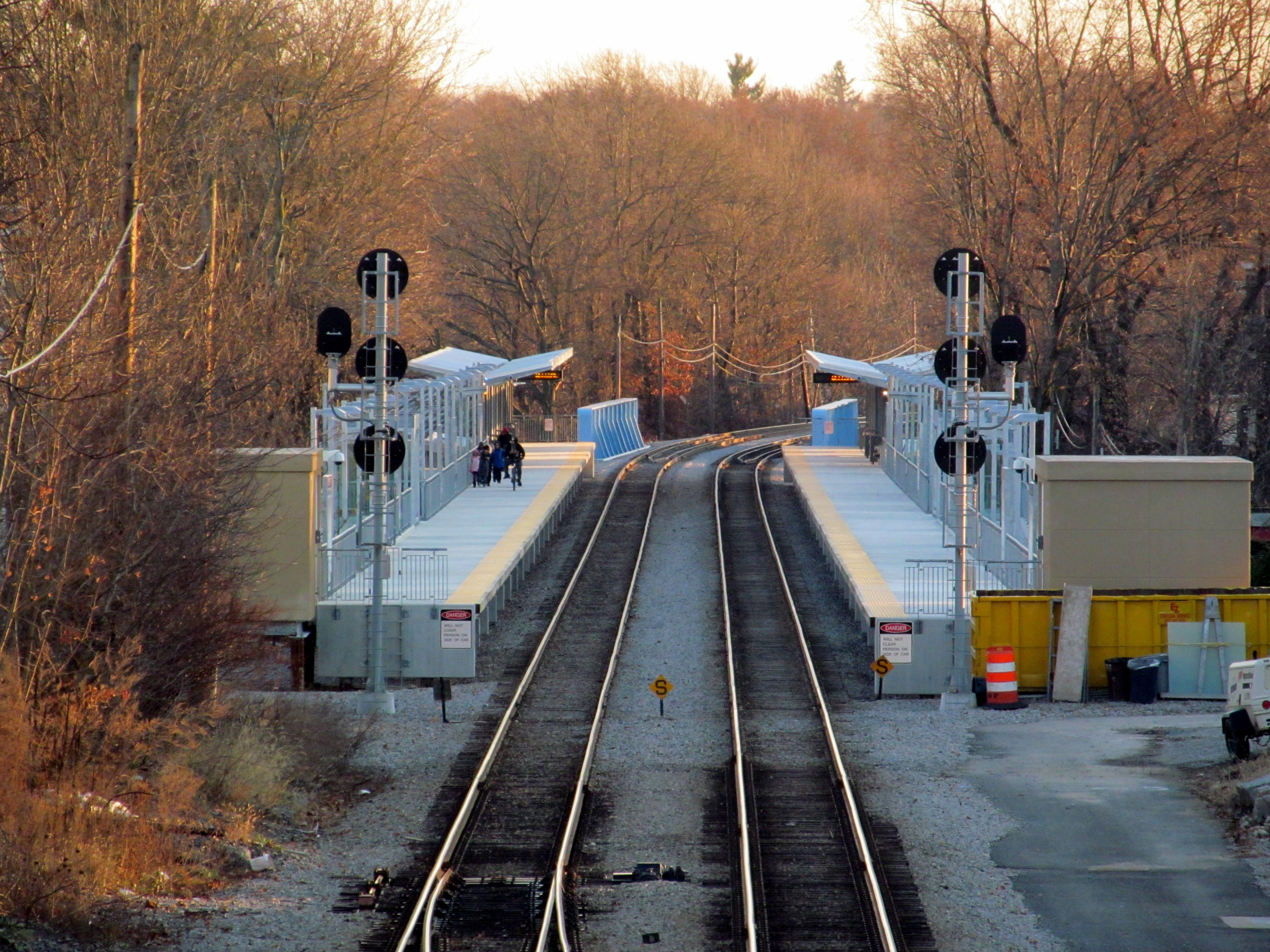
Talbot Ave was the first new station to open under the Fairmount line improvements project

The Commonwealth of Massachusetts agreed in 2005 to make improvements on the Fairmount Line part of its legally binding commitment to mitigate increased air pollution from the Big Dig. To comply with the State Implementation Plan filed with the federal Environmental Protection Agency, the improvements were required to have been completed by December 31, 2011. As an interim deadline, the Massachusetts Executive Office of Transportation was required to "complete final design, apply for all necessary permits and grants, file any required legislation, and initiate all public and private land acquisition" by December 1, 2009.

The existing Uphams Corner and Morton Street stations were rebuilt, featuring high-level train platforms for easy boarding, canopies, access ramps, electronic message boards, and pedestrian-friendly walkways. Since the completion of the project, all stations on the line are compliant with the Americans with Disabilities Act and be wheelchair-accessible. Four new stations were constructed at Four Corners/Geneva, Talbot Avenue, Blue Hill Avenue, and Newmarket. Additionally, six bridges have been reconstructed, a new interlocking was added, and the signal system has been rebuilt.

The MBTA has allocated $37 million to the project and $39 million has been allocated from the Commonwealth from the Emergency Needs Bond Bill of 2007. The total cost of the project is estimated at $79.4 million. The addition of new stations and the upgrades to the existing infrastructure are projected to divert 220 daily trips from automobiles to transit, and increase daily weekday ridership on the line from around 2,800 to 7,300 one-way trips. A $22.9 million reconstruction of the Massachusetts Avenue, Quincy Street, and Columbia Road bridges began in January 2007.

The plan adopted by the MBTA is based on the Indigo Line plan advanced by community activists, which was intended to make the characteristics of the line more like rapid transit than commuter rail, with increased frequency and number of stops. However, in its initial proposal the MBTA did not plan to increase service frequency to match rapid transit lines, nor to install pre-pay fare systems. The Indigo Line plan also called for the use of diesel multiple unit (DMU) cars for faster acceleration and deceleration, which was considered by the MBTA but not implemented initially because of lack of funding. The Massachusetts state legislature's proposed 2014 state budget included some funds to purchase DMU railcars and the state issued a request for proposals to purchase 30 DMUs, with deliveries starting in 2018, but the plan was canceled in 2016.

The first new station to be completed, Talbot Ave, opened on November 12, 2012. Newmarket and Four Corners/Geneva opened on July 1, 2013. Five new round trips were also added, and Fairmount station was changed to fare zone 1A (to reduce fares to the same as rapid transit) for two years as a pilot program. Ribbon-cutting ceremonies were held at Newmarket, Four Corners/Geneva Ave, and Talbot Ave on July 17, 2013.

The location and design of Blue Hill Avenue has been more controversial. A public meeting held in April 2014 showed mixed local opinions about the stations, with some nearby residents feeling that the stop was imposed on the neighborhood by the MBTA without sufficient public input. At a later meeting, the MBTA presented a plan under which construction would begin in September 2015 for a June 2017 opening. On October 16, 2014, the MBTA announced that construction of Blue Hill Avenue station will resume, with 100 percent design expected in spring 2015 and construction to start that November for a December 2017 opening. The MBTA also then announced that hourly weekend service would begin on November 29, 2014 – the first weekend service on the line since passenger service was reintroduced in 1979. In October 2016, the station entered the bidding phase with construction planned for 2017 and a station opening in 2019. Construction of the station began on June 3, 2017. To accommodate construction work at the station site, all weekend Fairmount Line trains in both directions were cut back to Morton Street, with bus shuttles between Morton Street, Fairmount, and Readville, and late-night outbound Fairmount Line service on weekdays was completely replaced with busses. The station opened on February 25, 2019.

The line was shut down on weekends in November and December 2017 for the installation of Positive Train Control equipment in order to meet a 2020 federal deadline. Reconstruction of the Norfolk Avenue and East Cottage Street bridges took place in the 2020s.

=== 2020–21 pilots and COVID-19 pandemic ===
A 2010 study on the potential addition of regular commuter service to the limited-service station at Foxboro included the possibility of extending Fairmount Line trains to Foxboro. In August 2017, the MBTA Fiscal Control Board approved an 11-month pilot program to test commuter rail service to Foxboro, with service planned to begin sometime in late 2018 or early 2019, although Fairmount Line advocates warned it might reduce service quality to existing Fairmount Line stations. Service to Foxboro – a combination of extended Fairmount Line trains and rerouted Franklin Line trains – began on October 21, 2019. Some local advocates have criticized the extension, saying it would degrade service at existing stops for the benefit of wealthier suburban commuters, while others believe it may make higher-frequency service possible.

In January 2020, the MBTA Fiscal Management and Control Board voted to add four weekday Fairmount Line round trips as a one-year pilot program, originally planned to begin on May 18, 2020, but later postponed due to the COVID-19 pandemic. The $1.1 million pilot increased service to 24 round trips on weekdays. CharlieCard readers were placed at stations to provide a proof-of-payment ticket that allows a transfer to subway or bus. The expanded service began on June 22, 2020, after three months of systemwide reduced service due to pandemic. One additional round trip was added on November 2, 2020, with 45-minute headways all day, as part of a systemwide transition to a regional rail model. Foxboro service was suspended at that time, with plans to resume in Spring 2021 (though that did not occur). Weekday service was temporarily reduced to hourly headways from December 14, 2020, to April 5, 2021, again as part of systemwide reductions.

As of February 2022, the line had 23 1/2 round trips on weekdays and 12 on weekends. Beginning May 23, 2022, bicycles are allowed on all Fairmount Line trains. The 2020-added round trips were made permanent, as were free transfers to bus and subway plus use of Charliecards for payment. Limited Foxboro service also resumed at that time, albeit only with trains running via Ruggles rather than via the Fairmount Line. By October 2022, daily ridership was at 2,843 – 107% of 2018 ridership, compared to the system average of 69%. Ridership reached 130% of pre-COVID ridership in May 2023 – the highest ridership recorded on the line in the MBTA era. Until May 2023, all intermediate stations on the line were flag stops outside of weekday peak hours. Effective May 22, 2023, they were made regular scheduled stops at all times. On October 2, 2023, the last evening Stoughton-bound train began operating via the Fairmount Line – the first such service since 2004. Service on the line was increased to 30-minute headways (including weekends) on May 20, 2024. Some midday trains began short-turning at Fairmount at that time. All weekend Franklin/Foxboro Line trains also began operating over the Fairmount Line. Daily ridership was 4,402 by 2024.

=== Electrification ===
In the years following the cancellation of the Indigo Line proposal in 2016, transit advocates and lawmakers have called for the full electrification of the Fairmount Line. In June 2022, the MBTA indicated plans to convert the Fairmount Line to electric service in 2028–29. Catenary would not be installed on the line; battery electric multiple units (BEMUs) would be used, with a charging location at Readville. In December 2023, MBTA Commuter Rail operator Keolis solicited a proposal to procure BEMUs and implement 20-minute headways on the Fairmount Line by 2027 as leverage for contract renewal; the MBTA issued a notice of due diligence in March 2024. The MBTA board approved the $54 million proposal in July 2024, with the new equipment to enter service in early 2028. Keolis will construct a light maintenance facility for BEMUs as part of the contract. By November 2024, Keolis expected to issue a request for proposals for rolling stock in December 2024 and for financing in early 2025. The rolling stock RFP was released in February 2025, followed by the financing RFP in May 2025. Stadler was selected in May 2026 to provide seven 4-car trainsets with purchase options for 96 additional cars. Rock Rail will finance the construction of the trainsets and lease them to Keolis for 15 years, with agreements with the MBTA to transfer them to a future commuter rail operator if Keolis's commuter rail operating contract is not renewed after 2027. The first trainsets are planned to be delivered for testing in Q4 2029. Delivery was delayed from the initial goal of 2028 revenue service because the MBTA requested the addition of accessible seating in all train cars rather than just one per train (the federal minimum), to maintain existing levels of accessibility on MBTA Commuter Rail.

Midday and weekend service on the line was reduced on June 2, 2025, to accommodate replacement of all track in preparation for the new rolling stock. Regular service resumed on December 1, 2025, after completion of the $12 million project. As of May 2026, a two-track maintenance facility is planned to be built at Readville Yard with possibility of future expansion, along with charging stations for 7 BEMUs and an electrical substation. Potential use of layover tracks at Widett Circle was also noted. Previous plans from October 2025 involved a six-track layover facility for the electric Fairmount Line trains to be built at Widett Circle.

== Station listing ==
=== Current stations ===
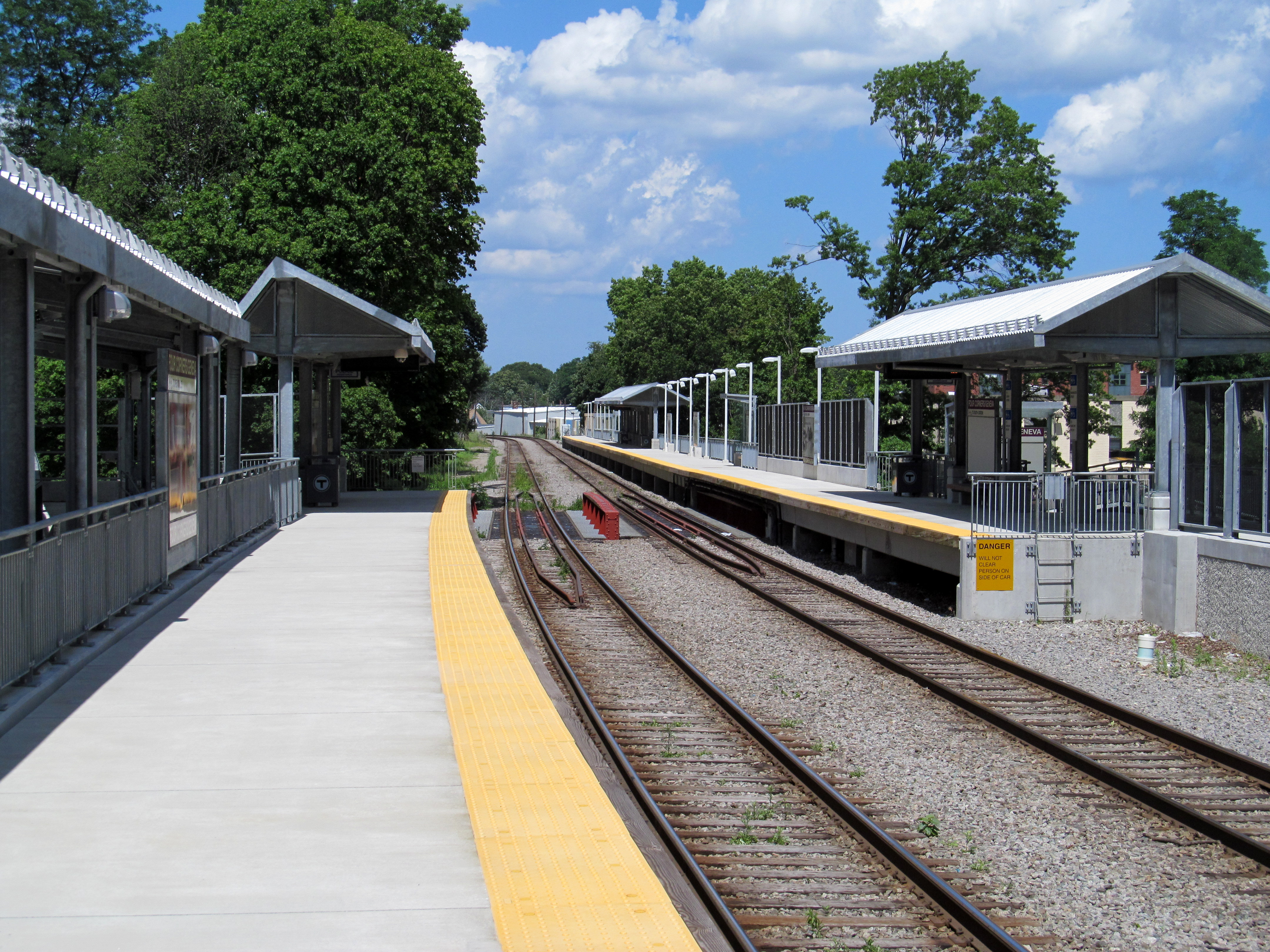
Four Corners/Geneva station shortly after its opening in July 2013

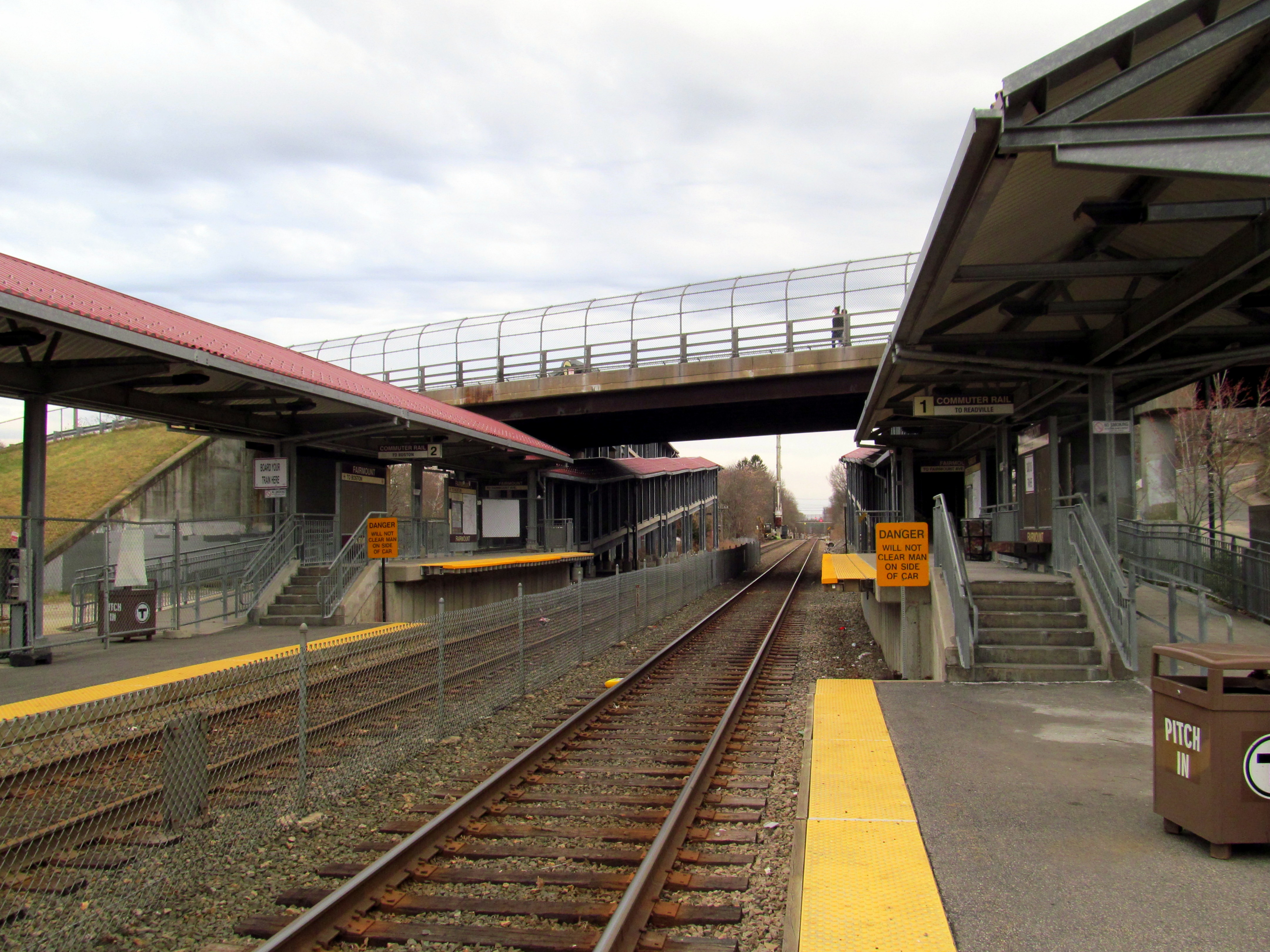
Fairmount station was rebuilt in 2005

Fare zone	Mile (km)	Station	Connections and notes
1A	0.0 (0.0)	South Station	Amtrak: Acela, Lake Shore Limited, Northeast Regional; MBTA Commuter Rail: Fall River/New Bedford, Framingham/Worcester, Franklin/Foxboro, Greenbush, Kingston, Needham, and Providence/Stoughton lines; CapeFlyer (seasonal); MBTA subway: Red Line, Silver Line (SL1, SL2, SL3, SL4); MBTA bus: 4, 7, 11; Intercity buses at South Station Bus Terminal
1A	2.0 (3.2)	Newmarket	MBTA bus: 8, 10
1A	2.4 (3.9)	Uphams Corner	MBTA bus: 15, 41
1A	3.4 (5.5)	Four Corners/Geneva	MBTA bus: 19, 23
1A	4.5 (7.2)	Talbot Avenue	MBTA bus: 22
1A	5.3 (8.5)	Morton Street	MBTA bus: 21, 26
1A	6.0 (9.7)	Blue Hill Avenue	MBTA bus: 28, 29, 30, 31
1A	7.9 (12.7)	Fairmount	MBTA bus: 24, 33
2	9.2 (14.8)	Readville	MBTA Commuter Rail: Franklin/Foxboro and Providence/Stoughton lines MBTA bus: 32, 33

=== Historical and current stations ===
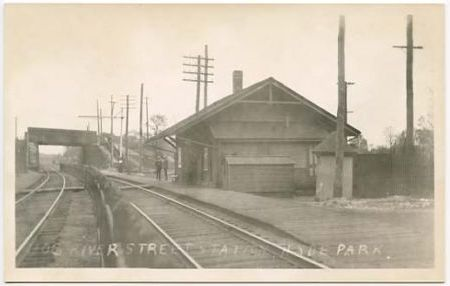
An early postcard of River Street station

Mile (km)	Station	Notes
0.0 (0.0)	South Station	
0.7 (1.1)	South Boston	Formerly located at West 4th Street
2.0 (3.2)	Newmarket	Opened 2013
2.4 (3.9)	Uphams Corner	Formerly Stoughton Street (until 1880s), then Dudley Street (until 1921)
2.8 (4.5)	Bird Street	
3.4 (5.5)	Four Corners/Geneva	Opened 2013
3.6 (5.8)	Mount Bowdoin	
4.1 (6.6)	Harvard Street	
4.5 (7.2)	Talbot Avenue	Opened 2012
4.7 (7.6)	Dorchester	Formerly located at Woodrow Avenue
5.3 (8.5)	Morton Street	Originally Forest Avenue (pre-1944)
6.0 (9.7)	Blue Hill Avenue	Originally Mattapan (pre-1944)
6.5 (10.5)	Rugby	Formerly located at Greenfield Road
6.8 (10.9)	River Street	
7.9 (12.7)	Fairmount	Sometimes (pre-1944) known as Hyde Park
8.3 (13.4)	Glenwood	Formerly located at Glenwood Avenue; opened in 1895.
9.2 (14.8)	Readville	
Currently operating station
