= 88 stations case =

Palmer v. Massachusetts
- Supreme Court of the United States

Argued October 11, 1939 Decided November 6, 1939
- Full case name: Palmer et al, trustees, v. Massachusetts
- Citations: 308 U.S. 79 (more) 60 S.Ct. 34; 84 L.Ed. 93

Case history
- Prior: Converse v. Massachusetts, 101 F.2d 48 (2d Cir. 1939), affirmed

Holding
- District Court was without power to order discontinuance of intrastate railroad service

Court membership
- Chief Justice Charles E. Hughes Associate Justices James C. McReynolds · Pierce Butler; Harlan F. Stone · Owen Roberts; Hugo Black · Stanley F. Reed; Felix Frankfurter · William O. Douglas

Case opinion
- Majority: Frankfurter, joined by Hughes, McReynolds, Stone, Roberts, Black, Reed
- Butler took no part in the consideration or decision of the case.

Laws applied
- Bankruptcy Act of 1898 § 77

The 88 stations case was a 1935–40 controversy and court case involving the Old Colony Division of the New York, New Haven and Hartford Railroad. The New Haven entered bankruptcy in 1935; the next year, it ended the 1893 lease of the unprofitable Old Colony Division, but continued operating those lines by court order. The Old Colony and New Haven closed 88 stations in Massachusetts (plus five in Rhode Island) on July 18, 1938, ending passenger service altogether on some lines. In May 1939, the Old Colony filed to abandon all freight and passenger service on its lines. In November 1939, the Supreme Court of the United States ruled in Palmer v. Massachusetts that a district court did not have authority to order the discontinuance of intrastate passenger service. Thirty-two of the stations were reopened in 1940, with 40 percent of service cut in lieu of total abandonment.

== History ==
=== Background ===
The Old Colony Railroad consolidated most rail lines in southeastern Massachusetts under its control in the 1870s and 1880s, including a lease of the Boston and Providence Railroad in 1888. The New York and New England Railroad (NY&NE) controlled several additional lines including the Charles River Branch, Dorchester Branch, and its Boston–Hartford mainline. The New York, New Haven and Hartford Railroad (New Haven) leased the Old Colony in 1893 and the NYN&NE in 1895, creating a railroad monopoly in southeastern Massachusetts and much of Rhode Island.

The New Haven's 99-year lease of the Old Colony was treated as equivalent to ownership, with the Old Colony fully integrated into the New Haven system. Redundant routes were cut, and both public and internal documents used only the New Haven name. By the 1930s, the New Haven's largest freight terminal and only steam locomotive shop were both on the ex-Old Colony system; more passengers entered Boston on Old Colony lines than entered New York on the New Haven.

Short-distance passenger service in New England peaked around 1900, and began falling as electric streetcars and then automobiles took traffic. Increased freight traffic during World War I further reduced passenger operations. Several lightly used Old Colony branch lines were replaced with buses in the 1920s and early 1930s, while the Shawmut and Milton branches were replaced by a rapid transit extension. The New Haven suffered a sharp reduction in revenues during the early years of the Great Depression.

Cases such as Munn v. Illinois (1876) and Wabash, St. Louis & Pacific Railway Co. v. Illinois (1886) had established the rights of the state and federal governments to regulate railroads to protect the public interest. Interstate service was largely regulated by the federal Interstate Commerce Commission (ICC), which had limited intrastate authority – it could prevent a railroad from abandoning service on a line, but could not regulate the quantity of service provided. State agencies, such as the Massachusetts Public Utilities Commission (PUC), had more regulatory power over intrastate service.

Prior to 1933, railroad reorganizations rarely had negative effects on users (passengers and freight shippers), as receivership typically involved a deferment of debts rather than cuts to service. Management changes and a reduction in deferred maintenance sometimes even resulted in improved service for users. The Act of March 3, 1933 (the final day of Herbert Hoover's presidency) added three new sections to the Bankruptcy Act of 1898; Section 77 brought railroads under the Bankruptcy Act for the first time. Major amendments on August 27, 1935, attempted to streamline the bankruptcy process, as the complexity of railroads had resulted in protracted proceedings. The Depression and automobile competition made increasing revenues near-impossible, while the Railway Labor Act disallowed wage reductions. Since only major corridors tended to be profitable, lesser-used lines and stations were increasingly targeted for elimination during bankruptcy proceedings.

=== New Haven bankruptcy ===
On October 23, 1935, the New Haven petitioned the United States District Court for the District of Connecticut to begin bankruptcy proceedings under Section 77. The court appointed trustees for the railroad, who "tentatively" continued paying the Old Colony lease. The public largely saw the proceedings as a chance for the New Haven to escape its early-20th-century debt; Old Colony stock rose from 39 to 70 by March 1936. On June 1, 1936, the trustees rejected the Old Colony lease based on studies that found it unprofitable. As the Old Colony was merely a "bookkeeping device" with all railroad operations directed by the New Haven, the court ordered on June 3 that the New Haven continue to operate the Old Colony but on the Old Colony's account. The court also approved the Old Colony's petition to enter the same reorganization proceedings as the New Haven; on June 18, the three New Haven trustees were also designated trustees of the Old Colony.

On June 1, 1937, the New Haven submitted its reorganization plan, under which the Old Colony would be acquired at a rate of two New Haven shares per Old Colony share. Old Colony shareholders demanded a higher rate, leading the ICC to examine the value and costs of the Old Colony to the greater New Haven system. The trustees produced a formula to segregate the earnings and costs of the Old Colony to establish charges for continued operation. The ICC approved the formula, albeit with substantial doubts about the validity of its results, on April 15, 1938. The court approved it on May 25; the Old Colony did not appeal. Abandonments of several minor lines during this time deprived the Old Colony of connecting traffic, as did the July 1937 discontinuance of Fall River Line steamship service between New York City and the South Coast.

=== Station closures case ===
The railroad attempted to close 22 low-ridership stations effective September 27, 1937, and removed them from public timetables. (Note: The 22 stations were Stanley, East Freetown, Weld Street, Springdale, West Stoughton, Easton, Whittendon, Ferry Street, Boylston, Jamaica Plain, Forest Hills, Mount Hope, Sharon Heights, East Foxboro, West Mansfield, Ashcroft, Winslows, Highland Lake, Plimptonville, City Mills, Spring Street, and Needham Heights.) The Massachusetts Public Utilities Commission (PUC) rejected the closures because they were improperly filed, and the stations remained open; passenger counts were taken at most of the stations in October. On November 18, the PUC ordered that the 22 stations be restored to timetables effective November 29, and remain open for at least 30 days afterward. The same day, the railroad filed a new petition with the PUC to abandon 14 of the stations. (Note: The 14 stations were Springdale, West Stoughton, Easton, Whittendon, Sharon Heights, East Foxboro, West Mansfield, Ashcroft, Winslows, Highland Lake, Plimptonville, City Mills, Spring Street, and Ferry Street.) On December 28, 1937, the Old Colony trustees filed with the PUC to abandon passenger service to 74 additional stations in Massachusetts, bringing the total to 88, while retaining freight service.

The railroad filed the proposed new schedules on January 31, 1938; the PUC began "lengthy" hearings. All passenger service was to end on the Randolph Branch, the Cape Main Line between Yarmouth and Provincetown, the Newport Secondary between Newport and Fall River (including five additional stations in Rhode Island), the Dorchester Branch, the Wrentham Branch, the Charles River Branch, between West Roxbury and Dedham, and between North Easton and Taunton; some minor stations would be closed on lines that retained service. Fifty-eight of the stations were on Old Colony lines; ten were on B&P lines, and 25 on NY&NE lines.

On June 20, 1938, the trustees and a bondholders committee petitioned the court to allow closure of the 93 stations regardless of the PUC outcome. The PUC (which had not yet finished its hearings) appeared in the hearing but did not call or cross-examine witnesses, and did not argue whether the court had jurisdiction in the matter. On July 7, Judge Carroll C. Hincks issued an order allowing the railroad to close the stations; the PUC appealed, and the state formed a legislative committee to investigate the matter. The 93 stations were closed effective Sunday, July 17, 1938.

The PUC, doubtful the validity of Hicks' order, selected the Yarmouth–Provincetown service – the most disruptive of the closures – as a test case. In late July, the PUC ordered the Old Colony to reinstate one round trip and seven of the fourteen stations. The railroad filed a bill in equity in the United States District Court for the District of Massachusetts, seeking an injunction to prevent the PUC or Massachusetts Attorney General Paul A. Dever from enforcing the PUC order. Dever, in return, petitioned the Massachusetts Supreme Court to enforce the PUC order, and appealed Hincks' decision to the United States Court of Appeals for the Second Circuit. The parties agreed to postpone the conflicting court filings until the appeals court ruled.

The PUC appeal went to the appeals court before judges Learned Hand, Thomas Walter Swan, and Augustus Noble Hand. On January 16, 1939, the court ruled 2–1 in Converse v. Massachusetts that Hincks had exceeded his jurisdiction by issuing the order closing the 88 stations. The trustees appealed, and the stations remained closed. On November 6, 1939, the United States Supreme Court ruled 8–0 in Palmer v. Massachusetts to confirm the circuit court ruling that only the PUC had the power to allow station closures, and that the ongoing bankruptcy proceedings did not give Hincks the power to overrule the PUC.

On November 28, 1939, the PUC issued an order that the 88 stations in Massachusetts be reopened by December 10. The New Haven and the PUC reached an agreement on December 5 under which the order would be stayed for 30 days and that the PUC would allow some lesser-used stations to close, in exchange for the railroad agreeing to reopen some stations. After hearings, the PUC ruled on February 21, 1940, that the railroad must restore service to 32 of the 88 stations, with the remaining 56 allowed to permanently close. Service was restored to 25 stations – including Readville–Boston service on the Dorchester Branch, and service on the Charles River Branch as far as Caryville – on March 11, 1940. Many of the station buildings had been abandoned or sold, with small wooden shelters provided instead. Seven additional stations on the Yarmouth–Provincetown segment reopened around June 24 for summer seasonal service.

=== Abandonment proposal ===
On July 18, 1938, the court approved the New Haven charging the Old Colony over $11 million (equivalent to over $192 million in 2024) in operating costs under the segregation formula. The Old Colony could not appeal the charges because it had not appealed the formula earlier in the year. By this point, Old Colony stock was below 50 cents.

On May 31, 1939, with Palmer v. Massachusetts pending, the Old Colony filed an amended reorganization plan calling for the abandonment of all passenger service in the "Boston Group" – the primary group of lines into Boston, including the Greenbush, Plymouth, and Middleborough lines and the shared mainline north of Braintree. At that time, 121 daily trains were operated on those lines. Freight service on some lines of the Boston Group would continue, though others would be fully abandoned. The New Haven simultaneously filed its own amended plan which stated that it was not willing to directly acquire the Old Colony unless all Boston Group passenger service was discontinued, but did wish to directly acquire the B&P. The New Haven would continue to operate passenger trains from the South Coast and Cape Cod, which together lost one-third of what the Boston group did, reaching Boston via Taunton and the B&P mainline. It would purchase the Old Colony's lines in Cape Cod and west of Boston (which collectively made a profit on freight), as well as the South Boston Market Terminal; the New Haven and Old Colony would split the latter's share of the Union Freight Railroad.

On June 12, 1939, the trustees filed for a September 24 discontinuance of all passenger service in the Boston Group, as well as to Cape Cod (which had not been slated for discontinuance in the May proposal). This resulted in an "uproar of confusion, resentment, and panic" from the public and the Massachusetts government. Dever, alleging that the New Haven had betrayed the public trust and failed to prove the claimed losses on the Old Colony, threatened to revoke the franchise of the New Haven in the state. On June 14, the ICC unexpectedly announced that the proposed abandonment would not be considered as part of the ongoing reorganization, but would instead require separate proceedings.

In late August, the state legislature and the railroad agreed to postpone any discontinuance until January 1, 1940. In September 1939, the New Haven proposed to cut most Old Colony passenger service. Boston–Braintree service would continue to operate, with three trips each serving Campello, Whitman, and Hingham at peak hours. Service to Greenbush, Plymouth, Middleborough, Hyannis, and Woods Hole would be replaced by buses, as would all off-peak service south of Braintree.

In November 1939, the trustees filed with the ICC to outright abandon freight and passenger service on the entire Boston Group. Under a December deal between the New Haven and a legislative commission, Boston Group service was reduced from 121 to about 80 daily trips effective January 7. As PUC hearings continued into 1940, the railroad continued to advocate for its September proposal with only limited service beyond Braintree. In March, the PUC approved schedules with 72 daily trains. These schedules, which eliminated most midday and evening service past Braintree, took effect on April 1.

The ICC began abandonment proceedings on March 16, 1940. On February 18, 1941, the ICC refused abandonment of the Boston Group, forcing the Old Colony to continue operations. (Passenger service on one short line in the Boston Group, the West Quincy Branch, was separately discontinued by PUC approval in September 1940.) Whether to incorporate the Old Colony into the New Haven, and whether the Old Colony should be required to continue passenger service, continued to be argued as part of the reorganization.

=== Later changes ===
Most of the reopened stations did not remain in service for long. Provincetown service ended after the 1940 summer season, and three stations (Forest Hills, Boylston Street, and Jamaica Plain) also closed that year. Caryville service was cut back to West Medway in September 1941. Dorchester Branch service ended on March 12, 1944, with nine stations closed. Ferry Street station reopened sometime after 1940.

Increased passenger and freight traffic during World War II lifted the fortunes of the New Haven. The reorganization continued; the railroad was ultimately required to continue Old Colony passenger service unless losses exceeded $850,000 in a single calendar year. The New Haven emerged from bankruptcy on September 11, 1947, and fully acquired the Old Colony a week later; the B&P was kept as a separate New Haven-owned company. Palmer v. Massachusetts had been just one of eight Supreme Court cases generated by the reorganization. Losses on the Old Colony reached the critical value in October 1948; after threatening to discontinue all service, the New Haven cut back to a 26-train peak-only schedule on the Boston Group in March 1949.

Under the 1951–1954 presidency of Frederic C. Dumaine Jr., the New Haven increased passenger service, using new Budd Rail Diesel Cars to reduce costs. Boston service reached 86 trains in April 1954. As losses mounted, Boston-area railroads made major cuts in the late 1950s. All service to Taunton, Fall River, and New Bedford (which now used the B&P rather than the original Old Colony mainline) ended in 1958. All remaining year-round Old Colony Division service ended on June 30, 1959, though limited seasonal service continued for several more years. The Massachusetts Bay Transportation Authority (MBTA) was founded in 1964 to subsidize remaining suburban service. West Medway service was cut back to Millis in 1966, and ended entirely the next year. East Foxboro station closed in 1977.

MBTA Commuter Rail service expansions have restored several former Old Colony lines, including some stations closed in 1938. Service on the Dorchester Branch began in 1979 as a temporary bypass during Southwest Corridor construction (at which time Mount Hope station was closed). The service was made permanent in 1987, with several additional stations near former station sites opened in 2012, 2013, and 2019. The MBTA restored service on the Plymouth/Kingston Line and Middleborough/Lakeville Line in 1997 (including 1938-closed Halifax), and on the Greenbush Line in 2007 (including 1938-closed West Hingham and Nantasket Junction). A new Bourne station, relocated from the original site, opened in 2019 for the seasonal CapeFLYER service. Only one station reopened in 1940 – Plimptonville – remained continuously open past 1979; it was temporarily closed in 2020, and subsequently permanently closed in 2021.

== Stations ==
Locations of the 93 stations
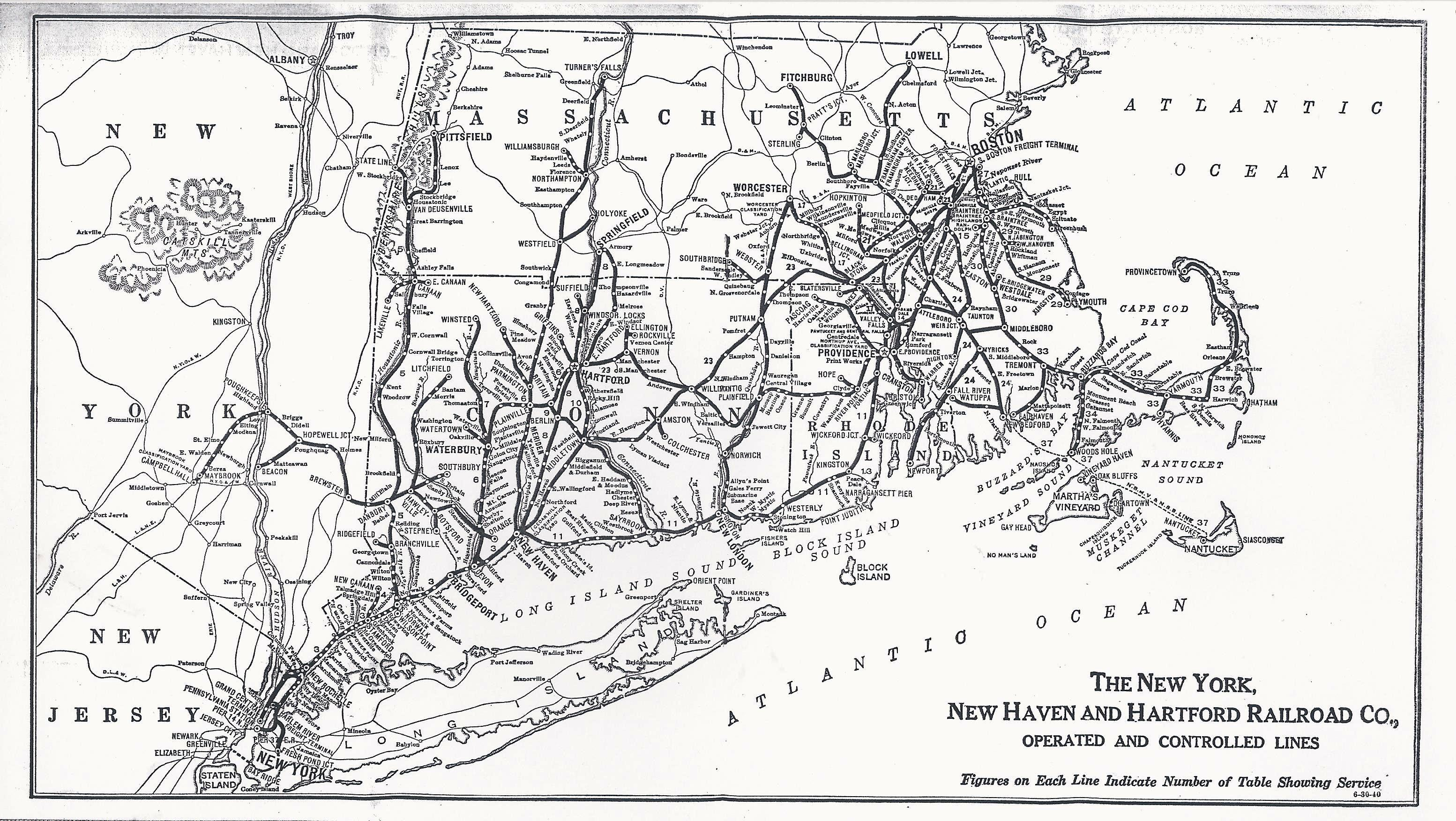
Detail from a 1940 map of the New Haven Railroad, showing its lines in Eastern Massachusetts

Line	Station	Reopened
Greenbush Branch	East Braintree	March 11, 1940
Greenbush Branch	West Hingham	October 31, 2007
Greenbush Branch	Nantasket Junction	October 31, 2007
Greenbush Branch	North Cohasset	–
Greenbush Branch	Black Rock	–
Greenbush Branch	Beechwood	–
Randolph Branch	Randolph	–
Plymouth Branch	North Hanson	–
Plymouth Branch	Burrage	–
Plymouth Branch	Halifax	September 30, 1997
Plymouth Branch	Plympton	–
Middleborough Main Line	Matfield	–
Middleborough Main Line	Westdale	–
Middleborough Main Line	Stanley	–
Cape Main Line	Rock	–
Cape Main Line	South Middleboro	–
Cape Main Line	Tremont	–
Cape Main Line	Bourne	May 24, 2019 (seasonally, for CapeFLYER service)
Cape Main Line	Sagamore	–
Cape Main Line	East Sandwich	–
Cape Main Line	Bass River	–
Cape Main Line	South Dennis	June 24, 1940
Cape Main Line	North Harwich	–
Cape Main Line	Harwich	June 24, 1940
Cape Main Line	Pleasant Lake	–
Cape Main Line	Brewster	–
Cape Main Line	East Brewster	–
Cape Main Line	Orleans	June 24, 1940
Cape Main Line	Eastham	June 24, 1940
Cape Main Line	North Eastham	–
Cape Main Line	South Wellfleet	–
Cape Main Line	Wellfleet	June 24, 1940
Cape Main Line	South Truro	–
Cape Main Line	Truro	June 24, 1940
Cape Main Line	North Truro	–
Cape Main Line	Provincetown	June 24, 1940
Woods Hole Branch	Gray Gables	–
New Bedford Subdivision	Norton	–
New Bedford Subdivision	East Freetown	–
New Bedford Subdivision	Brayleys	–
New Bedford Subdivision	Weld Street	–
Fall River–Newport	Ferry Street	c. 1940s
Fall River–Newport	Tiverton, RI	–
Fall River–Newport	Bristol Ferry, RI	–
Fall River–Newport	Portsmouth, RI	–
Fall River–Newport	Middletown, RI	–
Fall River–Newport	Newport, RI	–
Canton Junction–Whittendon	Springdale	–
Canton Junction–Whittendon	West Stoughton	–
Canton Junction–Whittendon	Easton	–
Canton Junction–Whittendon	Whittendon	–
Providence–Boston	Boylston	March 11, 1940
Providence–Boston	Jamaica Plain	March 11, 1940
Providence–Boston	Forest Hills	March 11, 1940
Providence–Boston	Mount Hope	March 11, 1940
Providence–Boston	Sharon Heights	–
Providence–Boston	East Foxboro	March 11, 1940
Providence–Boston	West Mansfield	–
Dorchester Branch	Uphams Corner	March 11, 1940
Dorchester Branch	Bird Street	March 11, 1940
Dorchester Branch	Mount Bowdoin	March 11, 1940
Dorchester Branch	Harvard Street	March 11, 1940
Dorchester Branch	Dorchester	March 11, 1940
Dorchester Branch	Morton Street	March 11, 1940
Dorchester Branch	Blue Hill Avenue	March 11, 1940
Dorchester Branch	River Street	March 11, 1940
Dorchester Branch	Fairmount	March 11, 1940
Wrentham Branch	Morrills	–
Wrentham Branch	East Walpole	–
Wrentham Branch	Walpole Heights	–
Wrentham Branch	Pondville	–
Wrentham Branch	Wrentham	–
Wrentham Branch	Lake Pearl	–
Wrentham Branch	Wampum	–
Wrentham Branch	Plainville	–
Wrentham Branch	North Attleboro	–
Midland Division	Ashcroft	–
Midland Division	Winslows	–
Midland Division	Plimptonville	March 11, 1940
Midland Division	Highland Lake	–
Midland Division	City Mills	–
Dedham–West Roxbury	Spring Street	–
Charles River Branch	Charles River	March 11, 1940
Charles River Branch	Dover	March 11, 1940
Charles River Branch	Farm Street	March 11, 1940
Charles River Branch	Medfield Junction	March 11, 1940
Charles River Branch	Clicquot	March 11, 1940
Charles River Branch	Millis	March 11, 1940
Charles River Branch	Medway	March 11, 1940
Charles River Branch	West Medway	March 11, 1940
Charles River Branch	Caryville	March 11, 1940
Charles River Branch	North Bellingham	–
Charles River Branch	Bellingham Junction	–
