= South Attleboro station =

Railway station in Attleboro, Massachusetts, US

South Attleboro
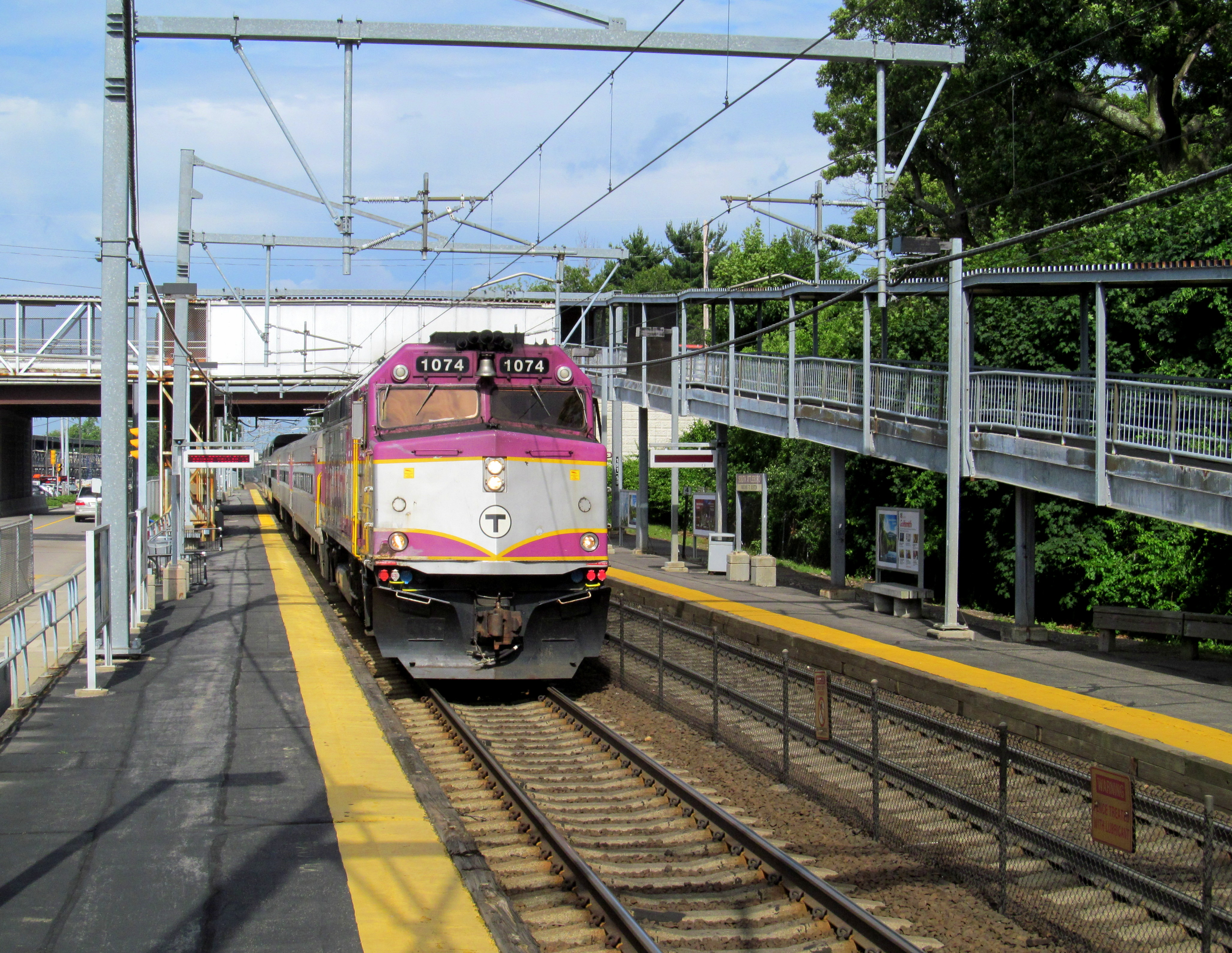
- An outbound train arrives at South Attleboro in June 2013

General information
- Location: 1315 Newport Avenue; Attleboro, Massachusetts
- Coordinates: 41.8976°N 71.3558°W
- Line: Attleboro Line (Northeast Corridor)
- Platforms: 2 side platforms
- Tracks: 2
- Connections: GATRA: 11, 16; RIPTA: 1, 35

Construction
- Parking: 579 spaces ($6.00 fee)
- Cycle facilities: 2 spaces
- Accessible: Yes

Other information
- Fare zone: 7

History
- Opened: July 30, 1990
- Closed: February 26, 2021–May 20, 2024

Passengers
- 2024: 19 daily boardings

Services
Preceding station	MBTA	Following station
Pawtucket/Central Falls toward Wickford Junction	Providence/Stoughton Line	Attleboro toward South Station
Pawtucket/Central Falls toward Providence	Foxboro event service	Attleboro toward Foxboro
Location

South Attleboro station is an MBTA Commuter Rail Providence/Stoughton Line station in Attleboro, Massachusetts. It is located under Newport Avenue (Route 1A) in the South Attleboro neighborhood, just north of the Rhode Island border. The station has two side platforms serving the two tracks of the Northeast Corridor, formerly connected by a footbridge to a park-and-ride lot; only the north platform is in use.

Construction of the station was approved in 1987 and completed the next year. Opening was delayed by a dispute between the Massachusetts Bay Transportation Authority (MBTA) and the Massachusetts Architectural Access Board (MAAB) because the station was not accessible. After the MBTA and MAAB reached an agreement on the length of accessible platforms, the station opened in July 1990. The footbridge was in poor condition by the 2010s, with two sets of stairs closed off. The MBTA issued a contract for design of station improvements, including a new footbridge with elevators, in 2020. The station was temporarily closed on February 26, 2021, due to structural deterioration. Demolition of the footbridge took place in 2023. The MBTA resumed limited service at the station on May 20, 2024.

== Station design ==
South Attleboro station is located under the Newport Avenue (Route 1A) overpass at the far southern edge of Attleboro, just 500 feet (150 m) from the Rhode Island line. The station has two 780-foot (240 m)-long side platforms bracketing the two tracks of the Northeast Corridor; only the north platform is in use. At the west end of the low platforms are 60-foot (18 m) high-level "mini-high" platforms that provide accessible boarding. A footbridge with ramps and stairs formerly connected the south (northbound) platform to the southbound platform and the parking lot on the north side of the tracks. Pre-COVID, the 579-space parking lot filled before the end of the morning peak.

== History ==
=== Former stations ===
The Boston and Providence Railroad (B&P) opened a new route from East Junction (near Hebronville in Attleboro) to Providence via Pawtucket in October 1847 to serve the new Union Station in downtown Providence. There was no station at the modern site, which was not in a populated area during the 19th century; the nearest stations were at Hebronville to the east and Pawtucket–Central Falls to the west. The B&P was acquired in 1888 by the Old Colony Railroad, which was in turn acquired by the New York, New Haven and Hartford Railroad in 1893. The Massachusetts Bay Transportation Authority (MBTA) was formed in 1964 to subsidize suburban commuter rail operations; the line became the Providence/Stoughton Line. Hebronville closed before the MBTA era, while Pawtucket–Central Falls closed on February 20, 1981 when Rhode Island stopped its subsidies and service was cut back to Attleboro.

=== Planning and construction ===
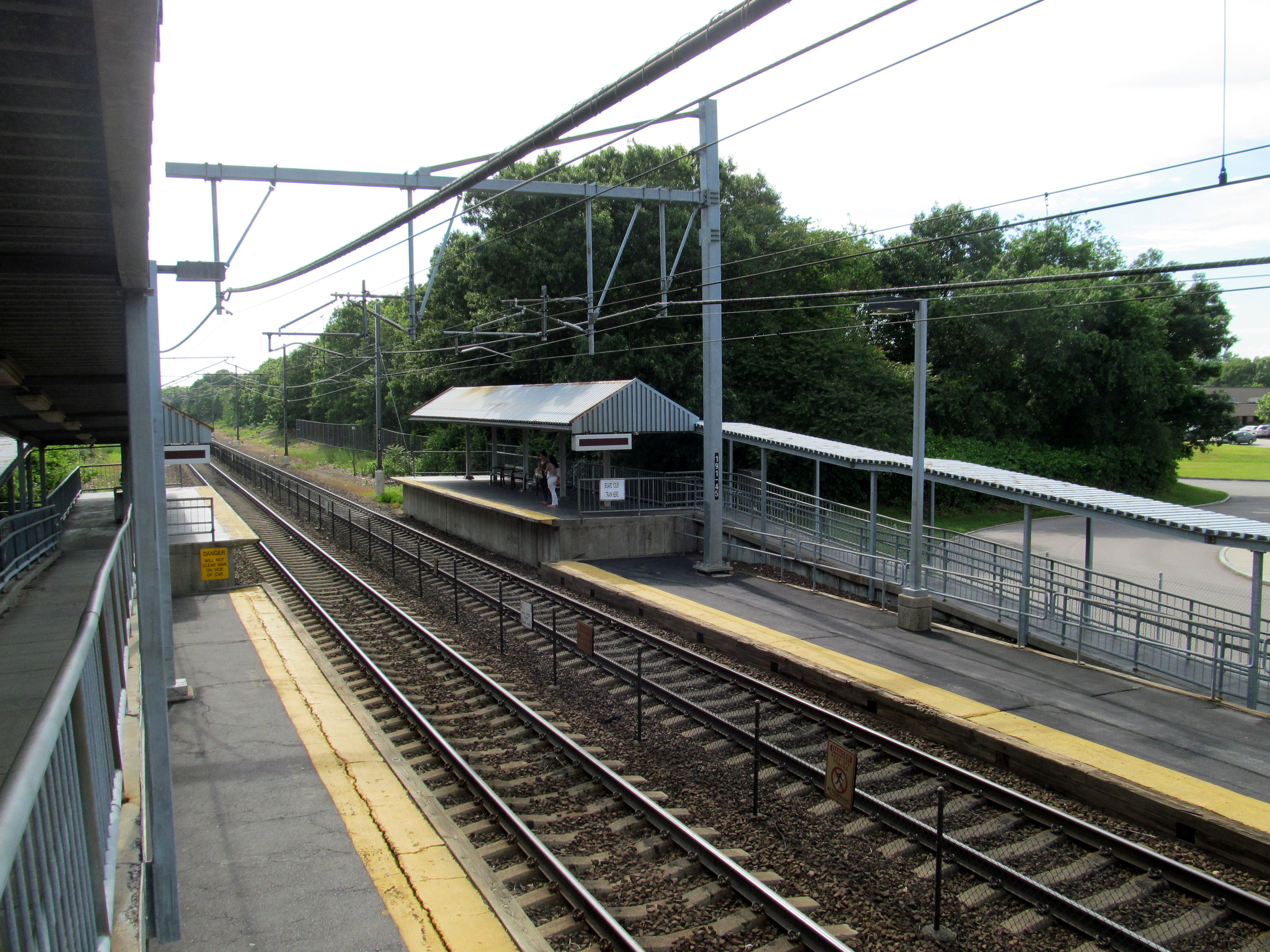
Accessible mini-high platforms at the station

In August 1987, the MBTA approved plans to build a new station at South Attleboro to relieve crowding at Attleboro station. Commuter service returned to Providence on February 1, 1988, but the Pawtucket–Central Falls station remained closed. The $3 million station was completed in September 1988; however, the Massachusetts Architectural Access Board (MAAB) refused to let the station open. The station did not meet state requirements for accessibility: the footbridge had only stairs and no ramps, and no high-level platforms had been built.

The MBTA built ramps and "mini-high" platforms (short sections of high-level platforms) at an additional cost of $1 million in mid-1989. However, the station remained closed because the MAAB insisted on full-length high-level platforms, while the MBTA wished to only build the cheaper mini-high platforms. The MBTA's appeal of the MAAB ruling (which came two years before the Americans with Disabilities Act mandated accessibility nationwide) had system-wide implications, particularly for the then-inaccessible Green Line.

After a judge ruled in favor of the MBTA, the two agencies reached an agreement in March 1990 under which existing mini-high platforms would be extended to 45 feet (14 m) long, and accessible platforms would be installed at all commuter rail stations by 1997 (which did not occur). South Attleboro station ultimately opened on July 30, 1990.

The MBTA began operating Providence–Foxboro service for events at Gillette Stadium in 1997, with South Attleboro as one of the intermediate stops. South Attleboro station was the southern terminus of regular weekend service on the line until June 29, 2006, when Rhode Island began funding weekend service to Providence.

=== Reconstruction ===
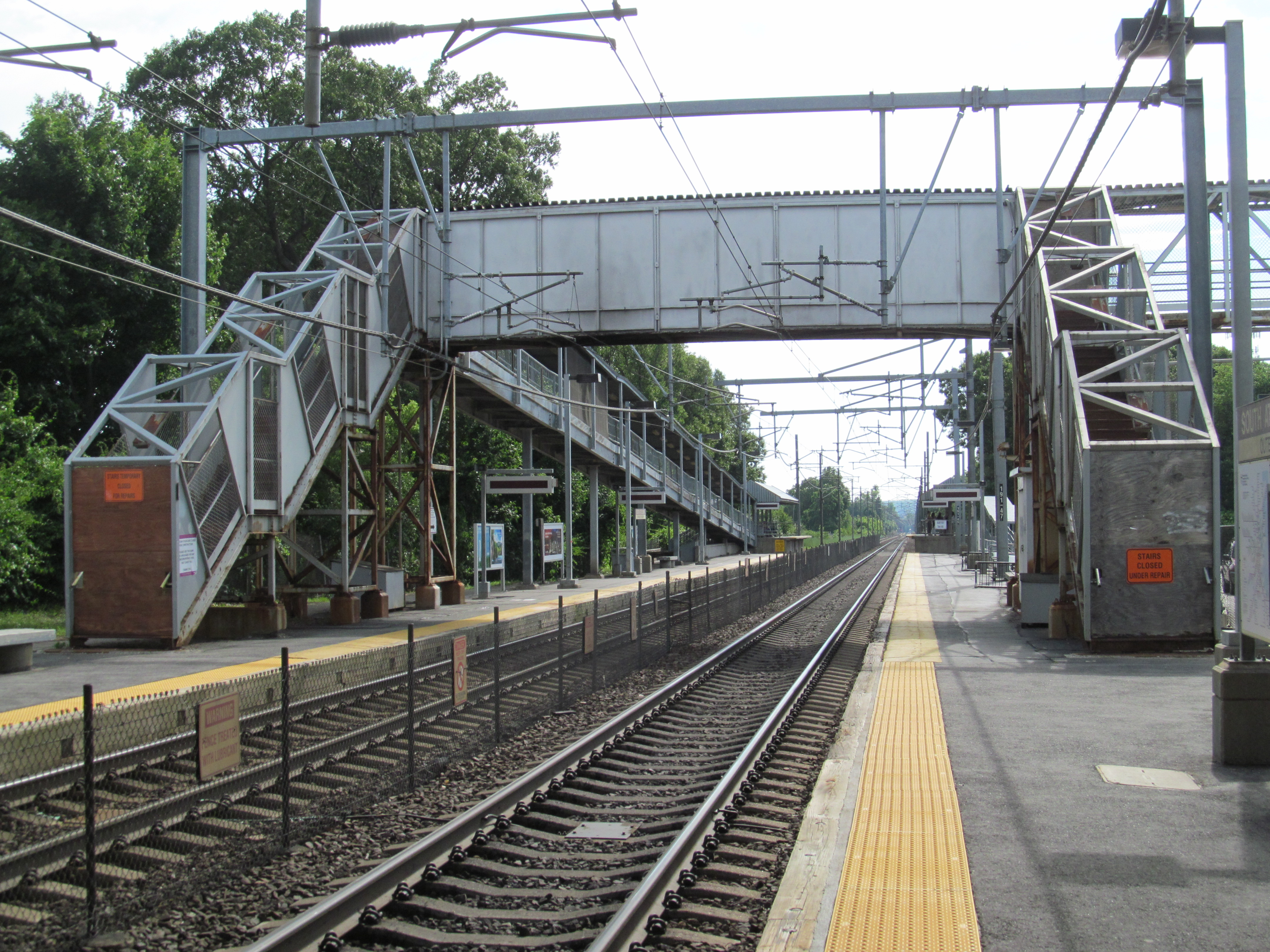
The footbridge in 2013, with two deteriorated staircases closed

In the 2010 Northeast Corridor Master Plan, Amtrak indicated long-term plans to add two outer station sidings and high-level platforms to South Attleboro, allowing Amtrak trains to pass stopped MBTA trains. More immediately, portions of the station were in poor condition, with a 2012 report indicating that two sets of stairs were closed due to rust damage. Although the station had mini-high platforms for level boarding, certain accessible-required elements such as tactile platform edges were missing.

MBTA plans for a $4.9 million renovation, which would not have fixed the footbridge, were criticized by local officials in 2019. That November, $4 million for design of a more extensive renovation was approved by the MBTA Fiscal Management Board. The project will include full-length high-level platforms, a new footbridge with elevators, an improved bus stop, and changes to the parking lot. Design work began in April 2020 and was expected to last 18 months. Some repairs were considered to be made in the interim.

On February 26, 2021, the station was closed due to deterioration of the overpass. By March 2021, the reconstruction was expected to cost $48 million, of which only $7 million had been funded; the existing station was expected to reopen in April. However, in May 2021 the MBTA indicated that the station would remain closed until the reconstruction project was complete. Design reached 75% completion in September 2021 and 100% in April 2022. By January 2023, funding for the station had not yet been approved.

In July 2022, the MBTA indicated that the old footbridge would be removed that fall. Early construction was expected to last through February 2023. However, demolition work did not actually begin until April 17, 2023. Only a small portion was removed before work was paused "due to procedural issues". Demolition work resumed in late September and was completed on October 14.

A new Pawtucket/Central Falls station opened in January 2023. The MBTA reopened South Attleboro station with "limited peak-hour service" – three daily round trips using only the north platform – on May 20, 2024. Parking at the station was made free (versus the usual rate of $6 daily) from October 1, 2024, to April 1, 2025, in an attempt to attract ridership. The station averaged just 19 daily boardings in November 2024 versus 1,144 in October 2018. As of May 2025, plans for the larger renovation are "paused pending a funding strategy."

== Bus connections ==
South Attleboro station is served by four local bus routes, which stop at the Bristol Place shopping center just to the east: Greater Attleboro Taunton Regional Transit Authority (GATRA) routes 11 and 16, and Rhode Island Public Transit Authority (RIPTA) routes 1 and 35.

By federal law, bus systems like RIPTA that receive federal funds usually cannot cross state lines; thus, despite demand, RIPTA previously could not run directly to the station. In 2009, the agency considered building a $300,000 bus turnaround for the 77 (now 1) route just over the Rhode Island border. In 2013, RIPTA began a two-year-long systemwide reorganization; one specific objective of the project was to secure federal permission to run directly to South Attleboro. RIPTA extended routes 1 and 35 to Bristol Place in June 2014. GATRA service to Bristol Place was discontinued prior to 2012 due to low ridership, but resumed in 2015.
