= East Foxboro station =

Disused railway station in Massachusetts

East Foxboro
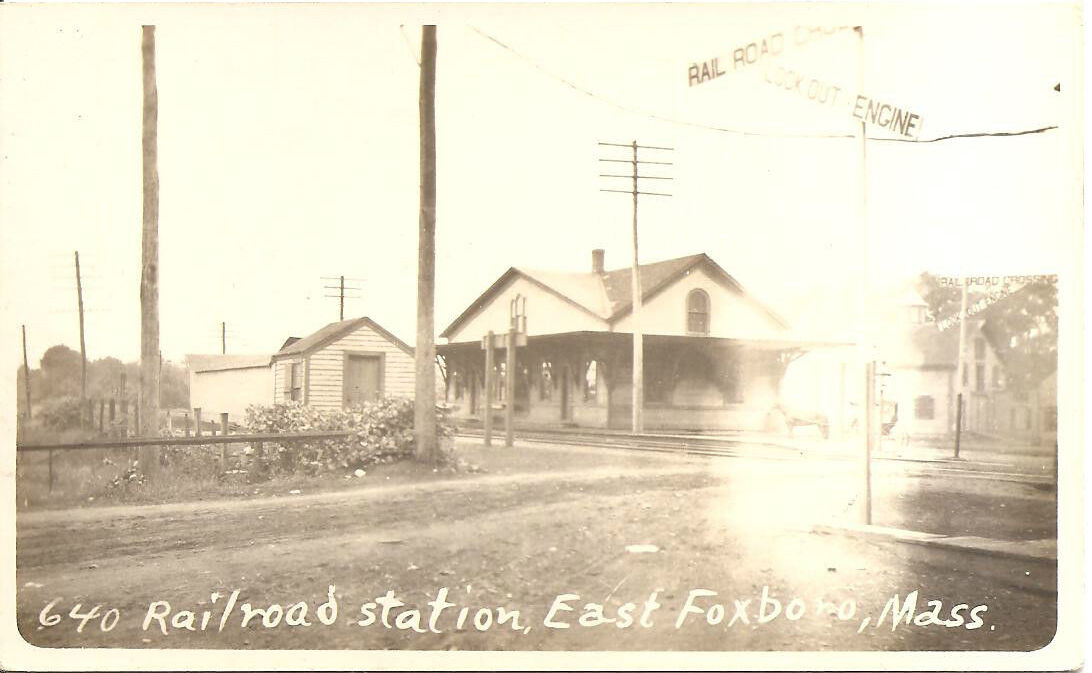
- Early-20th-century postcard of the station

General information
- Location: Community Way; Foxborough, Massachusetts
- Coordinates: 42.06214°N 71.20179°W
- Line: Attleboro Line (Northeast Corridor)
- Tracks: 2

History
- Closed: November 1977

Former services
Preceding station	MBTA	Following station
Mansfield toward Providence	Providence/Stoughton Line	Sharon toward South Station
Preceding station	New York, New Haven and Hartford Railroad	Following station
Mansfield toward New Haven	Shore Line	Sharon Heights toward Boston
Location

East Foxboro station was a commuter rail station on the Northeast Corridor in Foxborough, Massachusetts. It was originally built by the Boston and Providence Railroad, which became part of the Old Colony Railroad, and then finally the New York, New Haven and Hartford Railroad. It was closed due to low ridership in July 1938 as part of the 88 stations case. It reopened on March 11, 1940, after a state order that February. The station ultimately closed in November 1977 when the town of Foxborough declined to subsidize MBTA Commuter Rail service to the station.
