= Attleboro station (Massachusetts) =

Railway station in Attleboro, Massachusetts, US

Attleboro
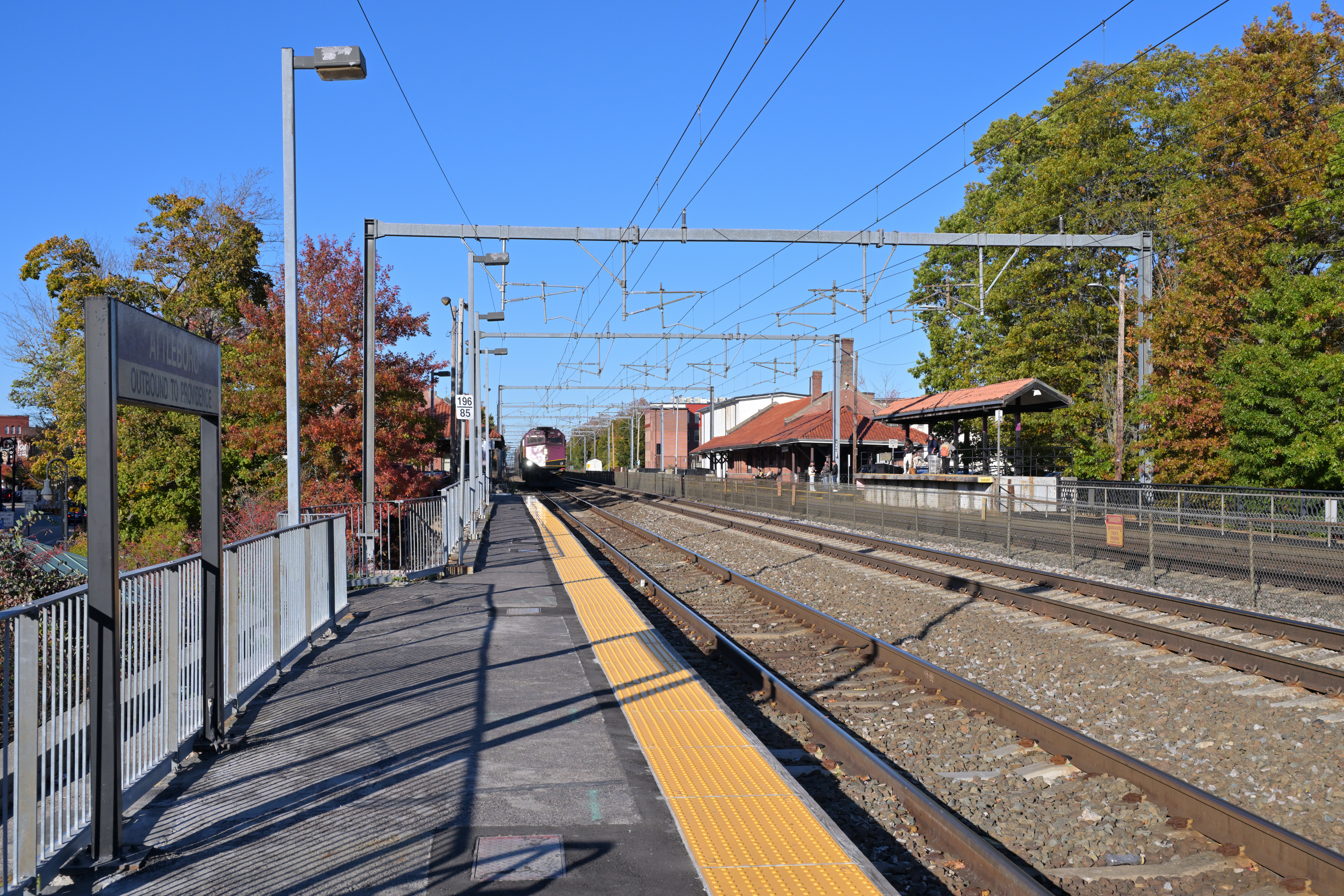
- Attleboro station in October 2025

General information
- Location: 75 South Main Street; Attleboro, Massachusetts
- Coordinates: 41.9413°N 71.2849°W
- Lines: Attleboro Line (Northeast Corridor); Attleboro Branch; Attleboro Branch (former)
- Platforms: 2 side platforms
- Tracks: 4
- Connections: GATRA: 10, 12, 15, 16, 18

Construction
- Parking: 796 spaces
- Cycle facilities: 28 spaces
- Accessible: Yes

Other information
- Fare zone: 7

History
- Opened: 1835
- Rebuilt: 1906–1908

Passengers
- 2024: 1,220 daily boardings

Services
Preceding station	MBTA	Following station
South Attleboro toward Wickford Junction	Providence/Stoughton Line	Mansfield toward South Station
South Attleboro toward Providence	Foxboro event service	Mansfield toward Foxboro
Former services
Preceding station	Amtrak	Following station
Providence toward New York	Cape Codder 1986–1989	Taunton toward Hyannis
Preceding station	Cape Cod and Hyannis Railroad	Following station
Terminus	Attleboro Branch (1988)	Taunton toward Hyannis or Falmouth
Preceding station	New York, New Haven and Hartford Railroad	Following station
Pawtucket-Central Falls toward New Haven	Shore Line	Mansfield toward Boston
Providence toward New York	Cape Codder	Taunton toward Hyannis or Woods Hole
- Northbound and Southbound Stations
- U.S. National Register of Historic Places
- Location: 1 and 3 Mill Street; Attleboro, Massachusetts
- Built: 1906
- Architect: Edward Hagel
- Architectural style: Richardsonian Romanesque
- NRHP reference No.: 88003128
- Added to NRHP: January 5, 1989
Location

Attleboro station is a commuter rail station on the MBTA's Providence/Stoughton Line located in Attleboro, Massachusetts. By a 2024 count, Attleboro had 1,220 daily riders, making it the third-busiest station on the system outside Boston.

Attleboro has had railroad service to its downtown area continuously since 1835. The two-story northbound and southbound station buildings, now private businesses, were built during a grade crossing elimination project in 1906-1908 and added to the National Register of Historic Places in 1989. MBTA trains stop at platforms located slightly south of the historic buildings.

Attleboro is an important transfer station for the Greater Attleboro Taunton Regional Transit Authority, with bus platforms at the adjacent Attleboro Intermodal Transportation Center.

== History ==
=== Early history ===
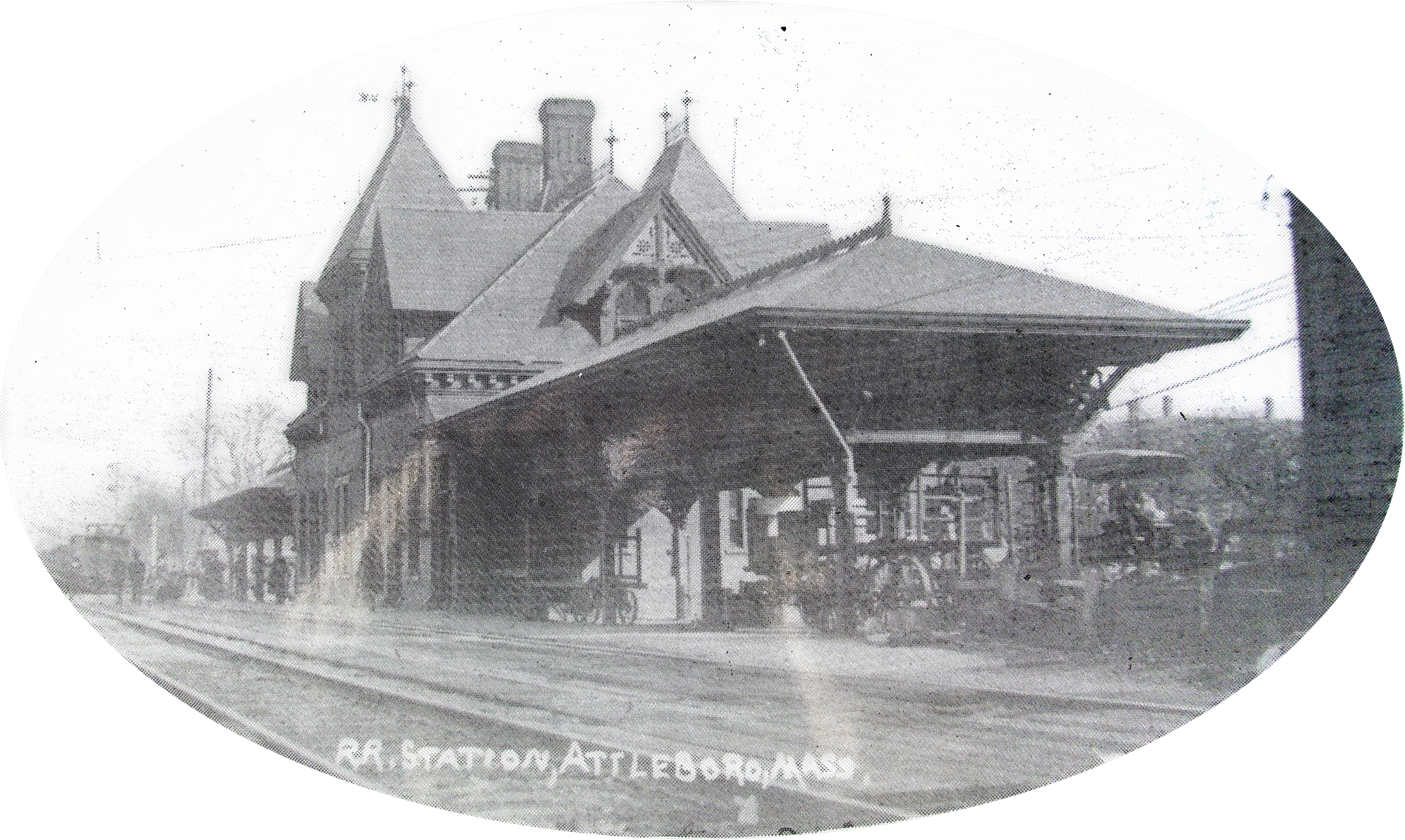
The 1873-built station in 1906

The Boston and Providence Railroad (B&P) opened between its namesake cities in June 1835. Two branches opened from Attleboro: The Attleboro Branch Railroad (run by the B&P) opened in January 1870, followed by the Taunton Branch Railroad's Attleboro Branch (to Taunton) on August 1, 1871. The B&P built a new station in 1873. Originally intended to be a joint project with the Taunton Branch Railroad, it was completed solely by the B&P. It was a complex Victorian Gothic building – north of Mill Street at a grade crossing. Service began in June 1835 from Boston to Providence.

The B&P was taken over by the Old Colony Railroad in 1888, which itself was absorbed by the New York, New Haven and Hartford Railroad in 1893. The Old Colony Railroad constructed a new freight house at Attleboro in 1891. The lease of the Attleboro Branch Railroad expired in 1901; the New Haven built a different connector to the Walpole and Wrentham Railroad and the branch was returned to its owners. It was converted to an interurban trolley line locally known as the "Gee Whiz Line" in June 1903. Taken over by the Rhode Island Company in 1907, service lasted as long as 1932. The town plans to convert part of the right of way into a recreational trail.

=== New station ===
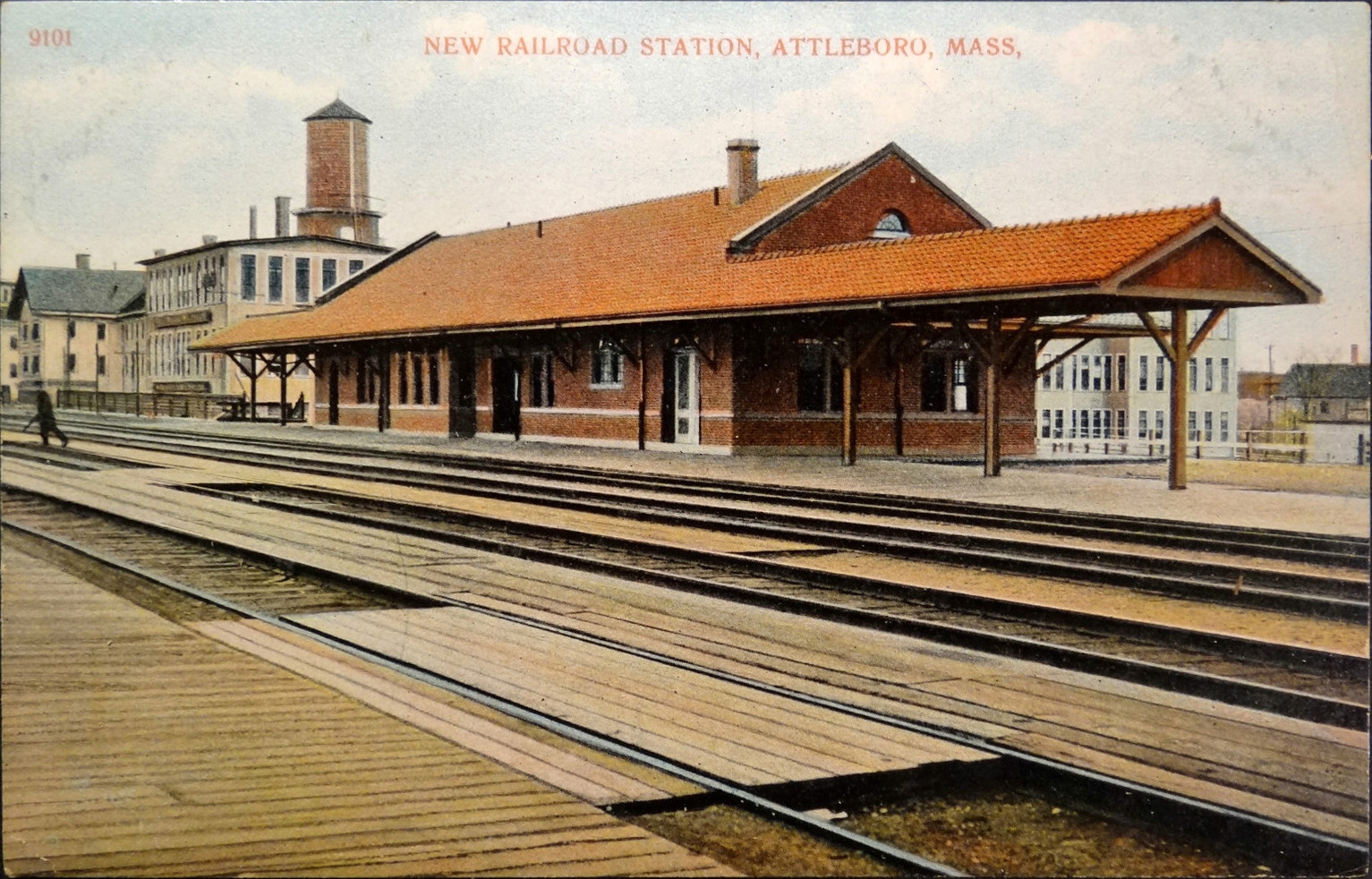
Early postcard of the northbound building

In 1891, the town petitioned the New Haven Railroad to eliminate dangerous grade crossings in the town. In 1905, the railroad set out to construct a lengthy viaduct for the mainline and the branch to Taunton. The project removed 13 grade crossings and made the line four tracks through Attleboro - one of the few locations east of New Haven where the railroad completed quadruple-tracking plans. Two-story Romanesque station buildings were built on both sides; the northbound building opened in 1906 and the larger southbound building two years later.

Service on the branch to Taunton lasted until 1958, with summer-only long-distance service to Cape Cod lasting until 1964. In April 1979, off-peak MBTA service to Providence was cut back to Attleboro due to a reduction in subsidy from the state of Rhode Island. All service was cut to Attleboro on February 20, 1981.

=== MBTA era ===
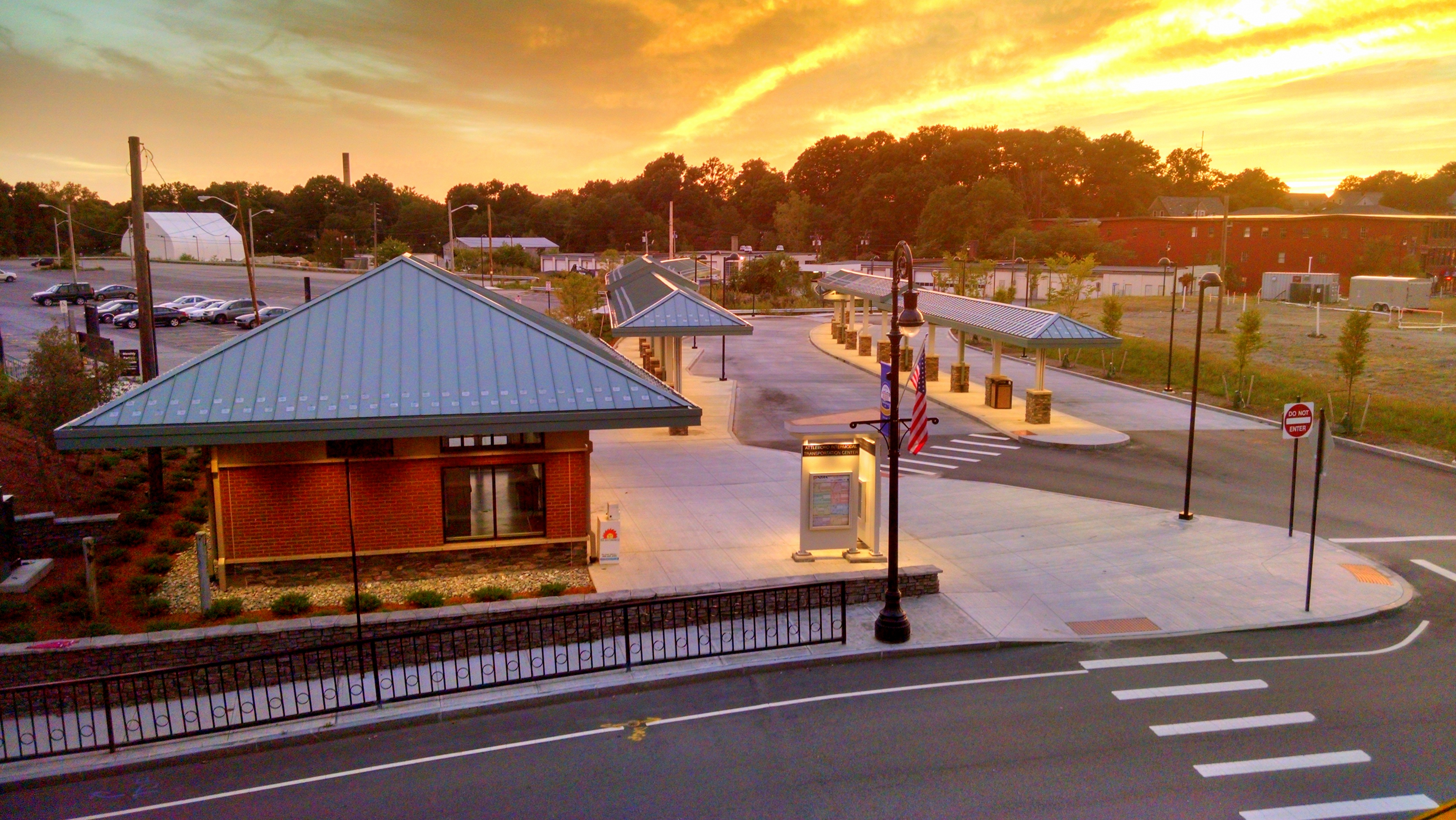
Attleboro Intermodal Transportation Center viewed from the southbound MBTA platforms

The station served Amtrak's Cape Codder during the summers of 1986 to 1988, with the Cape Cod and Hyannis Railroad operating additional state-funded service from Attleboro to Hyannis in 1988. The CC&HR stopped operation after the 1988 season due to elimination of state subsidies. The Cape Codder discontinued its Attleboro stop in 1989 as it served just 3 riders per train, though the service ran until 1996.

Rush hour MBTA service was restored to Providence on February 1, 1988. Off-peak and weekend service was extended to South Attleboro upon its opening on June 20, 1990; those trains were later extended to Providence under expanded funding agreements. On January 5, 1989, the station buildings were added to the National Register of Historic Places. Both buildings are owned by private businesses. On January 16, 1989, the MBTA began a $990k renovation project, which included the installation of mini-high platforms to make the station accessible. The station was accessible by late 1990. The MBTA began operating Providence–Foxboro service for events at Gillette Stadium in 1997, with Attleboro as one of the intermediate stops.

A 782-space garage was planned around 1999 to deal with overcrowding in the surface parking lots, but was never built. The Attleboro Intermodal Transportation Center was opened on November 7, 2013 to provide better connections between local bus and commuter rail services. The facility includes dedicated busways and a waiting room located on the west side of the railroad viaduct.

A 1.7 miles (2.7 km) section of non-electrified platform sidings at Attleboro, not included in the initial Amtrak electrification, was scheduled to be electrified in mid-2022 to support future electric MBTA operations; however, this did not occur. As of 2024, transit oriented development with up to 600 housing units is planned to replace the surface parking lots west of the station. The city and the MBTA issued a request for qualifications in June 2024. Portions of the outbound platform were reconstructed beginning in April 2025.

== See also ==
- National Register of Historic Places listings in Bristol County, Massachusetts
