= Foxboro station =

Train station in Foxborough, Massachusetts, US

Foxboro Station
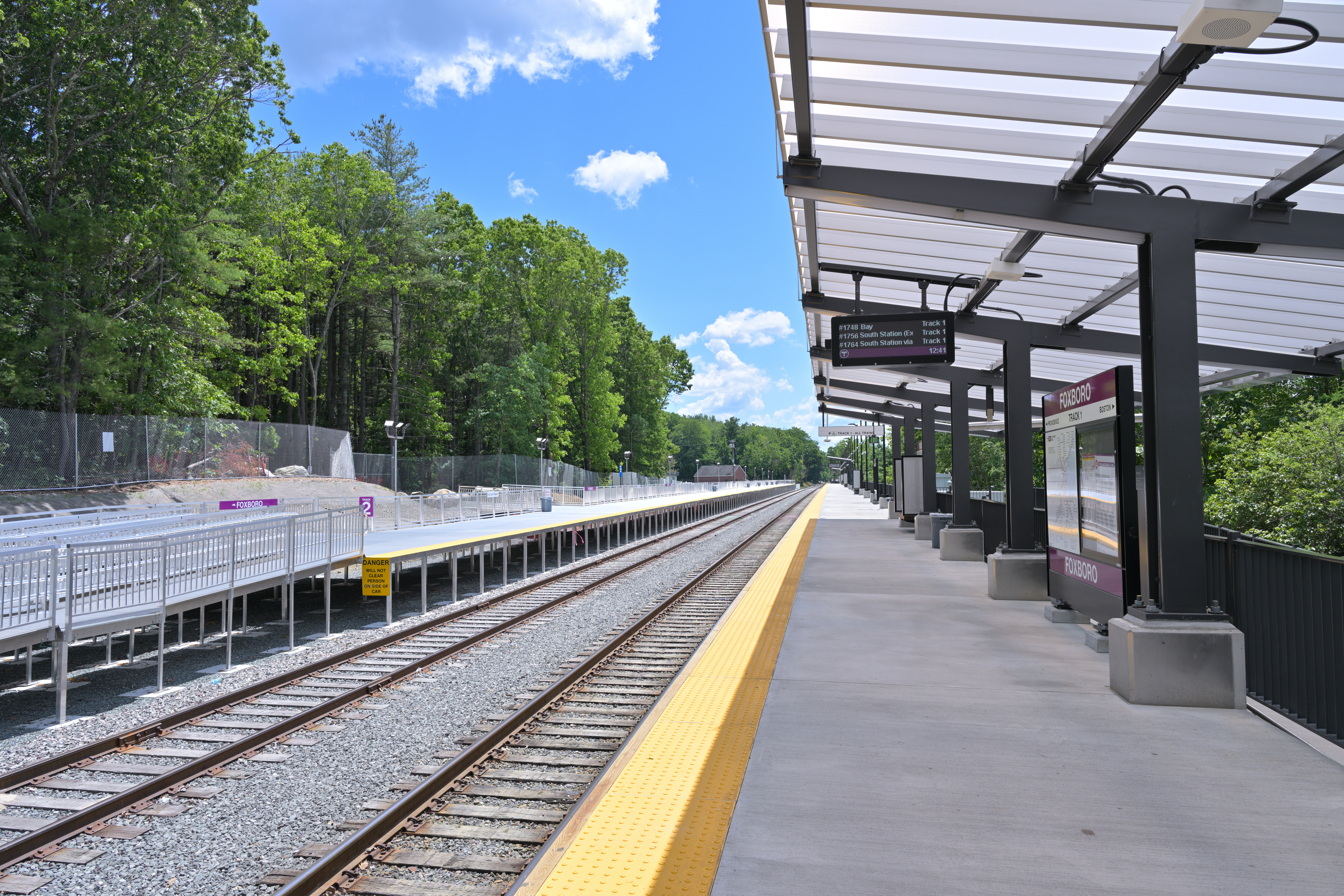
- Foxboro station in June 2026

General information
- Location: Patriot Place near U.S. Route 1 Foxborough, Massachusetts
- Coordinates: 42.0950°N 71.2615°W
- Line: Framingham Secondary
- Platforms: 1 side platform
- Tracks: 2

Construction
- Accessible: Yes

Other information
- Fare zone: 4

History
- Opened: August 15, 1971 (event service); October 21, 2019 (regular service)

Passengers
- 2024: 150 daily boardings

Services
Preceding station	MBTA	Following station
Terminus	Franklin/Foxboro Line	Windsor Gardens toward South Station
Terminus	Foxboro event service	Dedham Corporate Center toward South Station
Mansfield toward Providence	Foxboro event service	Terminus
Location

Foxboro station is an MBTA Commuter Rail station in Foxborough, Massachusetts, located adjacent to Gillette Stadium and the Patriot Place shopping center. The station has a single accessible side platform serving the main track of the Framingham Secondary. It is the terminus of a branch of the Franklin/Foxboro Line service, and is served by trains from Boston via the Franklin/Foxboro Line and from Providence via the Providence/Stoughton Line (Northeast Corridor) during events at Gillette Stadium.

Previous passenger service on the line ran from 1870 to 1933, with several stations in Foxborough. Special service for New England Patriots games and other stadium events ran from 1971 to 1973, then resumed in 1986. Regular weekday service to the station via the Franklin Line was studied in 2010 and proposed in 2014. A pilot program of service was announced in 2017, and ten daily round trips began operation in October 2019. The pilot was suspended in November 2020, but four midday round trips resumed on May 23, 2022. A new one-year pilot began on September 12, 2022, and was made permanent in October 2023. The station was modified in 2025–2026 with a permanent full-length high-level platform plus a temporary second platform to support service for the 2026 FIFA World Cup.

== Station design ==
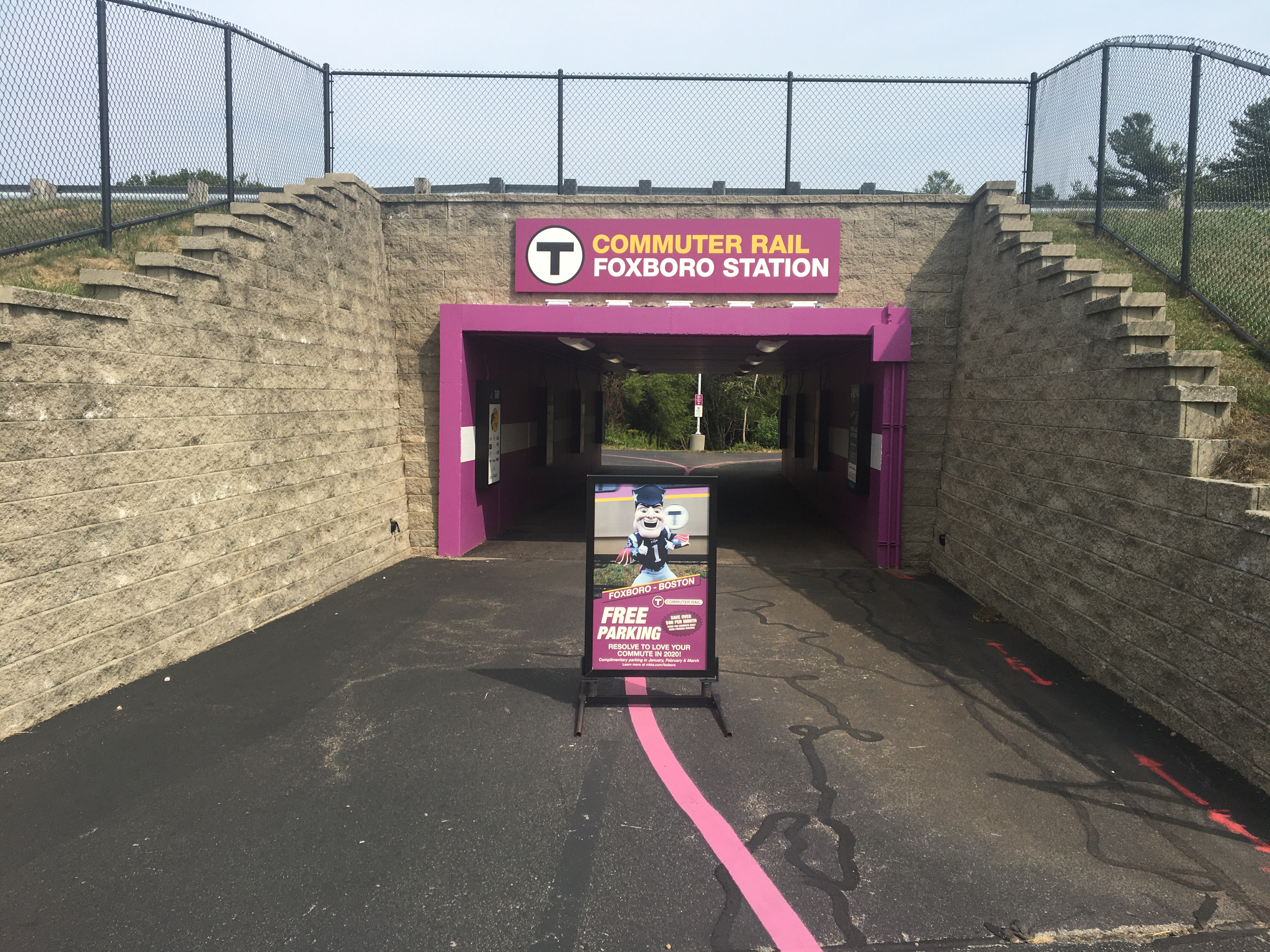
The underpass leading to the station

Foxboro station is located in the northern part of Foxboro, adjacent to the Gillette Stadium sports complex and Patriot Place shopping center. It is on the far east side of the site, and is separated from the rest of the complex by the Neponset River. A pedestrian walkway from the station runs under an access road and to the north end of the stadium. The station has an 800-foot (240 m)-long accessible high-level side platform on the west side of the main track of the Framingham Secondary. A freight passing siding is located on the east side of the main track; a temporary platform can be installed to serve that track.

Weekday trains run between Foxboro and Boston's South Station via the Franklin Branch, connecting to the Franklin Branch at Walpole and serving local stops. Event trains serving South Station run via the Franklin Branch, with intermediate stops only at Back Bay and Dedham Corporate Center. Event trains serving Providence station in Providence, Rhode Island run via the Northeast Corridor (Providence/Stoughton Line), with intermediate stops at South Attleboro, Attleboro, and Mansfield.

== History ==
=== Previous stations ===
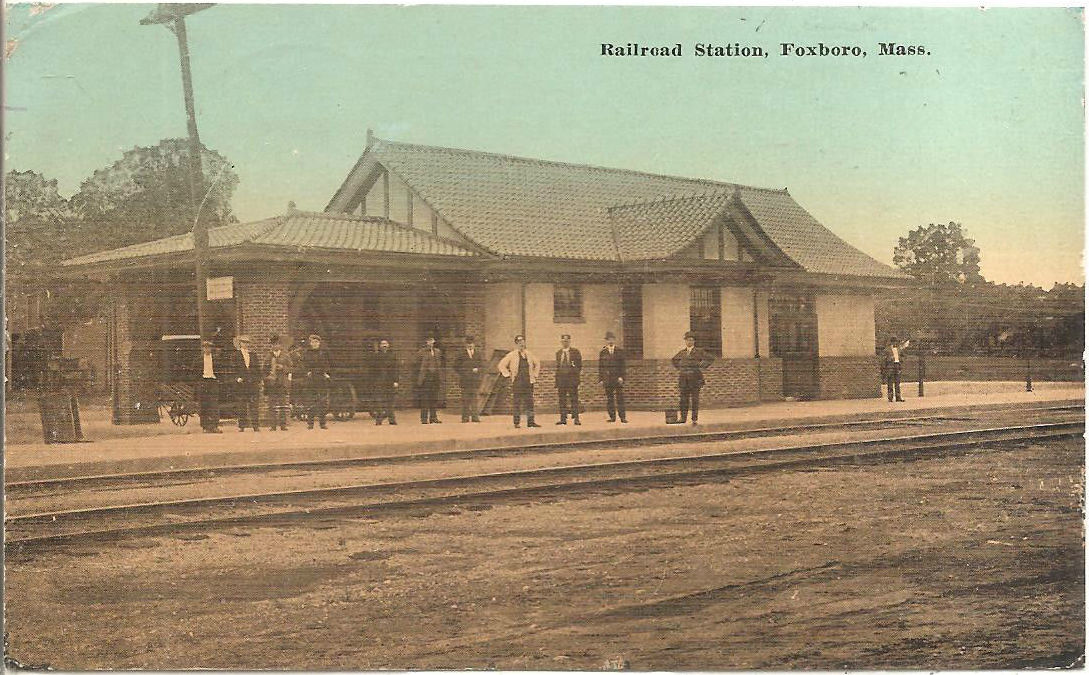
Postcard view of the second Foxboro station

The Mansfield and Framingham Railroad opened between its namesake towns in 1870 and was immediately leased to the Boston, Clinton and Fitchburg Railroad (later the Boston, Clinton, Fitchburg and New Bedford Railroad). In 1879, it became part of the Old Colony Railroad, which was in turn acquired by the New York, New Haven and Hartford Railroad in 1893. There were three stations on the line in Foxborough – Foxvale at Spring Street, Foxboro at Bird Street, and North Foxboro at North Street – plus South Walpole at Summer Street just over the Walpole border.

The original Foxboro station, a three-story structure with a Mansard roof, was a converted coffin shop. A two-story brick station with a Spanish-style roof was constructed in 1911. South Walpole station burned on February 23, 1911, due to a defective chimney, and was soon rebuilt. The lightly used North Foxboro and Foxvale stations were closed in 1928. Remaining passenger service on the line – a single daily round trip between Taunton and Framingham – ended in 1933.

The line remained in use for freight service, passing to Penn Central in 1969 and Conrail in 1976. Special trains were operated to the opening of the Bay State Raceway in 1948. None of the three Foxborough station buildings survive, though the former South Walpole station remains in use as a post office.

=== MBTA event service ===
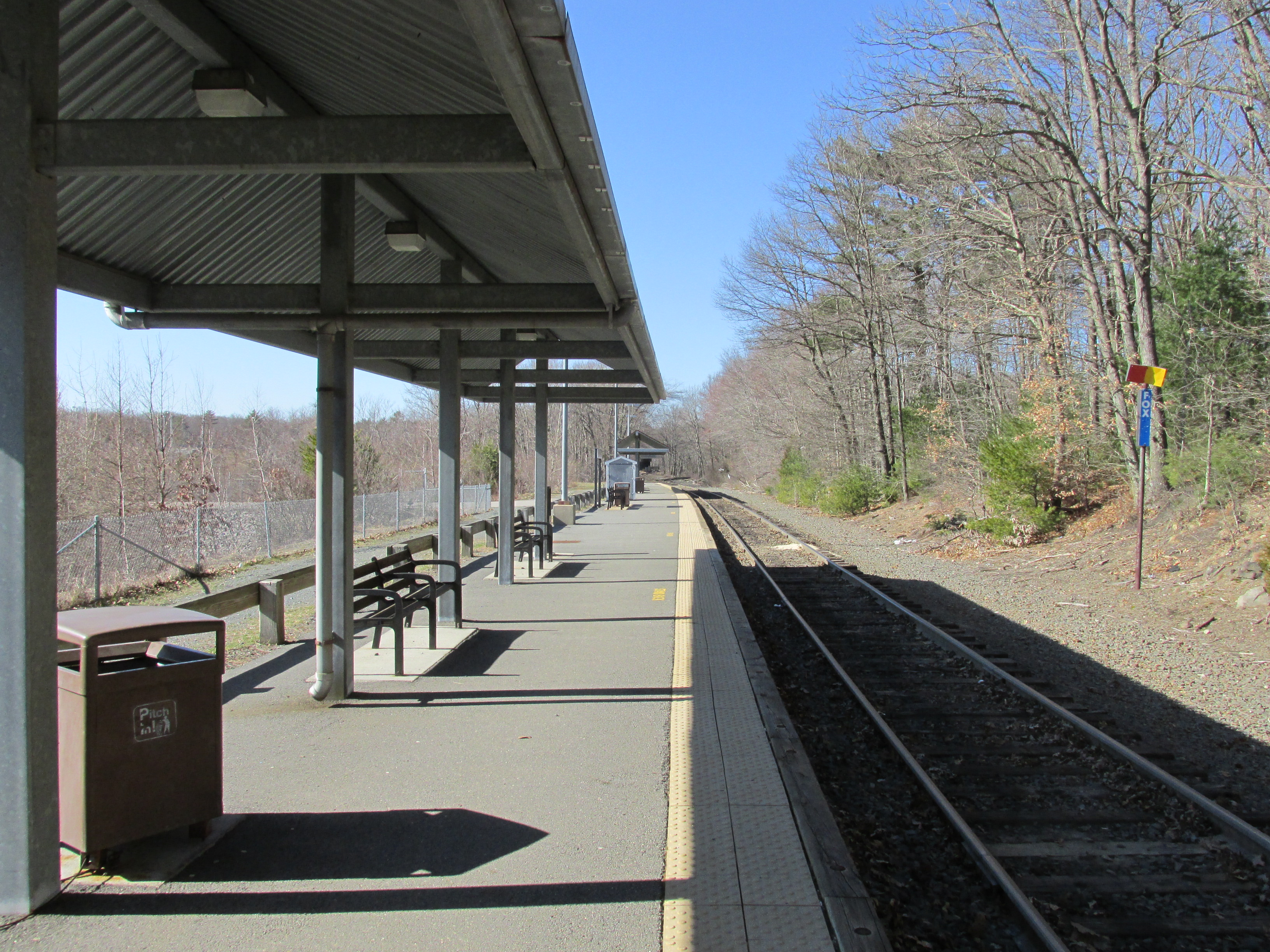
Foxboro station in 2013

The service started with the opening of Schaefer Stadium (later Sullivan Stadium, then Foxboro Stadium) on August 15, 1971, with trains from Boston and Providence. Providence service ended early in the 1973 season due to low ridership; Boston service ended that October. Plans were made to resume Boston service for the 1982 season, but this was interrupted by a railroad strike and an NFL strike. Boston–Foxboro service via the Franklin Line ultimately resumed with the 1986 season. Beginning with the 1989 season, it was moved to the Providence/Stoughton Line, with a reverse move at Mansfield and intermediate stops at Back Bay, Hyde Park (dropped by 1993), Route 128, Canton Junction, Sharon, and Mansfield.

Boston service was shifted back to the Franklin Line in 1995, with stops at Dedham Corporate Center and Norwood Central. An accessible mini-high platform was added by 1996. Providence service resumed for the 1997 season, with intermediate stops at South Attleboro, Attleboro, and Mansfield. MBTA-organized privately operated bus service also ran from Alewife, Forest Hills (1994 only), Quincy Adams, and Riverside to Foxboro Stadium for the 1994 to 1999 seasons. Foxboro Stadium was replaced with the adjacent Gillette Stadium in 2002. By 2005, ridership per event averaged 1,567. The Norwood Central stop was dropped in 2011. Providence trains were extended to T.F. Green Airport in Warwick, Rhode Island from 2012 to 2018. The MBTA began operating two Boston trains for some Patriots home games in 2025.

=== Weekday service ===
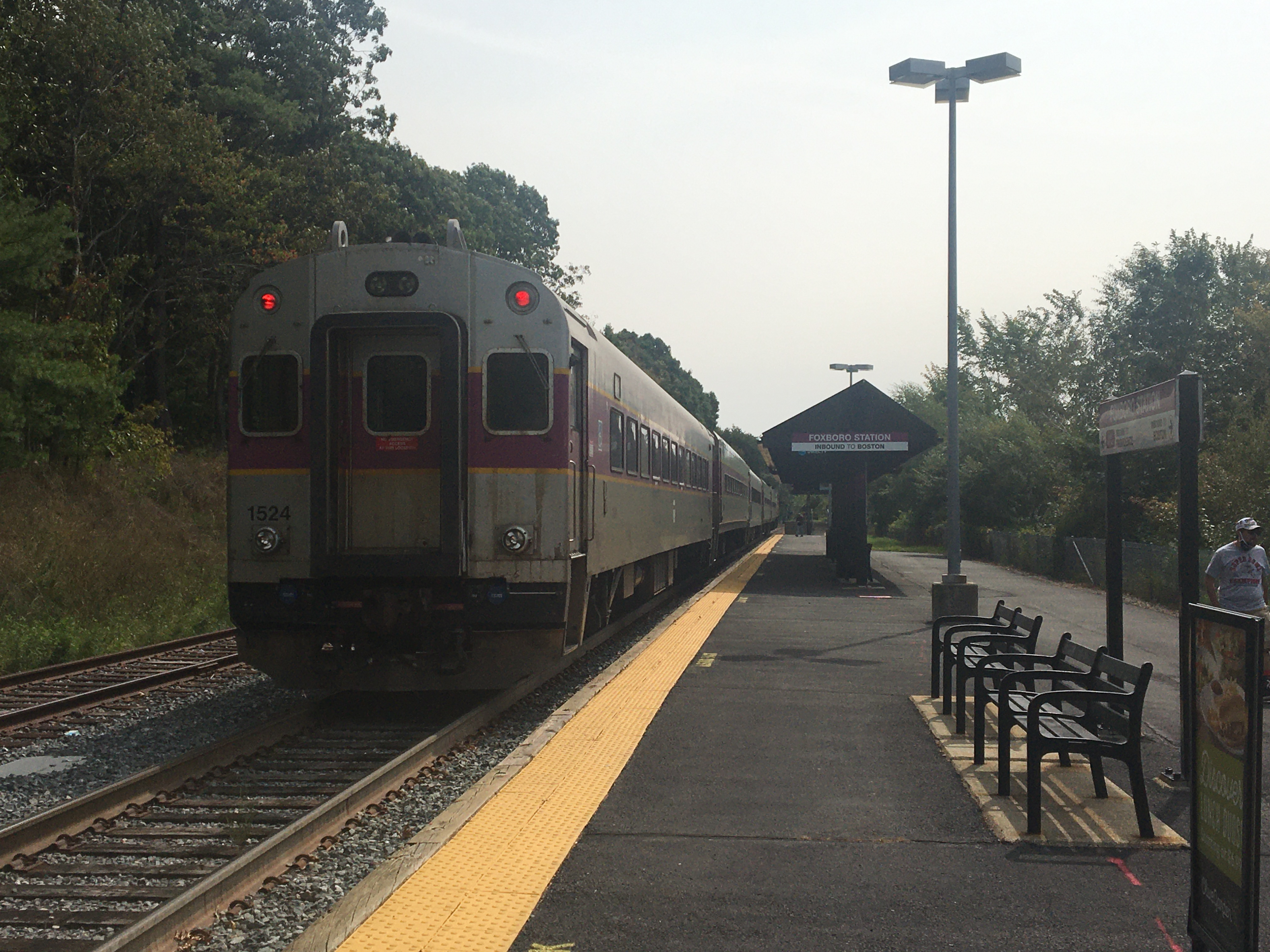
A train at Foxboro station in 2020

In September 2010, the MBTA completed a study to determine the feasibility of extending full-time commuter rail service to Foxboro via the Franklin Line. The study looked at extending some Fairmount Line service to Foxboro, running shuttle trains from Foxboro to Walpole, or a combination of both. The options with through service to Boston were to include the addition of a second track at Foxboro station, converting it to an island platform.

In January 2014, the state began discussions with stadium owner Kraft Group for use of the stadium parking lots. The MassDOT Board authorized the purchase of the Framingham Subdivision from CSX that June. By November 2014, the MBTA planned to run five daily Boston–Foxboro round trips, but town officials objected to the plans being made without local input. The $23 million purchase of the line was completed in June 2015, making it the Framingham Secondary.

In February 2017, Kraft Group owner Robert Kraft agreed to subsidize the costs of a pilot service up to $200,000 per year, with 500 parking spaces made available. The pilot was supported by Foxborough officials, but opposed by Walpole officials. In August 2017, the MBTA Board approved an 11-month pilot program of service to Foxboro, planned to begin in late 2018 or early 2019. Daily ridership was expected to be 210 passengers, with the majority diverted from other commuter rail stations. Most of the pilot service would be extended Fairmount Line trains, which prompted concerns that the pilot would increase crowding and decrease reliability on the Fairmount Line.

In November 2017, the MBTA indicated that service would begin on May 20, 2019. About 4.3 miles (6.9 km) of track between Walpole and south of Foxboro station was upgraded in preparation for the service. A freight passing track was added at the station, and the section from Walpole to Foxboro was signalized.

After an additional delay, pilot service began on October 21, 2019. Initial service was ten daily round trips, including both peak and midday trips. Seven of the ten round trips were extended Fairmount Line trains. By December 2019, the pilot averaged 70 daily boardings at Foxboro – just one-third of the projected ridership. On November 2, 2020, the pilot was suspended due to reduced ridership as a result of the COVID-19 pandemic; it was then expected to resume in spring 2021. Four midday Foxboro round trips – but no peak Foxboro service – ultimately resumed on May 23, 2022. A new one-year Foxboro pilot began on September 12, 2022, with 10 1/2 Boston–Foxboro round trips on weekdays. The service was made permanent effective October 2, 2023, with the service renamed as the Franklin/Foxboro Line. Foxboro station averaged 112–133 daily boardings by that time.

=== Renovations ===
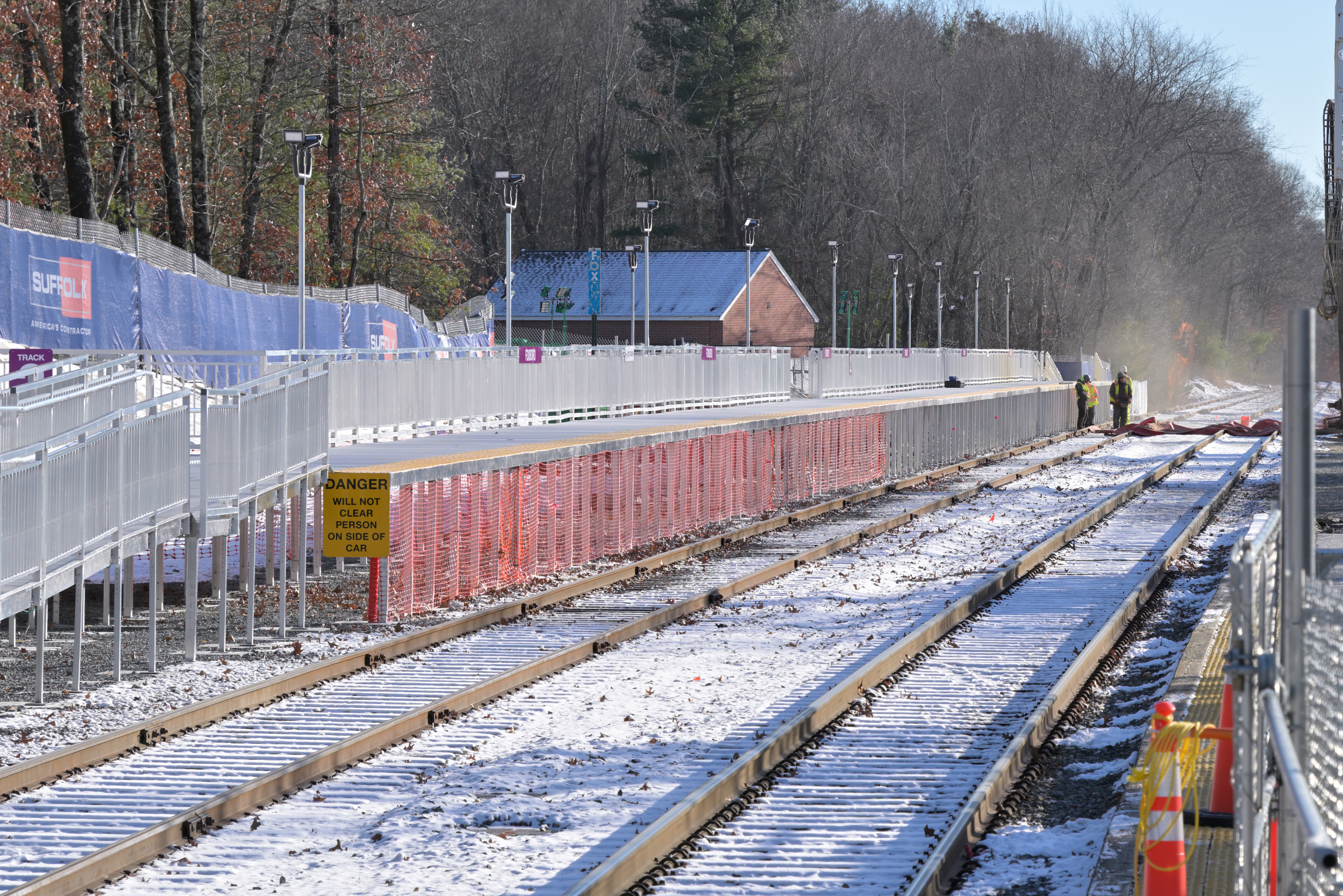
The temporary high level platform

The MBTA and the Kraft Group indicated in October 2023 that they would attempt to find new funding to construct a full-length high-level platform at Foxboro. (That project was not scheduled for funding by the MBTA Capital Investment Plan). In May 2025, the MBTA indicated plans to expand the station for the 2026 FIFA World Cup, which includes several matches at Gillette Stadium in mid-2026. The existing platform was rebuilt as a permanent 800-foot (240 m)-long high-level platform, while a temporary 600-foot (180 m)-long high-level platform was placed across the tracks. The MBTA expected to carry 20,000 riders to each match. Construction began in August 2025, with midday Foxboro service cancelled beginning on August 11. The temporary platform was ready for use for a Patriots game on December 1, 2025. A ribbon-cutting ceremony for the renovated station was held on June 2, 2026, one day after midday service resumed. The project cost $35 million, of which at least $5 million was paid by Kraft.

An investigation by the Massachusetts Attorney General's office found that the procurement process for the renovations violated state procurement laws. The project needed to be completed by June 2026 in time for the World Cup; to speed up the project, the MBTA contracted part of the project out to Suffolk Construction Company as a $14.9 million change order to an unrelated renovation project at Symphony station that Suffolk was already working on. The Attorney General's office found that the Foxboro project should have been put out for bid separately, and that the circumvention of this public bid requirement was unlawful. However, Suffolk was allowed to continue work on the project due to public interest in the work being completed on time.
