= Mansfield station (MBTA) =

Rail station in Mansfield, Massachusetts, US

Mansfield
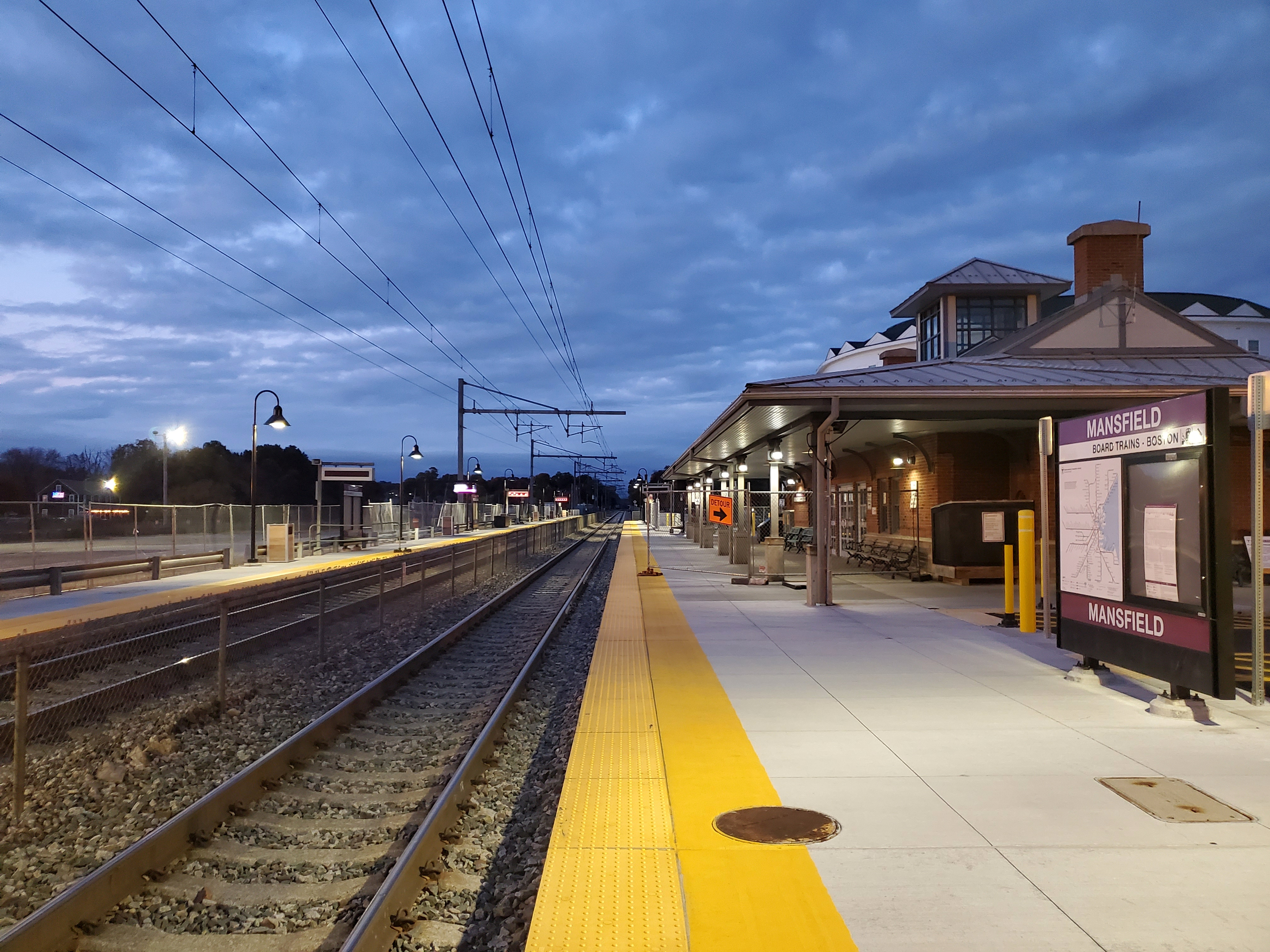
- Mansfield station in October 2020

General information
- Location: 1 Crocker Street; Mansfield, Massachusetts
- Coordinates: 42.03251°N 71.22007°W
- Line: Attleboro Line (Northeast Corridor)
- Platforms: 2 side platforms
- Tracks: 2

Construction
- Parking: 806 spaces ($4.00 fee)
- Cycle facilities: 12 spaces
- Accessible: Yes

Other information
- Fare zone: 6

History
- Opened: 1835
- Rebuilt: 1955, January 2004, 2017–2019

Passengers
- 2024: 1,143 daily boardings

Services
Preceding station	MBTA	Following station
Attleboro toward Wickford Junction	Providence/Stoughton Line	Sharon toward South Station
Attleboro toward Providence	Foxboro event service	Foxboro Terminus
Former services
Preceding station	MBTA	Following station
Foxboro Terminus	Foxboro event service 1989–1994	Sharon toward South Station
Preceding station	New York, New Haven and Hartford Railroad	Following station
Attleboro toward New Haven	Shore Line	East Foxboro toward Boston
Location

Mansfield station is an MBTA Commuter Rail station in Mansfield, Massachusetts. Located in downtown Mansfield, it serves the Providence/Stoughton Line. With 1,143 weekday boardings in a 2024 count, Mansfield is the fourth-busiest station in the system outside Boston.

With mini-high platforms on both tracks, Mansfield is fully accessible. Large parking lots are available west of the tracks, with limited parking including accessible spots next to the station building east of the tracks.

== History ==
=== Early stations ===
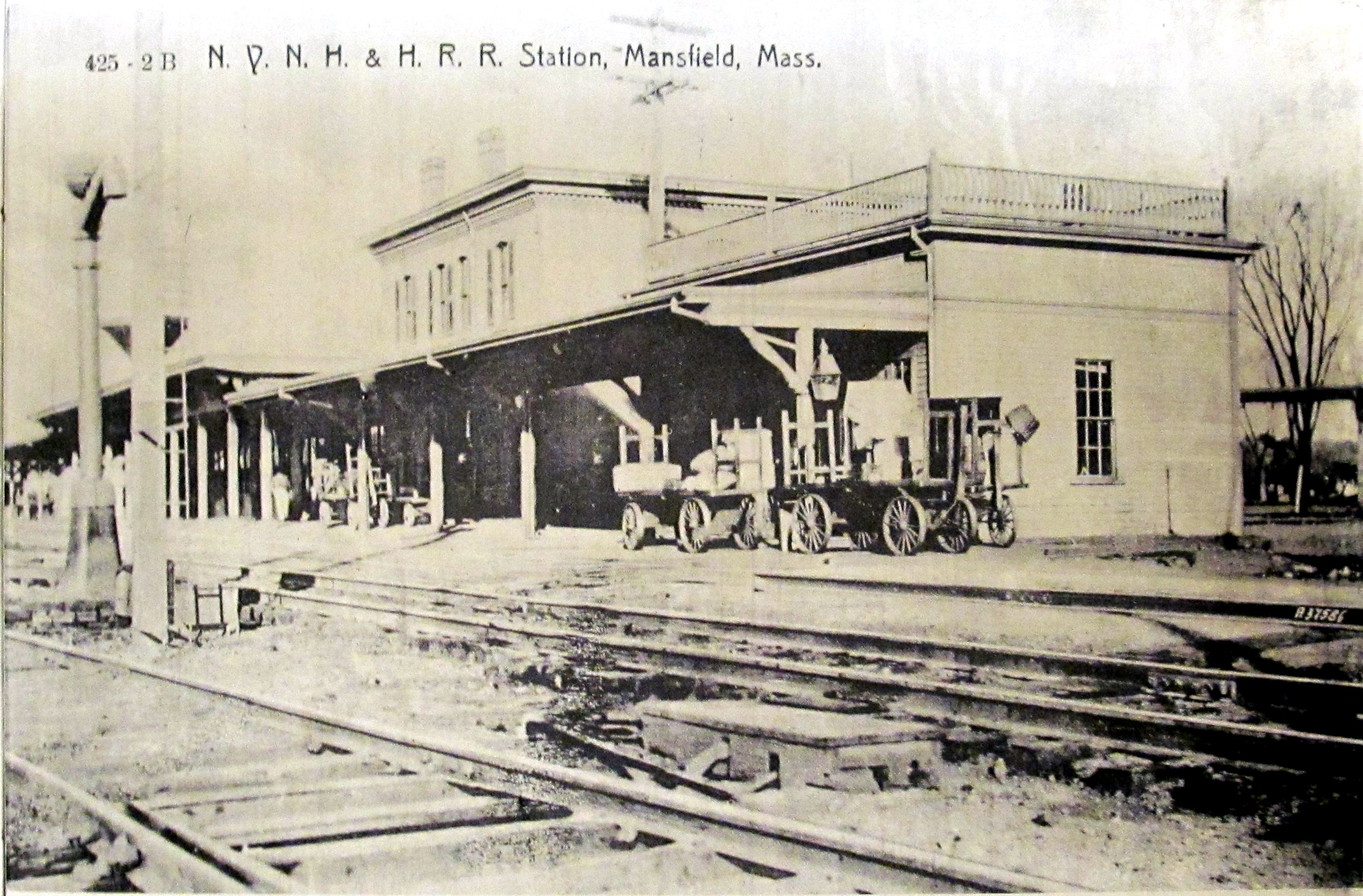
1908 view of the station

The Boston and Providence Railroad (B&P) opened through Mansfield in 1835, with a flat-roofed depot built near the modern station site. The Taunton Branch Railroad opened the next year; through cars operated to New Bedford soon after the New Bedford and Taunton Railroad opened in 1840, though the service was not suitable for commuters until 1885. The B&P carhouse at Mansfield was destroyed by a storm in September 1869 and rebuilt later that year. The Mansfield and Framingham Railroad opened in 1870 as part of the Boston, Clinton and Fitchburg Railroad; it was merged into the Boston, Clinton, Fitchburg and New Bedford Railroad in 1876 which itself became part of the Old Colony Railroad system in 1883 as the Old Colony's entrance to northern Massachusetts.

Mansfield became a short turn point for some B&P trains in 1885. The Old Colony acquired the B&P in 1888 and subsequently increased Mansfield - New Bedford service which connected with trains to Boston at Mansfield. The Old Colony was absorbed by the New York, New Haven and Hartford Railroad in 1893, unifying rail service in southeastern Massachusetts under the single operator. After South Station opened in 1899, both Taunton and New Bedford service operated as through trains to Boston via Mansfield. Service to the South Coast began running more often via Stoughton after 1918, and most branch line service via Mansfield except a handful of Taunton locals was cut by 1927.

=== Declining service ===
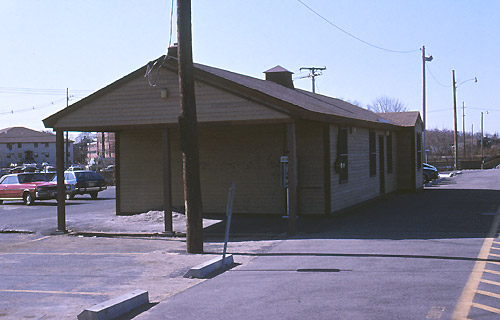
The 1955-built "temporary" station in 1985

Service to Framingham ended in 1933. South Coast service was switched back to via Mansfield in 1937 though New Bedford service was once again changed to via Stoughton in 1950. In 1955, the New Haven Railroad raised the tracks through Mansfield to eliminate grade crossings; the branch to Taunton was severed and all South Coast service ran via Stoughton until it was cut three years later. A 'temporary' wooden station was built, which became permanent as the New Haven fell into financial crises.

Mansfield was briefly served by a small number of Amtrak intercity trains around 1972.

=== MBTA era ===
The MBTA began funding service to Mansfield in August 1971. The same month, game-day service from Boston and Providence to Foxboro station at the New England Patriots' newly opened Schaefer Stadium was introduced. Those services were discontinued in 1973. Boston–Foxboro service via the Franklin Line resumed in 1986. It was rerouted over the Providence/Stoughton Line in 1989 with Mansfield as an intermediate stop. A reverse move was made at Mansfield to access the Framingham Secondary. Boston–Foxboro service was rerouted over the Franklin Line in 1995. Providence–Foxboro event service resumed in 1997, with intermediate stops including Mansfield.

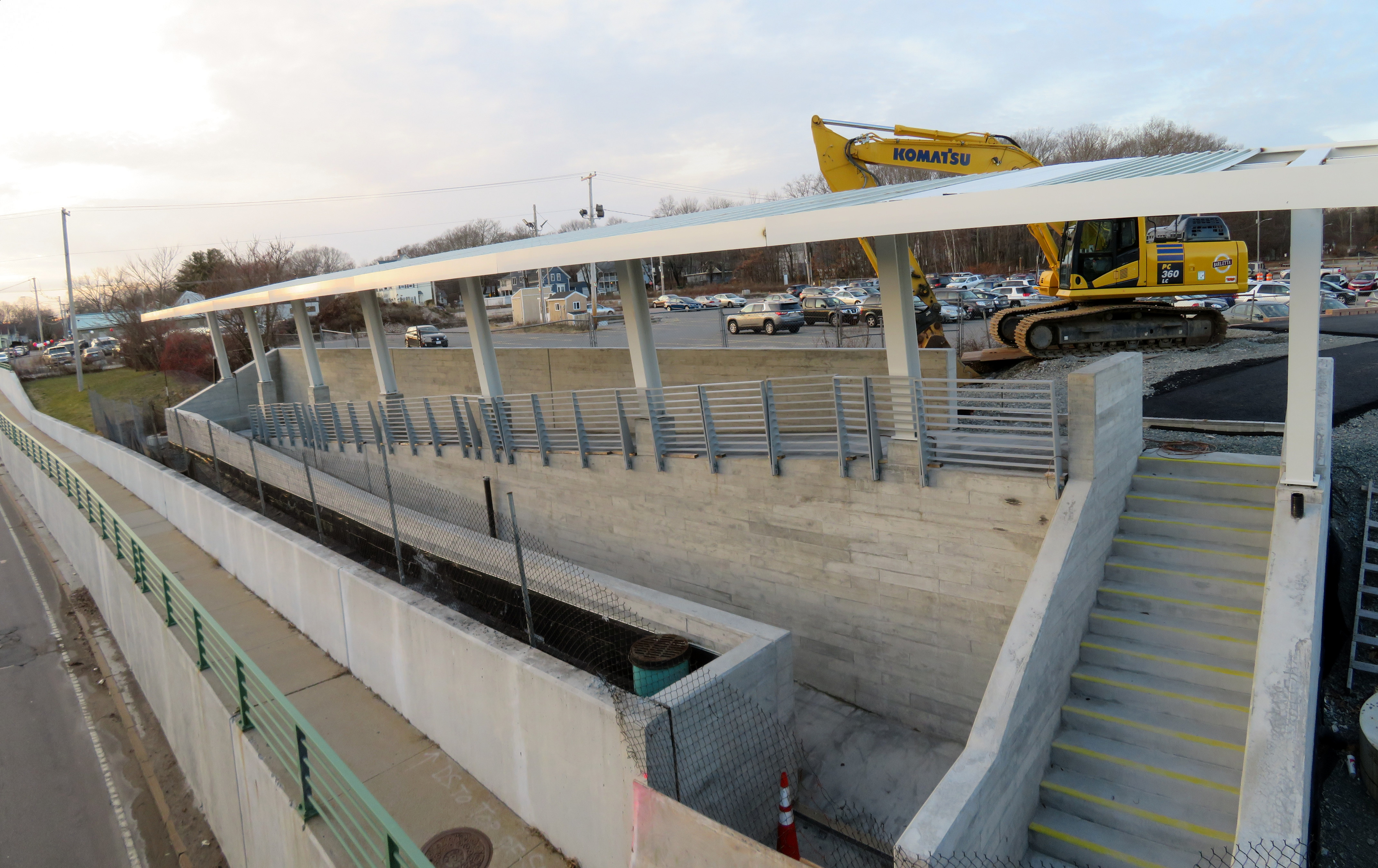
Ramp structure under construction in December 2018

In mid-2002, the town of Mansfield began a $1.5 million project to replace the derelict 1955 station. The new brick station opened in January 2004; it also serves as a town meeting hall for community functions. A doubling of the parking lot size to around 1,700 spaces was initially planned as part of the project.

Mansfield is located on a straight section of the Northeast Corridor where the Acela Express is permitted to travel at 150 mph (240 km/h). A fence is located between the tracks to prevent passengers from crossing, due to the danger from high-speed trains. On March 2, 2016, a crossing passenger was struck and killed by a northbound Northeast Regional. The station was closed through the next day because hazardous materials workers had to clean the site because of the high speed of the collision. Another illegally crossing passenger was struck and killed by a Northeast Regional train on September 22, 2016 - the ninth fatality involving a train in Mansfield in less than a decade.

A construction project from 2017 to 2022 improved accessibility at Mansfield station. The project includes replacement of the mini-high platforms, better signage, new ramps and stairs between the platforms and to Route 106, better lighting, improved guardrails, and full paving of all parking lots. Construction began in June 2017. A temporary inbound mini-high platform opened that December, with a similar temporary platform also added on the outbound side. In July 2018, estimated completion was delayed until December 2019 after it was discovered that the ramps would not meet code. The new ramps and stairs opened on March 6, 2020, followed by the outbound mini-high platform on April 27 and the inbound mini-high platform on May 4. Final punch list items lasted into March 2022.
