= Sharon station =

Railway station in Sharon, Massachusetts, US

Sharon
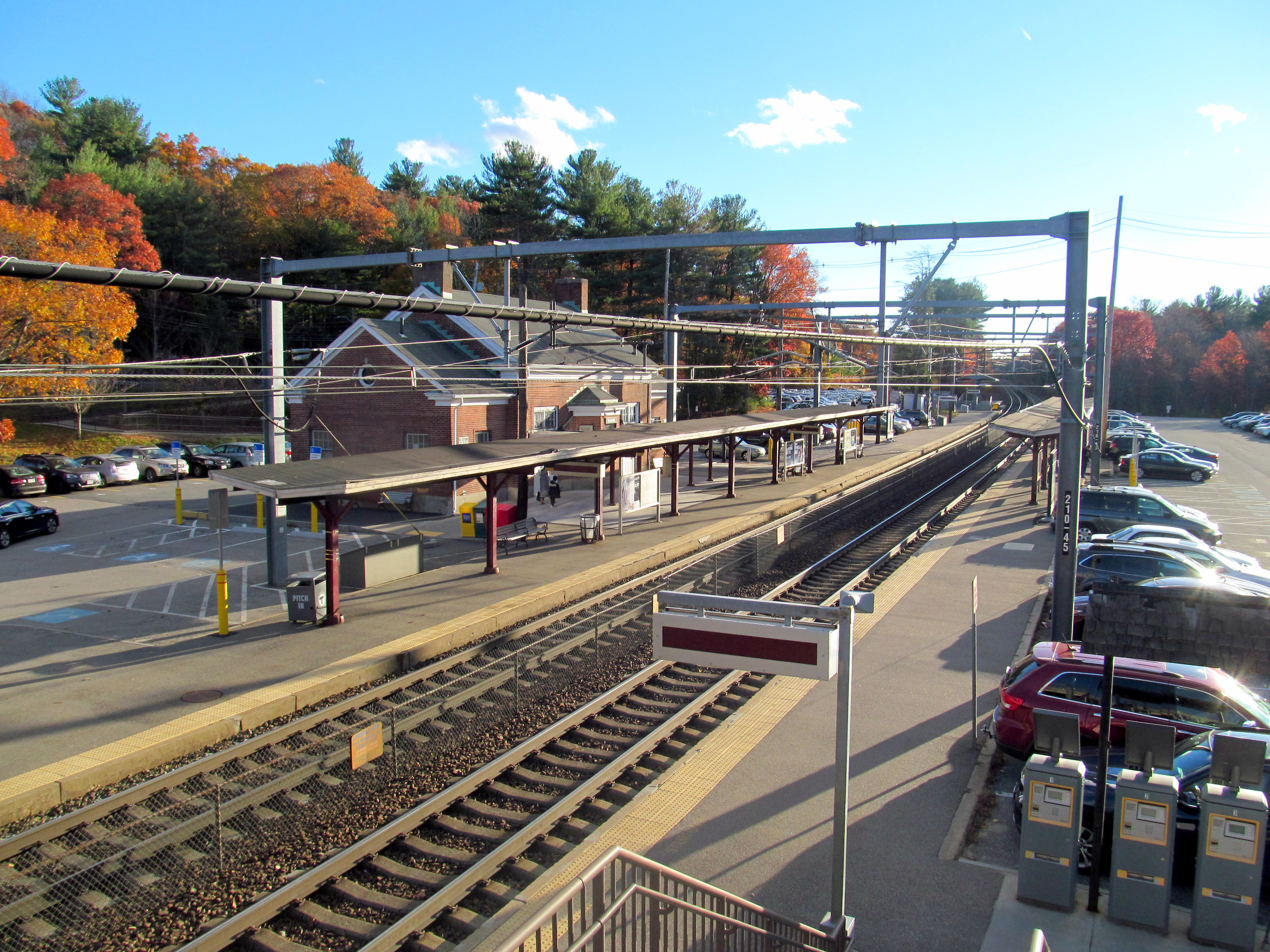
- Platforms and depot building at Sharon in November 2016

General information
- Location: 1 Upland Road; Sharon, Massachusetts
- Coordinates: 42.12475°N 71.18400°W
- Line: Attleboro Line (Northeast Corridor)
- Platforms: 2 side platforms
- Tracks: 2

Construction
- Parking: 546 spaces
- Cycle facilities: 8 spaces
- Accessible: Yes

Other information
- Fare zone: 4

History
- Opened: June 1835
- Rebuilt: 1936; September 30, 2014

Passengers
- 2024: 756 daily boardings

Services
Preceding station	MBTA	Following station
Mansfield toward Wickford Junction	Providence/Stoughton Line	Canton Junction toward South Station
Former services
Preceding station	MBTA	Following station
Mansfield toward Foxboro	Foxboro event service 1989–1994	Canton Junction toward South Station
Preceding station	New York, New Haven and Hartford Railroad	Following station
East Foxboro toward New Haven	Shore Line	Canton Junction toward Boston
Location

Sharon station is an MBTA Commuter Rail station in Sharon, Massachusetts. It serves the Providence/Stoughton Line. The station has two separate entrances for inbound trains to Boston and for outbound trains to Providence and beyond. New platforms were constructed in 2014 to make the station accessible.

== History ==
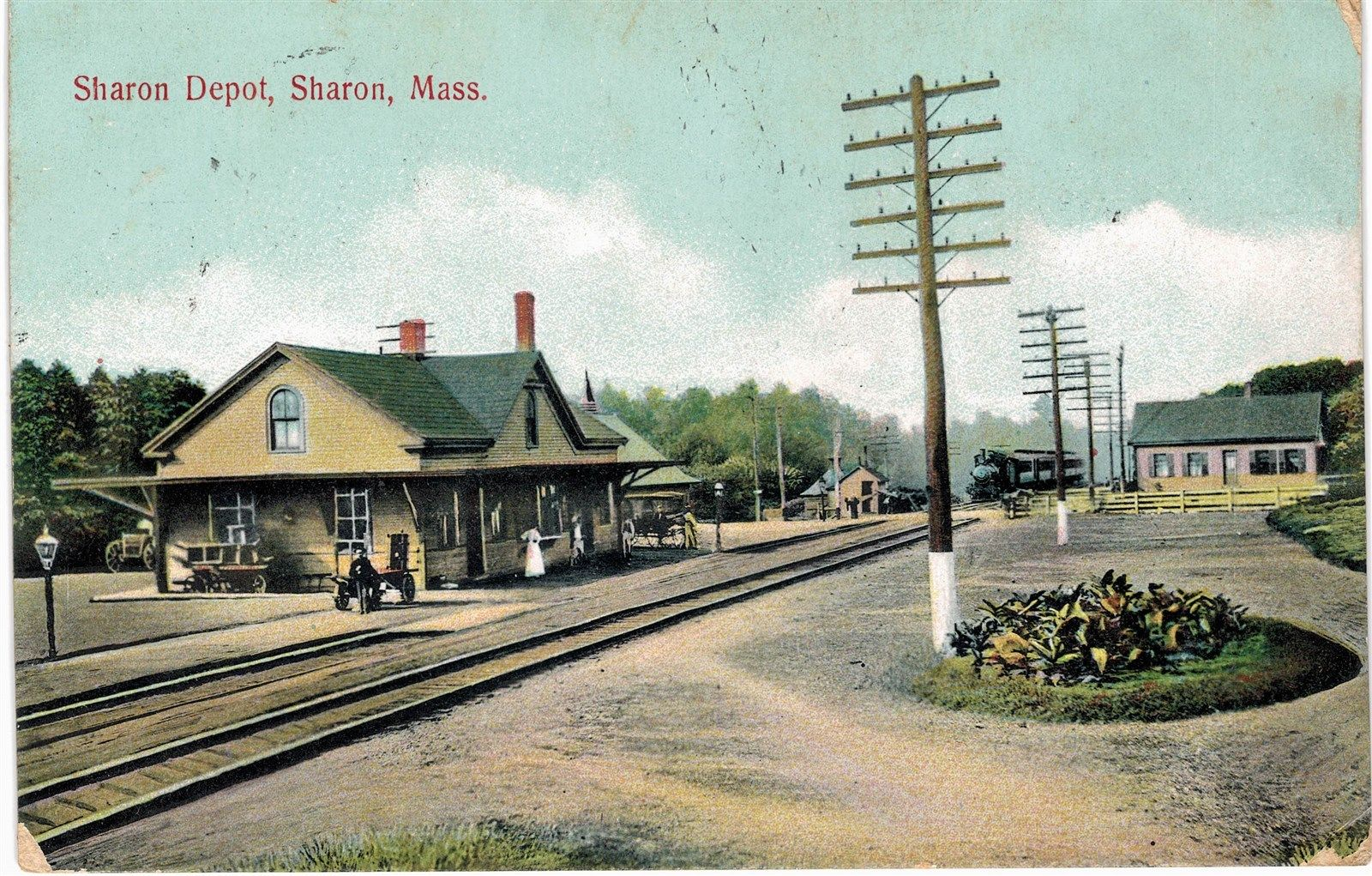
1870s-built Sharon station on a 1908 postcard

The Boston and Providence Railroad started full operations between the two cities in June 1835, including a station at the modern location in Sharon. In 1871, the original Sharon station was replaced by a larger building similar to those still extant at East Greenwich and Kingston in Rhode Island. The Boston and Providence was leased by the Old Colony Railroad in 1888, which was in turn absorbed by the New York, New Haven & Hartford Railroad in 1893.

The current inbound station building and the small outbound shelter were designed by F.J. Pitcher and built in 1936 by the New Haven Railroad. The Depot Road grade crossing was also replaced with a road bridge in 1936–37 at a cost of $127,094 (equivalent to $2,300,000 in 2024). It was considered a priority for elimination because of busy rail traffic – 78 daily trains – and because the Comet operated through Sharon at up to 95 miles per hour (153 km/h). The state issued a $9,789 contract (equivalent to $167,000 in 2024) in November 1937 for construction of platform canopies and other improvements related to the crossing elimination.

Penn Central took over New Haven Railroad commuter operations on January 1, 1969. On January 27, 1973, the MBTA acquired a number of Penn Central's Boston commuter lines, including the Providence/Stoughton Line. In June 1973, the MBTA began subsidizing commuter rail service to Sharon. The town had been part of the MBTA district since 1964.

From 1989 to 1994, Boston–Foxboro trains for events at Foxboro Stadium operated over the Northeast Corridor, with intermediate stops including Sharon. Boston–Foxboro service was rerouted over the Franklin Line in 1995. Overcrowding of the parking lot led to plans for a 102-space expansion in 1999 and a 31-space expansion in 2003; neither were built.

=== Accessibility ===
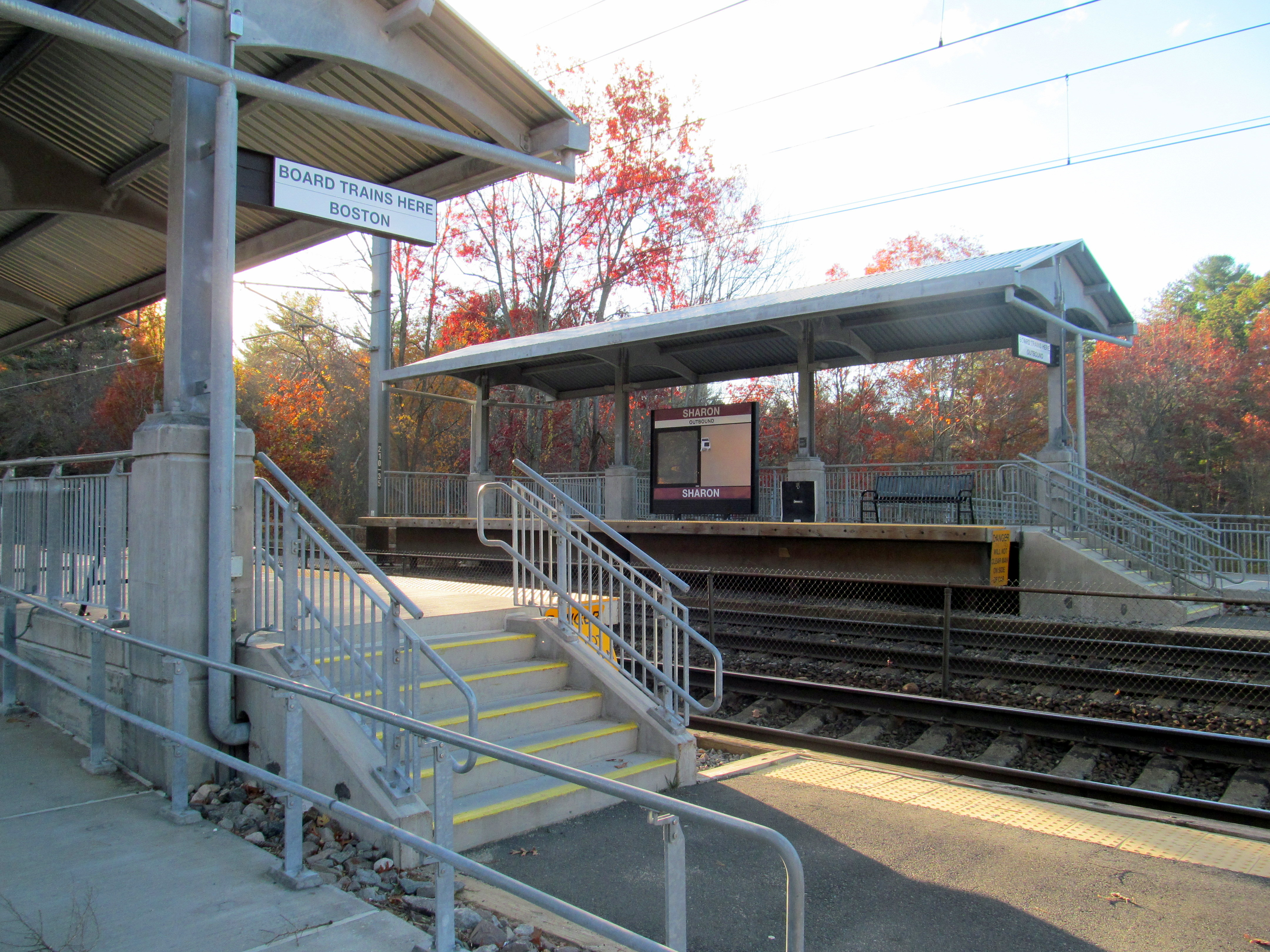
Mini-high platforms at Sharon station in 2016

Until 2014, Sharon was the busiest station on the system that was not accessible. All other stations with daily ridership above 1,000 passengers had accessible high-level platforms, as did all other stations on the busy Providence/Stoughton Line. After an accessibility complaint was filed in May 2011, construction was mandated to take place by November 1, 2012. No construction took place in 2012, prompting concerns that the commuter rail stop - not just the building - would be closed. On October 15, 2012, the state's Architectural Access Board granted the MBTA an extension until October 1, 2013 to make the station accessible.

The project, which included adding mini-high platforms and improving handicapped access to the building, was originally expected to begin in the spring of 2013 and to be completed that fall at a cost of $1.2 million. In May 2013, the MBTA issued a request for bids for the then-$2.6 million project, with work to start in August. Notice to Proceed was given to the chosen contractor on September 5, 2013, with work to be completed by February 2014. Noise testing begun in April 2014, followed by ongoing construction of mini-high platforms as well as improvements to the building and parking lot. The accessible parking spots and the building retrofits were completed during May 2014. The mini-high platforms were opened on September 30, 2014.

The stairs to the platforms were closed on January 29, 2023.

=== Other Sharon stations ===
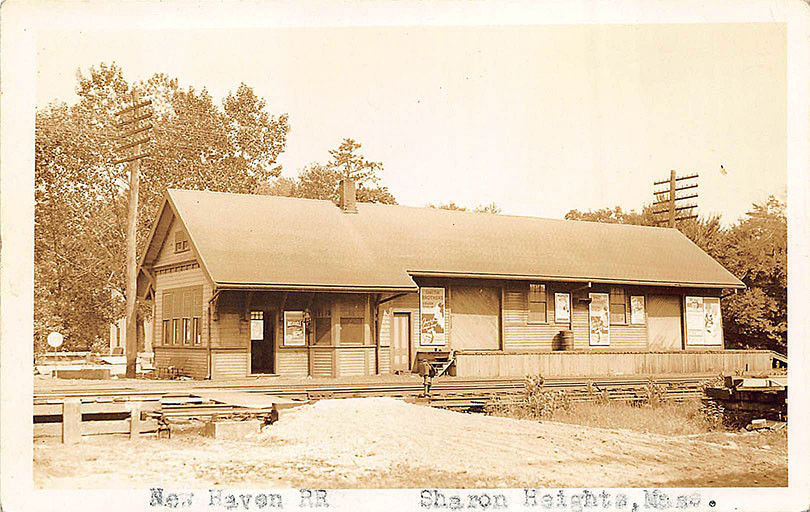
Sharon Heights station in the early 20th century

A station was located in Sharon Heights near Garden Street, about a mile south of Sharon proper. It was closed sometime in the mid-20th century, at least a decade before the 1973 MBTA takeover.

In the late 1800s, a short-lived half-mile branch line led from Sharon Heights to a summer-only station at Lake Massapoag. The branch was also used to haul ice from the lake to surrounding locales. The remnants of the wye to the branch are still visible from passing trains on the main line.
