= Plimptonville station =

Former railway station in Walpole, MA

Plimptonville
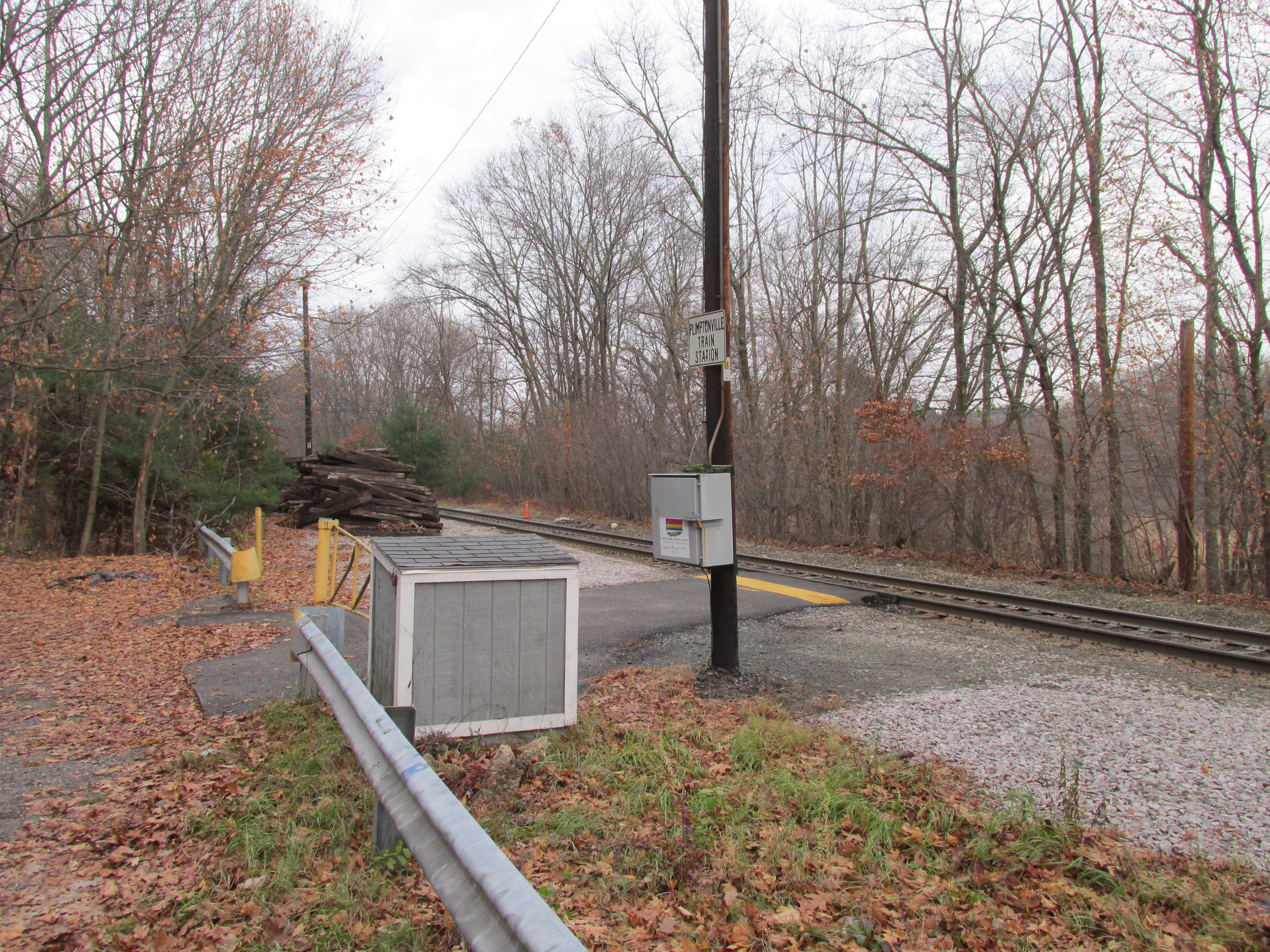
- The platform at Plimptonville station in December 2012

General information
- Location: 185 Plimpton Street; Walpole, Massachusetts
- Coordinates: 42.15856°N 71.23665°W
- Line: Franklin Branch
- Platforms: 1 side platform
- Tracks: 1

Construction
- Accessible: No

Other information
- Fare zone: 4

History
- Opened: April 23, 1849
- Closed: December 14, 2020
- Former names: Tilton(s), Plympton(s), Plimpton(s)

Passengers
- 2018: 12 daily boardings

Former services
Preceding station	MBTA	Following station
Walpole toward Forge Park/495	Franklin/Foxboro Line	Windsor Gardens toward South Station
Preceding station	New York, New Haven and Hartford Railroad	Following station
Walpole toward Blackstone	Midland Line	Norwood Central toward Boston
Location

Plimptonville station was an MBTA Commuter Rail station in Walpole, Massachusetts. It was located near the Neponset River next to a small dirt parking lot between Plimpton Street and the tracks. It was a flag stop on the Franklin Line, and received the least service of any MBTA station, with just one round trip per day, consisting of an inbound morning train and an outbound evening train at the height of rush hour. Ridership on that round trip averaged just 12 passengers daily by a 2018 count.

== Station design ==
Plimptonville had one of the smallest station facilities on the MBTA Commuter Rail system: an approximately 10-foot (3.0 m)-wide low-level asphalt platform next to the single track, with a small gravel parking lot.

== History ==
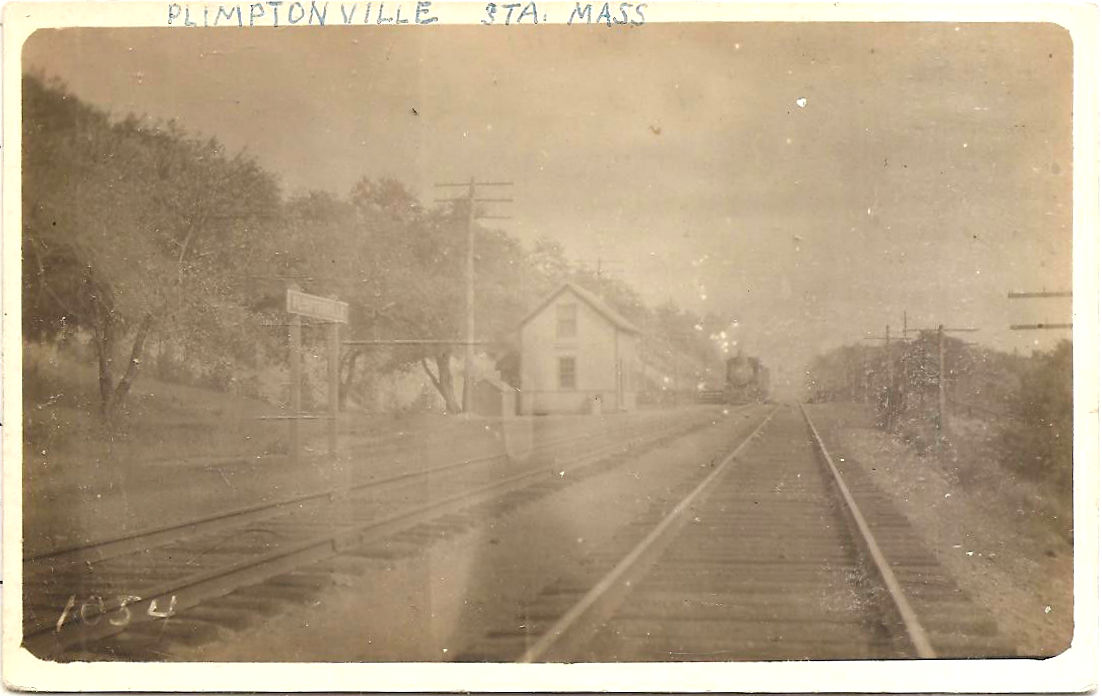
Plimptonville station on an early postcard

The Norfolk County Railroad was built through East Walpole beginning in 1846; it opened on April 23, 1849. Three stops were located in Walpole: West Walpole, Walpole, and Plimpton(s) – also spelled Plympton(s) – adjacent to the Plimpton Iron Works near East Walpole. Commuting from the station to Boston was possible beginning in 1850. After several reorganizations and mergers, the line became part of the New York and New England Railroad (NY&NE) in 1873.

The station was renamed to Tilton(s) by the 1870s after the mill village changed names. A small station building, no longer extant, was located on the northwest side of the tracks. Double-tracking through the station to Walpole was completed in 1881. The NY&NE was taken over by the New Haven Railroad-controlled New England Railroad in 1895; the new railroad was leased by the New Haven in 1898. Around 1894, the name was changed again to Plimptonville (sometimes spelled Plymptonville).

=== MBTA era ===
The 1964-formed MBTA began subsidizing service on the route on April 24, 1966; it became the Franklin Line of the MBTA Commuter Rail system. The station had become less important under public ownership due to its lack of parking, rural location, and proximity to the well-used Walpole station. Additionally, the station was in the middle of a single-track section of the line, severely limiting the number of trains that can stop. The MBTA closed the stop on February 1, 1981 due to budget cuts, but soon reopened it due to protests by riders. The single round-trip served a small but dedicated contingent of riders. A planned project to double-track the line through the station was announced in November 2019. As of November 2024, design work for that phase is expected to be completed in 2025.

The station was closed again on January 23, 2021 as part of the MBTA's "Forging Ahead" initiative, due to low ridership, operational impacts, and availability of alternatives, in response to the COVID-19 pandemic.
