= North Truro station =

North Truro
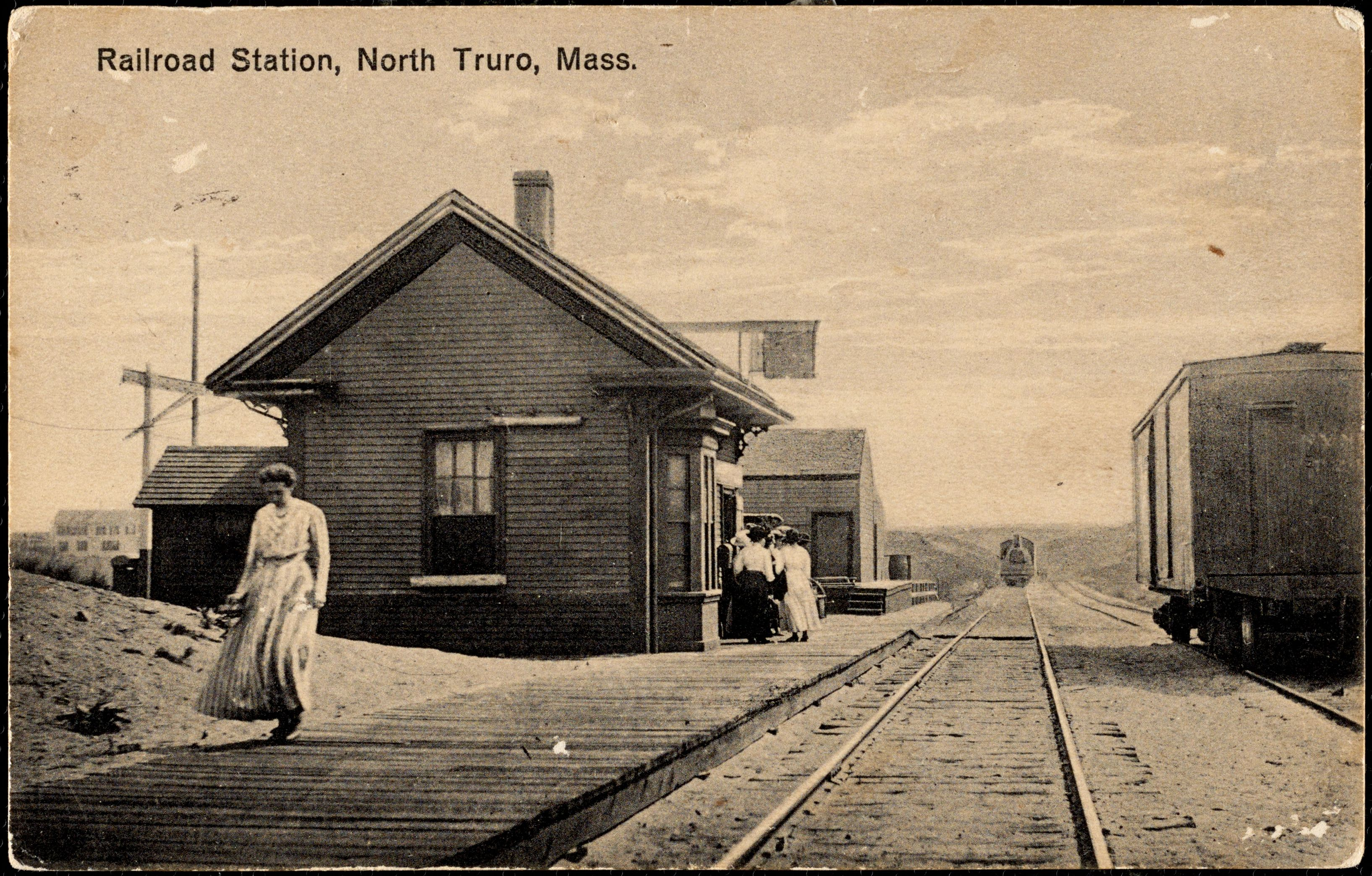
- 1917 postcard of North Truro station

General information
- Location: North Truro, Massachusetts
- Coordinates: 42°01′53″N 70°05′36″W

History
- Opened: July 23, 1873
- Closed: 1940

Former services
Preceding station	New York, New Haven and Hartford Railroad	Following station
Corn Hill toward Boston	Boston–Provincetown	Puritan Heights toward Provincetown
Location

North Truro station (designated as Moorland station in later years) was a train station located in North Truro, Massachusetts near the intersection of what is now Pond and Twinefield Roads.

North Truro (also known as Pond Village) first saw train service in 1873, when the Old Colony Railroad extended the tracks from Wellfleet, Massachusetts to Provincetown, with a depot probably built the same year. The first train actually arrived on July 23, 1873. It was razed when trackage was dismantled between North Eastham and Provincetown by the New York, New Haven & Hartford Railroad in Fall 1960.
