= Fall River Railroad =

Fall River Railroad may refer to:

- Fall River Railroad (1846); A railroad company established in 1846, connecting Fall River, Massachusetts to South Braintree, Massachusetts
- Fall River Railroad (1874); A railroad company established in 1874, connecting Fall River, Massachusetts to New Bedford

Both railroads would later become part of the Old Colony Railroad system.
