= Bay Colony =

Bay Colony may refer to:

- Massachusetts Bay Colony
- Bay Colony Railroad
- Bay Colony 1701, a locomotive
- Bay Colony Stadium
