= Tremont station (Massachusetts) =

Tremont
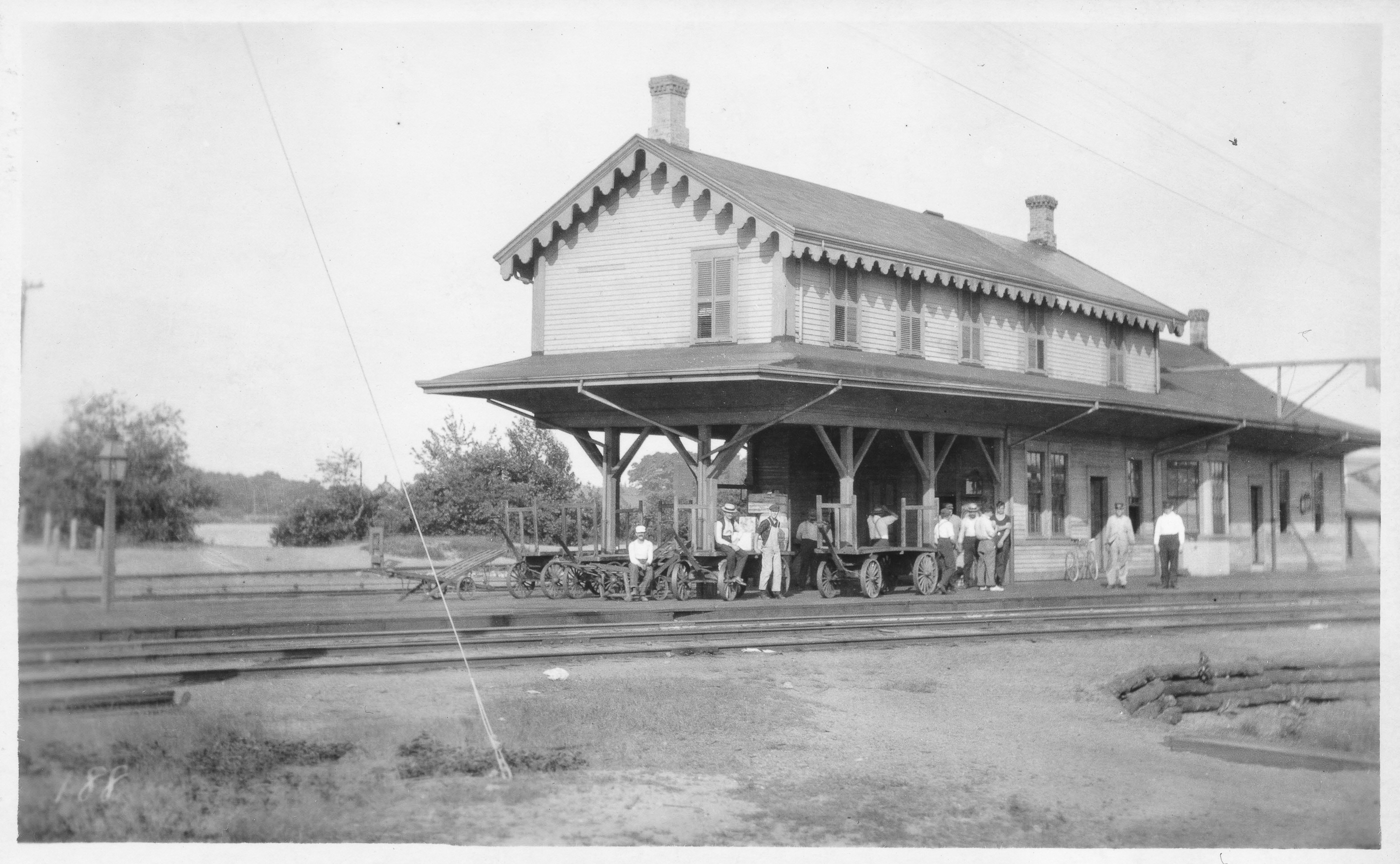
- Tremont station around 1910

General information
- Location: Mill Street, West Wareham, Massachusetts
- Coordinates: 41°47′19″N 70°45′56″W
- Lines: Cape Main Line; Fairhaven Branch

Former services
Preceding station	New York, New Haven and Hartford Railroad	Following station
Middleborough toward Boston	Boston–Woods Hole	Wareham toward Woods Hole
Middleborough toward Boston	Boston–Hyannis	Wareham toward Hyannis
Middleborough toward Boston	Boston–Provincetown	Wareham toward Provincetown
Marion toward Fairhaven	Fairhaven Branch	Terminus
Location

Tremont station (also known as West Wareham station) was located on Mill Street in West Wareham, Massachusetts. The station was located just east of the former junction of the Cape Cod Branch Railroad and the Fairhaven Branch Railroad.
