= Bournedale station =

Bournedale
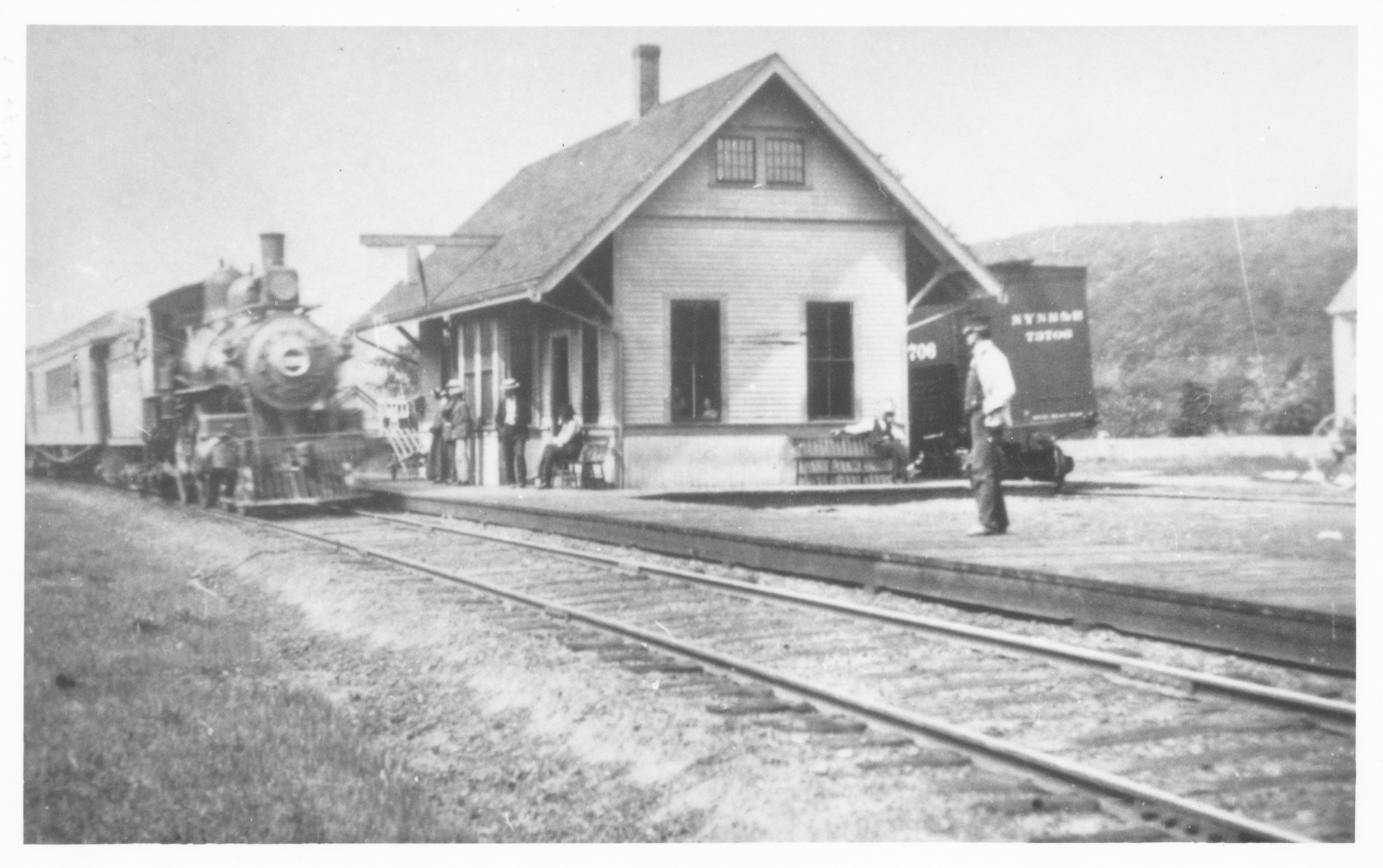
- A train at Bournedale station around 1900

General information
- Location: Sandwich Road near Autumn Way; Bourne, Massachusetts
- Coordinates: 41.772559°N 70.555811°W
- Line: Cape Main Line

History
- Opened: 1848
- Closed: 1920s
- Rebuilt: 1911
- Former names: North Sandwich, Sampson

Former services
Preceding station	New York, New Haven and Hartford Railroad	Following station
Bourne toward Boston	Boston–Hyannis	Sagamore toward Hyannis
Bourne toward Boston	Boston–Provincetown	Sagamore toward Provincetown
Location

Bournedale station was a railroad station serving Bournedale, Massachusetts. Opened in 1848, it was relocated in 1911 during construction of the Cape Cod Canal and closed in the 1920s.

== History ==
North Sandwich station was built by the Cape Cod Branch Railroad when the line was extended from Wareham to Sandwich in 1848. It was located off what is now Herring Run Road on the south side of the Herring River, approximately where the north canal service road / bike path is now located. Originally a flag stop, its ridership grew as Bournedale became a resort community. A new combination depot was built in 1895, by which time the stop was called Bournedale.

The 1909–1916 widening of the river into the Cape Cod Canal necessitated the relocation of the Cape Main Line between Buzzards Bay and Sagamore. The relocated line opened in late 1911, with Bourne station moved about 1,500 feet (460 m) east to the south side of the new canal. A ferry service was operated to connect the village to the station; a road bridge was never built despite requests from residents.

Bournedale station was closed between 1924 and 1930. The station building is no longer extant. The ferry service continued to run until August 15, 1932.
