= Wareham Village station =

Train station in Wareham, Massachusetts

Wareham Village
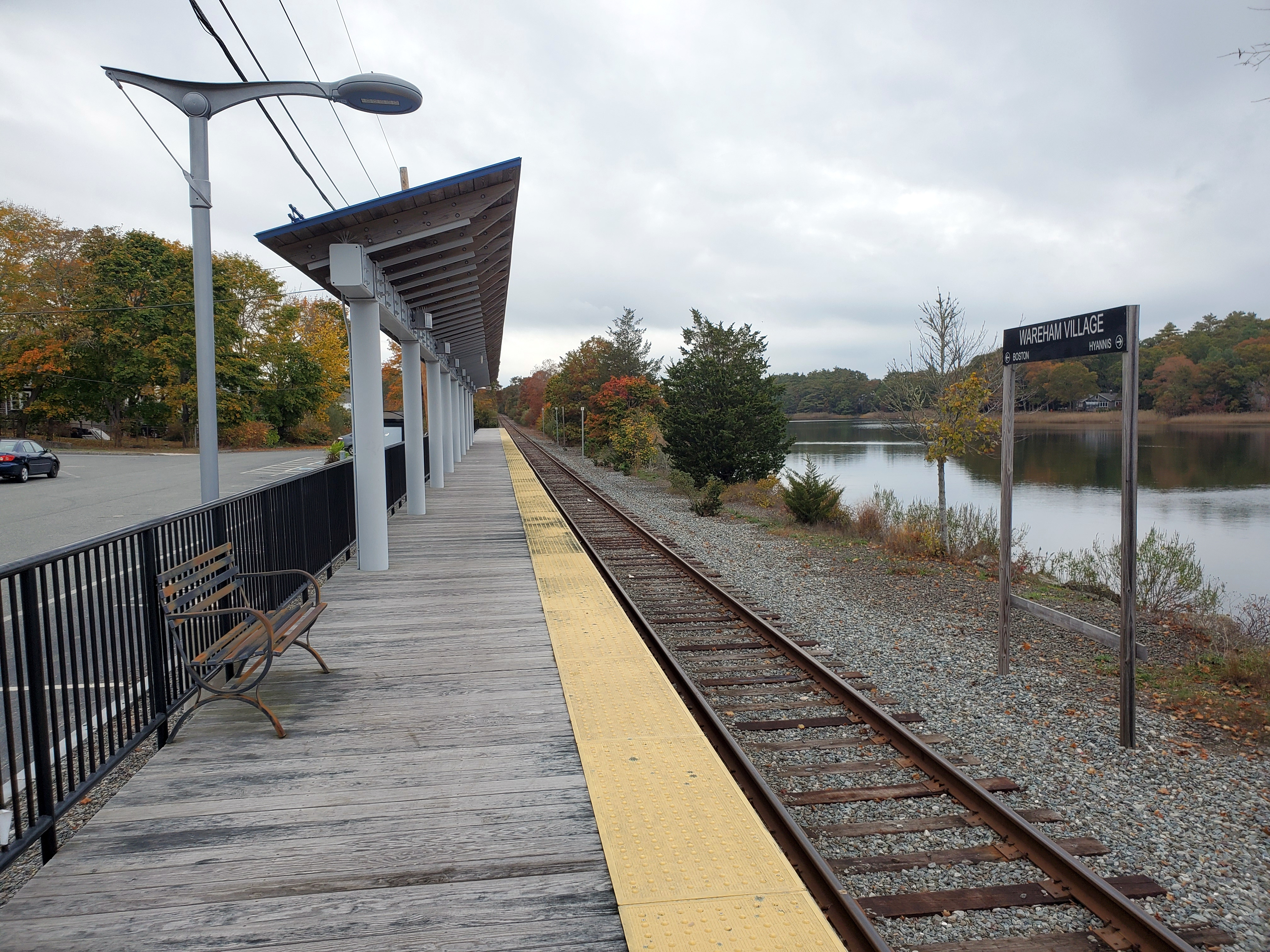
- Wareham Village station in October 2020

General information
- Location: Merchants Way; Wareham, Massachusetts
- Coordinates: 41°45′30″N 70°42′53″W
- Line: Cape Main Line
- Platforms: 1 side platform
- Tracks: 1
- Connections: GATRA: Link 1, Wareham–New Bedford Connection, Wareham–Plymouth Connection

Construction
- Parking: Yes; shared with nearby businesses
- Accessible: yes

History
- Opened: 1847; 1986; June 27, 2014
- Closed: 1964; 1996

Services
Preceding station	MBTA	Following station
Lakeville toward South Station	CapeFLYER	Buzzards Bay toward Hyannis
Former services
Preceding station	Amtrak	Following station
Taunton toward New York	Cape Codder 1986–1996	Buzzards Bay toward Hyannis
Preceding station	Cape Cod and Hyannis Railroad	Following station
Middleborough toward Braintree	Braintree-Hyannis 1984-1988	Buzzards Bay toward Hyannis or Falmouth
Taunton toward Attleboro	Attleboro Branch 1988	Buzzards Bay toward Hyannis or Falmouth
Preceding station	New York, New Haven and Hartford Railroad	Following station
Tremont toward Boston	Boston–Woods Hole	Onset toward Woods Hole
Tremont toward Boston	Boston–Hyannis	Onset toward Hyannis
Tremont toward Boston	Boston–Provincetown	Onset toward Provincetown
Taunton toward New York	Cape Codder	Buzzards Bay toward Hyannis or Woods Hole
Location

Wareham Village station is a train station that is located on Merchants Way in Wareham, Massachusetts. Service to Wareham formerly ran from 1848 until 1959. A shelter, built in 1985 for short-lived Amtrak and commuter service, is currently unused. A new platform constructed nearby for the CapeFLYER summer weekend service (and possible future MBTA Commuter Rail service) opened for the CapeFLYER on June 27, 2014.

== History ==
=== Previous service ===
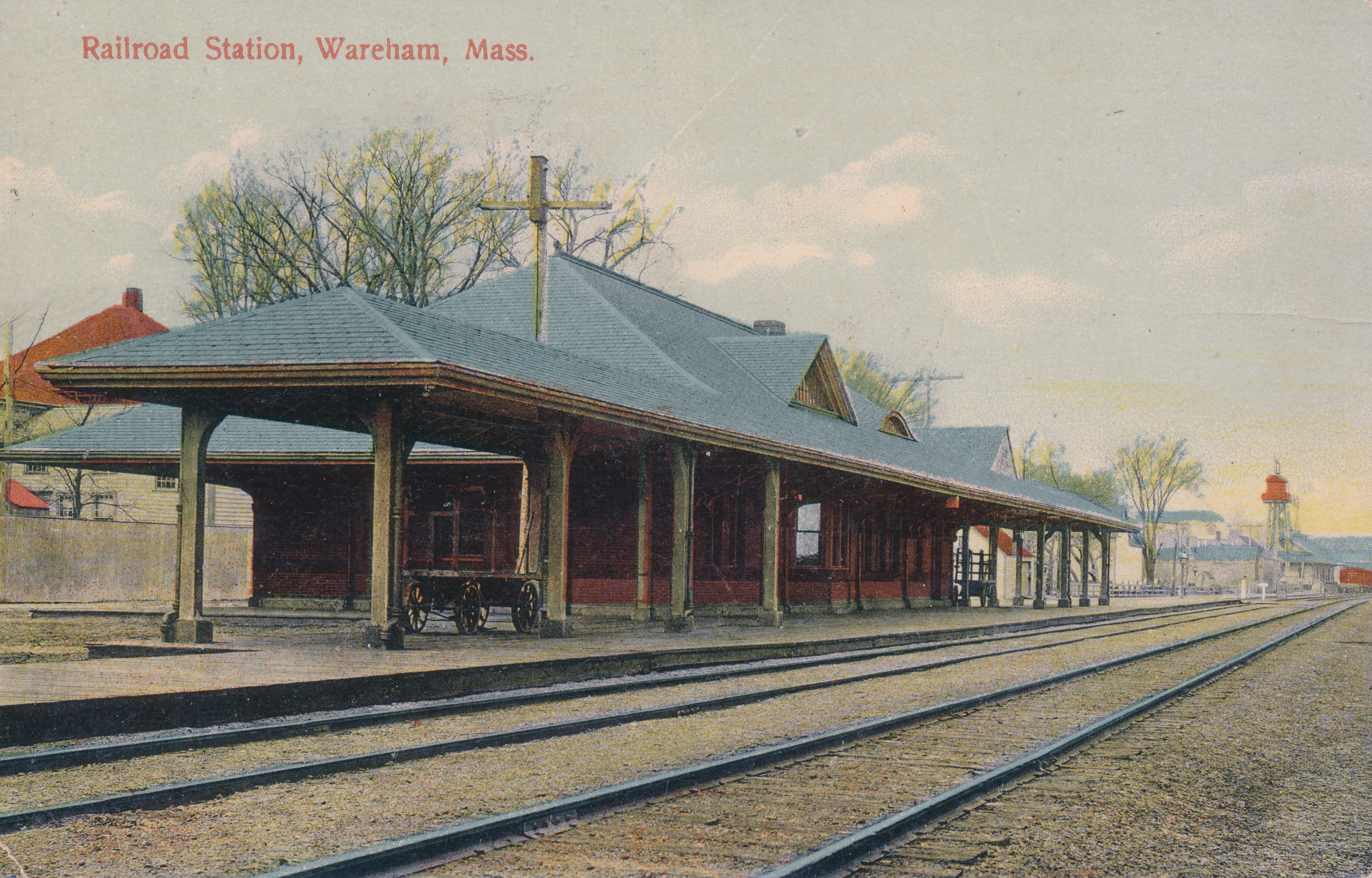
1900-built Wareham station - ca. 1908

The Cape Cod Railroad was completed from Middleborough to Wareham in January 1848, with later extensions to Buzzards Bay and onto Cape Cod itself. Stations were located at a number of locations in Wareham: Tremont (West Wareham) at the junction with the Fairhaven Branch at Pierceville Road, South Wareham (Burbanks) at Station Road, Parker Mills at Elm Street, Wareham on Main Street at Centre Street, Tempest Knob at Indian Neck Road, and Onset (known by a variety of names) at Depot Street. The line was taken over by the Old Colony Railroad in 1872, which itself became part of the New Haven Railroad system in 1893. The New Haven built a new station in 1900.

The station was a stop for daily trains to Boston (e.g., Cranberry, Buttermilk Bay, Sand Dune), as well as a stop for all the New Haven's long distance trains on its Cape Codder New York–Cape Cod service. Regular commuter and mainline service to Wareham lasted until 1959, with brief summer service revivals in the early 1960s. The 1900-built station was torn down in 1965.

A new Wareham station was built by the town of Wareham in 1985, consisting of an open air shelter and a set of restrooms. The station was served by Amtrak's Cape Codder from 1986 to 1996, and the Cape Cod & Hyannis Railroad from 1984 to 1988.

=== CapeFLYER and proposed commuter service ===
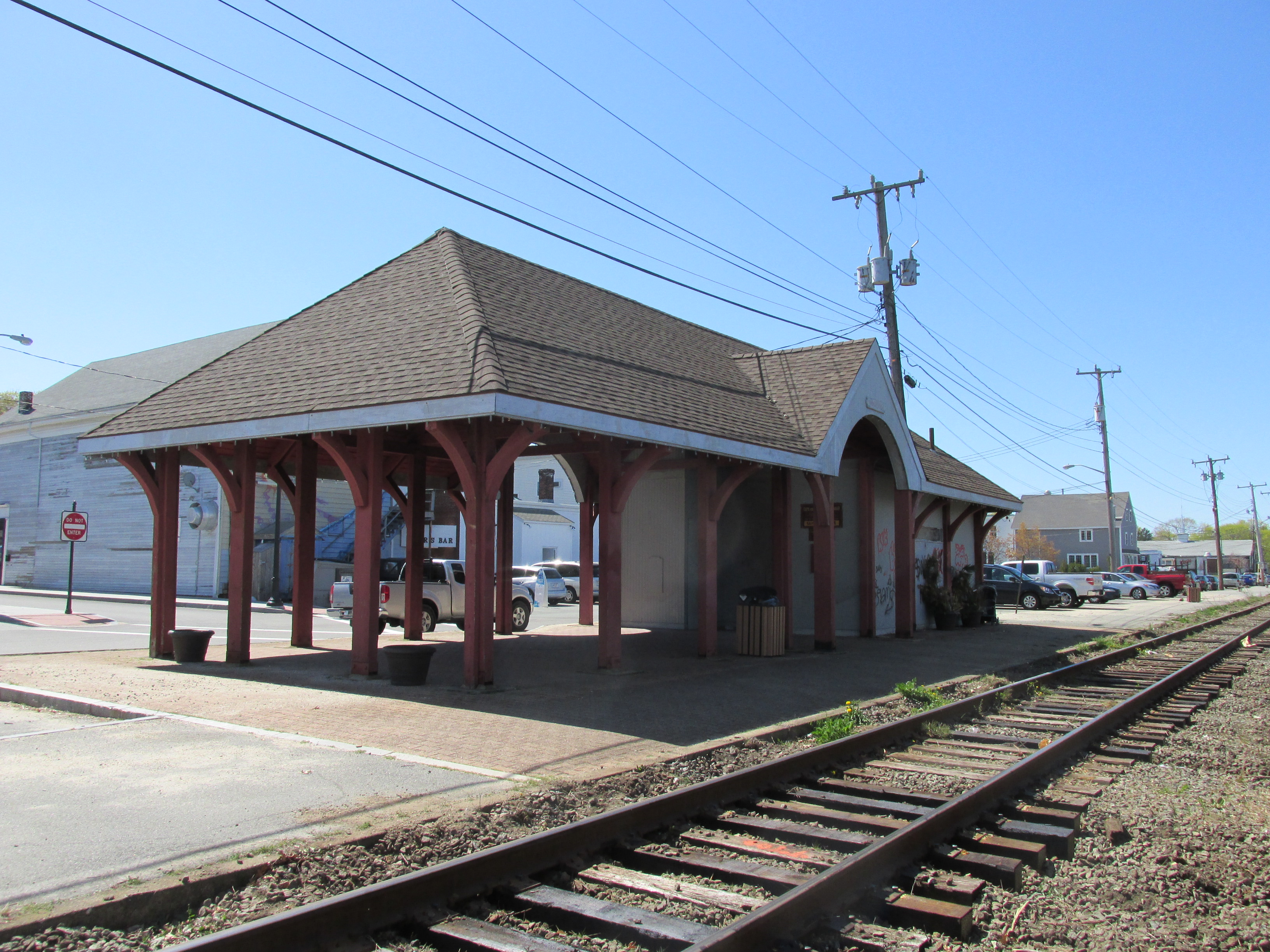
1985-built Wareham station in 2013.

The Middleborough/Lakeville Line was opened to Middleborough/Lakeville in 1997. In 2007, the Boston Region Metropolitan Planning Organization released a report evaluating the possibility of commuter rail service to Buzzards Bay including an intermediate stop at Wareham. Noting that parking is constrained in downtown Wareham, the report considered an additional station at County Road (continuation of MA-58) near West Wareham. This site would have more space for parking lots, and close access to I-495. However, other projects like the Greenbush Line received priority and the extension to Wareham and beyond was not advanced.

CapeFLYER summer weekend service between South Station and Hyannis began in 2013, though the stop at Wareham was not used to save travel time and because it was not handicapped accessible. After the first week of service, it was announced that Wareham would be a stop in 2014. All stations from Middleborough/Lakeville north were built with full-length high level accessible platforms in the mid 1990s as part of the Old Colony Lines restoration, while Buzzards Bay and Hyannis were retrofitted with mini-high platforms for the Cape Cod Central Railroad in 1999. Wareham only had a low-level platform built before modern accessibility standards, as laid out by the 1990 Americans with Disabilities Act, so a new platform was needed for CapeFLYER service to begin stopping at Wareham in 2014.

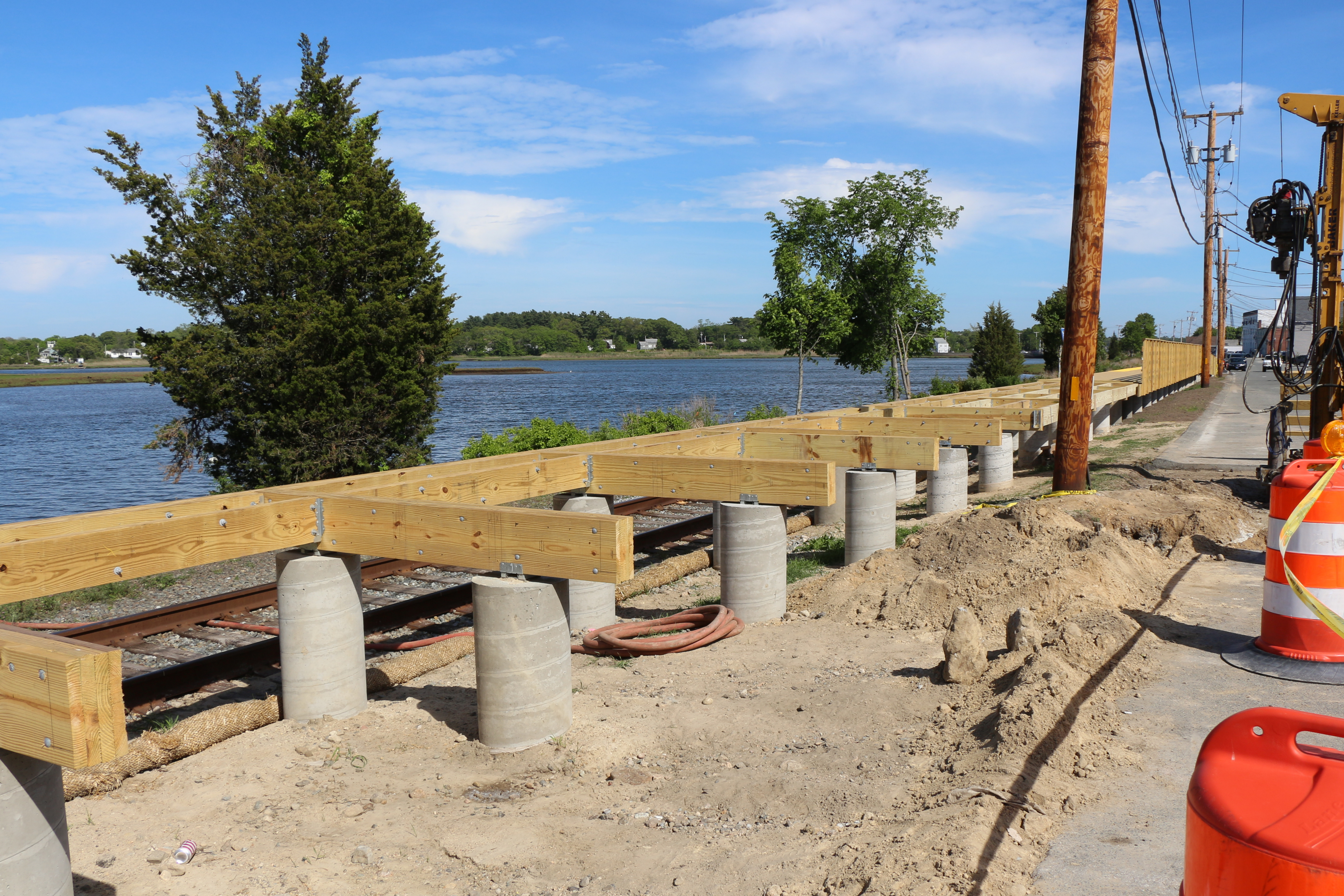
Construction of the new platform in June 2014

The 400-foot high-level boarding platform was built northwest of the 1985-built station in order to prevent riders from using up valuable downtown parking spots. An environmental notification form was filed with the state on March 12, 2014. The new platform, located across from Sawyer Street, was approved by the town's Conservation Commission that month and began construction in April. It was planned to be open for the resumption of CapeFLYER service in May, but the platform was not yet accessible by then.

The $500,000 project is funded by as part of a state bond bill; a separate effort by the town and GATRA will modify the parking lot with a bus loop. The CapeFLYER began stopping at Wareham Village station on June 27, 2014 after the completion of the handicapped accessible platform, following an opening event held on June 26.

In September 2013, the Wareham Chamber of Congress announced that based on the success of the CapeFLYER, the Chamber supported commuter rail extension to Buzzards Bay. The Buzzards Bay town selectmen similarly supported the idea later that year, and a public forum was held in January 2014. The building of the CapeFLYER platform is seen by state representatives as a step closer towards commuter rail service, though a station location at the Wareham Crossing shopping center in South Wareham was considered as well.

In fall 2020, the MBTA began conducting a study to evaluate the feasibility of implementing Buzzards Bay commuter rail service in conjunction with the currently-underway South Coast Rail project. Upon completion of the study in spring 2021, two different alternatives for service were presented, one terminating at Bourne station and the other at Buzzards Bay, both of which include service to Wareham Village.
