= CapeFlyer =

Seasonal rail service in Massachusetts

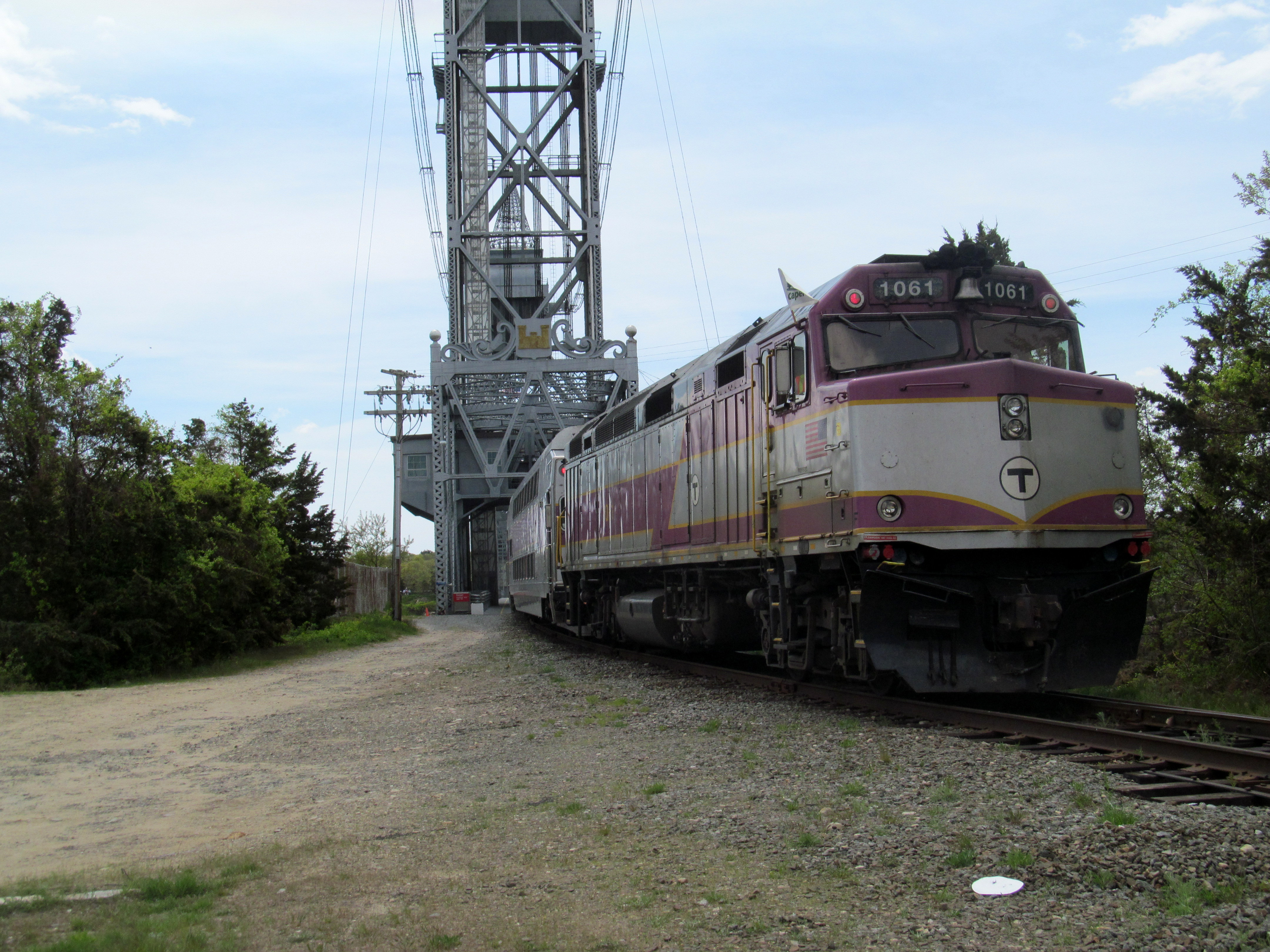
- A CapeFlyer train crossing the Cape Cod Canal Railroad Bridge

Overview
- Service type: Regional rail
- Status: Seasonal (Memorial Day–Labor Day)
- Locale: Southeast Massachusetts
- Predecessor: The Cranberry; The Sand Dune; The Buttermilk Bay
- First service: May 24, 2013
- Current operator: CCRTA using MBTA trains
- Ridership: 12,825 (2023); 13,588 (2024); 14,944 (2025)

Route
- Termini: South Station; Hyannis Transportation Center
- Stops: 8
- Distance travelled: 78 miles (126 kilometres)
- Average journey time: 2 hours, 19 minutes
- Service frequency: Friday, Saturday, and Sundays
- Lines used: Middleborough Main Line; Cape Main Line

On-board services
- Disabled access: Yes

Technical
- Track gauge: 4 ft 8 1/2 in (1,435 mm) standard gauge
- Track owners: MBTA, MassDOT

The CapeFlyer (stylized CapeFLYER) is a passenger rail service in Massachusetts between Boston and Cape Cod that began in 2013. It is operated by the Cape Cod Regional Transit Authority (CCRTA) in collaboration with the Massachusetts Bay Transportation Authority (MBTA) and the Massachusetts Department of Transportation (MassDOT). The service runs on the weekends, beginning Friday evenings and including holidays, between Memorial Day weekend and Labor Day weekend.

During 2013, its first season, the CapeFLYER carried a total of 16,586 passengers, with service extended from Labor Day to Columbus Day weekend due to its early success. In October 2013, MassDOT announced the service would return in 2014 and become a permanent seasonal service. Year-round weekend service over the route and full MBTA Commuter Rail service as far as Buzzards Bay are under consideration.

It is the first scheduled passenger train to Cape Cod since Amtrak's Cape Codder ceased operation in 1996, and the first direct service between South Station in Boston and Cape Cod since 1961. The Cape Cod & Hyannis Railroad operated scheduled service between Braintree station, south of Boston (the southern terminus of the MBTA's Red Line), and the Cape from 1984 until 1988, but did not extend that service to Boston proper.

== Route ==
The CapeFLYER route for the 2019 season

The CapeFLYER utilizes the Middleborough Main Line from Boston's South Station to Middleborough and continues to Hyannis via the Cape Cod Canal Railroad Bridge and the Cape Main Line, a state-owned rail corridor. The corridor is also used for freight by the Massachusetts Coastal Railroad, and heritage service provided by the Cape Cod Central Railroad.

Scheduled travel time between Boston and Hyannis, a distance of 78 miles, is about 2 hours and 20 minutes. The relatively slow running time is due to the track conditions between Buzzards Bay and Hyannis, which limits the speed of passenger trains on the Cape to 30 miles per hour. Extensive track rehabilitation was completed in early 2013, resulting in faster operating speeds between Middleborough and Buzzards Bay.

The Cape Cod Canal separates Cape Cod from the mainland and only two highway bridges cross it, the Sagamore and Bourne Bridges. Plans for a third highway bridge have stalled. Severe traffic jams are common at peak periods. The CapeFlyer, by crossing the canal over a separate railroad bridge, avoids this congestion.

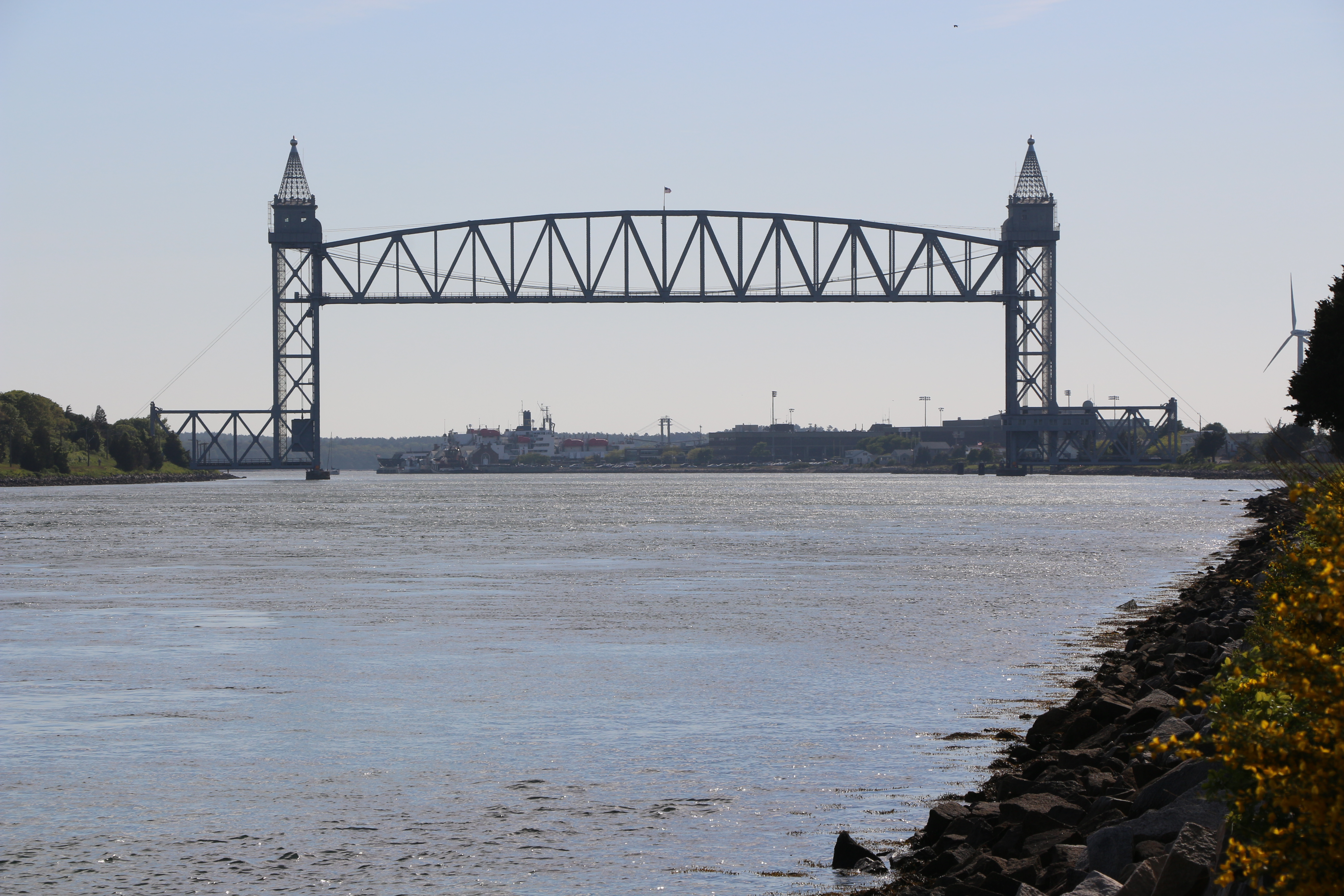
The Cape Cod Canal Railroad Bridge lets the CapeFlyer cross the canal independent of the two, often-congested, highway bridges.

=== Fare and ticket information ===
The adult fare between Boston and Hyannis is $22 one-way and $40 round-trip. CapeFLYER tickets, which are unreserved, can be purchased at the ticket office in South Station or on board the train at no additional cost, as well as being purchased with the MBTA mTicket app.

=== On-board services ===
On-board concessions, including beer and wine, are sold in the Cafe Car. A designated bicycle car offers storage and maintenance for passengers' bicycles, and free wireless internet service is also available aboard the entire train.

== History ==
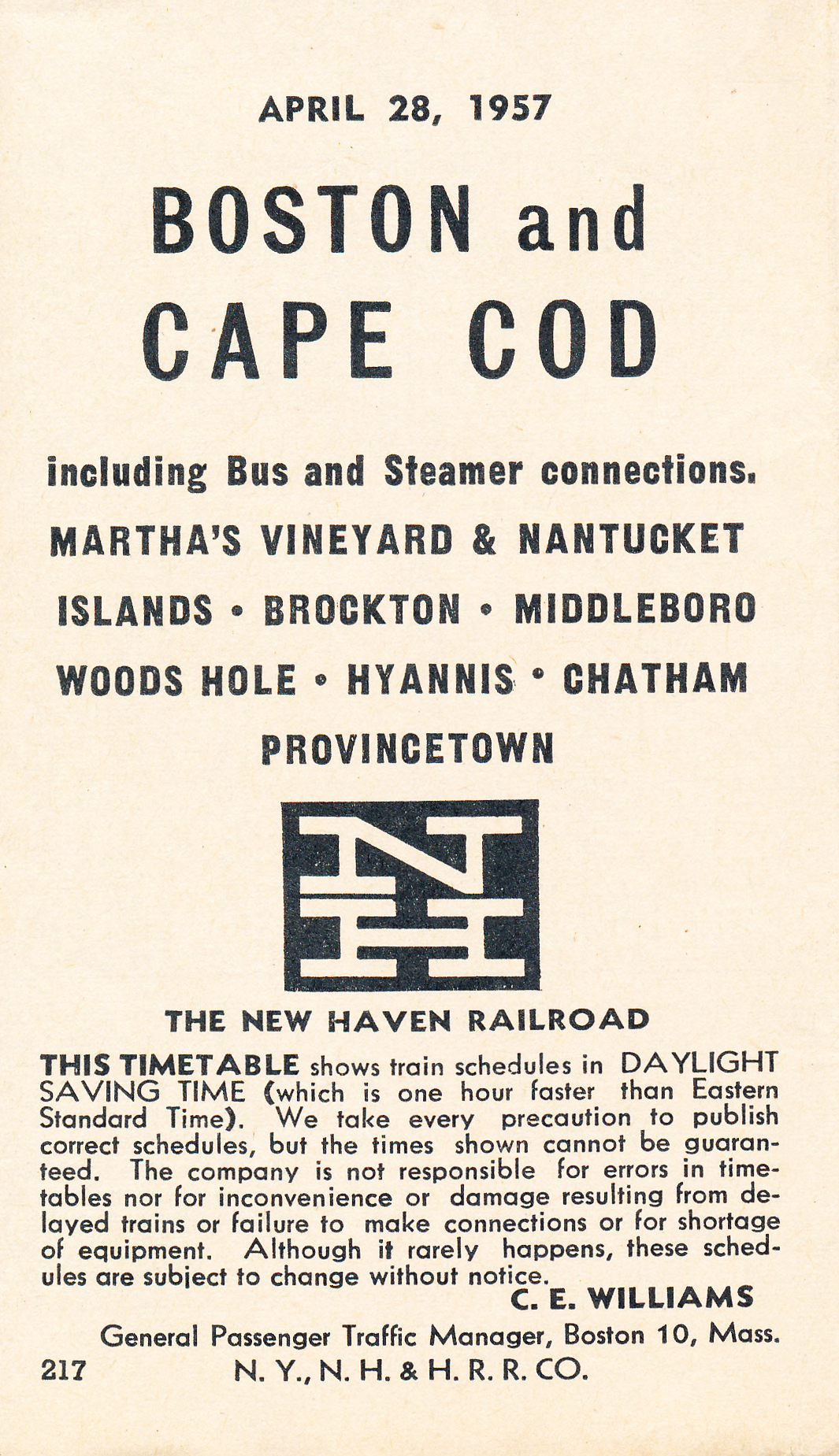
NH schedule for Boston-Cape Cod service from April 1957, two years before the end of previous regular service

=== Early railroads on Cape Cod ===
The first passenger train, which was operated by the Cape Cod Railroad Company, arrived in Hyannis on July 8, 1854. It is said that the train was met by a crowd estimated at 3,000. Immediately the line started running three trains a day to and from Boston.

Year-round direct passenger service between Boston and Hyannis continued until June 30, 1959, when the New York, New Haven & Hartford Railroad (NH) ended passenger service on its Old Colony Division. Up until that time, daily passenger service between Boston and Cape Cod had been operated to both Hyannis and Woods Hole with trains such as The Cranberry, The Sand Dune, and The Buttermilk Bay Service to Provincetown ended in 1941. The bridge over the Neponset River between Dorchester and Quincy burned soon after, preventing the quick return of service on the Old Colony Main Line.

The New Haven operated year-round trains from Boston to the Cape. However, the railroad's trains made stops at several stations eliminated from present-day CapeFlyer service: Sandwich, West Barnstable, Barnstable and Yarmouth. In addition to the Hyannis branch, the New Haven operated a southward branch that went to Falmouth and Woods Hole, for ferry service to the large islands to the south of Cape Cod, Martha's Vineyard and Nantucket Island. The stations of the Woods Hole branch included Monument Beach, Pocasset, North Falmouth, Falmouth and Woods Hole.

From the 1930s to the early 1960s, the company offered various summertime Cape Codder trains from New York City to the Cape. It offered a daily Day Cape Codder. On Friday afternoons it offered the Neptune; and on Friday nights offered a night train, the Night Cape Codder. Sunday nights had trains returning from Hyannis. Already by 1955, the New York service was reduced to summer only. However, the New Haven operated daily year-round service from Boston's South Station.

From 1960 to 1964 NH operated weekend service from New York to Hyannis/Woods Hole. Riding from Boston generally required a change of trains in either Attleboro or Providence, though a Boston-Hyannis trip ran via Stoughton and Taunton briefly in mid-1961.

Since then, numerous attempts have been made to restore regular passenger service. In 1974 officials from Penn Central, the owner of the rail lines on the Cape at that time, met with state and local officials to discuss the possible restoration of service. Most remaining trackage on the Cape was purchased by the Commonwealth of Massachusetts in 1976 to preserve the infrastructure for both freight service and future passenger service. A trial passenger train between Hyannis, Buzzards Bay and Falmouth, was operated for a week in the summer of 1979 after trackage was rehabilitated. Politicians hoped to have service regularly operating by 1981.

=== Cape Cod & Hyannis Railroad ===
During the summers of 1984 to 1988 the Cape Cod & Hyannis Railroad operated scheduled passenger service between Braintree and Cape Cod, with service to both Hyannis and Falmouth. The one-way trip to Hyannis took 2 hours and 25 minutes. In its last year of service, the Braintree-Cape Cod service carried 89,000 passengers. It was the last time Falmouth was served by passenger trains; derelict trackage was dismantled south of North Falmouth in 2007 and replaced with an extension of the Shining Sea Bikeway amid public opposition.

The Cape Cod & Hyannis Railroad ceased operation in February 1989 when the Massachusetts Executive Office of Transportation and Construction suspended the subsidy for the 1989 season due to the state's fiscal crisis.

=== Amtrak's Cape Codder and other service ===
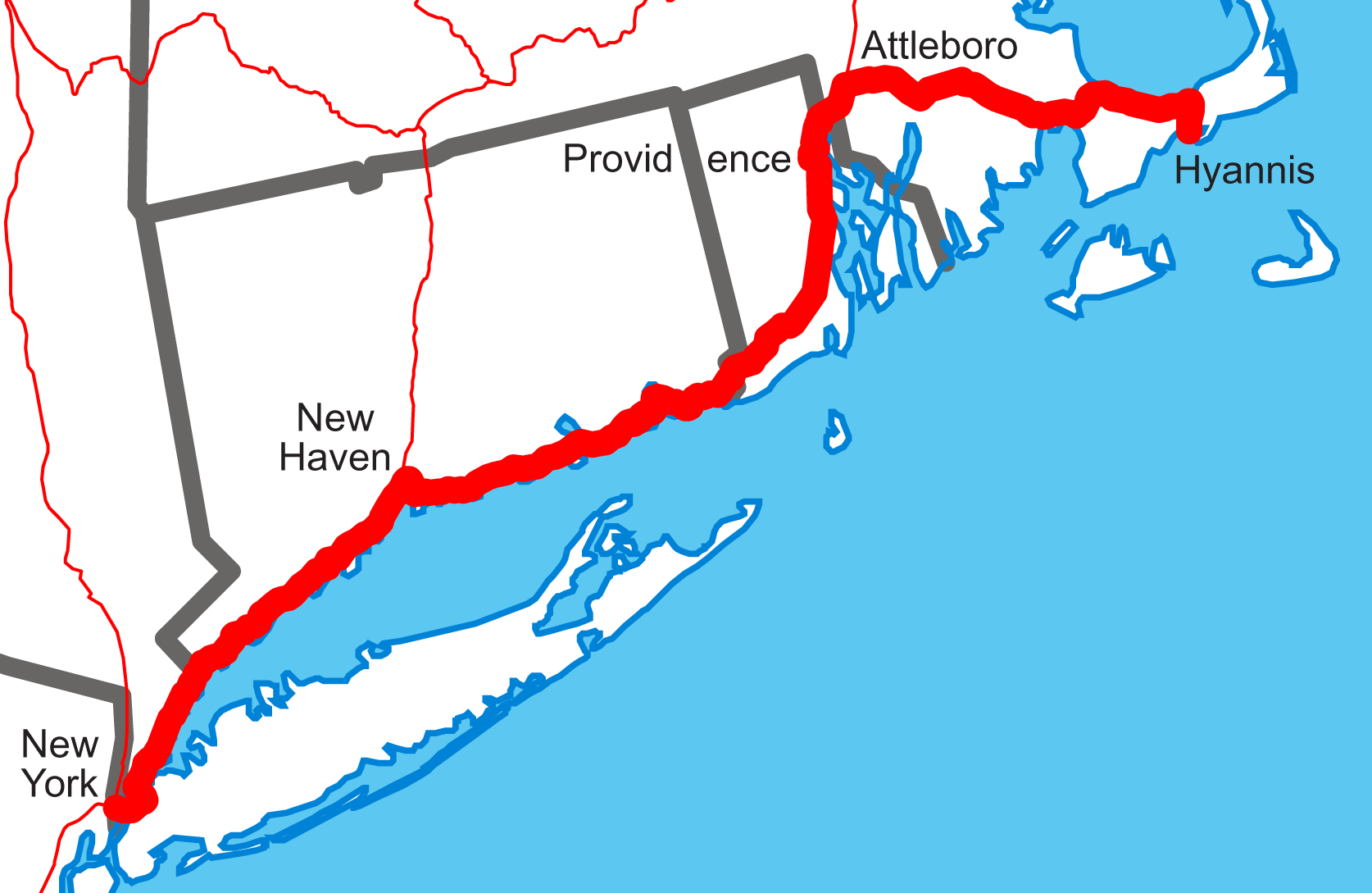
Route of the Cape Codder from 1986 to 1995

From 1986 to 1996 Amtrak operated a train known as the Cape Codder from Washington, DC/New York City to Hyannis. The service was routed from Attleboro to Taunton via a section of track that was once part of the Taunton Branch Railroad. Traveling between Boston and Cape Cod required transferring to Providence/Stoughton Line or Regional service at Providence. The Cape Codder was discontinued after 1996, despite moderate success, due to the end of the state subsidy.

The Middleborough/Lakeville Line opened in September 1997 along with the Plymouth/Kingston Line, restoring passenger service to 60 miles of the Old Colony network. Initial plans called for full service as far as Buzzards Bay, but the final route was scaled back due to high costs and uncertain ridership. In 2007, a Boston Region Metropolitan Planning Organization report analyzed the possibility of an extension to Buzzards Bay. At that time ridership was estimated to be between 1,766 weekday riders with four daily trips, and 2,750 riders with all Middleborough trains extended to Buzzards Bay.

The Cape Cod Railroad operated excursion service from 1989 to 1997, followed by the Cape Cod Central Railroad starting in 1999. However, neither service ventured north of Buzzards Bay and occasionally Wareham, making them largely useless for those traveling to the Cape from outside areas.

=== CapeFLYER ===
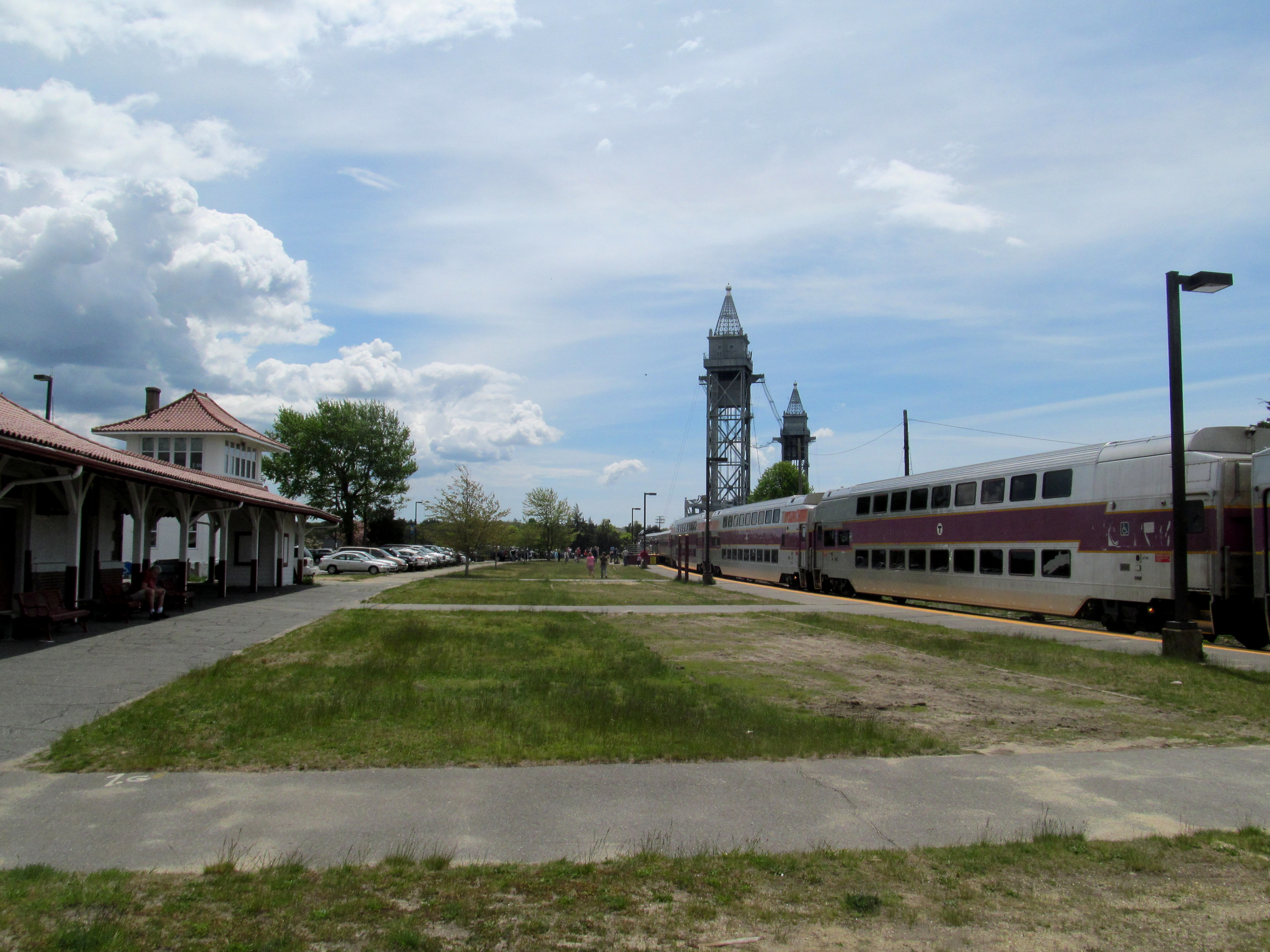
Trial run of the CapeFLYER at Buzzard's Bay Station

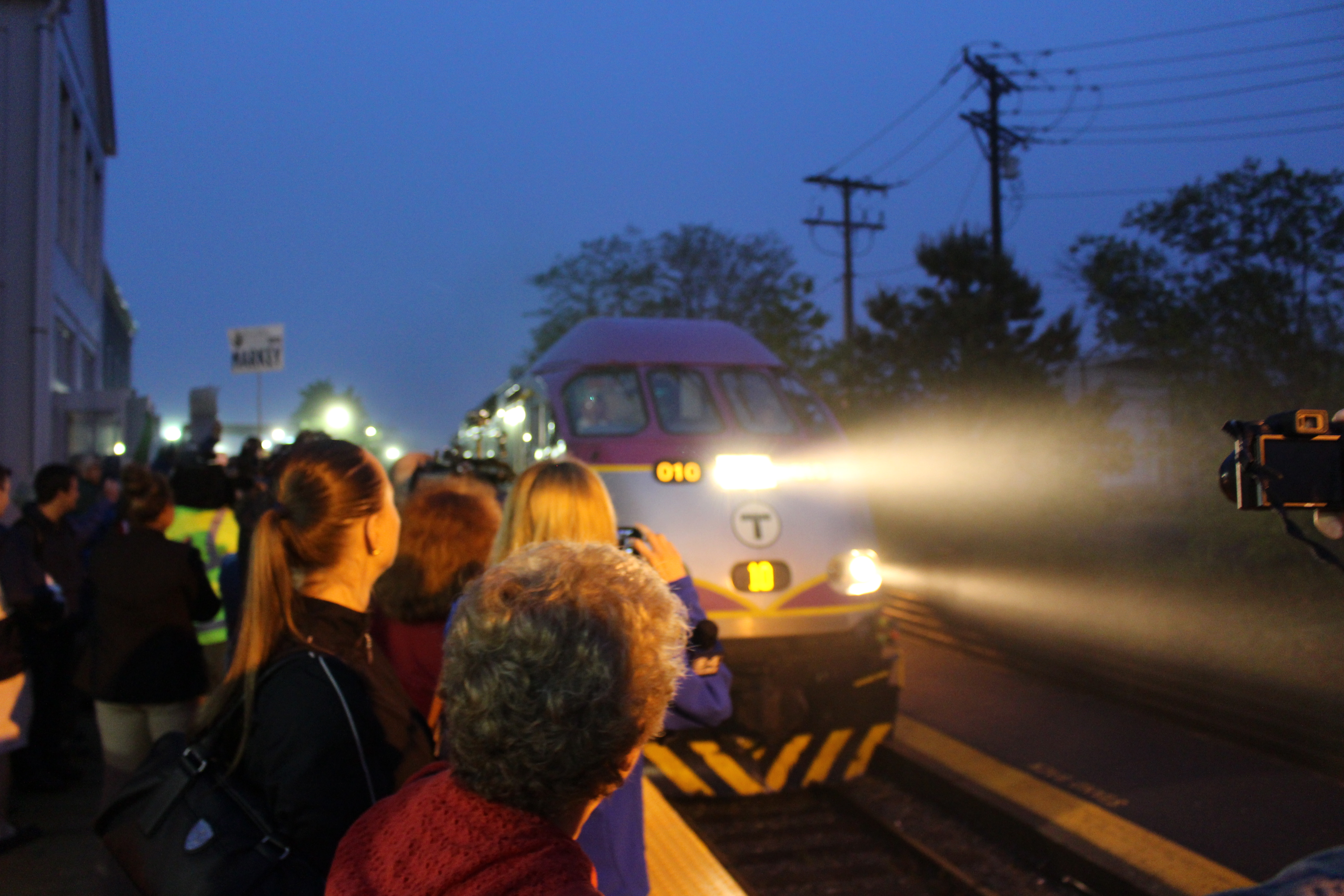
The inaugural run of the CapeFLYER arrives in Hyannis on May 24, 2013

In early 2011 the CCRTA awarded a contract to the Transportation Planning and Resource Group, a consulting firm, to study the "obstacles, impediments and funding issues associated with reviving passenger rail service to Cape Cod." At that time the CCRTA had hoped to launch seasonal rail service from Boston for the summer of 2012. The launch of service was pushed back a year, to 2013, in part to avoid the perception that the CCRTA's new service to the Cape might be adding to the MBTA's fiscal problems.

In late 2012 the CCRTA announced that a decision had been made to restore passenger service between Boston South Station and Cape Cod starting Memorial Day weekend 2013. The Patrick-Murray administration made the announcement official on April 2, 2013 at a press conference at South Station in Boston.

A test train with passengers aboard was run on May 18, 2013 – the first direct train from Boston to Cape Cod since 1961, and the first via the Old Colony main line since 1959. The CapeFLYER's inaugural journey departed South Station at 5:12 p.m. on Friday, May 24, 2013, with about 200 passengers destined for Buzzards Bay and Hyannis. The CapeFLYER has operated one round trip on Fridays, Saturdays and Sundays each year since its inception.

During its first year of service, the train only made stops at South Station, Braintree, Middleborough/Lakeville, Buzzards Bay, and Hyannis. New stops have been added on three separate occasions: at the newly-constructed Wareham Village station in 2014, at the existing Brockton commuter rail station in 2015, and the newly-constructed Bourne station in 2019.

== Ridership ==
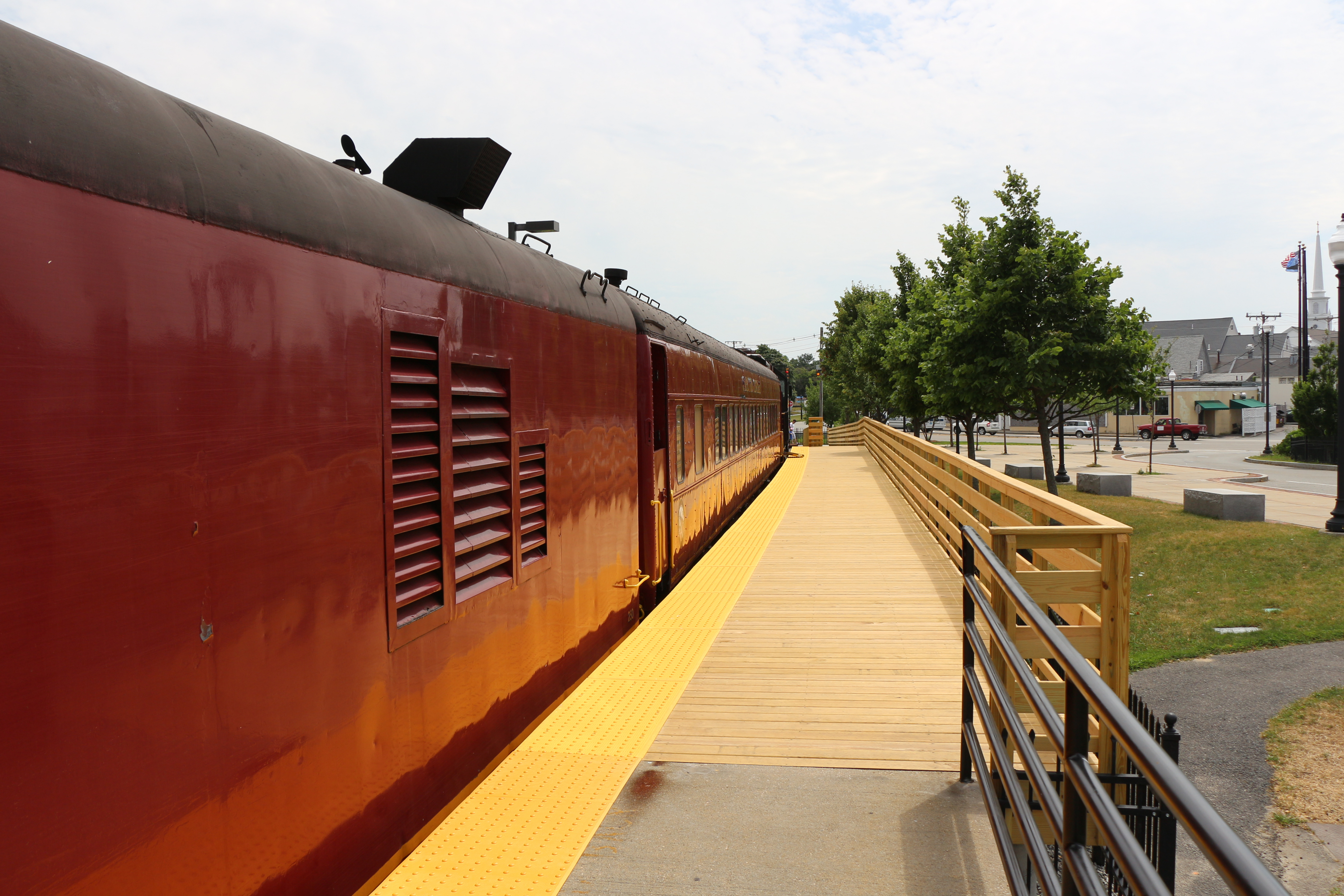
The newly constructed platform at the Hyannis Transportation Center, added in 2014

For the 2013 season, total ridership was 16,586 passengers. Revenue was $293,000 (including the period after Labor Day), and $27,000 in advertising revenue.

For the 2014 season, the CapeFlyer carried 12,625 passengers, down from about 15,000 for the similar period in 2013. Fare revenue was $221,000, with $93,000 from advertising.

For 2015, ridership was 13,278 – up from 2014, but still down from 2013 – with fare revenue of $223,000.

In 2016 ridership was 13,663, however there were only 15 weekends of service vs. 16 in 2015, so per round trip ridership was up 9.2%. Revenue was $230,000.

Ridership was 16,045 in 2026, up 7% from 14,944 in 2025.

== Finances ==
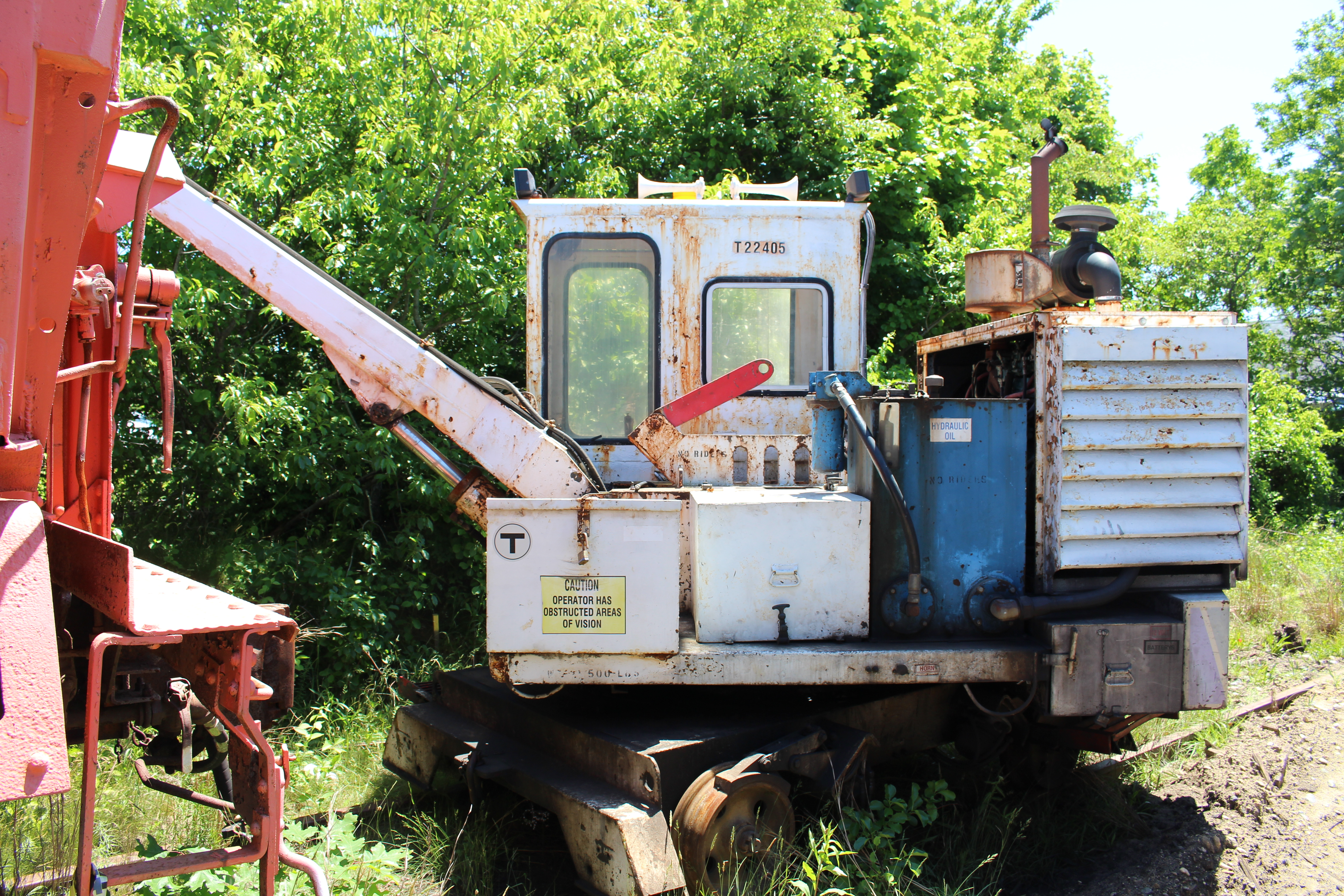
MBTA rail maintenance equipment that was brought in to upgrade the tracks for CapeFLYER service in early 2013

In its inaugural season the CapeFlyer generated $290,756 in fare revenue and its operating costs were estimated to be $180,000 to $190,000. Marketing costs during the first year were between $110,000 and $120,000. These costs were offset by ticket sales and revenue collected from on-board concessions and advertising.

The capital costs associated with the start of the CapeFLYER in 2013 were approximately $3.4 million. This included track surfacing, fresh track ballast, installation of new railroad ties, new signage, improvements to the Buzzards Bay and Hyannis stations, and repairs to numerous grade crossings along the Cape Main Line.

MassDOT's draft Capital Investment Plan for FY2014-FY2018 includes $31 million to complete track and signal projects necessary to restore permanent, seasonal Cape Flyer passenger service to Cape Cod.

In 2014 a new station platform in Wareham was constructed and the station platforms in Buzzards Bay and Hyannis were expanded, at a total cost of about $2.5 million.

== Expansion and development ==
=== Service changes ===
In October 2013, MassDOT announced that the CapeFLYER would be a permanent seasonal service, with a study to be made of year-round weekend service.

For the 2015 season, the CapeFLYER operated with a dedicated trainset on Fridays (rather than continuing an existing local commuter train), thus allowing a more convenient departure time and fewer stops on that train. Also in 2015, all CapeFLYER trains began to stop at the Brockton commuter rail station to provide a one-seat ride between Brockton and Cape Cod.

In August 2019, after a train ran out of seats, MassDOT added another bi-level passenger car to the train. This was done at the request of the Cape Cod Regional Transit Authority before the weekend of August 9.

Operations in the 2020 season were delayed by the COVID-19 pandemic, with seasonal service not beginning until June 26, 2020, over a month later than planned.

The CapeFLYER does not currently stop at the Cape Cod Central Railroad stations in Sandwich or West Barnstable in an effort to get the train to Hyannis in a reasonable amount of time.

A new first-class car was implemented during the 2021 season, featuring reclining leather seats with footrests, as well as a seat-side food and beverage services, for a $10 surcharge. The extra services and surcharge were discontinued for the 2022 and 2023 seasons, with the car simply used as a regular coach, but was brought back for the 2024 season.

=== Wareham Village station ===
Less than a week after the service launched Thomas Cahir, the Administrator of the CCRTA, announced that the CapeFLYER would stop at the station in Wareham starting in 2014.

The MassDOT announcement included confirmation of the addition of the Wareham stop in 2014, though Cahir backtracked on his previous statement saying the stop was not "fiscally prudent." However, CCRTA and MassDOT proceeded with plans for the Wareham stop. Construction of a high-level platform at Wareham began in April 2014, and the CapeFLYER began stopping there in late June.

=== Bourne station ===
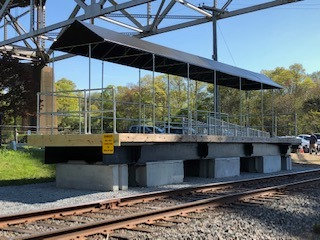
The Bourne station shortly after opening in spring of 2019.

In September 2014 it was announced that MassDOT was considering a new CapeFLYER station stop in Bourne for the 2015 season. The new 400-foot station platform, as proposed, would be built at the railroad right of way below the Bourne Bridge approach. MassDOT also announced plans to restore a siding on the north side of the Cape Cod Canal Railroad Bridge and to install a new double-ended 4,000-foot passing siding just south of the canal. The new track work, and associated switches and signals, would facilitate multiple train moves during a single bridge drop.

In February 2015, it was announced that the opening of the station would be delayed one year, due to the amount of snow received during the winter and local unease over the project. After the conclusion of the season in 2015, it was announced that current plans for building a station in Bourne had been suspended. Following several years of uncertainty, the station subsequently opened in 2019, when a prefabricated section of high-level platform was installed in lieu of a fully-constructed station.

=== Future proposals ===
==== Commuter rail to Buzzards Bay ====
The relative success of the CapeFLYER has brought new attention to the possibility of extending the Middleborough/Lakeville Line. The possibility was seriously discussed before the end of its first summer season. In September 2013, the Wareham Chamber of Commerce announced that based on the success of the CapeFLYER, the Chamber supported commuter rail extension to Buzzards Bay. The Buzzards Bay town selectmen similarly supported the idea later that year, and a public forum was held in January 2014.

Bourne's Transportation Advisory Committee began studying the possibility in mid-2014, with the addition of work by MassDOT's Central Transportation Planning Staff (CTPS) in November 2014. A Local Impact Report released in April 2015 proposed an 800 foot (240 m) high-level platform and two parking alternatives: a 120-space modification of the existing lot, and a 400-to-600-space structure including a realignment of Academy Drive. The CTPS data estimated ridership at 875 daily riders if all Middleborough trains were extended to Buzzards Bay, or slightly fewer with a limited number of trains.

Bourne voted to join the MBTA district in 2015 and began paying an assessment in mid 2016 (for FY 2017), although there was no guarantee that commuter rail service would be provided in the fiscally constrained environment. For FY 2017, Bourne paid $41,707 to the MBTA plus an existing $88,429 to the CCRTA for existing bus service. MassDOT began planning a possible commuter rail trial service in October 2015. In February 2016, state representatives and CCRTA administrator Thomas Cahir said that the state wishes to begin trial service during FY 2017.

While the various proposals for commuter rail service in the mid-2010s were not realized, the MBTA began a study in fall 2020 to evaluate the feasibility of implementing Buzzards Bay commuter rail service in conjunction with the currently under-construction South Coast Rail. Upon completion of the study in spring 2021, two different alternatives for service were presented, one of which would terminate at Buzzards Bay station and the other of which would continue to Bourne station.

In September 2023, State Representative Dylan Fernandes introduced a bill which would require at least three weekday round trips per day between Boston and Buzzards Bay within twelve months, and order a feasibility study for further extensions to Falmouth, Bourne, Barnstable, Yarmouth, and Sandwich.

== Station list ==
CapeFlyer tickets are not priced using the MBTA Commuter Rail's numbered fare zone system. Instead, the route is divided into three sections (Boston–Brockton, Lakeville–Bourne, and Hyannis), with ticket prices varying depending on origin and destination.

Mile (km)	Location	Station	Connections and notes
0.0 (0)	Boston	South Station	Amtrak: Acela, Lake Shore Limited, Northeast Regional; MBTA Commuter Rail: Fairmount, Fall River/New Bedford, Framingham/Worcester, Franklin/Foxboro, Needham, Greenbush Line, Kingston, and Providence/Stoughton lines MBTA subway: Red Line, Silver Line (SL1, SL2, SL3, SL4); MBTA bus: 4, 7, 11; Intercity buses at South Station Bus Terminal
10.9 (17.5)	Braintree	Braintree	MBTA subway: Red Line; MBTA Commuter Rail: Fall River/New Bedford Line, Kingston Line; MBTA bus: 226, 230, 236
20.0 (32.2)	Brockton	Brockton	MBTA Commuter Rail: Fall River/New Bedford Line; Brockton Area Transit Authority: 1, 2, 3, 4, 4A, 5, 6, 8, 9, 10/11, 12, 13, 14, BSU 28
35.6 (57.3)	Lakeville	Lakeville	GATRA:
49.1 (79.0)	Wareham	Wareham Village	GATRA: Link 1, Wareham–New Bedford Connection, Wareham–Plymouth Connection
54.7 (88.0)	Buzzards Bay	Buzzards Bay	Cape Cod Central Railroad; GATRA: Link 2 CCRTA: Bourne Run, Sandwich Line; Peter Pan
56.4 (90.8)	Bourne	Bourne	CCRTA: Falmouth shuttle Steamship Authority Shuttle
79.1 (127.3)	Hyannis	Hyannis Transportation Center	Cape Cod Central Railroad; CCRTA: Barnstable Villager, H2O, Hyannis Crosstown, Hyannis Trolley, Sandwich Line, Sealine; Peter Pan, Plymouth & Brockton

== See also ==
- Cannonball - A similar service operated by the Long Island Rail Road that runs between New York City and Montauk.
- Berkshire Flyer - An Amtrak-operated train between New York City and Pittsfield, Massachusetts, which runs on summer weekends and was modeled after the CapeFlyer.
