= Watuppa Branch =

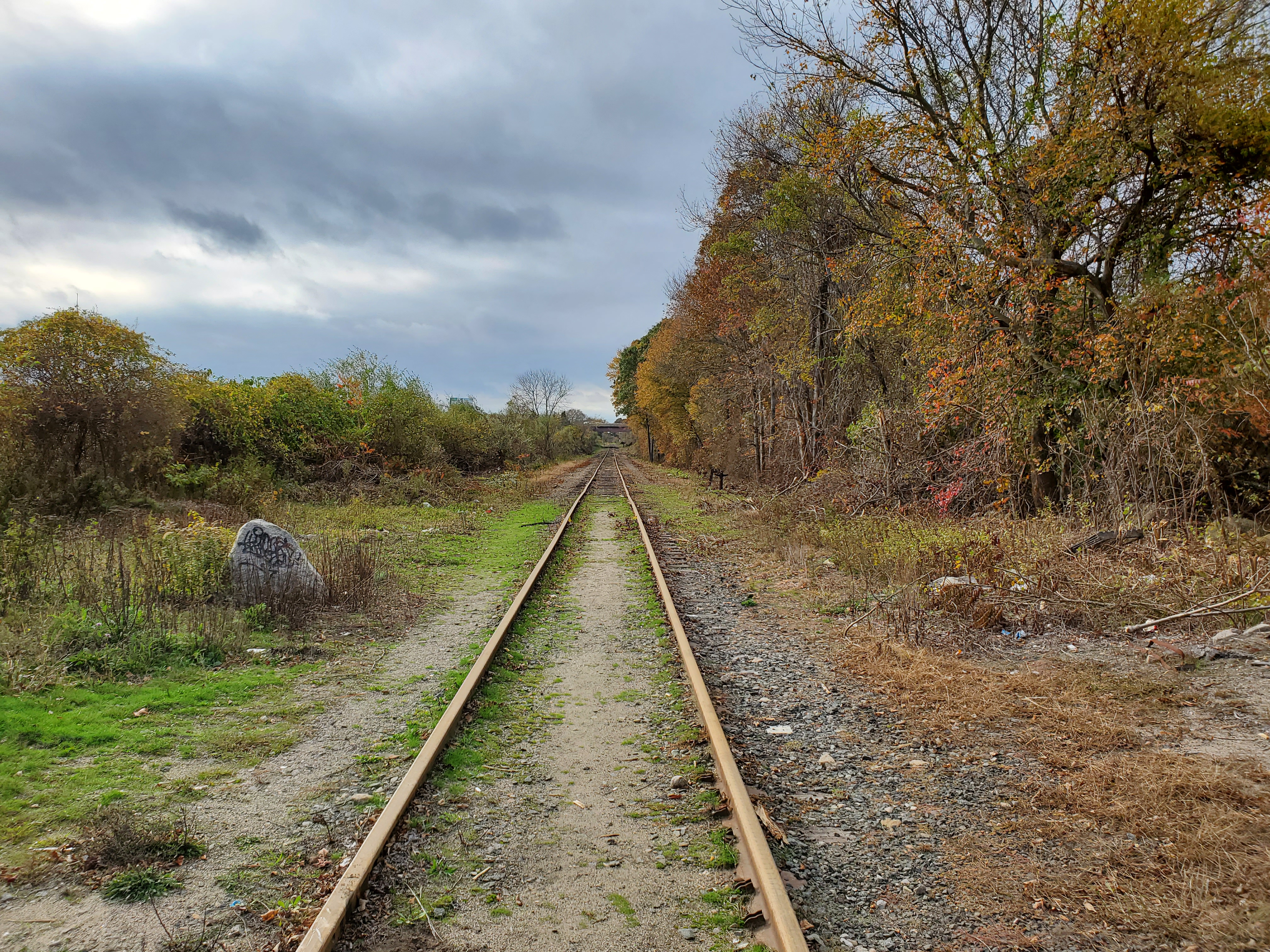
- The Watuppa Branch in New Bedford in 2020

Overview
- Other name(s): North Dartmouth Industrial Track, Fall River Branch
- Owner: Massachusetts Coastal Railroad, MassDOT
- Locale: Bristol County, Massachusetts
- Termini: Mount Pleasant Junction; North Westport (active track) Watuppa station, Fall River (former)

Service
- Operator(s): Massachusetts Coastal Railroad

Technical
- Line length: Active: 8.3 miles (13.4 km); Total: 12.1 miles (19.5 km)
- Number of tracks: 1
- Track gauge: 4 ft 8 1/2 in (1,435 mm) standard gauge

The Watuppa Branch (also called the North Dartmouth Industrial Track, and formerly the Fall River Branch) is a roughly six-mile freight railroad line in southeastern Massachusetts. The track originates at Mount Pleasant Junction, where it diverges from the New Bedford Secondary, and runs through Dartmouth before terminating in north Westport. The line is owned by the Massachusetts Department of Transportation and is operated by Massachusetts Coastal Railroad, which purchased operating rights from the previous operator, Bay Colony Railroad, in late 2023. The abandoned western portion of the right-of-way is used by the Quequechan River Rail Trail.

== Route ==
The Watuppa Branch originates in New Bedford, where it diverges from the New Bedford Secondary and passes beneath Massachusetts Route 140. After traveling through the western portion of downtown New Bedford, the railroad crosses into Dartmouth and travels just north of downtown, passing through the "Dartmouth Business Park II" before crossing into Westport. After crossing the border, the track passes beneath Interstate 195 and continues for just over a mile, until passing beneath Massachusetts Route 88, at which point active trackage ends and only abandoned, disused track remains. The disused track continues for another short distance until it terminates near Watuppa Ponds, at which point the Quequechan River Rail Trail eventually takes over where the track formerly laid.

== History ==
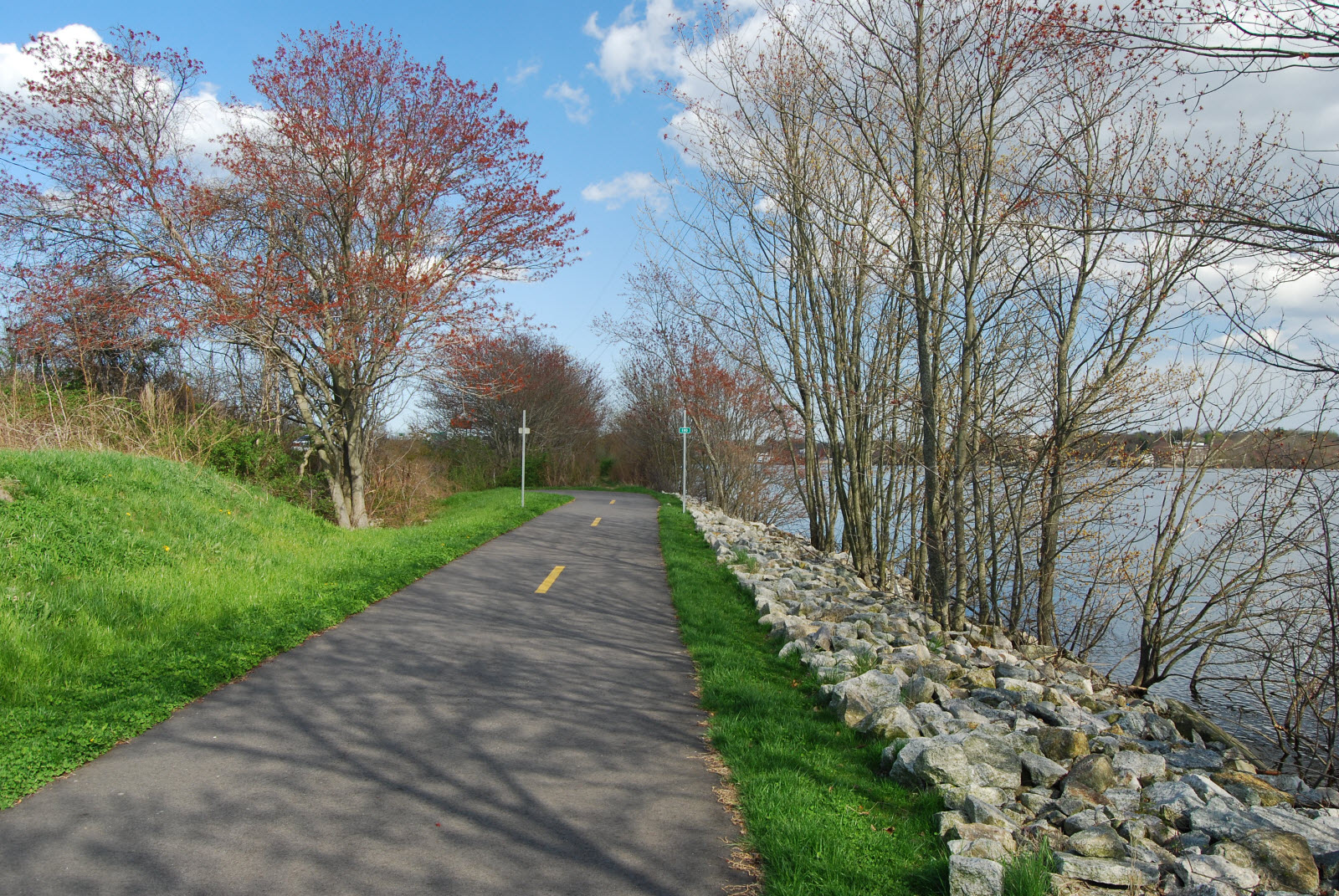
Bike path constructed over a portion of the former Fall River Railroad right-of-way, near South Watuppa Pond, Fall River, Massachusetts

The Fall River Railroad was chartered in 1874 and opened in 1875 from the New Bedford Railroad at New Bedford to Fall River through the towns of Dartmouth and Westport. The line was built to provide rail access to the mills in the eastern part of Fall River along the Quequechan River valley. The western terminus of the line was Watuppa station at Plymouth Avenue near Front Street. In 1882, the line was leased to the Old Colony Railroad for 99 years; it was sold outright to the Old Colony in 1896. The track between Westport and Fall River was eventually removed; the current track ends shortly after the Massachusetts Route 88 crossing in the town of Westport.

Beginning in 1982, Bay Colony Railroad took over all freight operations on the line. While most of Bay Colony's operations were subsequently taken over by Massachusetts Coastal Railroad in 2007, the Watuppa Branch remained under the operation of Bay Colony. In November 2023, the Massachusetts Coastal indicated it would be purchasing the line and taking over operations. Operations under Massachusetts Coastal began later that year.

In 2008, the first section of the Quequechan Rail Trail opened over a portion of the former Fall River Railroad right-of-way along the shore of South Watuppa Pond east of Brayton Avenue at a cost of $462,000. It was later extended west to Britland Park and Rodman Street. State funding was awarded in 2022 for a 550 feet (170 m) extension east to the Westport town line.
