= Bay Colony Railroad =

Shortline railroad (STB Class III) operating in Massachusetts

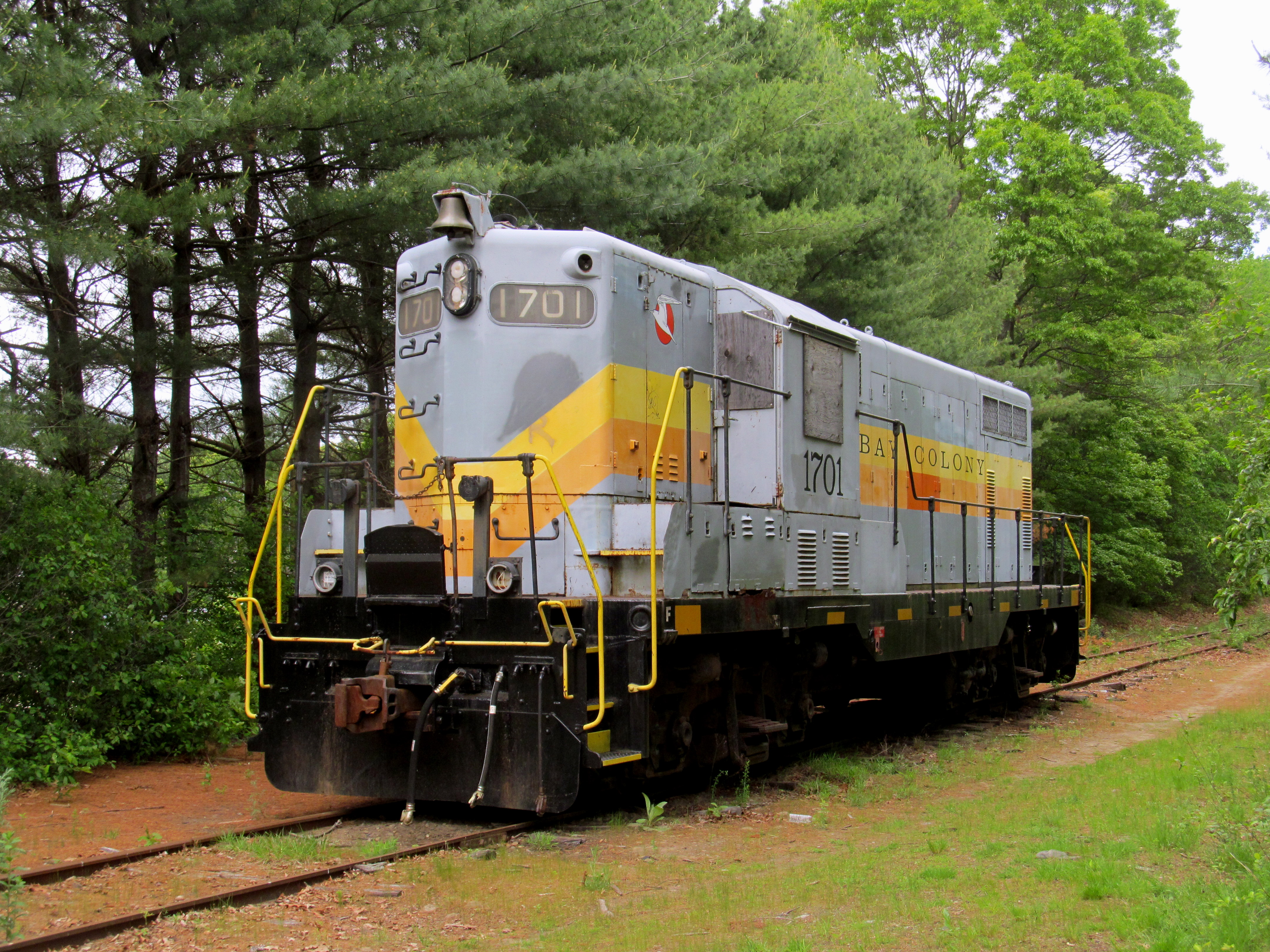
- Bay Colony Railroad locomotive in Medfield, Massachusetts, in 2017

Overview
- Headquarters: Braintree, Massachusetts
- Reporting mark: BCLR
- Locale: Massachusetts
- Dates of operation: 1982–2023
- Predecessor: Conrail
- Successor: Massachusetts Coastal Railroad

Technical
- Track gauge: 4 ft 8 1/2 in (1,435 mm) standard gauge
- Length: 34 miles (55 km)

Other
- Website: www.baycolonyrailroad.com

The Bay Colony Railroad (reporting mark BCLR) was a shortline railroad (STB Class III) operating in Massachusetts.

Formerly operating along most of the south coast region (including all lines on Cape Cod), Bay Colony's final operations ceased in late 2023, when the only two remaining lines (a roughly six-mile stretch of track between New Bedford and Westport, referred to as the Watuppa Branch, as well as a section of the Millis Branch from Medfield Junction to Millis) were purchased by Massachusetts Coastal Railroad.

In addition to moving freight for its customers, Bay Colony also performed AAR-certified repairs on rolling stock and contract track construction projects for other railroads. It had a sister railroad, the Seminole Gulf Railway, which is based out of Fort Myers, Florida.

== History ==
Bay Colony Railroad's original logo, marked on boxcar livery up through the mid-nineties

The Bay Colony railroad was chartered on March 31, 1977, with the intent of taking over freight service on former New Haven lines from Conrail, which was planning to abandon service. The lines were purchased by the state government, and Bay Colony took over all freight operations on the lines on June 12, 1982, with a 25-year contract.

Bay Colony expressed interest in purchasing the Belfast and Moosehead Lake Railroad in 1983.

The contract for the railroad lines owned by the Commonwealth of Massachusetts administered by the Executive Office of Transportation (EOT), which included the Cape Cod main expired on December 31, 2007. It was awarded to a new company, the Massachusetts Coastal Railroad, which took over on January 1, 2008. At that time the Bay Colony ceased operation on those lines, but continued to maintain operations in other areas of the state, namely the Millis branch (until 2018) and the Watuppa branch. The Bay Colony Railroad maintained its headquartered in Braintree, Massachusetts, and owned 6 miles (9.7 km) of active trackage within Massachusetts.

Bay Colony continued operations along the Millis Branch, a roughly eight-mile segment of track between Needham Junction and the former Millis station. This line interchanged with CSX at Medfield. The last train between Needham and Medfield ran in 2006, and this section was abandoned in 2008. Owned by the MBTA, this section became the Bay Colony Rail Trail. By May 2018, Bay Colony had ceased regular operations of this branch from Millis to Medfield following the closure of GAF Roofing, the biggest customer on the line. Bay Colony also operated along the Watuppa Branch (also referred to as the North Dartmouth Industrial Track), a roughly six-mile stretch of track in the south coast of the state. The branch diverges from the New Bedford Secondary and passes through the town of Dartmouth before terminating in Westport. Interchange was with Mass Coastal in New Bedford.

In November 2023, Mass Coastal indicated that it had agreed to purchase the Millis Branch and Watuppa Branch from Bay Colony and operate the lines, ending all remaining operations by the Bay Colony. However, on December 15, the Surface Transportation Board (STB) rejected the transfer of Millis Branch operations due to uncertainty about the status of the line. Mass Coastal announced the purchase of the Bay Colony was final in February 2024, excluding the Millis Branch which remained held up by legal issues. The STB approved the Millis Branch transfer in June 2024.

== See also ==
- Cape Cod Canal Railroad Bridge
