= Cape Cod Canal Railroad Bridge =

Movable railroad bridge in Massachusetts

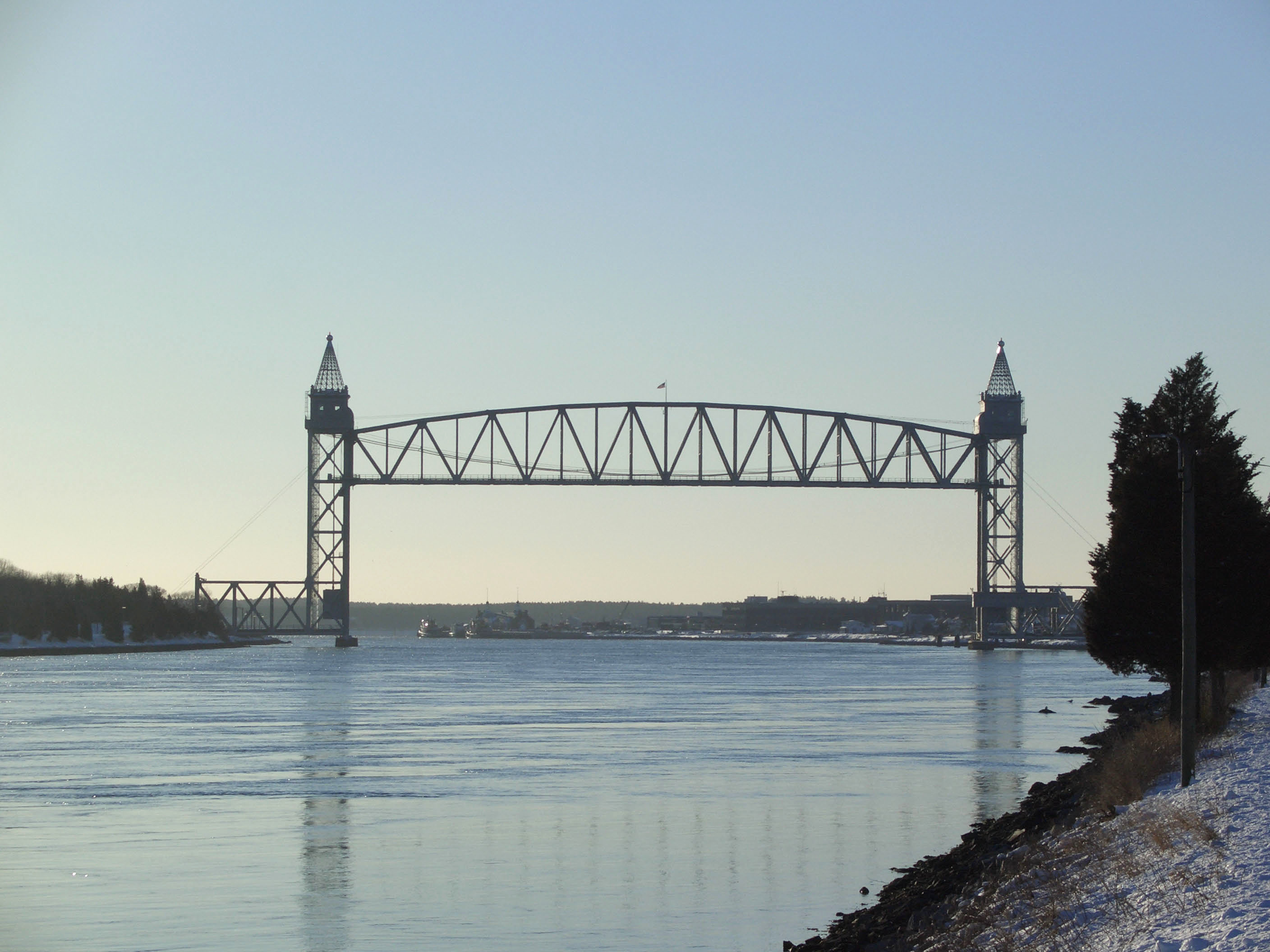
- Cape Cod Canal Railroad Bridge in 2005
- Coordinates: 41°44′31″N 70°36′49″W
- Carries: CapeFLYER Cape Cod Central Railroad Mass Coastal Railroad
- Crosses: Cape Cod Canal
- Locale: Bourne, Massachusetts
- Maintained by: United States Army Corps of Engineers

Characteristics
- Design: Vertical lift bridge
- Width: 27 feet (8.2 m)
- Height: 271 feet (83 m) (towers)
- Longest span: 544 feet (166 m)
- Clearance below: 135 feet (41 m) (raised)

History
- Construction start: December 18, 1933
- Opened: December 29, 1935

Location
- Interactive map of Cape Cod Canal Railroad Bridge

The Cape Cod Canal Railroad Bridge (also known as the Buzzards Bay Railroad Bridge) is a vertical lift bridge in Bourne, Massachusetts near Buzzards Bay that carries railroad traffic across the Cape Cod Canal, connecting Cape Cod with the mainland.

== Design and construction ==
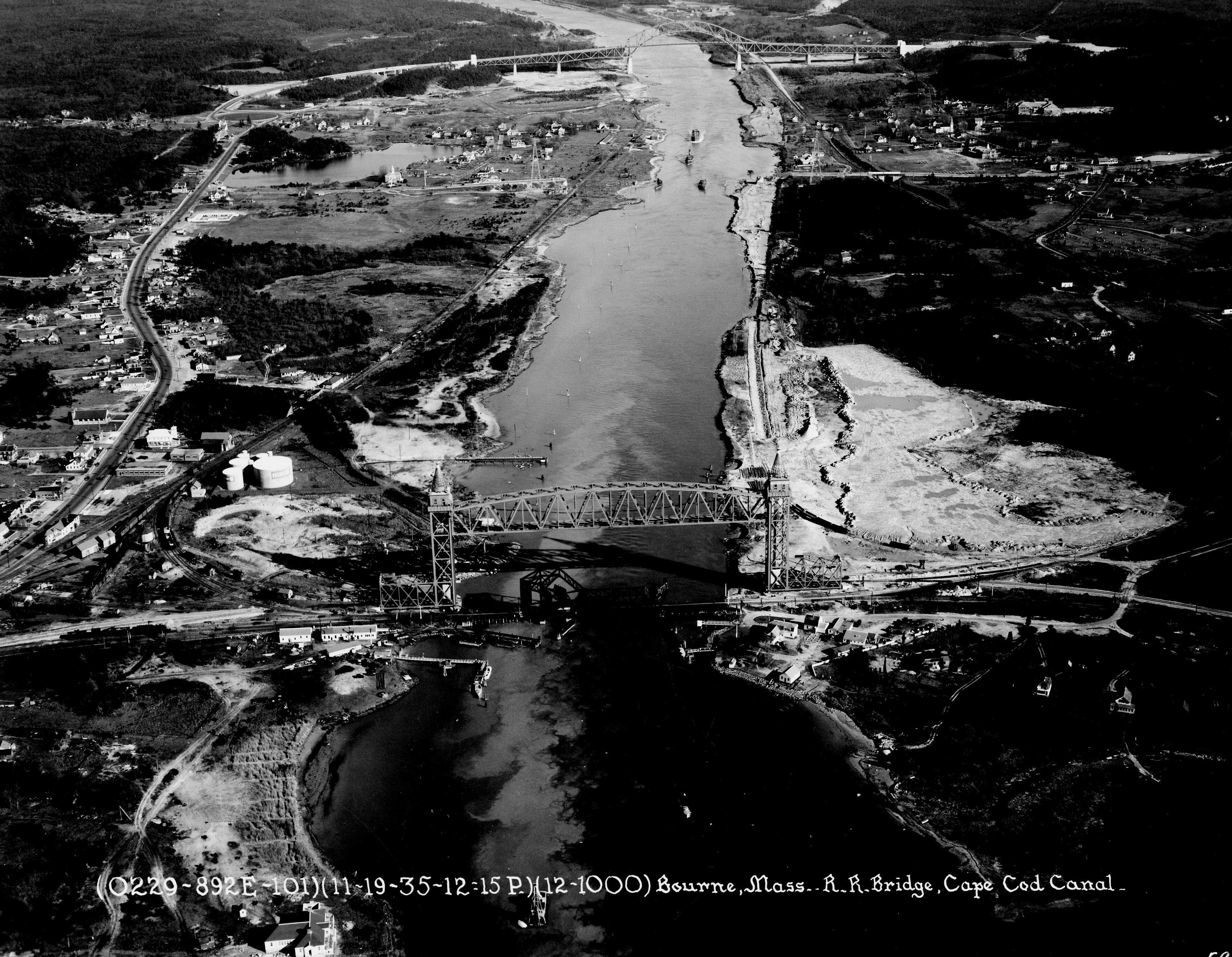
Bridge after construction, December 1935

The bridge was constructed beginning in 1933 by the Public Works Administration from a design by firms Parsons, Klapp, Brinckerhoff, and Douglas as well as Mead and White (both of New York), for the United States Army Corps of Engineers, which operates both the bridge and the canal.

The bridge has a 544-foot (166 m) main span, with a 135-foot (41 m) clearance when raised, uses 1,100-short-ton (1,000 t) counterweights on each end, and opened on December 29, 1935. The bridge replaced a bascule bridge that had been built in 1910.

At the time of its completion, it was the longest vertical lift span in the world. It is now the second longest lift bridge in the United States, the longest being the Arthur Kill Vertical Lift Bridge between New Jersey and Staten Island, New York.

== Maintenance and use ==
The bridge is owned, operated and maintained by the US Army Corps of Engineers. In 2002, the bridge underwent a major rehabilitation, including replacement of cables, machinery, and electrical systems, at a cost of $30 million and was reopened in 2003.

The rail line on either side of the bridge is owned by Massachusetts Department of Transportation, and is used year-round by the Massachusetts Coastal Railroad for their refuse trains and other freight operations. The bridge is also used by seasonal tourist trains operated by the Cape Cod Central Railroad, as well as the MBTA's seasonal CapeFLYER service, which runs between Boston and Hyannis.

== See also ==
- List of bridges documented by the Historic American Engineering Record in Massachusetts
- List of crossings of the Cape Cod Canal
