= Cape Cod Regional Transit Authority =

Bus transit system in Massachusetts, US

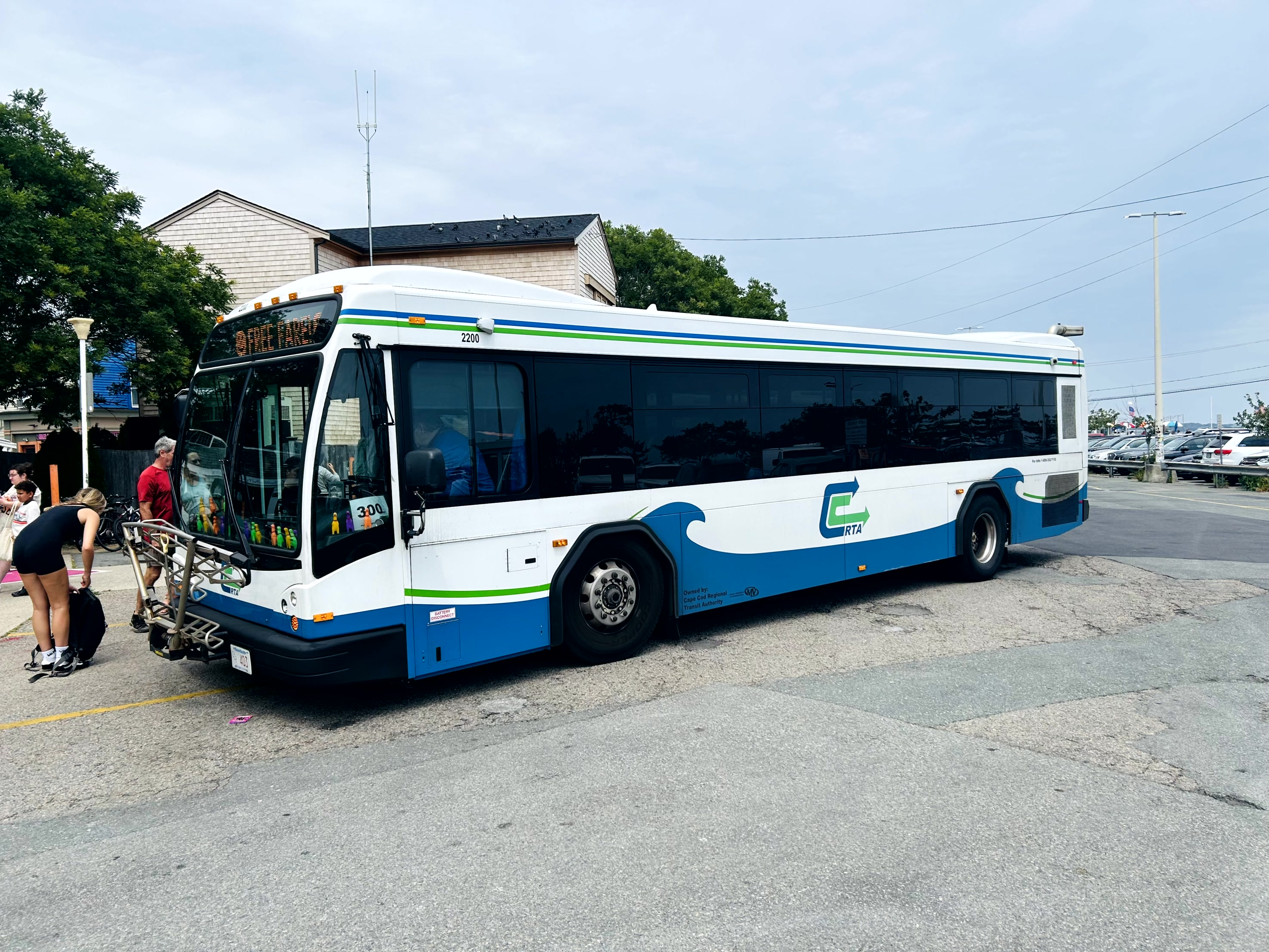
- CCRTA bus in Provincetown in 2025
- Founded: 1976
- Headquarters: Hyannis, Massachusetts
- Service area: Barnstable County, Massachusetts
- Service type: public transit
- Hubs: Hyannis Transportation Center, Orleans Stop and Shop
- Daily ridership: 550,000 (annual; 2010)
- Operator: MV Transportation
- Administrator: John Kennedy
- Website: Capecodrta.org

Cape Cod Regional Transit Authority (CCRTA) operates a bus transit system of fixed and flexible routes, seasonal rail service to Boston, and a paratransit service in the Cape Cod region of Massachusetts. The CCRTA was created under the provisions of Chapter 161B of the Massachusetts General Laws in 1976. Its main hub and base of operations is the Hyannis Transportation Center on Main Street in Hyannis, Massachusetts.

Scheduled route service (called The Breeze until early 2008) consists of seven year-round lines covering every town on mainland Cape Cod. During the summer months (late June through early September) service runs seven days a week from approximately 5:30 am until midnight, and is complemented by local shuttles in downtown Hyannis, Provincetown, and Woods Hole. Service is somewhat reduced in the shoulder season (Memorial Day to late June and Labor Day to Columbus Day) and is limited in the off season when four of the eight routes do not run and the remainder only operate 5:30 am to 8 pm, Monday through Friday with most routes having reduced service on Saturday.

== Service information ==
Route Name	Termini		Notes
Year-Round Routes
Sealine	Hyannis	Main Street, Falmouth	Continues to Woods Hole if the WHOOSH isn't running. One morning inbound trip continues to the Sturgis Charter School.
H2O	Hyannis	Orleans	One morning inbound trip continues to the Sturgis Charter School.
Barnstable Villager	Hyannis	Barnstable County Complex	Stops North of Bearses Way are by request on weekends during the off season. Continues to Barnstable Harbor by request during the summer. Stops at the airport by request on all runs.
Hyannis Crosstown	Hyannis	Village Green Apartments	Service via Cape Cod Mall
The Flex	Dennis Port	North Truro	Continues to Bradford Street in Provincetown if The Shuttle isn't running.
The Bourne Run	Buzzards Bay	Mashpee Commons	
The Sandwich Line	Hyannis	Sagamore Park and Ride	One morning inbound trip continues to the Sturgis Charter School
Summer and "Shoulder Season" Routes
Provincetown Shuttle	North Truro	Race Point Beach / First Pilgrims Park	Weekends only during the shoulder season. First Pilgrims Park service is limited
Summer Routes
Hyannis Trolley	Hyannis	Kalmus Beach	Free shuttle serving Veterans Park Beach, Kalmus Beach, and Sea Street Beach as well as various points on Main Street.
WHOOSH Trolley	Main Street Falmouth	Steamship Authority Docks	

=== The Flex ===
The Flex is unique in that passengers may board or disembark up to 3/4 mile from the actual route itself. Off-route pickups can be scheduled by calling CCRTA customer service. Higher fares apply when boarding or disembarking off-route.

=== DART ===
DART or "Dial a Ride Transportation" (formerly known as the "B-Bus") is the authority's federally mandated door to door paratransit service. Unlike many transit agencies (such as MBTA's THE RIDE) riders do not need to qualify on the basis of disability or income, and any person who resides within CCRTA's service area can utilize DART. Fares are $3 each way or $1.50 for seniors and disabled, and unlike fixed route service, DART can be scheduled on Sundays.

=== SmartDART ===
SmartDART operates microtransit service within all towns on Cape Cod. Service operates weekdays in all member towns with Saturday service in Barnstable, Dennis, Falmouth, Sandwich and Yarmouth.

=== CapeFLYER ===
The CapeFLYER service is scheduled passenger rail service that runs between South Station in Boston and the Hyannis Transportation Center. The service operates on Friday evenings and on weekends from Memorial Day through Labor Day.

== Fares ==
Distance based fares were eliminated in 2006. RFID equipped electronic fareboxes, which accepted Charlie Cards or cash, were introduced in 2012.

In June of 2025, the CCRTA began transitioning to a fare-free system for its fixed routes.
