= Massachusetts Coastal Railroad =

Railroad in Massachusetts

Overview
- Headquarters: Taunton, Massachusetts
- Reporting mark: MC
- Locale: Massachusetts
- Dates of operation: 2007–present
- Predecessor: Bay Colony Railroad

Technical
- Track gauge: 4 ft 8 1/2 in (1,435 mm) standard gauge
- Length: 135 Miles

Other
- Website: masscoastal.com

The Massachusetts Coastal Railroad (reporting mark MC) is a Class III railroad serving south-eastern Massachusetts. It is headquartered in Taunton, Massachusetts. The railroad maintains track from Hyannis to Framingham, operating over 135 miles of track between Hyannis and Fall River/New Bedford. The railroad is the successor operator of portions of the Bay Colony Railroad.

== History ==
On December 31, 2007, the contract to operate the freight railroad lines owned by the Commonwealth of Massachusetts administered by the Executive Office of Transportation (EOT) expired. These railroad lines included the Cape Main Line, as well as several shorter lines both on Cape Cod and in Southeastern Massachusetts. The new contract was awarded to a new company, the Massachusetts Coastal Railroad, which took over on January 1, 2008. At that time, the Bay Colony ceased operations on those lines, but continued to operate in other areas of the Commonwealth, including on the Watuppa Branch in Dartmouth and Westport, and the Millis Branch in Millis.

On November 16, 2023, the railroad indicated that it would be purchasing the Watuppa Branch and Millis Branch from the Bay Colony and taking over operations on the lines. The purchase of the Millis Branch was initially rejected by the Surface Transportation Board due to uncertainty about the status of the line, but the line's operations were ultimately taken over by Massachusetts Coastal later that year.

== Operations ==
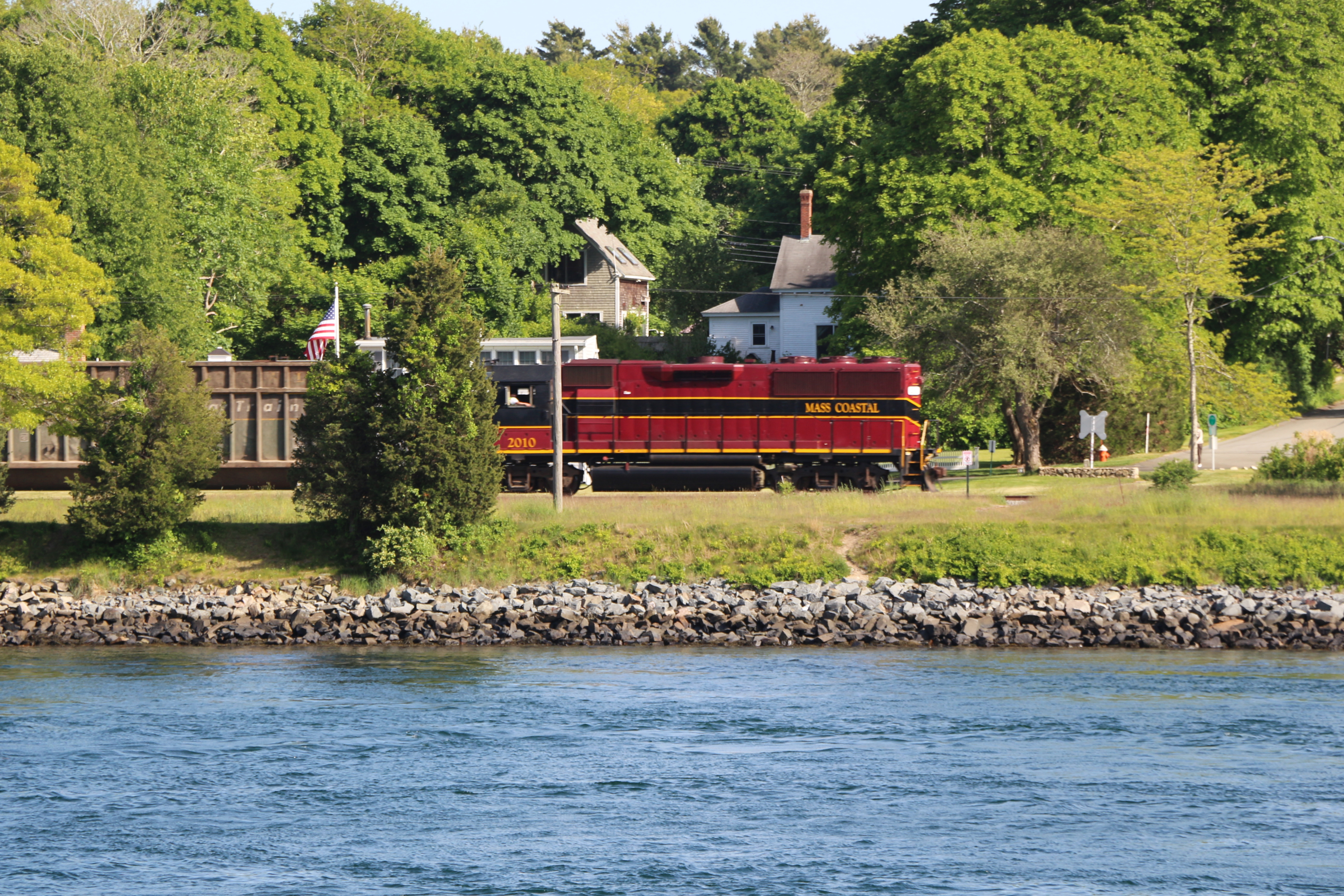
A Mass Coastal trash train running along the Cape Cod Canal in 2014

The railroad operates the "trash train" hauling refuse from the Upper Cape Regional Transfer Station in Falmouth and the Yarmouth-Barnstable Regional Transfer Station in Yarmouth to the Southeastern Massachusetts Resource Recovery Facility, a waste-to-energy plant in Rochester, MA, as did its predecessor. The operations occur entirely along the Cape Main Line, including the spur to Falmouth. However, Massachusetts Coastal operates the train under the new name, "Energy Train" using 20 former Canadian Pacific bath tub coal hopper cars rebuilt into "Energy" cars. These "Energy Cars" are numbered 1000–1019. These cars are painted in a Pullman green scheme with a black band. The first 6 cars were fully painted with "MASS COASTAL" lettering, and "ENERGY TRAIN" written along the sides and gold stripes. The remaining 14 cars are in an abbreviated scheme with no lettering or stripes. This was done to speed up the delivery process. As of January 2015, the Energy Train operates Monday through Friday in the morning and afternoon.

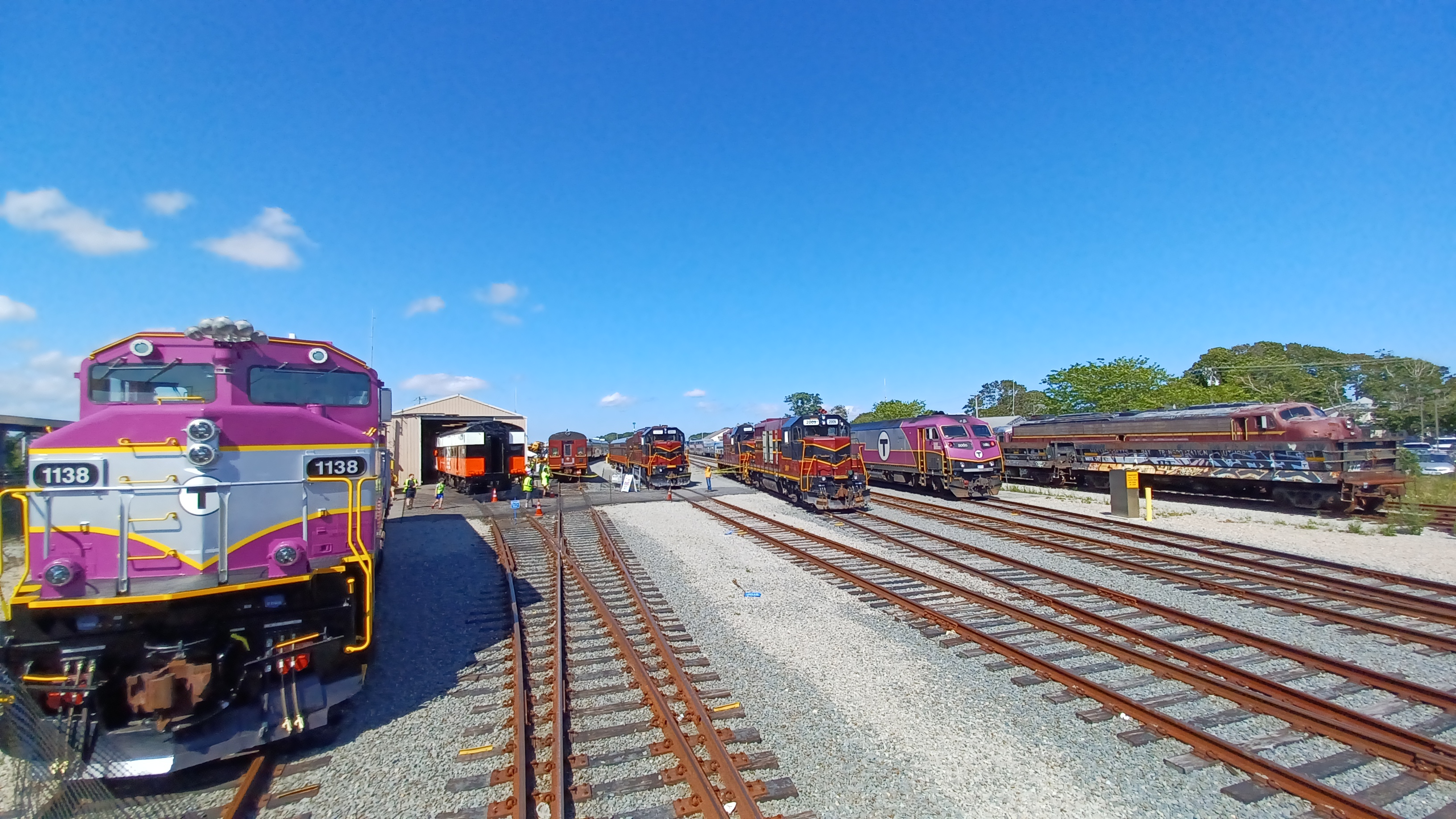
Massachusetts Coastal Railroad, MBTA, and Cape Cod Central Railroad equipment at Hyannis in August 2023

In addition to the energy train, Mass Coastal offers general freight transport for companies based on Cape Cod and the south coast, specifically along the Cape Main, Middleboro Secondary, New Bedford Subdivision, Fall River Secondary, and the Dean Street Industrial Track (the latter of which is located in Taunton). Interchanges are done with CSX in Middleboro several times a week, to allow for long-distance shipping to and from the region. Operations in Fall River, New Bedford, and Taunton can be seen some days Monday through Friday.

Mass Coastal does not operate freight trains on Sundays or holidays unless needed.

The Cape Cod Central Railroad is owned by the same parent company, and operates passenger trains as a heritage railroad. A plan to start "Mass Coastal" commuter rail service between Middleborough and Buzzards Bay or Sandwich in 2010 has not been implemented as of 2023, but the seasonal CapeFLYER train started running to Hyannis in the summer of 2013.

In 2012, Chicago-based Iowa Pacific Holdings acquired Cape Rail, Inc and its subsidiaries Mass Coastal and Cape Cod Central.

After Iowa Pacific collapsed in 2020, MassCoastal and Cape Cod Central were bought by P. Christopher Podgurski, a Cape Cod native.

Mass Coastal took over CSX tracks from Taunton, Massachusetts to Fall River and New Bedford, Massachusetts. The railroad continues to operate track south from the connection with CSX at Cotley Junction in Taunton to both New Bedford and Fall River.

In late 2023, the last of Bay Colony's active lines (the Watuppa branch and the Millis Branch) were purchased by Massachusetts Coastal. The STB approved the Millis Branch transfer in June 2024 after a delay due to uncertainty about the status of the line.
