= West Barnstable station =

Railway station in West Barnstable, Massachusetts

West Barnstable, MA
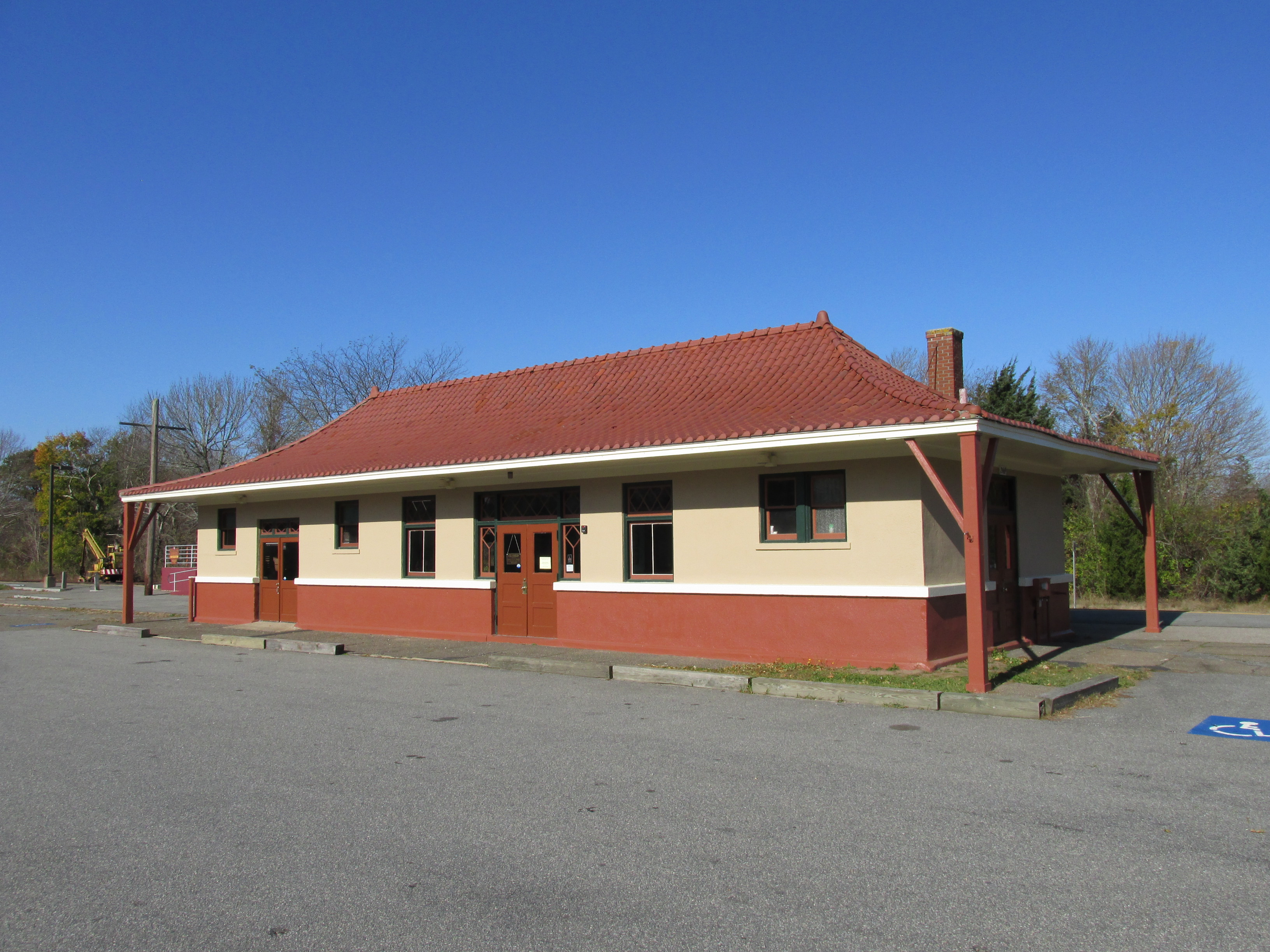
- West Barnstable station in 2012

General information
- Location: 2469 Meetinghouse Way (Route 149); West Barnstable, Massachusetts
- Coordinates: 41°42′25″N 70°22′27″W
- Owner: Town of Barnstable, Massachusetts
- Line: Cape Main Line
- Platforms: 1 side platform

Construction
- Parking: Small lot
- Accessible: Yes

History
- Rebuilt: 1911, 1980s

Services
Preceding station	Cape Cod Central Railroad	Following station
Sandwich toward Buzzards Bay	Main Line	Hyannis Terminus
Former services
Preceding station	Amtrak	Following station
Sandwich toward New York	Cape Codder 1986–1996	Hyannis Terminus
Preceding station	Cape Cod and Hyannis Railroad	Following station
Sandwich toward Braintree or Attleboro	Braintree-Hyannis Closed 1988	Hyannis Terminus
Preceding station	New York, New Haven and Hartford Railroad	Following station
East Sandwich toward Boston	Boston–Hyannis	Barnstable toward Hyannis
East Sandwich toward Boston	Boston–Provincetown	Barnstable toward Provincetown
Sandwich toward New York	Cape Codder	Yarmouth toward Hyannis
Location

West Barnstable station is a railway station in West Barnstable, Massachusetts. The train station currently serves as a weekend stop for several excursion trains operated by the Cape Cod Central Railroad. The station building, which is owned by the Town of Barnstable, Massachusetts, is the headquarters on the Cape Cod Chapter of the National Railway Historical Society (NRHS).

== History ==
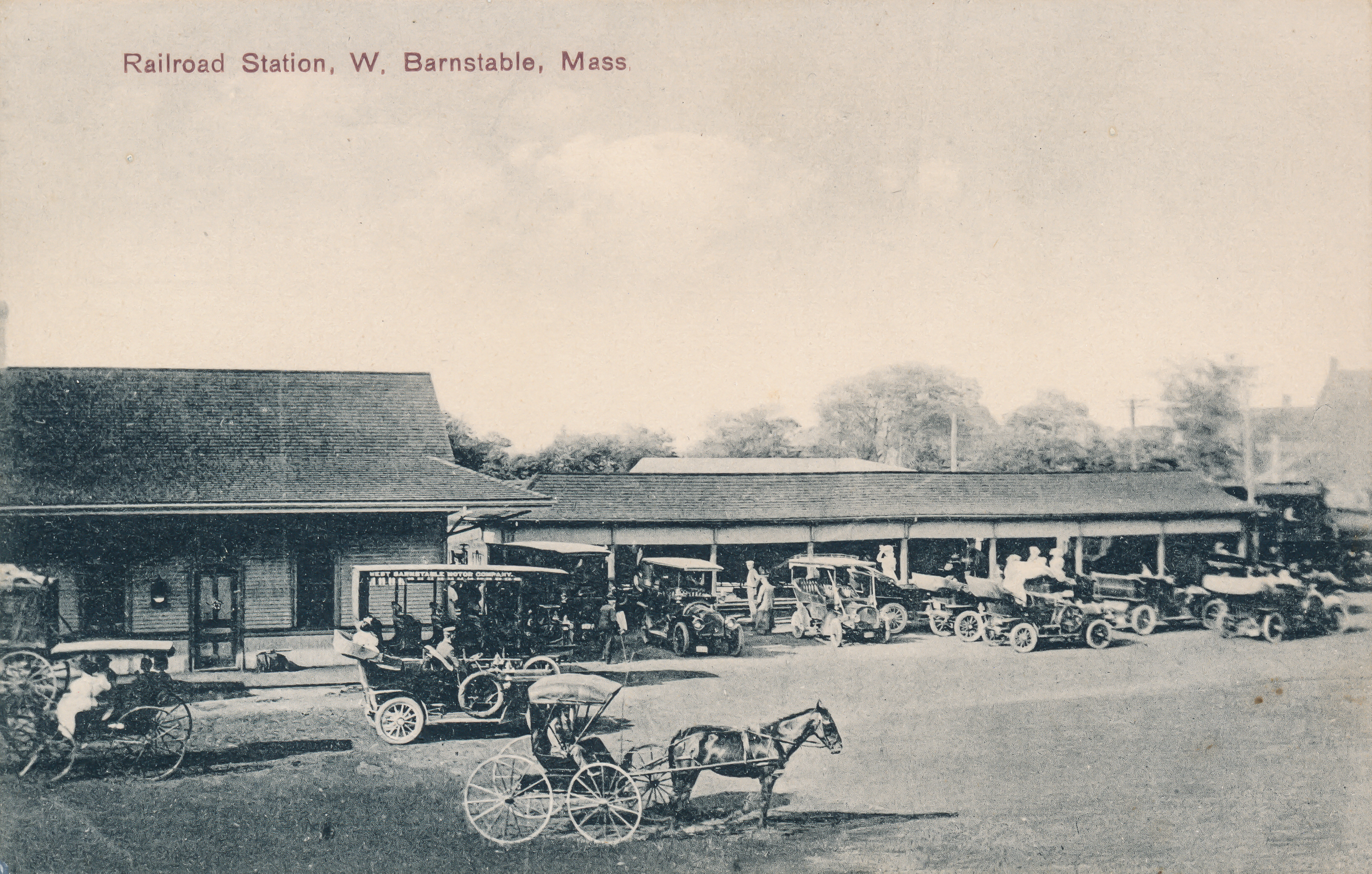
Postcard of original station, ca. 1905

The original passenger station in West Barnstable was opened in 1854 by the Cape Cod Railroad.

This station was torn down and a new station was built, at the same location, by the New Haven Railroad in 1911 at a cost of $18,000. The original architecture style of the station was identical to the stations that the New Haven Railroad built in Buzzards Bay and Sagamore around the same time.

The station served trains to Boston and seasonal trains to New York City and remained in service until 1964 when the New Haven Railroad ran its last passenger trains to Cape Cod including the Day Cape Codder. Between 1986 and 1996 it was an unstaffed station stop for Amtrak's Cape Codder service. It is one station that has been eliminated from the schedule of the seasonal Cape Flyer train service between Boston and Hyannis. From the 19th Century, under the Old Colony Railroad and until 1964 under the New York, New Haven and Hartford Railroad, passenger trains served Sandwich. Trains of the 1940s-1960s included the Day Cape Codder and the Neptune.

The property once included a detached freight house but it was torn down a few decades ago. The station was used as a shooting location for the films The Golden Boys (2008) and The Lightkeepers (2009). The Cape Cod Chapter of the NRHS signed a twenty-year lease on the building in 2012. They have been restoring it as a historical railway station and museum since 2001 when they became the custodian of the building. The station building, which is open to the public on Saturdays between May and October, also hosts numerous special events, including National Train Day in May, the West Barnstable village festival in August and the Cranberry Express in October.

During the summer, West Barnstable serves as a stop for select excursion trains running from Hyannis to the Cape Cod Canal, often including an additional stop at the historic Pairpoint Glass facility in Sagamore. Although trains depart from Hyannis every day of the week during the summer, West Barnstable is only served on Saturdays.
