= Onset station =

Former train station in Massachusetts

Onset
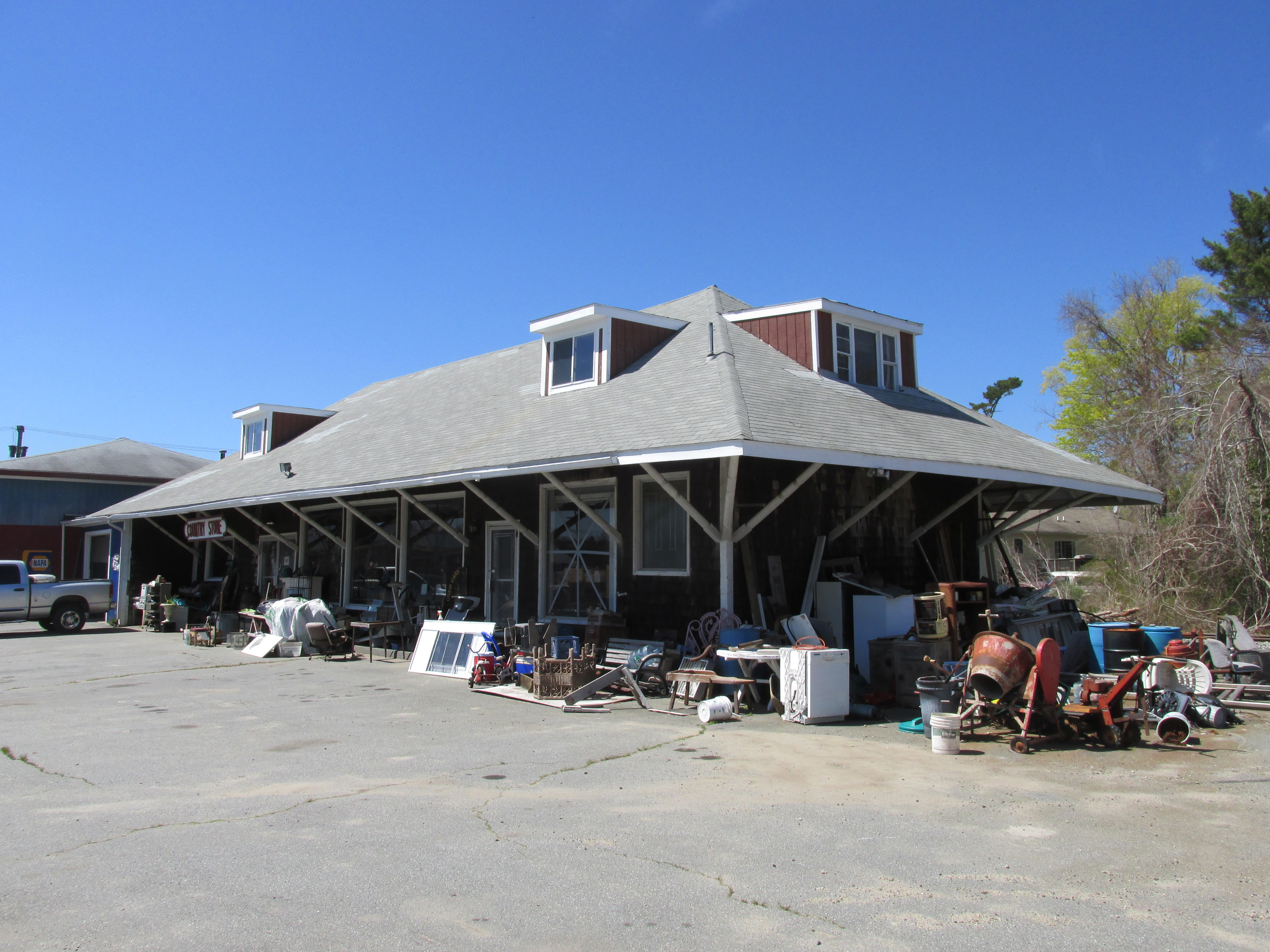
- The former station building in May 2013

General information
- Location: 447 Onset Avenue; Wareham, Massachusetts
- Coordinates: 41°45′25″N 70°40′33″W
- Line: Cape Main Line

Former services
Preceding station	New York, New Haven and Hartford Railroad	Following station
Wareham toward Boston	Boston–Woods Hole	Buzzards Bay toward Woods Hole
Wareham toward Boston	Boston–Hyannis	Buzzards Bay toward Hyannis
Wareham toward Boston	Boston–Provincetown	Buzzards Bay toward Provincetown
Wareham toward New York	Cape Codder until circa 1940s	Buzzards Bay toward Hyannis or Woods Hole
Location

Onset station is a former train station located on Depot Street in the village of East Wareham, Massachusetts. Originally known as Agawam, then East Wareham, it was combined with a nearby station under the name Onset Junction in 1891. Known as Onset by the 1930s, it was closed in 1959. The station building remains in use by a business.

== History ==
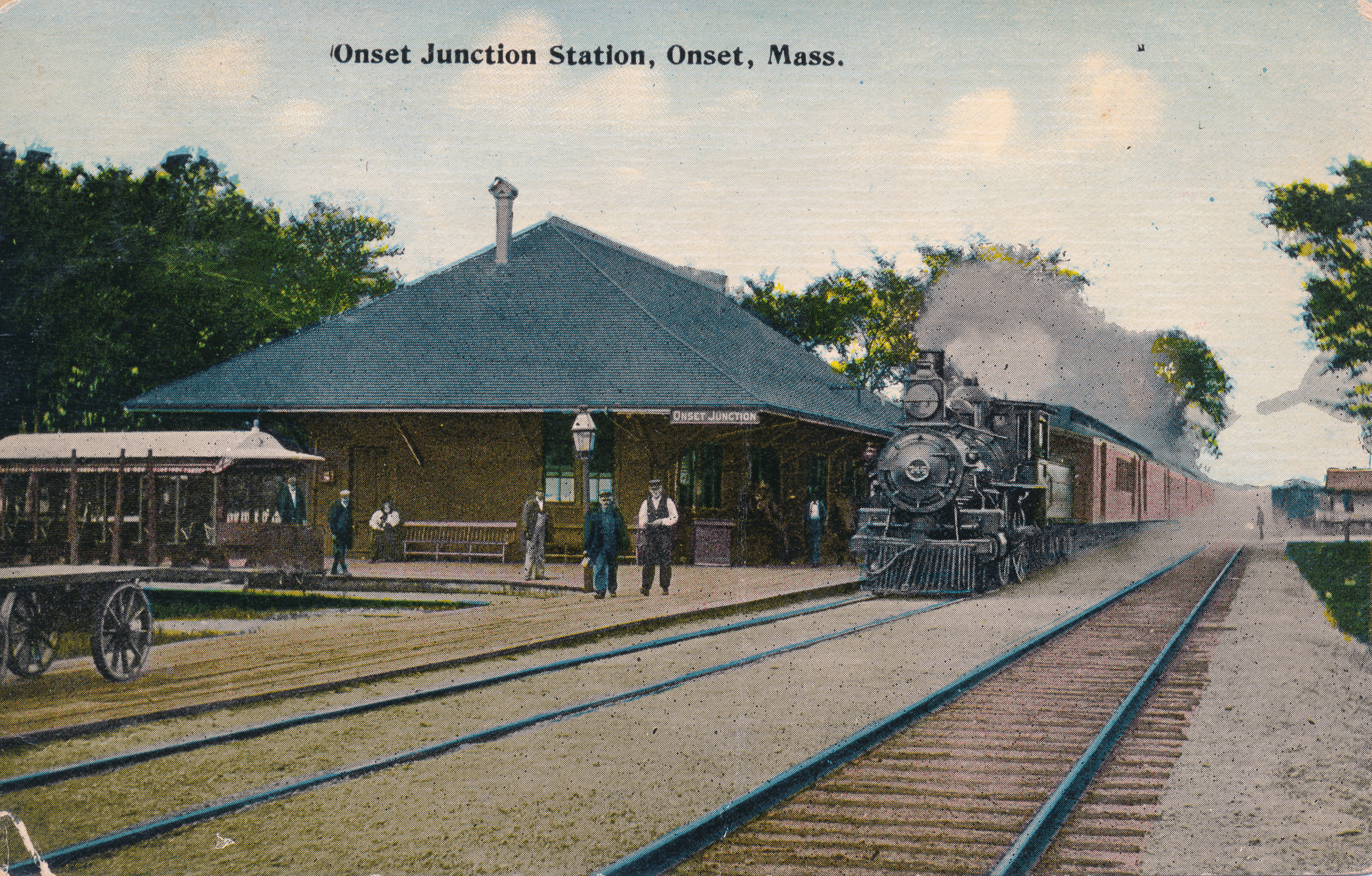
Onset Junction station around 1913, with a NB&O streetcar at left

The Cape Cod Railroad was extended from Wareham to Sandwich in May 1848. By 1857, Agawam station was located at Onset Avenue, serving its namesake village. The Cape Cod Railroad was acquired by the Old Colony Railroad in 1872. Onset Bay station, about 1.4 miles (2.3 km) east of Agawam at Main Avenue, was added by 1879.

In 1885, the Onset Bay Grove Railroad opened between Onset station (formerly Onset Bay) and Shell Point in Onset Bay Grove, a religious camp meeting site and summer resort. Later called the Onset Bay Street Railway, it operated horsecars and steam dummies. The Old Colony constructed a new station building at Onset in 1885 to serve transferring passengers.

Around 1888, the competing East Wareham, Onset Bay and Point Independence Street Railway opened between East Wareham station (formerly Agawam) and Onset Bay Grove. The Old Colony parked a railroad car at East Wareham in 1889 to serve as an expanded station. In May 1891, the two horsecar lines agreed to merge, which included the abandonment of the Onset Bay Street Railway line to Onset station. The station was closed; the station building was relocated to East Wareham and renamed Onset Junction. The existing East Wareham station was converted to a freight house.

The horsecar line was acquired by the New Bedford and Onset Street Railway (NB&O) and electrified in 1901. It had a short spur track leading directly to Onset Junction station. The NB&O was abandoned in 1927; by the 1930s, the station was again known simply as Onset. In 1936, the town proposed to move the station back to Main Avenue.

Onset was intermittently a stop for the Cape Codder and other New York–Cape Cod trains until at least the 1940s. Passenger service to Onset ended on June 30, 1959, when the New Haven ended passenger service on its Old Colony division. The former station building, still extant, is used by an antique store.
