= Hyannisport station =

Hyannisport
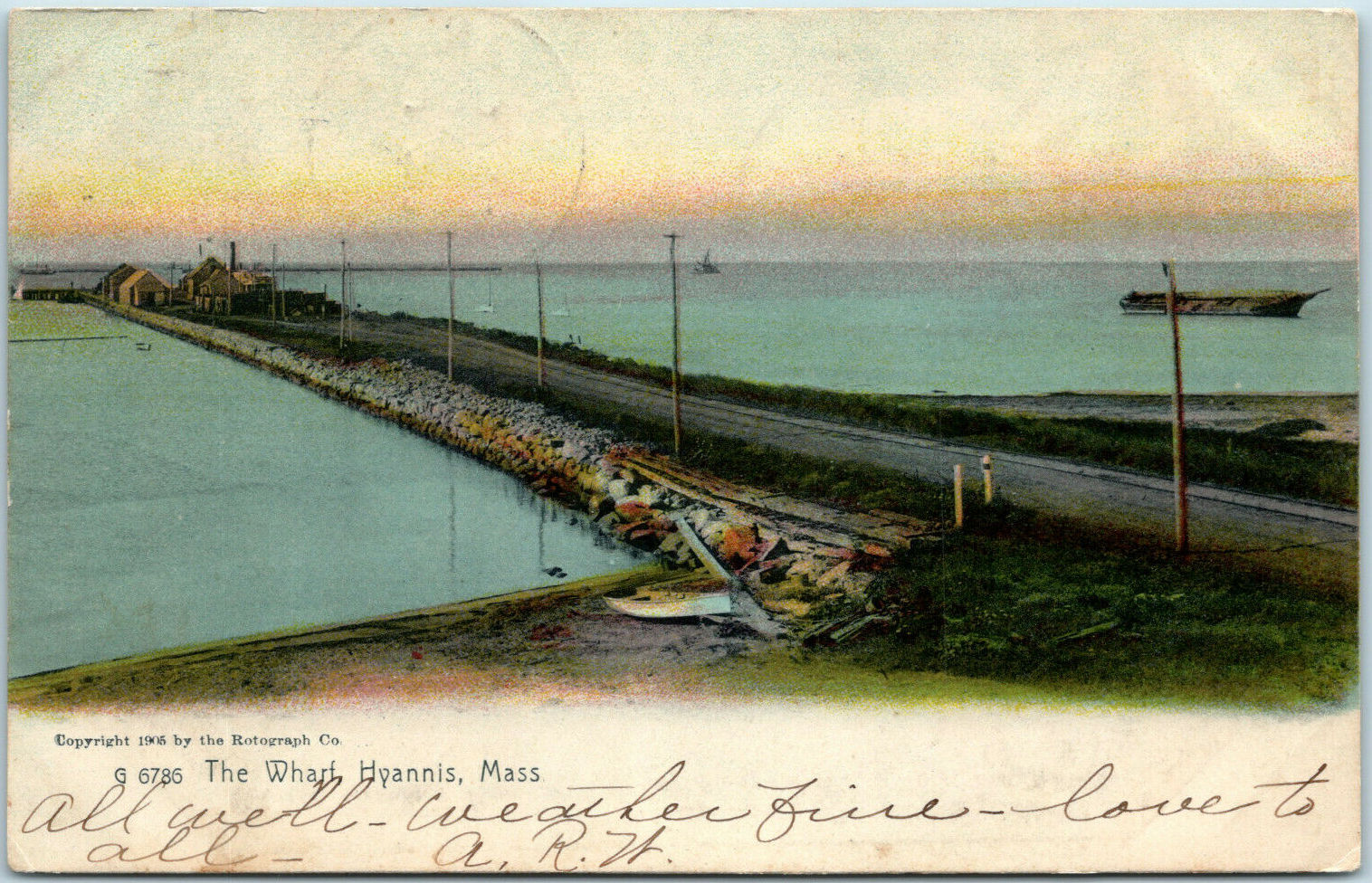
- Hyannisport Wharf on an early-20th-century postcard

General information
- Location: Hyannisport Wharf, Hyannisport, Massachusetts
- Coordinates: 41°38′00.17″N 70°17′20.78″W
- Line: Cape Cod Railroad Hyannis Branch
- Platforms: Yes

History
- Opened: July 1854
- Closed: July 1872
Location

Hyannisport Wharf was a railroad wharf in the Hyannisport section of Hyannis, Massachusetts.

== History ==
The Cape Cod Branch Railroad opened to Sandwich in May 1848. In 1850, the railroad was given permission to extend to Hyannis, where steamships could dock to reach Martha's Vineyard and Nantucket. After a debate whether the railroad should run directly from Sandwich to Hyannis, or take a longer route with stations at Barnstable and Yarmouth, the longer route was chosen. The Cape Cod Railroad (successor to the Cape Cod Branch Railroad) began service to Hyannisport Wharf in July 1854.

In July 1872, the railroad opened a branch line to Woods Hole, which provided a faster route to the islands. Hyannis Branch passenger service was cut back to Hyannis, though the wharf remained in use for freight. The Cape Cod Railroad became part of the Old Colony Railroad in 1872, and in turn part of the New York, New Haven and Hartford Railroad in 1893. The line between Hyannisport and Hyannis was abandoned in 1937; most of the right-of-way is now Old Colony Road, while part of the fill for the wharf remains extant.
