= Sagamore station =

Former train station in Sagamore, Massachusetts, US

Sagamore
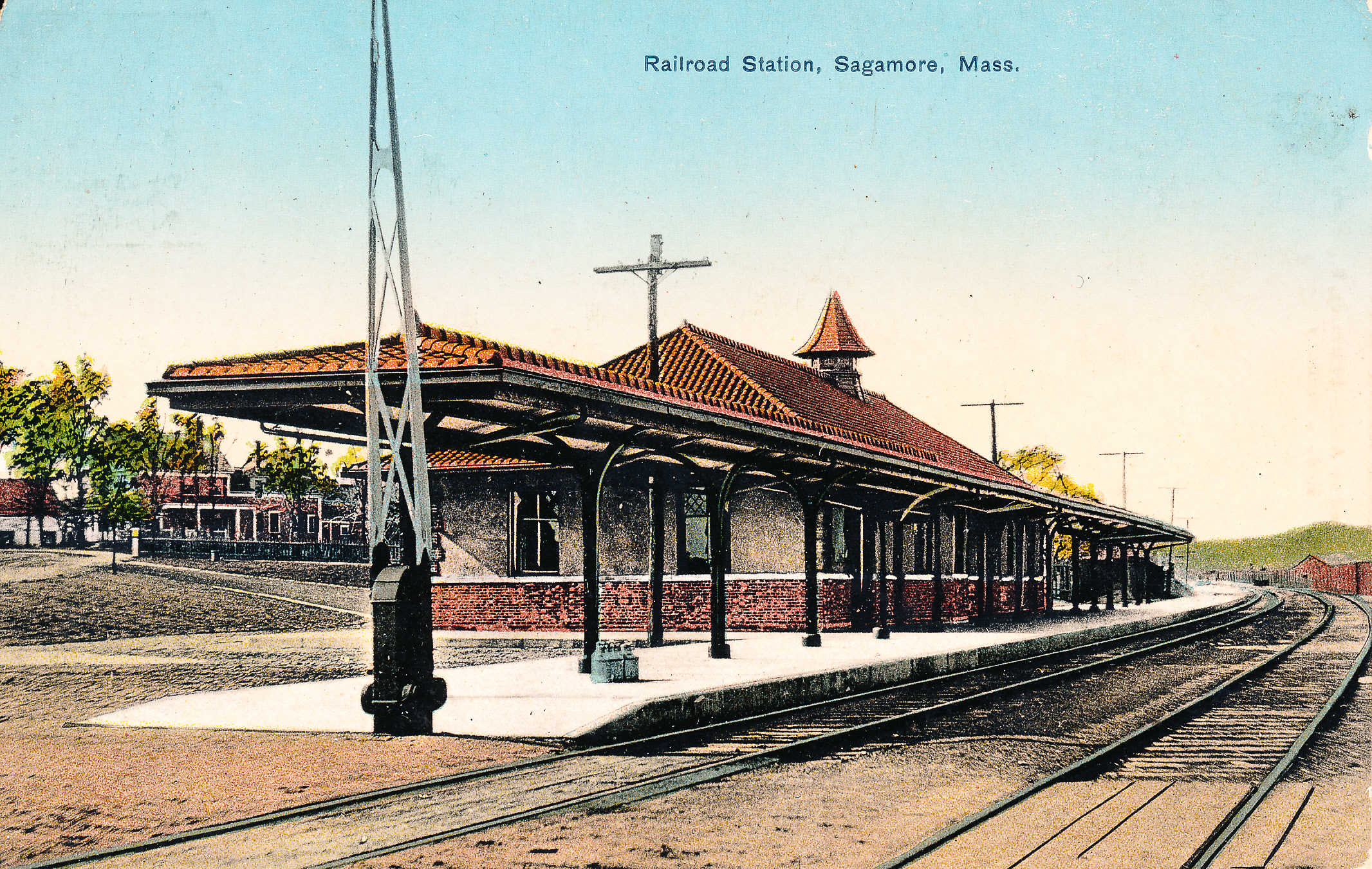
- Sagamore station around 1911

General information
- Location: Pleasant Street, Sagamore, Massachusetts
- Coordinates: 41°46′25.90″N 70°32′01.60″W
- Line: Cape Main Line

History
- Opened: c. 1909
- Closed: c. 1937

Former services
Preceding station	New York, New Haven and Hartford Railroad	Following station
Bourne toward Boston	Boston–Hyannis	Sandwich toward Hyannis
Bourne toward Boston	Boston–Provincetown	Sandwich toward Provincetown
Location

Sagamore station was a railroad station located on Pleasant Street in Sagamore, Massachusetts on Cape Cod. It was located across the tracks from the Keith Car & Manufacturing Company.

== History ==
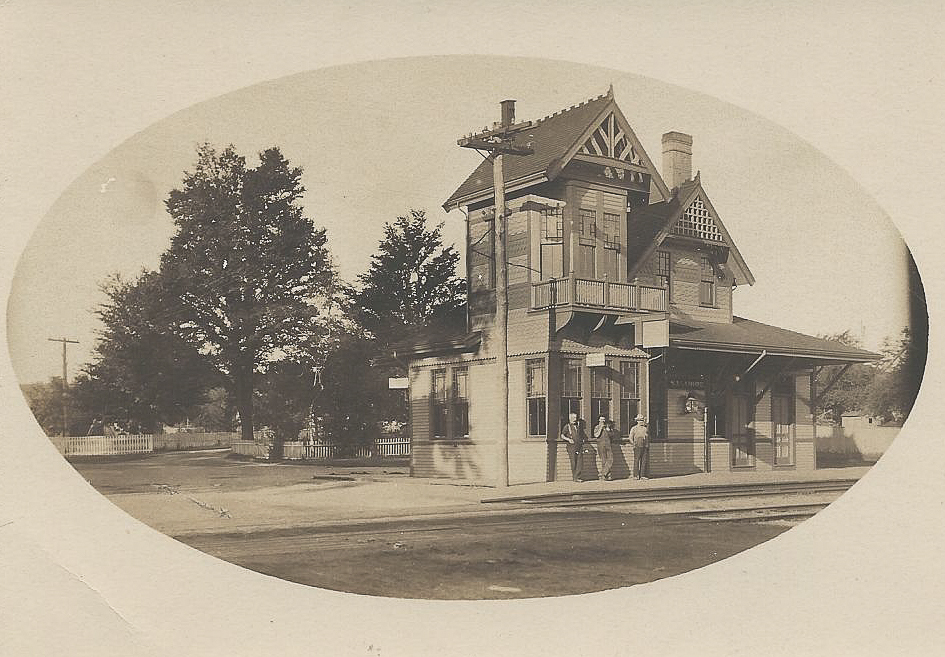
The original station around 1900

The original station was built by the Old Colony Railroad in 1886. The New York, New Haven & Hartford Railroad built a new brick station building in Sagamore in 1909 based on an architectural design that was similar to the Buzzards Bay and West Barnstable stations, both of which stand to this day. All that remains of the former Sagamore station is its foundation.
