= East Sandwich station =

East Sandwich
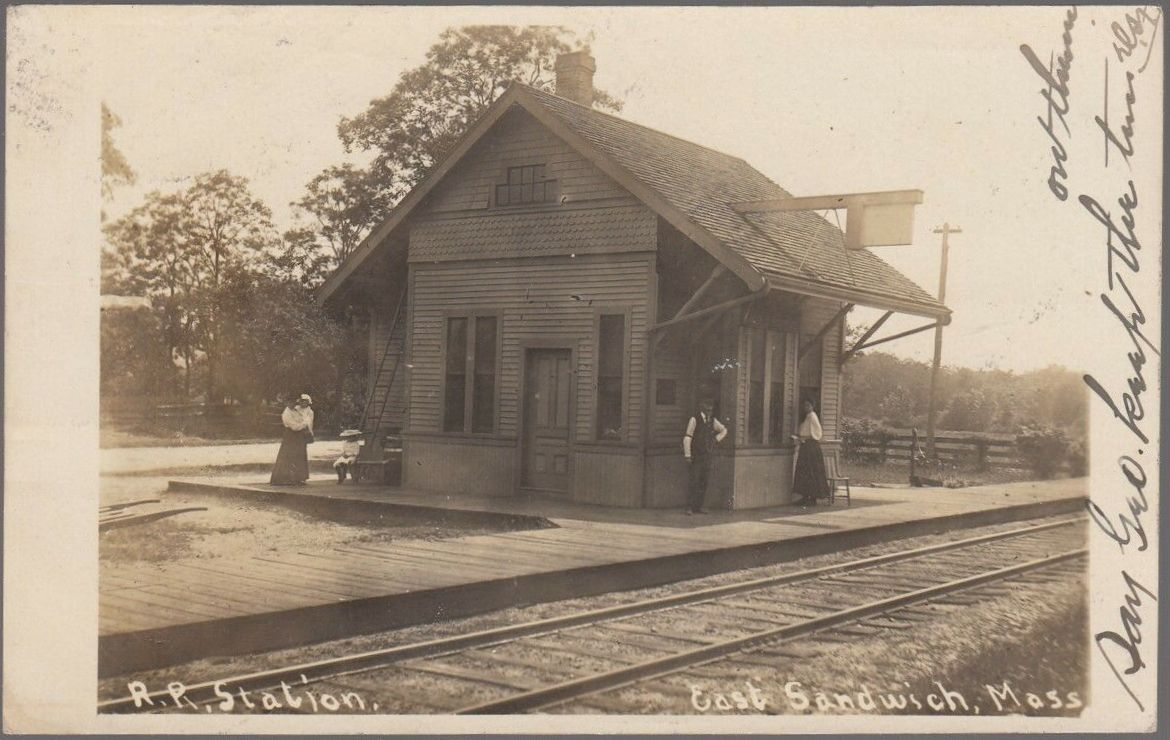
- East Sandwich station on a 1907 postcard

General information
- Location: East Sandwich, Massachusetts
- Coordinates: 41°44′25.03″N 70°26′53.32″W
- Line: Cape Main Line

History
- Rebuilt: 1893

Former services
Preceding station	New York, New Haven and Hartford Railroad	Following station
Sandwich toward Boston	Boston–Hyannis	West Barnstable toward Hyannis
Sandwich toward Boston	Boston–Provincetown	West Barnstable toward Provincetown
Location

East Sandwich station is a former train station located in East Sandwich, Massachusetts.

The station was built by the Cape Cod Branch Railroad when the line was extended beyond Sandwich. A new station building was constructed in 1893. The station building still exists as a private residence at 404 Old Kings Highway (Massachusetts 6A), although it is much changed from its original appearance. It was moved back from the tracks, rotated almost 90 degrees, and had several additions made.
