= Yarmouth station (Massachusetts) =

Railway station in Yarmouth, Massachusetts

Yarmouth
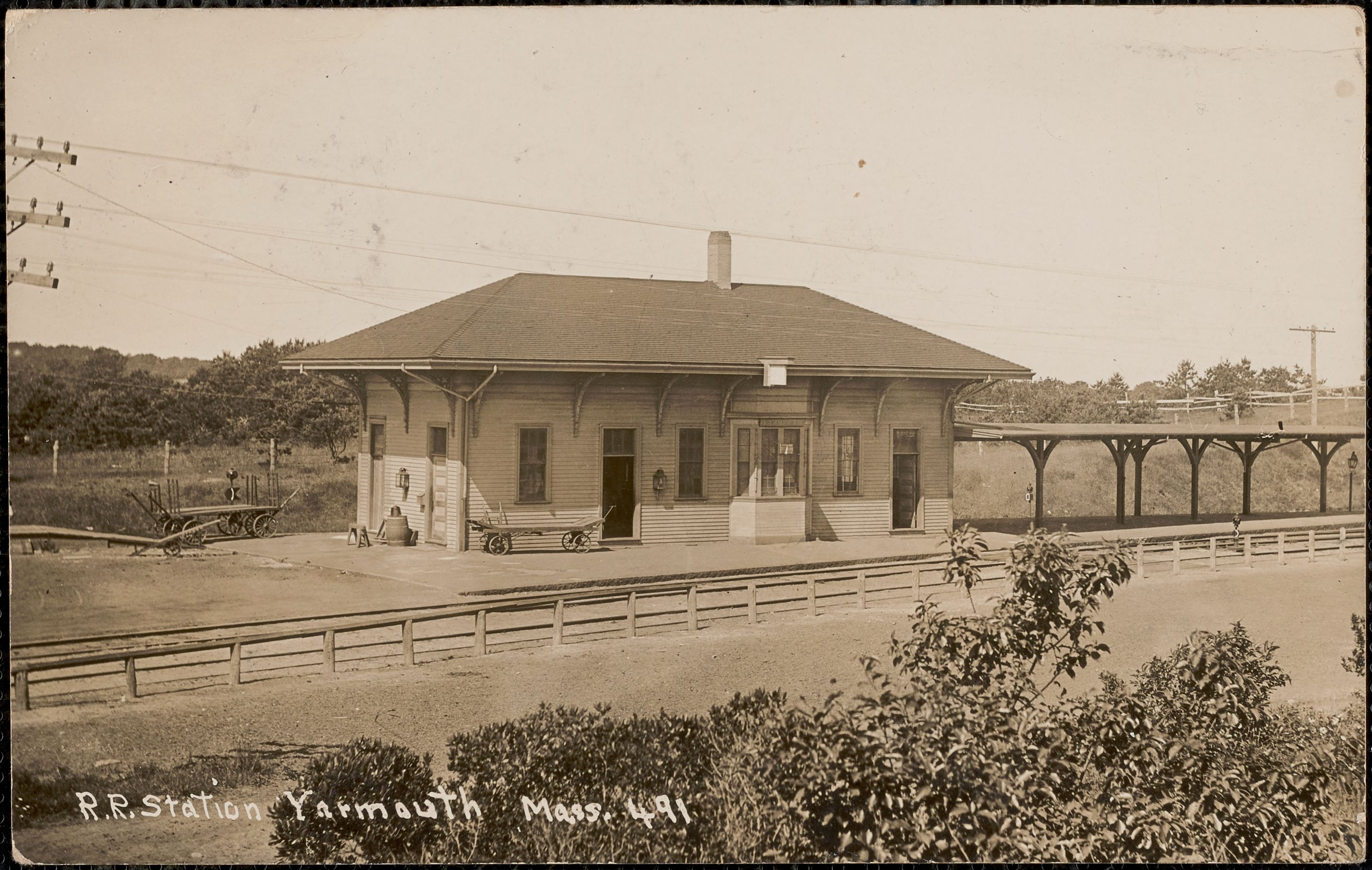
- The second Yarmouth station around 1908

General information
- Location: Railroad Avenue at Cross Street; Yarmouth Port, Massachusetts
- Coordinates: 41°41′55″N 70°15′30″W
- Lines: Cape Cod Main Line, Hyannis Secondary

History
- Opened: 1854
- Rebuilt: 1878, 1941

Former services
Preceding station	New York, New Haven and Hartford Railroad	Following station
Barnstable toward Boston	Boston–Provincetown	Bass River toward Provincetown
Barnstable toward Boston	Boston–Hyannis	Hyannis Terminus
West Barnstable toward New York	Cape Codder	Hyannis Terminus
Location

Yarmouth station was a railroad station in the Yarmouth Port section of Yarmouth, Massachusetts.

== History ==
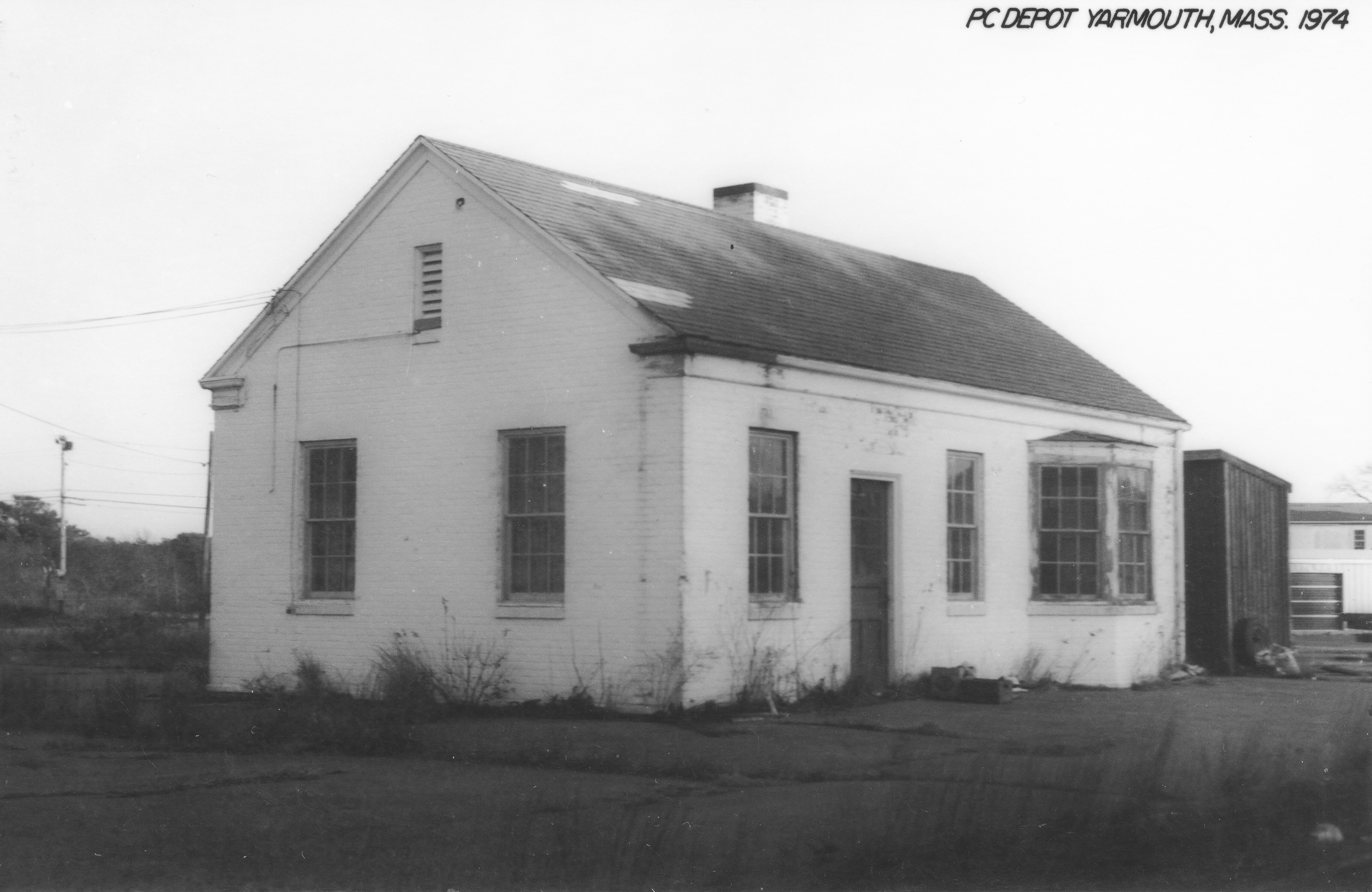
The 1941-built Yarmouth station in 1974

The original station was built in the village of Yarmouth Port when the Cape Cod Railroad extended its line from Sandwich to Hyannis in 1854. In December 1865, the Cape Cod Central Railroad opened a branch from Yarmouth to Orleans, which was later extended to Provincetown. It was destroyed by a fire on November 17, 1878; the Old Colony Railroad built a replacement.

A branch from Harwich to Chatham opened in 1887; Yarmouth–Chatham service ran until 1931. Service past Yarmouth to Provincetown ended with the 88 stations case on July 17, 1938, with a brief revival in mid-1940. Yarmouth station was again destroyed by fire in 1941; the New York, New Haven, and Hartford Railroad built a brick replacement. It served year-round Boston–Hyannis trains until June 30, 1959, and New York–Hyannis trains including the Day Cape Codder and Neptune until 1964. This station was torn down around 1975 to make room for the warehouse of Yarmouth-based Christmas Tree Shops.
