= Sandwich station (Massachusetts) =

Train station in Sandwich, Massachusetts, US

Sandwich, MA
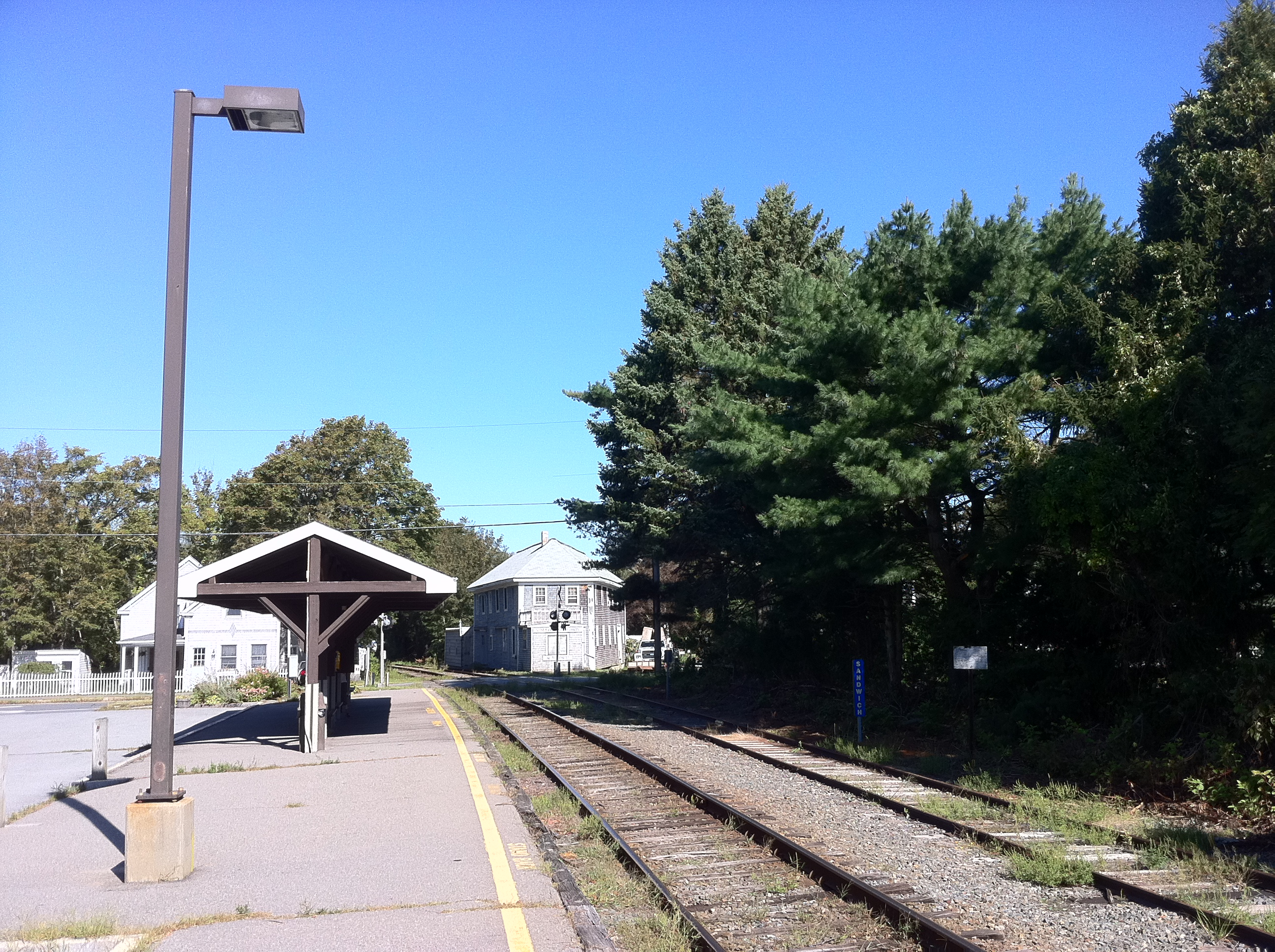
- Sandwich station in 2011

General information
- Location: Jarves Street; Sandwich, Massachusetts
- Coordinates: 41°45′36″N 70°29′32″W
- Owner: MassDOT
- Line: Cape Main Line
- Platforms: 1 side platform

Construction
- Parking: ~20 spaces
- Accessible: yes

History
- Opened: 1848
- Rebuilt: 1878

Services
Preceding station	Cape Cod Central Railroad	Following station
Buzzards Bay Terminus	Main Line	West Barnstable toward Hyannis
Former services
Preceding station	Amtrak	Following station
Buzzards Bay toward New York	Cape Codder 1986–1996	West Barnstable toward Hyannis
Preceding station	Cape Cod and Hyannis Railroad	Following station
Buzzards Bay toward Braintree or Attleboro	Braintree-Hyannis Closed 1988	West Barnstable toward Hyannis
Preceding station	New York, New Haven and Hartford Railroad	Following station
Sagamore toward Boston	Boston–Hyannis	East Sandwich toward Hyannis
Sagamore toward Boston	Boston–Provincetown	East Sandwich toward Provincetown
Buzzards Bay toward New York	Cape Codder	West Barnstable toward Hyannis
Location

Sandwich station is a railway station in Sandwich, Massachusetts on Cape Cod. It is currently only used by the Cape Cod Central Railroad as a whistle stop for its seasonal excursion trains.

== History ==
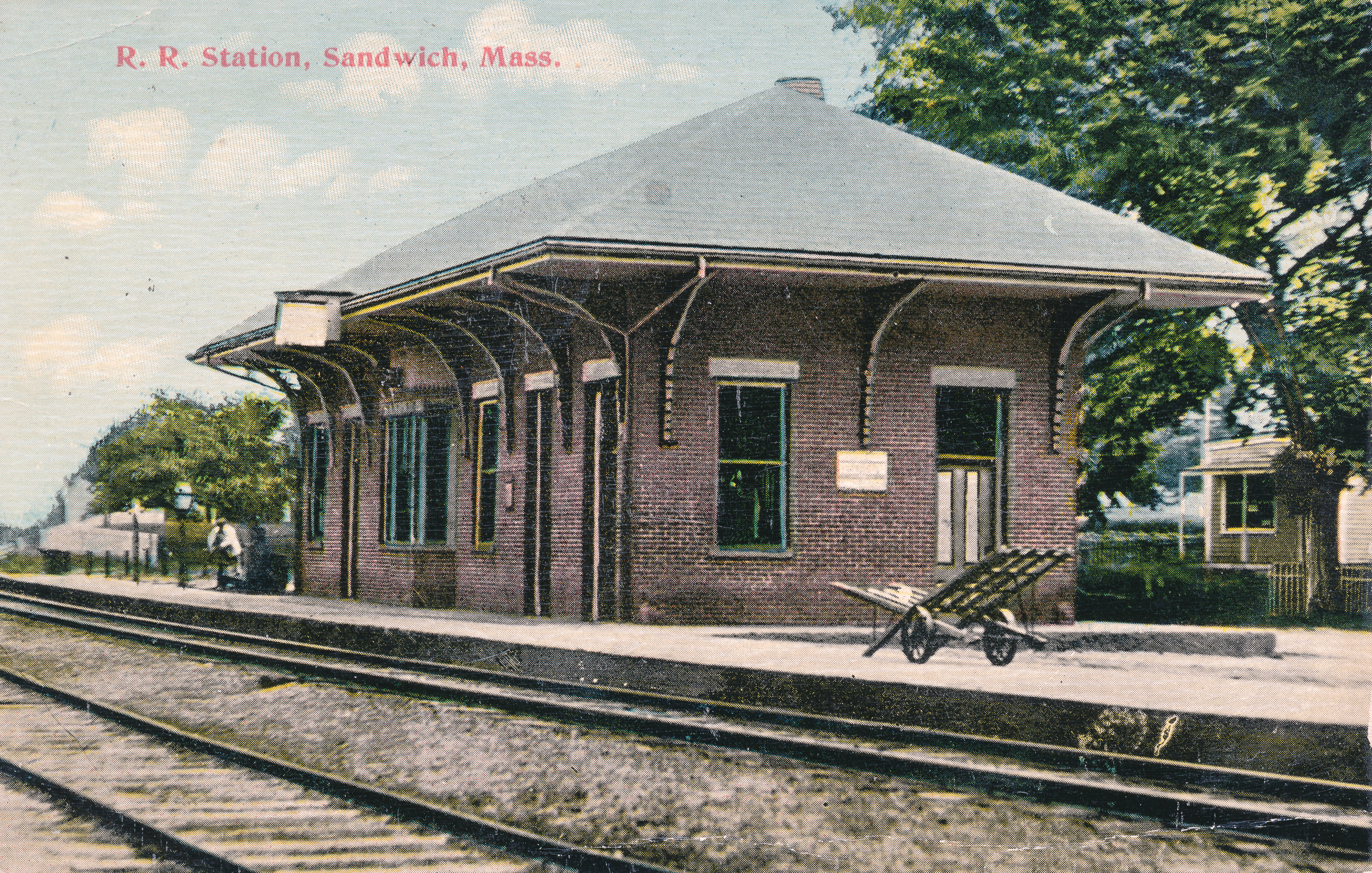
The second Sandwich station building around 1918

The original passenger station in Sandwich was opened in May 1848 when the Cape Cod Branch Railroad extended its rail line from Middleborough to Sandwich. The original station was replaced by a brick station building with a wooden freight house in 1878. It was demolished in the 1980s.

Scheduled year-round passenger service was operated to Sandwich from 1848 until June 30, 1959, when the New Haven Railroad discontinued all passenger service on its Old Colony division. During the summers of 1961 to 1964 the New Haven Railroad operated weekend service between New York and Hyannis, with a scheduled stop in Sandwich. New Haven trains of the 1930s-1960s included the Day Cape Codder, Neptune and Night Cape Codder, in addition to several trains a day year round to Boston.

The station also saw a restoration of seasonal service between 1984 and 1988 when the Cape Cod & Hyannis Railroad operated service between Braintree, Massachusetts and Cape Cod. The Sandwich station was also used from 1986 to 1996 for Amtrak's Cape Codder service. However, it has not been a stop for the seasonal Cape Flyer train service initiated in 2013.

Sandwich station currently serves as a whistle stop for select tourist excursion trains operated by Cape Cod Central Railroad, and also serves as the "turning point" for trains traveling to Mill Creek in Sandwich.
