= Bass River station =

Former railroad station in Massachusetts

Bass River
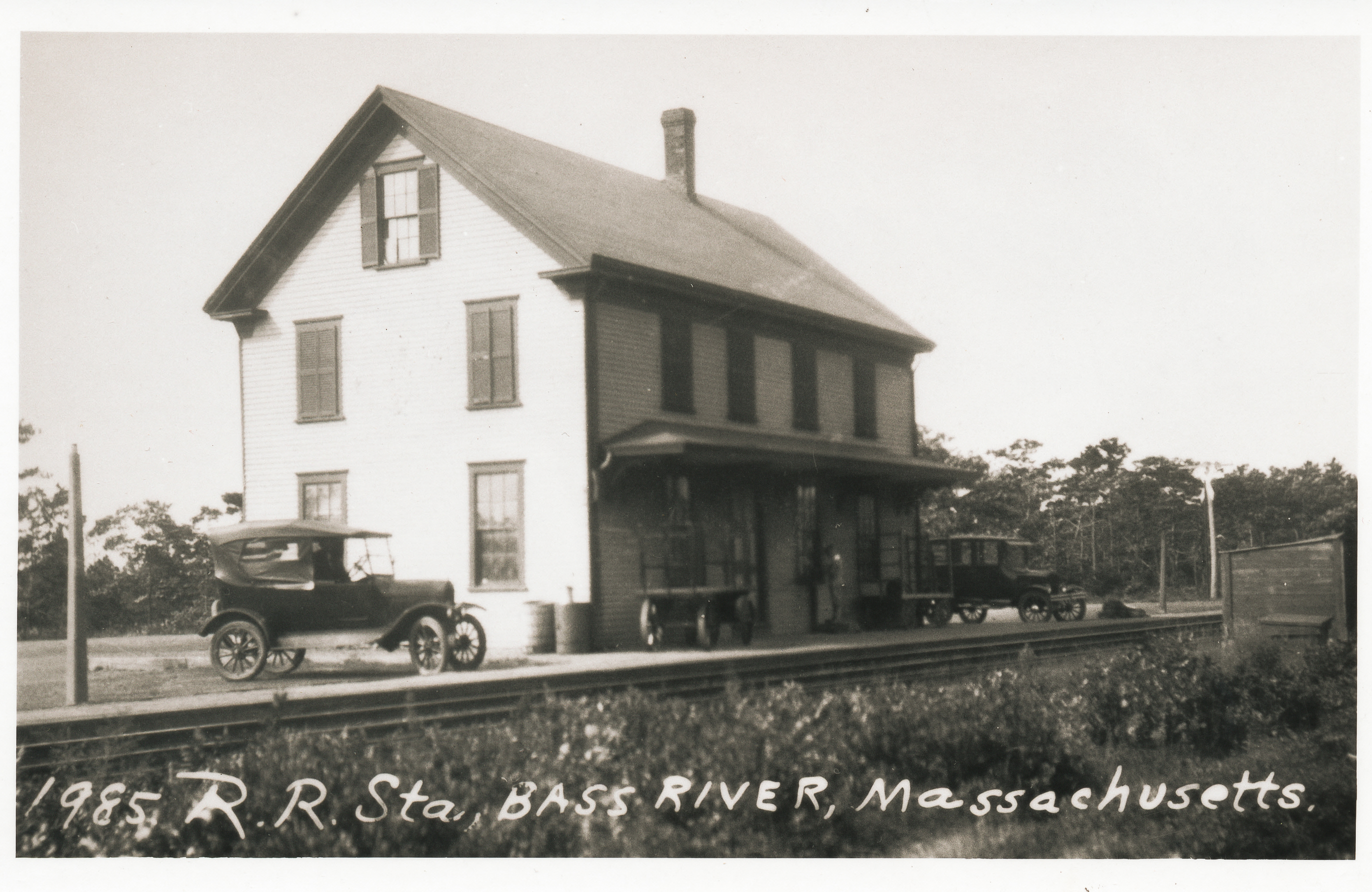
- Bass River station around 1927

General information
- Coordinates: 41°41′8.57″N 70°12′30.32″W
- Line: Cape Cod Railroad

History
- Opened: 1865
- Closed: 1936

Former services
Preceding station	New York, New Haven and Hartford Railroad	Following station
Yarmouth toward Boston	Boston–Provincetown	South Dennis toward Provincetown
Location

Bass River station was a railroad station located in Yarmouth, Massachusetts.

South Yarmouth station was constructed in 1865 at Great Western Road. A new station building was constructed in 1875. It was moved west to Station Road around the end of the century, and was later renamed Bass Rocks. The station was closed in 1936 and demolished the next year.
