= Bourne station =

Railroad station in Bourne, Massachusetts

Bourne
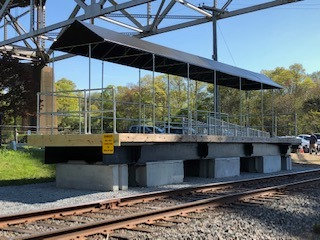
- Bourne station in June 2019

General information
- Location: 21 Bourne Bridge Road; Bourne, Massachusetts
- Coordinates: 41°44′47.90″N 70°35′20.03″W
- Owner: MassDOT
- Line: Cape Main Line
- Platforms: 1 side platform
- Tracks: 1
- Connections: CCRTA: Falmouth shuttle Steamship Authority Shuttle

Construction
- Parking: None
- Accessible: Yes

History
- Opened: May 24, 2019

Services
Preceding station	MBTA	Following station
Buzzards Bay toward South Station	CapeFLYER	Hyannis Terminus
Former services
Preceding station	New York, New Haven and Hartford Railroad	Following station
Buzzards Bay toward Boston	Boston–Hyannis	Sagamore toward Hyannis
Buzzards Bay toward Boston	Boston–Provincetown	Sagamore toward Provincetown
Location

Bourne station is a train station in Bourne, Massachusetts, served by the CapeFlyer.

== History ==
=== Former station ===
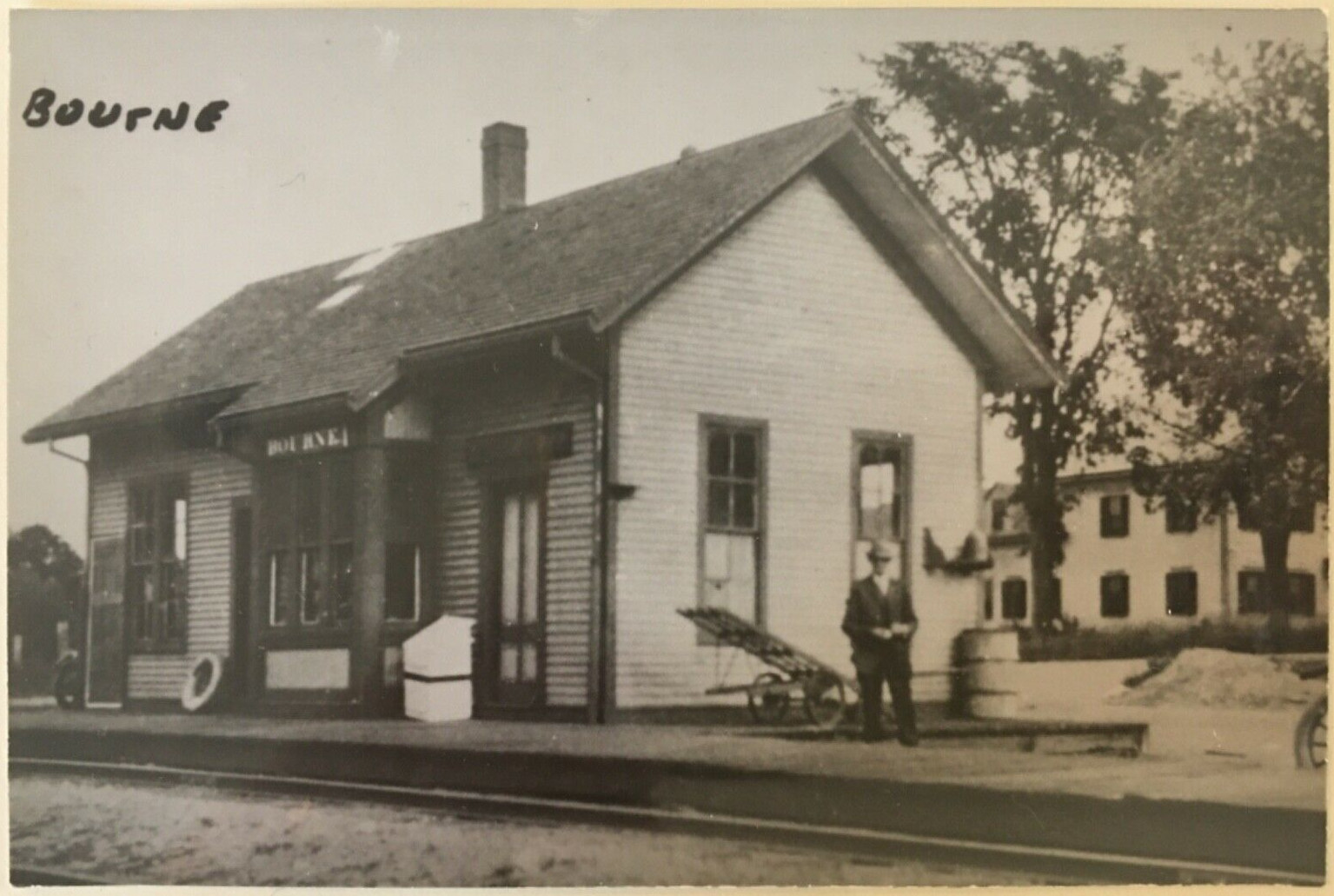
Postcard of Bourne station

Monument station was built by the Cape Cod Branch Railroad when the railroad line was extended from Wareham to Sandwich in 1848. It was located at what is now Old Bridge Road on the north side of the Monument River, approximately where the north canal service road / bike path is now located. The station was renamed Bourne by the Old Colony Railroad around 1884.

The 1909–1916 widening of the river into the Cape Cod Canal necessitated the relocation of the Cape Main Line between Buzzards Bay and Sagamore. The relocated line opened in late 1911, with Bourne station moved about 800 feet (240 m) south to Keene Street on the south side of the canal. Between 1938 and 1939, the New Haven Railroad had ended passenger service at the station and shifted its status to freight only.

=== CapeFLYER station ===
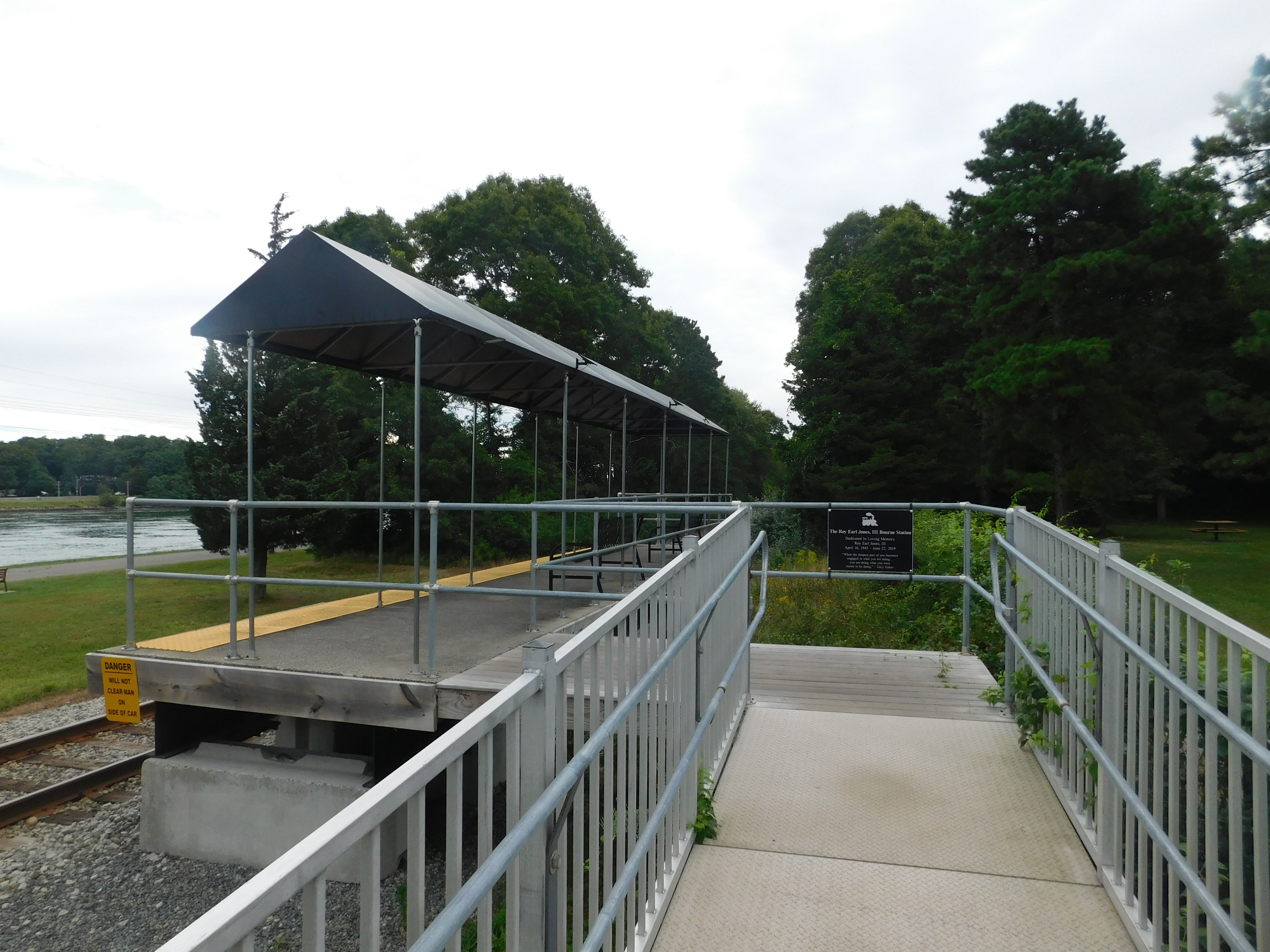
Bourne station in 2023

In September 2014 it was announced that local officials were considering a new station along the CapeFlyer route in Bourne for the 2015 season. According to the announcement, the station stop would be located on government land under the Bourne Bridge. In November 2014 the state announced construction of the station would occur, along with trackside improvements and signal houses on both sides of the bridge, as well as improvements to switches in the area. Additionally, a 4,000 foot siding would be constructed so trains could wait at the bridge.

In February 2015, it was announced that station construction would be delayed for one year, due to the amount of winter snow and local unease over the project. The station was also considered as a possible stop for future commuter rail. In September 2015, however, it was announced that plans to build the station were suspended, and although there was still a push by some within the community to build the station behind the Gallo Ice Arena, no official proposals or plans were made.

Discussions on the station were effectively nonexistent for the following three years, until it was announced that a smaller station would be built for service during the 2019 season. While initial plans for a fully constructed station were not realized, a prefabricated section of high-level platform was installed in May 2019 at the Bourne Bridge site, which the CapeFlyer began serving shortly after completion. Parking areas are not provided, as the station is primarily intended for train passengers to be picked up or dropped off.

=== Possible commuter rail service ===
In late 2020 and early 2021, MassDOT conducted a study evaluating the feasibility of extending commuter rail service from Middleborough/Lakeville station to Bourne. Upon conclusion of the study in spring 2021, two different alternatives for service were presented, one of which would terminate at Bourne station.

MassDOT plans to eventually relocate the station behind Gallo Ice Arena to make room for replacement of the Bourne Bridge.
