= Barnstable station =

Barnstable
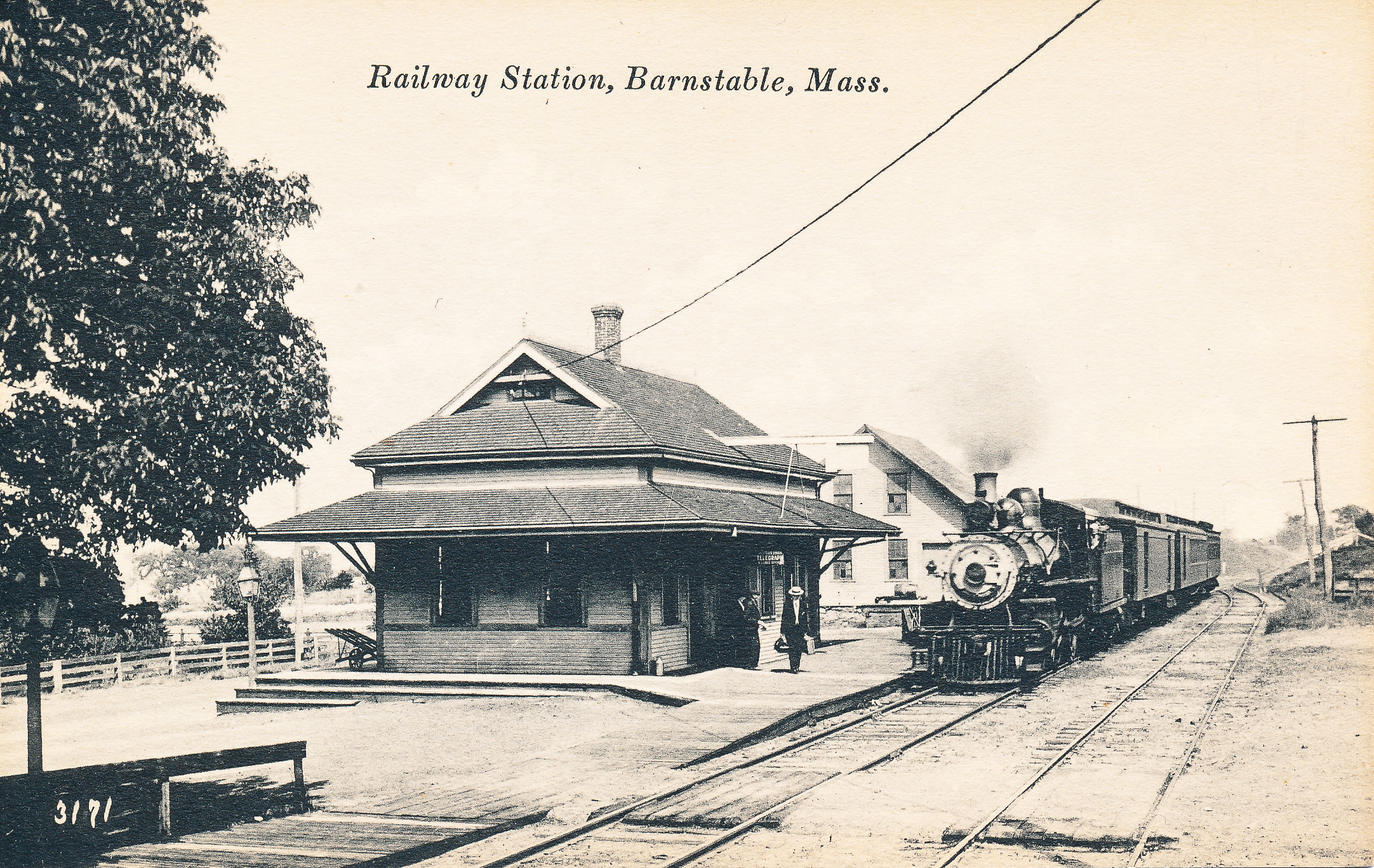
- Early-20th-century postcard of the station

General information
- Location: Railroad Avenue; Barnstable, Massachusetts
- Coordinates: 41°41′58.32″N 70°18′23.14″W
- Line: Cape Main Line

History
- Rebuilt: 1889

Former services
Preceding station	New York, New Haven and Hartford Railroad	Following station
West Barnstable toward Boston	Boston–Hyannis	Yarmouth toward Hyannis
West Barnstable toward Boston	Boston–Provincetown	Yarmouth toward Provincetown
Location

Barnstable station was a railway station located on Railroad Avenue in Barnstable, Massachusetts. It was constructed in 1889 by the Old Colony Railroad. From the latter years of the 19th century to the 1950s, the station served daily New Haven Railroad trains from Boston, and due for points further east on the Cape. For several decades in the mid-20th century, the station also served the New Haven's day and night versions of its seasonal New York - Hyannis Cape Codder trains. The station was torn down after the New Haven ended passenger rail service to the Cape in 1959.
