= Cape Codder (NH train) =

Defunct passenger train in the United States

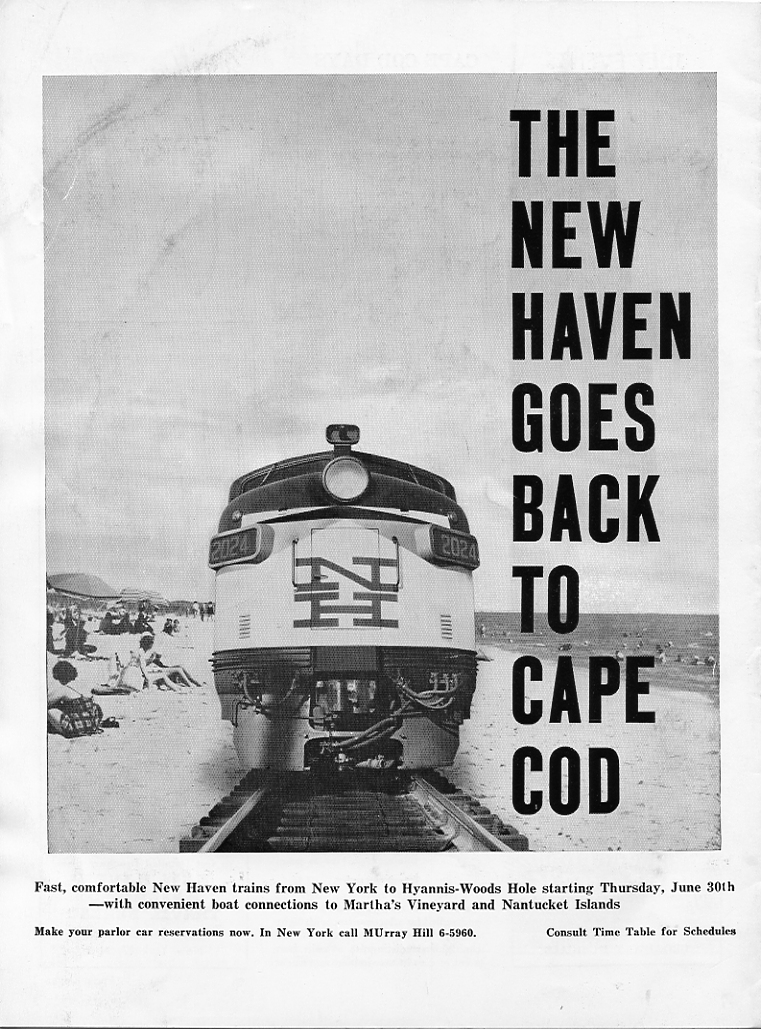
- 1960 advertisement for the Day Cape Codder and Neptune

Overview
- Service type: Inter-city rail
- Status: Discontinued
- Locale: Northeastern United States
- First service: July 3, 1925
- Last service: September 13, 1964
- Successor: Cape Codder (Amtrak)
- Former operator(s): New York, New Haven and Hartford Railroad

Route
- Termini: New York, New York; Hyannis, Massachusetts, Woods Hole, Massachusetts
- Distance travelled: 261.5 miles (420.8 km) (New York–Hyannis); 255 miles (410 km) (New York–Woods Hole)

On-board services
- Seating arrangements: Coaches (Day Cape Codder, Night Cape Codder)
- Sleeping arrangements: Roomettes, open sections, double bedrooms, drawing rooms and compartments (Night Cape Codder)
- Catering facilities: Dining car (Day Cape Codder)
- Observation facilities: Parlor car (Day Cape Codder)

The Cape Codder was a pair of day and night passenger trains run by the New York, New Haven and Hartford Railroad (NH) from the latter 1920s to the mid 1960s, with some brief interruptions. Its distinction was the longest tenure of direct summertime New York City to Cape Cod trains. With the improvement of highways in southeastern Massachusetts, passenger rail traffic diminished, and the Cape Codder service ended with the New Haven Railroad's discontinuing of passenger rail service to Cape Cod.

== History ==
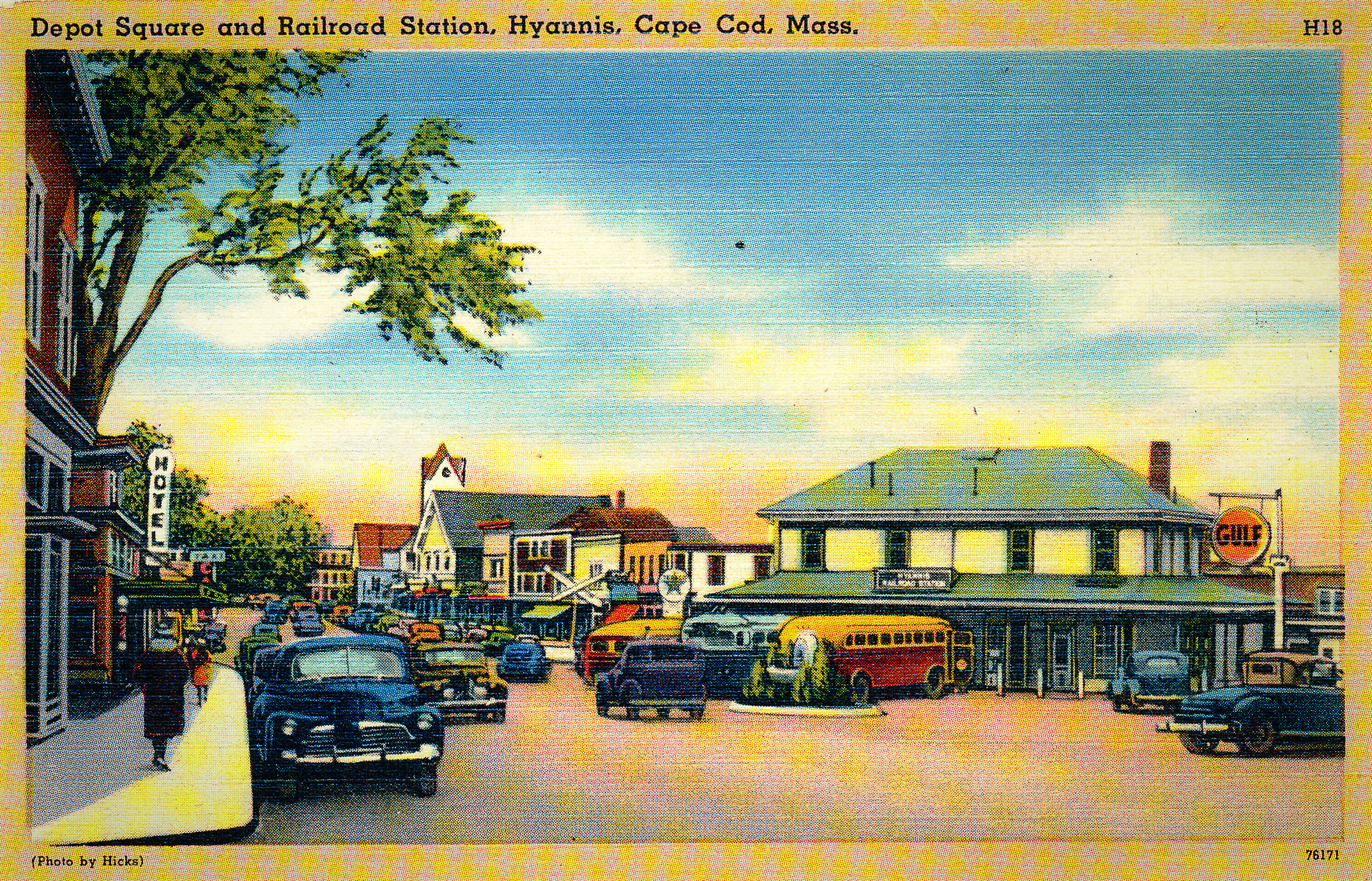
View at the main Cape Codder eastern terminus, Hyannis station, ca. 1945–1950.

The Cape Codder began operating on July 3, 1925 – the first through train between New York City and Cape Cod – providing overnight sleeper service during the summer season. The eastbound train ran to Hyannis on Friday nights, with the westbound return to Grand Central Terminal in New York on Sunday nights. A section serving Woods Hole, with a New England Steamship Company connection for Martha's Vineyard, was added for the 1926 season. The two sections ran combined between New York and Buzzards Bay.

By 1930, the Woods Hole section operated as a separate train, while the Hyannis section had through sleeping car service to/from Washington, D.C., which connected with the train at New Haven, Connecticut. Both trains operated only with Pullman sleepers and no coaches. The westbound Hyannis section combined at Yarmouth with a train from Provincetown carrying a sleeper for New York, but the eastbound train only had a bus connection to Provincetown. The Woods Hole section ran combined with the Harpooner, a 1929-introduced New York–Newport/New Bedford train with a Martha's Vineyard/Nantucket steamship connection at New Bedford Wharf.

The Provincetown train was dropped for the 1931 season, but both Provincetown and Chatham bus connections were available. Both branches of the Cape Codder plus the Harpooner operated as a single train, with New Bedford the primary connecting point for steamships. The Harpooner was discontinued by 1933, with Woods Hole again the steamship transfer point.

In 1937, the NH inaugurated the Day Cape Codder which would travel daily from New York City to the Woods Hole and the Hyannis branches. The New Haven's Night Cape Codder provided the night train service to the same branches on Cape Cod (daily except Sunday eastbound, and daily except Friday and Saturday westbound). Similar to the earlier incarnation, the Night Cape Codder also ran in an express fashion, bypassing Stamford and only stopping at New Haven before stopping again in Wareham. The NH at this time ran additional daytime trains operating only on Fridays, Cape Cod bound, and Sundays, westbound, the Islander and Neptune. The Islander only served the Woods Hole branch. All of the daytime trains offered dining car and grill car service.

Several lightly-used stations including Middleborough, Onset, Gray Gables, West Falmouth, Sagamore, and Barnstable were dropped in the 1930s and 1940s, while Attleboro was added.

During World War II the New Haven suspended the Night Cape Codder, and from 1943 to 1945 it also suspended the Islander and Neptune trains. The Day Cape Codder was suspended during 1945 when railroad equipment was needed for transporting returning soldiers. The Day Cape Codder and Neptune returned in 1946, while the Night Cape Codder and its sleeper cars returned for the summer 1948 season.

The Neptune and the Night Cape Codder only operated on Fridays eastbound and Sundays westbound. The Night Cape Codder for most of its years had the open sections and private bedrooms. By summer, 1955 the train included modern roomettes as well.

The New Haven ended all Old Colony Division passenger service on July 1, 1959, when the state of Massachusetts did not resume a temporary subsidy. New York–Cape Cod service did not operate that summer. However, for the 1960 to 1964 summer seasons, the Day Cape Codder and the Neptune would return. Amtrak operated the New York–Cape Cod Cape Codder, similar to the New Haven's service, from 1986 to 1996.
