= Cape Cod Central Railroad =

Heritage railroad in Massachusetts, US

Coordinates: 41°42′25″N 70°22′27″W

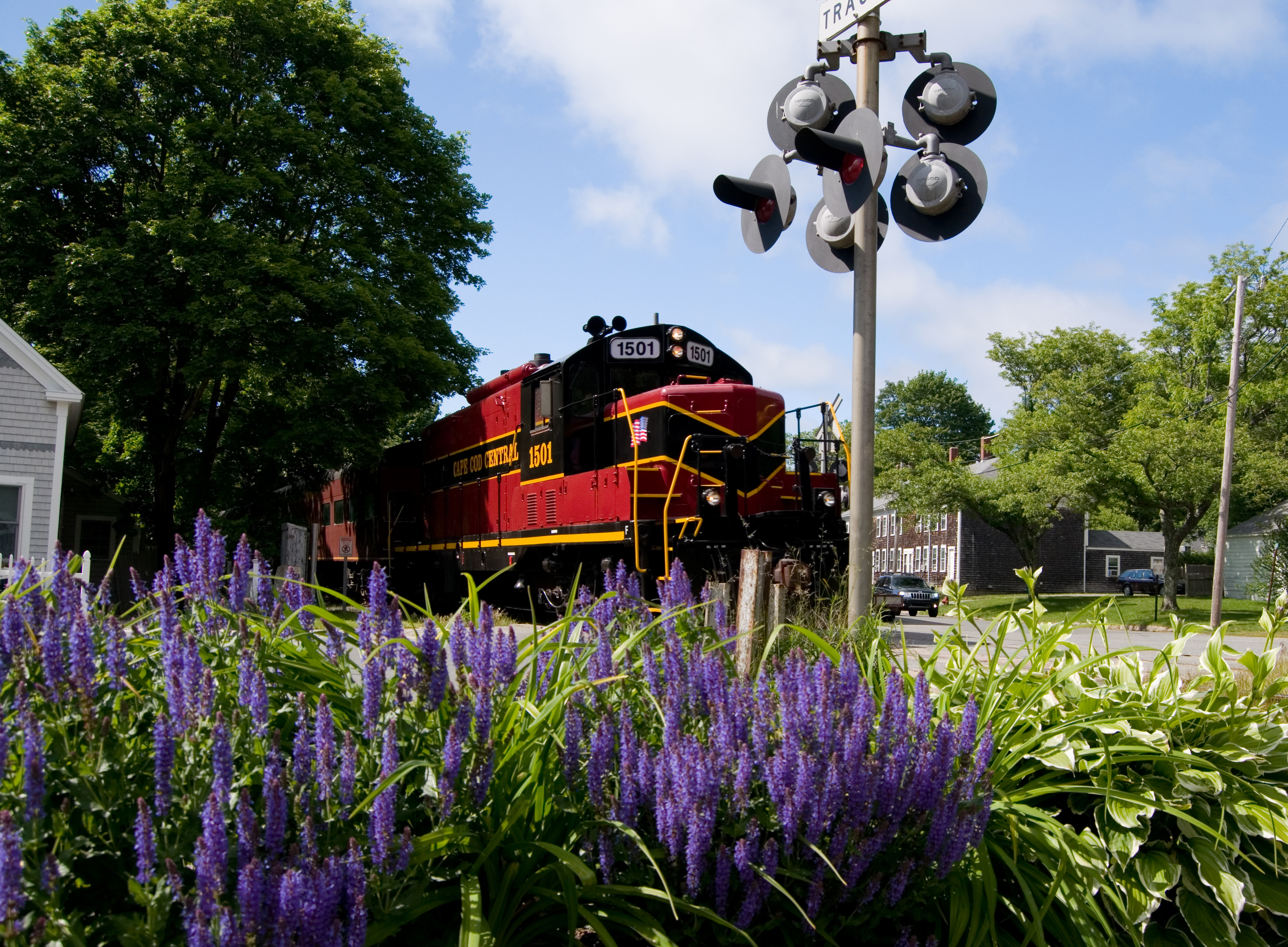
- A CCCR Train in Sandwich, Massachusetts

Overview
- Headquarters: Hyannis, Massachusetts
- Locale: Cape Cod
- Dates of operation: 1999–present

Technical
- Track gauge: 4 ft 8 1/2 in (1,435 mm) standard gauge

Other
- Website: www.capetrain.com

The Cape Cod Central Railroad is a heritage railroad located on Cape Cod, Massachusetts. It operates on a rail line known as the Cape Main Line, which is owned by the Massachusetts Department of Transportation. The line was previously owned and operated by the Cape Cod Railroad, the Old Colony Railroad, and later the New Haven Railroad, each of which operated passenger trains on the line from 1854 to 1959. Although its namesake is the former Cape Cod Central Railroad (1861–1868), the two companies are unrelated. The Cape Cod Central Railroad is a wholly owned subsidiary of Cape Rail Inc., which also owns and operates the Massachusetts Coastal Railroad.

== History ==
The Cape Cod Central Railroad was founded in 1999. This saw the continuation in passenger/tourist service from the Cape Cod Railroad, which was owned by the freight operator of the line, Bay Colony, that ended service in 1998, following a lawsuit alleging various environmental issues. In 2007, the Massachusetts Coastal Railroad took over freight operations on the line from the Bay Colony. In 2012, Cape Rail, Inc. was sold to the Iowa Pacific. The railroad acquired 2 ex-New Haven EMD FL9 locomotives from CTDOT in 2018. Following Iowa Pacific's Bankruptcy in the early 2020s, Cape Rail, Inc. once again became an independent company.

== Services ==
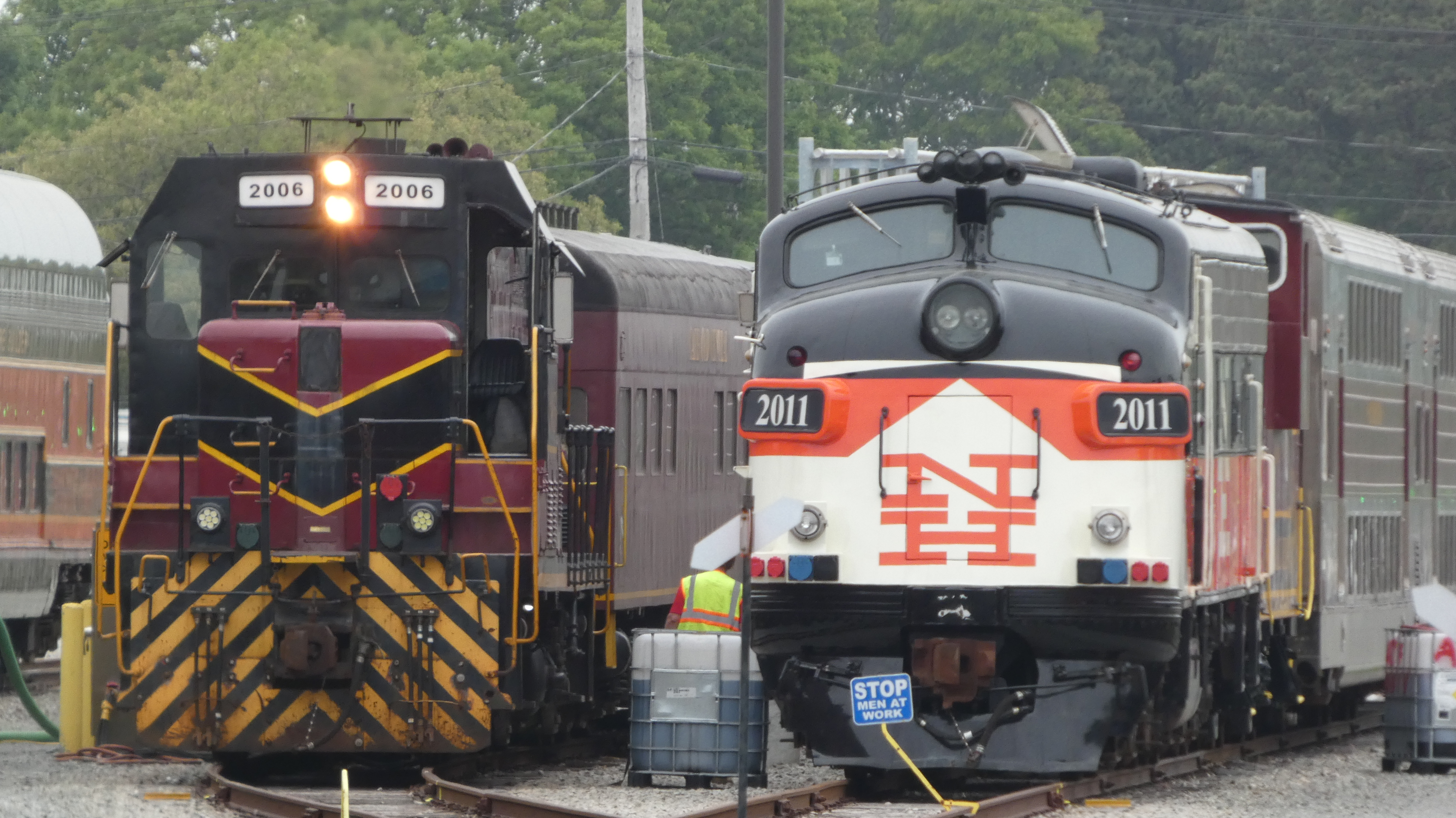
Two of the Cape Cod Central's trains in Hyannis Yard, including an FL9 and one of Mass Coastal's Locomotives.

The Cape Cod Central Railroad operates a variety of excursion and dining trains along the Cape Main Line from May thru October, as well as limited special trains during the off-season. Most trains depart from Hyannis, with some from Buzzards Bay and West Barnstable, as well as a small platform on the site of the former North Falmouth Station. While it does not receive regular service, the railroad also allows charter trains to be booked from Sandwich, as well as all of the other stations. The railroad also operates a special train based on the film The Polar Express during the Christmas season.

== See also ==
- Cape Cod Canal Railroad Bridge
- List of heritage railroads in the United States
- Cape Codder (train)
- CapeFlyer
