= Cape Cod Central Railroad (1861–1868) =

Railroad in Massachusetts, US

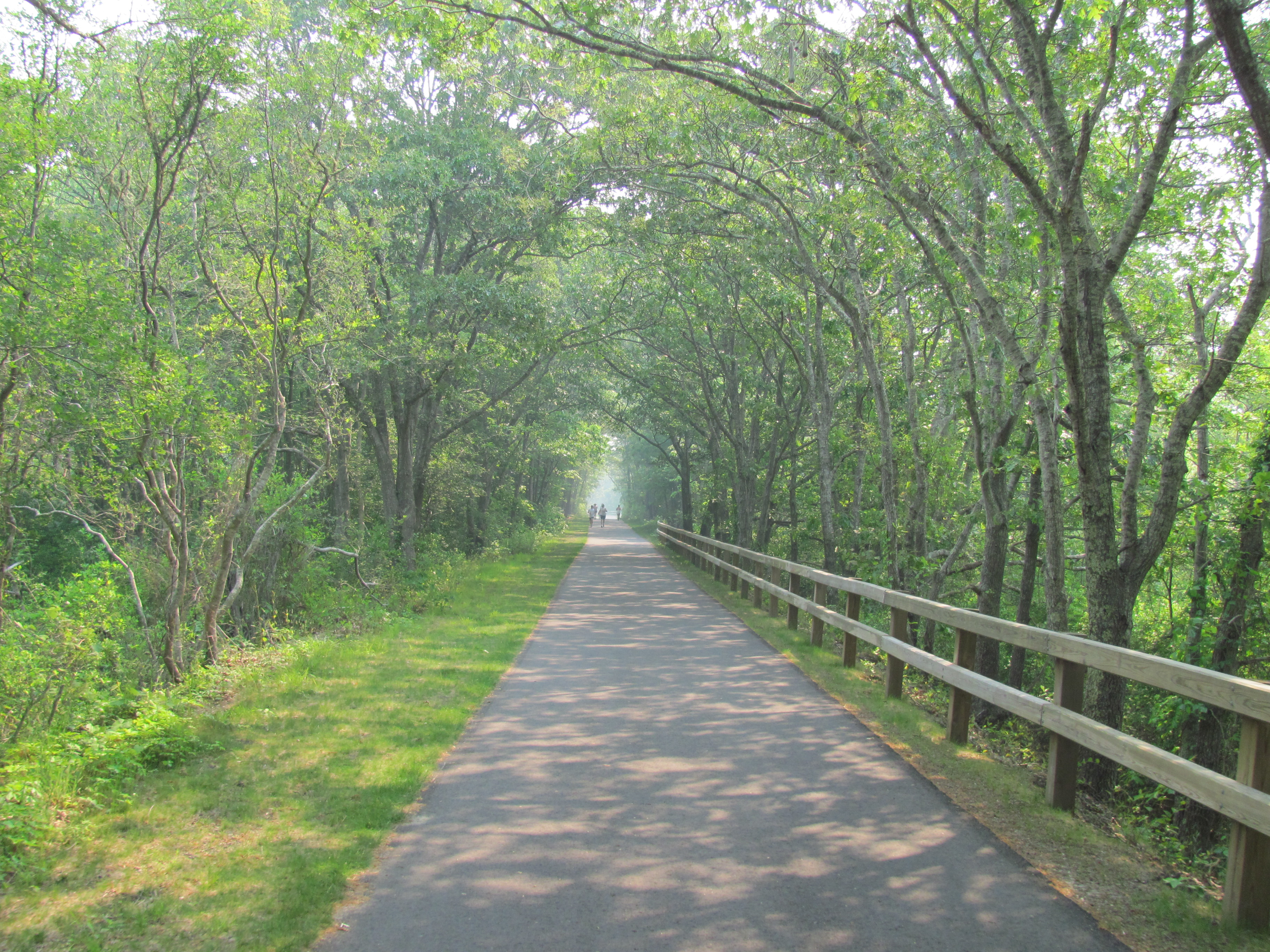
The Cape Cod Rail Trail in East Brewster, built along part of the original Cape Cod Central Railroad line

The Cape Cod Central Railroad was a railroad in southeastern Massachusetts, more specifically in central Cape Cod. It was incorporated in 1861 to extend the Cape Cod Railroad from Yarmouth to Orleans through the towns of Dennis, Harwich and Brewster. The 18.7 mile line opened for service in December, 1865.

The Cape Cod Central Railroad merged with the Cape Cod Railroad in 1868. Its line later became part of the Old Colony Railroad in 1872. In 1873, Old Colony finished extending the line to Provincetown.

In 1887, the Chatham Railroad Company would complete its line from the original Cape Cod Central line at Harwich to Chatham, Massachusetts.

Unlike the rest of the rail lines on Cape Cod which became part of the New York, New Haven and Hartford Railroad in 1893 upon its lease of the entire Old Colony Railroad network, the Chatham line remained independent until 1905 when the New York, New Haven and Hartford contracted to operate the line.

Regular passenger service to Provincetown ended in 1938 and in 1959 all passenger service operated by the company on Cape Cod ceased.

Today, much of the original 1865 right-of-way of the Cape Cod Central Railroad is part of the popular Cape Cod Rail Trail, which runs from South Dennis to Wellfleet.

Also, the Cape Cod Central Railroad name continues as a tourist railroad during the summer and fall months with service from Hyannis, although not on the lines of the original Cape Cod Central Railroad.
