= Buzzards Bay station =

Train station in Barnstable, Massachusetts, US

Buzzards Bay
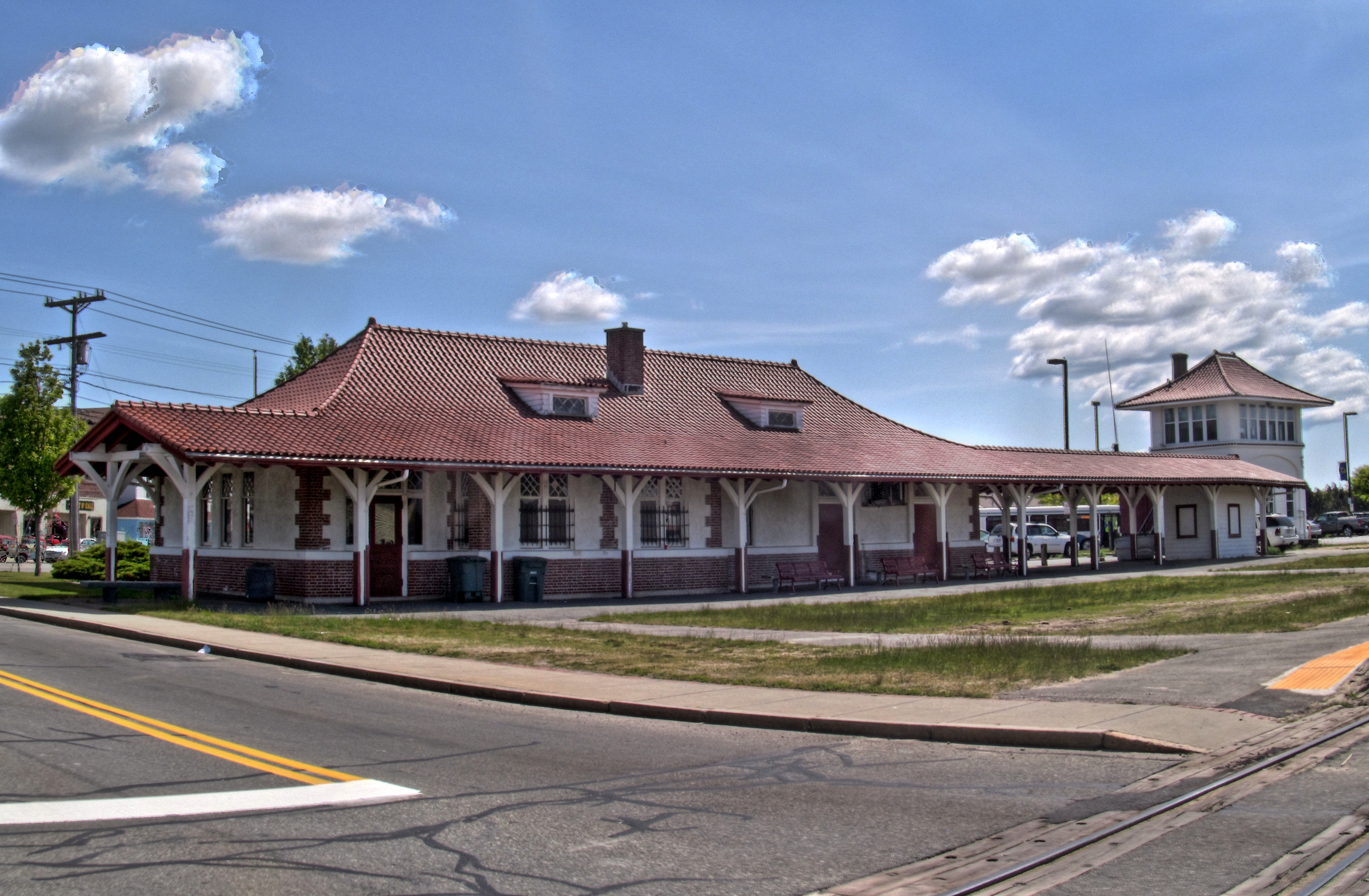
- Buzzards Bay station in May 2013

General information
- Location: Main Street at Academy Drive; Buzzards Bay, Massachusetts
- Coordinates: 41°44′42″N 70°36′57″W
- Owner: MassDOT
- Line: Cape Main Line
- Platforms: 1 side platform
- Connections: GATRA: Link 2 CCRTA: Bourne Run, Sandwich Line; Peter Pan

Construction
- Parking: Yes
- Accessible: Yes

History
- Opened: 1848
- Rebuilt: 1912

Services
Preceding station	MBTA	Following station
Wareham Village toward South Station	CapeFLYER	Bourne toward Hyannis
Preceding station	Cape Cod Central Railroad	Following station
Terminus	Main Line	Sandwich toward Hyannis
Former services
Preceding station	Amtrak	Following station
Wareham toward New York	Cape Codder 1986–1996	Sandwich toward Hyannis
Preceding station	Cape Cod and Hyannis Railroad	Following station
Wareham toward Braintree or Attleboro	Braintree-Hyannis Closed 1988	Sandwich toward Hyannis
Wareham toward Braintree or Attleboro	Falmouth Branch Closed 1988	Cataumet toward Falmouth
Preceding station	New York, New Haven and Hartford Railroad	Following station
Onset toward Boston	Boston–Woods Hole	Gray Gables toward Woods Hole
Onset toward Boston	Boston–Hyannis	Bourne toward Hyannis
Onset toward Boston	Boston–Provincetown	Bourne toward Provincetown
Wareham toward New York	Cape Codder	Sandwich toward Hyannis
Wareham toward New York	Cape Codder	Monument Beach toward Woods Hole
Location

Buzzards Bay station is a train station located on Main Street in Buzzards Bay, Massachusetts. The site also contains an interlocking tower. The Cape Cod Canal Railroad Bridge is adjacent.

Buzzards Bay is an intermediate stop on the Cape Cod Regional Transit Authority's CapeFLYER summer weekend passenger service. It is also the westernmost stop of Cape Cod Central Railroad tourist service. Extension of MBTA Commuter Rail service on the Middleborough/Lakeville Line to the station has been proposed on several occasions, but never enacted.

== History ==
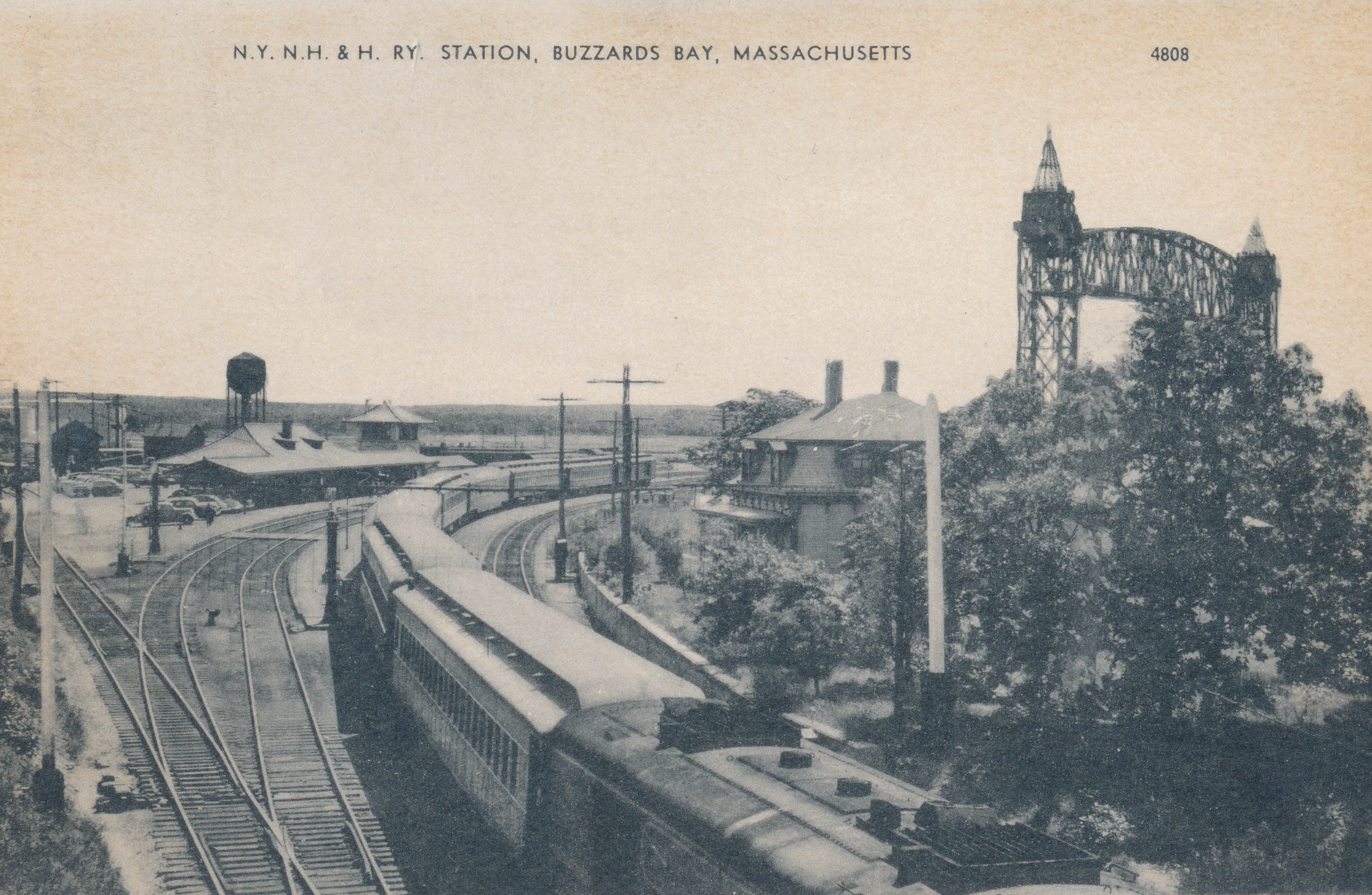
The station on a postcard from the 1940s

Originally known as Cohasset Narrows, the station was built as part of the Cape Cod Branch Railroad in 1848. Its name was changed to Buzzards Bay on August 1, 1879 by the Old Colony Railroad who had acquired the line in 1872 with a merger of the Cape Cod Railroad. The Woods Hole Branch opened on July 17, 1872. The Old Colony Railroad was an early proponent of decorating the grounds of its train stations. By 1891, Buzzards Bay had a large flower arrangement surrounding a 12-foot (3.7 m)-diameter fountain containing goldfish, turtles, and frogs.

The present station building was constructed by the New York, New Haven and Hartford Railroad in 1912. Prior to the opening of the Cape Cod Canal in 1916, Buzzards Bay was located on what was then the north bank of the Monument River at a junction of the main railroad line between Middleborough and Cape Cod and the branch to Woods Hole. The Woods Hole Branch crossed the river slightly west of what is now the Cape Cod Canal Railroad Bridge, while the Cape Cod main line continued along the north side of the river before crossing where the river narrowed at Bourne. The Monument River was converted into the Cape Cod Canal, which opened in 1916. The Cape Cod Main Line and junction were moved to the south side of the canal, which was later widened in the 1930s. Into the 1960s the New Haven Railroad operated daily passenger service to Boston and seasonal day and night Cape Codder service to New York City.

Originally located near the tracks, the station building is now set back from the train line because of the removal of excess trackage. The station also houses year-round offices and a seasonal visitor center for the Cape Cod Canal Region Chamber of Commerce.

It was a stop for Amtrak's Cape Codder which ran from 1986 to 1996 (again, New York to the Cape), and for the Cape Cod and Hyannis Railroad which ran from 1984 to 1988. In 1988, the state refurbished the station building and added an accessible platform in preparation for never-realized commuter rail service meant to extend to Falmouth.

=== Cape Cod Central Railroad ===
Buzzards Bay serves as the western terminus for Cape Cod Central Railroad, which runs tourist excursion trains along the track between Buzzards Bay and Hyannis. In the summer, Buzzards Bay serves as a station of departure for excursion trains running to West Barnstable, select dinner trains running along the length of the Canal, and a special excursion in mid-September to celebrate Cape Cod Canal Day, which includes a stop at the Pairpoint Glass facility in Sagamore. In the winter, Buzzards Bay is the point of departure for several Polar Express-esque holiday excursions.

=== CapeFLYER and proposed commuter service ===
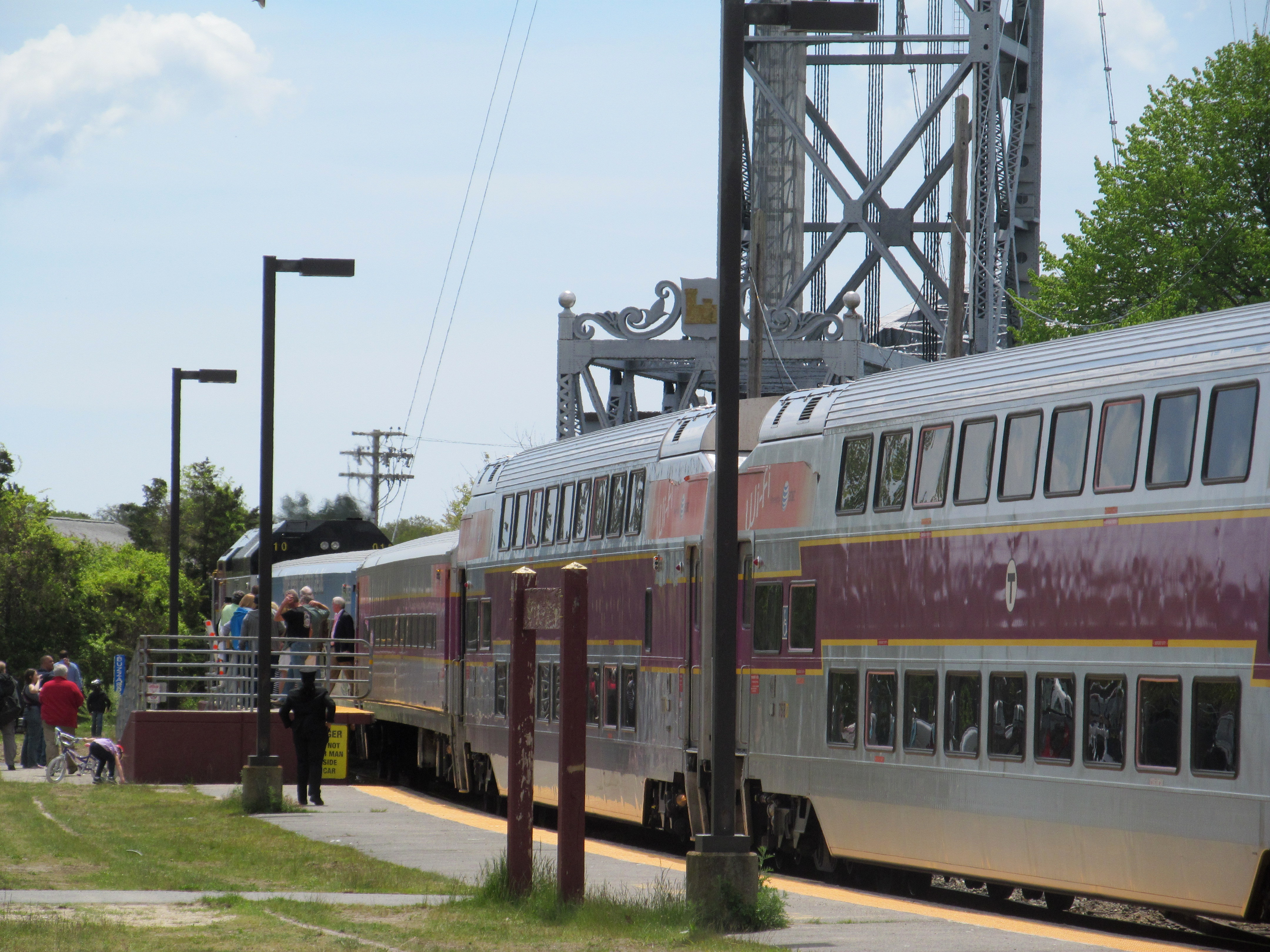
A CapeFLYER train at the 1999-built high level platform in 2013

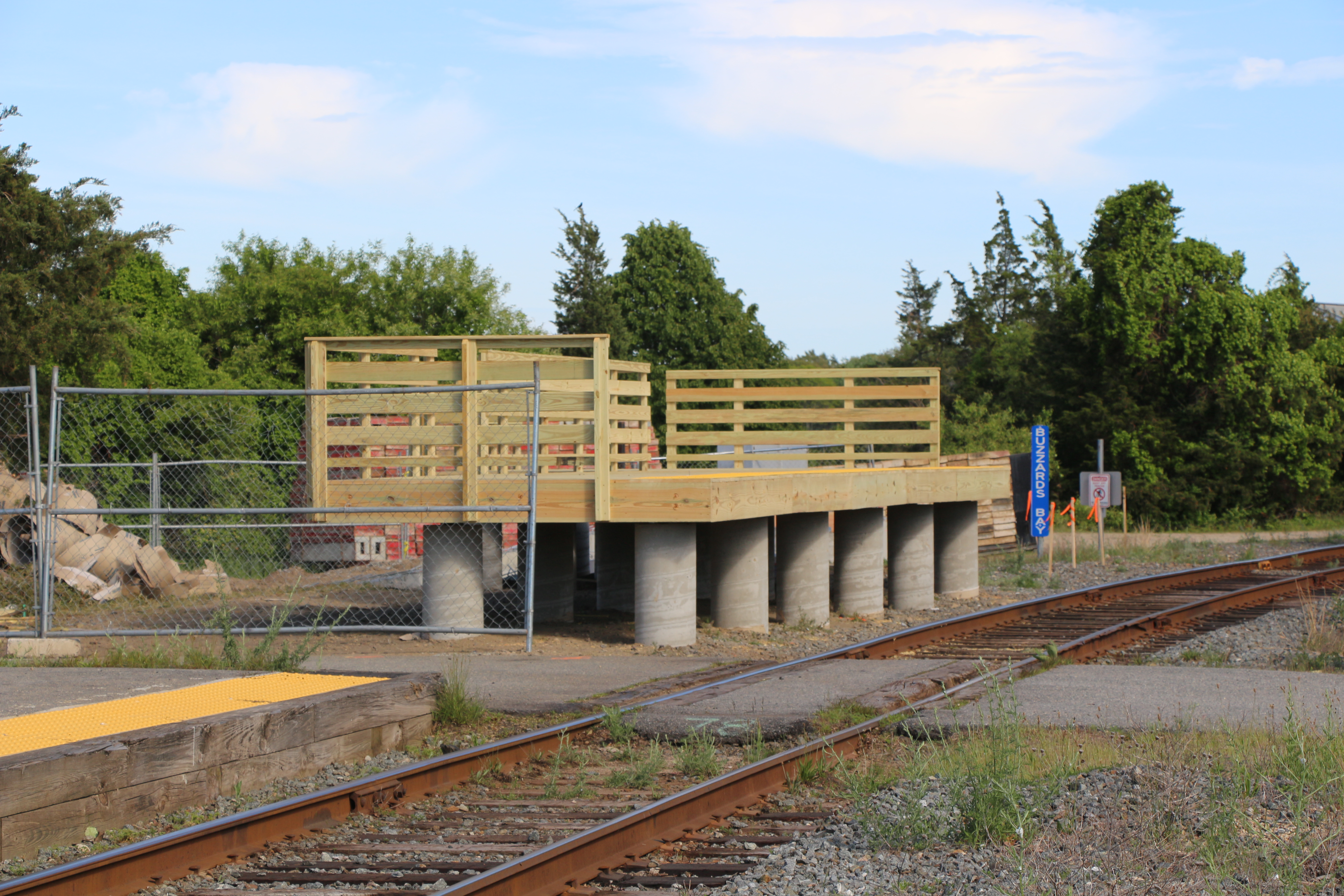
Second high-level platform under construction in June 2014

The Middleborough/Lakeville Line was opened to Middleborough/Lakeville in 1997. In 2007, the Boston Region Metropolitan Planning Organization released a report evaluating the possibility of commuter rail service to Buzzards Bay including several intermediate stops. However, other projects like the Greenbush Line received priority and the extension to Buzzards Bay was not constructed.

In 2014, a new high-level platform was built closer to the bridge. This platform allows CapeFLYER trains (which, like other MBTA trains, place the first car at the mini-high platforms) to avoid blocking the Academy Drive crossing while stopped at the station. In November 2014, it was announced that an improved siding would be fully restored near the station, including a universal crossover before Cohasset Narrows.

The relative success of the CapeFLYER has brought new attention to the possibility of extending the Middleborough/Lakeville Line. The possibility was seriously discussed before the end of its first summer season. In September 2013, the Wareham Chamber of Commerce announced that based on the success of the CapeFLYER, the Chamber supported commuter rail extension to Buzzards Bay. The Buzzards Bay town selectmen similarly supported the idea later that year, and a public forum was held in January 2014.

Bourne’s Transportation Advisory Committee began studying the possibility in mid-2014, with the addition of work by MassDOT's Central Transportation Planning Staff (CTPS) in November 2014. A Local Impact Report released in April 2015 proposed an 800 foot (240 m) high-level platform and two parking alternatives: a 120-space modification of the existing lot, and a 400-to-600-space structure including a realignment of Academy Drive. The CTPS data estimated ridership at 875 daily riders if all Middleborough trains were extended to Buzzards Bay, or slightly fewer with a limited number of trains.

Bourne voted to join the MBTA district in 2015 and began paying an assessment in mid 2016 (for FY 2017), although there was no guarantee that commuter rail service would be provided in the fiscally constrained environment. For FY 2017, Bourne paid $41,707 to the MBTA plus an existing $88,429 to the CCRTA for existing bus service. MassDOT began planning a possible commuter rail trial service in October 2015. In February 2016, state representatives and CCRTA administrator Thomas Cahir said that the state wished to begin trial service during FY 2017, possibly by the end of 2016. However, the proposal was rejected by the MBTA Fiscal Management and Control Board in April 2016. In 2019, town officials raised the possibility of leaving the MBTA because the agency had no plans to extend service to Bourne within the next two decades. Withdrawal was rejected by residents at a June 2020 town meeting.

In fall 2020, the MBTA began conducting a study to evaluate the feasibility of implementing Buzzards Bay commuter rail service in conjunction with the then-under-construction South Coast Rail project. Upon completion of the study in spring 2021, two different alternatives for service were presented, one of which would terminate at Buzzards Bay and the other of which would continue to Bourne station.
