= Cape Codder (train) =

Passenger train in the northeast US

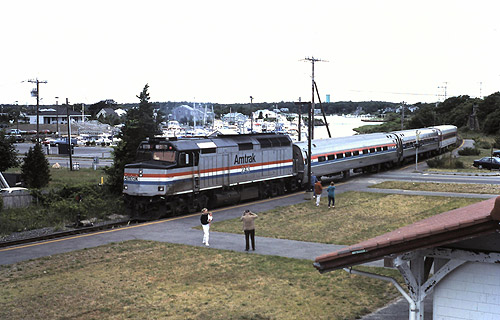
- The Cape Codder at Buzzards Bay in July 1996

Overview
- Service type: Inter-city rail
- Status: Discontinued
- Locale: New York, Connecticut, Rhode Island, Massachusetts
- Predecessor: Day Cape Codder
- First service: July 3, 1986
- Last service: September 29, 1996
- Former operator(s): New York, New Haven and Hartford Railroad; Amtrak

Route
- Termini: New York City; Hyannis, Massachusetts
- Stops: 8
- Distance travelled: 264 miles (425 km)
- Average journey time: 6 hours 28 minutes
- Service frequency: Weekly
- Train number(s): 234/235

On-board services
- Class(es): Reserved coach and Club Service
- Catering facilities: On-board cafe

Technical
- Rolling stock: Amfleet coaches
- Track gauge: 4 ft 8 1/2 in (1,435 mm)

The Cape Codder was a seasonal passenger train operated by Amtrak between New York City and Hyannis, Massachusetts, on Cape Cod. It operated during the summer between 1986 and 1996. It was the first regular service from New York to the Cape since 1964. The New York, New Haven and Hartford Railroad previously had operated a train under this name until 1958.

From its demise in 1996 there was no passenger rail service to Cape Cod until the beginning of the summer of 2013 when the MBTA's CapeFLYER began connecting Boston's South Station to Hyannis.

== History ==
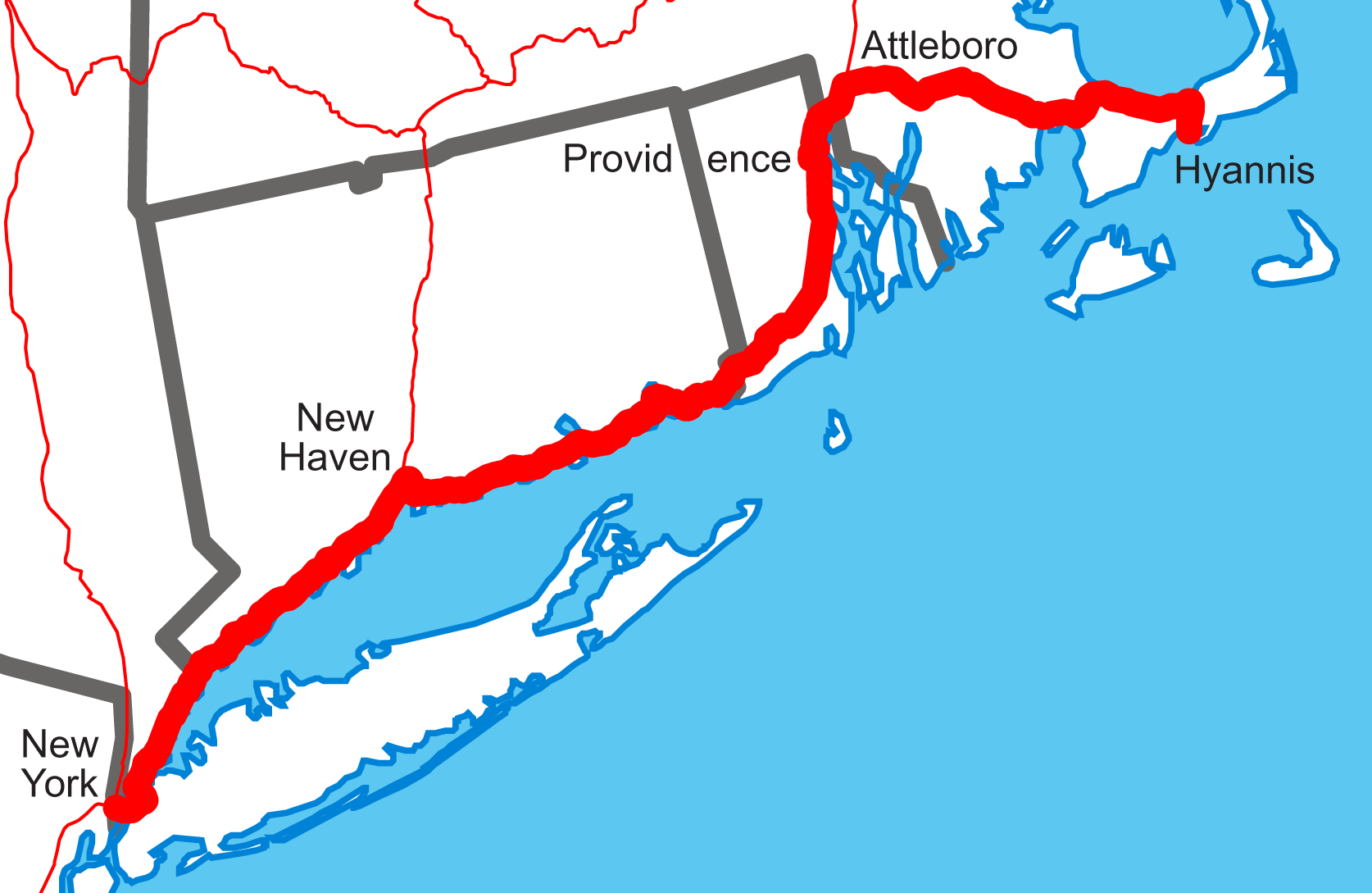
The Cape Codder used the Northeast Corridor to Attleboro, Massachusetts, where it split to reach Cape Cod

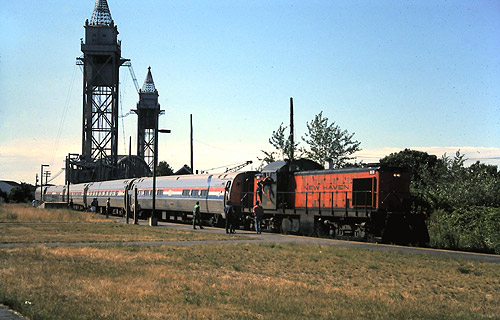
The Cape Codder at Buzzards Bay, with an ex-New Haven Railroad RS-1 leading, in July 1990

=== NY, NH & H service ===
Service beyond Harwich to Provincetown at the end of the Cape ended by the late 1930s. Regular service was suspended from 1941 to 1948, owing to World War II. The New York, New Haven and Hartford Railroad ran combined through trains with the Pennsylvania Railroad from Washington to Hyannis until 1958. The Day Cape Codder and Neptune combined to provide service six days per week July–September, with the Day Cape Codder operating all days except Wednesday and Friday and the Neptune operating on Fridays only. The trains ran from New York to Hyannis, with a section splitting at Buzzards Bay, Massachusetts for Woods Hole, Massachusetts. Passengers coming from Boston connected in Providence, Rhode Island. The PRR and the NH offered a night train, The Night Cape Codder, from Washington and New York on Friday nights. The companies offered a return train from the Cape on Sunday nights. The companies' New York–Cape Cod service from 1958 to 1964 was summer only. The New Haven Railroad stopped serving Cape Cod altogether in 1964.

The train operated as an express in Connecticut and on the Cape. In the latter case, it bypassed stations served by the Boston-Hyannis trains.

Station stops on Day Cape Codder: Grand Central Terminal, 125th Street, Stamford, New Haven, New London, Providence, Taunton, Buzzards Bay, Yarmouth, Hyannis. The stations from 125th to Providence were only for receiving passengers, heading east, and the oppose, when heading west. At Buzzard Bay, a branch would split for Woods Hole where passengers could catch steamers for Nantucket Island.

=== Amtrak service ===
Amtrak launched the Cape Codder on July 3, 1986. The original schedule included four trains weekly: trains from New York to Hyannis on Friday evening (#272) and Saturday morning (#270), and trains from Hyannis to New York on Saturday (#271) and Sunday afternoon (#273). Amtrak advertised the service as "Washington–New York–Hyannis", although only #272 originated in Washington. All other connections required a connecting train. The train operated through September and featured "Club Service: Deluxe reserved seating. Beverages and complimentary meals served at your seat.".

For the 1988 season Amtrak established connections with the Cape Cod and Hyannis Railroad, a tourist railroad which in partnership with Massachusetts offered daily service from Boston to the Cape, originating at the Braintree MBTA station. Amtrak passengers coming off the Northeast Corridor could be through-ticketed destinations on the Cape and would change to Cape Cod and Hyannis train at Attleboro. Separate sections served Hyannis and Falmouth. This service supplemented the weekend Cape Codder, once again providing daily service to the Cape. This interline service did not resume in 1989 after the Cape Cod and Hyannis Railroad folded. Amtrak service to Attleboro ended at the same time. Massachusetts provided financial support for the trains from 1986–1988.

Beginning in 1989 Amtrak truncated the Saturday round-trip to Providence with a scheduled connection to another train; this round-trip was named Clamdigger for the 1990 season and given new numbers (#433 westbound and #438 eastbound). The Friday/Sunday train pair became #234/#235. By 1993 the Saturday service was gone and the Friday/Sunday pair operated to New York only, with connections south. For its final season in 1996 the Cape Codder originated in Boston, ran down the Northeast Corridor to Providence, then turned and ran east to Hyannis. Service from Washington and New York was available via a connecting train in Providence.

Amtrak did not resume the Cape Codder for the 1997 season. The limited schedule, coupled with the fact that passengers found it difficult to navigate the Cape without an automobile, discouraged potential passengers. The service carried just 1,200 passengers in 1996, representing a 50% drop from 1995.

Since its demise in 1996, were periodic discussions about reinstating passenger rail service from Boston to reduce car traffic to and from the Cape, with officials in Bourne seeking to extend MBTA Commuter Rail service from Middleboro to Buzzards Bay. Scheduled passenger service between Boston and Hyannis resumed in May 2013 with the inauguration of the CapeFLYER, a collaboration between the Cape Cod Regional Transit Authority and the Massachusetts Bay Transportation Authority, and it was made permanent in the 2014 summer season after a successful trial run during the first year.

== See also ==
- Cape Cod Central Railroad
- Cape Cod Railroad
- CapeFlyer
- Massachusetts Coastal Railroad
- Old Colony Railroad
