= Hyannis Transportation Center =

Railway station in Hyannis, Massachusetts, United States

Hyannis
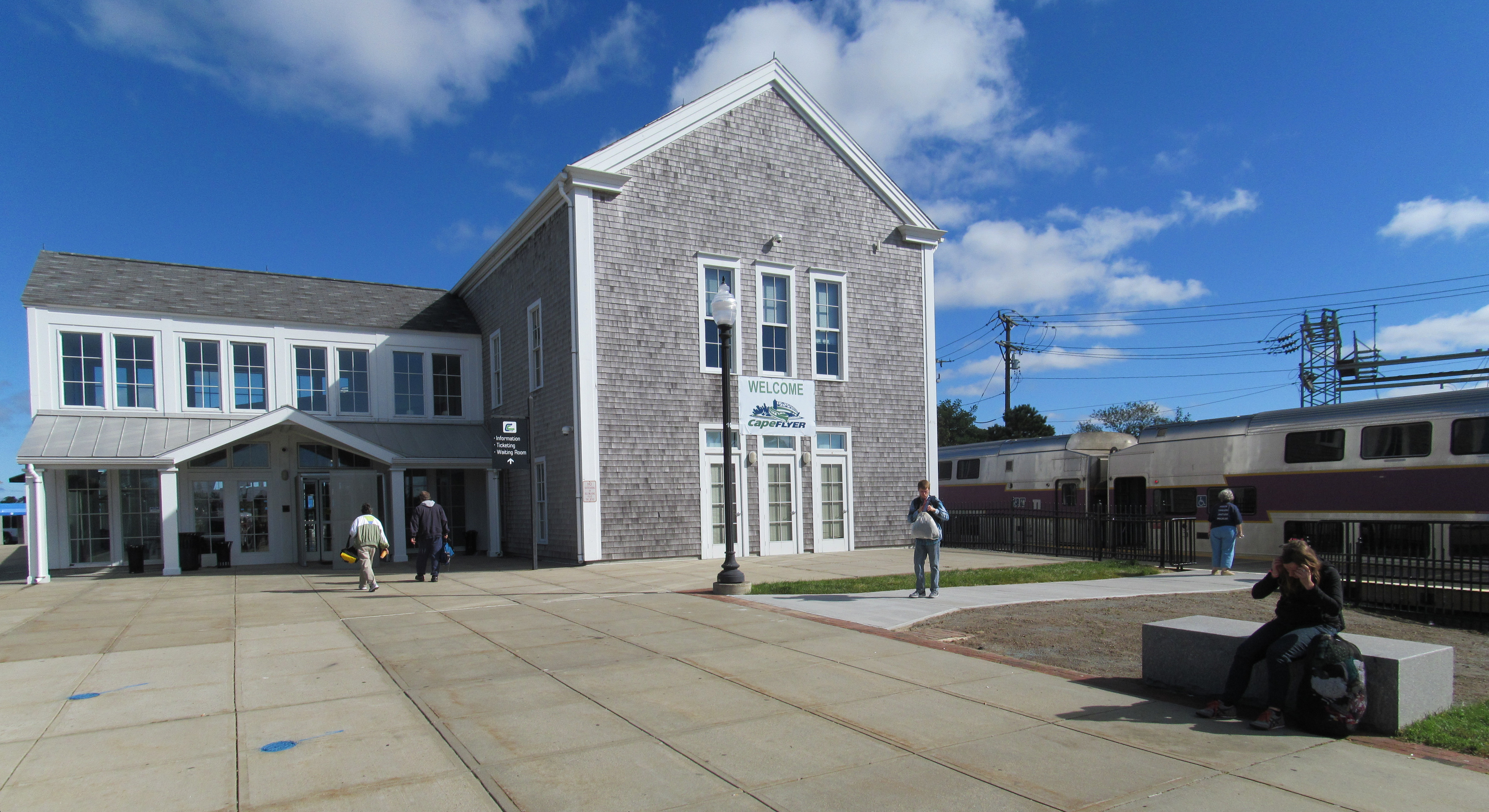
- Hyannis Transportation Center with a CapeFlyer train in 2013

General information
- Location: 1 Transportation Avenue (Transportation Center); 252 Main Street (Cape Cod Central station); Hyannis, Massachusetts
- Coordinates: 41°39′22″N 70°16′48″W
- Owner: Cape Cod Regional Transit Authority
- Line: Cape Main Line (Hyannis Branch)
- Platforms: 2 side platforms
- Connections: CCRTA: Barnstable Villager, H2O, Hyannis Crosstown, Hyannis Trolley, Sandwich Line, Sealine; Peter Pan, Plymouth & Brockton

Construction
- Parking: Short-term (free); Long-term (160 spaces, $6/day)
- Cycle facilities: Yes
- Accessible: Yes

History
- Opened: July 8, 1854; July 1981
- Closed: 1964
- Rebuilt: c. 1900; April 23, 1953; 2002

Services
Preceding station	MBTA	Following station
Bourne toward South Station	CapeFLYER	Terminus
Preceding station	Cape Cod Central Railroad	Following station
West Barnstable toward Buzzards Bay	Main Line	Terminus
Former services
Preceding station	Amtrak	Following station
West Barnstable toward New York	Cape Codder 1986–1996	Terminus
Preceding station	Cape Cod and Hyannis Railroad	Following station
West Barnstable toward Braintree or Attleboro	Braintree-Hyannis 1984–1988	Terminus
Preceding station	New York, New Haven and Hartford Railroad	Following station
Yarmouth toward Boston	Boston–Hyannis	Terminus
Yarmouth toward New York	Cape Codder	Terminus
Location

The Hyannis Transportation Center (HTC) is an intermodal transportation center in Hyannis, Massachusetts, operated by the Cape Cod Regional Transit Authority (CCRTA). It is the terminus for several CCRTA bus lines and its CapeFLYER passenger train that operates on summer weekends between Boston South Station and Hyannis. It is also used by the Plymouth and Brockton Street Railway, Peter Pan Bus Lines, and Greyhound via CapeBus intercity bus services. The Cape Cod Central Railroad uses a separate station building across the tracks for its excursion services. A rail yard used by the Cape Cod Central is located north of the station, along with a former roundhouse.

The first Hyannis station was built by the Cape Cod Railroad in 1854. It was replaced by a nearly-identical structure in the early 1900s. The New Haven Railroad used a separate station 1.0 mile (1.6 km) north from 1953 until passenger service ended in 1964. The Cape Cod Central began excursion service in 1981; part of a former gas station was converted for use as a station. The station was also used by the Cape Cod and Hyannis Railroad from 1984 to 1988, and the Amtrak Cape Codder. The Hyannis Transportation Center opened in 2002, with a second platform opposite the Cape Cod Central platform. It was only used by buses until CapeFLYER service began in 2013.

== History ==
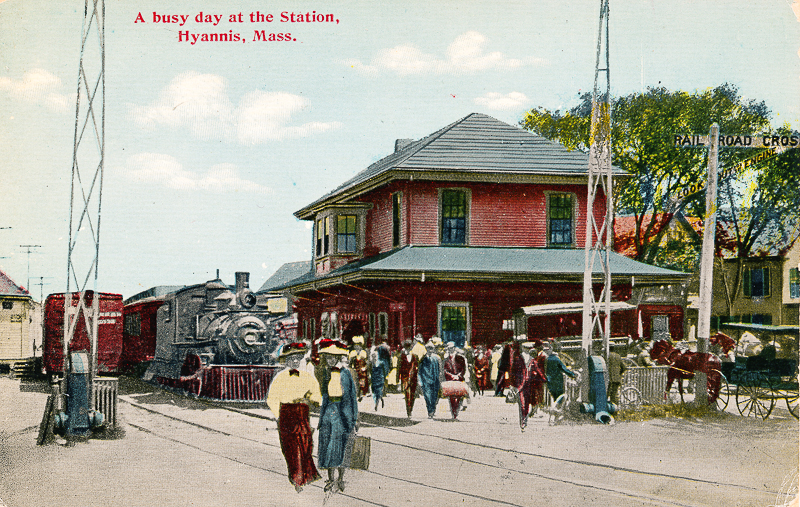
Postcard of Hyannis station, c. 1914

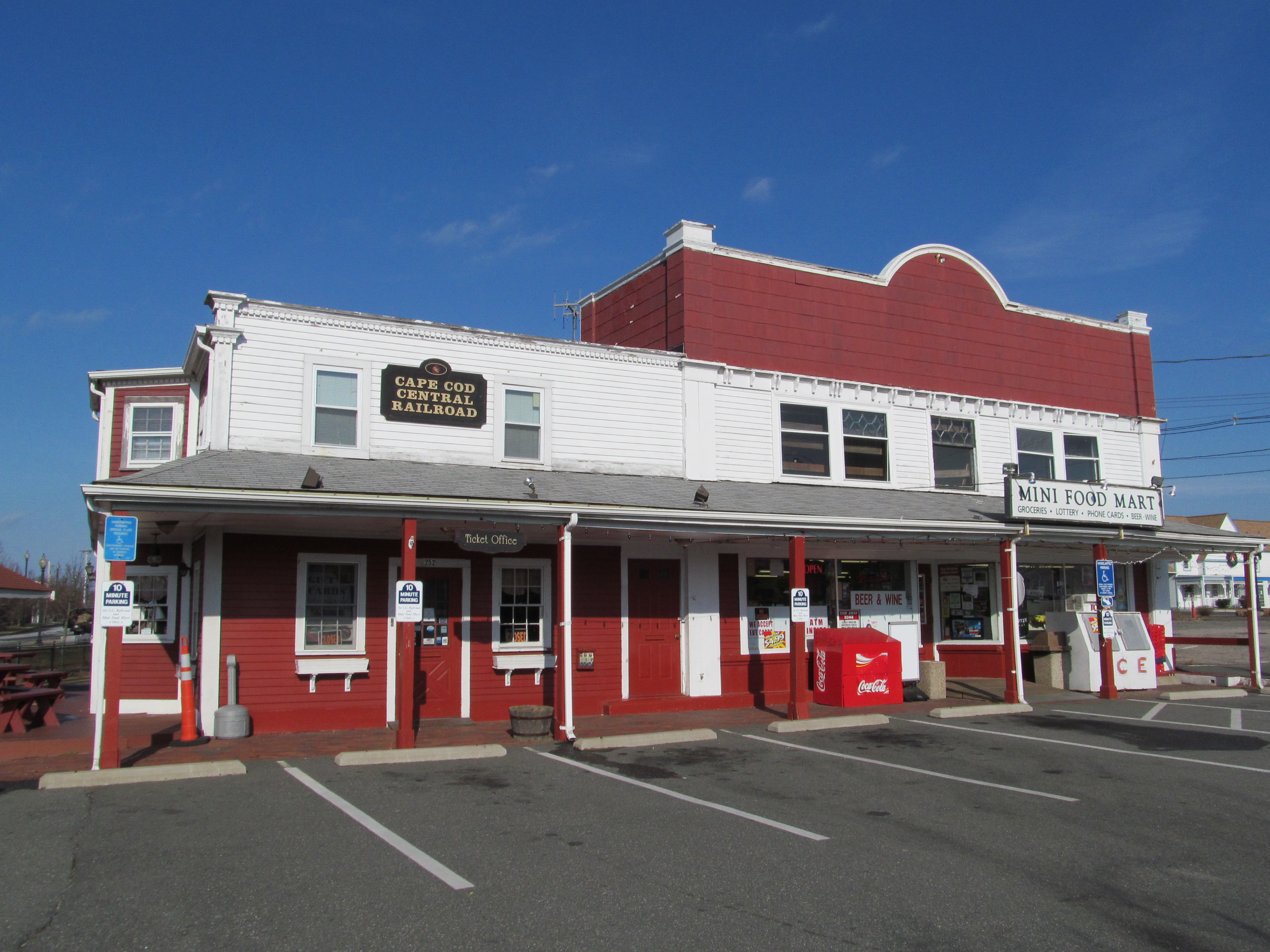
The Cape Cod Central station in 2012

The first Hyannis station was constructed in the early 1850s by the Cape Cod Railroad in time for the arrival of the first train from Boston on July 8, 1854. It is said that the train was met by a crowd estimated at 3,000. Immediately the line started running three trains a day to and from Boston. Tracks continued 1.6 miles (2.6 km) south to Hyannis Wharf, where ferries connected to Martha's Vineyard and Nantucket Island. Passenger service between Hyannis Wharf and Hyannis ended in July 1872 when the Woods Hole Branch was opened, though freight service continued until 1937.

The line became part of the Old Colony Railroad in 1872; the Old Colony in turn was leased by the New Haven Railroad in 1893. The original repair shops at Hyannis, damaged by fire in 1857, were destroyed by another fire in 1898. They were never rebuilt, but a replacement roundhouse was built in 1901. The original station was replaced in the early 1900s by a nearly-identical building. Through the first half of the 20th century, the station supported year-round service to Boston and seasonal service to New York City.

On April 23, 1953, the New Haven moved to a new station 1.0 mile (1.6 km) to the north, and the older station was soon demolished. The final summer for the New Haven's nighttime Cape Codder service was in 1958. Regular passenger service to Boston ended in 1959, with limited summer service (including the last Day Cape Codder) until 1964; the 1953-built station was reused for commercial purposes.

The roundhouse was sold to a moving company in 1954, and sold again and renovated as a nightclub in 1980. It was placed on the Massachusetts Register of Historic Places on October 3, 1996. The building and surrounding property were sold to Hy-Line Cruises in 2015 for parking and storage. Hy-Line proposed to demolish the building in 2019, but withdrew the application after pressure from historical and civic groups.

In July 1981, the Cape Cod Central Railroad began summer-only excursion service between Hyannis and Sandwich. Part of a former gas station in Hyannis, built sometime between 1900 and 1930 just northeast of the New Haven Railroad station, was converted for use as a station. The station was served by the Cape Cod and Hyannis Railroad from 1984 to 1988, and the Amtrak Cape Codder from 1986 to 1996. The station platform on the east side of the mainline is approximately 645 feet (197 m) long, which accommodates a seven car train.

The larger Hyannis Transportation Center (HTC) was constructed just to the north in 2002, with a platform on the opposite side of the same track. Seasonal CapeFLYER service, which began in 2013, uses the newly-constructed station, while the Cape Cod Central Railroad continues to use the older station, though the accessible high-level platform of the HTC is often used. As of 2020, Hyannis serves as the point of departure for several excursion trains running to Cape Cod Canal and back, often including a stop at West Barnstable and sometimes an additional stop at the historic Pairpoint Glass facility in Sagamore. Hyannis also serves as the point of departure for a variety of dining trains.

As of January 2025, MassDOT plans to reconstruct the deteriorated wooden accessible platform at the station.
