= Provincetown station =

Railway station in Provincetown, Massachusetts, United States

Provincetown
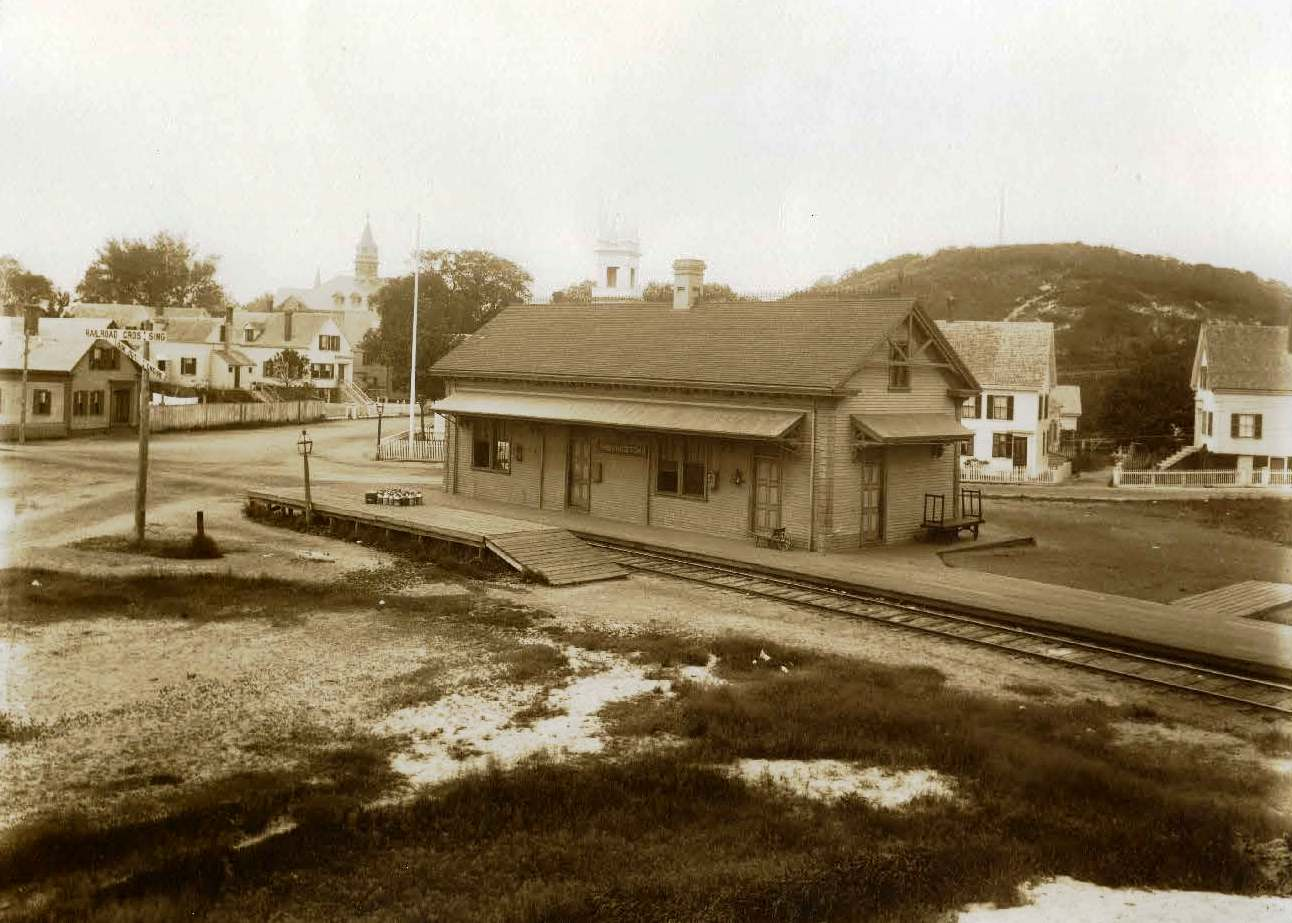
- Provincetown station in the late 1800s

General information
- Location: Bradford Street at Standish Street; Provincetown, Massachusetts
- Coordinates: 42°03′11.87″N 70°11′10.82″W

History
- Opened: July 22, 1873
- Closed: 1960

Former services
Preceding station	New York, New Haven and Hartford Railroad	Following station
Terminus	Boston–Provincetown	Puritan Heights toward Boston
Location

Provincetown station was a train station located on Bradford Street (formerly Back Street) between Alden and Standish Streets in Provincetown, Massachusetts.

The first scheduled train by the Old Colony Railroad arrived in Provincetown on July 23, 1873, to much fanfare. It was reported that when the first train with dignitaries arrived the day before, old cannons boomed out salutes, church bells were rung and a brass band helped the crowd march up to the Pavilion on High Pole Hill.

New York, New Haven and Hartford Railroad passenger service to Provincetown ended in July 1938 (excepting a brief restoration of service in 1940), but freight service survived until 1960, when the tracks above North Eastham were formally abandoned.
