= Bridgewater station (MBTA) =

Railway station in Bridgewater, Massachusetts, US

Bridgewater
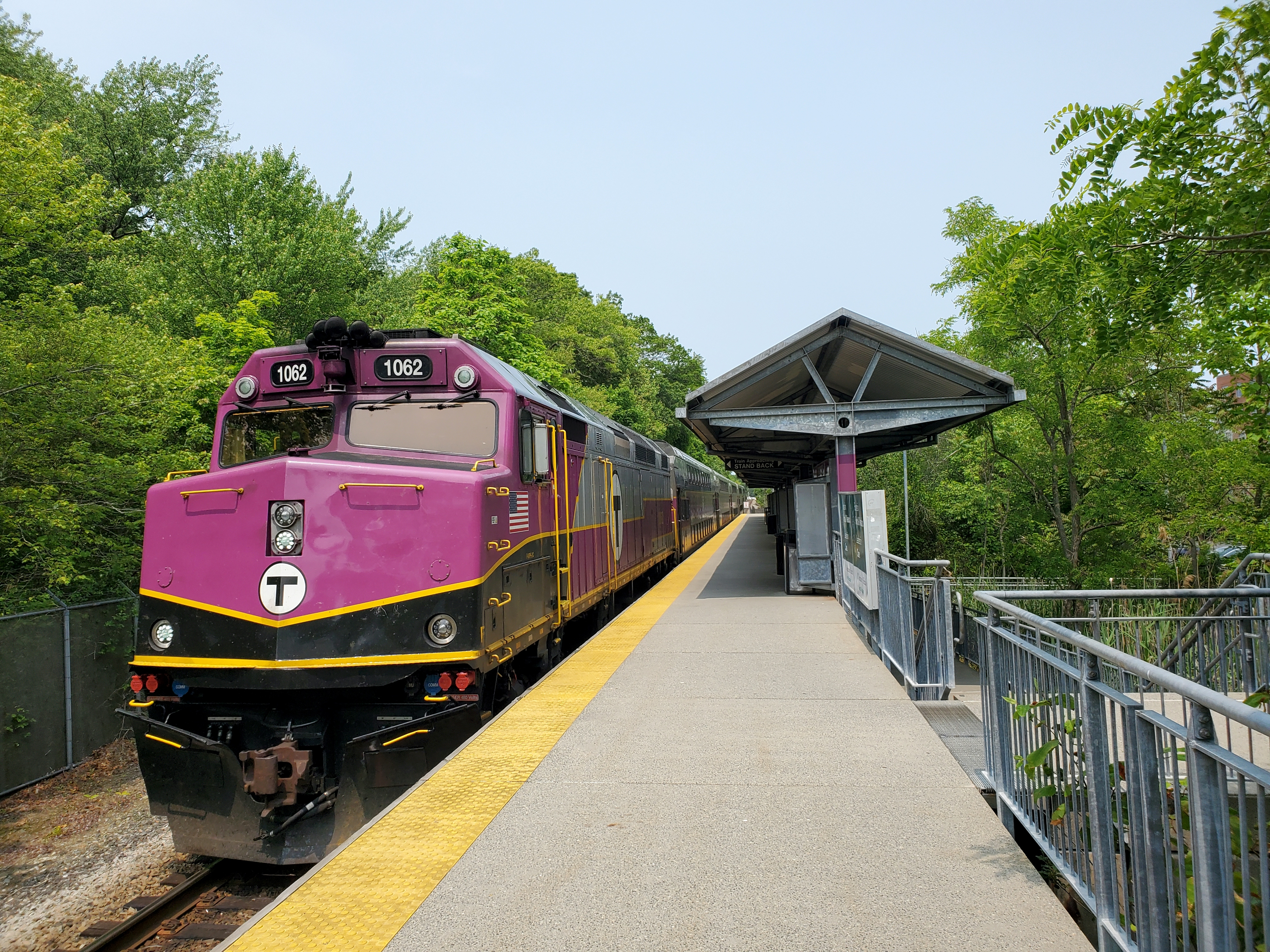
- An outbound train at Bridgewater station in 2025

General information
- Location: 80 Burrill Avenue; Bridgewater, Massachusetts
- Coordinates: 41.9853°N 70.9658°W
- Line: Middleborough Main Line
- Platforms: 1 side platform
- Tracks: 1

Construction
- Parking: 497 spaces
- Cycle facilities: 24 spaces
- Accessible: Yes

Other information
- Fare zone: 6

History
- Opened: September 29, 1997

Passengers
- 2024: 529 daily boardings

Services
Preceding station	MBTA	Following station
Campello toward South Station	Fall River/New Bedford Line	Middleborough toward Fall River or New Bedford
Former services
Preceding station	MBTA	Following station
Campello toward South Station	Middleborough/Lakeville Line Until 2025 extension	Middleborough/Lakeville Terminus
Preceding station	Cape Cod and Hyannis Railroad	Following station
Brockton toward Braintree	Braintree-Hyannis 1984-1988	Middleborough toward Hyannis or Falmouth
Preceding station	New York, New Haven and Hartford Railroad	Following station
Westdale toward Boston	Boston–Middleborough	Titicut toward Middleborough
Brockton toward Boston	Boston–Woods Hole	Middleborough toward Woods Hole
Brockton toward Boston	Boston–Hyannis	Middleborough toward Hyannis
Location

Bridgewater station is an MBTA Commuter Rail station in Bridgewater, Massachusetts, served by the Fall River/New Bedford Line. It is located on the east end of the Bridgewater State University campus along the Middleborough Main Line.

== History ==
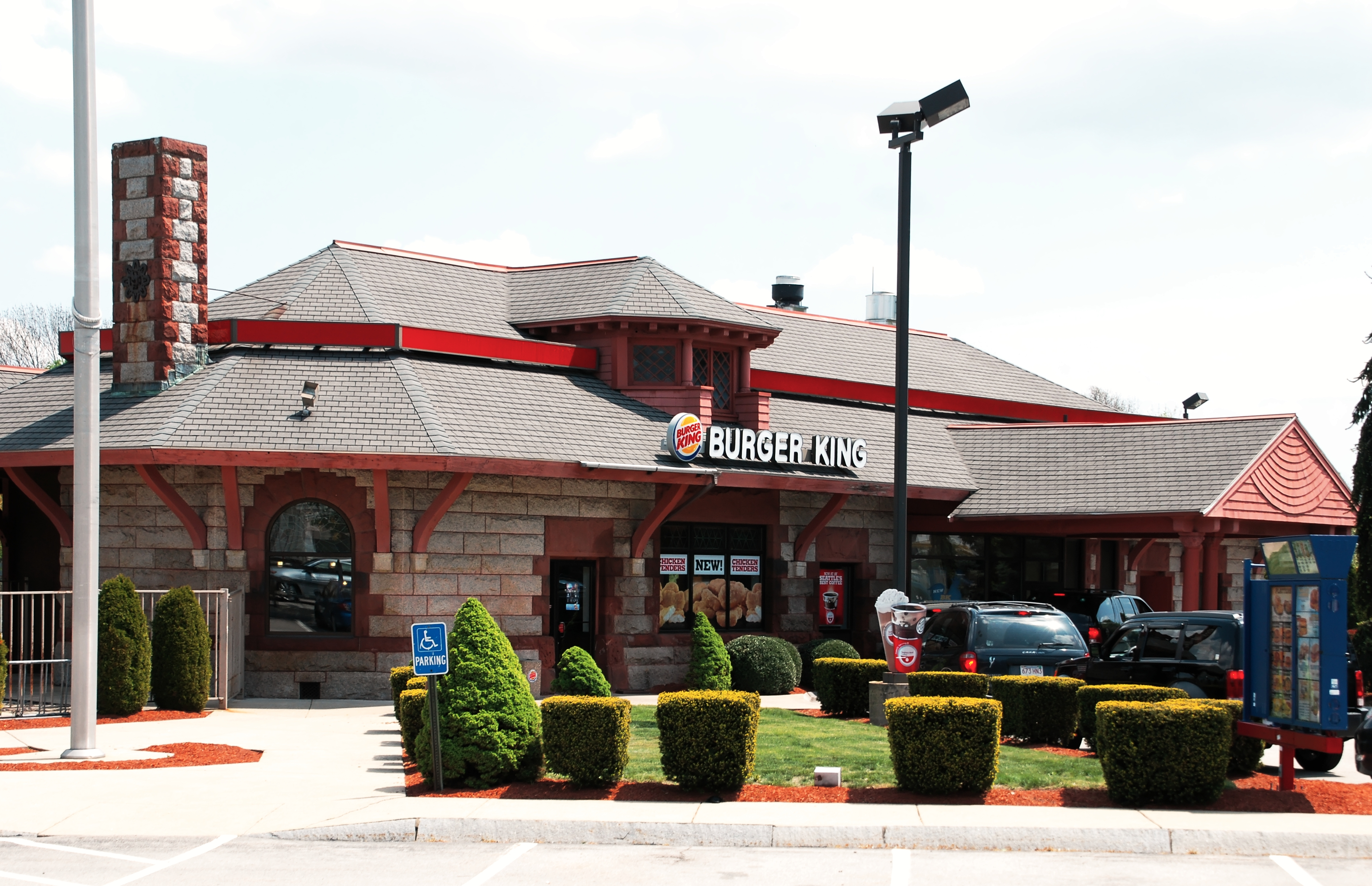
The former Bridgewater station in 2010

The final section of the Fall River Railroad opened between North Bridgewater and Middleborough opened on December 21, 1846, completing the line between South Braintree and Fall River. The railroad merged into the Old Colony and Fall River Railroad in 1854; it became the Old Colony and Newport Railroad in 1863, then the Old Colony Railroad in 1872. The line was originally single track; the second track was extended from Campello to Bridgewater in 1884.

The original station was replaced by the Old Colony with a wooden structure with a hip roof. The New York, New Haven and Hartford Railroad acquired the Old Colony in 1893. The next year, it constructed a new station designed by New York architect Bradford Gilbert. The Romanesque structure was built from Milford pink granite with brownstone trim.

Old Colony Division passenger service ended on June 30, 1959. The Cape Cod & Hyannis Railroad stopped at Bridgewater from 1984 to 1988. The modern station opened on September 29, 1997, along with the rest of the Middleborough/Lakeville and Plymouth/Kingston Lines. It is located southeast of downtown Bridgewater at the Bridgewater State University campus. The former station building has been repurposed as a Burger King restaurant.
