= Lakeville station =

Rail station in Lakeville, Massachusetts, US

Lakeville
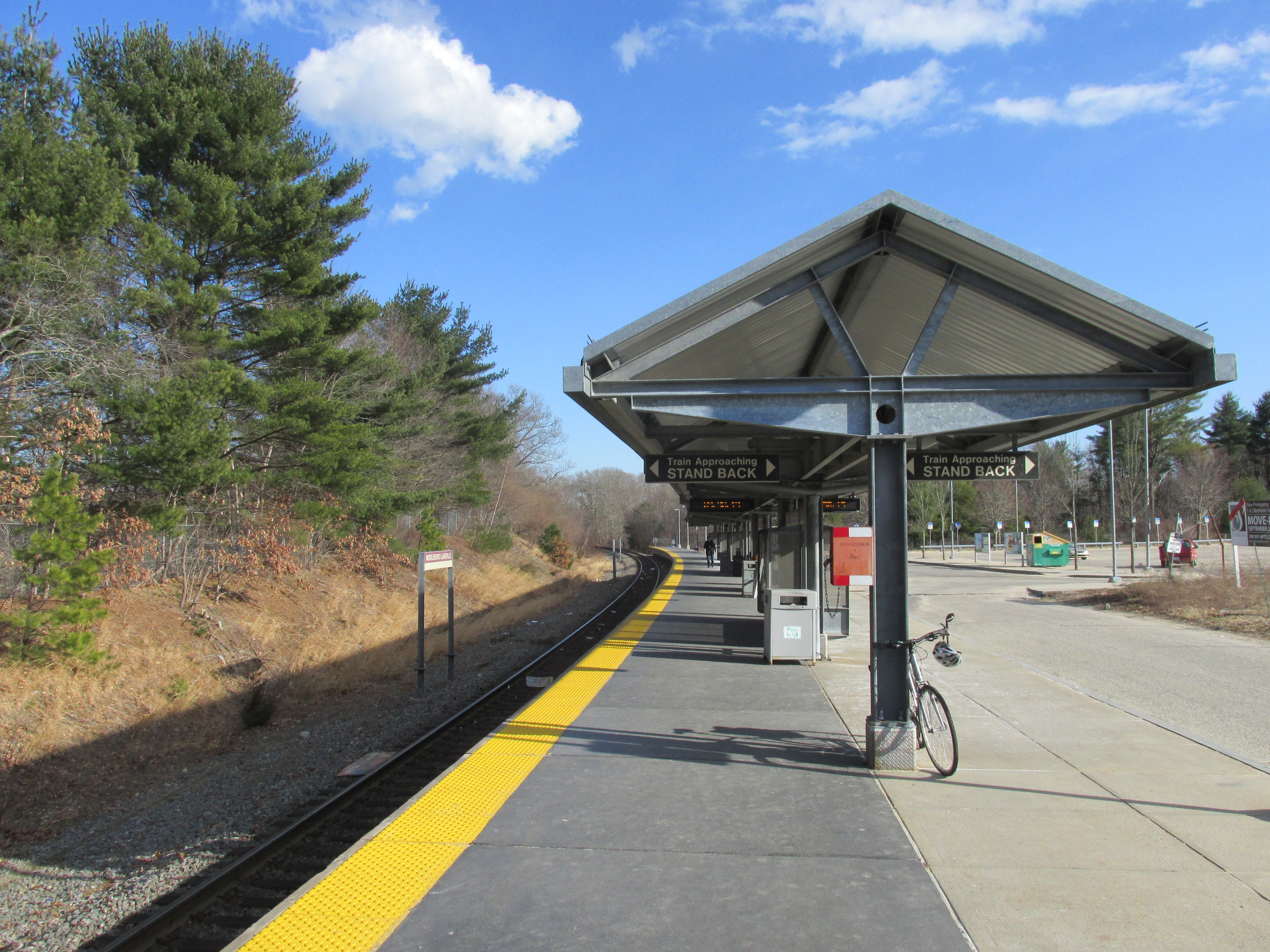
- The station in March 2013

General information
- Location: 125 Commercial Drive; Lakeville, Massachusetts
- Coordinates: 41.87820°N 70.91835°W
- Line: Cape Main Line
- Platforms: 1 side platform
- Tracks: 1
- Connections: GATRA: Downtown Middleborough Shuttle

Construction
- Parking: 769 spaces ($4.00 fee)
- Cycle facilities: 8 spaces
- Accessible: Yes

History
- Opened: September 29, 1997
- Former names: Middleborough/Lakeville (until March 24, 2025)

Services
Preceding station	MBTA	Following station
Brockton toward South Station	CapeFLYER	Wareham Village toward Hyannis

Former services
Preceding station	MBTA	Following station
Bridgewater toward South Station	Middleborough/Lakeville Line	Terminus
Location

Lakeville station (formerly Middleborough/Lakeville station) is a train station on the border between Middleborough and Lakeville, Massachusetts. It is served by the seasonal CapeFlyer service between Boston and Cape Cod. Lakeville station has a single full-length high-level side platform serving the single track of the Cape Main Line.

An older station was located in downtown Middleborough, serving passenger service from 1846 to 1959 and Cape Cod and Hyannis Railroad service from 1984 to 1988. Middleborough/Lakeville station opened on September 29, 1997, as the terminus of the Middleborough/Lakeville Line of the MBTA Commuter Rail system. Seasonal CapeFlyer service began in 2013. The station was closed to commuter rail service on March 24, 2025, when Middleborough station opened as part of the South Coast Rail project. The station was renamed Lakeville and remained open for CapeFlyer service.

== Station layout ==
The station is located on Commercial Drive off South Main Street (Massachusetts Route 105) south of the Interstate 495 interchange. The station has a single curved high-level side platform, about 835 feet (255 m) long, on the west side of the single-track Cape Main Line. The 769-space parking lot and most of the platform are in Lakeville, while the northern portion of the platform is in Middleboro. Lakeville station is fully accessible.

== History ==
=== Former service ===
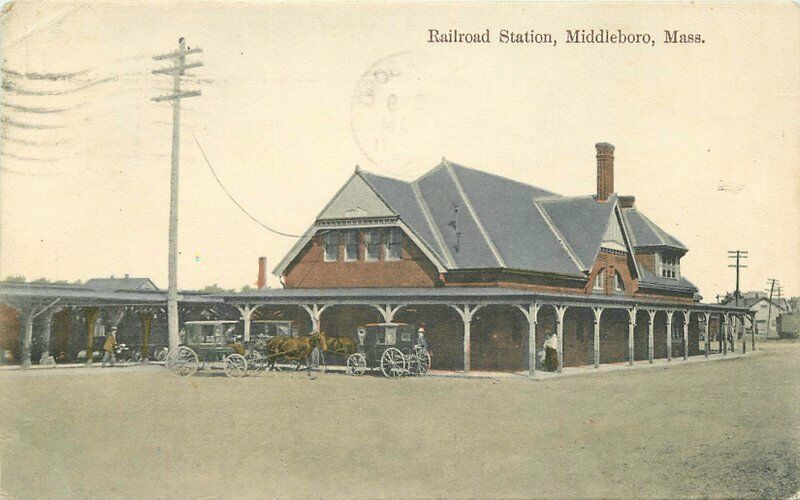
A 1911 postcard of Middleborough station

The Fall River Railroad opened between South Braintree and Fall River in stages from June 1845 to December 1846. Middleborough station was located at Courtland Street at the west edge of the downtown area. Haskins station (renamed Lakeville by 1854) was located on Bedford Street. Two other stations were located in Middleborough on the 1856-opened Cape Main Line southeast of downtown: Rock (also known as Rock Meeting House) at Miller Street in Rock Village, and South Middleboro at Spruce Street.

Middleborough became a major railroad junction, with lines in five directions to Boston, Plymouth, Cape Cod, Fall River, and Taunton by 1892. The New Haven Railroad leased the Old Colony Railroad – which owned all lines meeting at Middleborough – in 1893. Lakeville station was briefly renamed Montwait, then back to Lakeville.

Service declined in the 20th century; passenger service on the lines to Taunton and Plymouth ended in 1927, followed by the original line to Fall River in 1931. The latter two lines were soon abandoned. The former Lakeville station, constructed in 1879, is still extant and has been converted for residential use. Rock and South Middleboro stations were closed on July 17, 1938, as part of a massive station closure.

Commuter service between Cape Cod and Boston via Middleborough ended on June 30, 1959. The lines north, west, and southeast from Middleborough remained in use for freight service: by the New Haven until 1969, Penn Central to 1971, Conrail to 1997, and CSX since. Freight service southeast from Middleborough was taken over by the Bay Colony Railroad shortline in 1982 and the Massachusetts Coastal Railroad in 2007, interchanging with CSX at Middleborough Yard.

=== MBTA era ===
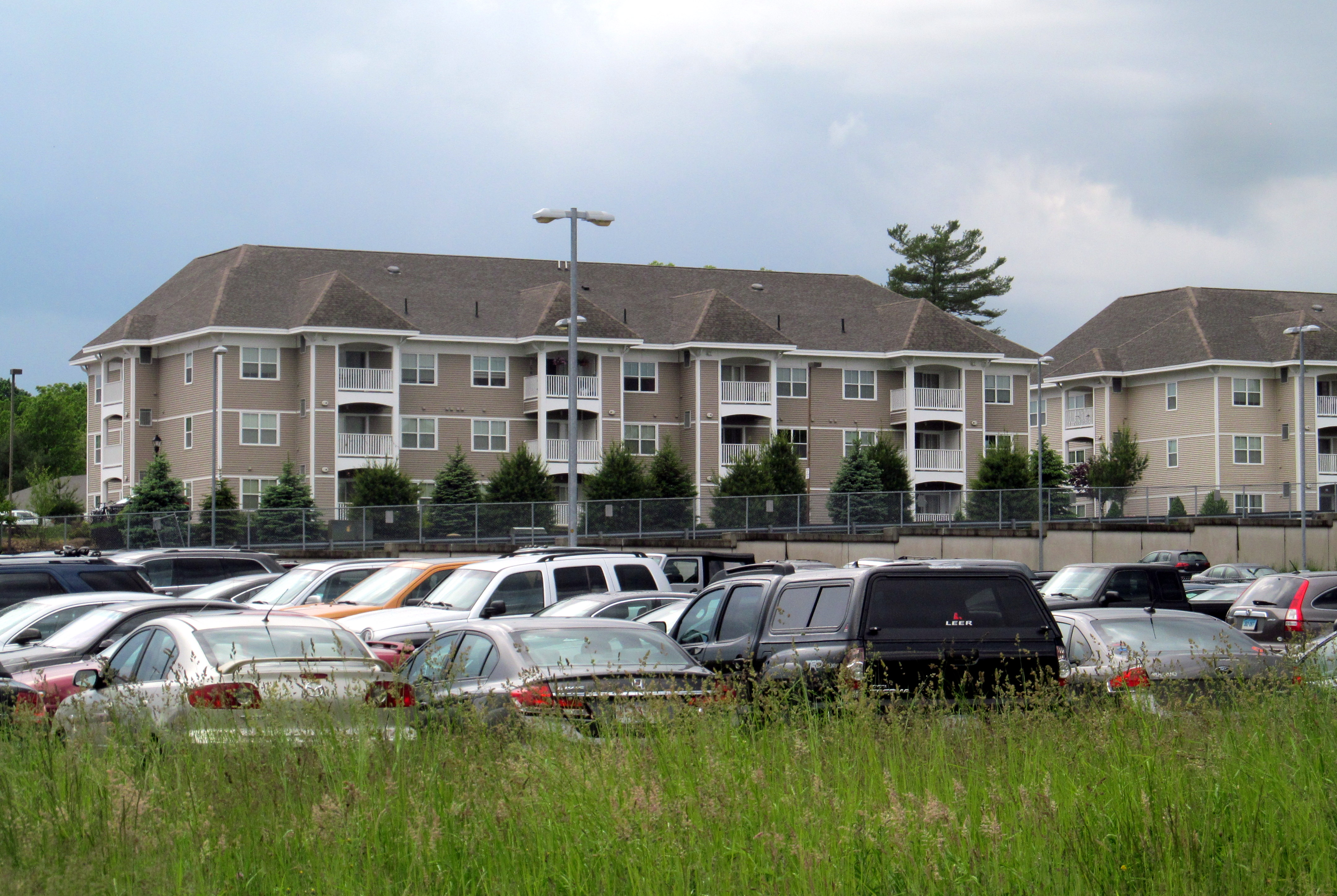
A nearby apartment complex built as transit-oriented development

Restoration of passenger service was proposed intermittently through the 1960s and 1970s. On October 15, 1979, a special train ran from Braintree to Middleborough to publicize the state's plans for restored service. A 1974 state analysis of restoring commuter rail service indicated that the Middleborough station could be reused. From 1984 to 1988, Cape Cod and Hyannis Railroad seasonal commuter and excursion service stopped in Middleborough at the former station. The former station was demolished in the 1990s.

In 1984, a state-directed Massachusetts Bay Transportation Authority (MBTA) study found that restoration of commuter rail service would be feasible. A Draft Environmental Impact Statement (DEIS) was released in May 1990, followed by a Final Environmental Impact Statement (FEIS) in 1992. Both called for a Middleborough/Lakeville station off Route 105 south of Middleborough on the Lakeville border, rather than reusing the old station site. MBTA Commuter Rail Middleborough/Lakeville Line service to Middleborough/Lakeville station began on September 29, 1997.

The station opened with around 400 parking spaces, which was immediately insufficient due to commuters driving from areas to the south as well as from Middleborough and Lakeville. The lot was expanded to 864 spaces in 2000. A dirt lot was closed in November 2003 due to safety concerns and falling demand after the completion of the Big Dig, reducing the station to 769 spaces. The station attracted transit-oriented development in the form of adjacent apartment complexes. A 2007 study of commuter service to Wareham and Buzzards Bay proposed an additional stop near the former Rock station site. CapeFlyer summer weekend service between Boston and Hyannis began on May 24, 2013, with a stop at Middleborough/Lakeville. With 867 daily boardings in 2018, Middleborough/Lakeville was the busiest station on the line.

=== South Coast Rail ===
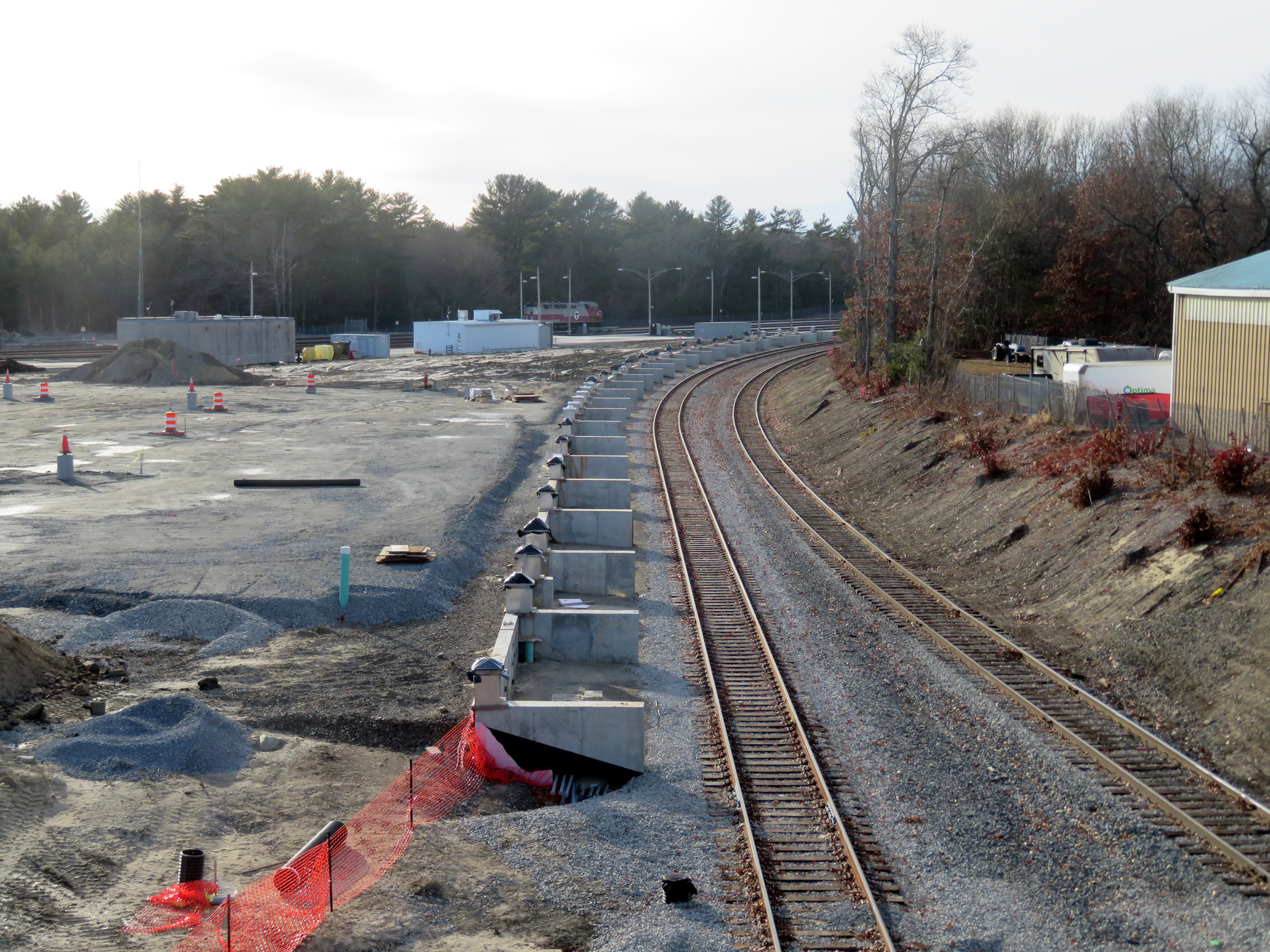
The new Middleborough station under construction in 2021

In 2017, the South Coast Rail project was re-evaluated due to cost issues. The new proposal called for early service via Middleborough by 2022, followed by full service via Stoughton by 2030. A new Middleborough station was to replace the existing Middleborough/Lakeville station, which could not be served by South Coast Rail trains. Middleborough and Lakeville officials were critical of the possibility of abandoning Middleborough/Lakeville station or requiring its riders to take a shuttle train, as well as possible traffic issues from a downtown Middleborough station.

The January 2018 Draft Supplemental Environmental Impact Report considered three potential operational patterns: a reverse move to serve the existing station, shuttle service from the existing station to Bridgewater station, or a new Middleborough station with a bus shuttle from the existing station. The latter was preferred because it had a shorter travel time than the reverse move, and would not require additional double track as the Bridgewater shuttle would. The new Middleborough station will be located in the wye (Pilgrim Junction) between the Middleborough Main Line and Middleboro Secondary. The CapeFlyer would continue to use Middleborough/Lakeville station, as the new station does not have a platform on the Middleborough Main Line. However, the new station includes space for a future platform to serve shuttle trains to Cape Cod. A construction contract for the new station was awarded in August 2020. South Coast Rail service began on March 24, 2025, as the Fall River/New Bedford Line. Middleborough/Lakeville station was renamed Lakeville station at that time.
