= Montello =

Montello may refer to:

== Places ==
=== Australia ===
- Montello, Tasmania, a suburb of Burnie

=== Italy ===
- Montello, Lombardy, a comune in the Province of Bergamo
- Montello (hill), a historic hillock in the Province of Treviso
- Crocetta del Montello, a comune in the Province of Treviso
- Giavera del Montello, a comune in the Province of Treviso
- Volpago del Montello, a comune in the Province of Treviso

=== United States ===
- Montello, Nevada
- Montello, Pennsylvania
- Montello, Wisconsin, a city
  - Montello Commercial Historic District
- Montello (town), Wisconsin, adjacent to the city
- Montello River, a river in Wisconsin
- Montello station, an MBTA railway station in Brockton, Massachusetts
  - Centre and Montello Streets Historic District

== People ==
- Montello (surname), people with the surname Montello

== Other uses ==
- Montello Bridging Finance, a defunct British real-estate finance company

== See also ==
- Montella (disambiguation)
