= Campello station =

Rail station in Brockton, Massachusetts, US

Campello
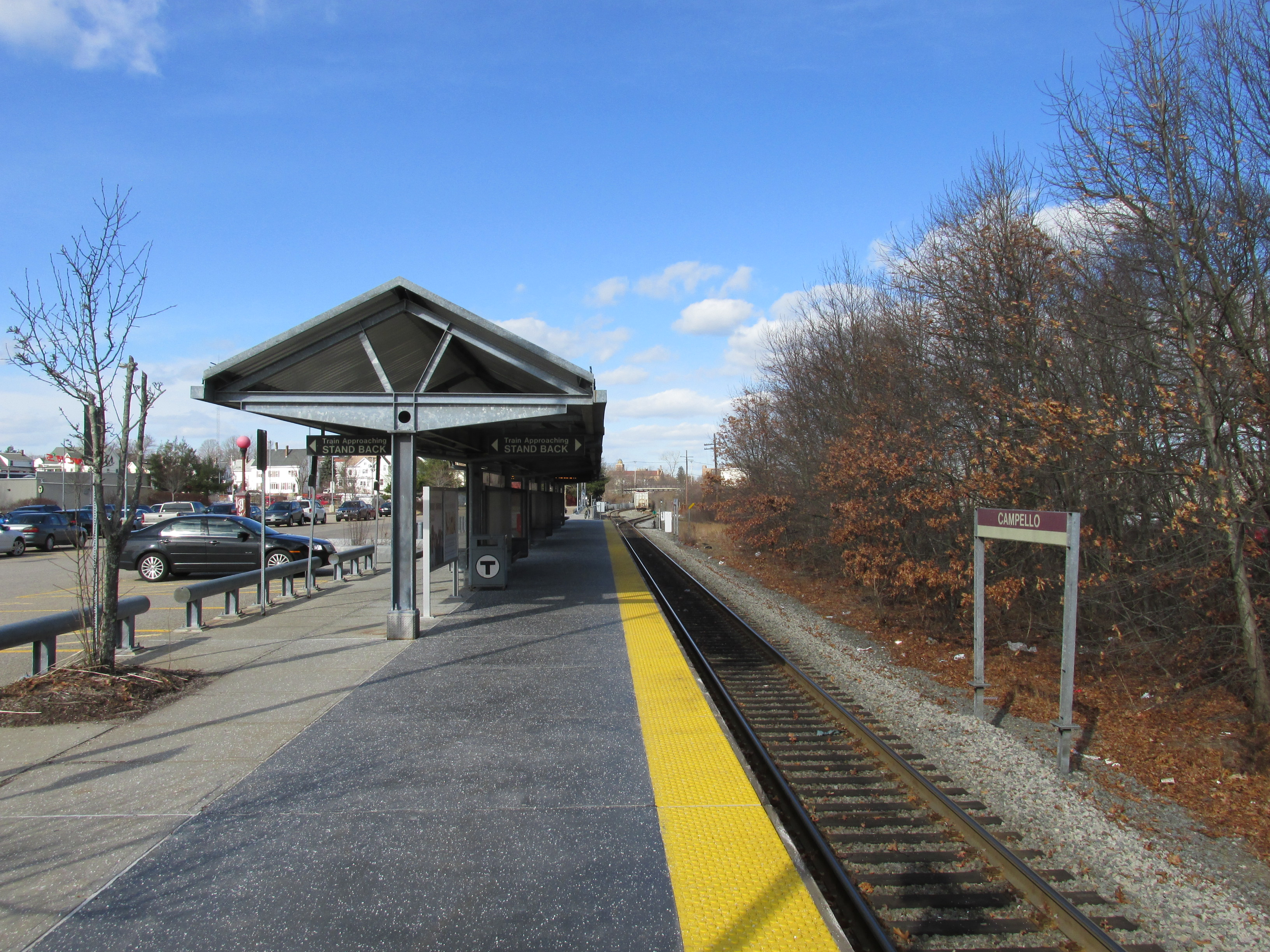
- Campello station in February 2013

General information
- Location: 30 Riverside Avenue; Brockton, Massachusetts
- Coordinates: 42.0609°N 71.0110°W
- Line: Middleborough Main Line
- Platforms: 1 side platform
- Tracks: 1
- Connections: BAT: 8, 12

Construction
- Parking: 546 spaces ($4.00 fee)
- Cycle facilities: 8 spaces
- Accessible: Yes

Other information
- Fare zone: 5

History
- Opened: 1846; September 26, 1997
- Closed: June 30, 1959 (former station)
- Former names: Plain Village (until c. 1850)

Passengers
- 2024: 357 daily boardings

Services
Preceding station	MBTA	Following station
Brockton toward South Station	Fall River/New Bedford Line	Bridgewater toward Fall River or New Bedford
Former services
Preceding station	New York, New Haven and Hartford Railroad	Following station
Brockton toward Boston	Boston–Middleborough	Matfield toward Middleborough
Location

Campello station is an MBTA Commuter Rail station in Brockton, Massachusetts, served by the Fall River/New Bedford Line.

== History ==
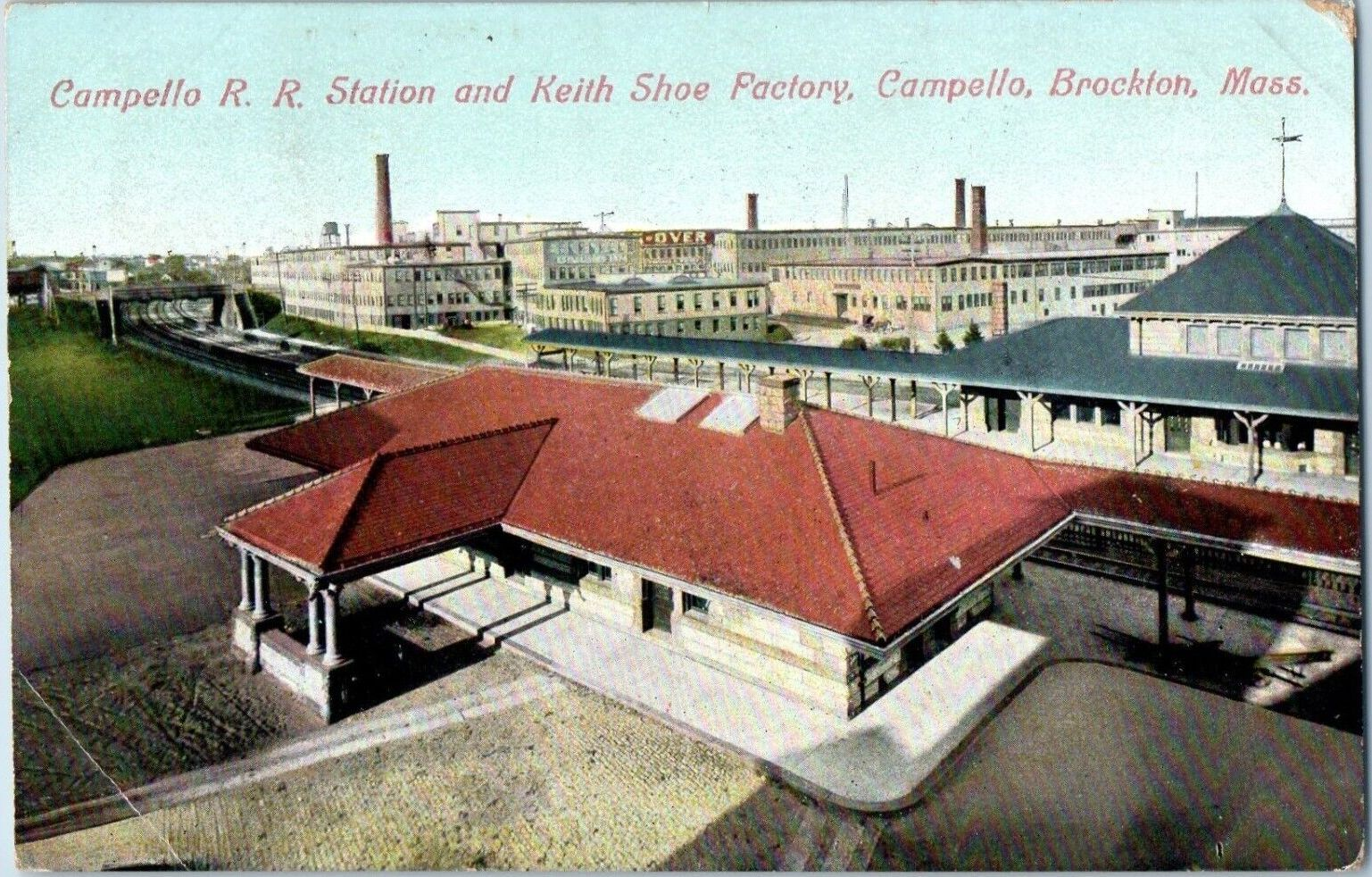
1908 postcard of Campello station

The final section of the Fall River Railroad opened between North Bridgewater and Middleborough opened on December 21, 1846, completing the line between South Braintree and Fall River. Among the initial stations on the line was Plain Village in the southern part of North Bridgewater (which was renamed Brockton in 1874). The village was renamed Campello in 1850, and the station was so renamed soon after.

A new station building was constructed in 1873–74. A engine house was built near the station in 1881. New station buildings on both sides of the tracks designed by Bradford Gilbert, as well as a new freight house, were built at Capello around 1896 during the elimination of grade crossings in Brockton.

Old Colony Division passenger service ended on June 30, 1959. By that time, passengers used a small wooden shelter rather than the abandoned stone station.

The modern station opened on September 26, 1997, along with the rest of the Middleborough/Lakeville Line. The Riverside Avenue entrance to the parking lot was indefinitely closed in September 2023.
