= Montiglio =

Montiglio may refer to:

- Montiglio, village in Montiglio Monferrato, Italian commune in Piedmont
- Montiglio (surname), Italian surname

== See also ==
- Montello (disambiguation)
