= Brockton station (MBTA) =

Railway station in Brockton, Massachusetts, US

Brockton
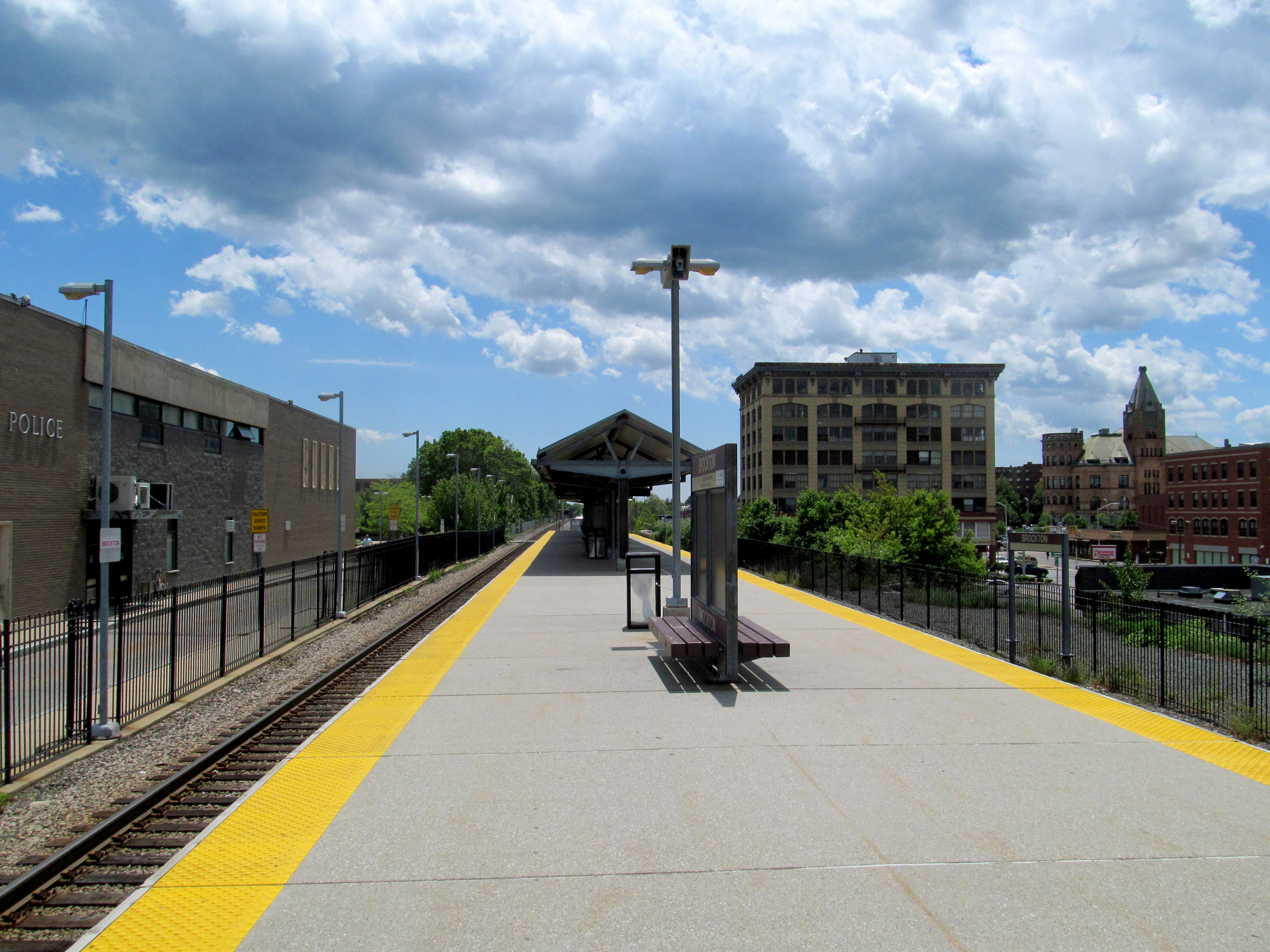
- Brockton station and the Anglim Building in 2017

General information
- Location: 7 Commercial Street; Brockton, Massachusetts
- Coordinates: 42.0847°N 71.01655°W
- Line: Middleborough Main Line
- Platforms: 1 island platform
- Tracks: 2
- Connections: BAT: 1, 2, 3, 4, 4A, 5, 6, 8, 9, 10/11, 12, 13, 14, BSU 28; GATRA: Gateway Link

Construction
- Parking: 266 spaces ($3.00 daily)
- Cycle facilities: 8 spaces
- Accessible: Yes

Other information
- Fare zone: 4

History
- Opened: October 1846 (original station); September 29, 1997 (modern station)
- Closed: June 30, 1959 (former station)
- Rebuilt: 1894–1897
- Former names: North Bridgewater (until May 7, 1874)

Passengers
- 2024: 560 daily boardings

Services
| Preceding station | MBTA | Following station |
|---|---|---|
| Montello toward South Station | Fall River/New Bedford Line | Campello toward Fall River or New Bedford |
| Braintree toward South Station | CapeFLYER | Lakeville toward Hyannis |
Former services
| Preceding station | Cape Cod and Hyannis Railroad | Following station |
|---|---|---|
| Holbrook toward Braintree | Braintree-Hyannis 1984–1988 | Bridgewater toward Hyannis or Falmouth |
| Preceding station | New York, New Haven and Hartford Railroad | Following station |
| Montello toward Boston | Boston–Middleborough | Campello toward Middleborough |
| Boston Terminus | Boston–Woods Hole | Bridgewater toward Woods Hole |
| Boston Terminus | Boston–Hyannis | Bridgewater toward Hyannis |
| Boston Terminus | Boston–Provincetown | Middleborough toward Provincetown |
Location

Brockton station is an MBTA Commuter Rail station in Brockton, Massachusetts. It serves the MBTA Fall River/New Bedford Line and is a stop on the seasonal CapeFLYER service. The station has a single accessible full-length high-level platform that serves the line's two tracks. It is located adjacent to the BAT Centre, the primary hub for Brockton Area Transit Authority local bus service.

The first station in the town (then called North Bridgewater) opened in 1846 on the Fall River Railroad. It was rebuilt in 1873–74 and renamed Brockton in 1874. The railroad helped Brockton grow into a major manufacturing center. In the 1890s, Brockton was the site of the state's first major grade crossing elimination program, which included the construction of a massive stone viaduct and a pair of station buildings designed by Bradford Gilbert.

Passenger service ended in 1959, and the station was demolished during an urban renewal program in the 1960s. After two decades of planning, the modern station was opened for commuter rail service by the Massachusetts Bay Transportation Authority (MBTA) in 1997. The BAT Centre was opened in 1999.

== History ==
=== Early history ===
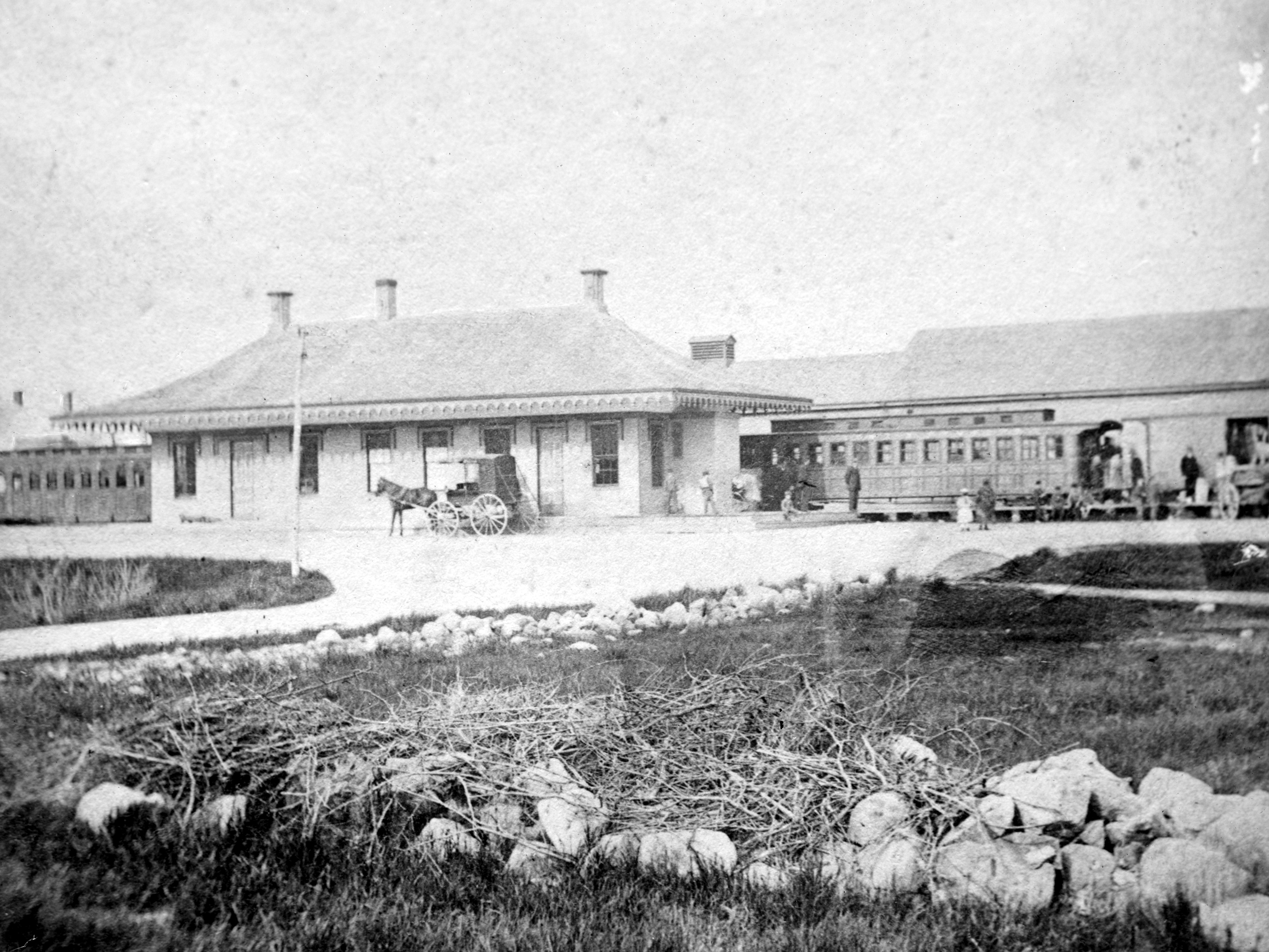
The one-story Brockton station before 1874

The northern section of the Fall River Railroad was extended south from Randolph to North Bridgewater around October 1846. A further extension opened to Middleborough on December 21, 1846, completing the line between South Braintree and Fall River. The first North Bridgewater station was a one-story structure located south of Center Street on the west side of the railroad tracks. (Until 1895, most railroads in southeastern Massachusetts had left-hand running, with Boston-bound trains on the western track).

Unusually among larger cities in Massachusetts, Brockton was never a railroad junction; east-west branches were built from Bridgewater proper before North Bridgewater became a major manufacturing area. A charter for a branch from Stoughton to North Bridgewater was applied for in 1845 – before the railroad had even been completed – but nothing became of the plan. The Fall River Railroad merged into the Old Colony and Fall River Railroad in 1854. Commuting from North Bridgewater to Boston on the railroad was possible after 1854, and North Bridgewater was the outer terminus of some trains in the late 1850s and early 1860s.

The railroad became the Old Colony and Newport Railroad in 1863, and finally the Old Colony Railroad in 1872. A new Victorian-style station was built in 1873–74 at Church Street on the west side of the tracks. The town was renamed Brockton in 1874, with the railroad station changing its name on May 7. The railroad was a key part of the town's burgeoning shoe industry and rapid growth, which caused Brockton's population to double from 1877 to 1887. A new freight house was built in 1881.

=== Grade crossing elimination ===
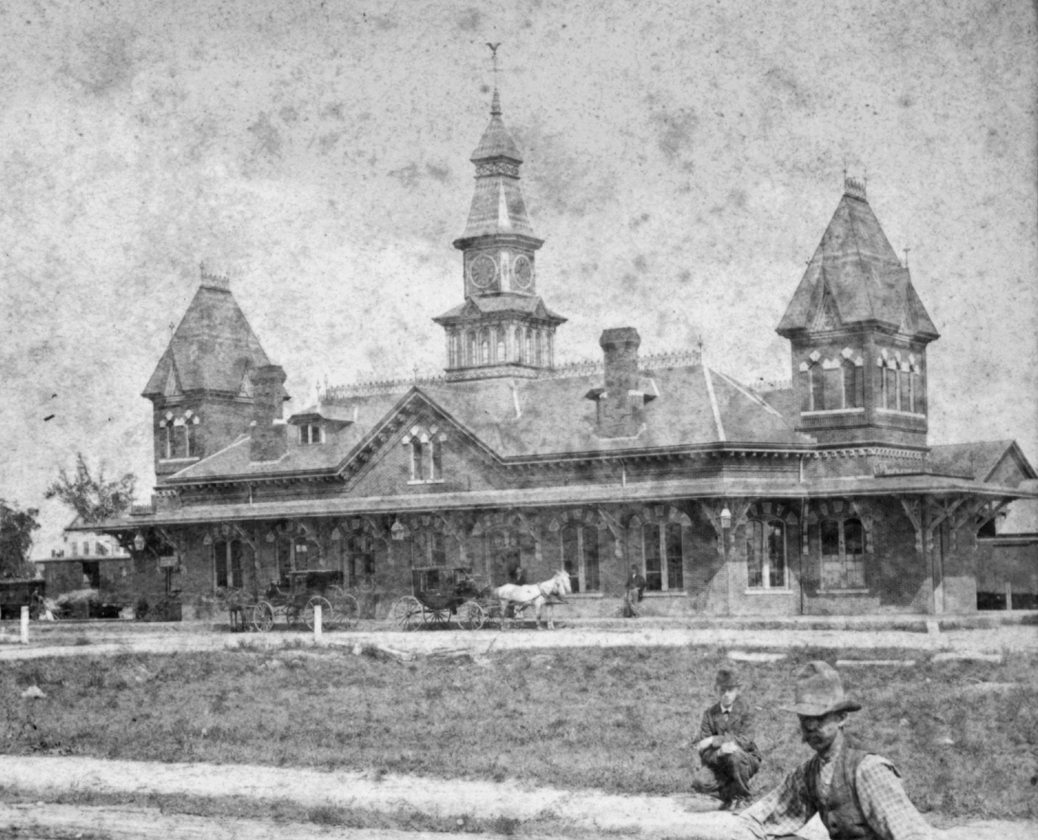
The Victorian-style Brockton station before it was replaced in the 1890s

On June 21, 1890, the Massachusetts General Court passed An Act to Promote the Abolition of Grade Crossings, which allowed town officials or a railroad company to petition the state superior court to create an independent commission to determine whether a grade crossing could and should be eliminated. The costs of such eliminations were to be paid 65% by the railroad, not more than 10% by the town, and the remainder by the state.

The small local cost provided towns incentive to petition for crossing eliminations to prevent public thoroughfares from being blocked by trains. Numerous municipalities soon agitated for crossing eliminations, with Brockton's April 1891 petition the first of the lot. Shortly before then, the Old Colony Railroad announced plans to replace the aging and undersized Brockton station with a more appropriate structure. The station design was well-received, but its at-grade design – which would have precluded crossing eliminations – was seen as a threat to the economic future of the city. Brockton then had no fire station east of the railroad, adding fire safety concerns to the more widespread issue of pedestrian safety. Frequent delays for fire engines responding to calls caused higher insurance rates and lower land values in the eastern part of the city.

The 1890 law had only authorized municipalities to eliminate crossings with public roads; however, many crossings in Brockton were private roads that the city did not have the right to modify. On June 15, 1892, the General Court authorized Brockton to include private roads in its grade separation project.

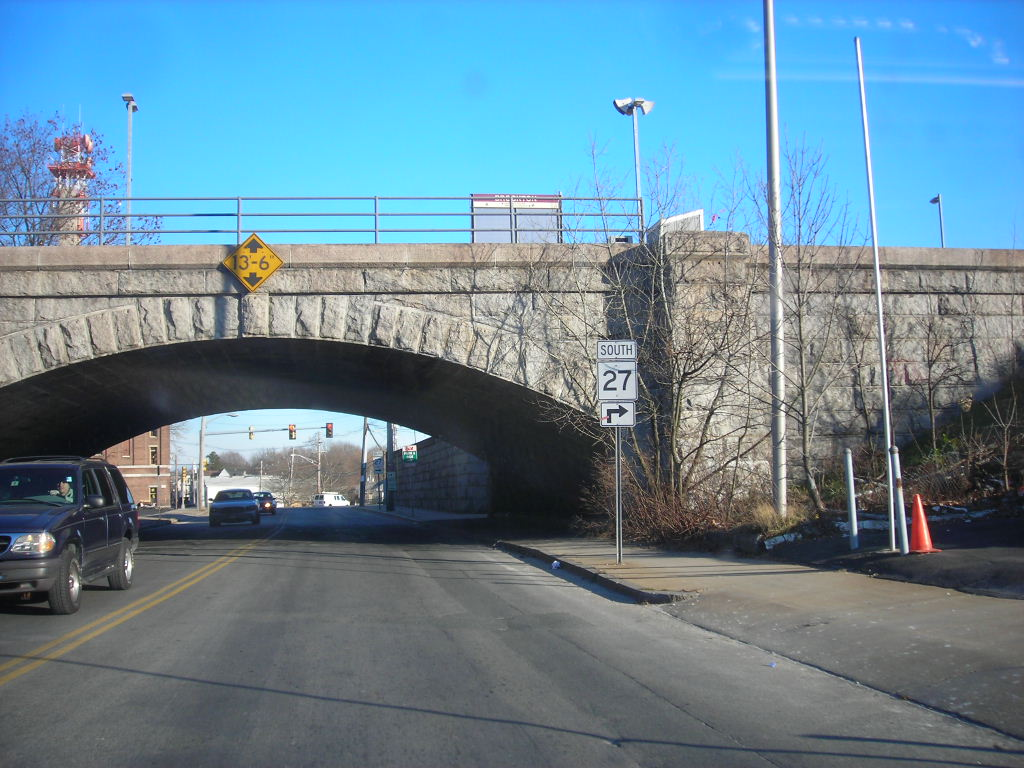
The bridge over Court Street, one of five massive stone arch bridges built during the grade crossing elimination project

As the petition to consider elimination of all grade crossings in the city was under way, city engineer F. Herbert Snow prepared a preliminary plan. The proposal called for tracks to be raised and streets lowered through the city center, and the tracks lowered and streets raised in the Campello village to the south. Brockton station and Montello station to the north would be completely replaced and relocated, while Campello station would be replaced on its existing site. The railroad was initially opposed to the expense of the plan; however, city engineers made a convincing case that grade separation would only be more expensive in the future, and the two parties reached an agreement in June 1893. The New Haven Railroad leased the Old Colony Railroad in 1893 and continued with the project. The Massachusetts Board of Railroad Commissioners approved the grade separation project on April 21, 1894, allowing construction to proceed.

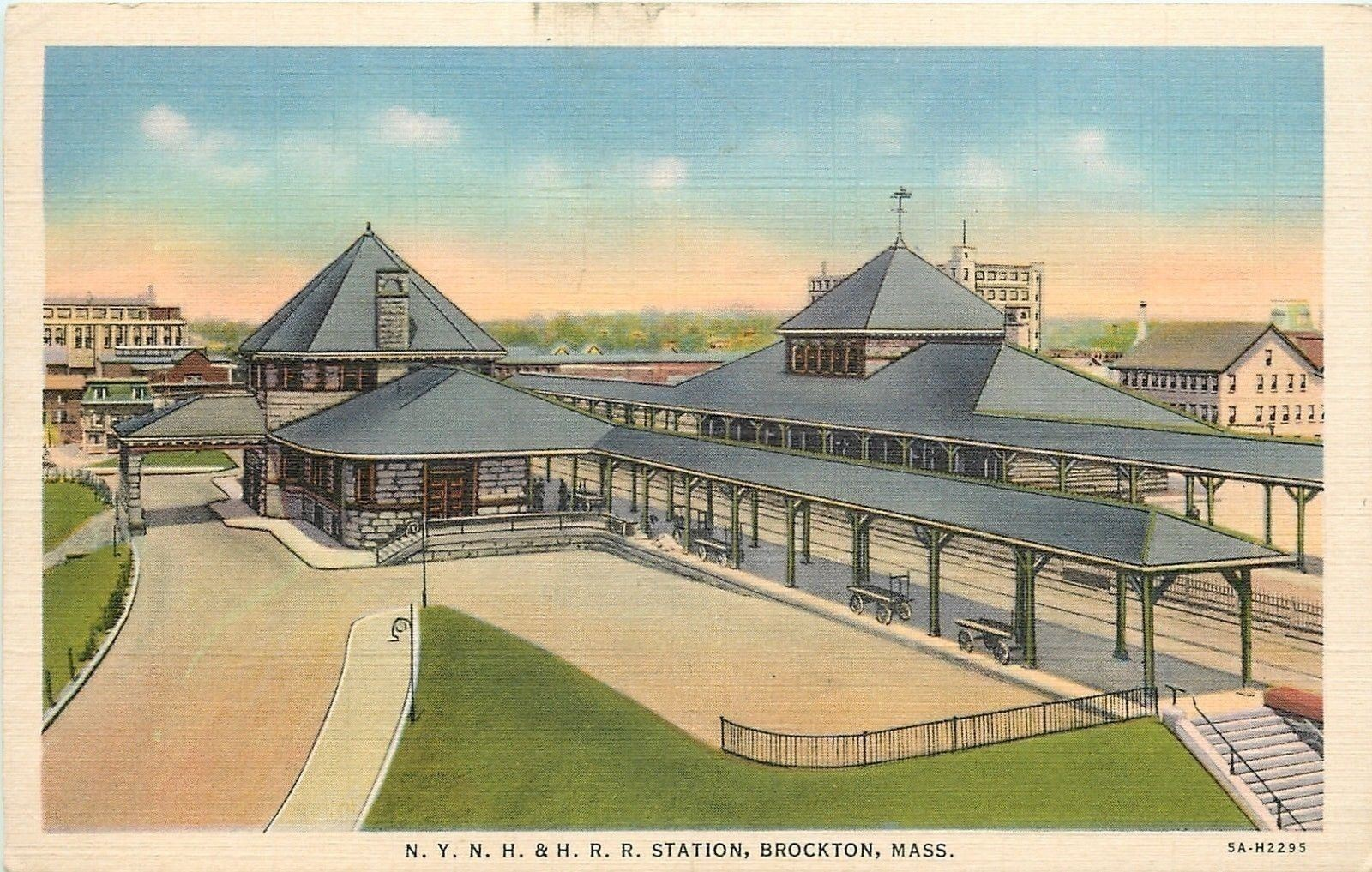
A later postcard view of the new stations

Snow oversaw the design and construction of the project until its completion. The final quadruple-tracked stone viaduct was 0.7 miles (1.1 km) long, with stone arch bridges spanning five downtown streets; seven new bridges over the railroad were built near Montello and Campello. A total of 9,000 feet (2,700 m) of track was raised up to 15 feet (4.6 m); an additional 5,100 feet (1,600 m) was lowered up to 12 feet (3.7 m). A pair of stone passenger stations were constructed north of Centre Street in Brockton, with a pedestrian tunnel connecting the two buildings. A smaller station pair was built at Campello, and a shelter was added at Montello. The stations were designed by Bradford Gilbert, who had previously designed a number of other Old Colony stations including those still standing at Bridgewater, Canton Junction, and North Abington.

The pair of Brockton stations was built of Milford pink granite with brown trim and slate roofs in the Richardsonian Romanesque style then common for railroad stations in the area. The main station was 33 by 140 feet (10 m × 43 m), with the secondary station 30 by 108 feet (9.1 m × 32.9 m). A platform next to each building served the outer tracks, while the inner pair of tracks was fenced off to allow express trains to safely pass at speed. The western two tracks and station were constructed first, allowing service to continue without interruption on existing tracks until that half of the modified tracks were completed. A massive new freight yard was constructed just north of downtown Brockton; smaller yards were built at Montello and Campello to handle local freight.

The grade separation and station construction were completed by early 1897. The finished project, with its stone stations and bridges, was well-received; a number of other cities modeled their grade separation efforts on Brockton's success. However, the work cost $2,236,411 (equivalent to $86,550,000 in 2025), of which the railroad paid the majority. Despite the operational benefits, railroads thereafter became much more wary of large grade separation projects:

Brockton ought to be more than satisfied, for no other city will get so complete a work in abolishing grade crossings. A prominent official of the railroad recently told me that the railroad company made a mistake in being induced to expend $2,000,000 in a little city like Brockton, to abolish crossings. He said that the railroad company would never again be induced to engage in such an elaborate expenditure in a like undertaking.

=== Closure and revival ===
Passenger rail service around Boston began declining in the 1920s, starting with branch lines. By 1954, Brockton was served by 13 daily round trips, for six of which it was the outer terminus. Only two of the four tracks remained at the station. After the completion of the parallel Southeast Expressway, remaining passenger service on the Old Colony Division was ended by the New Haven Railroad on June 30, 1959. The bridge over the Neponset River was destroyed by fire in 1960; the need for a replacement bridge drastically increased the cost of restoring passenger service. The Massachusetts Bay Transportation Authority (MBTA) was founded in 1964 to subsidize suburban commuter rail service; the agency restored service on several other lines, but southeastern Massachusetts remained without passenger service. The line continued to be used for freight service by the New Haven and its successors Penn Central and Conrail. The station buildings were torn down in the late 1960s during an urban renewal project. A new police station, which lacked the grandeur of both the former railroad buildings and the former police station, was constructed on the eastern site in 1967. It was built atop the retaining walls of the former station; the walls and several stone stairwells to the street remain intact.

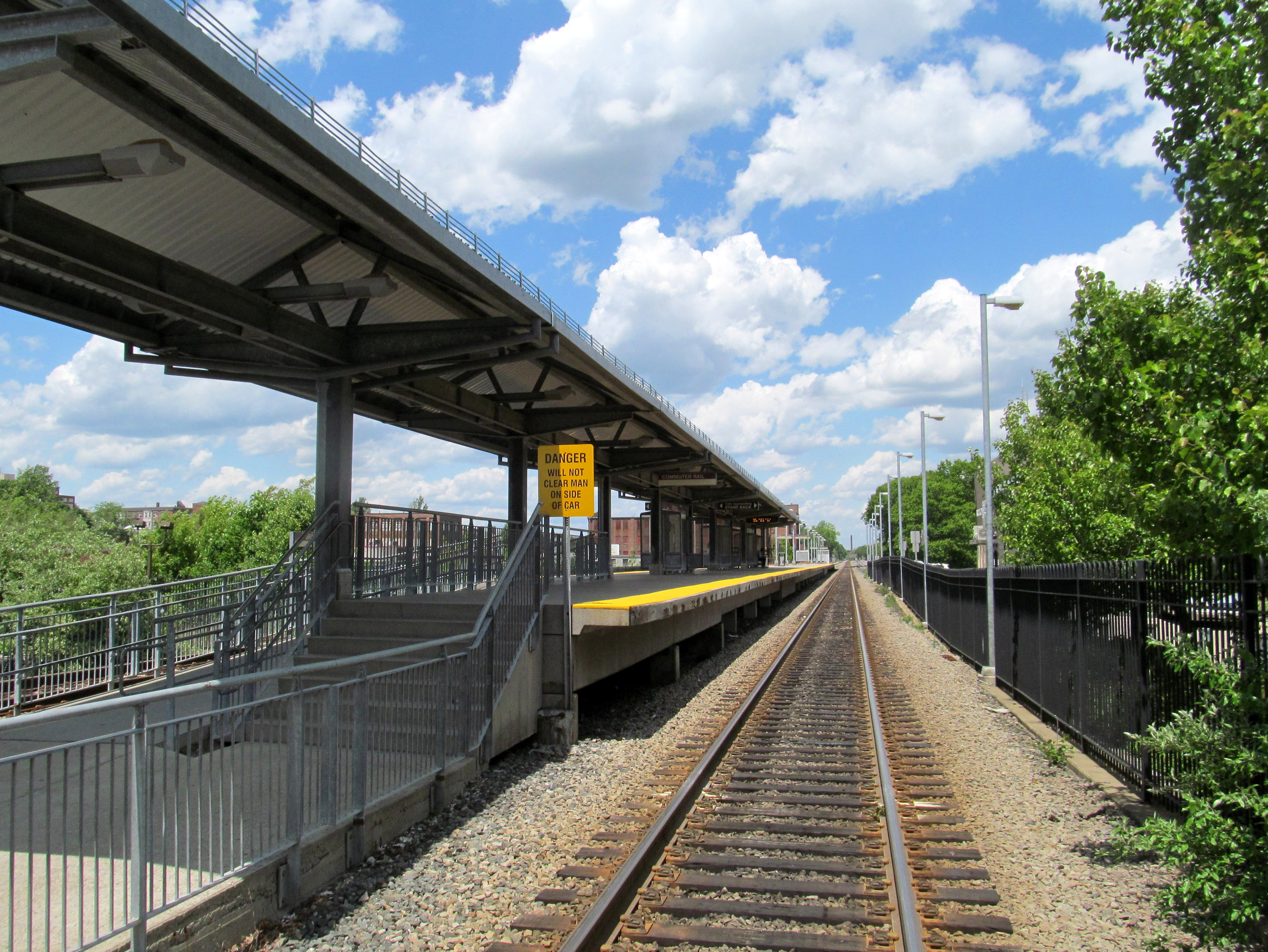
The modern station has a full-length high-level accessible platform.

In the 1970s, calls began to restore service on the former Old Colony Division. On January 27, 1973, the MBTA purchased most of Penn Central's commuter rail rights-of-way in southeastern Massachusetts, including the Middleborough main line from Braintree to Campello. A 1974 state analysis of restoring commuter rail service indicated that the Brockton platforms were still extant, but would need refurbishing for use. From 1984 to 1988, Cape Cod and Hyannis Railroad seasonal commuter and excursion service stopped in Brockton at the former station site.

In 1984, a state-directed MBTA study found that restoration of commuter rail service would be feasible. A Draft Environmental Impact Statement (DEIS) was released in May 1990, followed by a Final Environmental Impact Statement (FEIS) in 1992. Both the DEIS and FEIS included conceptual plans placing Brockton station between Crescent Street and Lawrence Street, south of the former location and just outside the downtown core. However, the station was instead constructed at the previous site, accessed behind the police station. The accessible full-length island platform occupies the former inner track spaces, with the line's two current tracks location where the outer tracks originally were. The Middleborough/Lakeville Line and Plymouth/Kingston Line opened for commuter service on September 29, 1997.

On February 15, 1999, the Brockton Intermodal Centre (BAT Centre) opened one block away as a terminal for Brockton Area Transit Authority local bus service. The $4 million bus station was designed to imitate the architecture of the former railroad station. The project also included a 250-space surface parking lot. In December 2001, the state congressional delegation secured $1 million to support construction of a parking garage at the bus terminal. The garage opened on April 30, 2004.

The seasonal weekend CapeFLYER service to Cape Cod began stopping at Brockton in 2015.
