= Montello station =

Railway station in Brockton, MA

Montello
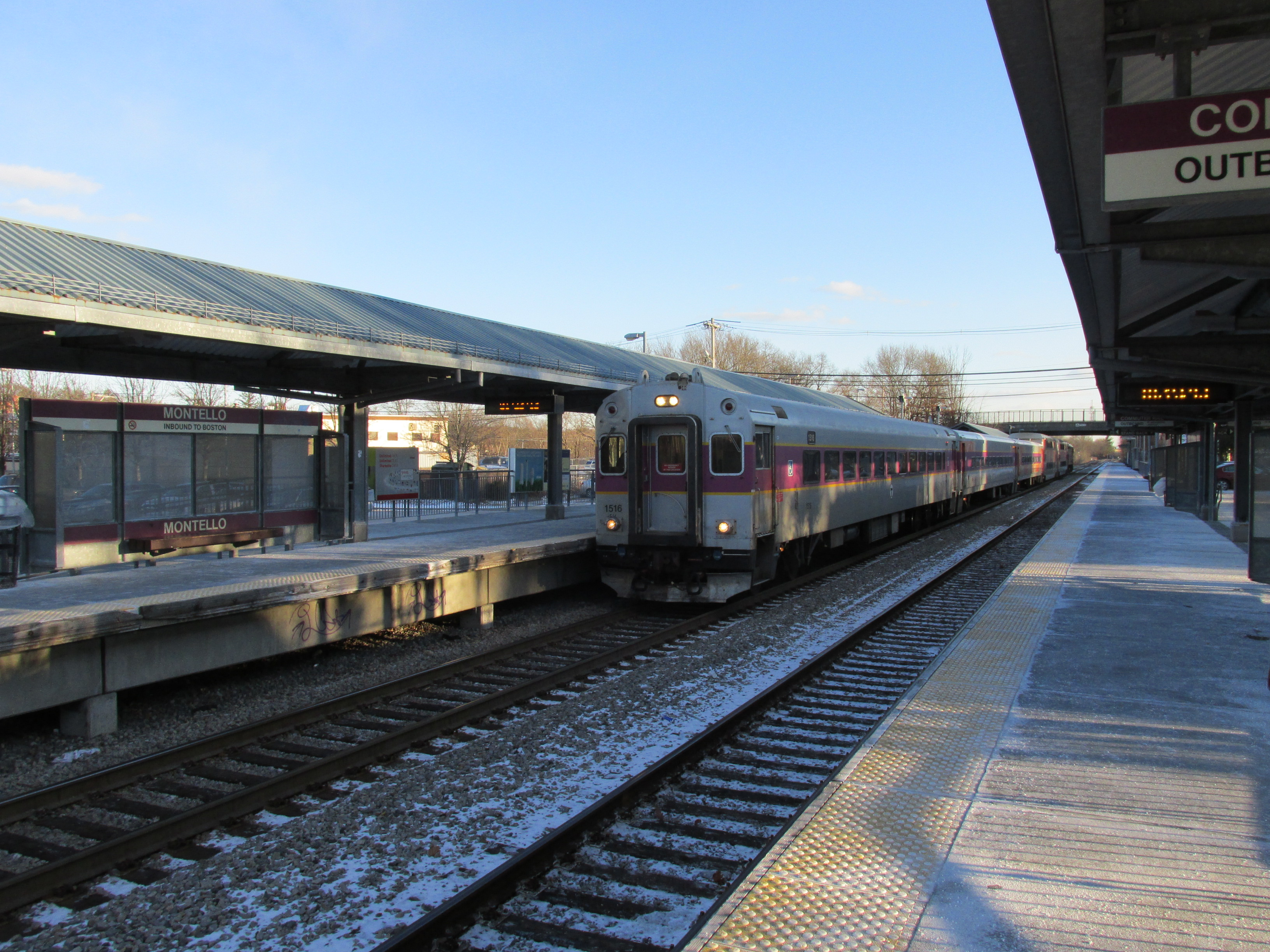
- An inbound train arriving at Montello station in 2013

General information
- Location: 150 Spark Street; Brockton, Massachusetts
- Coordinates: 42.10636°N 71.02188°W
- Line: Middleborough Main Line
- Platforms: 2 side platforms
- Tracks: 2
- Connections: MBTA bus: 230; BAT: 10/11

Construction
- Parking: 425 spaces ($4.00 fee)
- Cycle facilities: 16 spaces
- Accessible: Yes

Other information
- Fare zone: 4

History
- Opened: September 29, 1997
- Closed: June 30, 1959 (former station)

Passengers
- 2024: 467 daily boardings

Services
Preceding station	MBTA	Following station
Holbrook/Randolph toward South Station	Fall River/New Bedford Line	Brockton toward Fall River or New Bedford
Former services
Preceding station	New York, New Haven and Hartford Railroad	Following station
Avon toward Boston	Boston–Middleborough	Brockton toward Middleborough
Location

Montello station is an MBTA Commuter Rail station in Brockton, Massachusetts. It serves the Fall River/New Bedford Line. Located north of downtown Brockton, it has two full-length high-level platforms serving the line's two tracks, and is fully accessible.

== History ==
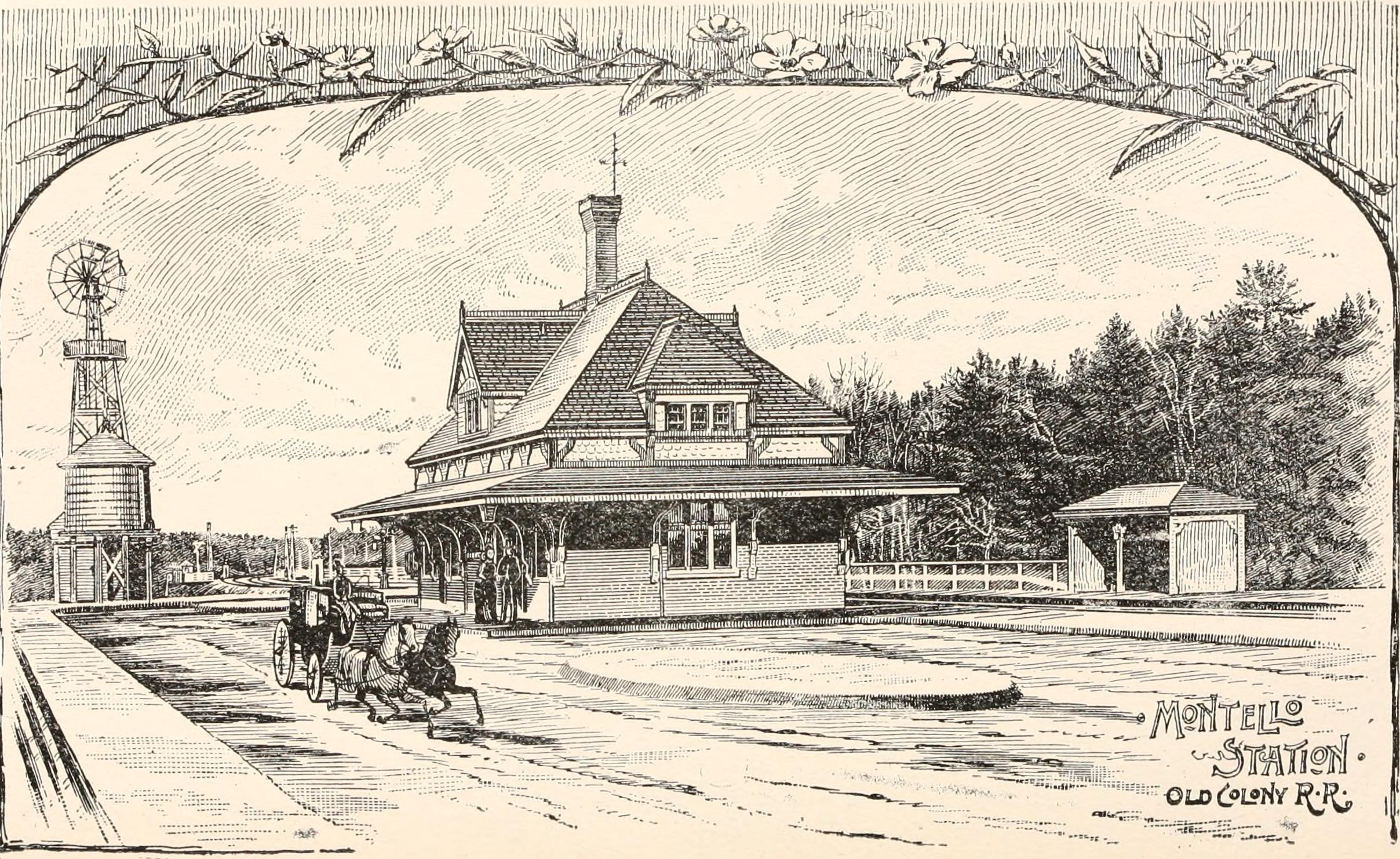
1890 illustration of Montello station

The Fall River Railroad opened through North Bridgewater (later Brockton) in 1846. It merged in 1854 into the Old Colony and Fall River Railroad, which became the Old Colony Railroad after several name changes.

By 1884, residents and shoe manufacturers in the Huntington Heights area of northern Brockton desired a station. After failing to reach an agreement with an abutting property owner, the railroad took the needed land by eminent domain in April 1884. Construction of Huntington Heights station and freight house began that June. The brick station building was on the west side of the tracks, with the freight house on the east side. The station opened later in 1884.

Residents immediately desired to change the name of the station. Their first choice was "Newburg", but the second choice of "Montello" was chosen instead. The name change took effect on January 15, 1885. A new freight house was built in 1886.

The New York, New Haven and Hartford Railroad acquired the Old Colony in 1893. A new passenger shelter designed by Bradford Gilbert and a new freight house were built at Montello around 1896 during the elimination of grade crossings in Brockton.

Montello station closed on June 30, 1959, when all remaining Old Colony Division service ended. A new station opened on September 29, 1997, along with the rest of the Middleborough/Lakeville Line.
