= Holbrook/Randolph station =

Train station in Randolph, Massachusetts, US

Holbrook/Randolph
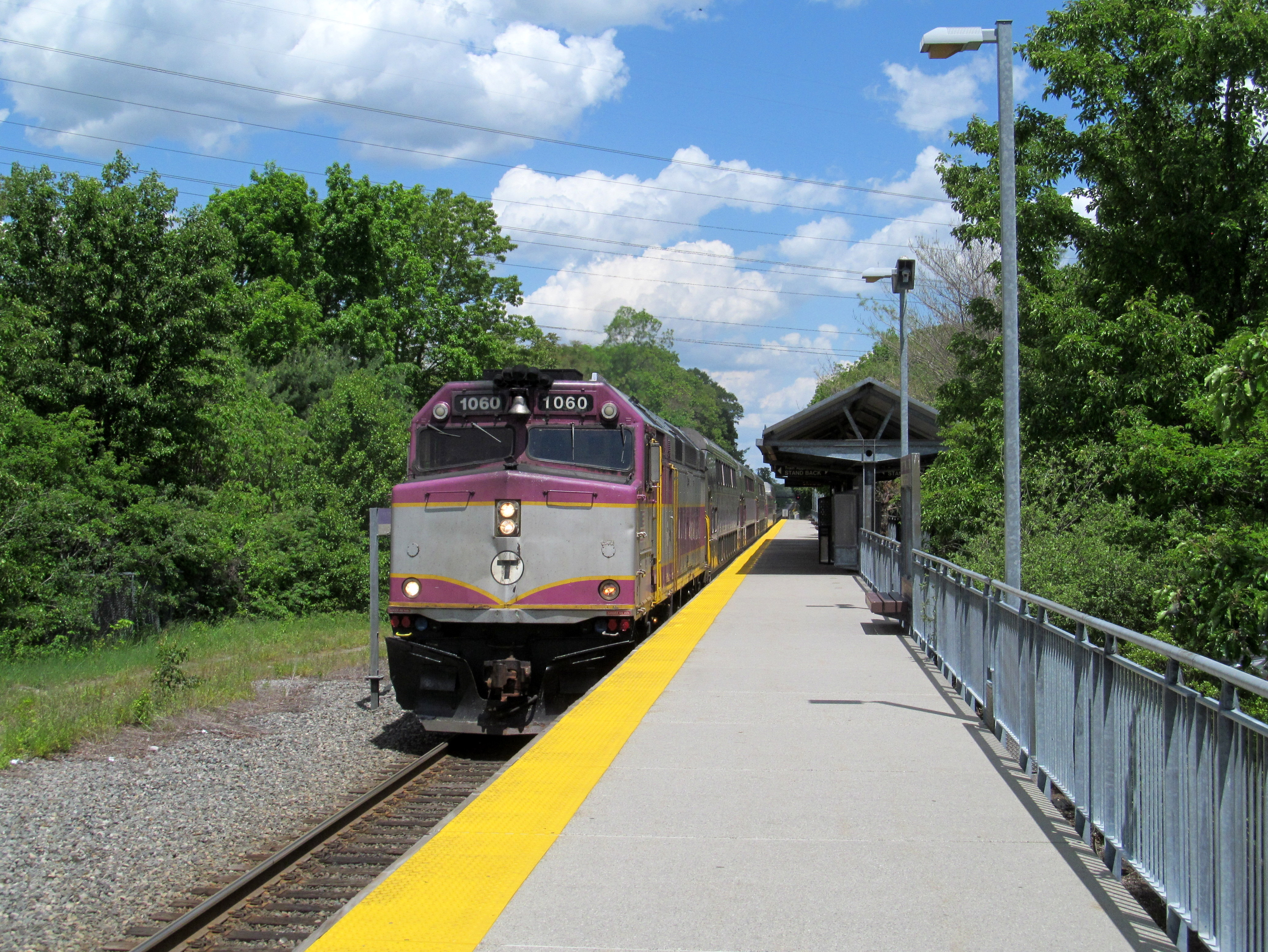
- An outbound train at Holbrook/Randolph station in June 2017

General information
- Location: Union Street and Center Street; Randolph, Massachusetts
- Coordinates: 42.15731°N 71.02696°W
- Line: Middleborough Main Line
- Platforms: 1 side platform
- Tracks: 1
- Connections: MBTA bus: 238, 240

Construction
- Parking: 369 spaces ($4.00 daily)
- Cycle facilities: 8 spaces
- Accessible: Yes

Other information
- Fare zone: 3

History
- Opened: September 29, 1997
- Former names: Holbrook

Passengers
- 2024: 406 daily boardings

Services
Preceding station	MBTA	Following station
Braintree toward South Station	Fall River/New Bedford Line	Montello toward Fall River or New Bedford
Former services
Preceding station	Cape Cod and Hyannis Railroad	Following station
Braintree Terminus	Braintree-Hyannis 1984–1988	Brockton toward Hyannis or Falmouth
Preceding station	New York, New Haven and Hartford Railroad	Following station
Braintree Highlands toward Boston	Boston–Middleborough Service ended 1959	Avon toward Middleborough
Location

Holbrook/Randolph station (also signed as Randolph/Holbrook) is an MBTA Commuter Rail station on the border of Holbrook and Randolph, Massachusetts. It is served by the Fall River/New Bedford Line.

== History ==
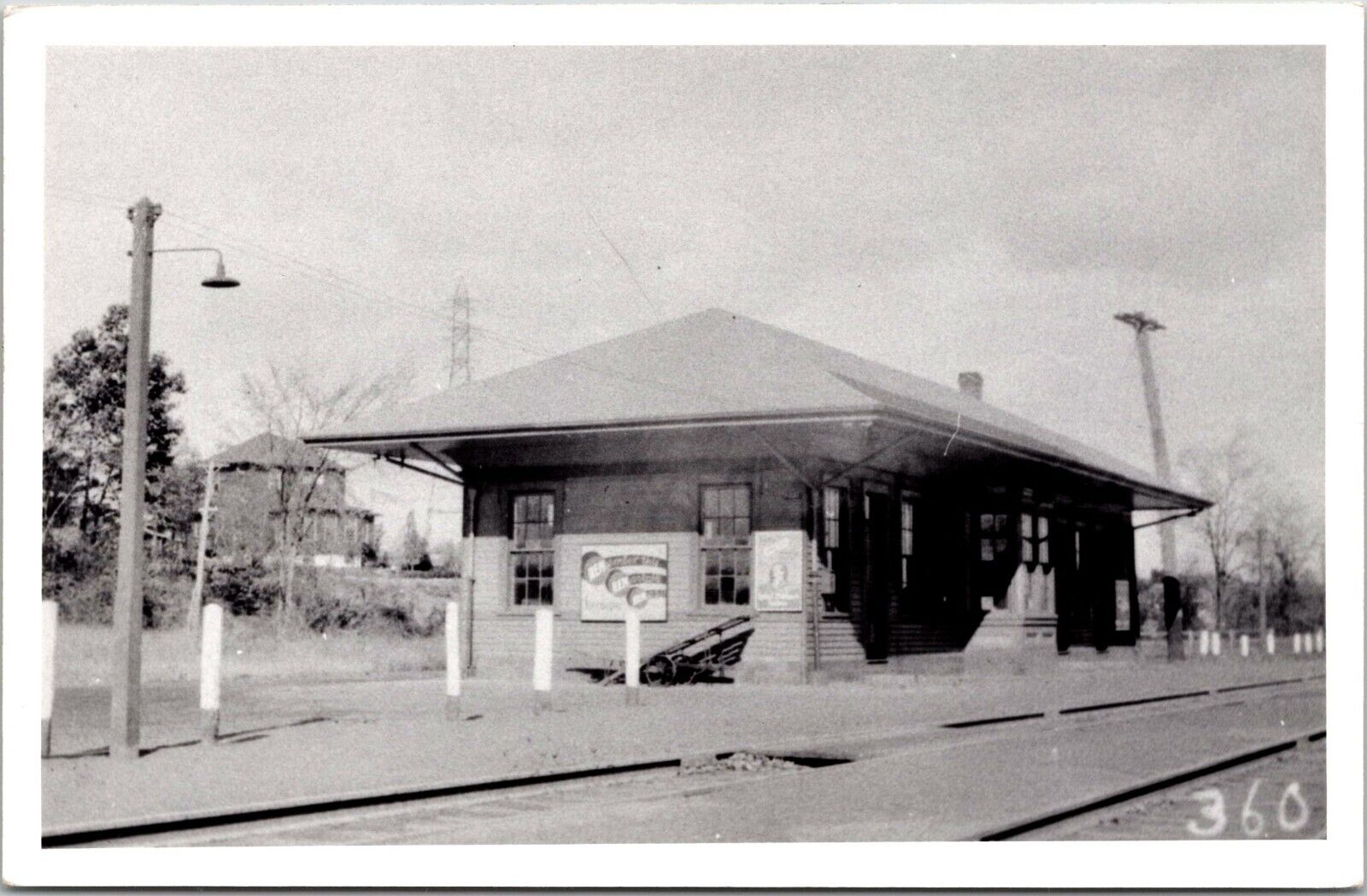
Postcard view of Holbrook station

The Fall River Railroad opened in phases in 1845–46. The section between Braintree and Randolph opened on August 28, 1846; it was extended to North Bridgewater by October, with through service to Fall River beginning in December 1846. Randolph station was located between the villages of Randolph Centre and East Randolph.

After the 1866 opening of the Dighton and Somerset Railroad, which passed directly through Randolph Centre with a station there, the existing Randolph station was renamed East Randolph. On February 29, 1872, East Randolph separated from Randolph to become Holbrook. The station was renamed Holbrook in March. A new freight house was built in 1883.

Holbrook station closed on June 30, 1959, when all remaining Old Colony Division service was discontinued. From 1984 to 1988, the Cape Cod & Hyannis Railroad stopped near the current station site. Holbrook/Randolph station opened in September 1997.
