= Montella (disambiguation) =

Montella is an Italian town and municipality in the province of Avellino, Campania.

Montella may also refer to:

== Places ==
- Montellà i Martinet, Spanish municipality in Cerdanya, Catalonia

== People ==
- Montella (surname), people with the surname Montella

== Insects ==
- Argyresthia montella, moth species of the family Yponomeutidae
- Glyphipterix montella, moth species of the family Glyphipterigidae
- Montella (weevil), a beetle genus in the tribe Apostasimerini

== See also ==
- Montello (disambiguation)
