= Montiglio (surname) =

Montiglio is an Italian surname. Notable people with the surname include:

- César Montiglio (born 1984), Argentine footballer
- Dominick Montiglio (1947 – 2021), American former associate of the Gambino crime family
- Víctor Montiglio (1944−2011), Chilean lawyer who served as president of the Supreme Court of Chile

== See also ==
- Montiglio (disambiguation)
