= LendInvest =

Online lending platform

- Type: Public
- Traded as: AIM: LINV
- Industry: Fintech
- Founded: 2013; 13 years ago spun out of Montello
- Headquarters: London, United Kingdom
- Key people: Rod Lockhart, CEO; Christian Faes, Executive Chairman & Co-founder; Ian Thomas, CIO & Co-founder
- Products: Residential and commercial mortgages Investment platform
- Services: Financial services
- Website: lendinvest.com

LendInvest is a British non-bank mortgage lender which provides a property lending and investing platform. As an alternative fintech lender in the property market, LendInvest provides finance to property professionals and small and medium-sized businesses (SMEs) around the UK. It also makes it possible for individuals, corporates and institutions to invest in secured property loans originated and underwritten by its mortgage team.

LendInvest operates throughout the UK with staff based regionally covering Southern England, Northern England and Scotland. LendInvest is a leading FinTech companies in the UK.

LendInvest was launched in 2013 when it was spun out of Montello, a London-based specialist short-term property finance lender. LendInvest is a publicly listed company and is backed by Atomico, the European venture capital investment fund co-founded by Niklas Zennström, which invested £17 million in the company in March 2016.

== History ==
Since 2015, LendInvest has published an independently audited Annual Report on its website. In the year to 31 March 2017, LendInvest reported 20% revenue growth to £40 million and an underlying profit from operations of £2.6 million.

In February 2017, LendInvest published a report entitled "Starting small to build more homes: A blueprint for better policymaking in the property SME market", that revealed that SMEs in the housebuilding sector have been failing at alarming rates, and argues that the government could help to resolve the country's chronic housing shortage by rebooting its strategy to help smaller property firms. The report was formally launched on 21 March 2017 by Conor Burns MP.

In June 2017, LendInvest received a third SQ1 Servicer Quality Rating from European ratings agency ARC Ratings. ARC Rating assesses the process used by LendInvest to originate, underwrite and service property loans.

In September 2016, LendInvest launched the LendInvest Property Development Academy, a non-profit two day course for aspiring property entrepreneurs to learn how to better equip themselves with the skills they need to grow their property development portfolios. Academy courses are held in London, Manchester, Edinburgh, Bristol and Birmingham. The Academy was launched in collaboration with the University of Reading and is supported by the Home Builders' Federation. The initiative was attended by the Scottish government in June 2017 when Minister for Housing Kevin Stewart MSP launched the Edinburgh course.

In November 2017, LendInvest launched into the UK Buy-to-Let market and in June 2019 became the first Fintech to securitise its own assets in a £259 million securitisation of Buy-to-Let loans.

LendInvest became a public company in July 2021, listing on the London Stock Exchange's AIM.

== Products ==
LendInvest provides short-term financing options, and Buy-to-Let mortgages for UK-based property investors.

On 10 August 2017, LendInvest launched a listed retail bond on the London Stock Exchange. The process to raise LendInvest's first retail bond was closed early and oversubscribed. The retail bond is the first to be issued by a FinTech business and constitutes a fourth funding channel for the company. LendInvest's first retail bond was added by the Daily Telegraph's Questor share tip column to its £500,000 Income Portfolio on 4 August 2017.
