= Montello (surname) =

Montello is an Italian surname from Friuli, originally referring to someone from Montello, Veneto. Notable people with the name include:

- Daniel R. Montello (born 1959), American geographer and academic
- Giuseppe Montello (born 1992), Italian biathlete
- Josué Montello (1917–2006), Brazilian writer and diplomat
- Merci Montello (born 1950), American model and actress

== See also ==
- Montella (surname)
