= Montella (surname) =

Montella is an Italian surname from Naples and Salerno, originally referring to someone from the town of Montella. Notable people with the name include:

- Antonio Montella (born 1986), Italian football player
- Roberto Montella (born 1969), Italian diplomat, Secretary General of the OSCE Parliamentary Assembly
- Vincenzo Montella (born 1974), Italian football player and coach
- Yari Montella (born 2000), Italian motorcycle racer

== See also ==
- Montello (surname)
