= Montello Bridging Finance =

British specialist real estate financier

- Type: Private company
- Industry: Financial services
- Founded: 2008; 18 years ago
- Founder: Christian Faes and Ian Thomas
- Defunct: 2013
- Fate: Spun off
- Successor: LendInvest
- Headquarters: London, United Kingdom
- Area served: United Kingdom
- Products: Mortgages
- Website: www.montellofinance.com

Montello Bridging Finance was a British specialist real estate financier based in London, run by parent company Montello Capital Partners, which was also the asset manager for the Montello Income Fund, the Montello Development Finance Fund and the Montello Real Estate Opportunity Fund.

The Montello Income Fund was a real estate bridging finance fund that is focused on lending against the residential property market in the United Kingdom (specifically in London).

It would transform into fintech lender LendInvest in 2013.

== History ==
The Montello Development Finance Fund was a specialist development finance lending vehicle, which focusses on lending to residential developers in London.

Montello Bridging Finance funded its transactions through its own suite of funds (the Montello Income Fund and the Montello Development Finance Fund) and bank funding lines. The Montello Income Fund is set up as a UK dual exempt unit trust and limited partnership that was open to individual investors, offshore bonds, and Self-invested personal pension (SIPP) investors. The Fund lent directly to end borrowers in the UK, and took first charge security interest for all of its loans in the name of the Fund.

As a bridge financing specialist, Montello provided short-term funding solutions for borrowers. Examples of where Montello provides bridging finance includes auction purchases, for corporate cash-flow issues, to complete under-market value purchases, or other instances where fast settlements are required.

In 2013, it spun off the business to LendInvest which became a fintech lending company. At that time Montello Capital Management had over a quarter of a billion dollars under management.
