= Brockton Area Transit Authority =

Public organization providing public transportation

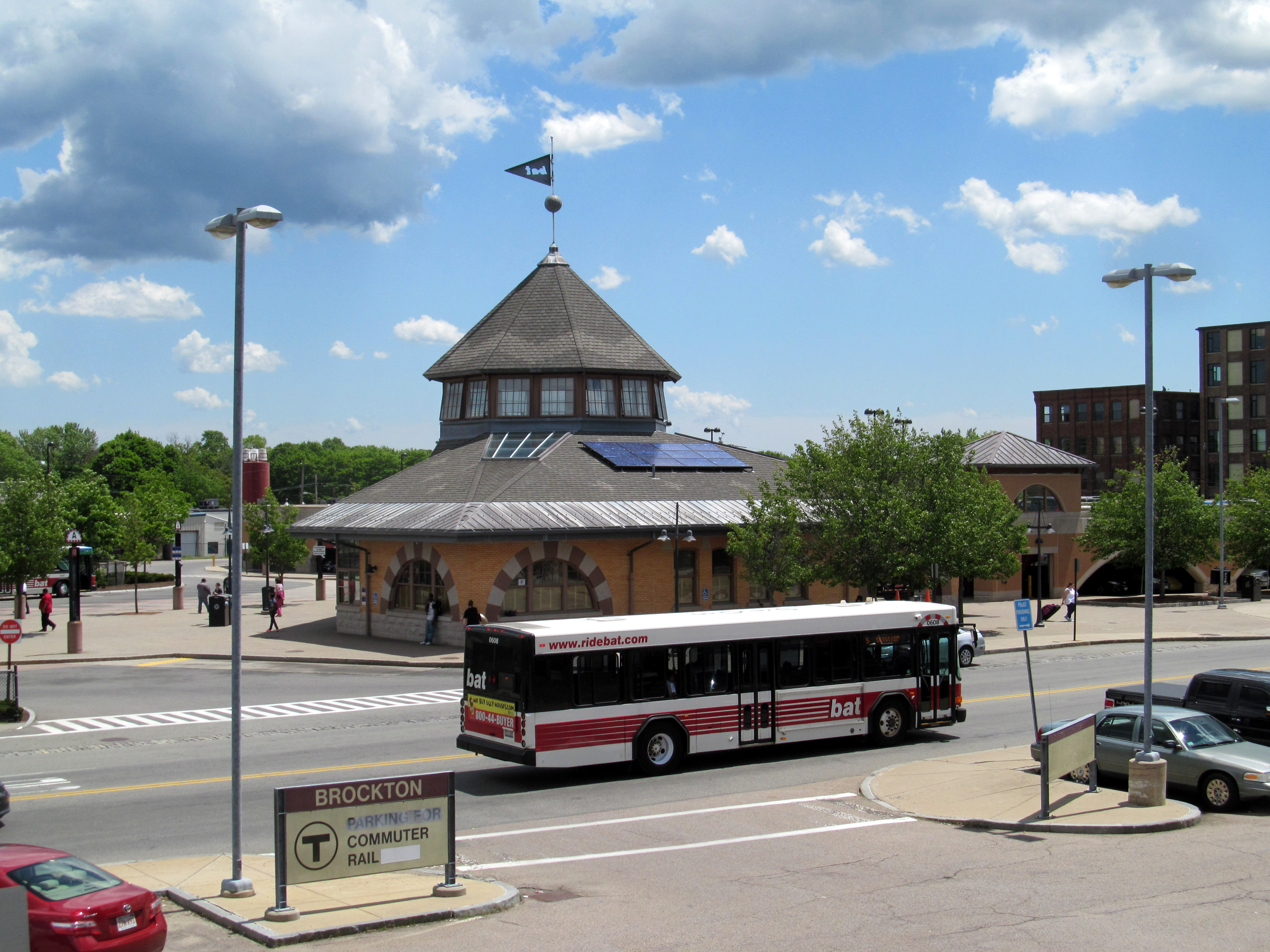
- A BAT bus passing by the BAT Centre in Brockton in 2017
- Formerly: Union Street Railway
- Founded: 1974
- Headquarters: 155 Court Street
- Locale: Brockton, MA
- Service type: bus service, paratransit
- Routes: 14
- Hubs: 10 Commercial St.
- Stations: Ashmont Station
- Lounge: 10 Commercial St.
- Daily ridership: 2,553,455 (2024 Boardings)
- Operator: East Coast Transit Services
- Administrator: Michael Lambert
- Website: ridebat.com

Brockton Area Transit Authority, branded as Brockton Area Transit (BAT), is a public, non-profit organization in Massachusetts, charged with providing public transportation to the Brockton area, consisting of the city of Brockton and the adjoining towns of Abington, Avon, East Bridgewater, Easton, Milton, Randolph, Rockland, Stoughton & West Bridgewater.

BAT provides fixed route bus services and paratransit services within its area. The primary interchange is the BAT Centre, located adjacent to Brockton station.

As of 2018, BAT operated a fleet of 41 Gillig Low Floor buses, 19 Ford Elkhart Coach buses, and 40 minibuses of two types.

All BAT transit buses accept cash payment or allow fare to be paid via CharlieCard.

In 2024 the system revived a total of 2,553,455 passenger boardings.

== History ==
Brockton bus service was previously operated by Union Street Railway, until a protracted labor strike prompted the city to buy the routes and buses in September 1973. One year later, this system was reorganized as BAT to secure state funding, and encourage regional participation.

== Routes ==
Many routes leaving the BAT Centre in Brockton are scheduled on a pulse system - meeting at the central hub simultaneously - to provide easy transfers.

Twelve routes primarily serve Brockton & nearby towns :

- 1: Montello Street Via North Main Street
- 2: S. Plaza/Campello Via Main Street
- 3: VA Hospital Via Belmont
- 4: Westgate Via Pleasant
- 4A: Westgate Mall Via N. Warren
- 5: Brockton Hospital Via Centre St.
- 6: Massasoit Via Crescent St.
- 8: Southfield Via Warren & Plan St.
- 9: Pearl Via W. Elm & Torrey
- 10: Lisa & Howard Via N. Quincy & Court
- 11: Cary Hill and the Village
- 13: Mini Maller

Four longer routes run to other towns:

- 12: Ashmont
- 14: Stoughton/Cobbs Corner
- RF: Rockland Flex

Five routes - four on-campus shuttles, and route 28 to the BAT Centre - serve Bridgewater State University.

BAT also offers door-to-door para-transit service called Dial-a-BAT.

== Gallery ==
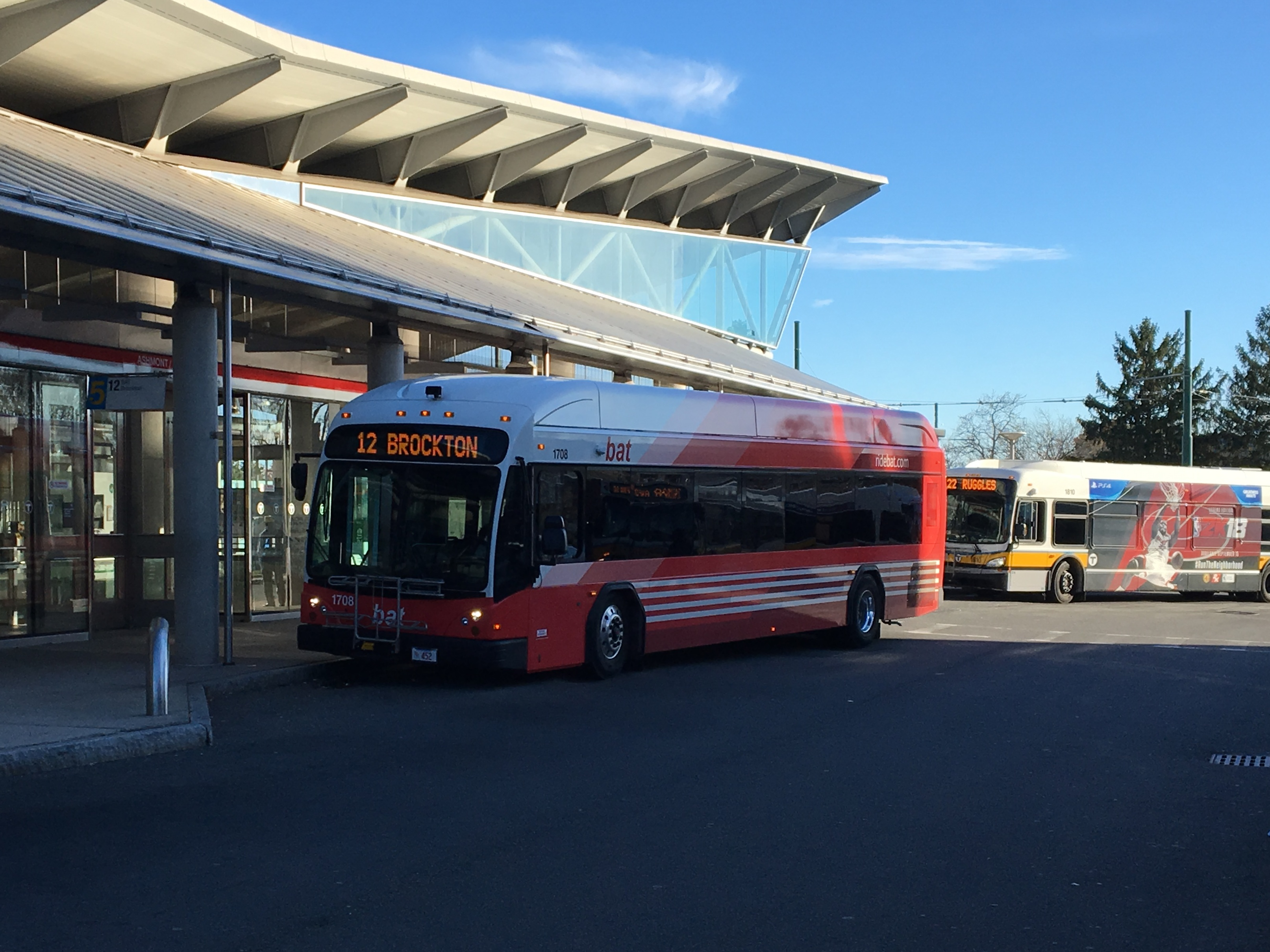
A BAT route 12 bus at Ashmont station in 2017

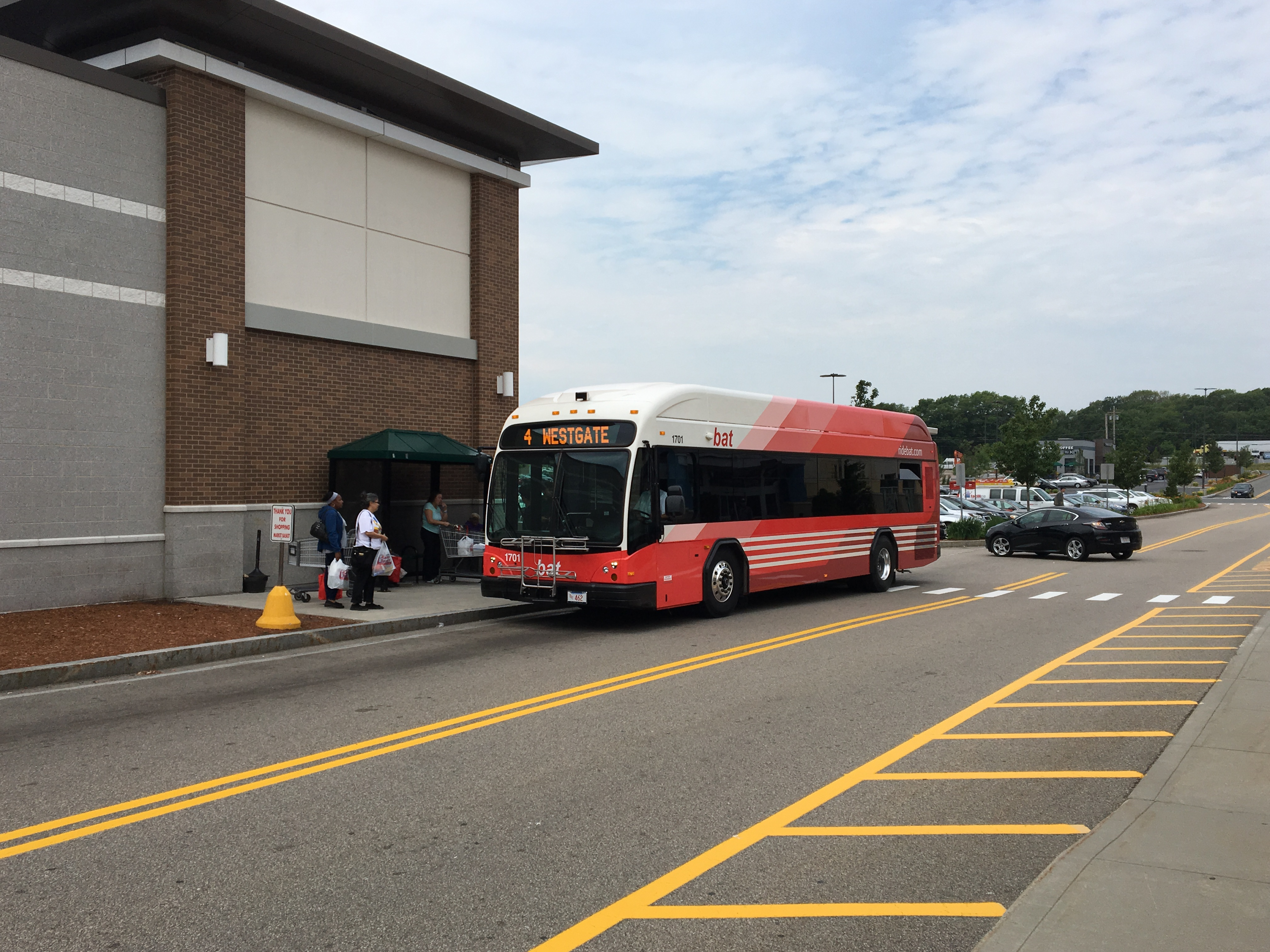
A BAT route 4 bus at Westgate Mall in 2017

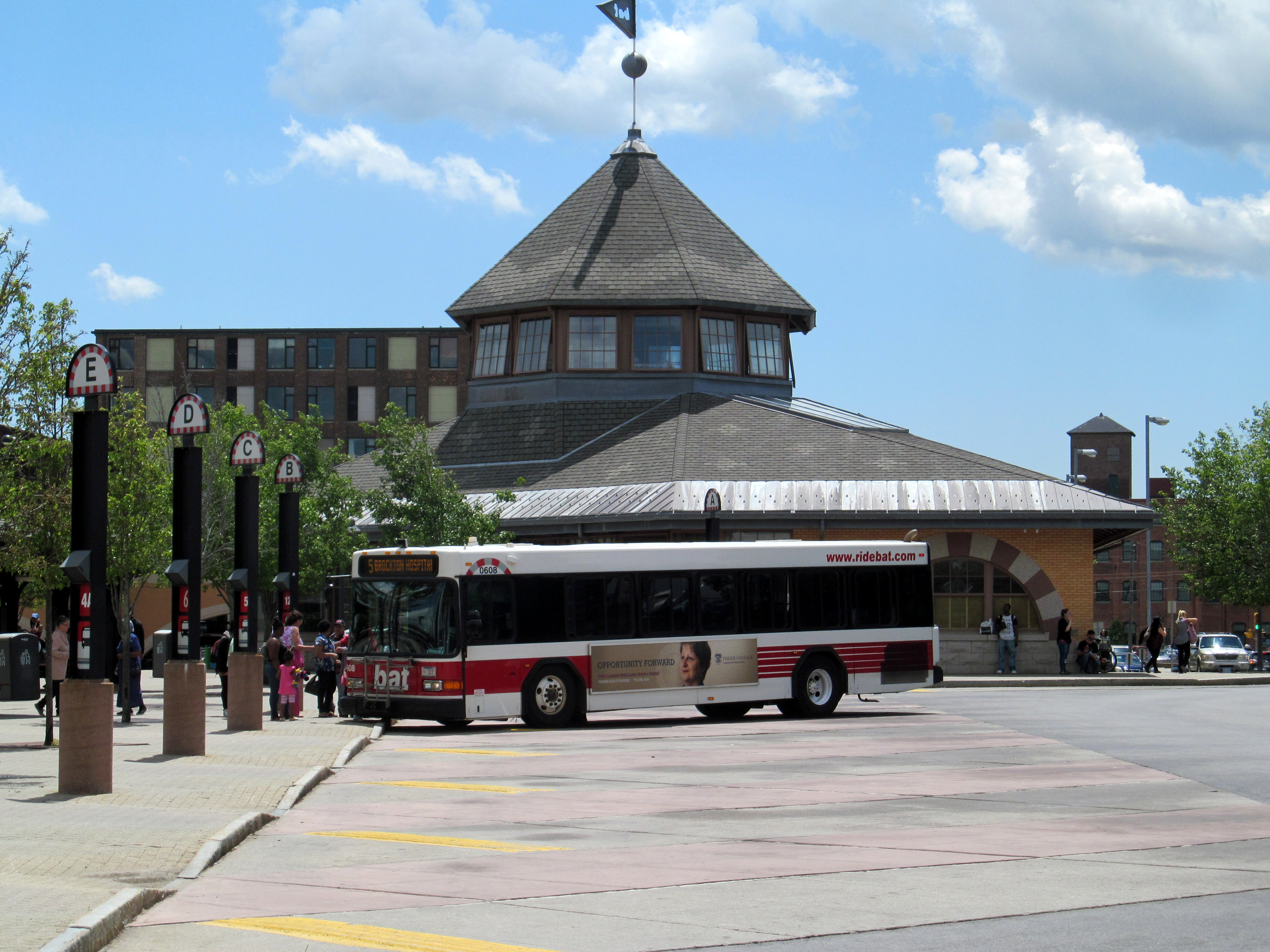
BAT route 5 bus at the BAT Centre in Brockton

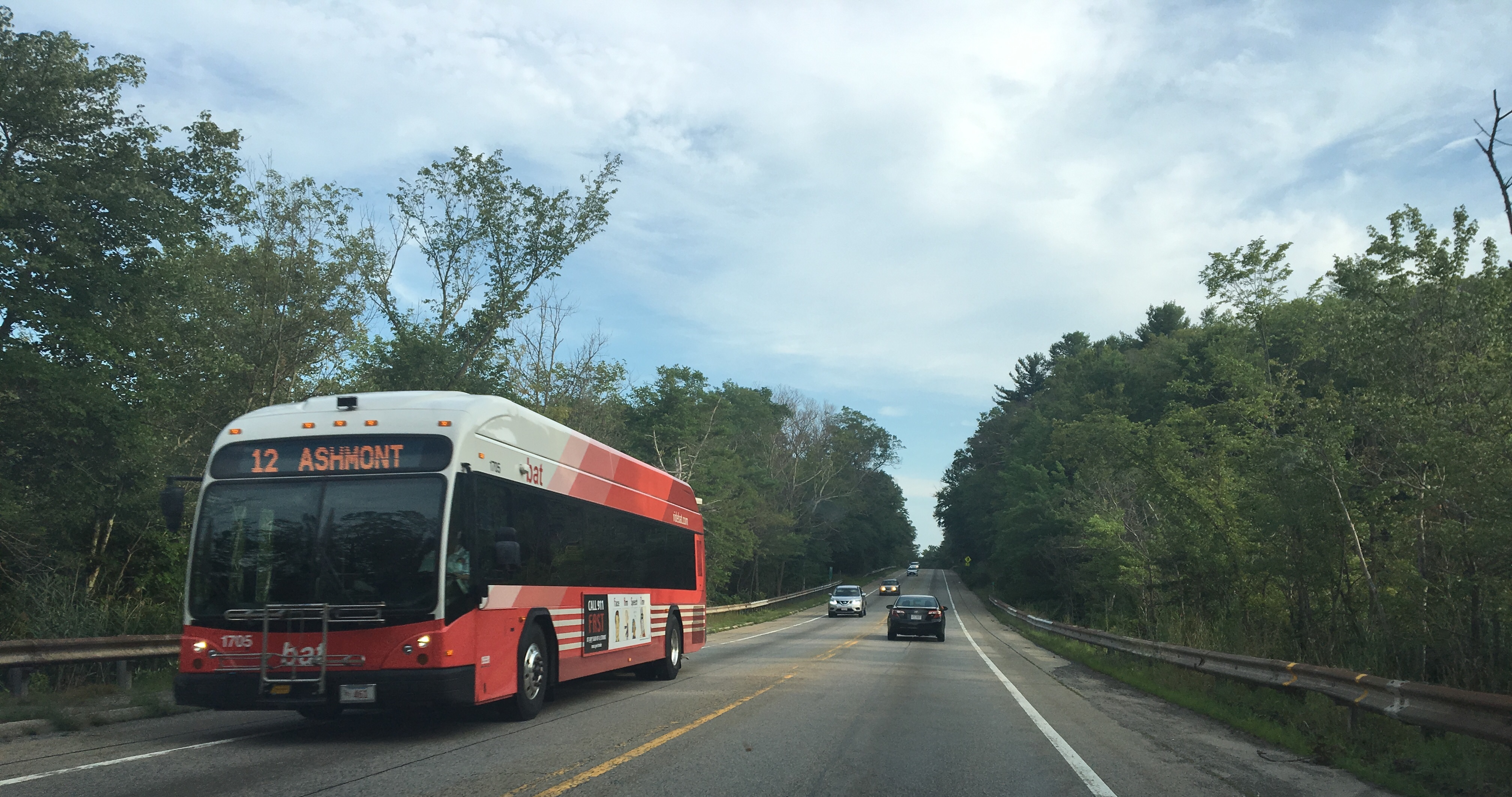
A route 12 bus in Blue Hills Reservation

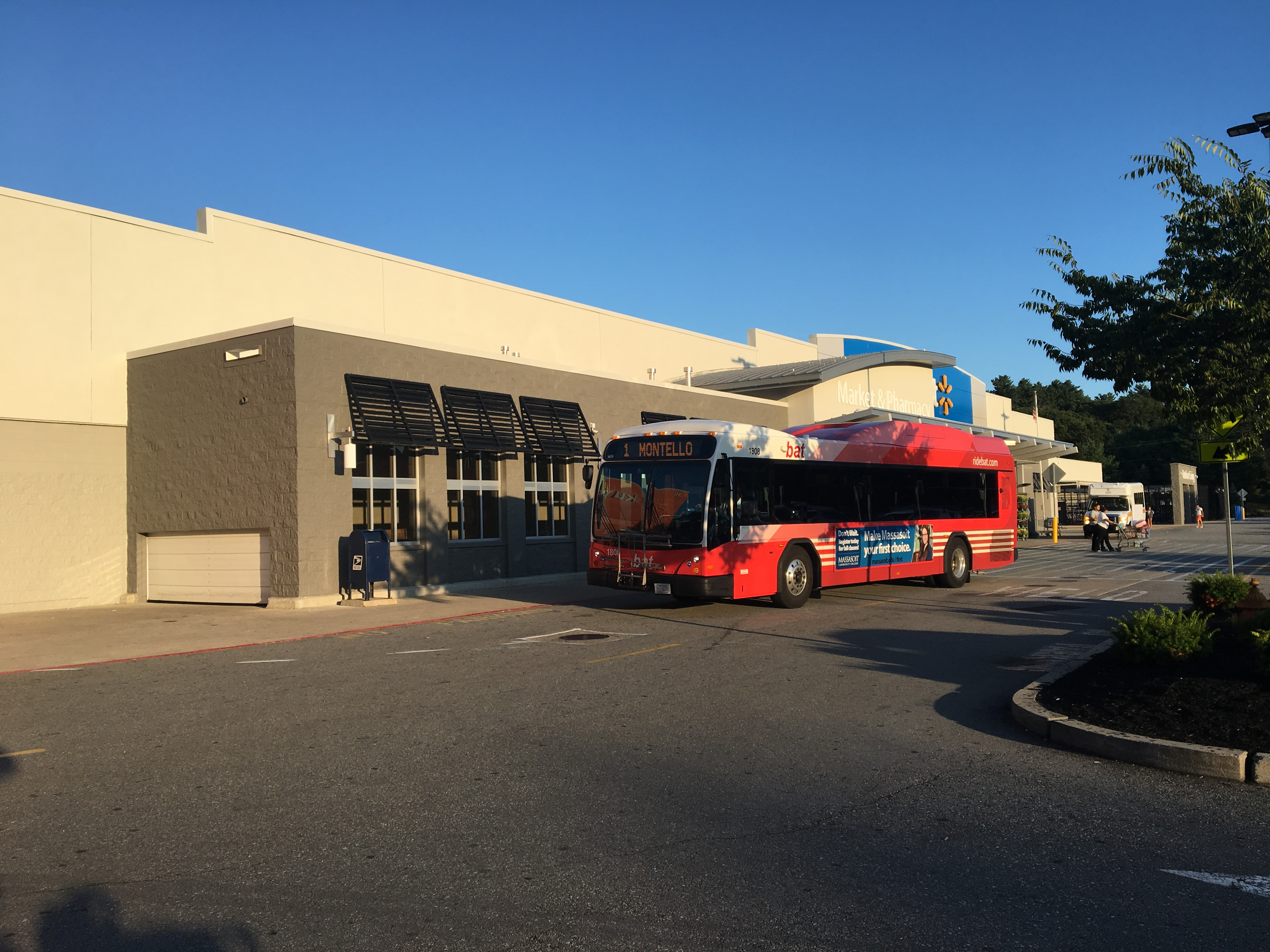
A route 1 bus in Avon in 2019

== See also ==
- Greater Attleboro Taunton Regional Transit Authority, also serving the same counties of Bristol, Norfolk, and Plymouth.
