= Braintree station (MBTA) =

Transit station in Braintree, Massachusetts, US

Braintree
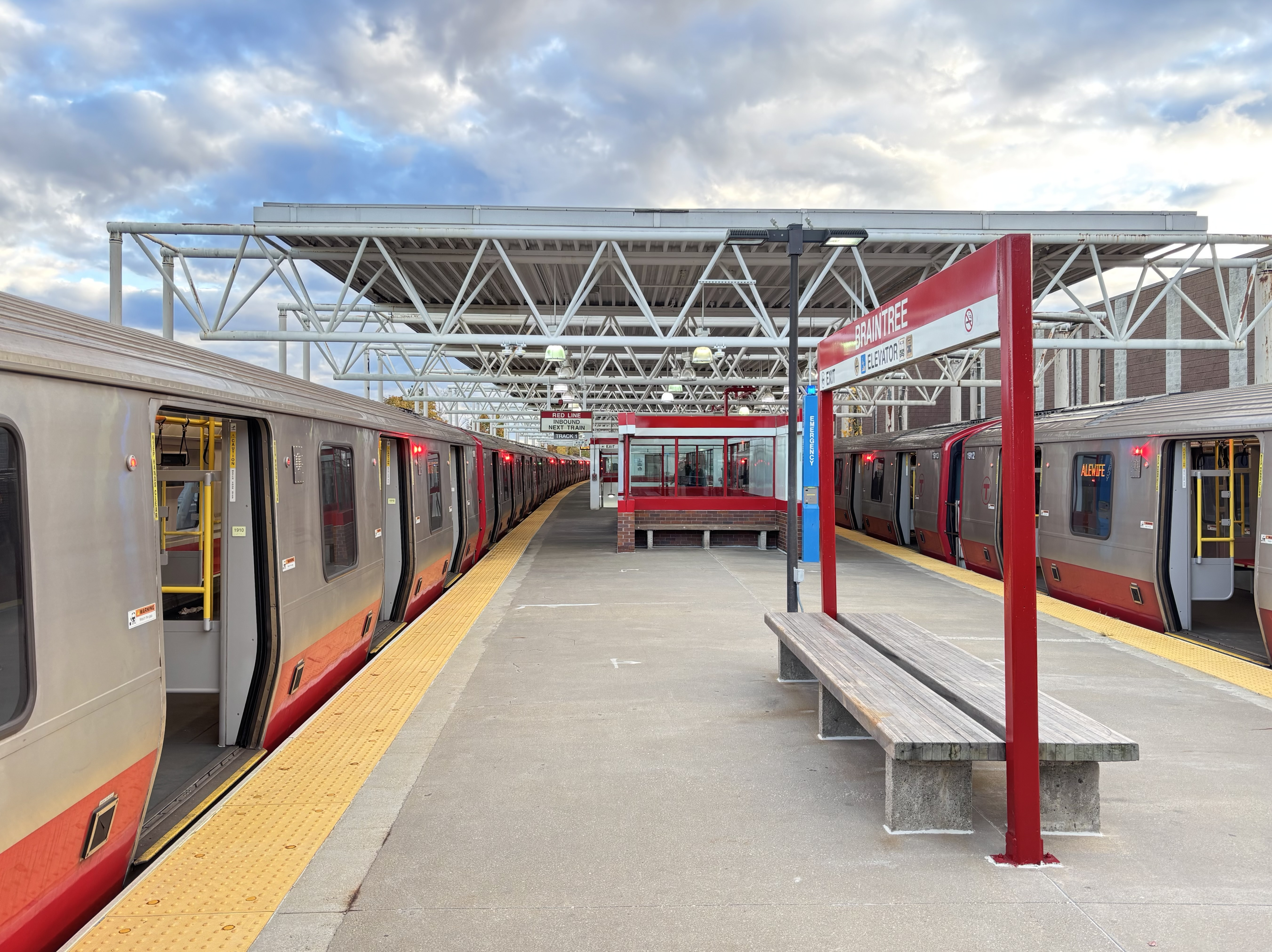
- Red Line trains at Braintree station in October 2025

General information
- Location: 197 Ivory Street; Braintree, Massachusetts
- Coordinates: 42.2075°N 71.0017°W
- Lines: Middleborough Main Line; Braintree Branch
- Platforms: 1 island platform (Red Line); 1 island platform (Commuter Rail)
- Tracks: 2 (Red Line); 2 (Commuter Rail)
- Connections: MBTA bus: 226, 230, 236

Construction
- Parking: 1,322 spaces ($9.00 fee)
- Cycle facilities: 30 spaces; "Pedal and Park" bicycle cage
- Accessible: Yes

Other information
- Fare zone: 2 (Commuter Rail)

History
- Opened: March 22, 1980 (Red Line); September 29, 1997 (Commuter Rail)

Passengers
- FY2019: 4,473 daily boardings (Red Line)
- 2024: 538 daily boardings (Commuter Rail)

Services
| Preceding station | MBTA | Following station |
|---|---|---|
| Quincy Adams toward Alewife | Red Line | Terminus |
| Quincy Center toward South Station | Fall River/New Bedford Line | Holbrook/Randolph toward Fall River or New Bedford |
| Quincy Center toward South Station | Kingston Line | South Weymouth toward Kingston |
| South Station Terminus | CapeFLYER | Brockton toward Hyannis |
Former services
| Preceding station | Cape Cod and Hyannis Railroad | Following station |
|---|---|---|
| Terminus | Braintree-Hyannis Closed 1988 | Holbrook toward Hyannis or Falmouth |
| Preceding station | New York, New Haven and Hartford Railroad | Following station |
Braintree station
| Quincy Adams toward Boston | Boston–Braintree | Terminus |
| West Quincy toward Boston | Granite Branch Service ended 1940 | Terminus |
| Quincy toward Boston | South Shore Line | East Braintree toward Greenbush |
| Quincy toward Boston | Boston–Plymouth | South Braintree toward Plymouth |
| Quincy toward Boston | Boston–Middleborough | South Braintree toward Middleborough |
South Braintree station
| Braintree toward Boston | Boston–Plymouth | South Weymouth toward Plymouth |
| Braintree toward Boston | Boston–Middleborough | Braintree Highlands toward Middleborough |
Location

Braintree station is a Massachusetts Bay Transportation Authority (MBTA) intermodal transit station in Braintree, Massachusetts. It is the southern terminus of the Braintree branch of the rapid transit Red Line, as well as a stop on the Fall River/New Bedford Line and Kingston Line of the MBTA Commuter Rail system.

It is located at Ivory and Union Streets. The tracks of the Red Line and commuter rail lines are all parallel to one another, their platforms are offset; the commuter rail platform is located north of Union Street, while the Red Line platform is south of the street. The station features a large park and ride garage, with space for 1,322 automobiles. Braintree is fully accessible on all modes.

== Station layout ==
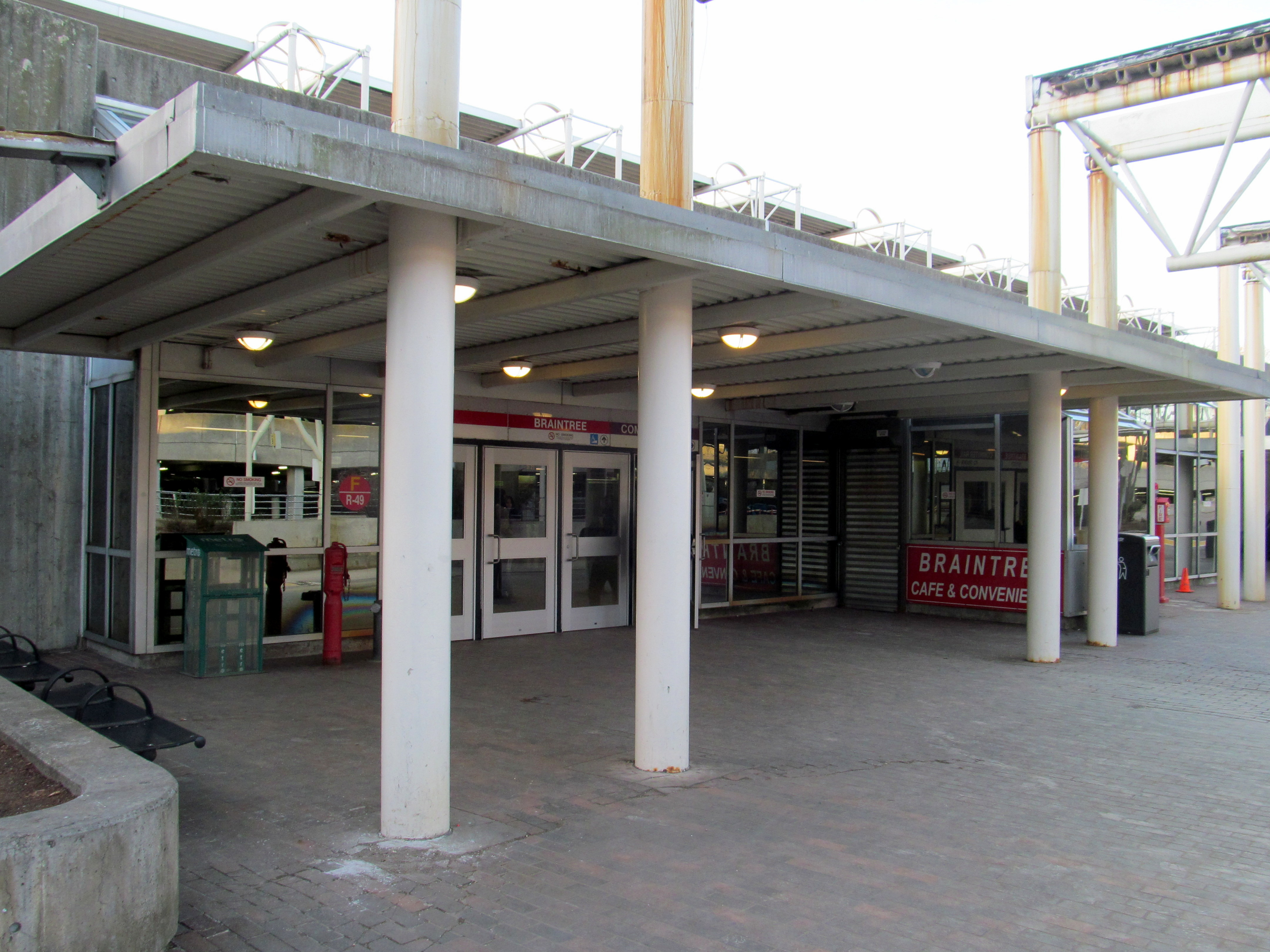
The Red Line entrance in 2015

The two Red Line tracks and two commuter rail tracks run parallel approximately north-south on an embankment through the station site, with the Red Line tracks on the west. The station has two island platforms. The Red Line platform is located south of Union Street, with the fare lobby under the platform. Tail tracks continue south to a four-track storage yard, Caddigan Yard. The three-level parking garage is located east of the Red Line platform. MBTA bus routes 226, 230, and 236 serve a busway between the Red Line platform and the garage.

The commuter rail platform, an 800-foot (240 m)-long high-level platform, is located north of Union Street. Access to the platform is at its south end, with a pedestrian level crossing of the eastern track. Ramps lead to Union Street, the busway, and the Red Line lobby. A five-track freight yard used by CSX and the Fore River Railroad is located east of the commuter rail platform. Braintree station is accessible on all modes.

== History ==
=== Previous stations ===
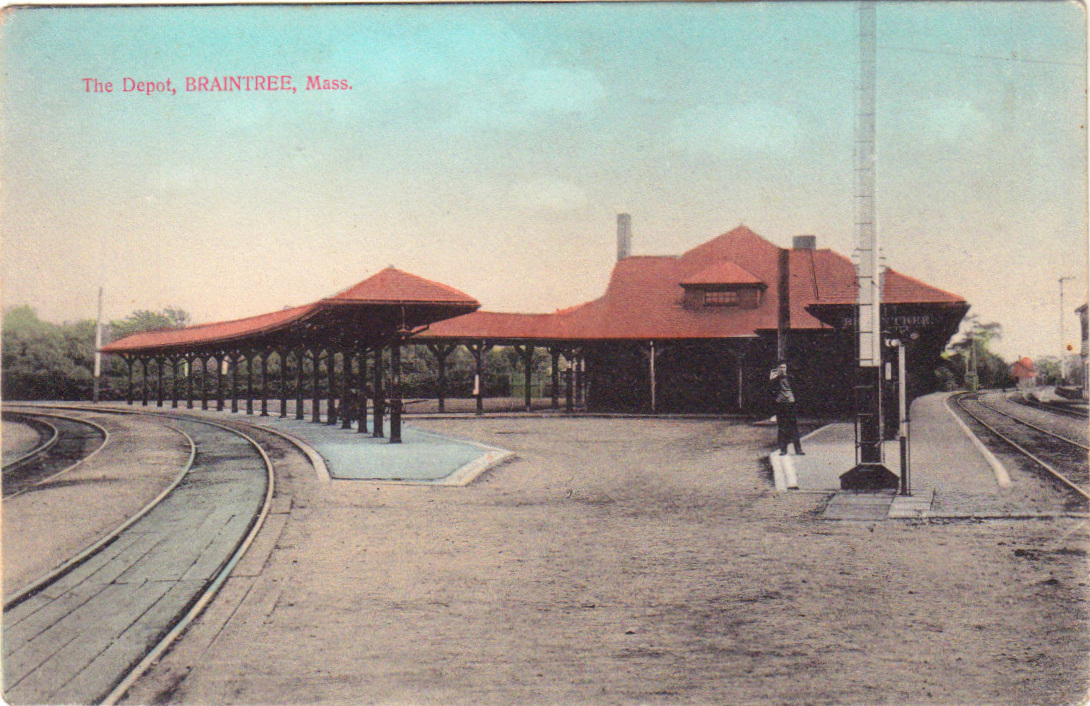
Early-20th-century postcard of Braintree station

The Old Colony Railroad opened between Boston and Plymouth through Braintree in November 1845. The Fall River Railroad opened from South Braintree (where it connected with the Old Colony) to Randolph on August 26, 1846, with through service to Fall River beginning that December. Stations were located at both Braintree and South Braintree soon after the railroads opened. By 1848, South Braintree was the outer terminus for some short turn trains providing local service.

The South Shore Railroad opened eastward from Braintree on January 1, 1849. The Old Colony and Fall River Railroad was formed in 1854 by the merger of its namesake railroads. By 1856, Braintree station was located at Elm Street where the South Shore split from the Old Colony, while South Braintree station was located north of Pearl Street where the lines to Plymouth and Fall River split. South Braintree station was destroyed by a fire on August 17, 1860.

Braintree station and the adjacent signal tower were destroyed by a fire, believed to be arson, on July 30, 1887. Designs were completed later that year for a replacement station, which opened in 1889. A new station at South Braintree was constructed in 1891, with a new freight house built around 1893.

The New York, New Haven and Hartford Railroad attempted to remove seven grade crossings in Quincy and Braintree in 1908, but met resistance from the towns. Another plan in 1913 to build road bridges at School, Elm, and River streets and an underpass at Union Street also fell through. The School Street crossing was eliminated by the construction of Church Street in 1936, and a Union Street underpass was built in 1937–38. The state issued a $9,789 contract (equivalent to $167,000 in 2024) in November 1937 for construction of platform canopies and other improvements related to the crossing elimination.

Old Colony Division service ended on June 30, 1959, as the Southeast Expressway was completed. Expressway construction had included a bridge for Elm Street, while River Street was severed. The former Braintree and South Braintree stations, the latter of which had been reused by the railroad's maintenance of way department, were both demolished around 1971 during Red Line construction.

=== MBTA station ===
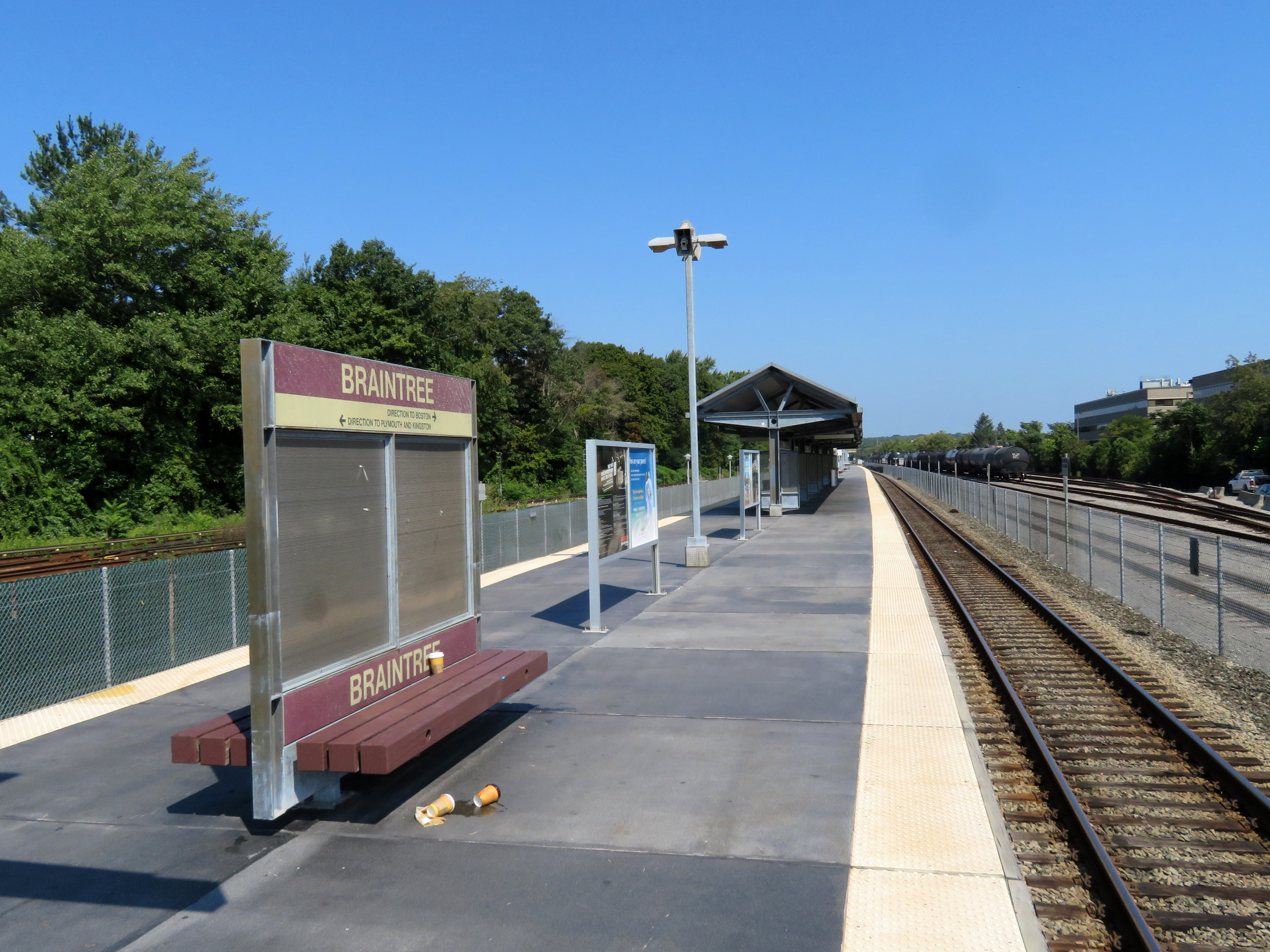
The 1997-opened commuter rail platform

A groundbreaking ceremony for Braintree station was held on July 13, 1977. The station opened on March 22, 1980, for Red Line service. Between 1984 and 1988, the Cape Cod and Hyannis Railroad operated a state-subsidized seasonal weekend service from Braintree to Hyannis, Massachusetts, on Cape Cod. Commuter rail service began on September 26, 1997, when the Middleborough/Lakeville Line and Plymouth/Kingston Line reopened. The Pearl Street grade crossing was replaced with a railroad bridge during construction. The station has been accessible since at least 1989.

MBTA feeder bus service from Marshfield and South Weymouth began in 1983. Marshfield service was turned over to Plymouth and Brockton Street Railway in 1985 and ran until 2008. South Weymouth service was turned over to the town in 1989; it ran under several private operators from 1990 to 2008.

From 1980 to 2007, a double entry fare and single exit fare were charged at Braintree and Quincy Adams when leaving the subway. The extra fares were discontinued as part of a fare increase and service change on January 1, 2007. Similar charges existed until 1980 on the inner stations on the Braintree Branch.

During service disruptions, Braintree can serve as the terminal for the Old Colony Lines and the Greenbush Line.

=== Garage repairs ===
Although built to last 50 years, the parking garage at Braintree began suffering concrete damage due to water leakage and ill-fitting structural elements. Repairs were performed to the Quincy Adams and Braintree garages in the mid 1990s. In 2015, the MBTA began a $4.4 million project to address urgent structural issues with the two garages, though full repair or replacement was still needed. Further construction on the Braintree garage took place in 2016. The deteriorated footbridge between the garage and station was closed in February 2017.

The garage was fully renovated from May 2018 through 2021 at a cost of $29 million; the station and garage were originally planned to remain open during the whole project. The work includes a canopy over the ramp to the commuter rail platform, and a canopy to replace the former footbridge. 400 garage spaces closed on February 10, 2020, to allow the project to be completed by June 2021 rather than December 2021. The garage was closed from October 5, 2020, to April 20, 2021, when part of the garage reopened.
