= Fall River Railroad (1846) =

Railroad line in Massachusetts, USA

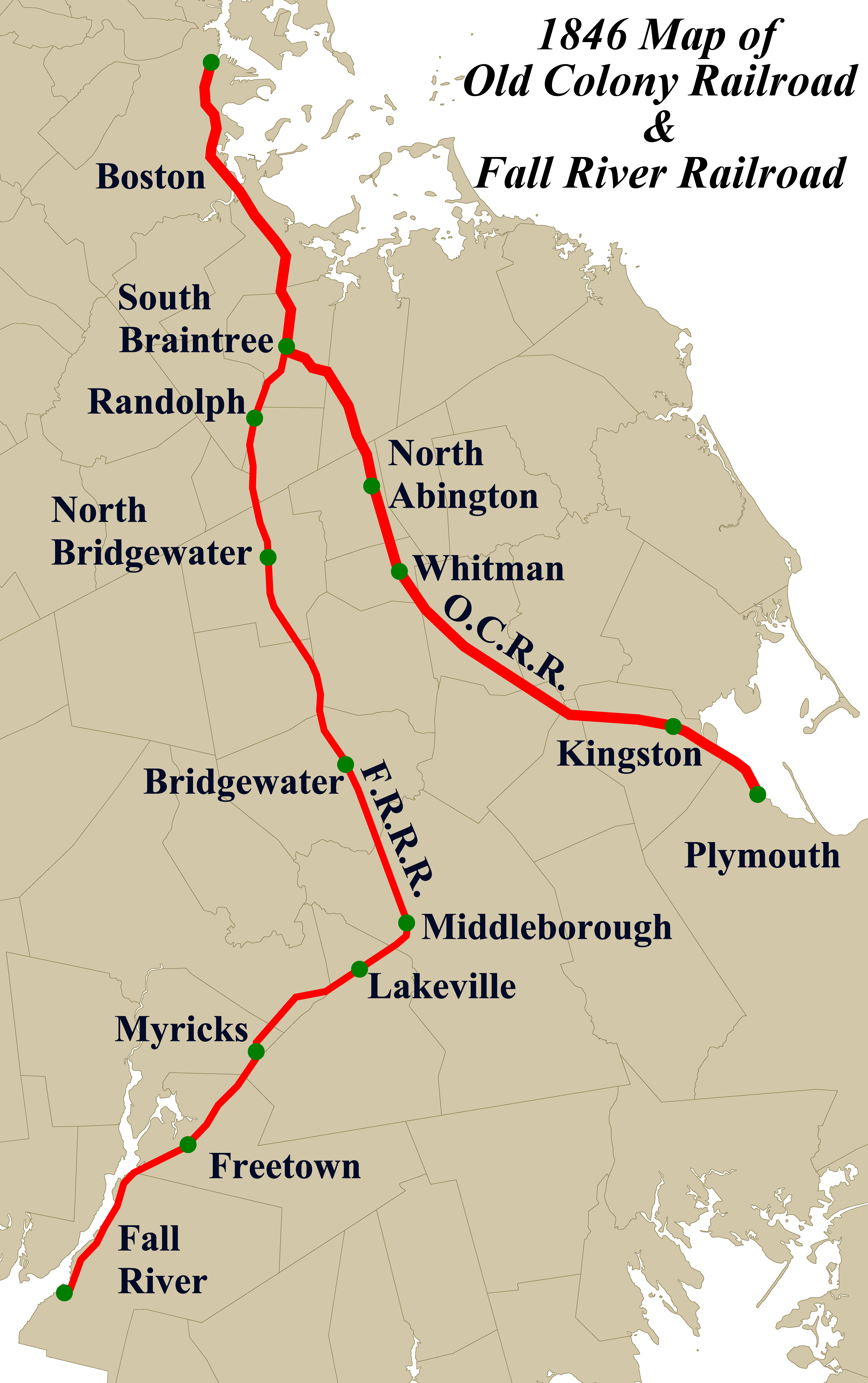
Map of Fall River Railroad in 1846

The Fall River Railroad was a railroad that ran between Fall River and Braintree, Massachusetts, United States. It was formed in 1845 as a merger between three railroads, which opened in phases in 1845 and 1846. The railroad merged into the Old Colony and Fall River Railroad in 1854.

== History ==
Route of the Fall River Railroad

The United Corporation of the Middleborough Railroad Corporation with the Fall River Branch Railroad Company and the Randolph and Bridgewater Railroad Corporation was formed in March 1845 by the merger of three unopened railroads:

- The Fall River Branch Railroad was incorporated in March 1844 to run north from the emerging textile town of Fall River to the New Bedford and Taunton Railroad either at Myricks Junction or Taunton (thus providing connections to Boston, New Bedford, and Providence).
- The Middleborough Railroad was incorporated in March 1845 to run south from Bridgewater through Middleborough to meet the Fall River Branch Railroad near Myricks.
- The Randolph and Bridgewater Railroad was incorporated in March 1845 to run north from Bridgewater through Randolph to meet the Old Colony Railroad in Braintree or Quincy.

The first segment opened between Myricks and downtown Fall River on June 9, 1845. In April 1846, the name was simplified to "Fall River Railroad". An extension from Myricks to Middleborough opened in mid-1846. A separate section of the line opened south from South Braintree to Randolph on August 26, 1846. That section was extended to North Bridgewater by October. The remaining portion between North Bridgewater and Middleborough opened on December 21, 1846, completing the line.

In 1847, the line was extended south a short distance to Fall River Wharf. That year, under the leadership of Richard Borden, the Fall River Railroad began regular steamship service to New York City. The service became known as the Fall River Line, which for many years was the preferred means of travel between Boston and New York City.

In 1854, the railroad merged with the Old Colony Railroad to become the Old Colony and Fall River Railroad. The combined company was renamed Old Colony and Newport Railway in 1863 and Old Colony Railway in 1872. It was acquired by the New York, New Haven and Hartford Railroad in 1893. Passenger service between Myricks and Middleborough ended in 1931, followed by freight service the next year, and the section was abandoned in 1937. Passenger service south of Myricks ended in 1958, and north of Middleborough the next year; freight service continued on both remaining sections.

The line between Middleborough and Boston (including the Braintree–Boston portion originally built by the Old Colony Railroad) is now the Middleborough Main Line, while the line between Myricks and Fall River is now the Fall River Secondary. The Cape Cod and Hyannis Railroad operated passenger service between Braintree and Cape Cod using the Middleborough Main Line between 1984 and 1988. The Massachusetts Bay Transportation Authority opened the Middleborough/Lakeville Line in 1997, restoring passenger service to the full length of the Middleborough Main Line. It became the Fall River/New Bedford Line in 2025 when the first phase of the South Coast Rail project opened. This restored passenger service over the Fall River Secondary between Fall River station and Myricks.

== See also ==
- Old Colony & Fall River Railroad Museum
