= Cape Cod and Hyannis Railroad =

Railroad in Massachusetts, US

Cape Cod & Hyannis Railroad

Overview
- Status: Closed
- Locale: Cape Cod
- Termini: Braintree Attleboro; Hyannis Falmouth
- Continues as: CapeFLYER Cape Cod Central Railroad
- Stations: 14

Service
- Type: Tourist
- Services: 1
- Ridership: 19,000 (1985)

History
- Opened: 1984
- Closed: 1988

Technical
- Track gauge: 1,435 mm (4 ft 8 1/2 in)

The Cape Cod & Hyannis Railroad was a railroad that provided tourist and seasonal passenger services in Southeastern Massachusetts in the 1980s. Its primary service operated from the Braintree MBTA station to Hyannis on Cape Cod; branches to Attleboro and Falmouth also operated in some years. The service ended after the 1988 summer season amid early-1989 state budget cuts in Massachusetts; much of the same trackage is being used for the seasonal CapeFLYER service.

== History ==
1988 spring schedule

The Cape Cod & Hyannis Railroad began running Hyannis - East Sandwich excursion service in 1981. Excursion service to Falmouth was added in 1982 and 1983. In 1984, the state provided $148,000 in funding to allow the railroad to provide an otherwise-unsubsidized demonstration of regional service connecting to the newly completed Red Line rapid transit line at Braintree. Service between Braintree and the Cape Cod destinations of Hyannis and Falmouth began on June 30, 1984. Trains ran from Braintree to Hyannis and Falmouth. (Service directly to Boston was not possible because the Neponset River bridge had been destroyed by a 1960 fire; a new Neponset River bridge was not opened until Old Colony Lines commuter service began in 1997.) Intermediate stops initially included Holbrook, Brockton, Bridgewater, Middleboro, Wareham, and Buzzards Bay, plus Sandwich and West Barnstable on Hyannis trains. The two daily round trips - one to each Cape Cod terminal - were the first regular service between the Boston area and the Cape in 25 years. Braintree-Hyannis trips took three hours.

Falmouth service (which ended quickly in 1984) and mid-week runs were dropped due to low ridership. During mid-1985, the railroad operated two round trips on Saturdays and Sundays, with two round trips on Fridays and Mondays for parts of the summer. Running time was reduced to 2 1/2 hours; ridership rose from 8,000 passengers in 1984 to 19,000 in 1985.

In 1986, the state approved a $5.5 million multi-year subsidy for seven-day-a-week seasonal service. The railroad's insurance premiums skyrocketed, causing service to be delayed until mid-July. Despite the delay, ridership still increased. The state continued to subsidize weekday service for the next two years.

Branch line service to Falmouth via a new stop at Cataumet resumed in 1988, along with a new branch to Attleboro via Taunton. Subsidies were cut from the state budget in 1989, and the CC&HR did not resume service that year. In its final year of operation, the CC&HR carried 53,000 passengers between Braintree and Cape Cod, with an additional 6,700 riders on the Attleboro branch. State audits in 1989 and 1990 showed that the family owners of the CC&HR had substantially profited from the subsidies, partially due to a lack of state oversight.

Seasonal Amtrak Cape Codder service, which had begun in 1986, continued until 1996. The Bay Colony Railroad begin operating excursion service between Hyannis and Sagamore until the Cape Cod Railroad brand in 1989; the Cape Cod Central Railroad took over excursion service between Hyannis and Buzzards Bay in 1999. Commuter service between Boston and Middleborough resumed in 1997 when the Middleborough/Lakeville Line of the MBTA Commuter Rail was opened. In 2013, the state began CapeFLYER seasonal weekend service, operated by the MBTA using commuter rail equipment. The CapeFLYER provides similar service to the CC&HR, though it operates directly from Boston and makes fewer stops.
