= List of Old Colony Railroad stations =

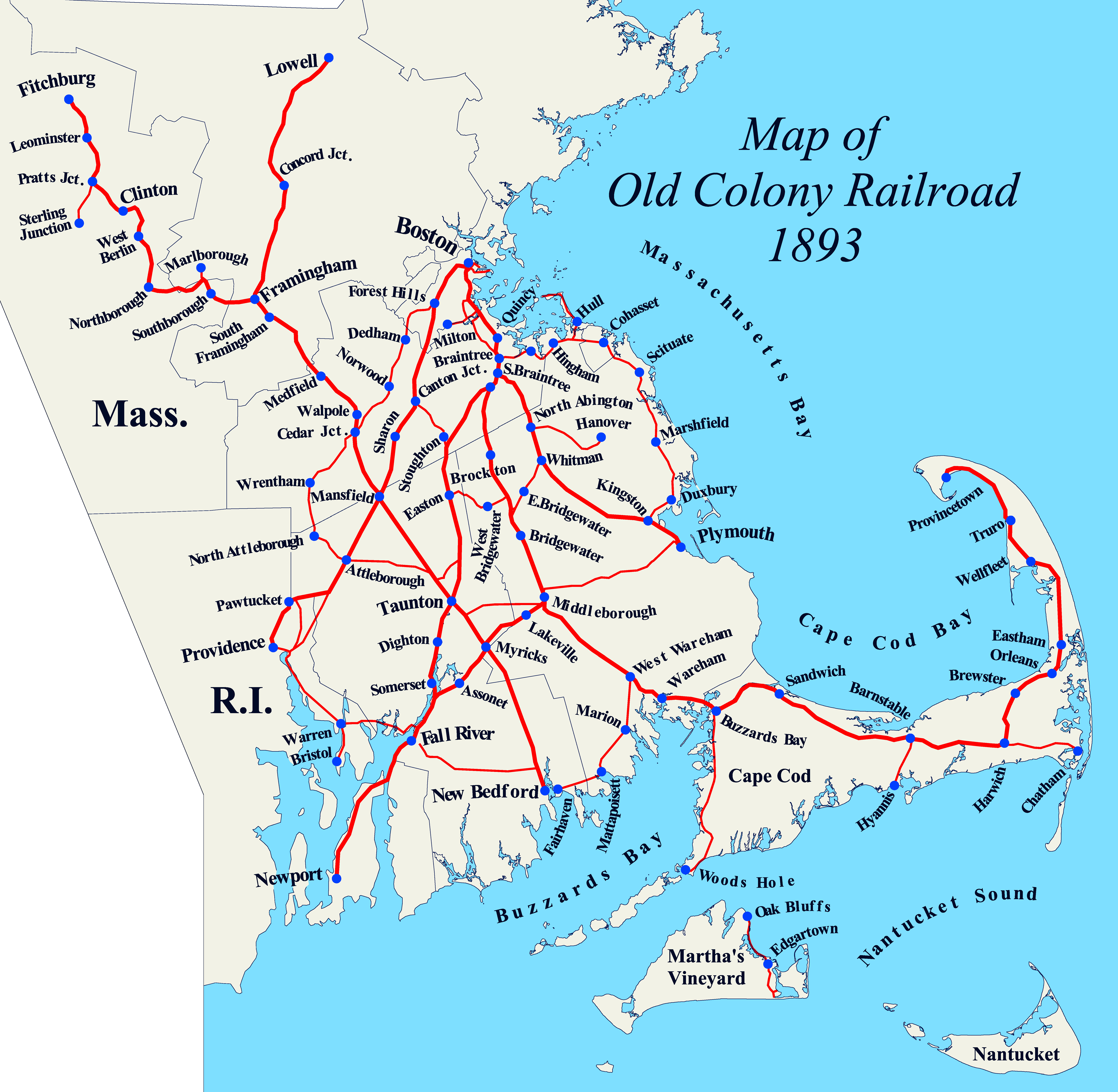
Map of OCRR lines, 1893

The following is a list of historic Old Colony Railroad (OCRR) stations, at the time of the 1893 lease by the New York, New Haven and Hartford Railroad and shortly after. City/town include current town name, some of which were incorporated after 1893. Stations currently used by the Massachusetts Bay Transportation Authority or Amtrak are indicated within the notes column.

All stations are located in the state of Massachusetts unless otherwise noted.

== Central Division ==
=== Boston to Plymouth ===
Location	Station	Miles (km)	Image	Notes
Boston	Boston	0.0 (0.0)		Boston terminus moved from Kneeland Street to South Station in 1899
Boston	South Boston	0.7 (1.1)		
Boston	Crescent Avenue	2.4 (3.9)		Present location of JFK/UMass station on the Red Line, Greenbush Line, Kingston Line, and Fall River/New Bedford Line
Boston	Savin Hill	3.0 (4.8)		Present location of Savin Hill station on the Red Line
Boston	Harrison Square	3.6 (5.8)		Junction with Shawmut Branch
Boston	Popes Hill	4.3 (6.9)		
Boston	Neponset	4.9 (7.9)		Junction with Dorchester and Milton Branch
Quincy	Atlantic	5.5 (8.9)		Junction with Granite Branch
Quincy	Norfolk Downs	6.1 (9.8)		
Quincy	Wollaston Heights	6.7 (10.8)		Present location of Wollaston station on the Red Line
Quincy	Quincy	8.0 (12.9)		Present location of Quincy Center on the Red Line, Greenbush Line, Kingston Line, and Fall River/New Bedford Line
Quincy	Quincy Adams	8.7 (14.0)		Originally named South Quincy; Present location of Quincy Adams station on the Red Line
Braintree	Braintree	10.1 (16.3)		Junction with South Shore Branch
Braintree	South Braintree	11.4 (18.3)		Junction with Middleborough-Fall River main line
Weymouth	South Weymouth	14.9 (24.0)		
Abington	North Abington	17.8 (28.6)		Junction with Hanover Branch
Abington	Abington	19.2 (30.9)		Present location of Abington station on the Kingston Line
Whitman	Whitman	21.1 (34.0)		Junction with East Bridgewater Branch; Present location of Halifax station on the Kingston Line
Hanson	North Hanson	23.1 (37.2)		
Hanson	South Hanson	24.6 (39.6)		Present location of Hanson station on the Kingston Line
Hanson	Burrage	26.2 (42.2)		Also called Bournetown
Hanson	Monponsett	27.1 (43.6)		
Halifax	Halifax	28.4 (45.7)		Present location of Halifax station on the Kingston Line
Kingston	Silver Lake	29.9 (48.1)		Also called Plympton
Kingston	Kingston	33.3 (53.6)		Junction with South Shore Branch
Plymouth	Cordage	35.4 (57.0)		Originally named North Plymouth and later Seaside; Present location of Plymouth station on the Kingston Line
Plymouth	Plymouth	37.4 (60.2)		Junction with Plymouth and Middleborough Branch

=== Shawmut Branch ===
Location	Station	Miles (km)	Image	Notes
Boston	Harrison Square	3.6 (5.8)		Junction with Boston-Plymouth main line
Boston	Fields Corner	4.0 (6.4)		Present location of Fields Corner station on the Red Line
Boston	Shawmut	4.6 (7.4)		Consolidated from stations at Melville Avenue and Centre Street in 1884; Present location of Shawmut station on the Red Line
Boston	Ashmont	5.2 (8.4)		Present location of Ashmont station on the Red Line and Mattapan Line
Boston	Cedar Grove	5.6 (9.0)		Present location of Cedar Grove station on the Mattapan Line
Milton	Milton	6.4 (10.3)		Junction with Dorchester and Milton Branch; Previously named Milton Lower Mills; Present location of Milton station on the Mattapan Line

=== Dorchester and Milton Branch ===
Location	Station	Miles (km)	Image	Notes
Boston	Neponset	4.9 (7.9)		Junction with Boston-Plymouth main line
Boston	Granite Bridge	5.9 (9.5)		
Milton	Milton	6.8 (10.9)		Junction with Shawmut Branch; Previously named Milton Lower Mills and Milton Mills; Present location of Milton station on the Mattapan Line
Milton	Central Avenue	7.1 (11.4)		Present location of Central Avenue station on the Mattapan Line
Boston	Mattapan	8.1 (13.0)		Present location of Mattapan station on the Mattapan Line

=== Granite Branch ===
Location	Station	Mile (km)	Image	Notes
Quincy	Atlantic	5.5 (8.9)		Junction with Boston-Plymouth main line
Quincy	Montclair	6.1 (9.8)		
Milton	East Milton	7.5 (12.1)		
Quincy	West Quincy	8.6 (13.8)		

=== South Shore Branch ===
Location	Station	Mile (km)	Image	Notes
Braintree	Braintree			Junction with Boston-Plymouth main line
Braintree	East Braintree			
Weymouth	Weymouth			Now Weymouth Landing/East Braintree, served by Greenbush Line
Weymouth	Weymouth Heights			
Weymouth	East Weymouth			Now served by Greenbush Line
Hingham	West Hingham			Now served by Greenbush Line
Hingham	Hingham			
Hingham	Old Colony House			Junction with Nantasket Beach Branch; now Nantasket Junction, served by Greenbush Line
Hingham	North Cohasset			
Cohasset	King Street			
Cohasset	Cohasset			
Cohasset	Beechwood			
Scituate	North Scituate			Now served by Greenbush Line
Scituate	Egypt			
Scituate	Scituate			
Scituate	Greenbush			Now served by Greenbush Line
Marshfield	East Marshfield			
Marshfield	Sea View			
Marshfield	Marshfield Centre			
Marshfield	Marshfield			
Marshfield	Webster Place			
Duxbury	Duxbury			
Duxbury	South Duxbury			
Duxbury	Island Creek			
Kingston	Kingston			Junction with Boston-Plymouth main line

=== Nantasket Beach Branch ===
Location	Station	Mile (km)	Image	Notes
Hingham	Old Colony House			Junction with South Shore Branch; now Nantasket Junction, served by Greenbush Line
Hull	Nantasket			
Hull	Surfside			
Hull	Irvington			
Hull	Kenberma			
Hull	Strawberry Hill			
Hull	Bay Side			
Hull	Allerton			
Hull	Windermere			
Hull	Stony Beach			
Hull	Hull			
Hull	Pemberton			

=== Hanover Branch ===
Location	Station	Mile (km)	Image	Notes
Abington	North Abington			Junction with Boston-Plymouth main line; station building is now a restaurant
Rockland	Rockland			
Hanover	West Hanover			
Hanover	Winslows Crossing			
Hanover	South Hanover			
Hanover	Curtis Crossing			
Hanover	Hanover			

=== Whitman to Bridgwater Junction ===
Location	Station	Mile (km)	Image	Notes
Whitman	Whitman			Junction with Boston-Plymouth main line; now served by Kingston Line
Whitman	Washington Street			
East Bridgewater	Browns Station			
East Bridgewater	East Bridgewater			
East Bridgewater	Elmwood			
West Bridgewater	Westdale			Junction with South Braintree-Fall River main line

=== Plymouth and Middleborough Branch ===
Location	Station	Mile (km)	Image	Notes
Plymouth	Plymouth			Junction with Boston-Plymouth main line
Plymouth	Darby			
Carver	North Carver			
Middleborough	East Middleborough			
Middleborough	Middleborough			Junction with South Braintree-Fall River, Cape Cod and Taunton lines; Middleborough station on the Fall River/New Bedford Line is nearby

=== South Braintree to Fall River ===
Location	Station	Mile (km)	Image	Notes
Braintree	South Braintree			Junction with Boston-Plymouth main line, site is now a shopping plaza
Braintree	Mayflower Park			Junction with Mayflower Park-Fall River main line, also known as Braintree Highlands
Holbrook	Holbrook			Now served by Fall River/New Bedford Line
Avon	Avon			
Brockton	Montello			Now served by Fall River/New Bedford Line
Brockton	Brockton			Now served by Fall River/New Bedford Line and CapeFlyer
Brockton	Campello			Now served by Fall River/New Bedford Line
West Bridgewater	Matfield			Junction with West Bridgewater Branch
West Bridgewater	Westdale			Junction with Whitman Branch
Bridgewater	Bridgewater			Station building is now a Burger King restaurant
Bridgewater	Titicut			
Middleborough	Middleborough			Junction with Cape Cod, Taunton, and Plymouth branches; Middleborough station is located nearby
Lakeville	Lakeville			
Berkley	Myricks			Junction with Taunton-New Bedford Branch
Freetown	Assonet			
Freetown	Crystal Spring			
Fall River	Somerset Junction			
Fall River	Steep Brook			
Fall River	Fall River			junction with Warren Branch; Fall River station now located at the site
Fall River	Fall River Wharf			Fall River Line wharf, on spur from main line
Fall River	Ferry Street			Future Battleship Cove station to be served by South Coast Rail

=== Mayflower Park to Fall River ===
Location	Station	Mile (km)	Image	Notes
Braintree	Mayflower Park			Junction with South Braintree-Fall River main line; also known as Braintree Highlands
Randolph	Randolph			
Stoughton	North Stoughton			
Stoughton	South Stoughton			
Stoughton	Stoughton Junction			Junction with Boston and Providence Railroad Stoughton Branch
Easton	North Easton			
Easton	Easton			Junction with West Bridgewater Branch
Raynham	Raynham			Junction with Whittenton Branch
Taunton	Dean Street			Future Taunton station to be served by South Coast Rail
Taunton	Weir Junction			
Taunton	Weir Village			
Taunton	North Dighton			
Dighton	Dighton			
Somerset	Somerset			
Fall River	Somerset Junction			Junction with South Braintree-Fall River main line

=== Fall River to Newport ===
State	Location	Station	Mile (km)	Image	Notes
MA	Fall River	Ferry Street			Future Battleship Cove station to be served by South Coast Rail
RI	Tiverton	Tiverton			
RI	Portsmouth	Bristol Ferry			
RI	Portsmouth	Coal Mines			
RI	Portsmouth	Portsmouth Grove			
RI	Newport	Middletown			
RI	Newport	Newport			Served by heritage Newport and Narragansett Bay Railroad

=== West Bridgewater Branch ===
Location	Station	Mile (km)	Image	Notes
Easton	Easton			junction with Mayflower Park-Fall River main line
Easton	South Easton			
Easton	Sequosett			
West Bridgewater	Cocheset			
West Bridgewater	West Bridgewater			
West Bridgewater	Matfield			junction with South Braintree-Fall River main line

=== Middleborough to Taunton ===
Location	Station	Mile (km)	Image	Notes
Middleborough	Middleborough	0 (0)		Junction with South Braintree-Fall River, Cape Cod, and Plymouth lines; Middleborough station on the Fall River/New Bedford Line is nearby
Lakeville	Turnpike	2.0 (3.2)		
Lakeville	North Lakeville	2.9 (4.7)		
Taunton	Chage's	3.8 (6.1)		
Taunton	East Taunton	5.8 (9.3)		
Taunton	Cotley Junction	7.9 (12.7)		Not a station - junction with Taunton and New Bedford lines

=== Whittenton Branch ===
Location	Station	Mile (km)	Image	Notes
Raynham	Raynham			Junction with Mayflower Park–Fall River mainline
Taunton	Whittenton			
Taunton	Whittenton Junction			Junction with Taunton Branch

== Cape Cod Division ==
=== Middleborough to Provincetown ===
Location	Station	Miles (km)	Image	Notes
Middleborough	Middleborough	34.6 (55.7)		Junction with South Braintree-Fall River, Taunton, and Plymouth branches; Middleborough station on the Fall River/New Bedford Line is nearby
Middleborough	Rock	39.5 (63.6)		
Middleborough	South Middleboro	41.7 (67.1)		
Wareham	Tremont	45.6 (73.4)		Junction with Fairhaven Branch; also known as Tremont
Wareham	South Wareham	47.2 (76.0)		
Wareham	Parker Mills	48.6 (78.2)		
Wareham	Wareham	49.3 (79.3)		Now Wareham Village, served by CapeFlyer
Wareham	Tempest Knob	49.8 (80.1)		
Wareham	Onset	51.3 (82.6)		Also called Agawam, East Wareham, and Onset Junction
Wareham	Onset	52.7 (84.8)		Also called Onset Bay. Closed in 1891.
Bourne	Buzzards Bay	54.6 (87.9)		Junction with Woods Hole Branch; originally named Cohasset Narrows, now served by CapeFlyer and heritage Cape Cod Central Railroad
Bourne	Bourne	56.0 (90.1)		Originally named Monument, now served by CapeFlyer
Bourne	Bournedale	58.8 (94.6)		
Sandwich	Sagamore	60.0 (96.6)		Served by the heritage Cape Cod Central Railroad
Sandwich	Sandwich	62.5 (100.6)		
Sandwich	East Sandwich	65.2 (104.9)		
Barnstable	West Barnstable	69.7 (112.2)		Served by the heritage Cape Cod Central Railroad
Barnstable	Pond Village	72.3 (116.4)		Short-lived station – only in service briefly after the line opened
Barnstable	Barnstable	73.3 (118.0)		
Yarmouth	Yarmouth	75.8 (122.0)		Junction with Hyannis Branch; also known as Yarmouthport
Yarmouth	Bass River	78.7 (126.7)		Also known as South Yarmouth
Dennis	South Dennis	81.4 (131.0)		
Harwich	North Harwich	83.0 (133.6)		
Harwich	Harwich	84.9 (136.6)		Junction with Chatham Branch
Harwich	Pleasant Lake	86.8 (139.7)		
Brewster	Brewster	89.7 (144.4)		
Brewster	East Brewster	92.2 (148.4)		
Orleans	Orleans	94.6 (152.2)		
Eastham	Eastham	97.5 (156.9)		
Eastham	North Eastham	99.9 (160.8)		
Wellfleet	South Wellfleet	103.5 (166.6)		
Wellfleet	Wellfleet	106.2 (170.9)		
Truro	South Truro	109.1 (175.6)		
Truro	Truro	111.0 (178.6)		
Truro	Corn Hill	111.6 (179.6)		
Truro	North Truro	114.0 (183.5)		Later named Moorland
Provincetown	Puritan Heights	117.7 (189.4)		
Provincetown	Provincetown	120.1 (193.3)		

=== Fairhaven Branch ===
Location	Station	Miles (km)	Image	Notes
Wareham	Tremont	45.6 (73.4)		Junction with Cape Cod main line
Marion	Marion	50.6 (81.4)		
Mattapoisett	Mattapoisett	55.4 (89.2)		
Fairhaven	Fairhaven	60.5 (97.4)		

=== Woods Hole Branch ===
Location	Station	Miles (km)	Image	Notes
Bourne	Buzzards Bay	54.6 (87.9)		Junction with Cape Cod main line, now served by CapeFlyer and heritage Cape Cod Central Railroad
Bourne	Gray Gables	55.4 (89.2)		
Bourne	Monument Beach	56.4 (90.8)		
Bourne	Pocasset	58.2 (93.7)		
Bourne	Cataumet	60.1 (96.7)		
Falmouth	North Falmouth	61.3 (98.7)		Junction with Camp Edwards spur
Falmouth	West Falmouth	64.6 (104.0)		
Falmouth	Falmouth	68.4 (110.1)		
Falmouth	Woods Hole	72.0 (115.9)		

=== Hyannis Branch ===
Location	Station	Miles (km)	Image	Notes
Yarmouth	Yarmouth	75.8 (122.0)		Junction with Cape Cod main line
Yarmouth	Camp	77.0 (123.9)		
Barnstable	Hyannis	79.2 (127.5)		Now Hyannis Transportation Center, served by Cape Flyer and heritage Cape Cod Central Railroad
Barnstable	Hyannisport	80.85 (130.1)		

=== Chatham Branch ===
Location	Station	Miles (km)	Image	Notes
Harwich	Harwich	84.9 (136.6)		Junction with Cape Cod main line
Harwich	Harwich Center	85.7 (137.9)		
Harwich	South Harwich	87.6 (141.0)		
Chatham	South Chatham	88.7 (142.7)		
Chatham	West Chatham	90.1 (145.0)		
Chatham	Chatham	92.0 (148.1)		Now the Chatham Railroad Museum

=== Martha's Vineyard Railroad ===
Location	Station	Miles (km)	Image	Notes
Oak Bluffs	Oak Bluffs	0.0 (0.0)		
Edgartown	Edgartown	5.5 (8.9)		
Edgartown	Katama	8.6 (13.8)		At Mattakeset Lodge
Edgartown	South Beach	8.6 (13.8)		On a short branch that left the mainline west of Katama

== Taunton and New Bedford lines ==
=== Mansfield to New Bedford ===
Location	Station	Mile (km)	Image	Notes
Mansfield	Mansfield			Junction with Boston and Providence line; current MBTA Commuter Rail station
Norton	Norton			historic depot now a private residence
Taunton	Cranes			
Taunton	Attleborough Junction			Junction with Taunton-Attleborough Branch
Taunton	Whittenton Junction			Junction with Whittenton Branch
Taunton	Taunton Central			site now a shopping plaza
Taunton	Weir Junction			Junction with Mayflower Park-Fall River main line
Taunton	Cotley Junction			Not a station - junction with Middleborough–Taunton branch. East Taunton station now located nearby.
Berkley	Myricks			Junction with South Braintree-Fall River main line
Freetown	East Freetown			
Freetown	Braleys			
New Bedford	Acushnet			Church Street station now located nearby
New Bedford	Mount Pleasant Junction			Junction with Fall River line
New Bedford	New Bedford			New Bedford station now located at the site
New Bedford	New Bedford Wharf			

=== New Bedford to Fall River ===
Location	Station	Mile (km)	Image	Notes
New Bedford	Mount Pleasant			near junction with Taunton-New Bedford line
Dartmouth	North Dartmouth			
Dartmouth	Hicksville			
Westport	Westport Factory			located at Highland Road
Westport	Hemlock			
Westport	North Westport			
Fall River	Flint Village			located at Quequechan Street
Fall River	Watuppa			located at what is now Plymouth Avenue

=== Taunton to Attleborough ===
Location	Station	Mile (km)	Image	Notes
Taunton	Attleborough Junction			Junction with Taunton-Mansfield line
Norton	Norton Furnace			
Norton	Barrowsville			
Norton	Chartley			
Attleborough	Bearcroft			
Attleborough	Attleboro			

== Northern Division ==
=== Mansfield to Fitchburg ===
Location	Station	Mile (km)	Image	Notes
Mansfield	Mansfield			junction with Boston and Providence line; Mansfield (MBTA station) Commuter Rail stop
Foxborough	Foxborough			
Foxborough	North Foxborough			
Walpole	South Walpole			crosses Wrentham-Dedham line
Walpole	Walpole			crosses New York and New England Railroad main line
Medfield	Medfield			
Sherborn	South Sherborn			
Framingham	South Framingham			line crosses Boston and Albany Railroad main line; Framingham (MBTA station) Commuter Rail stop located behind historic Boston and Albany station, which is now a restaurant
Framingham	Lake View			
Framingham	Framingham			junction with Framingham and Lowell line
Southborough	Fayville			
Southborough	Southborough			
Marlborough	Marlborough Junction			junction with short branch to Marlborough
Northborough	Rock Hill			
Northborough	Northborough			
Berlin	Berlin			
Berlin	West Berlin			crosses Boston & Maine Central Mass. Division line
Bolton	Ballville			
Clinton	Lancaster Mills Branch			Junction with Lancaster Mills Branch
Clinton	Clinton			crosses Boston & Maine Worcester, Nashua and Portland Division line
Sterling	Pratts Junction			Junction with Fitchburg and Worcester Branch; south to Sterling and Sterling Junction
Leominster	Gates Crossing			
Leominster	Leominster			
Leominster	West Leominster			
Fitchburg	South Fitchburg			
Fitchburg	Fitchburg			junction with Fitchburg Railroad; Fitchburg (MBTA station) Commuter Rail stop

=== Framingham to Lowell ===
Location	Station	Mile (km)	Image	Notes
Framingham	Framingham			junction with Mansfield-Fitchburg line
Framingham	North Framingham			
Sudbury	South Sudbury			
Sudbury	Sudbury			
Sudbury	North Sudbury			
Concord	Concord Junction			
Concord	Middlesex Junction			
Acton	Acton			
Acton	North Acton			Junction with Concord Railroad, Nashua Branch
Carlisle	Carlisle			
Chelmsford	South Chelmsford			
Chelmsford	Chelmsford			
Lowell	Lowell			Junction with Boston and Maine Railroad at Ayers City; Lowell (MBTA station) Commuter Rail stop located just north of former junction; historic Lowell B&M station was located further north on Dutton Street

== Boston and Providence Division ==
=== Boston to Providence ===
State	Location	Station	Mile (km)	Image	Notes
MA	Boston	Boston (Park Square)			Replaced by South Station in 1899
MA	Boston	Columbus Avenue			Crossing of Boston and Albany Railroad, now the site of Back Bay station
MA	Boston	Chickering			
MA	Boston	Roxbury			Now the site of Roxbury Crossing station
MA	Boston	Heath Street			Now the site of Jackson Square station
MA	Boston	Boylston			Now the site of Stony Brook station
MA	Boston	Jamaica Plain			Now the site of Green Street station
MA	Boston	Forest Hills			Junction with West Roxbury Branch
MA	Boston	Mount Hope			
MA	Boston	Clarendon Hills			
MA	Boston	Hazelwood			
MA	Boston	Hyde Park			Still an active station
MA	Boston	Readville			Junction with Midland Branch and Dedham Branch; still an active station
MA	Dedham	Green Lodge			Now the site of Route 128 station
MA	Canton	Canton Junction			Junction with Stoughton Branch; still an active station
MA	Sharon	Sharon			Still an active station
MA	Sharon	Sharon Heights			
MA	Foxborough	East Foxborough			
MA	Mansfield	Mansfield			Junction with Framingham and New Bedford lines; still an active station
MA	Mansfield	West Mansfield			
MA	Attleborough	Attleboro			Junction with Taunton and Attleborough branches; still an active station.
MA	Attleborough	Dodgeville			
MA	Attleborough	East Junction			Junction with East Junction Branch
MA	Attleborough	Hebronville			
RI	Central Falls	Central Falls			Junction with Providence and Worcester Railroad. Replaced by Pawtucket–Central Falls station in 1916.
RI	Pawtucket	Pawtucket			Replaced by Pawtucket–Central Falls station in 1916
RI	Pawtucket	Woodlawn			Junction with Moshassuck Valley Railroad
RI	Providence	Providence			Replaced by Providence station in 1986

=== Stoughton Branch ===
Location	Station	Mile (km)	Image	Notes
Canton	Canton Junction			junction with Boston and Providence main line
Canton	Canton			
Canton	Springdale			
Stoughton	West Stoughton			
Stoughton	Stoughton Central			
Stoughton	Junction with Mayflower Park-Fall River main line			

=== West Roxbury to Attleborough ===
Location	Station	Mile (km)	Image	Notes
Boston	Forest Hills			Junction with Boston–Providence mainline; still an active station
Boston	Roslindale			Still an active station
Boston	Bellevue			Still an active station
Boston	Highland			Still an active station
Boston	West Roxbury			Still an active station. Junction with Needham Cutoff after 1907.
Boston	Spring Street			
Dedham	Dedham			junction with Dedham-Readville Branch
Westwood	Islington			Junction with New York and New England Railroad; still an active station
Norwood	Ellis			
Norwood	Norwood			Still an active station
Norwood	Norwood Central			Still an active station
Norwood	Winslow			Junction with Wrentham Branch (New York and New England Railroad)
Walpole	Cedar Junction			junction with Mansfield-Framingham line
Norfolk	Pondville			
Wrentham	Wrentham			
Wrentham	Wampum			
Plainville	Plainville			
North Attleborough	North Attleborough			After 1903, junction with line to Valley Falls.
North Attleborough	Chestnut Street			
North Attleborough	Falls Village			
Attleborough	Farmers			
Attleborough	Attleborough			Junction with Boston–Providence mainline (Attleboro Branch)

=== East Junction Branch ===
Location	Station	Mile (km)	Image	Notes
Attleborough	East Junction			Junction with Boston–Providence mainline
Seekonk	Perrins			
Seekonk	Perrins Bridge			
East Providence	Rumford			
East Providence	Junction with East Providence Branch			
East Providence	East Providence			
East Providence	Junction with Providence-Bristol line			Original junction was at the east end of India Point Railroad Bridge. In 1908, it was moved north to the Crook Point Bascule Bridge when the East Side Railroad Tunnel was opened.
Providence	Fox Point			

== Providence, Warren and Bristol ==
=== Providence to Bristol ===
Location	Station	Mile (km)	Image	Notes
Providence	Providence / Fox Point			Relocated to Providence Union Station with the opening of the East Side Railroad Tunnel in 1908.
East Providence	Junction with East Junction Branch			Junction with East Providence Branch and East Junction Branch. Junction relocated north to Crook Point Bascule Bridge in 1908.
East Providence	East Providence			
East Providence	Kettle Point			
East Providence	Squantum			
East Providence	Silver Spring			
East Providence	Union Club			
East Providence	Pomham Club			
East Providence	Riverside			
East Providence	Bullocks Point			
Barrington	Drownsville			
Barrington	West Barrington			
Barrington	Nayatt			
Barrington	Barrington			
Barrington	Hampden Meadows			
Warren	North Warren			
Warren	Warren			Junction with Warren-Fall River branch
Warren	South Warren			
Bristol	Beach Terrace			
Bristol	Bristol Highlands			
Bristol	Poppasquash Road			
Bristol	Bristol			

=== Warren to Fall River ===
Location	Station	Mile (km)	Image	Notes
Warren	Warren			junction with Providence-Bristol line
Warren	East Warren			
Swansea	Touisset			
Swansea	Ocean Grove			
Swansea	South Swansea			
Somerset	Brayton Point			
Somerset	Brayton Wharf			Original terminal of the line; became a short spur when the line was extended to Fall River
Somerset	Brayton			
Fall River	Fall River			Junction with Fall River main line
