= South Chatham station =

South Chatham
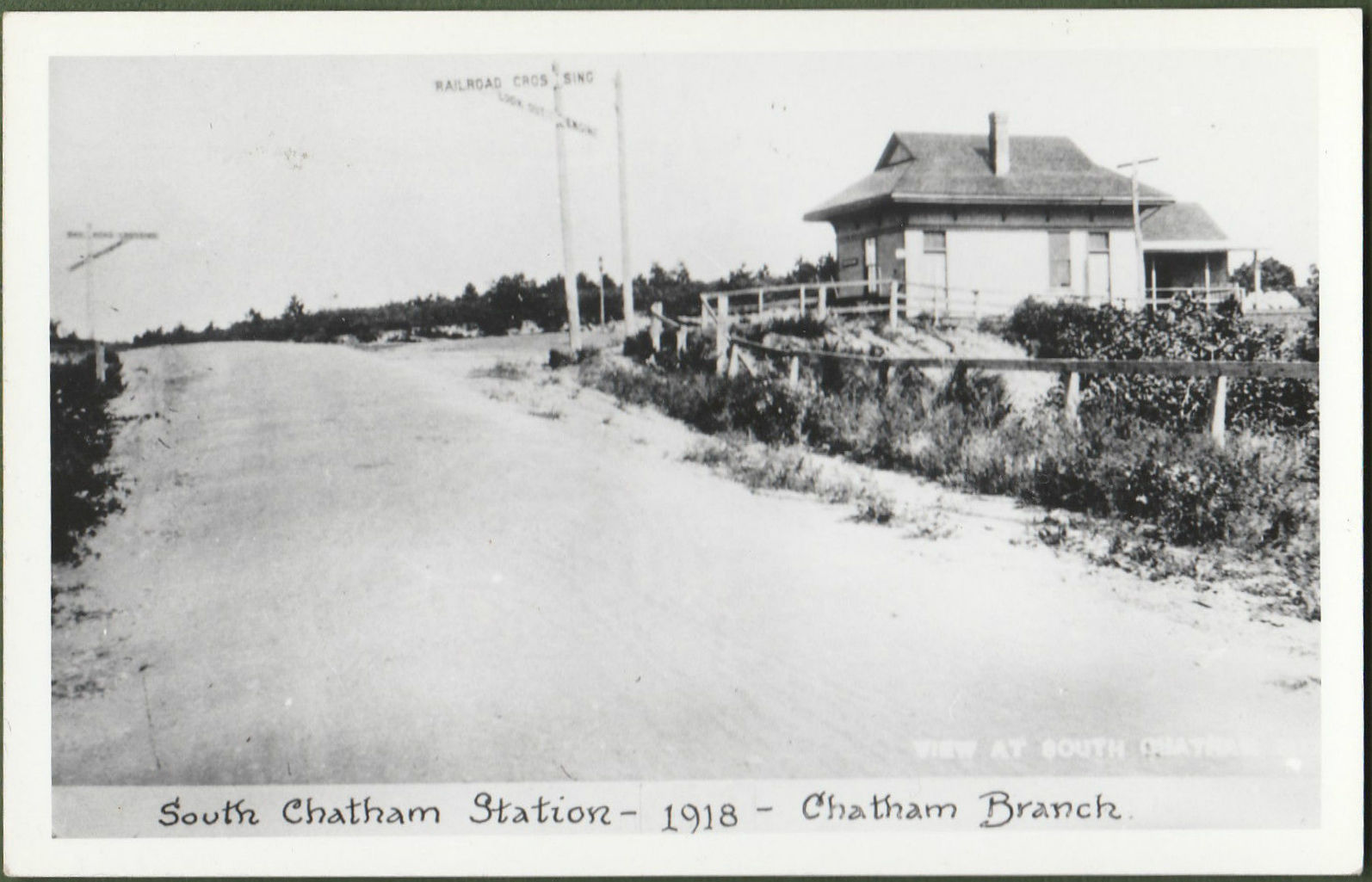
- South Chatham station on a 1918 postcard

General information
- Location: Meetinghouse Road, South Chatham, Massachusetts
- Coordinates: 41°41′2.50″N 70°1′9.36″W
- Line: Chatham Branch

History
- Opened: 1887

Former services
Preceding station	New York, New Haven and Hartford Railroad	Following station
South Harwich toward Harwich	Chatham Branch	West Chatham toward Chatham
Location

South Chatham station was a train station located in South Chatham, Massachusetts. Built in 1887, it was a small wooden structure with a trackside bay window.

The Chatham Railroad opened between Harwich and Chatham on November 21, 1887. It was immediately leased by the Old Colony Railroad, which controlled all rail lines on Cape Cod, as its Chatham Branch. The Old Colony was leased by the New York, New Haven and Hartford Railroad in 1893.

Passenger service on the Chatham Branch ended in 1931; it was the first line on Cape Cod to lose service. Freight service continued until the line was abandoned in 1937. The stations were sold to private individuals; all but Chatham were eventually demolished.
