= Truro station =

Truro station may refer to:

- Truro railway station, in Truro, Cornwall, England
- Truro railway station, South Australia, a former station in Truro, South Australia
- Truro station (Massachusetts), a former station in Truro, Massachusetts, United States
  - North Truro station, a former station in North Truro, Massachusetts, United States
  - South Truro station, a former station in Truro, Massachusetts, United States
- Truro station (Nova Scotia), in Truro, Nova Scotia, Canada

== See also ==
- Truro (disambiguation)
