= South Weymouth =

South Weymouth may refer to:

- South Weymouth (MBTA station) in Weymouth, Massachusetts
- Naval Air Station South Weymouth, an airfield near Weymouth, Massachusetts
