= Harwich railway station =

Harwich railway station may refer to:

- Harwich International railway station, in Parkeston, Essex, United Kingdom
- Harwich Town railway station, in Harwich, Essex, United Kingdom
- Harwich station (Massachusetts), in Harwich, Massachusetts
