= Harwich Center station =

Harwich Center
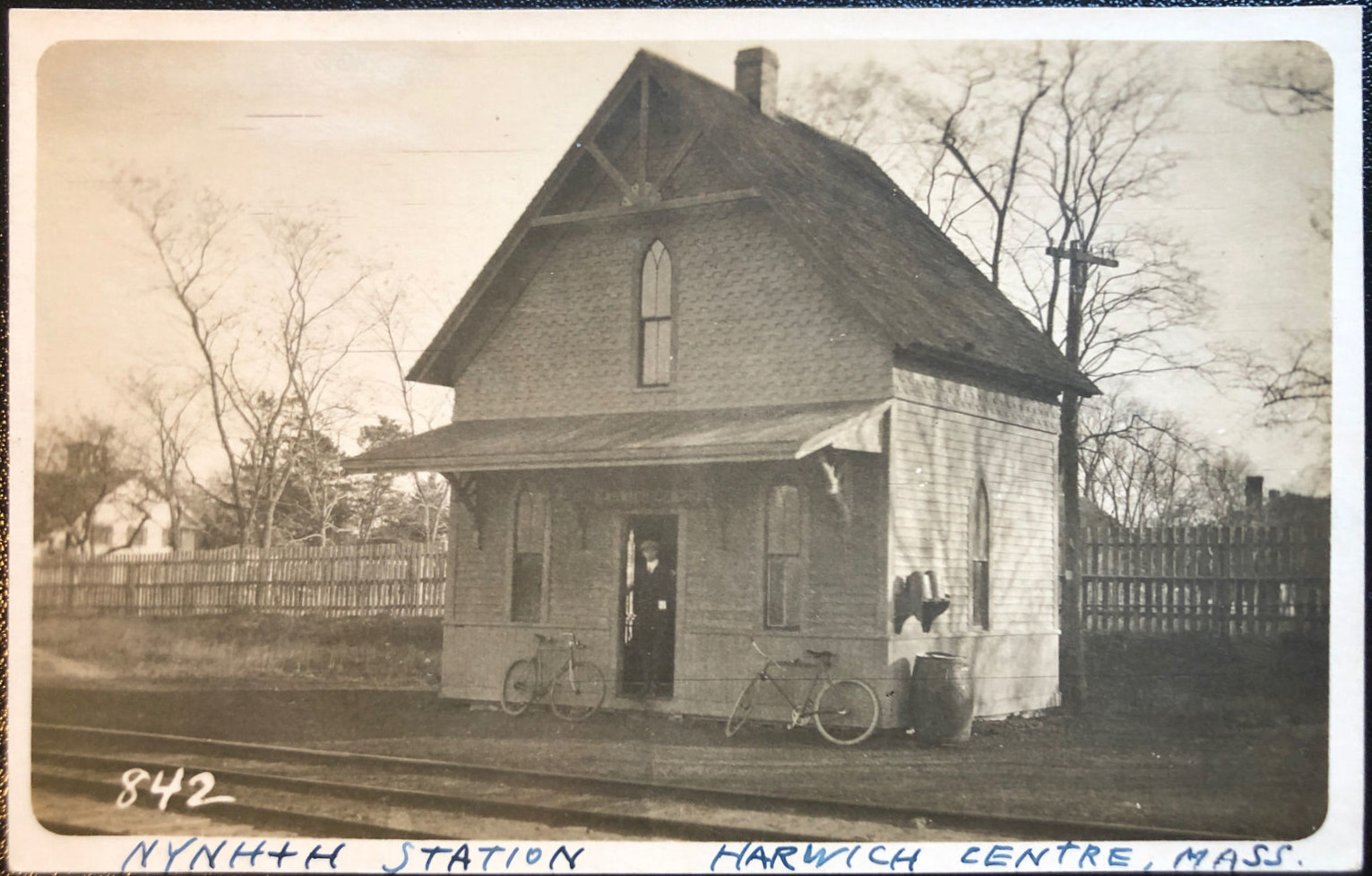
- 1916 postcard of Harwich Center station

General information
- Location: Harwich, Massachusetts
- Coordinates: 41°41′14.8″N 70°04′28.9″W
- Line: Chatham Branch

History
- Opened: 1887

Former services
Preceding station	New York, New Haven and Hartford Railroad	Following station
Harwich Terminus	Chatham Branch	South Harwich toward Chatham
Location

Harwich Center station was a train station located in Harwich, Massachusetts. Built in 1887, it was a small 1 1/2-story wooden structure with a pointed roof.

The Chatham Railroad opened between Harwich and Chatham on November 21, 1887. It was immediately leased by the Old Colony Railroad, which controlled all rail lines on Cape Cod, as its Chatham Branch. The Old Colony was leased by the New York, New Haven and Hartford Railroad in 1893.

Passenger service on the Chatham Branch ended in 1931; it was the first line on Cape Cod to lose service. Freight service on the line continued until it was abandoned in 1937, though Harwich Center station was no longer in use by 1937. The stations were sold to private individuals; all but Chatham were eventually demolished.
