= Truro (disambiguation) =

Truro is the county town of Cornwall.

Truro may also refer to:

== Places ==
- Truro, South Australia
- Truro, Nova Scotia, Canada
- Truro (UK Parliament constituency), Cornwall, England

=== United States ===
- Truro, Illinois
- Truro Township, Knox County, Illinois
- Truro, Iowa
- Truro, Massachusetts
- Truro Township, Franklin County, Ohio
- Truro Parish, Virginia
  - Truro Church (Fairfax, Virginia)

== Transportation ==
- HMCS Truro, a Royal Canadian Navy minesweeper
- Truro (ship), a ship that carried the first batch of indentured Indian labourers to South Africa
- HMS Truro (1919), British Royal Navy minesweeper
- GWR 3700 Class 3440 City of Truro, a Great Western Railway 4-4-0 steam locomotive, is claimed to be the first locomotive to have exceeded 100 MPH
- Truro, a West Cornwall Railway locomotive

== Other uses ==
- Baron Truro, a title in the Peerage of the United Kingdom
  - Thomas Wilde, 3rd Baron Truro (1856–1899), English first-class cricketer and barrister
  - Thomas Wilde, 1st Baron Truro (1783–1855), English jurist and Lord Chancellor
- Truro murders, a series of murders in South Australia named after the town near where the remains of the victims were dumped
- A fictional Florida town in the 1980s TV series Flamingo Road

== See also ==
- Truro station (disambiguation)
