= North Abington station =

North Abington
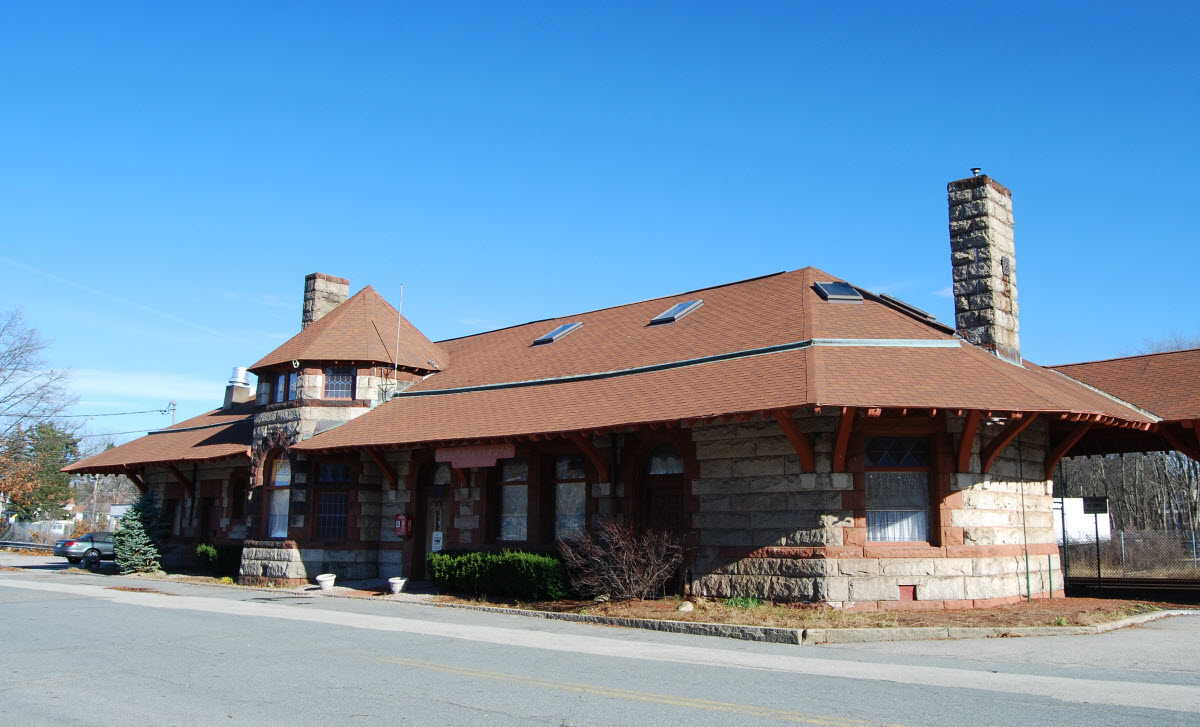

General information
- Location: 10 Railroad Street, Abington, Massachusetts
- Coordinates: 42°7′45″N 70°56′32″W

History
- Closed: June 30, 1959

Former services
Preceding station	New York, New Haven and Hartford Railroad	Following station
South Weymouth toward Boston	Boston–Plymouth	Abington toward Plymouth
- North Abington Depot
- U.S. National Register of Historic Places
- Built: 1894
- Architect: Bradford Gilbert
- Architectural style: Romanesque
- NRHP reference No.: 76001612
- Added to NRHP: May 13, 1976
Location

North Abington station is a former railroad station in North Abington, Massachusetts. It is located across from the intersection of Harrison Avenue and Railroad Street, along what is today the Massachusetts Bay Transportation Authority's Plymouth/Kingston Line, and is now home to the Abington Depot restaurant.

== History ==
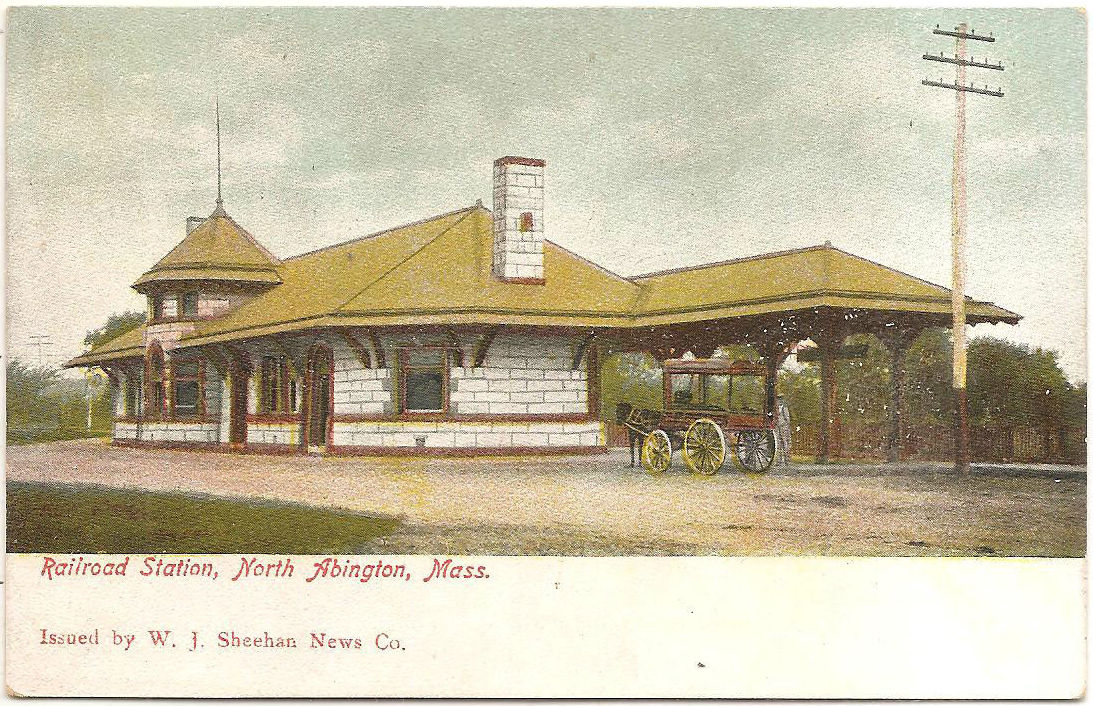
Early-20th-century postcard of the station

The single-story Richardsonian Romanesque granite-and-brownstone building was designed by Bradford Lee Gilbert and built in 1893 by the New York, New Haven and Hartford Railroad (NYNH&H). Construction on the building was begun immediately following the "North Abington Riot", in which railroad laborers and local townspeople fought over the town's right to allow a grade-level streetcar crossing over the NYNH&H track. The legal case over this issue set a precedent in state legal jurisprudence that a single Massachusetts Supreme Judicial Court justice was sufficient to render binding interpretations of the law.

The building was listed on the National Register of Historic Places in 1976 as North Abington Depot.

== See also ==
- Abington station, in Abington
- National Register of Historic Places listings in Plymouth County, Massachusetts
