= Pleasant Lake station (Massachusetts) =

Former train station in Harwich, Massachusetts

Pleasant Lake
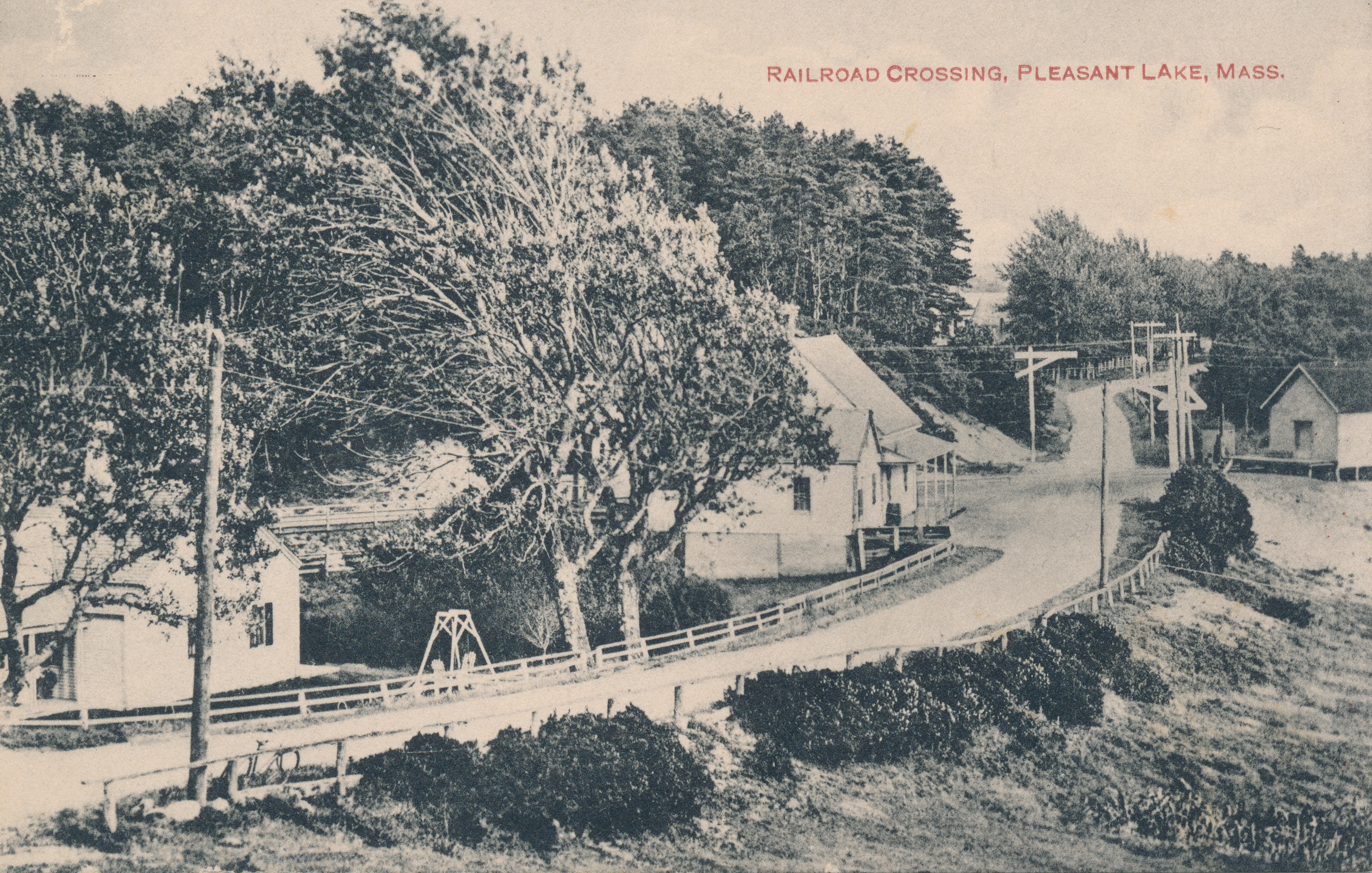
- Circa-1910 postcard of the station area

General information
- Location: 403 Pleasant Lake Avenue, Harwich, Massachusetts
- Coordinates: 41.71293°N 70.08212°W
- Line: Cape Cod Railroad

Former services
Preceding station	New York, New Haven and Hartford Railroad	Following station
Harwich toward Boston	Boston–Provincetown	Brewster toward Provincetown
Location

Pleasant Lake station is a former train station located in Harwich, Massachusetts on Cape Cod. The station building has been repurposed as the Pleasant Lake General Store.
