= Abington station =

Railway station in Abington, Massachusetts

Abington
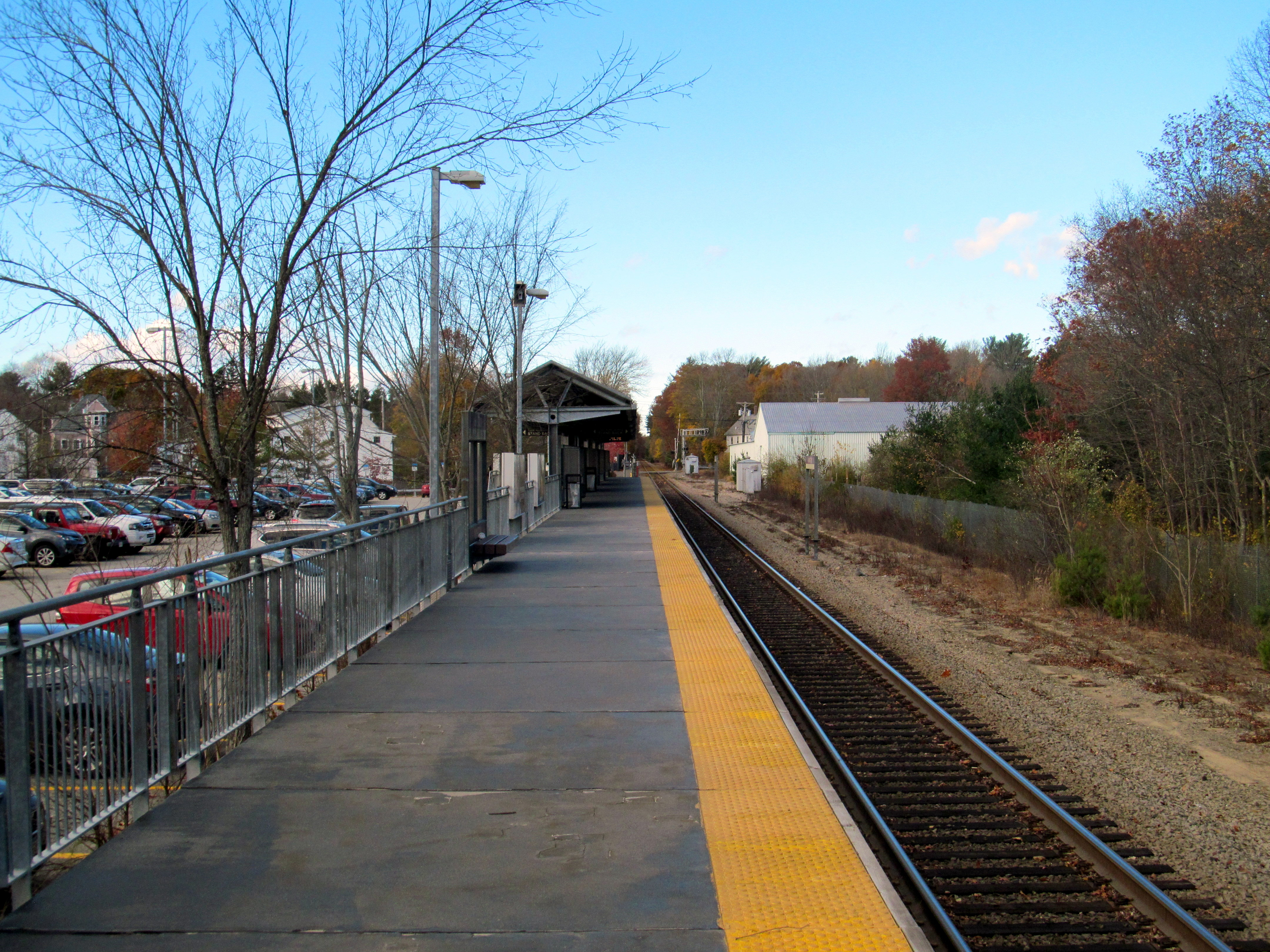
- Abington station platform in November 2016

General information
- Location: 231 Centre Avenue (Route 123); Abington, Massachusetts
- Coordinates: 42.1071°N 70.9345°W
- Line: Plymouth Branch
- Platforms: 1 side platform
- Tracks: 1

Construction
- Parking: 405 spaces ($4.00 fee)
- Cycle facilities: 8 spaces
- Accessible: Yes

Other information
- Fare zone: 4

History
- Opened: 1845; September 29, 1997
- Closed: June 30, 1959 (former station)

Passengers
- 2024: 376 daily boardings

Services
Preceding station	MBTA	Following station
South Weymouth toward South Station	Kingston Line	Whitman toward Kingston
Former services
Preceding station	New York, New Haven and Hartford Railroad	Following station
North Abington toward Boston	Boston–Plymouth	Whitman toward Plymouth
Location

Abington station is an MBTA Commuter Rail station in Abington, Massachusetts. It serves the Plymouth/Kingston Line, and is located off Center Avenue (Route 123). It serves as a park and ride stop for the towns of Abington, Rockland, and Hanover.

== History ==
The Old Colony Railroad opened through Abington in November 1845. Construction of a new brick station building began in 1887 and was completed around August 1888. Passenger service on the line ended on June 30, 1959, after the completion of the Southeast Expressway.

The modern station opened along with the rest of the Plymouth/Kingston Line on September 29, 1997.
