= Camp station =

Camp
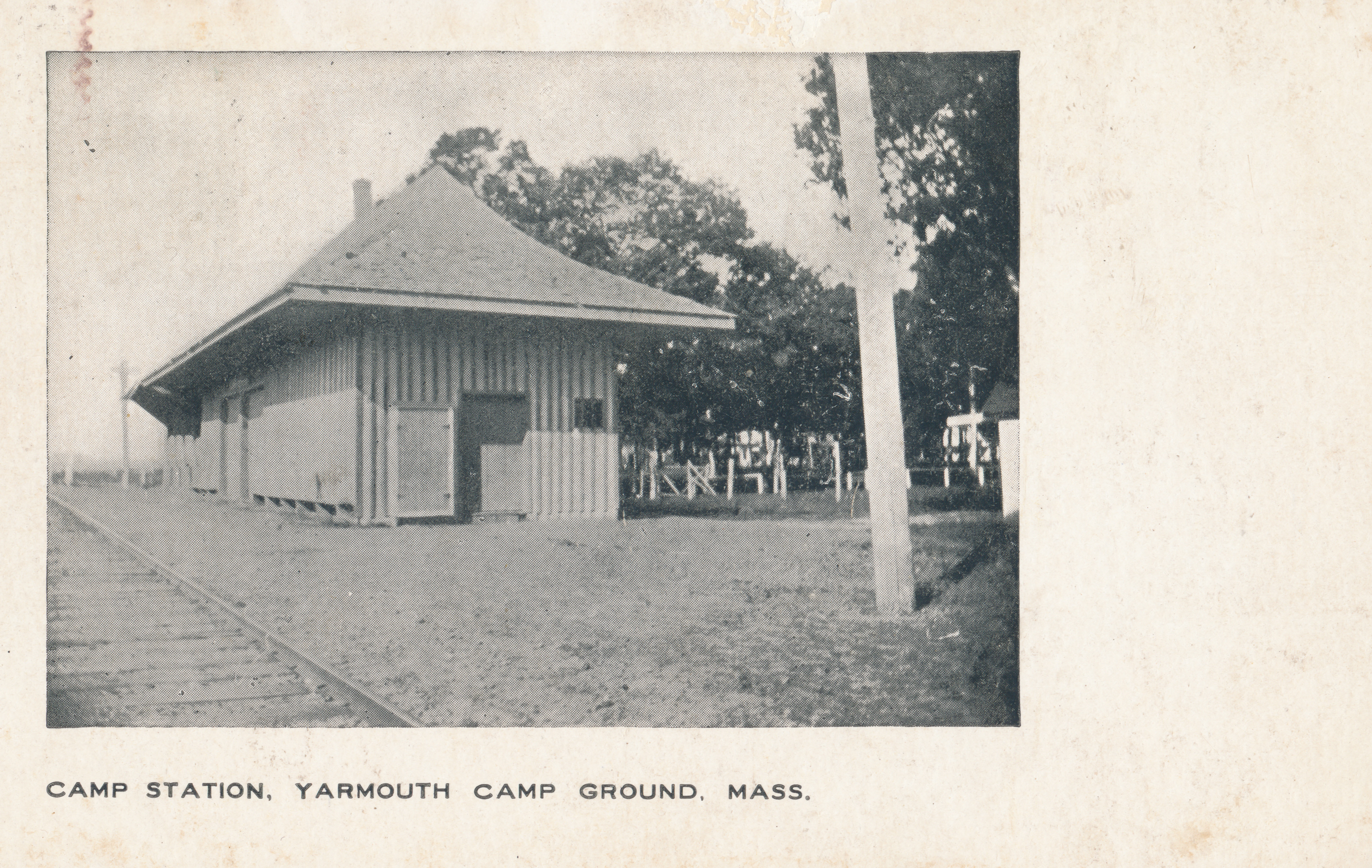
- View of the station, ca. 1913

General information
- Location: Willow Street; Yarmouth, Massachusetts; United States
- Coordinates: 41°40′56″N 70°15′36″W
- Line: Cape Main Line

History
- Opened: 1863
- Closed: 1920s

Former services
Preceding station	New York, New Haven and Hartford Railroad	Following station
Yarmouth toward Boston	Boston–Hyannis	Hyannis Terminus
Location

Camp station was located on Willow Street in Yarmouth, Massachusetts, on Cape Cod. It was used during the summer months as a stop for the adjacent Yarmouth Camp Ground. The wooden board-and-batten station was built in 1863. To accommodate high ridership, the platform was extended by 240 feet (73 m) in 1866. The disused station building was sold in 1925 and reused as a cottage in Dennisport.
