= Eastham station =

Eastham
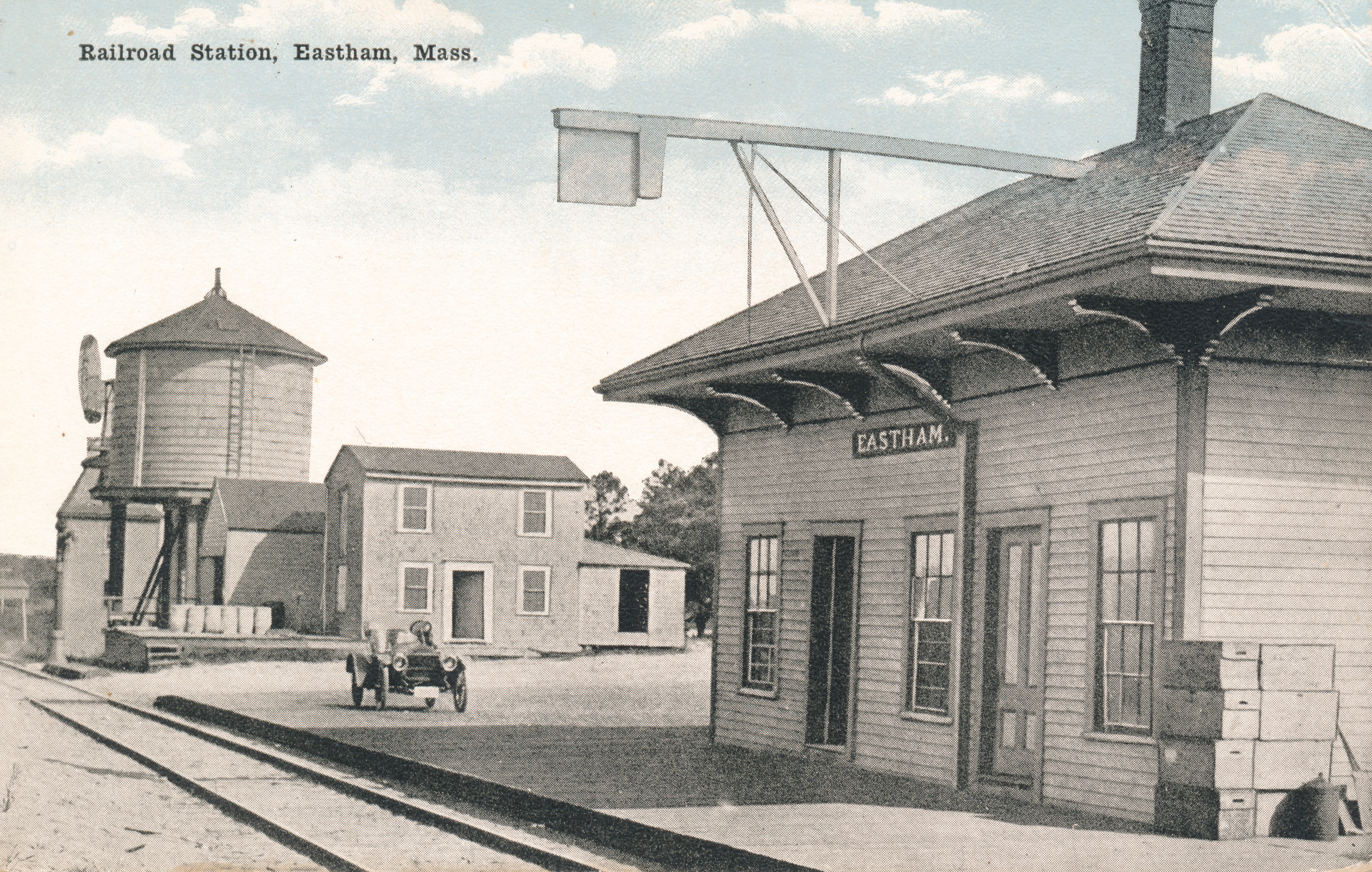
- Early-20th-century postcard of Eastham station

General information
- Location: Samoset Road Eastham, Massachusetts; USA
- Coordinates: 41°49′47″N 69°58′54″W

History
- Opened: December 28, 1870
- Closed: 1941

Former services
Preceding station	New York, New Haven and Hartford Railroad	Following station
Orleans toward Boston	Boston–Provincetown	North Eastham toward Provincetown
Location

Eastham station was a train station in Eastham, Massachusetts. It was built by the Old Colony Railroad around 1870 when the rail line was extended from Orleans to Wellfleet. Passenger service to this station ended in 1941 when the New Haven Railroad discontinued scheduled service between Yarmouth and Provincetown.
