= Wellfleet station =

Railway station in Wellfleet, United States of America

Wellfleet
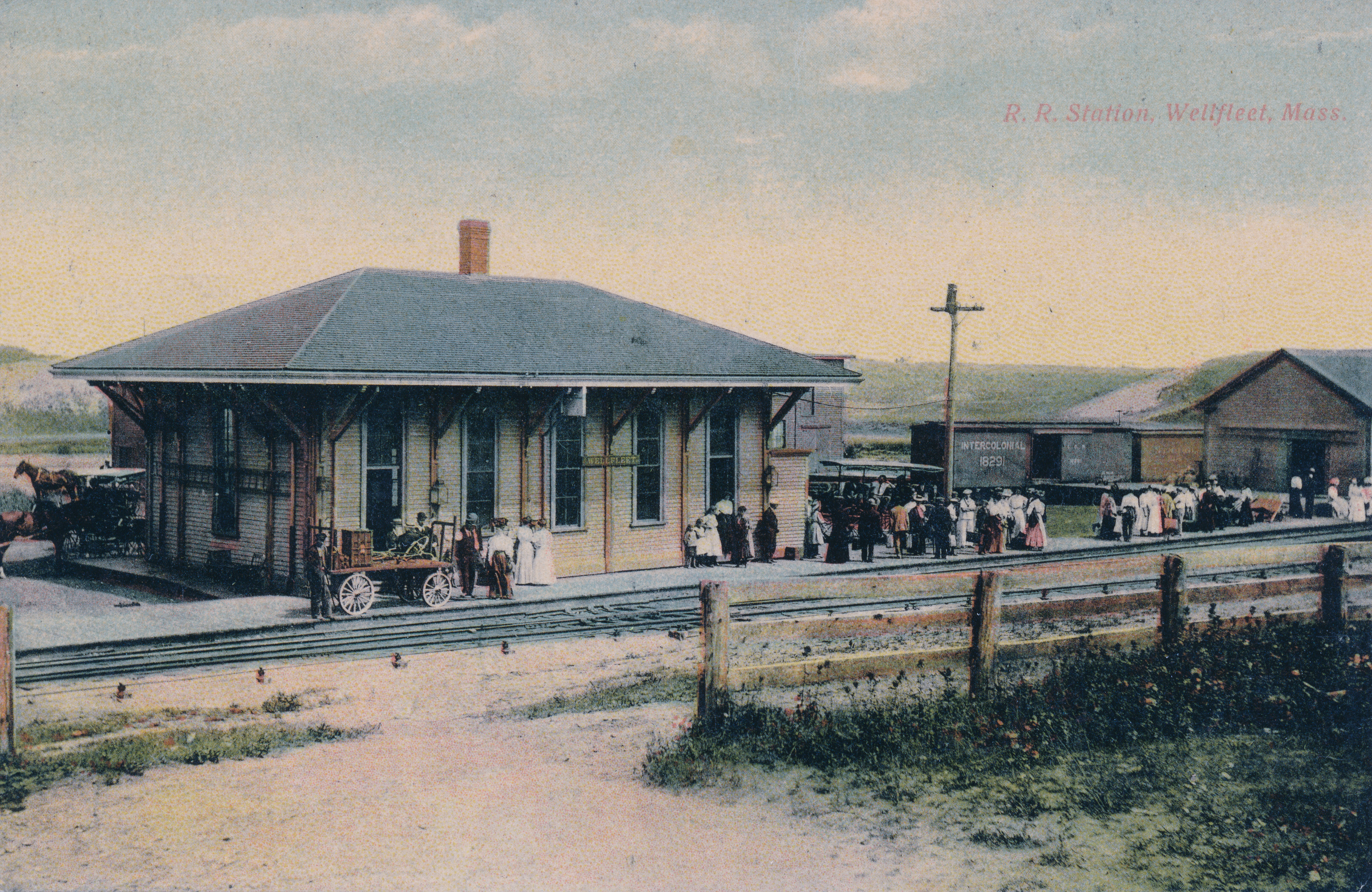
- Wellfleet station around 1909

General information
- Location: Railroad Avenue at Commercial Street; Wellfleet, Massachusetts
- Coordinates: 41°56′4.53″N 70°1′46.53″W
- Line: Cape Cod Railroad

History
- Opened: 1870

Former services
| Preceding station | New York, New Haven and Hartford Railroad | Following station |
|---|---|---|
| South Wellfleet toward Boston | Boston–Provincetown | South Truro toward Provincetown |
Location

Wellfleet station was a train station located just to the east of the intersection of Commercial Street and Railroad Avenue in Wellfleet, Massachusetts. It was constructed in 1870 when the Cape Cod Railroad reached Wellfleet.
