= Brewster station (Massachusetts) =

Brewster
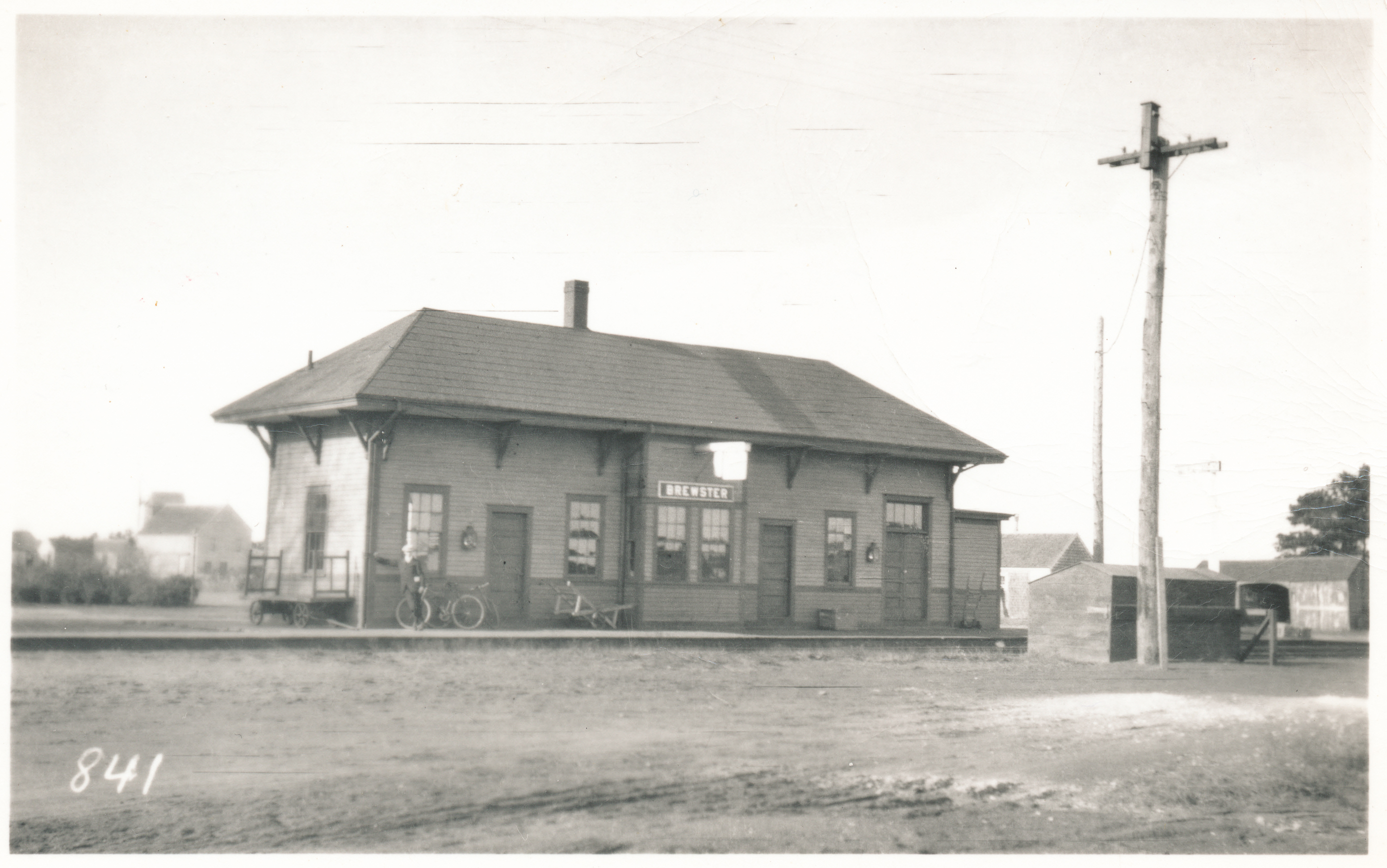
- Brewster station in the 1920s

General information
- Location: Depot Street at Long Pond Road; Brewster, Massachusetts
- Coordinates: 41.75196°N 70.07139°W
- Line: Cape Cod Railroad

History
- Closed: ca. 1930s

Former services
Preceding station	New York, New Haven and Hartford Railroad	Following station
Pleasant Lake toward Boston	Boston–Provincetown	East Brewster toward Provincetown
Location

Brewster station was a train station located at the corner of Route 137 and Underpass Road in Brewster, Massachusetts. The station was torn down before World War II.
