= North Harwich station =

Train station in Massachusetts, USA

North Harwich
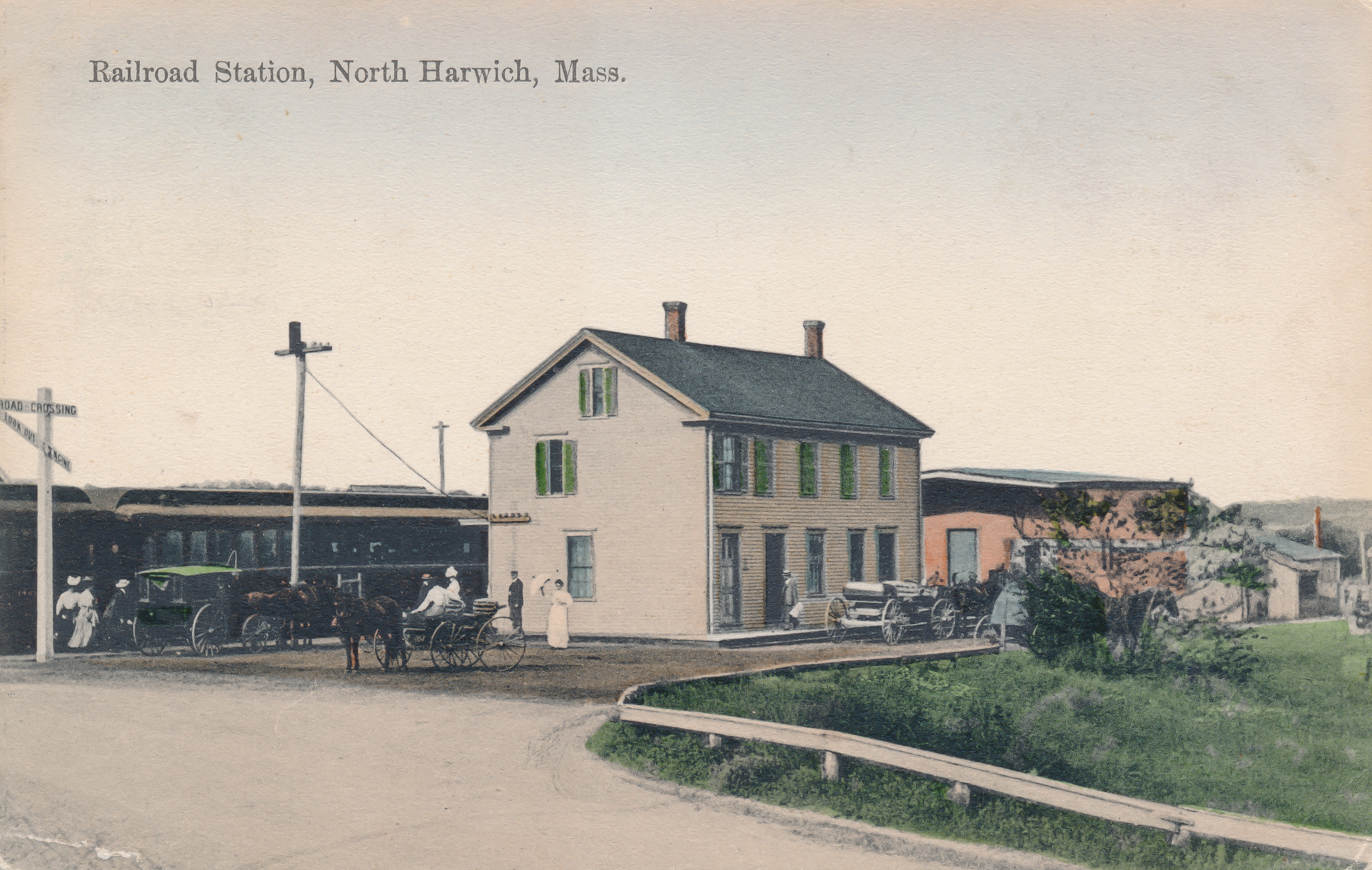
- North Harwich station around 1911

General information
- Location: Depot Road; North Harwich, Massachusetts
- Coordinates: 41.68821°N 70.12652°W
- Line: Cape Cod Railroad

Former services
| Preceding station | New York, New Haven and Hartford Railroad | Following station |
|---|---|---|
| South Dennis toward Boston | Boston–Provincetown | Harwich toward Provincetown |
Location

North Harwich station was located in North Harwich, Massachusetts on Cape Cod. A new station building was constructed in 1877.
