= South Dennis station =

South Dennis
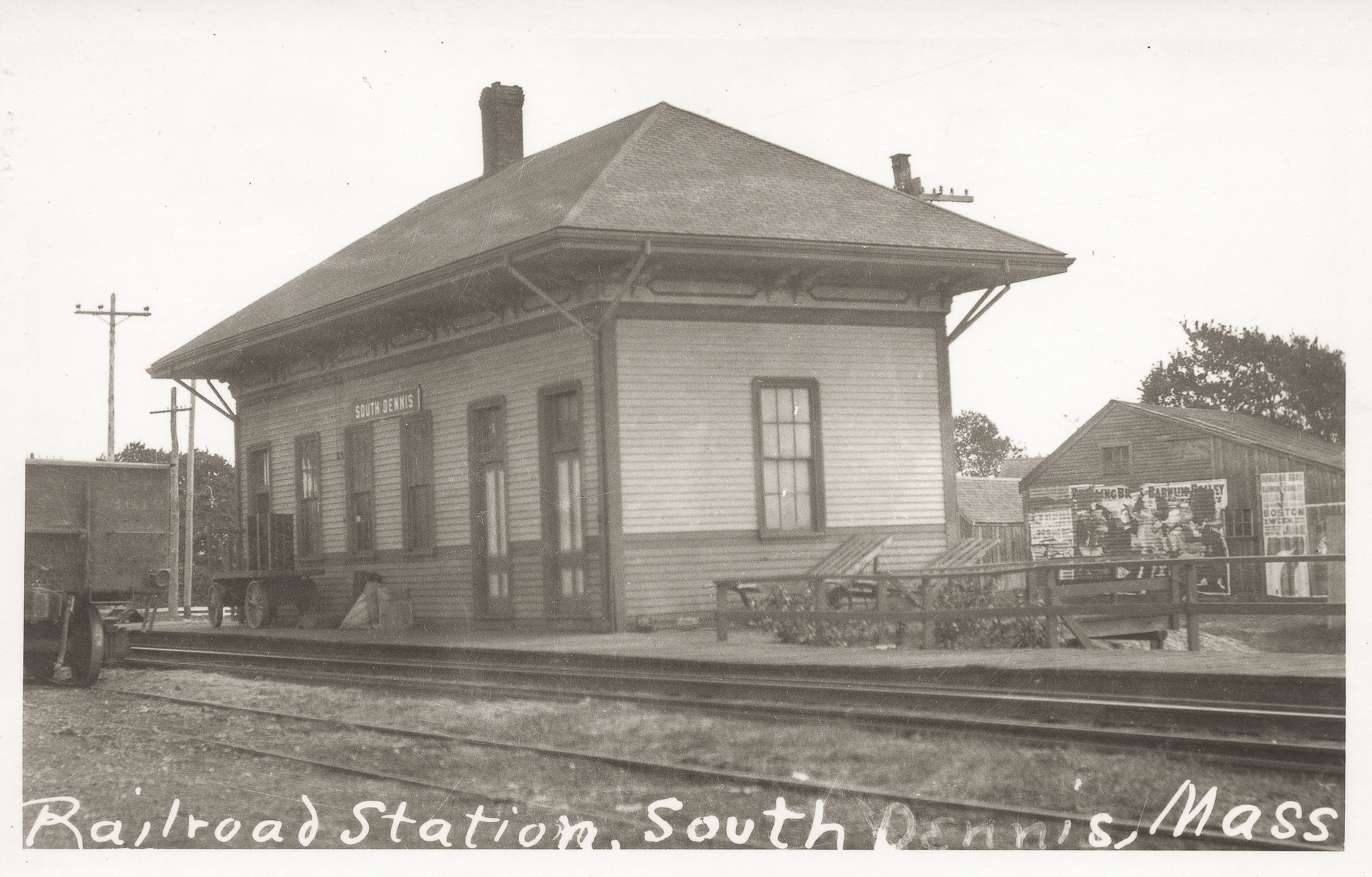
- South Dennis station around 1930

General information
- Location: Great Western Road, South Dennis
- Coordinates: 41°41′19.30″N 70°8′13.88″W
- Line: Cape Cod Railroad
- Platforms: Yes

History
- Opened: 1850s
- Rebuilt: 1873

Former services
| Preceding station | New York, New Haven and Hartford Railroad | Following station |
|---|---|---|
| Bass River toward Boston | Boston–Provincetown | North Harwich toward Provincetown |
Location

South Dennis station was a railway station located on the Great Western Road in South Dennis, Massachusetts. A new station building was constructed in 1873. The station was torn down after passenger rail service to the Outer Cape ended in 1940.
