= South Truro station =

South Truro
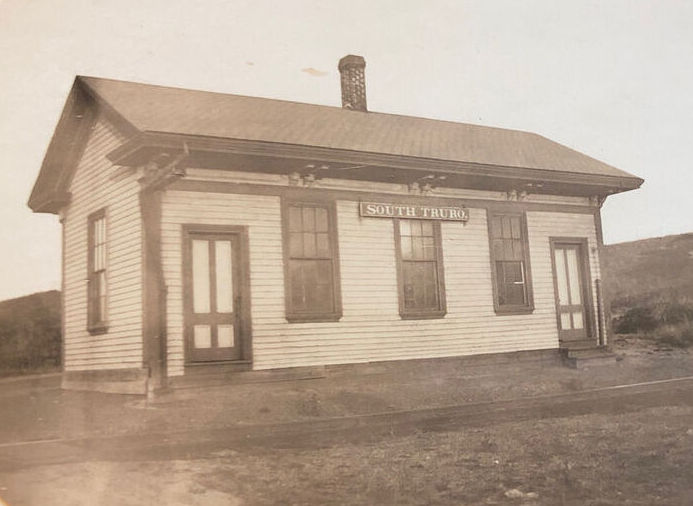
- South Truro station in October 1931

General information
- Location: Ryder Beach Road near Old County Road; Truro, Massachusetts
- Coordinates: 41.963797°N 70.065807°W

History
- Opened: July 23, 1873
- Closed: July 17, 1938

Former services
| Preceding station | New York, New Haven and Hartford Railroad | Following station |
|---|---|---|
| Wellfleet toward Boston | Boston–Provincetown | Truro toward Provincetown |
Location

South Truro station was a train station located in the southern part of Truro, Massachusetts. The first passenger service was on July 23, 1873.

Passenger service through Truro to Provincetown ended in July 1938, but freight service survived until 1960, when the tracks above North Eastham were abandoned.
