= Harwich station (Massachusetts) =

Harwich
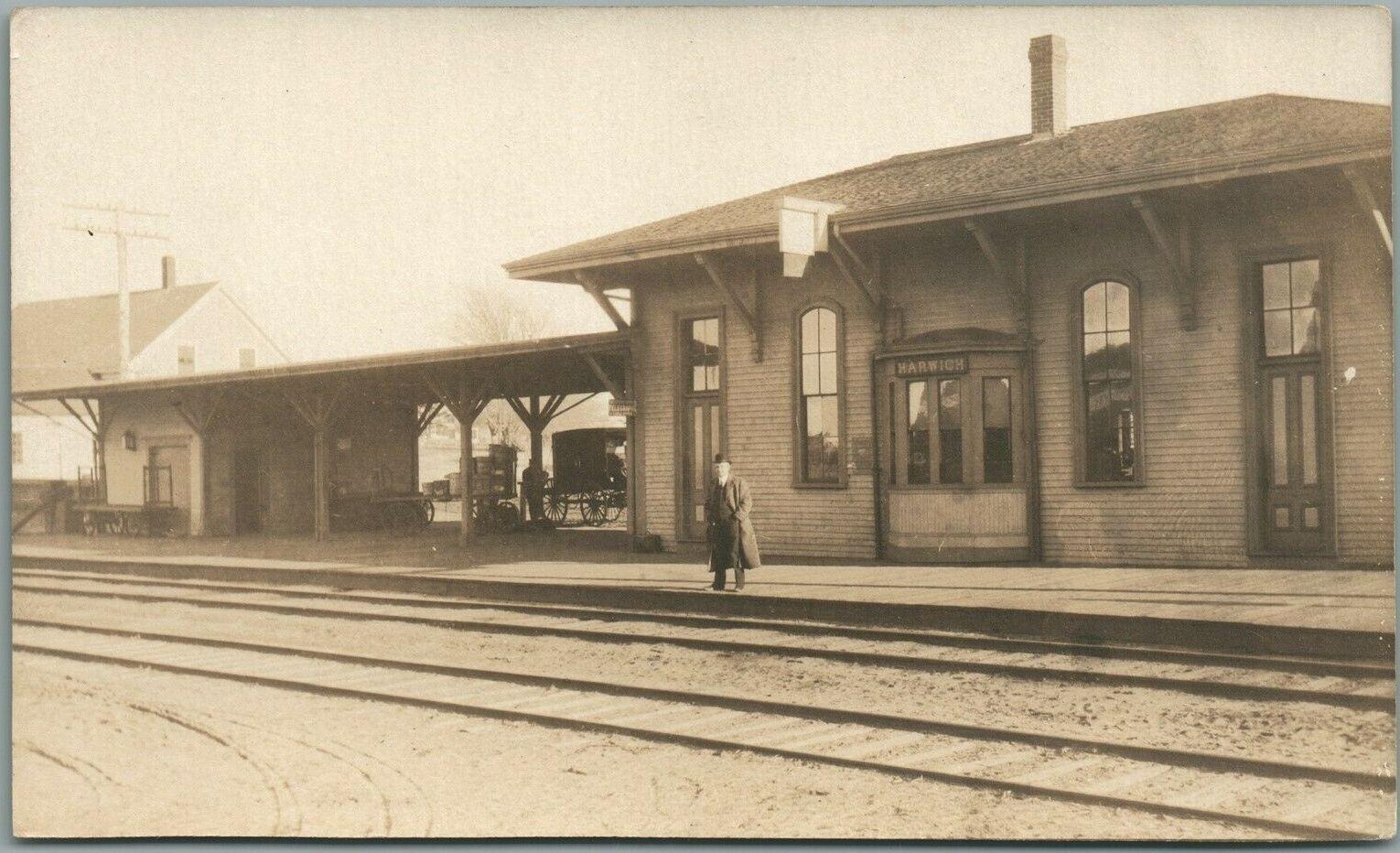
- Harwich station on an early-20th-century postcard

General information
- Location: Depot Road; Harwich, Massachusetts
- Coordinates: 41°41′15.16″N 70°5′29.08″W
- Lines: Cape Main Line, Chatham Branch

Former services
Preceding station	New York, New Haven and Hartford Railroad	Following station
North Harwich toward Boston	Boston–Provincetown	Pleasant Lake toward Provincetown
Terminus	Chatham Branch	Harwich Center toward Chatham
Location

Harwich station was a railway station located in Harwich, Massachusetts. It opened in 1865 and closed in 1940. The station was the junction between the Cape Cod Railroad mainline and the Chatham Branch.

== History ==
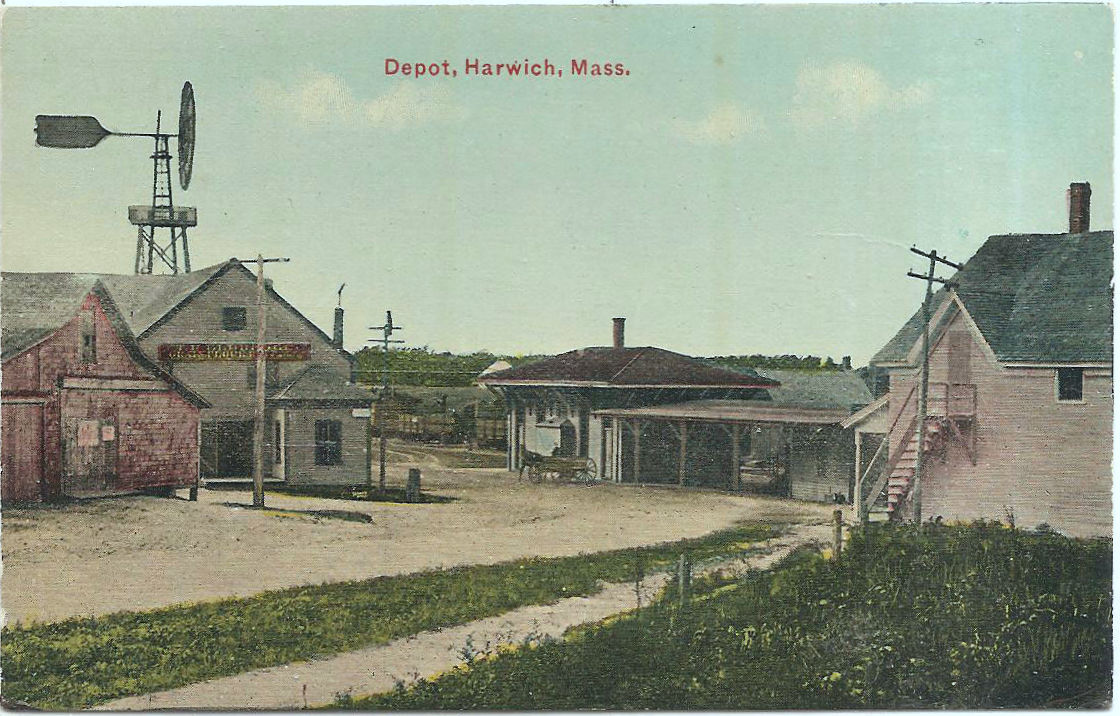
Early-20th-century postcard of the station

The Cape Cod Central Railroad opened between Yarmouth and Orleans in December 1865. Harwich was among the initial stations on the line. The Cape Cod Central merged in 1868 into the Cape Cod Railroad, which in turn became part of the Old Colony Railroad in 1872. A nearby building was purchased in 1878 for use as a freight house.

The Chatham Railroad opened between Harwich and Chatham on November 21, 1887. It was immediately leased by the Old Colony Railroad, which controlled all rail lines on Cape Cod, as its Chatham Branch. The Old Colony was leased by the New York, New Haven and Hartford Railroad in 1893. A turntable, wye, and water tower were located at Harwich; a new freight house was built adjacent to the station in the 1890s.

Passenger service on the Chatham Branch ended in 1931. Freight service continued until the line was abandoned in 1937. All passenger service between Yarmouth and Provincetown ended in 1938 due to the 88 stations case; it resumed only for the 1940 summer season. Freight service on the portion of the line between South Dennis and North Eastham, including Harwich, ended on September 5, 1965, and the line was abandoned.

The mainline was converted to the Cape Cod Rail Trail, while the Chatham Branch became the Old Colony Rail Trail. The junction between the trails is near the site of the former station, which is no longer extant.
