= Orleans station (Massachusetts) =

Orleans
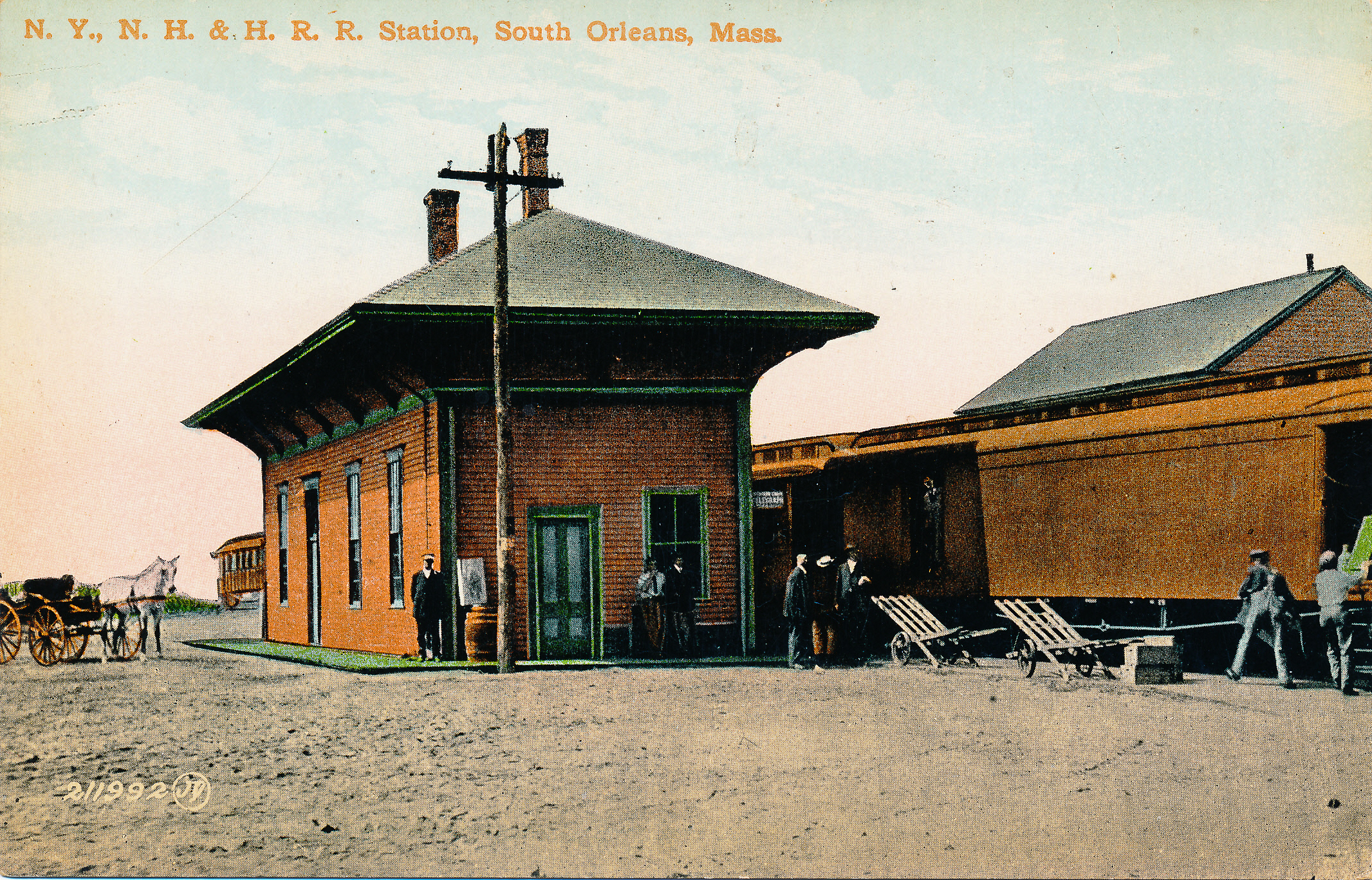
- Postcard of Orleans station in the early 1900s

General information
- Location: Main Street, Orleans, Massachusetts; United States
- Coordinates: 41°47′19.51″N 69°59′34.56″W
- Line: Cape Main Line

History
- Opened: 1865
- Closed: 1941

Former services
Preceding station	New York, New Haven and Hartford Railroad	Following station
East Brewster toward Boston	Boston–Provincetown	Eastham toward Provincetown
Location

Orleans station was a train station in Orleans, Massachusetts. It was built by the Old Colony Railroad in 1865 when the rail line was extended from Yarmouth to Orleans. The original station was replaced by a newer station around 1890. Passenger service to this station ended in the late 1930s when the New Haven Railroad discontinued scheduled service between Yarmouth and Provincetown.
