= Truro station (Massachusetts) =

Truro
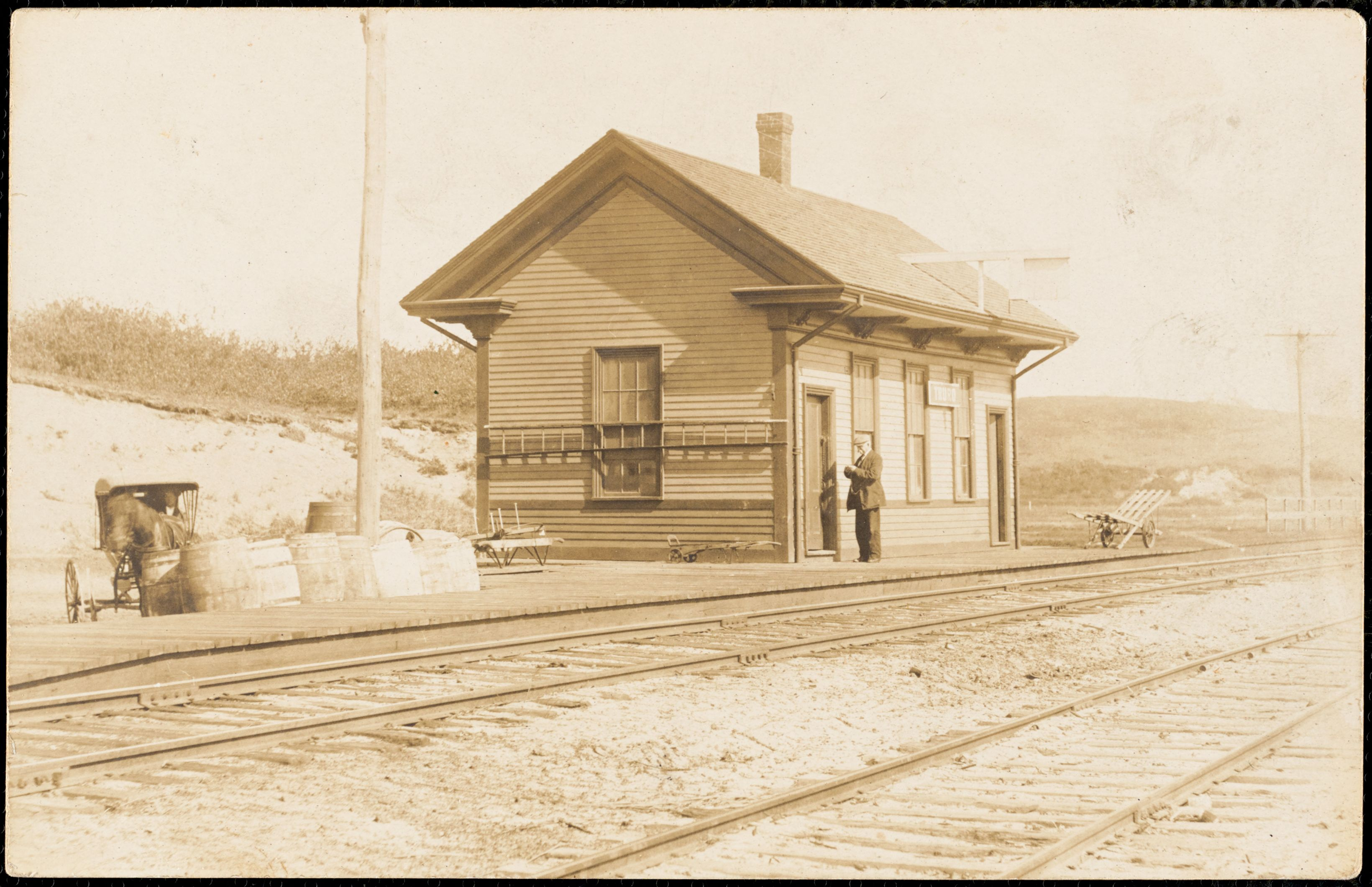
- Truro station on a 1907 postcard

General information
- Location: Depot Road, Truro, Massachusetts
- Coordinates: 41°59′30.13″N 70°04′17.49″W
- Line: Cape Main Line

History
- Opened: 1873

Former services
Preceding station	New York, New Haven and Hartford Railroad	Following station
South Truro toward Boston	Boston–Provincetown	Corn Hill toward Provincetown
Location

Truro station was a train station located in Truro, Massachusetts at the west end of Depot Road.

== History ==
The station was located on a peninsula in Pamet Harbor, with embankments and bridges crossing inlets both north and south of the station. Tracks on both sides were washed out in the "Christmas Blizzard" of 1909, interrupting rail service to Provincetown for days.

The station was razed when the tracks between Eastham and Provincetown were removed during the early 1960s.
