= South Weymouth station =

Commuter rail station in Weymouth, Massachusetts

South Weymouth
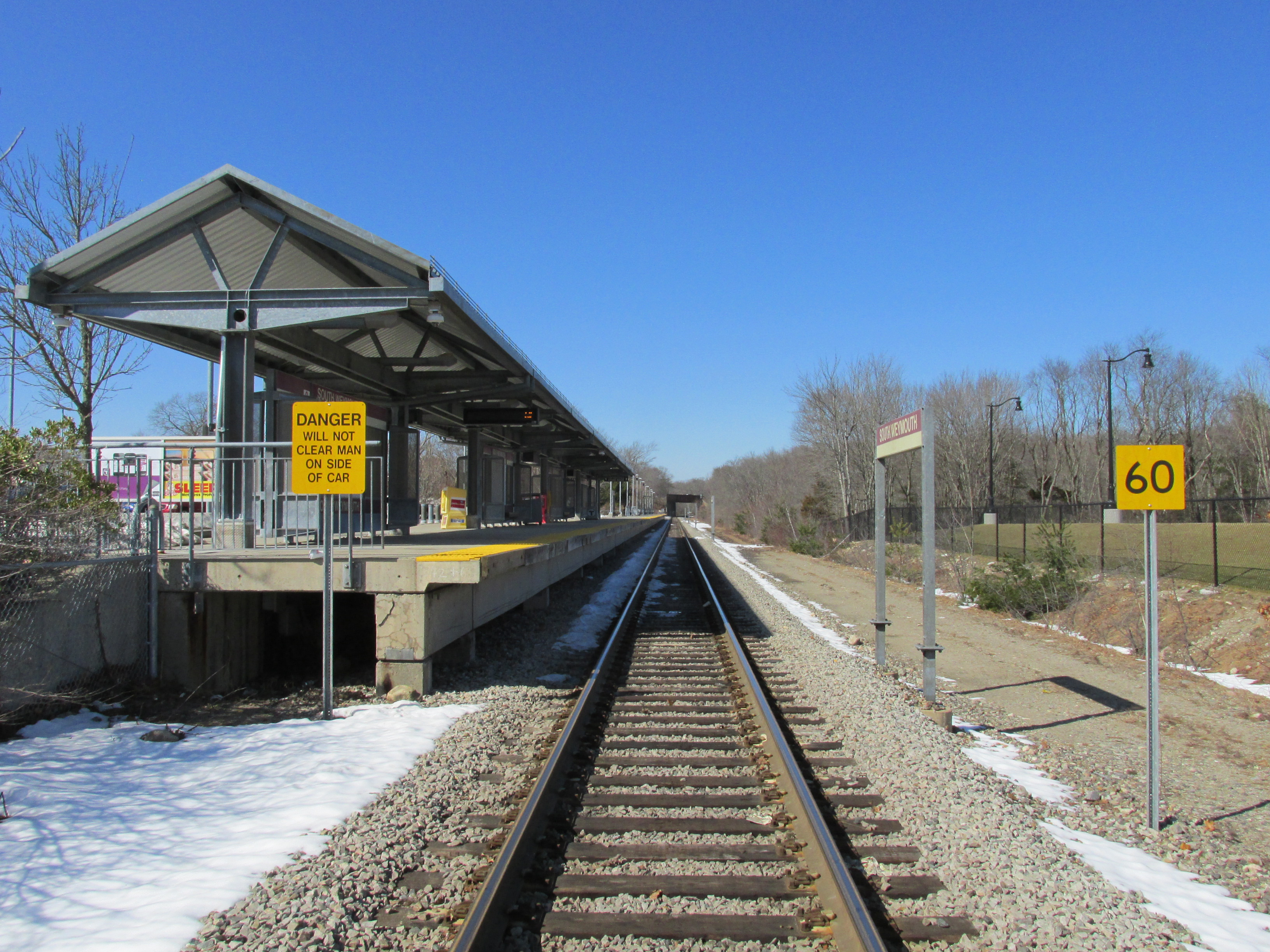
- South Weymouth station in 2013

General information
- Location: 89 Trotter Road; Weymouth, Massachusetts
- Coordinates: 42.1548°N 70.9533°W
- Line: Plymouth Branch
- Platforms: 1 side platform
- Tracks: 1

Construction
- Parking: 539 spaces
- Cycle facilities: 10 spaces
- Accessible: Yes

Other information
- Fare zone: 3

History
- Opened: 1845; September 29, 1997
- Closed: June 30, 1959

Passengers
- 2024: 515 daily boardings

Services
Preceding station	MBTA	Following station
Braintree toward South Station	Kingston Line	Abington toward Kingston
Location

South Weymouth station is an MBTA Commuter Rail station in Weymouth, Massachusetts. It serves the Kingston Line, and is located on the west side of the former South Weymouth Naval Air Station in the South Weymouth village.

== History ==
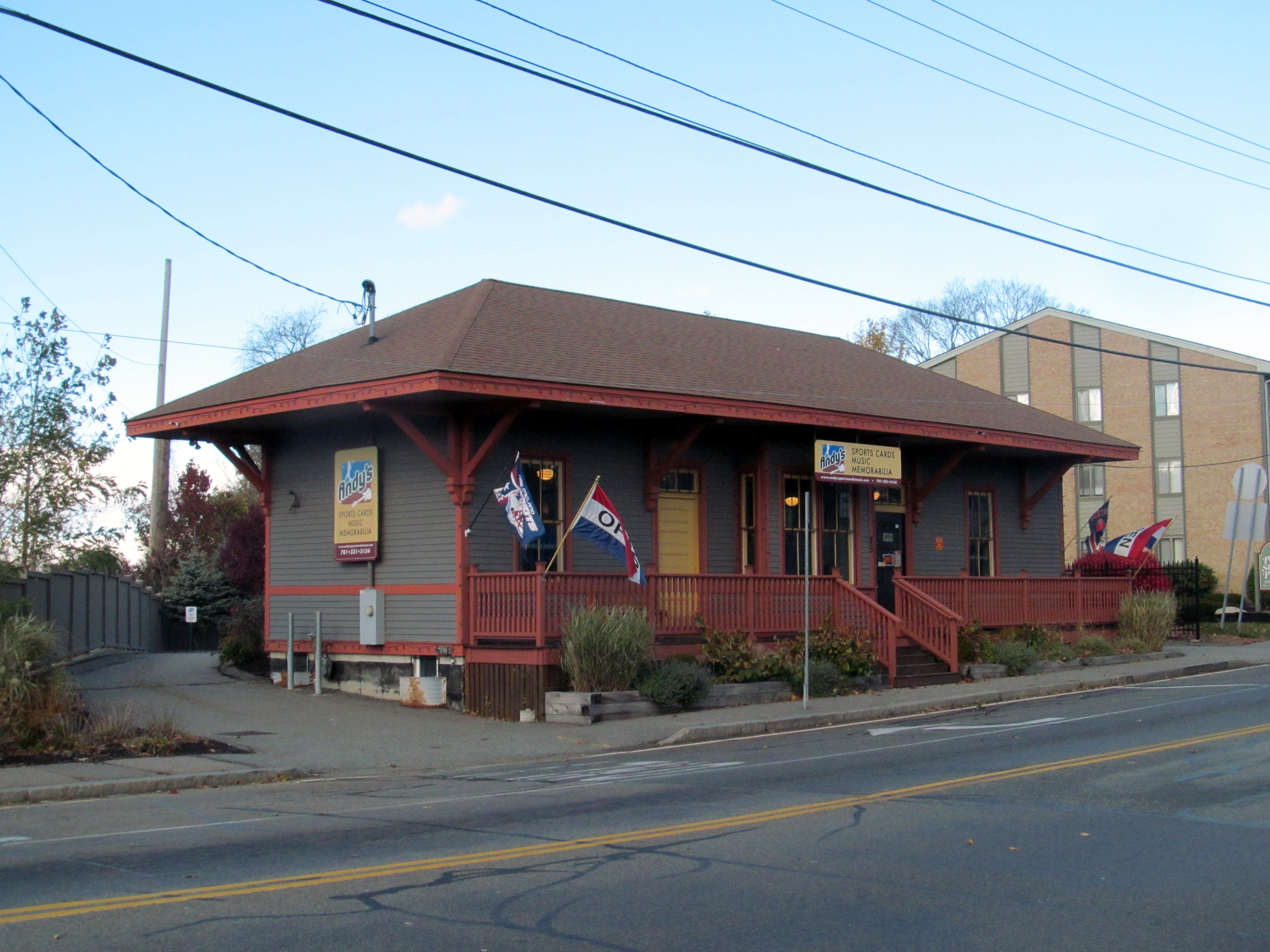
The former South Weymouth station in 2016

South Weymouth station opened along with on the Old Colony Railroad in 1845. The railroad built a small wood-frame depot, which served as the station facilities for the next 114 years. A new structure – likely an adjacent freight house – was constructed in 1869. The line closed on June 30, 1959, after the completion of the Southeast Expressway.

The building was used by a drywall company for two decades. It was bought in 2001; in 2005, the entire building was placed on jacks and rotated from its original location to face Pond Street. The building was initially used as a general store, then as a sports memorabilia shop beginning in 2010.

The MBTA began restoring the Old Colony Lines for commuter service in the 1990s. The new South Weymouth station was located south of the town center and the old station on land formerly part of South Weymouth Naval Air Station. The station opened along with the Plymouth/Kingston Line and the Middleborough/Lakeville Line on September 29, 1997.
