= Chatham station (Massachusetts) =

Railway station in Chatham, Massachusetts, US

Chatham
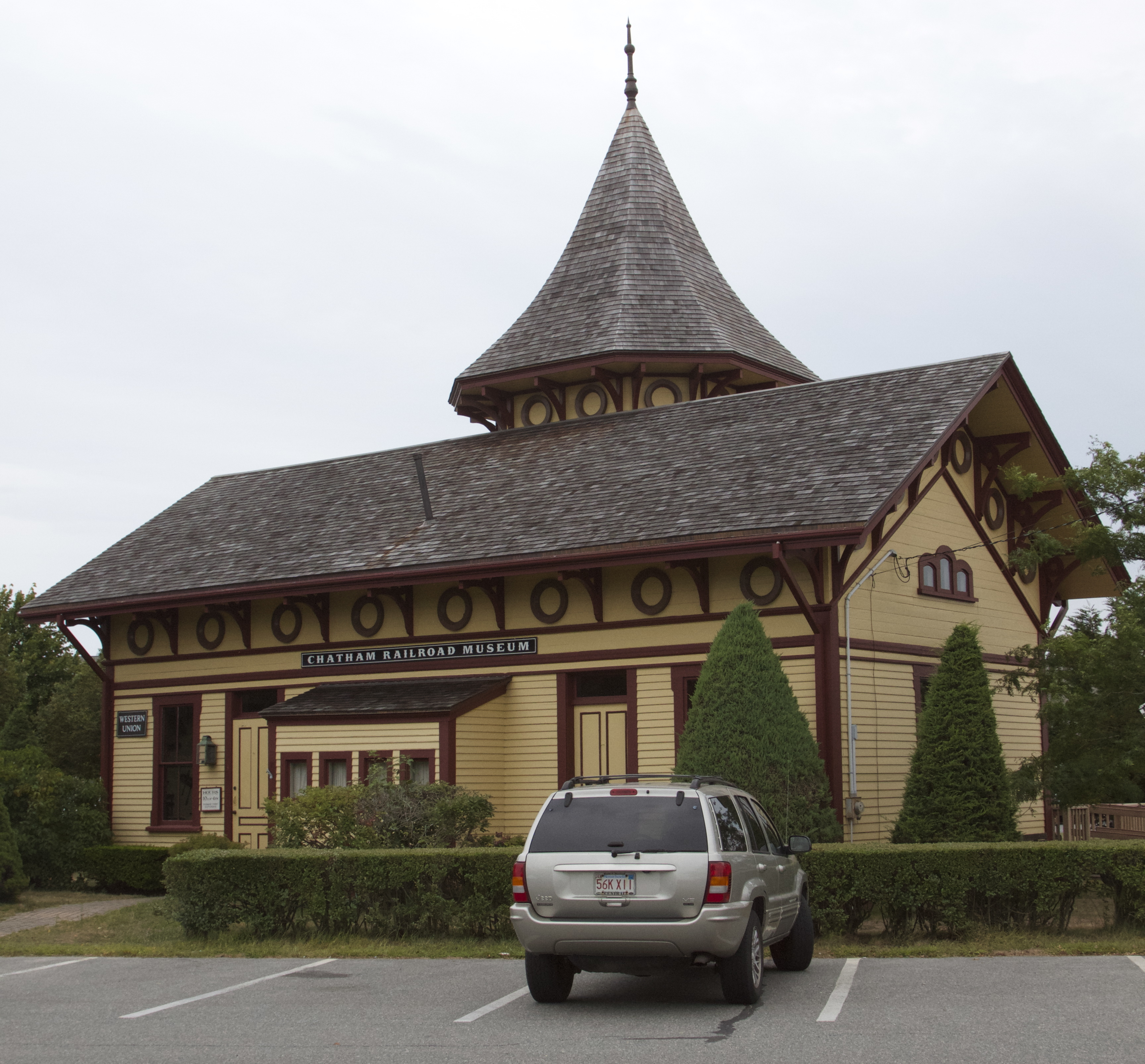
- Chatham Railroad Museum in August 2013

General information
- Location: 153 Depot Road; Chatham, Massachusetts
- Coordinates: 41.68575°N 69.96165°W
- Owner: Town of Chatham
- Line: Chatham Branch
- Platforms: 1 side platform

History
- Opened: November 21, 1887
- Closed: 1931 (passenger service); 1937 (freight)
- Rebuilt: 1960 (as a museum)

Former services
| Preceding station | New York, New Haven and Hartford Railroad | Following station |
|---|---|---|
| West Chatham toward Harwich | Chatham Branch | Terminus |
- Chatham Railroad Depot
- U.S. National Register of Historic Places
- Architect: David Howes
- Architectural style: Queen Anne, Stick, Eastlake
- NRHP reference No.: 78000422
- Added to NRHP: 1978
Location

Chatham station is a former railroad station located on Depot Road in Chatham, Massachusetts. In use from 1887 to 1937, it has housed the Chatham Railroad Museum since 1960. The station was listed on the National Register of Historic Places in 1978 as Chatham Railroad Depot.

== History ==
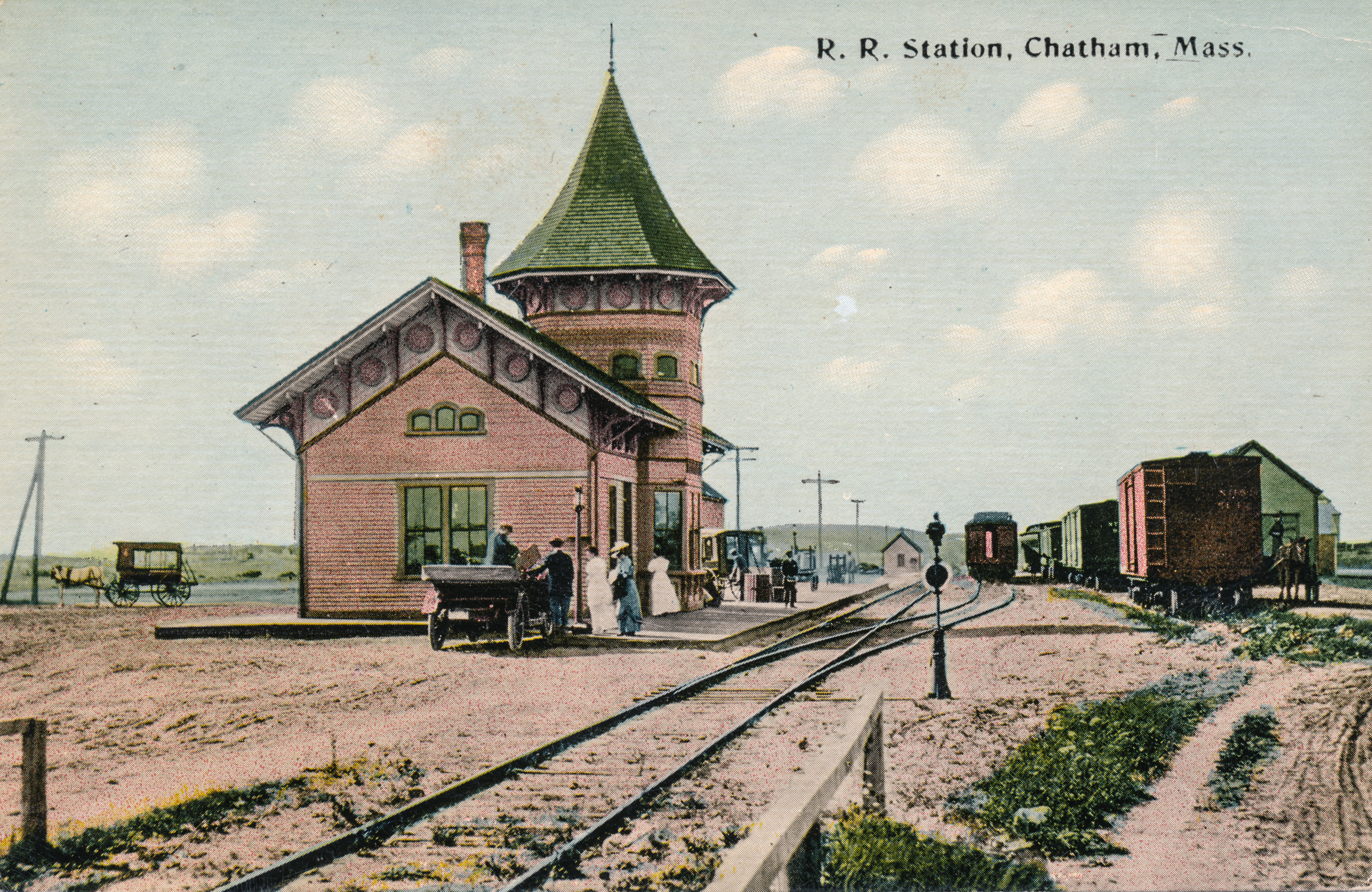
The station around 1910

The Chatham Railroad opened between Harwich and Chatham on November 21, 1887. It was immediately leased by the Old Colony Railroad, which controlled all rail lines on Cape Cod, as its Chatham Branch. The Old Colony was leased by the New York, New Haven and Hartford Railroad in 1893.

Chatham station is a 1 1/2-story wooden structure with a gable roof. An octagonal tower protrudes from the north side of the building, with its base serving as a trackside bay window. The site also included a freight house, engine house, car house, and toolshed.

The cupola was damaged by a lightning strike in 1926. Passenger service on the Chatham Branch ended in 1931; it was the first line on Cape Cod to lose service. Freight service continued until the line was abandoned in 1937. The stations were sold to private individuals; all but Chatham were eventually demolished. The Chatham freight house was moved to the residence of artist Alice Stallknecht in the 1940s.

The station was proposed for demolition in 1957–58, but it was purchased in 1959 by Phyllis Graves Cox for use as a museum. It was restored over the next year and reopened as the Chatham Railroad Museum in July 1960. The station was listed on the National Register of Historic Places in 1978 as "Chatham Railroad Depot". The freight house was moved to the grounds of the Old Atwood House Museum in Chatham in 1977.

The Chatham Railroad Museum features railroad artifacts, including the New York Central Railroad model locomotives used at the 1939 New York World's Fair. Other displays include original and operating Western Union telegraph equipment, lanterns, badges, signs, tools, timetables, menus and passes, promotional literature, original paintings and prints, calendars, and a restored 1910 caboose. The caboose was donated by the New York Central in 1962.

== See also ==
- National Register of Historic Places listings in Barnstable County, Massachusetts
