= Old Colony Rail Trail =

Rail trail in Massachusetts, United States

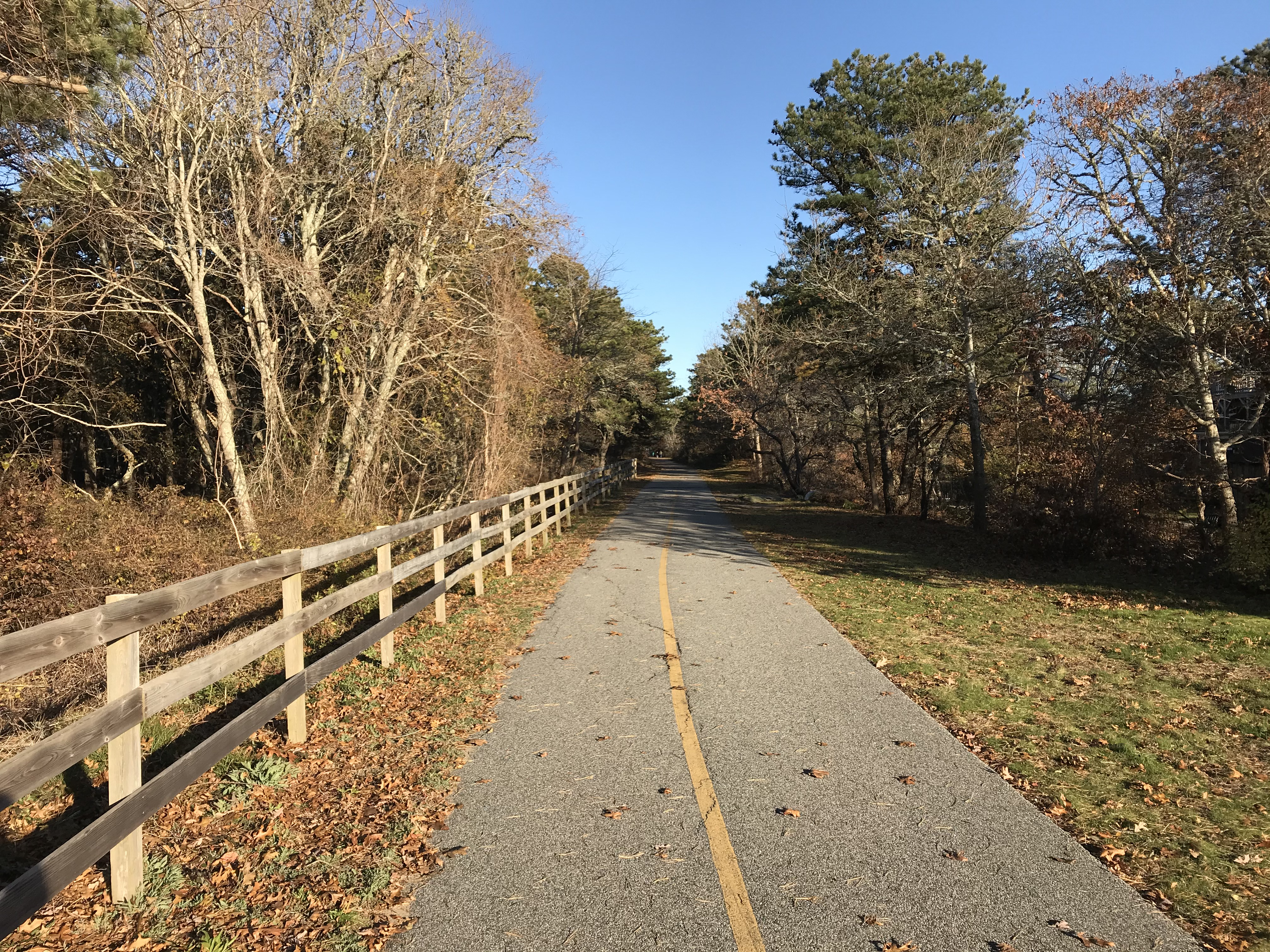
- Old Colony Rail Trail in South Chatham
- Location: Barnstable County
- Trailheads: Cape Cod Rail Trail, Harwich; Crowell Road, Chatham
- Surface: Paved surface
- Right of way: former railroad line

The Old Colony Rail Trail is a paved rail trail located in Harwich and Chatham, Massachusetts. It occupies the Old Colony Railroad's abandoned Chatham Branch railroad right-of-way. Most of the trail follows roughly the path of the old railbed, except for deviations around the Chatham Municipal Airport and a utility yard in Harwich. Its west end connects to the Cape Cod Rail Trail in Harwich at a bike rotary.

A multi-use path along George Ryder Road is planned to separate trail users from auto traffic. $323,000 in state funding for design and construction was awarded in 2022.
