= Russell Pond (Massachusetts) =

Pond in the United States

- Location within Massachusetts Location within the United States
- Location: Kingston, Massachusetts
- Coordinates: 41°58′34″N 70°44′50″W
- Primary outflows: Furnace Brook
- Basin countries: United States
- Surface area: 14 acres (5.7 ha)

Russell Pond is a 14-acre (57,000 m^{2}) pond in Kingston, Massachusetts.

== Background ==
The pond is located northeast of Indian Pond off Route 80. The pond is the headwaters to Furnace Brook, a tributary of the Jones River. The water quality is impaired due to non-native aquatic plants and non-native fish in the pond.
