= Harrobs Corner Bog Pond =

Lake in Plympton, Massachusetts, US

- Location within Massachusetts
- Location: Plympton, Massachusetts
- Coordinates: 41°59′42″N 70°47′53″W
- Primary outflows: unnamed brook
- Basin countries: United States
- Surface area: 16 acres (6.5 ha)
- Settlements: North Plympton, Harrobs Corner

Harrobs Corner Bog Pond is a 16-acre (65,000 m^{2}) pond in Plympton, Massachusetts. The pond is located in the North Plympton section of the town north of Harrobs Corner off Route 106 and Lake Street, and south of Silver Lake village. The pond is hydrologically associated with a cranberry bog operation located to the northeast of the pond. An unnamed brook heading south toward Jones River Creek, a tributary of the Jones River, is the outflow of the pond. The water quality is impaired due to non-native aquatic plants in the pond.
