= Hobomock Inn =

Coordinates: 42.057905°N 70.810778°W

The Hobomock Inn was located on Route 36 (a state highway) in Pembroke, Massachusetts. It was famous as a meeting place for American politician, four-term mayor of Boston and one-term Governor of Massachusetts, James Michael Curley and his friends and supporters. Curley also served two terms in the U. S, House of Representatives from 1911 to 1914 representing two different districts. It is claimed that the Hobomock Inn was the reason for the creation of Route 36.
