= Rocky Nook, Massachusetts =

Human settlement in Massachusetts, United States of America

Coordinates: 41°59′15″N 70°42′01″W

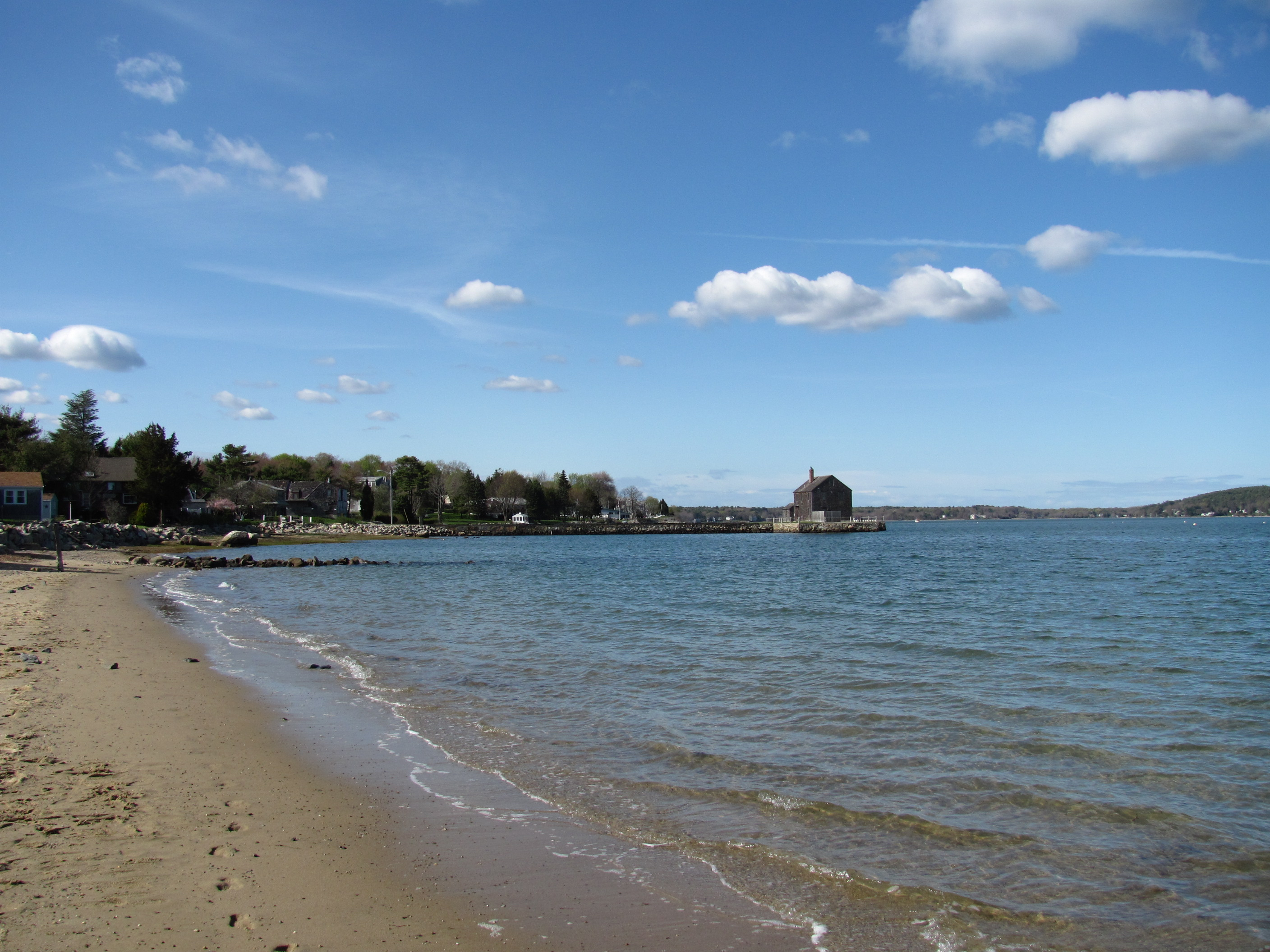
Gray's Beach

Rocky Nook is a neighborhood in Kingston, Massachusetts. The neighborhood sits on a small peninsula of land on Kingston Bay where the Jones River meets the Atlantic Ocean, near Duxbury, Massachusetts.

== History ==
Early American colonist John Howland purchased a property in Rocky Nook and settled there with his wife Elizabeth sometime between 2 February 1638 and 2 April 1640. A stone wall that marked a border of the property as well as three cellar holes for buildings on the property are still present at the site today.

Rocky Nook was sparsely populated throughout the 18th and 19th centuries until 1904 when investors from Brockton, Massachusetts purchased land and created the Rocky Nook Park summer resort. The 30 acre resort had cottages that families would rent and use as summer homes. These homes were eventually used as full-time residences.

As of 2016, the area was desirable due to its water and beach access, affordability, proximity to the MBTA Commuter Rail, and nearby shopping and dining establishments.
