= Pembroke, Massachusetts =

- Town
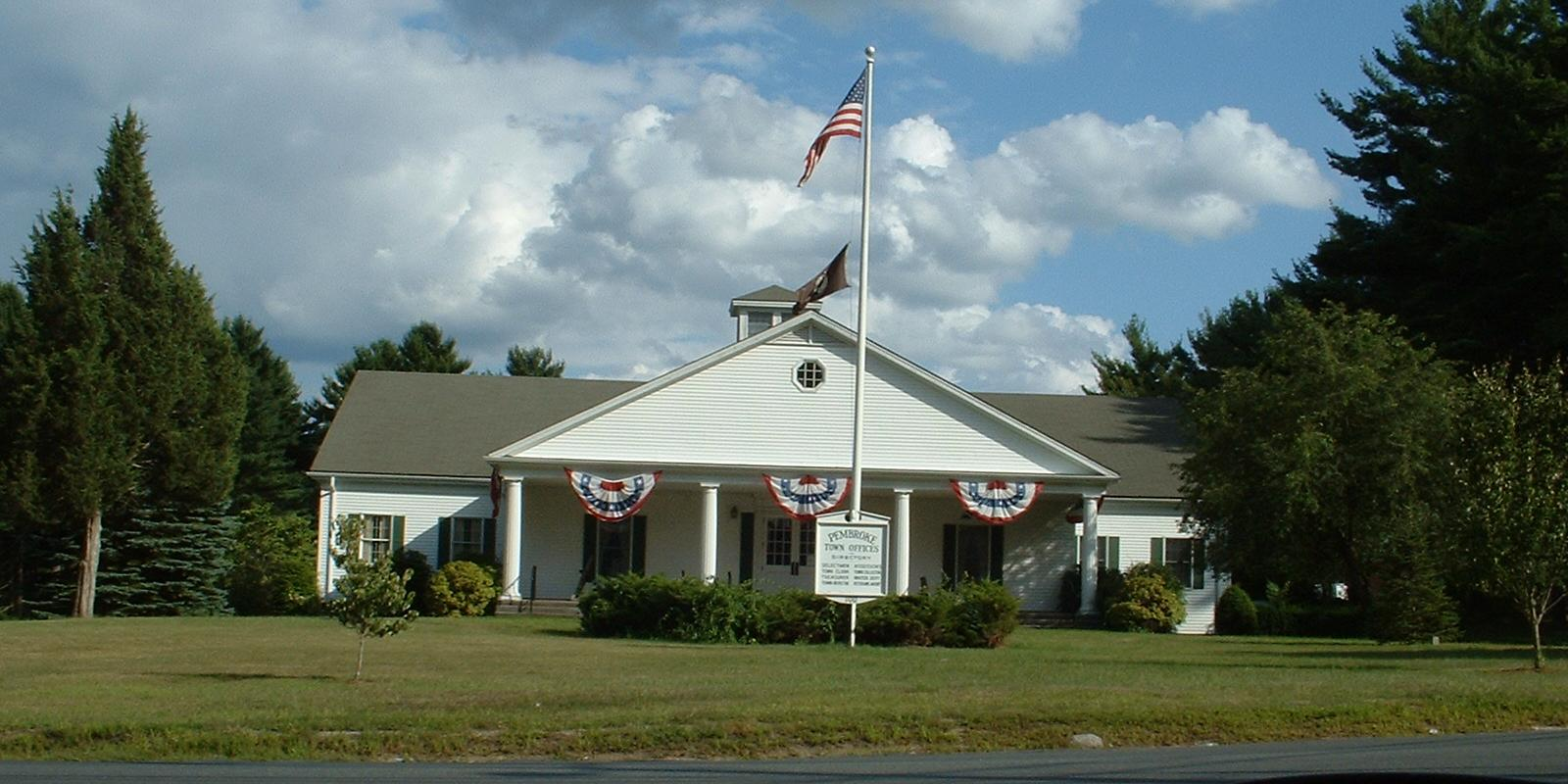
- Pembroke Town Hall

- Flag Seal

- Location in Plymouth County in Massachusetts
- Coordinates: 42°4′N 70°49′W
- Country: United States
- State: Massachusetts
- County: Plymouth
- Settled: 1650
- Incorporated: 1712
- Named for: Pembroke, Wales

Government
  - Type: Open town meeting

Area
  - Total: 23.5 sq mi (60.8 km^{2})
  - Land: 21.9 sq mi (56.6 km^{2})
  - Water: 1.6 sq mi (4.2 km^{2})
- Elevation: 69 ft (21 m)

Population (2020)
  - Total: 18,361
  - Density: 840/sq mi (324.4/km^{2})
- Time zone: UTC−5 (Eastern)
  - Summer (DST): UTC−4 (Eastern)
- ZIP Codes: 02359 (Pembroke); 02327 (Bryantville); 02358 (North Pembroke)
- Area code: 339/781
- FIPS code: 25-52630
- GNIS feature ID: 0618348
- Website: www.pembroke-ma.gov

Pembroke is a town in Plymouth County, Massachusetts, United States. Pembroke is a South Shore suburb of the Boston metropolitan area. The town is located approximately halfway between Boston and Cape Cod. The town is considered rural in character, with pockets of suburban neighborhoods. The population was 18,361 at the 2020 census, with a median household income of $119,827.

Neighborhoods include Bryantville (along the Hanson town line), North Pembroke and East Pembroke.

== History ==
The earliest European settlers were Robert Barker and Dolor Davis, who settled in the vicinity of Herring Brook in 1650. It has been said that the Barkers were about to go down the Indian Head River, at "The Crotch" of the North River in modern day Pembroke/Hanover. However, the Barkers went down the Herring Run to the South, thus landing on Pembroke land. For thousands of years before that time, the Wampanoag and the Massachusett tribes lived on the land, fishing and farming along the rivers. They called the area Mattakeesett, which means "place of much fish", because of the annual springtime run of herring in the local rivers. The land was part of the Major's Purchase, a large tract of lands bought from Josias Wampatuck of the Massachusetts by a group of English investors. The area was once a part of Duxbury, before incorporating as a separate town in 1712, and was ultimately named for the town of Pembroke, Wales, the name of Brookfield being rejected because it was already in use by the town in Worcester County that still bears this name.

Most notable of the town's resources are its water resources, which include the North River and Indian Head River; its ponds, Oldham, Furnace, Great Sandy Bottom, Little Sandy Bottom, and Stetson Ponds; and Silver Lake. The town's ponds, streams and marshes are the home of herring that were prized so much that in 1741, the town began regulating the taking and preservation of the fish. The herring are celebrated each year at the town's annual "Grande Old Fish Fry".

The Pembroke Iron Works was established in 1720 and used bog iron taken from the surface of rocks on the bottom of the ponds, swamps, and bogs. Ice was cut from the ponds, stored in icehouses, and used in the summer months for food preservation. The ponds and streams also provided power for various mills, including grist, flour and sawmills. Later, shipbuilding and box manufacturing became important factors in the development of the town.

The town has large tracts of woodlands that provided timber for homes and industry, and provided cover for abundant wildlife. Because of its proximity to timber and location on the river, the town in its early years was known for its shipbuilding industry. The North River was the location of five shipyards—Brick Kiln Yard, Seabury Point, Job's Landing, Turner's Yard and Macy's. Between 1678 and 1871, 1,025 vessels were produced on the shores of the North River.

Just before the Revolution, Reverend Gad Hitchcock of Pembroke (who had served with the provincial troops as a chaplain in upstate New York during the French and Indian War) gave a sermon in Boston blasting the British, and was rewarded for this with a set of fine new clothes from Samuel Adams. Residents of Pembroke again served with honor from the first "alarm" sent out by Paul Revere and others on April 19, 1775, till the end of the war.

The town took its current form in 1820, when the western half of town known as the "West Parish" was separated and incorporated as Hanson. Shipbuilding was among the area's industries, with five yards along the North River. Famous among these were the Beaver, a vessel made famous for its role in the Boston Tea Party, and the Maria, memorialized on the Pembroke town seal. It was along the same river, on the Norwell side, that the Columbia, namesake of the Columbia River in Oregon, was launched. By the turn of the 20th century, mills had sprung up along the river, and the town's ponds and streams provided the water for cranberry bogs. Because of rail service from Brockton, the town's ponds also provided recreation and vacation spots for city dwellers.

A Massachusetts Historical Commission reconnaissance survey report dated June 1981 indicated that in the early 20th century the popularity of the cranberry spurred the construction of numerous bogs. By 1924 there were 17 cranberry growers in the Pembroke directory, with 14 producers listed as having Bryantville addresses. In the same year there were 14 poultry farmers listed, indicating that by that time poultry raising was well established in town. The E. H. Clapp rubber works, initiated on the Hanover side of the Indian Head River in 1871, expanded in 1873 to the Pembroke side of the river.

In the late 19th century and early 20th century, the ponds became an attraction for summer vacationers seeking relief from the heat in the cities. The Brockton and Plymouth Railway Co. initiated trolley service from Brockton and facilitated the development of Mayflower Grove in Bryantville as a popular summer recreation venue. The attractiveness of the ponds for summer recreation led to the development of numerous, dense cottage colonies built along their shores. The ponds are currently used for recreation, municipal water supplies and irrigation for cranberry bogs.

The town remained relatively stable in population from the end of the Civil War until the 1960s, when suburban migration from Boston and environs saw the town more than triple in population. Today, Pembroke is mostly a suburban community, with the majority of residents working in the Greater Boston area. In recent years Pembroke has developed into a fairly affluent and desirable community, with new home developments geared towards upmarket buyers.

As of 2009, Pembroke was a contender for CNN Money's "Best Places to Live," according to financial, education and quality of life statistics.

== Geography ==
According to the United States Census Bureau, the town has a total area of 23.5 square miles (61 km^{2}), of which 21.8 square miles (56 km^{2}) is land and 1.6 square miles (4.1 km^{2}), or 6.95%, is water. Statistically, Pembroke is slightly smaller than the state average in terms of land area. Pembroke is bordered by Norwell to the north, Marshfield to the northeast, Duxbury to the east, Kingston to the southeast, Plympton to the south, Halifax to the southwest, Hanson to the west, and Hanover to the northwest. Pembroke is approximately 12 miles (19 km) east of Brockton, 13 miles (21 km) northwest of Plymouth, and 27 miles (43 km) southeast of Boston.

Pembroke's geography can be divided in half. The northern half is dominated by the rivers and streams of the area, flowing through thick forests which once provided the lumber for the North River's shipbuilding industry. The southern half is dominated by several ponds and Silver Lake, where the towns of Pembroke, Kingston, Plympton and Halifax come together. The town has its own municipal forest, which is divided into sections around town.

One notable water resource in Pembroke is Great Sandy Bottom Pond, the water of which is currently leased to the Abington-Rockland Water Commission. A website displays many pictures of the plants and animals of the area, for example, eagles, herons, egrets, turtles, raccoons and fox.

== Transportation ==
Massachusetts Route 3 passes through the town's northeastern corner, skirting the irregular border with Marshfield. There is an exit from Route 3 in the town, which also grants access to Marshfield along Route 139. The town's other state routes include Routes 14, 27, 36, 53 and 139. Route 14 is in the town the longest, and passes through the town center. Route 36's northern terminus is at Route 14 just south of the town center.

There is no rail or air service in the town. The Kingston–Route 3 line of the MBTA's Commuter Rail passes just to the southeast of town, with the nearest stops being in Hanson and Halifax. Two public municipal airports are nearby: Cranland Airport in Hanson and Marshfield Municipal Airport. The nearest national and international air service is at Logan International Airport in Boston.

== Demographics ==
Historical population
Year	Pop.	±%
1790	1,954	—
1850	1,388	−29.0%
1860	1,524	+9.8%
1870	1,447	−5.1%
1880	1,405	−2.9%
1890	1,320	−6.0%
1900	1,240	−6.1%
1910	1,336	+7.7%
1920	1,358	+1.6%
1930	1,492	+9.9%
1940	1,718	+15.1%
1950	2,579	+50.1%
1960	4,919	+90.7%
1970	11,193	+127.5%
1980	13,487	+20.5%
1990	14,544	+7.8%
2000	16,927	+16.4%
2010	17,837	+5.4%
2020	18,360	+2.9%
2024*	18,428	+0.4%
* = population estimate. Source: United States census records and Population Estimates Program data.

As of the census of 2007, there were 18,549 people, 5,750 households, and 4,553 families residing in the town. The population density was 774.9 inhabitants per square mile (299.2/km^{2}). Statistically, the town's population and population density is slightly smaller than average, just below both averages. There were 5,897 housing units at an average density of 270.0 per square mile (104.2/km^{2}). The racial makeup of the town was 97.89% White, 0.50% African American, 0.07% Native American, 0.51% Asian, 0.01% Pacific Islander, 0.28% from other races, and 0.74% from two or more races. Hispanic or Latino of any race were 0.53% of the population.

There were 5,750 households, out of which 40.8% had children under the age of 18 living with them, 66.7% were married couples living together, 8.9% had a female householder with no husband present, and 20.8% were non-families. Of all households 16.7% were made up of individuals, and 6.2% had someone living alone who was 65 years of age or older. The average household size was 2.92 and the average family size was 3.31.

In the town, the population was spread out, with 28.6% under the age of 18, 5.9% from 18 to 24, 32.8% from 25 to 44, 24.3% from 45 to 64, and 8.3% who were 65 years of age or older. The median age was 37.2 years. For every 100 females, there were 97.9 males. For every 100 females age 18 and over, there were 93.7 males. As of 2009, Pembroke has a marriage percentage of 62.1 and a divorce percentage of 8.2.

As of 2020, the median income for a household in the town was $119,827. About 2.5% of the population were below the poverty line.

== Government ==
On the national level, Pembroke is a part of Massachusetts's 9th congressional district, and is currently represented by William R. Keating. The state's senior (Class I) senator, elected in 2012, is Elizabeth Warren. The state's junior member of the United States Senate, elected in 2013, is Ed Markey.

On the state level, Pembroke is represented by Representative Josh Cutler in the Massachusetts House of Representatives as a part of the Sixth Plymouth district, which includes the town of Hanson, and precincts 2–6 of the town of Duxbury. The town is represented by Senator Susan Moran in the Massachusetts Senate as a part of the Plymouth and Barnstable District, which includes Bourne, Falmouth, Kingston, Plymouth, Plympton, and Sandwich. The town is patrolled by the First (Norwell) Barracks of Troop D of the Massachusetts State Police.

Pembroke is governed by the open town meeting form of government, and is led by an executive secretary and a board of selectmen. Pembroke operates its own police and fire departments, with four stations located in the town center, Bryantville, North Pembroke and at Brimstone Corner. The town has its own emergency services; South Shore Hospital in Weymouth and Beth Israel Deaconess Hospital in Plymouth are the nearest hospitals; the Pembroke hospital serves psychiatric patients in the area. There are post offices at the town center, Bryantville and North Pembroke. The Pembroke Public Library is located at the town center, and is a part of the SAILS Library Network. There are also two small private libraries, which are open to the public: the Lydia Drake Library near Brimstone Corner and the Cobb Library in Bryantville.

== Education ==
In 1952, Pembroke was a founding community of the Silver Lake Regional School District, along with Kingston, Halifax, and Plympton. Due to chronic overcrowding which had led to split sessions by 1970 and double sessions by 1974, the town built its own campus of Silver Lake Regional High School in 1976, across from Hobomock Elementary School on Learning Lane. Flooding due to burst pipes delayed its occupancy until November 1976.

In 2002, with growing population again an issue, Pembroke separated from the other towns to reestablish its own school district; its students remained at Silver Lake RHS until 2004. The satellite campus, which had been in service as the Silver Lake district's middle school in recent years, was renovated to become Pembroke High School, and serves students from ninth through twelfth grade. Pembroke's athletics teams are known as the Titans (complete with a logo reminiscent of the Tennessee Titans logo), and their colors are blue and white. They compete in the Patriot League. Pembroke has established a Thanksgiving Day football rivalry with previously mentioned Silver Lake Regional High School.

The town has three elementary schools (Bryantville, Hobomock and North Pembroke), which serve students from kindergarten through sixth grades (North Pembroke also serves pre-kindergarten classes). The Pembroke Community Middle School, located in the former Silver Lake Regional Junior High School on Route 27, serves seventh and eighth grade students.

The town has no contract with any vocational schools, the nearest being South Shore Vocational Tech in Hanover. The nearest four-year college is Bridgewater State University; the nearest community colleges are Quincy College's satellite campus in Plymouth and Massasoit Community College in Brockton.

== Arts and media ==
Pembroke is served by the Boston metropolitan media. Regional daily newspapers which cover the town include the Quincy Patriot Ledger and the Brockton Enterprise. For many years, the town was covered by the weekly Silver Lake News, based in Pembroke; it is currently served by one weekly, The Pembroke Mariner & Express.

The public access organization that serves the town is The Local Seen, located in Plymouth. Residents can watch a public access channel (6) shared with Plymouth, Duxbury, and Kingston, as well as the education channel (8) and government channel (9). The Pembroke Government Channel is where one can see gavel-to-gavel coverage of local government meetings held in Pembroke, Massachusetts, government shows with local, county and state officials and other government-related programming. The Local Seen This Week is a local news program shown weekly on channel 6. The education channel features all kinds of performing arts from Pembroke as well as Titan TV News, a monthly show produced by journalism students at Pembroke High School.

The town is supportive of many arts programs, including the Pembroke Imperials Drum & Bugle Corps, a corps active on and off since the 1960s.

The Pembroke Association of Performing Arts (PAPA) is dedicated to promoting and maintaining enthusiastic interest in all aspects of the performing arts programs in Pembroke schools.

== Points of interest ==
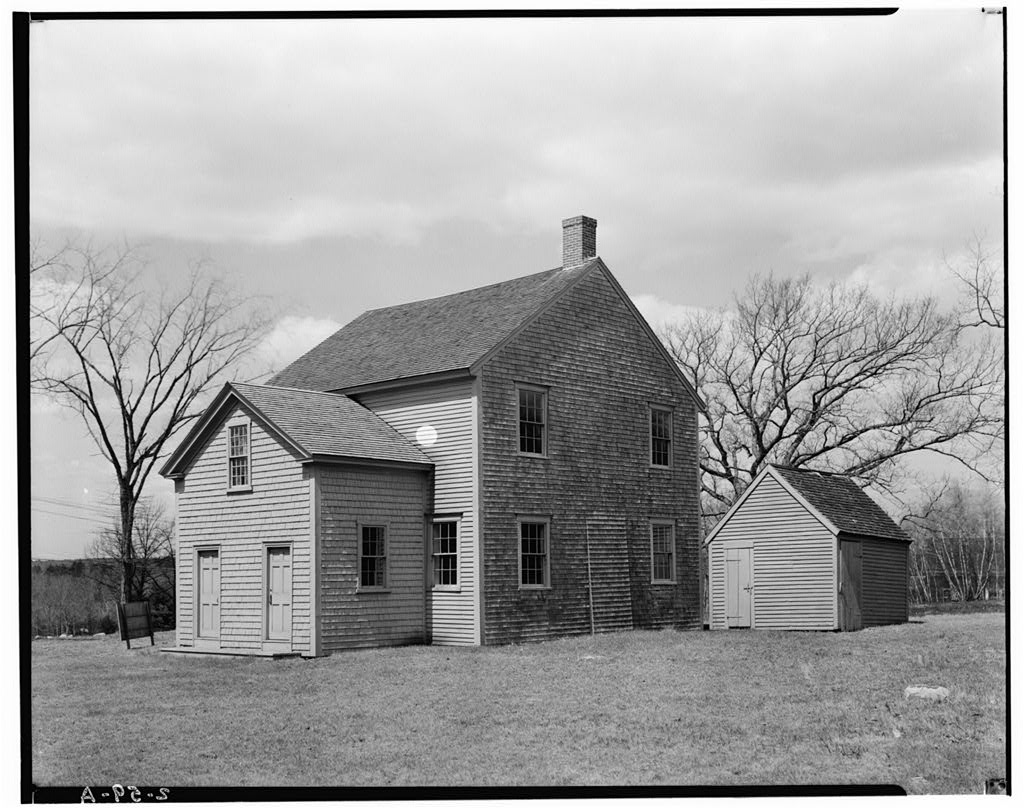
Pembroke Friends Meetinghouse (1706)

Pembroke Country Club, purchased by former NHL player Jeremy Roenick, is an 18-hole course featuring 6,532 yards of golf from the longest tees for a par of 71. The course rating is 71.1 and it has a slope rating of 124. Pembroke Country Club was designed by Philip A. Wogan, ASGCA, and opened in 1973.

Pembroke Historical Society is a museum consisting of two former one-room school buildings. The former Bryantville School, built in 1847, was donated by Marcus L. Urann and moved to the site in 1952. The former "cedar Swamp Schools" was donated by Mrs. Oliver Amos and moved to the site in 1968. As part of the nation's 1976 Bicentennial celebration, a Tool Museum was established in the lower level of the Museum Building.

The Pembroke Friends Meetinghouse (1706) is located at Routes 139 and 53. The interior is divided in half, with women sitting on one side and men on the other. In the 18th and 19th centuries, many leading citizens were Quakers. Among the oldest Quaker sites in America, the structure was deeded to the Historical Society in 1973.

The Grand Old Fish Fry is usually held the first weekend in May at the Thomas Reading Herring Run Park on Route 14 (Barker Street). For 30+ years the Historical Society has invited the public to the herring run for a day of great food, music, duck races and much more. When the event first began herring were caught with nets and cooked right on site by Chef Bobby Hackett. Unfortunately, the state no longer allows the harvesting of herring due to the low numbers. Fish cakes have replaced the herring meal, and no one seems to be complaining. This is the primary fundraiser and one of the most popular for the Society. Funds raised go to the care and maintenance of the three properties (Friends Meeting House, Adah Hall House and the museum building) owned by the Historical Society.

== Notable people ==
- Gleason Archer, Sr., founder of Suffolk University, author
- Thomas Humphrey Cushing, Revolutionary War officer and Adjutant General of the U.S. Army
- Ben Edlund, creator of The Tick and TV producer
- Eric Flaim, Olympic silver medalist in speed skating
- Stephen N. Gifford, politician and longtime Clerk of the Massachusetts Senate
- Duane Joyce, professional hockey player
- Joseph Leavitt, Revolutionary War conscientious objector
- Alexander Parris, architect
- Dwight E. Sargent, journalist
- Pat Seltsam, Olympic speedskater, 1990 national champion and World Cup medalist in 1989
- Dave Shea, former Boston Bruins play-by-play announcer
- Josiah Smith, United States congressman
- Kevin Stevens, National Hockey League All-Star left winger
- Buddy Teevens, football coach for Dartmouth College
- Harry Irving Thayer, United States congressman
- Nora Vasconcellos, professional skateboarder for Adidas and Welcome brand skateboards
- Luke Vercollone, professional soccer player
- Harry M. Woods, lyricist and composer of "When the Red Red Robin Comes Bobbin' Along" and "Try a Little Tenderness"
