= Seltsam =

Seltsam is a German surname. Notable people with the surname include:

- Marianne Seltsam (1932–2014), German alpine skier
- Pat Seltsam (born 1965), American speedskater
