= Monponsett Pond =

Lake in Massachusetts, United States of America

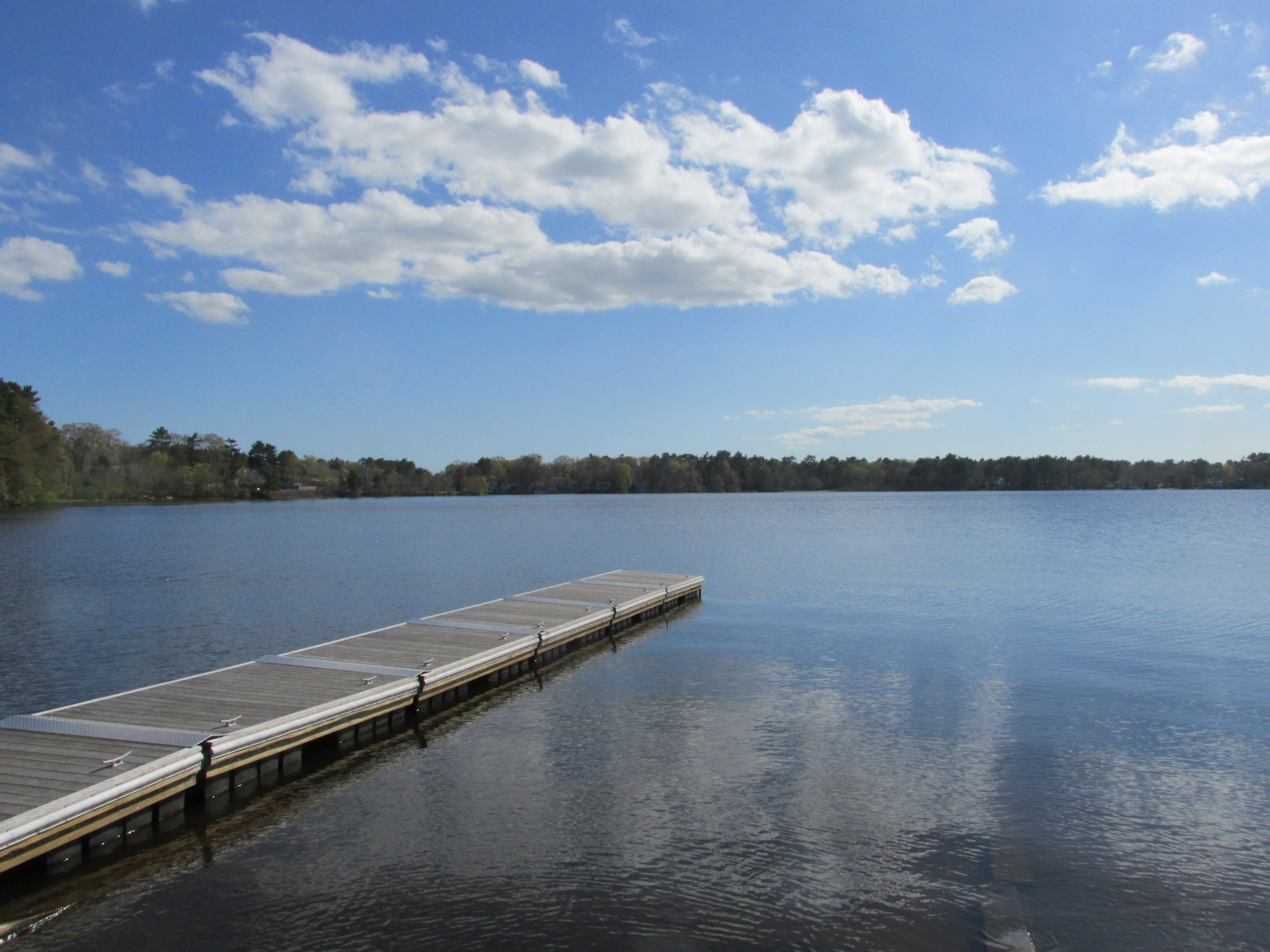
- West Monponsett Pond

- Location within Massachusetts
- Location: Halifax, Massachusetts
- Coordinates: 42°0′22.25″N 70°50′34.72″W
- Primary outflows: Stump Brook
- Basin countries: United States
- Surface area: Western: 282 acres (1.14 km^{2}); Eastern: 246 acres (1.00 km^{2})
- Average depth: 7 ft (2.1 m)
- Max. depth: 13 ft (4.0 m)

Monponsett Pond, also called Monponsett Lake and the Twin Lakes, originally one lake is dissected by route 58 into a system of two ponds, West and East, mostly in Halifax, Massachusetts, with a small portion of West Monponsett Pond extending into Hanson. The western basin is 308 acres (1.25 km^{2}), and the eastern basin is 272 acres (1.10 km^{2}). The average depth of both ponds is seven feet and the maximum depth is 13 feet (4.0 m). The outflow is Stump Brook (Snaky River on some historical maps), located in the northwestern part of West Monponsett Pond, which flows in a southwest direction into Robbins Pond, which forms the headwaters of the Sautucket River, a tributary of The Taunton River. The pond is part of the Taunton River Watershed. Water from Monponsett is diverted into Silver Lake, the principal water supply for the City of Brockton. Water diversions from Monponsett into Silver lake are not permitted during the summer months from June 1 - September 30. Diversions are only allowed during the months of October through May.

Route 58 bisects the two ponds. A paved boat launching ramp to West Monponsett Pond is on this highway north of White Island Road. White Island in the center of the pond is known to have been the fishing camp of Wamsutta, brother of Chief Metacomet (also known as King Philip). A culvert connecting the two ponds is nearby. Route 106 runs close to the southern shore of East Monponsett Pond, and Route 36 abuts the southeast corner of East Monponsett Pond, where there is a paved launching ramp. Access to West Monponsett Pond for larger boats can be found off of route 58, and for smaller boats there is an unpaved ramp off Lingan Street. Monponsett Pond Seaplane Base is located on this pond.
