= Silver Lake Regional High School =

Coordinates: 42°0′55.1″N 70°47′8.5″W

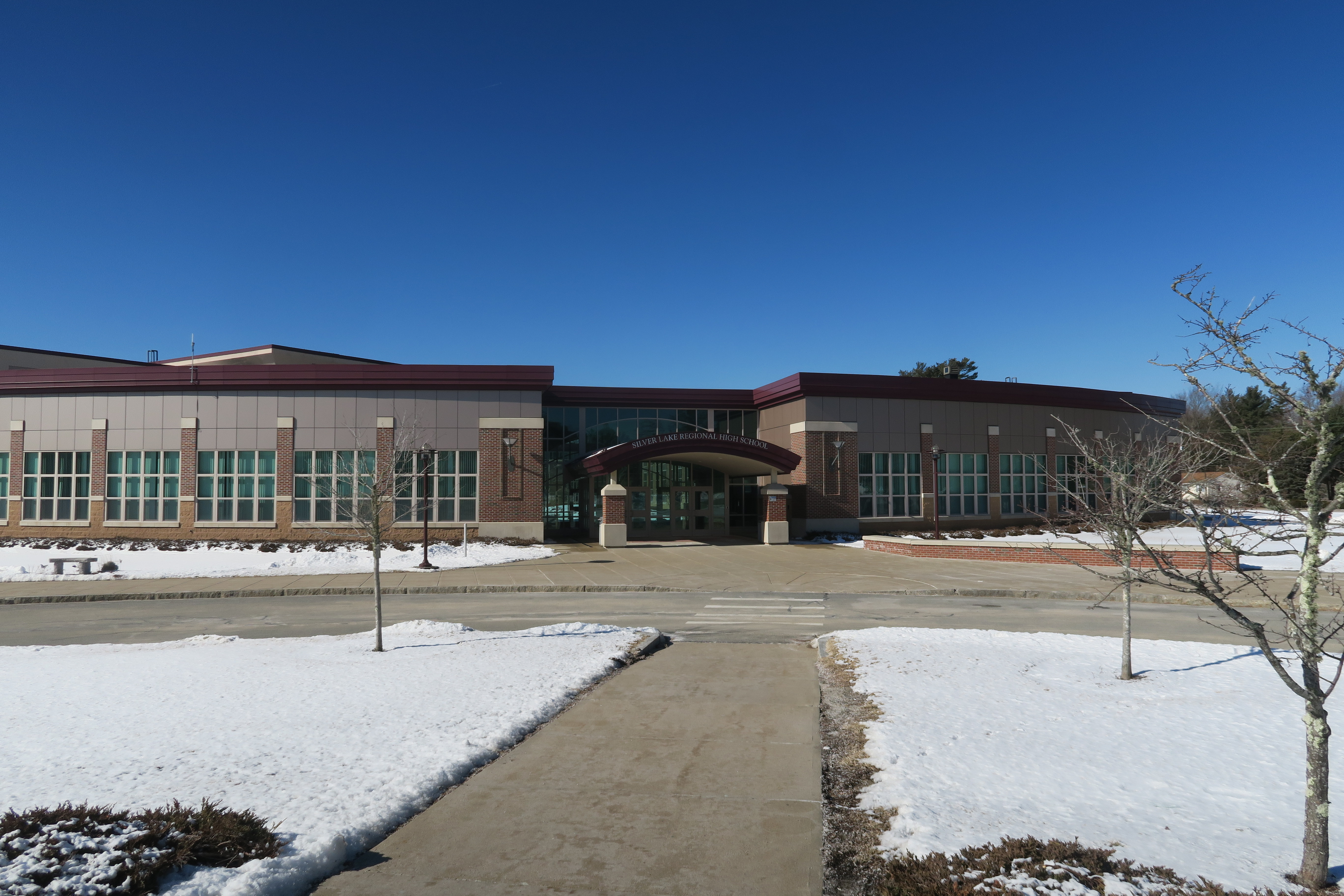
- Silver Lake Regional High School

Location
- 260 Pembroke Street; Kingston, Plymouth County, Massachusetts 02364; United States

Information
- Type: Public
- Established: 1955
- Status: Open
- CEEB code: 221105
- Principal: Michaela Gill
- Teaching staff: 84.07 (on an FTE basis)
- Grades: 9–12
- Gender: Coeducational
- Enrollment: 1,046 (2022-2023)
- Student to teacher ratio: 12.44
- Campus size: 300 acres (1.2 km^{2})
- Colors: Red, White & Silver
- Nickname: Lakers
- Newspaper: The Laker Legend
- Yearbook: The Torch
- Communities served: Kingston, Plympton, Halifax
- Feeder schools: Silver Lake Regional Middle School
- Website: Silver Lake Regional High School

Silver Lake Regional High School is a public, regional high school in Massachusetts' South Shore region. It is the only secondary school in the Silver Lake Regional School District, comprising the towns of Kingston, Plympton and Halifax, Massachusetts. From 1955 to 2004, the Silver Lake Regional School District included the town of Pembroke, Massachusetts.

== History ==
Named for Silver Lake, which borders the four towns which belonged to the district for most of its history – Plympton, Halifax, Pembroke and Kingston - and which is situated near the campus, Silver Lake Regional High School opened on September 19, 1955, attended by students from the towns of Pembroke, Kingston, Plympton, Halifax and Carver in southeastern Massachusetts. The school was constructed for $1.7 million, and originally housed grades 7–12. Over ten thousand spectators attended the dedication, which was keynoted by Senator Leverett Saltonstall. The original graduating class was 81 students.

Carver left the district in 1959, and its students began attending Middleboro High School, before joining the Plymouth-Carver regional school district in 1963. In 1958, the seventh and eighth grades were split off into the former Kingston High School building (which stood behind the current Kingston Police Department headquarters), which became the first Silver Lake Junior High. In 1968, the region built a new junior high school building on Route 27 in Pembroke.

After the completion of Route 3 in 1962, the Silver Lake towns – as did the South Shore generally - experienced explosive population growth, well into the 1980s. The Silver Lake campus eventually grew too small for the growing populations of the towns – their combined population nearly trebled between the founding of the district and 1970 – and by 1970, the high school was on split sessions, becoming double sessions by 1974.

In 1974 the district began construction on the Silver Lake-Pembroke Campus on Learning Lane in Pembroke. Construction took two years at a cost of $3.7 million (which was funded by Pembroke residents). At the same time, the original Silver Lake-Kingston campus underwent a major addition which added a second gymnasium, new classrooms and a new vocational wing. Silver Lake–Pembroke was scheduled to open in September 1976, but was delayed until November 1976 due to vandalism and a fire during the summer of 1976. The fire caused the new sprinkler system to flood the building's lower level, and carpeting and sheetrock had to be replaced and repainted. The school eventually housed grades 9–12 of Pembroke residents, while Kingston, Halifax and Plympton residents continued to attend at the original building.

Silver Lake graduated its largest class, of 510 students, in 1981. Attendance peaked in 1980, when enrollment in the high school was 2100 students with just over 1000 students at the junior high. Subsequently, and throughout the 1980s, enrollment declined. In 1991, the region closed the junior high building, and converted the Pembroke campus to the junior high, while the Kingston campus once again became the sole high school campus, housing students from all four towns as it had prior to 1976. Attendance dropped from 2100 in 1980 to 1260 in 1993.

Continued overcrowding in the school led Pembroke (with a population by 2000 half again what it was in 1970) to withdraw from the district and form its own independent school district in 2002; its students remained enrolled in Silver Lake until 2004.

A new high school was constructed on the site of the original building, which opened in 2004. The school is one of the most expensive standing in Massachusetts and is adjacent to the district's middle school, the Silver Lake Middle School.

The 1955 high school building stood until 2005 when it was torn down; however, the original football field, Sirrico Field, remains.

The school was cited in Boston magazine as being one of the 2008 fifty top schools in eastern Massachusetts.

== Athletics ==
The name for the Silver Lake teams is the Lakers.

In 1955 Silver Lake was a Division III school in the South Shore Conference. In 1966 it moved up to Division II and joined the Old Colony League. In 1986 it moved to Division I. The school has a football program (1980 Division III Super Bowl Champions) and was regionally known for excelling in basketball (in which it won a state title in 1960, coached by future Boston Celtics assistant coach John Killilea), hockey (in which it reached the Division II Eastern Mass Finals in 1977) and soccer (in which it won a state title in 1988).

In 2005, after the withdrawal of the town of Pembroke, Silver Lake began competing in Division II. The Lakers now compete in the Patriot League of southeastern Massachusetts.

For most of its existence, Silver Lake's chief rival was Plymouth-Carver High School, until the breakup of Plymouth-Carver into three separate high schools in 1988; thereafter, until the district's demerger, its chief rival was Bridgewater-Raynham Regional High School. The most notable current school rivalries are with Pembroke High School and Duxbury High School.

== Notable alumni ==
- Vinny deMacedo, class of 1983 - former Massachusetts state legislator.
- Ben Edlund, class of 1986 - creator of The Tick comic book series, co-creator of science-fiction television show Firefly, and former writer and executive producer on the television show Supernatural.
- Eric Flaim, class of 1985 - four-time Olympian (1988, 1992, 1994, 1998), two-time silver medalist (1500 meter long track, 1988; 5000 meter short track relay, 1994); first American to medal in two different Winter Olympic sports.
- Tim Murphy, class of 1974 - Harvard football coach.
- Joe Proctor, class of 2003 - UFC fighter.
- Pat Seltsam, class of 1982 - World Cup silver medalist speedskater.
- Kevin Stevens, class of 1983 - NHL All-Star left winger, two-time Stanley Cup champion with Pittsburgh Penguins.
- Buddy Teevens, class of 1974 - Dartmouth and Stanford football coach.
- Cleon Turner, class of 1963 - former Massachusetts state legislator.
