= Indian Pond (Kingston, Massachusetts) =

Lake of the United States of America

- Location within Massachusetts Location within the United States
- Location: Kingston and Plympton, Massachusetts
- Coordinates: 41°57′40″N 70°45′43″W
- Basin countries: United States
- Surface area: 66 acres (27 ha)
- Average depth: 3 ft (0.91 m)

Indian Pond is a 66-acre (270,000 m^{2}) shallow, infertile, warm-water pond in Kingston and Plympton, Massachusetts, west of Route 80 and north of the new U.S. Route 44 highway. The average depth of the pond is three feet. Access to the pond is off Indian Pond Road in Kingston and Brook Street in Plympton. Fishing is regarded as generally poor due to the acidity of the water and the pond's natural infertility.
