= Pembroke Friends Meetinghouse =

Historic church in Massachusetts, United States

- U.S. National Register of Historic Places
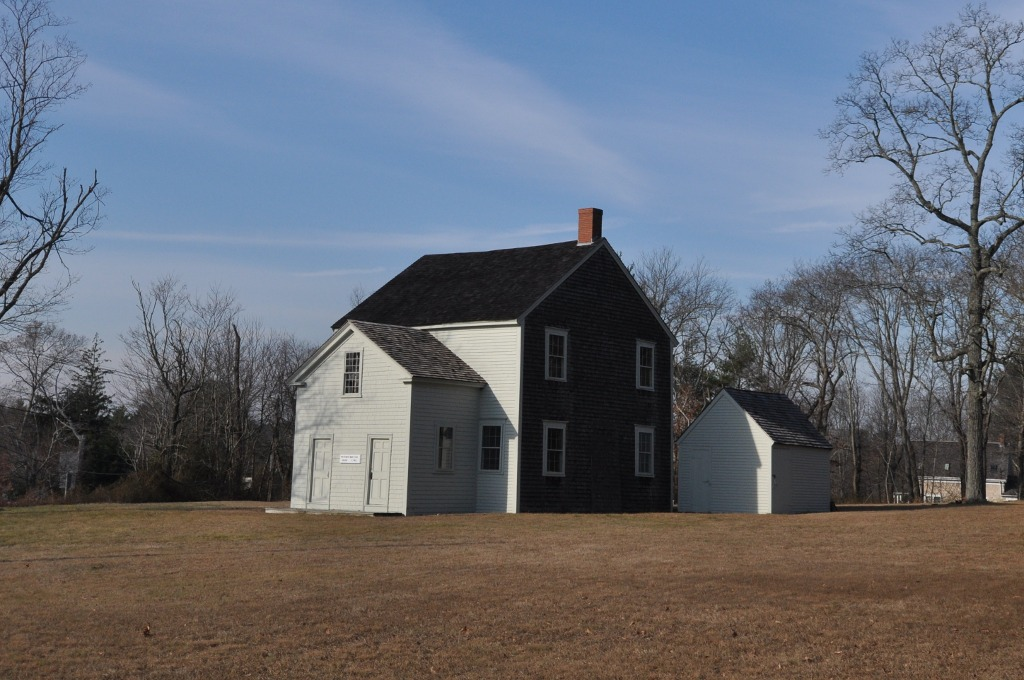

- Location within Massachusetts Location within the United States
- Location: Pembroke, Massachusetts
- Coordinates: 42°6′17″N 70°48′18″W
- Built: 1706/1833
- Architectural style: Federal
- NRHP reference No.: 06000786
- Added to NRHP: September 6, 2006

The Pembroke Friends Meetinghouse is a historic Quaker church at Washington Street and Schoosett Street in Pembroke, Plymouth County, Massachusetts.

The meeting house was built in 1706 by Robert Barker with later 19th-century additions. It is one of the oldest Quaker meetinghouses in the United States. This meetinghouse was used by local Quakers from 1706 until 1876 when the meetinghouse was closed and its members transferred to meetings in either Sandwich or New Bedford. Today the Meetinghouse is owned by the Pembroke Historical Society and has seen occasional use by area Quakers.

The building was listed on the National Register of Historic Places in 2006.

== See also ==
- National Register of Historic Places listings in Plymouth County, Massachusetts
- New Bedford Meeting House
- Swansea Friends Meetinghouse and Cemetery, a c. 1703 Quaker meeting house in Somerset, Massachusetts
