= Burrage Pond Wildlife Management Area =

Wildlife area in the United States

Coordinates: 42.021°N 70.876°W

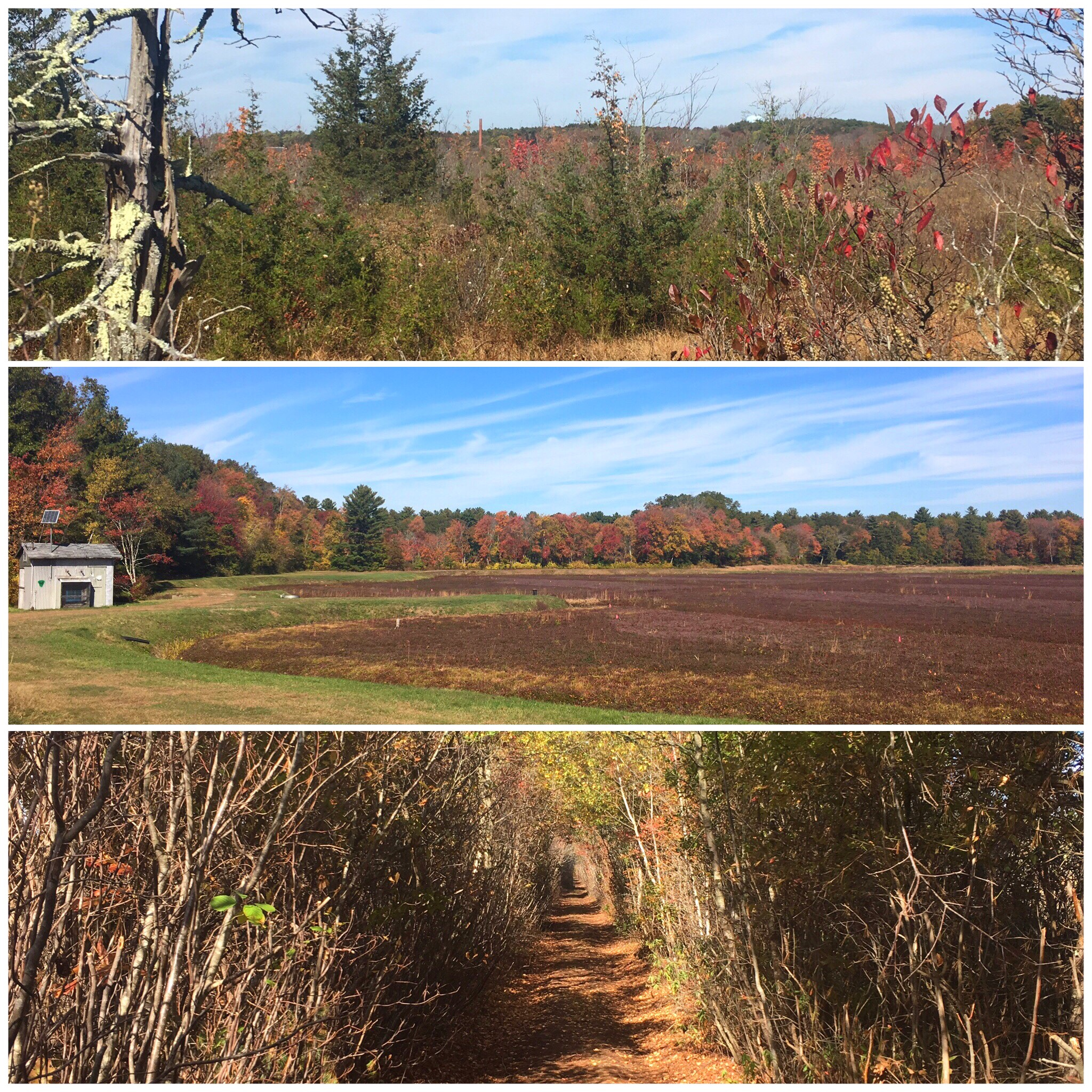

Burrage Pond Wildlife Management Area (or BPWMA) is located in the towns of Hanson and Halifax in Massachusetts, USA. The area is composed of 1,625 acres (6.58 km^{2}) of open land for public use, including hiking, biking, and birding. Hunting is permitted except on Sundays. BPWMA is made up mainly of swampy lands, old cranberry bogs (formally Bog 18, the biggest in the world), and cedar forest. It is managed by the Massachusetts Department of Fisheries and Wildlife.
