= Monponsett Pond Seaplane Base =

- IATA: none; ICAO: none; FAA LID: MA6

Summary
- Airport type: Public
- Owner: Peter Annis
- Location: Halifax, Massachusetts
- Elevation AMSL: 52 ft / 16 m
- Coordinates: 42°00′35″N 070°50′35″W

Map
- Interactive map of Monponsett Pond Seaplane Base

Runways
Direction	Length		Surface
Direction	ft	m	Surface
10/28	3,200	975	Water
17/35	4,600	1,402	Water

Statistics (2005)
- Aircraft operations: 162
- Source: Federal Aviation Administration

Monponsett Pond Seaplane Base (FAA LID: MA6) is a privately owned, public-use seaplane base located two miles (3 km) northwest of the central business district of Halifax, a town in Plymouth County, Massachusetts, United States.

== Facilities and aircraft ==
Monponsett Pond Seaplane Base has two landing areas:

- Runway 10/28: 3,200 x 300 ft. (975 x 91 m), Surface: Water
- Runway 17/35: 4,600 x 500 ft. (1,402 x 152 m), Surface: Water

For the 12-month period ending May 1, 2005, the airport had 162 general aviation aircraft operations.

== See also ==
- List of airports in Massachusetts
