= Kevin Stevens =

American ice hockey player (born 1965)

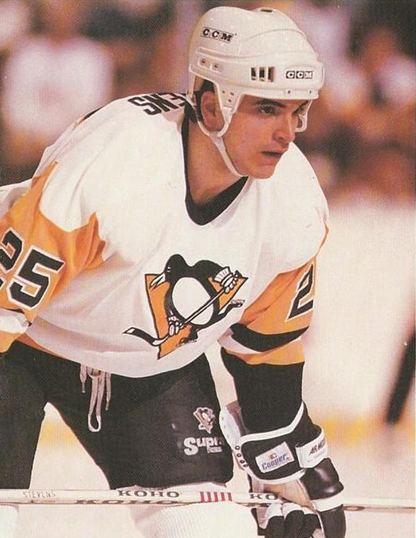
- Stevens with the Pittsburgh Penguins in 1989
- Born: April 15, 1965 (age 61) Brockton, Massachusetts, U.S.
- Height: 6 ft 3 in (191 cm)
- Weight: 230 lb (104 kg; 16 st 6 lb)
- Position: Left wing
- Shot: Left
- Played for: Pittsburgh Penguins; Boston Bruins; Los Angeles Kings; New York Rangers; Philadelphia Flyers
- National team: United States
- NHL draft: 108th overall, 1983; Los Angeles Kings
- Playing career: 1987–2002

Kevin Michael Stevens (born April 15, 1965) is an American former ice hockey player and current scout in the National Hockey League (NHL). He played left wing on a line with Mario Lemieux during the Pittsburgh Penguins' Stanley Cup championships in 1991 and 1992. During his career, he also played with the Boston Bruins, Los Angeles Kings, New York Rangers, and Philadelphia Flyers. In 2017, Stevens was named Special Assignment Scout with the Penguins hockey organization.

== Early career ==
Stevens was born in Brockton, Massachusetts, but grew up in Pembroke, Massachusetts. As a youth, he played in the 1978 Quebec International Pee-Wee Hockey Tournament with the Hobomock minor ice hockey team from Pembroke. While attending Silver Lake Regional High School in Kingston, Massachusetts, Kevin Stevens played both hockey and baseball. He was invited to try out for both the Toronto Blue Jays and the Philadelphia Phillies; however, accepting that he was not a great hitter in baseball, he decided to play hockey instead. Stevens accepted a full scholarship to play hockey for Boston College, and was drafted in the sixth round (108th overall) in the 1983 NHL draft by the Los Angeles Kings. Several months later, his rights were traded to the Pittsburgh Penguins for Anders Håkansson, a left winger from Sweden who had recently been traded to the Penguins along with Ron Meighan from the Minnesota North Stars for the Penguins' first-round pick in the 1983 draft (Brian Lawton).

Upon graduating from Boston College in 1987, Stevens joined the U.S. National Team and represented the U.S. at the 1987 World Championships and at the 1988 Winter Olympics. Stevens' play steadily improved during his time with the team and in 1987-88 he finished with 45 points in 44 games.

== NHL career ==
Stevens played a few games with the Penguins in the 1987–88 NHL season, then spent the 1988–89 NHL season jumping back and forth between the National Hockey League (NHL) and the Muskegon Lumberjacks of the International Hockey League (IHL).

Starting with the 1989–90 NHL season, Stevens became one of the top left wingers and power forwards in the league. He recorded 29 goals with 41 assists for a total of 70 points in 76 games while taking 171 penalty minutes. He started a run of 40-goal seasons with the 1990–91 campaign, which saw him score 40 to go along with 46 assists for 86 points while being named to the All-Star Game and receive NHL Second-Team honors. Stevens would prove pivotal in the 1991 Stanley Cup playoffs, leading the team in goals with 17 while contributing 16 assists. His goals saw him tied third-most for a postseason in NHL history behind Jari Kurri and Reggie Leach, who had each scored 19; no Pittsburgh player has matched Stevens for one postseason. With the team trailing 2–0 in the Prince of Wales Conference Finals to the Boston Bruins, Stevens publicly guaranteed that the Penguins would win the next four games in a row. He started the scoring in game three and scored three more goals in the next two games as the Penguins ultimately won the series in six games.

In the 1991–92 NHL season, Stevens reached his pinnacle, scoring 54 goals with 69 assists for his first 100-point season with 123, which was second only to Mario Lemieux in the entire league. His 50th goal in his 62nd game set a new mark for the fastest American-born player to reach 50 goals in a season. He also recorded 254 penalty minutes during the season; alongside Gary Roberts, Stevens became the first group of players to record a 50-goal season with 200 penalty minutes. His 123 points that year also set a record for the most points by an American-born player and a left wing in one season; Pat LaFontaine passed him in points the following season, but Stevens still maintains the record for American-born players in the left wing position. He finished 8th in the Hart Trophy voting and was named to the First Team on the NHL All-Star Team. During the Pittsburgh Penguins' back-to-back Stanley Cup seasons, Stevens was the only Penguin to play in every regular season and playoff game. He scored 13 goals in the 1992 Stanley Cup playoffs. On May 21, 1992, during game three of the Conference Final against the Boston Bruins, Stevens became the 25th player in NHL history to score three goals in a single playoff period. Scoring a hat trick in the first period, he would add one more goal before the end of the game. The Penguins swept the Bruins then swept the Chicago Blackhawks to win their second straight Stanley Cup.

The 1992–93 season saw him reach 55 goals and 56 assists for 111 points in 72 games and saw him named to the Second Team. His 55 goals tied the mark set by Jimmy Carson in the 1987–88 season for most goals in a single NHL season by a United States-born player. That record would stand for another 29 years before being broken by Auston Matthews on April 7, 2022 (Matthews later broke Stevens' record for fastest 50-goal season in 2024). On May 14, 1993, the Penguins were playing the New York Islanders in game seven of the Patrick Division finals. Early in the first period, Stevens skated in and checked Islanders' defenseman Rich Pilon, hitting Pilon's visor with so much force that he knocked himself unconscious. Unable to soften the blow upon landing, Stevens landed face first on the ice, shattering most of the bones in his face and required extensive reconstructive surgery. He was on the ice for six minutes before being stretchered off. Doctors cut an incision below his hairline from ear-to-ear, which was later closed with over 100 stitches, peeled back his skin and reassembled the bones in Stevens' face with the use of metal plates. Stevens came back to have one more strong season for the Penguins, in 1993–94 (41 goals, 47 assists), before being traded the next year.

Stevens was sent to the Boston Bruins in 1995 along with Shawn McEachern for Glen Murray and Bryan Smolinski. Stevens was never given a chance to succeed in Boston except in preseason when he was paired with Adam Oates and Cam Neely. Stevens did not get along with head coach Steve Kasper and found himself playing on the third or fourth line. The enmity went to the point where Kasper benched not only Stevens but also Neely during a January 3 game. 22 days later, he was traded to the Los Angeles Kings for Rick Tocchet. In 61 total games with Boston and Los Angeles, he had 13 goals with 23 assists in 61 games. In his only full season with Los Angeles, he had 14 goals with 20 assists in 69 games.

On August 28, 1997, Stevens was traded to the New York Rangers for Luc Robitaille. He had one more 20-goal season in the 1998–99 season with 23 in 81 games. The 1999–2000 season saw him struggle to just 8 points in 38 games. In January 2000, following a game against the St. Louis Blues, he was caught in a Collinsville, Illinois motel with a prostitute and crack cocaine. After this event, Stevens entered the NHL/NHLPA Substance Abuse and Behavioral Health Program.

After being released from the program, he latched onto to the Philadelphia Flyers in the 2000–01 season, playing 23 games. He was traded to the Penguins in January 2001. His return to Pittsburgh revitalized Stevens, where he impressed by scoring 23 points in 32 games reuniting with his former line mates Mario Lemieux and Jaromir Jagr, and adding a further six points in 17 playoff games as the Penguins reached the Eastern Conference Final. He then re-signed with the Penguins for the 2001-02 season. However, after struggling with just one goal in 32 games, he left the team before a game in Buffalo in January, 2002 to fly back home to Pittsburgh and discuss his future with his wife. He ultimately did not return to the team, and retired from professional hockey.

Stevens returned the Penguins in an off-ice role as a talent scout from 2005 to 2012, including the 2008-09 NHL season, when the Penguins (and Stevens) won their third Stanley Cup. In 2017, he was hired again by the team, this time as a Special Assignment Scout.

== Post-NHL ==
In 2011, Stevens left the Pittsburgh Penguins organization as a pro scout to spend more time with his family. He coached youth hockey including a traveling team in the Boston area. In June 2015, his son, Luke Stevens, was drafted by the Carolina Hurricanes 5th round, 126th overall pick. Luke played four years of college hockey at Yale University, but was ultimately not offered a contract by the Hurricanes, and signed a minor league contract with the Wilkes-Barre/Scranton Penguins of the AHL in August 2020.

In May 2016, Stevens and a co-defendant were charged with conspiracy and possession with intent to distribute oxycodone. In May 2017, Stevens entered a guilty plea in a Boston federal court and was sentenced to probation, community service and a $10,000 fine. Stevens admitted to being addicted to prescription drugs since his injury in the 1993 playoffs, an addiction that destroyed his marriage and his post-playing career in hockey. He later revealed he had begun using drugs recreationally earlier, and recovering from the hit caused it to escalate to a full-blown addiction.

On January 13, 2018, Stevens' recovery from addiction and his subsequent community service was presented in a 30-minute documentary entitled "Shattered" which aired on Sportsnet, a Canadian sports channel. Stevens and his sister Kelli Wilson co-founded the Power Forward foundation to combat addiction through education, de-stigmatizing, and recovery programs. It has supported efforts to use therapy dogs in sober homes through a project called D.O.E.R. (Dog Ownership Enhancing Recovery).

On September 5, 2024, Stevens was announced alongside Matt Cullen, Brianna Decker, Frederic McLaughlin, and the 2002 USA Paralympics Sled Hockey Team to be enshrined into the United States Hockey Hall of Fame as the Class of 2024 on December 4.

== Awards and honors ==
Award	Year
All-Hockey East First Team	1986–87
AHCA West second-team All-American	1986–87

- Stanley Cup champion: 1991 and 1992
- NHL First All-Star team: 1992
- NHL Second All-Star team: 1991, 1993
- NHL All-Star Game: 1991, 1992 and 1993
- United States Hockey Hall of Fame: 2024
- Pittsburgh Penguins Hall of Fame: 2025

== Transactions ==
- September 9, 1983– Traded by the Los Angeles Kings to the Pittsburgh Penguins in exchange for Anders Hakansson.
- August 2, 1995– Traded by the Pittsburgh Penguins, along with Shawn McEachern, to the Boston Bruins in exchange for Glen Murray, Bryan Smolinski and Boston's 1996 third round draft choice.
- January 25, 1996– Traded by the Boston Bruins to the Los Angeles Kings in exchange for Rick Tocchet.
- August 28, 1997– Traded by the Los Angeles Kings to the New York Rangers in exchange for Luc Robitaille.
- July 7, 2000– Signed as free agent with the Philadelphia Flyers.
- January 14, 2001– Traded by the Philadelphia Flyers to the Pittsburgh Penguins in exchange for John Slaney.

== Career statistics ==
=== Regular season and playoffs ===
Bold indicates led league

			Regular season					Playoffs
Season	Team	League	GP	G	A	Pts	PIM	GP	G	A	Pts	PIM
1982–83	Silver Lake Regional High School	HS-MA	18	24	27	51	—	—	—	—	—	—
1983–84	Boston College	ECAC	37	6	14	20	36	—	—	—	—	—
1984–85	Boston College	ECAC	40	13	23	36	36	—	—	—	—	—
1985–86	Boston College	ECAC	42	17	27	44	56	—	—	—	—	—
1986–87	Boston College	ECAC	39	35	35	70	54	—	—	—	—	—
1987–88	United States	Intl	44	22	23	45	52	—	—	—	—	—
1987–88	Pittsburgh Penguins	NHL	16	5	2	7	8	—	—	—	—	—
1988–89	Muskegon Lumberjacks	IHL	45	24	41	65	113	—	—	—	—	—
1988–89	Pittsburgh Penguins	NHL	24	12	3	15	19	11	3	7	10	16
1989–90	Pittsburgh Penguins	NHL	76	29	41	70	171	—	—	—	—	—
1990–91	Pittsburgh Penguins	NHL	80	40	46	86	133	24	**17**	16	33	53
1991–92	Pittsburgh Penguins	NHL	80	54	69	123	254	21	13	15	28	28
1992–93	Pittsburgh Penguins	NHL	72	55	56	111	177	12	5	11	16	22
1993–94	Pittsburgh Penguins	NHL	83	41	47	88	155	6	1	1	2	10
1994–95	Pittsburgh Penguins	NHL	27	15	12	27	51	12	4	7	11	21
1995–96	Boston Bruins	NHL	41	10	13	23	49	—	—	—	—	—
1995–96	Los Angeles Kings	NHL	20	3	10	13	22	—	—	—	—	—
1996–97	Los Angeles Kings	NHL	69	14	20	34	96	—	—	—	—	—
1997–98	New York Rangers	NHL	80	14	27	41	130	—	—	—	—	—
1998–99	New York Rangers	NHL	81	23	20	43	64	—	—	—	—	—
1999–2000	New York Rangers	NHL	38	3	5	8	43	—	—	—	—	—
2000–01	Philadelphia Flyers	NHL	23	2	7	9	18	—	—	—	—	—
2000–01	Pittsburgh Penguins	NHL	32	8	15	23	55	17	3	3	6	20
2001–02	Pittsburgh Penguins	NHL	32	1	4	5	25	—	—	—	—	—
NHL totals			874	329	397	726	1,470	103	46	60	106	170

=== International ===
Medal record

Representing United States

Ice hockey

World Championships
Bronze medal – third place	1996 Vienna	

Year	Team	Event	Results	GP	G	A	Pts	PIM
1987	United States	WC	7th	8	1	1	2	10
1988	United States	OG	7th	6	1	3	4	2
1990	United States	WC	5th	10	5	2	7	18
1996	United States	WC	3rd place, bronze medalist(s)	8	4	3	7	12
Senior totals				32	11	9	20	42

== See also ==
- List of NHL players with 100-point seasons
