= Bradford House (Kingston, Massachusetts) =

Historic house in Massachusetts, United States

- U.S. National Register of Historic Places
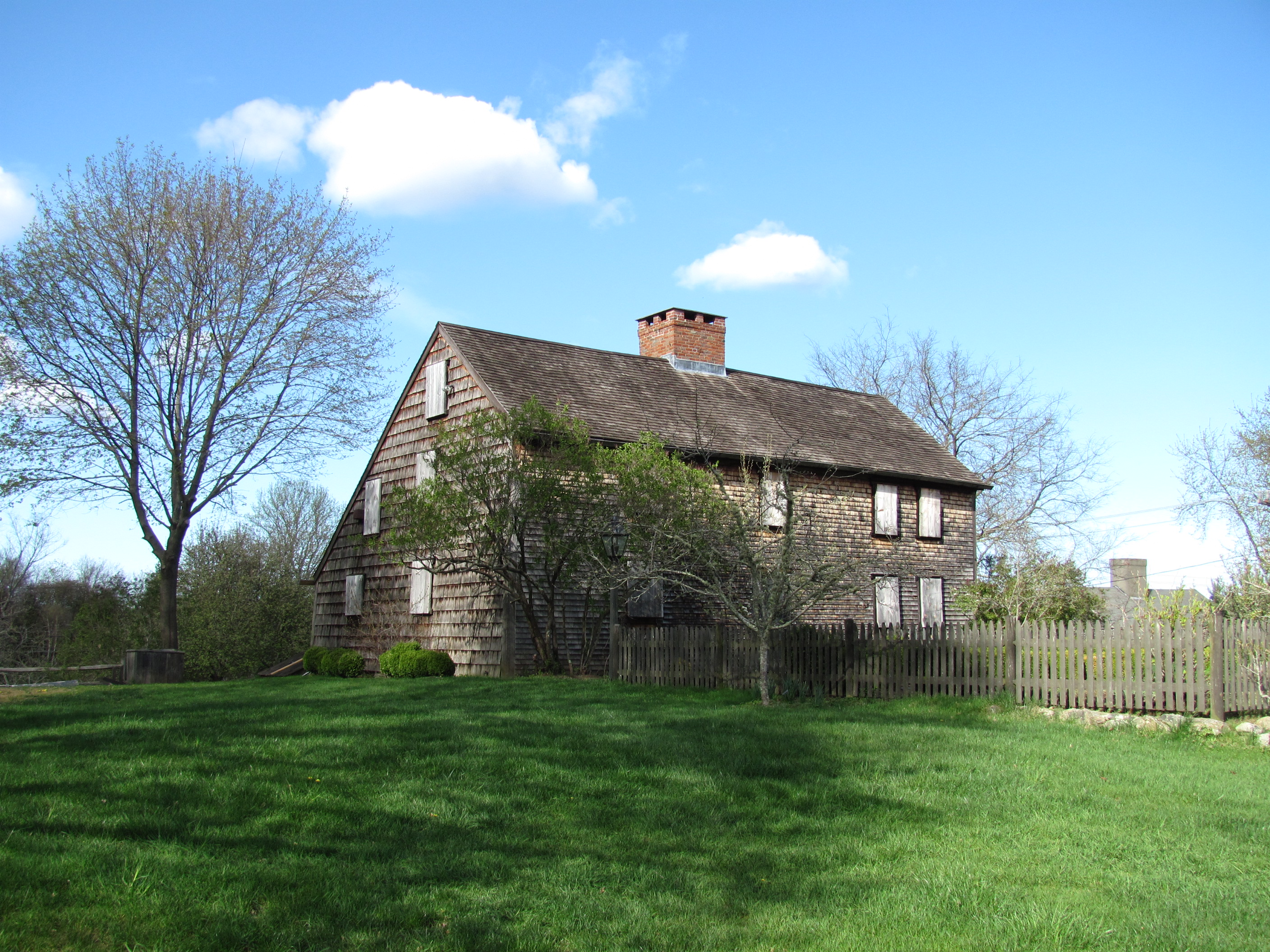
- Bradford House

- Location within Massachusetts Location within the United States
- Location: Kingston, Massachusetts
- Coordinates: 41°59′17″N 70°43′27″W
- Area: 1.4 acres (0.57 ha)
- Built: 1714
- Architect: Dow, George Francis
- Architectural style: Colonial, Colonial Revival
- NRHP reference No.: 06000128
- Added to NRHP: March 15, 2006

The Bradford House, also known as the Major John Bradford Homestead, is a historic house at 50 Landing Road in Kingston, Massachusetts. The Jones River Village Historical Society owns the house, and operates it as a historic house museum. The oldest portion of this 2 1/2-story wood-frame house was built c. 1714; this was the western portion of the house, including what is now the central chimney. Documentary evidence suggests the building was expanded to its present width c. 1750. The house was restored to its 18th-century appearance in 1921 by George Francis Dow, around the time it was purchased by the Jones River Village Historical Society. The property includes an English barn that was moved to the site in 2002.

The house was listed on the National Register of Historic Places in 2006.

== See also ==
- National Register of Historic Places listings in Plymouth County, Massachusetts
