= Winnetuxet River =

Coordinates: 41°58′03″N 70°54′27″W

Location
- Country: United States

Physical characteristics
- Source
  - location: Unnamed pond near Cole Mill, Carver, Massachusetts
- Mouth
  - location: Taunton River
- Length: 12.1 miles (19.5 km)

The Winnetuxet River is a 12.1-mile-long (19.5 km) river in southeastern Massachusetts. It flows west from an unnamed pond near Cole Mill in Carver, through Plympton and Halifax, to the Taunton River.
