= Christopher Prince =

Canadian politician

Christopher Prince (1729 – December 25, 1799) was a merchant, farmer and political figure in Nova Scotia. He represented Granville Township in the Nova Scotia House of Assembly from 1772 to 1785.

He was born in Kingston, Massachusetts, the son of Job Prince and Abigail Kimball. In 1756, he married Mary Foster. Prince came to Nova Scotia in 1760, settling in Digby. He served as justice of the peace, colonel in the militia and commissioner of roads for Annapolis County. Prince married Ann Payson after the death of his first wife. He was first elected to the provincial assembly in a 1772 by-election. Prince moved to Wilmot around 1792.
