= Massachusetts Route 36 =

State highway in Plymouth County, Massachusetts, US

Route 36
- Route 36 highlighted in red

Route information
- Maintained by MassDOT
- Length: 5.44 mi (8.75 km)

Major junctions
- South end: Route 106 in Halifax
- North end: Route 14 in Pembroke

Location
- Country: United States
- State: Massachusetts
- Counties: Plymouth

Highway system
- Massachusetts State Highway System; Interstate; US; State
← Route 35	→ Route 37

Route 36 is a 5.44-mile-long (8.75 km) north–south state highway in southeastern Massachusetts. Its southern terminus is at Route 106 in Halifax and its northern terminus is at Route 14 in Pembroke.

== Route description ==
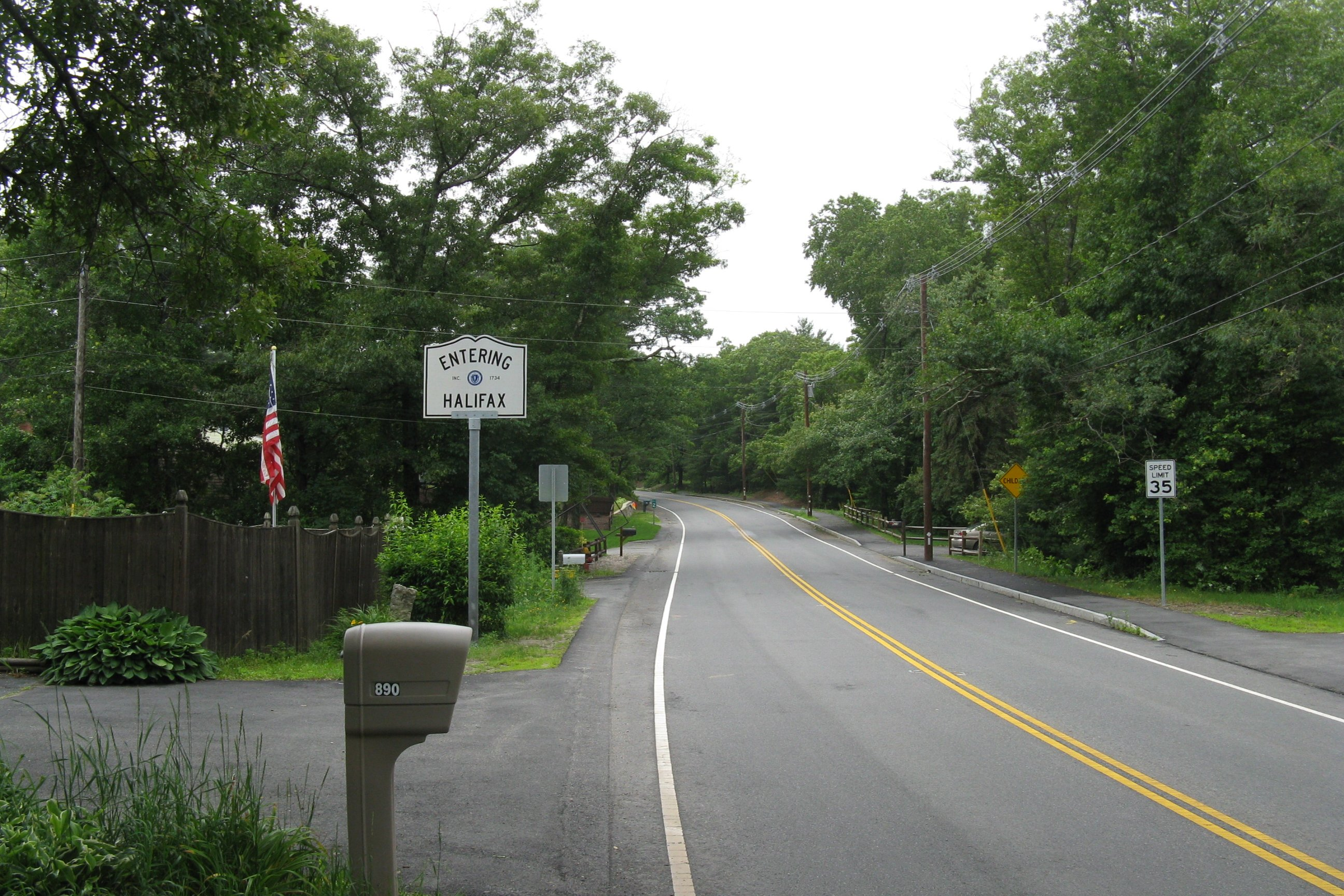
Route 36 southbound entering Halifax

From its terminus at Route 106 in Halifax, Route 36 abuts the eastern shore of East Monponsett Pond. The highway crosses the Plymouth Branch at Halifax station. The highway runs near Silver Lake to the west and crosses Route 27 before ending at Route 14 just south of Pembroke Center. This road is locally famous as the location of the former Hobomock Inn, a tavern linked to the famous Massachusetts politician, James Michael Curley.

== Major intersections ==
The entire route is in Plymouth County.

Location	mi	km	Destinations	Notes
Halifax	0.00	0.00	Route 106 – Halifax, Bridgewater, Kingston	Southern terminus
Pembroke	3.20	5.15	Route 27 – Whitman, Brockton, Kingston, Plymouth	
Pembroke	5.44	8.75	Route 14 to Route 53 – Hanson, Pembroke	Northern terminus
1.000 mi = 1.609 km; 1.000 km = 0.621 mi
