= Halifax, Massachusetts =

- Town
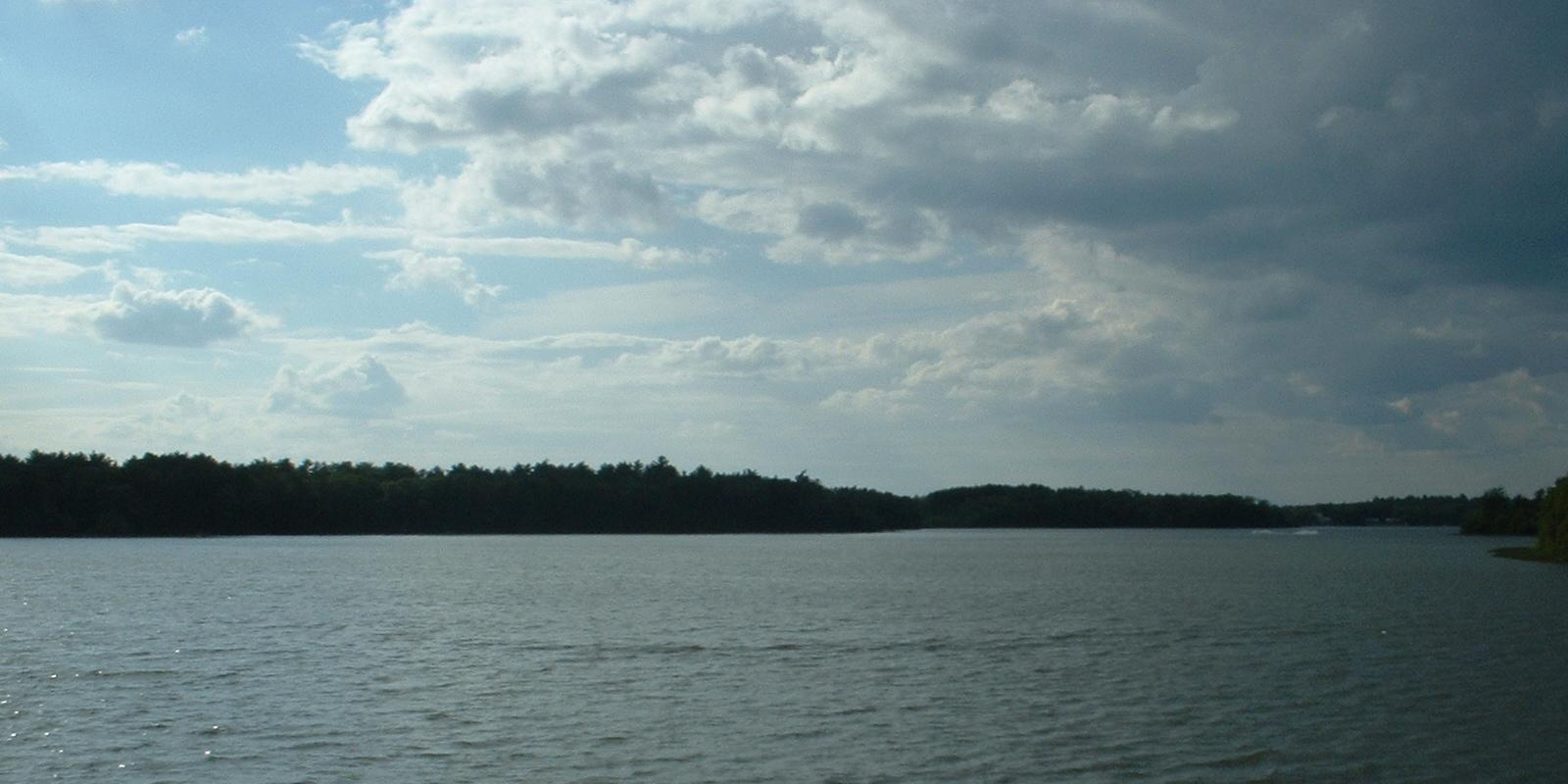
- West Monponsett Pond

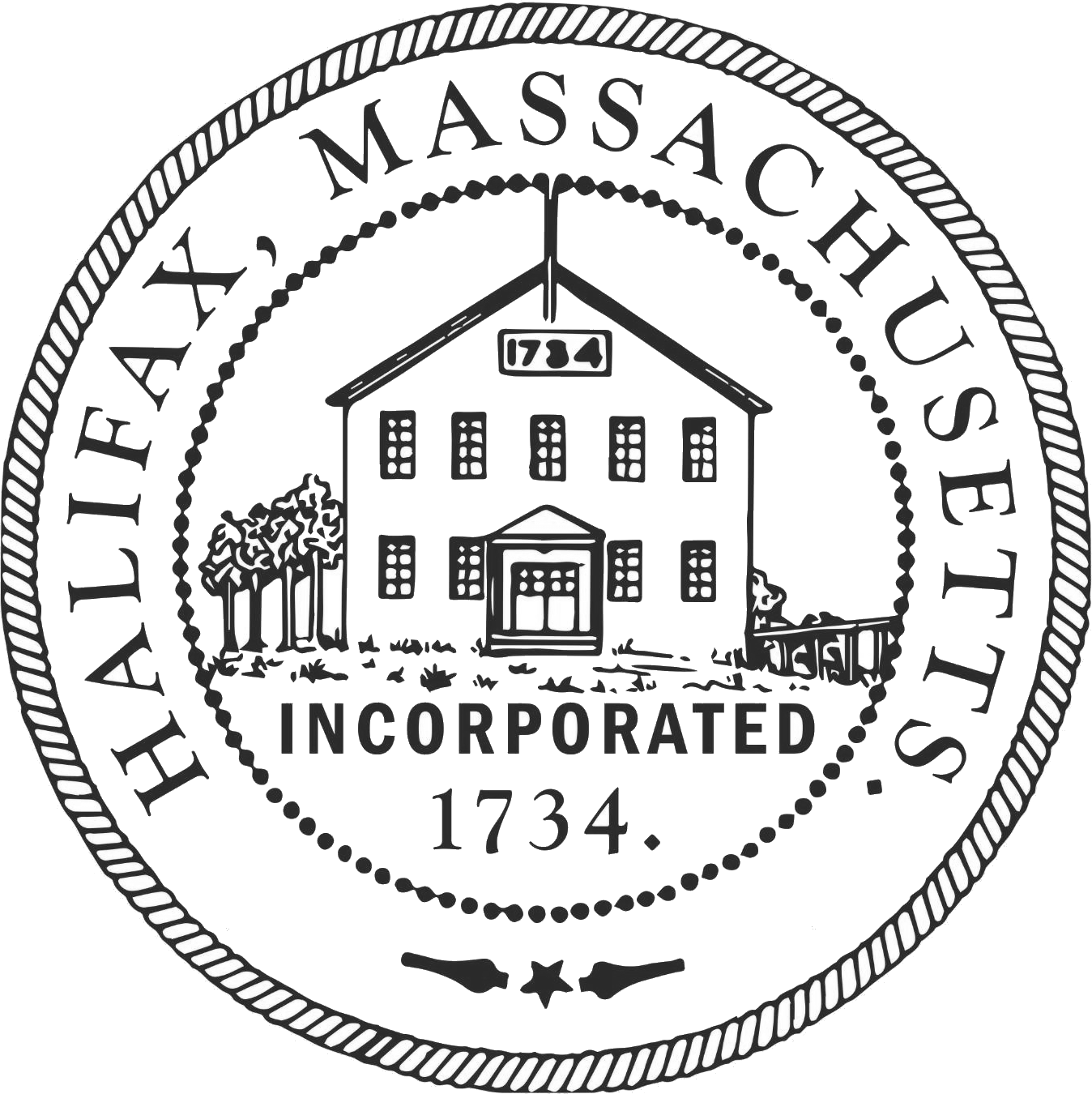
- Seal

- Location in Plymouth County, Massachusetts
- Coordinates: 41°59′28″N 70°51′45″W
- Country: United States
- State: Massachusetts
- County: Plymouth
- Settled: 1670
- Incorporated: 1734

Government
  - Type: Open town meeting

Area
  - Total: 17.3 sq mi (44.9 km^{2})
  - Land: 16.1 sq mi (41.8 km^{2})
  - Water: 1.2 sq mi (3.1 km^{2})
- Elevation: 89 ft (27 m)

Population (2020)
  - Total: 7,749
  - Density: 480/sq mi (185/km^{2})
- Time zone: UTC-5 (Eastern)
  - Summer (DST): UTC-4 (Eastern)
- ZIP code: 02338
- Area code: 339 / 781
- FIPS code: 25-27795
- GNIS feature ID: 0618340
- Website: www.halifaxma.gov

Halifax is a town in Plymouth County, Massachusetts, United States. The population was 7,749 at the 2020 census.

== History ==
Halifax was first settled by Europeans, most notably the Bosworth family from Bosworth Fields in England, in 1669, growing with lumbering and agriculture. It was officially separated from the town of Plympton and incorporated in 1734, and was named for Halifax, West Yorkshire, England. The town was part of an early effort to create a canal between Buzzards Bay and Massachusetts Bay, when in 1795 a canal was proposed between the Taunton River and North River; the plan never succeeded, although the town's sawmills continued to grow, as did cranberry production, iron furnaces and a wool mill. The railroad came in the nineteenth century, providing access for people from the city to the shores of Silver Lake and the Monponsett Ponds. Today the town is mostly residential, with a small retail area growing at the center of town.

== Geography ==
According to the United States Census Bureau, the town has a total area of 17.3 square miles (45 km^{2}), of which 16.1 square miles (42 km^{2}) is land and 1.2 square miles (3.1 km^{2}), or 6.81%, is water. Statistically, Halifax is the 235th largest town in the Commonwealth by land area, and is eighteenth out of the twenty-seven communities in Plymouth County. Halifax is bordered by Hanson to the north, Pembroke to the northeast, Plympton to the southeast, Middleborough to the southwest, and Bridgewater and East Bridgewater to the west. Halifax is approximately 12 miles (19 km) west of Plymouth, 13 miles (21 km) southeast of Brockton, and 33 miles (53 km) south-southeast of Boston.

Much of Halifax's geography is dictated by water. The town lies on the western banks of Silver Lake, and is also the site of Robbins Pond, Indian Trail Reservoir and Burrage Pond in the west of town, and East and West Monponsett Ponds near the center of town. The two Monponsett Ponds are separated by a narrow strip of land, barely 150 feet (46 m) wide in some spots, and this strip of land also accommodates part of MA Route 58. Part of the town's border with Bridgewater is defined by the Taunton River, which also spawns the Winnetuxet River and several other brooks into town. And, on either side of the Monponsett Ponds lie swamps, with Great Cedar Swamp to the west and Peterson Swamp to the east. The town also shares a small conservation area with neighboring Plympton and the larger Burrage Pond Wildlife Management Area with Hanson.

== Demographics ==
Historical population
| Year | Pop. | ±% |
|---|---|---|
| 1790 | 664 | — |
| 1850 | 784 | +18.1% |
| 1860 | 766 | −2.3% |
| 1870 | 619 | −19.2% |
| 1880 | 542 | −12.4% |
| 1890 | 562 | +3.7% |
| 1900 | 522 | −7.1% |
| 1910 | 550 | +5.4% |
| 1920 | 563 | +2.4% |
| 1930 | 728 | +29.3% |
| 1940 | 867 | +19.1% |
| 1950 | 944 | +8.9% |
| 1960 | 1,599 | +69.4% |
| 1970 | 3,537 | +121.2% |
| 1980 | 5,513 | +55.9% |
| 1990 | 6,526 | +18.4% |
| 2000 | 7,500 | +14.9% |
| 2010 | 7,518 | +0.2% |
| 2020 | 7,749 | +3.1% |
| 2024* | 7,786 | +0.5% |
* = population estimate. Source: United States census records and Population Estimates Program data.

As of the census of 2000, there were 7,500 people, 2,758 households, and 2,054 families residing in the town. The population density was 464.5 inhabitants per square mile (179.3/km^{2}). There were 2,841 housing units at an average density of 175.9 per square mile (67.9/km^{2}). The racial makeup of the town was 98.13% White, 0.31% African American, 0.03% Native American, 0.27% Asian, 0.48% from other races, and 0.79% from two or more races. Hispanic or Latino of any race were 0.55% of the population.

There were 2,758 households out of which 34.8% had children under the age of 18 living with them, 61.3% were married couples living together, 9.9% had a female householder with no husband present, and 25.5% were non-families. 21.3% of all households were made up of individuals and 10.9% had someone living alone who was 65 years of age or older. The average household size was 2.72 and the average family size was 3.18.

In the town, the population was spread out with 25.4% under the age of 18, 6.3% from 18 to 24, 31.4% from 25 to 44, 24.1% from 45 to 64, and 12.8% who were 65 years of age or older. The median age was 38 years. For every 100 females, there were 93.5 males. For every 100 females age 18 and over, there were 89.7 males.

The median income for a household in the town was $57,015, and the median income for a family was $65,461. Males had a median income of $47,788 versus $31,200 for females. The per capita income for the town was $23,738. About 1.8% of families and 3.3% of the population were below the poverty line, including 4.5% of those under age 18 and 5.9% of those age 65 or over.

Statistically speaking, Halifax is the 204th largest community in the Commonwealth in terms of population, and 186th in terms of population density. Both are below the state average and state median.

== Government ==
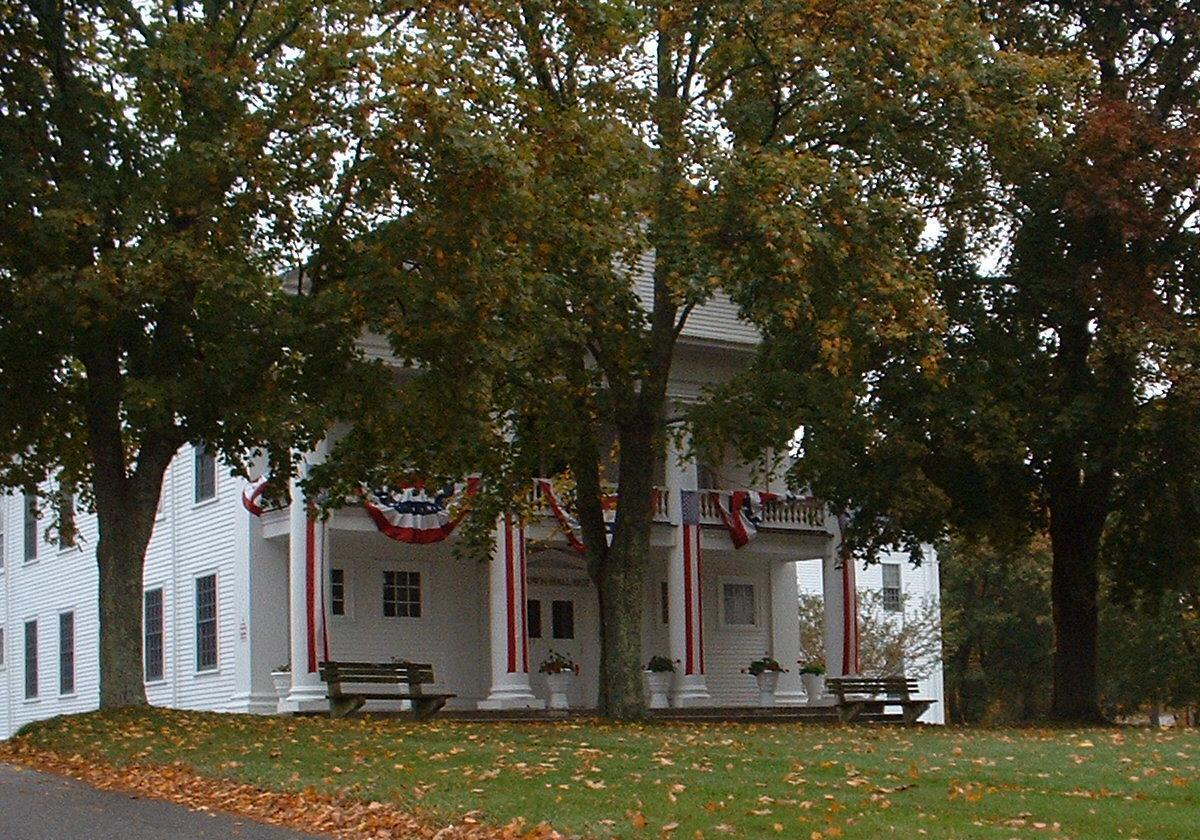
Halifax Town Hall

=== Local government ===
Halifax is governed by the open town meeting form of government, led by a board of selectmen and a town administrator. Halifax has its own police and fire departments, both of which are headquartered near the town center. The town has its own ambulance service, with the nearest hospitals being in Plymouth and Brockton. The town's post office is also located in the town center, as is the Holmes Public Library. The town also operates a beach on West Monponsett Pond, and one boat landing each on the two Monponsett Ponds.

=== Federal and state representation ===
Halifax is a part of Massachusetts's 9th congressional district, represented by Democrat William R. Keating since January 2013. The state's senior (Class I) senator, since January 2013, is Democrat Elizabeth Warren. The state's junior (Class II) senator, since July 2013, is Democrat Ed Markey.

Halifax is represented in the Massachusetts House of Representatives by the Twelfth Plymouth District; the Twelfth includes Kingston, Plympton and portions of Duxbury, Middleborough and Plymouth. The town is represented in the Massachusetts Senate as a part of the Second Plymouth and Bristol district, which includes Brockton, Hanover, Hanson, Whitman and portions of East Bridgewater and Easton. The town is patrolled by the Fourth (Middleborough) Barracks of Troop D of the Massachusetts State Police.

== Education ==
Halifax is a member of the Silver Lake Regional School District, along with Plympton and Kingston. The three towns operate their own elementary schools, with middle school students attending Silver Lake Regional Middle School and high school students attending Silver Lake Regional High School, both of which are in Kingston. Halifax Elementary School is located between the library and fire station in the town center, and serves students from kindergarten through sixth grade. The high school operates its own vocational division, so there is no agreement with any regional vocational schools. Halifax has no private schools; the nearest are in Kingston and Bridgewater.

== Transportation ==
The two major routes through town are Routes 58 and 106, which meet just east of the town center and south of the Monponsett Ponds (Route 58, in fact, is the route which crosses the ponds). To the east of East Monponsett Pond, Route 36's southern terminus meets Route 106. Route 105's northern terminus is 1½ miles west of the intersection of Routes 58 and 106, at Route 106.

Halifax is served by its station on the Kingston Line of the MBTA Commuter Rail system. There is no air service in the town, although small seaplanes do land on East Monponsett Pond. Cranland Airport is a small private air strip in neighboring Hanson. The nearest regional air service is at Plymouth Municipal Airport, and the nearest national and international air service is at Logan International Airport in Boston.

== Media ==
- The Patriot Ledger
- The Halifax/Plympton Reporter
- Plympton-Halifax Express

== Notable people ==
- Joshua Cushman, congressman
- Alexander Parris, architect
- Warren G. Phillips, educator and author
