= Silver Lake (Plymouth County, Massachusetts) =

- Location within Massachusetts Location within the United States
- Location: Pembroke, Kingston, and Plympton, Massachusetts
- Coordinates: 42°00′48″N 70°47′18″W
- Type: reservoir
- Primary inflows: Tubbs Meadow Brook
- Primary outflows: Jones River
- Basin countries: United States
- Surface area: 640 acres (2.6 km^{2})
- Surface elevation: 46 ft (14 m)
- Settlements: Silver Lake

Silver Lake is a 640-acre (2.6 km^{2}) lake in Pembroke, Kingston, and Plympton, Massachusetts, south of Route 27 and east of Route 36. The Pembroke/Plympton town line is entirely within the lake, and a portion of the western shoreline of the lake is the town line with Halifax.

== Description ==
The lake is the principal water supply for the City of Brockton, whose water treatment plant is on Route 36 in Halifax. The inflow of the pond is Tubbs Meadow Brook, and the pond is the headwaters of the Jones River. Occasionally, water is diverted into Silver Lake from Monponsett Pond in Halifax and Furnace Pond in Pembroke (through Tubbs Meadow Brook) whenever there is a water shortage. Although the lake is a reservoir, which prevents recreational activities to keep the drinking water clean, the water from the diversions are not and can pump in contaminated water. Monponsett Pond, in particular, has reoccurring toxic algae growths which get transferred into the lake.

The lake is supposed to be the main source of the Jones River by contributing about 20 percent of the river's flow, but the Forge Pond Dam near its base lets out minimal, in some years no, water to the river. This also prevents migratory aquatic animals from reaching the lake. Brockton prefers to keep the dam to have more accessible water.

Access to the pond is through Silver Lake Sanctuary, a 92-acre (370,000 m^{2}) property where one can walk, hike and fish, which is located at the end of Barses Lane, off Route 27 in Kingston.

== History ==
Silver Lake used to be called the Jones River Pond, but its name was changed to Silver Lake in the 1800s in a marketing effort to sell more ice from it.

In the late 19th century, Silver Lake hosted rowing competitions, which drew thousands of spectators, many arriving via trains from Boston. The return train from a competition held on October 8, 1878, was involved in an accident in Quincy, Massachusetts, which resulted in 19 deaths, including one of the competitors in that day's rowing event.

== Silver Lake village ==
Coordinates: 42°00′15″N 70°47′37″W

Silver Lake is also the name of a village southeast of the lake in Kingston at the intersection of Grove Street and Lake Street, near the Kingston/Plympton town line. Silver Lake Regional High School is located north of the village on Route 27.

The name has also been incorporated into numerous businesses and organizations in the area.
