= HMS Nancy =

Three ships of the British Royal Navy have been named HMS Nancy.

- HMS Nancy (1794) was a 72-ton fireship bought in April 1794 and sold in December 1801.
- HMS Nancy (1808) was a 16-gun brig purchased in South America in 1808 (confirmed in 1809) and sold in 1813.
- HMS Nancy was a mercantile schooner launched at Detroit in 1789 that served the Provincial Marine as a supply ship during the War of 1812. The Royal Navy acquired her from the Provincial Marine in 1814; her crew scuttled her on 14 August 1814 to prevent her capture.

== See also ==
- HM Hired armed cutter Nancy
