= Kingston, Massachusetts =

- Town
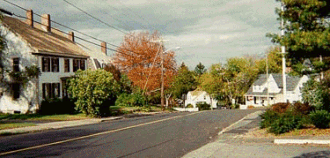
- Green street

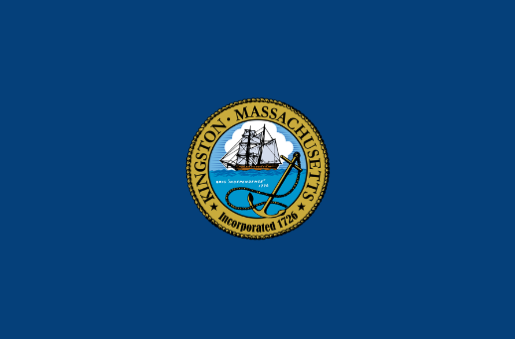
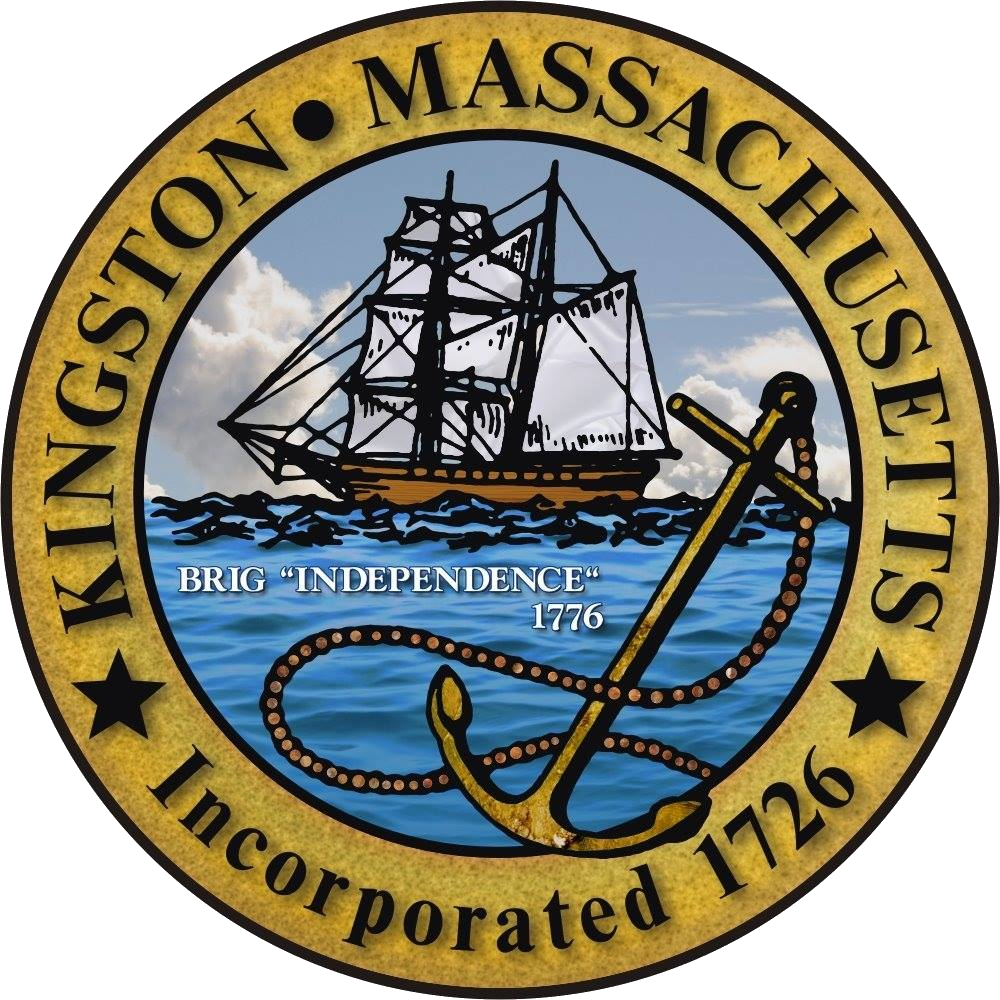
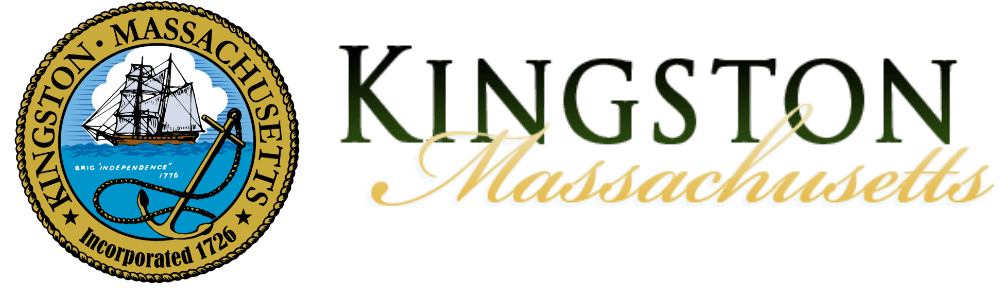
- Flag Seal Logo

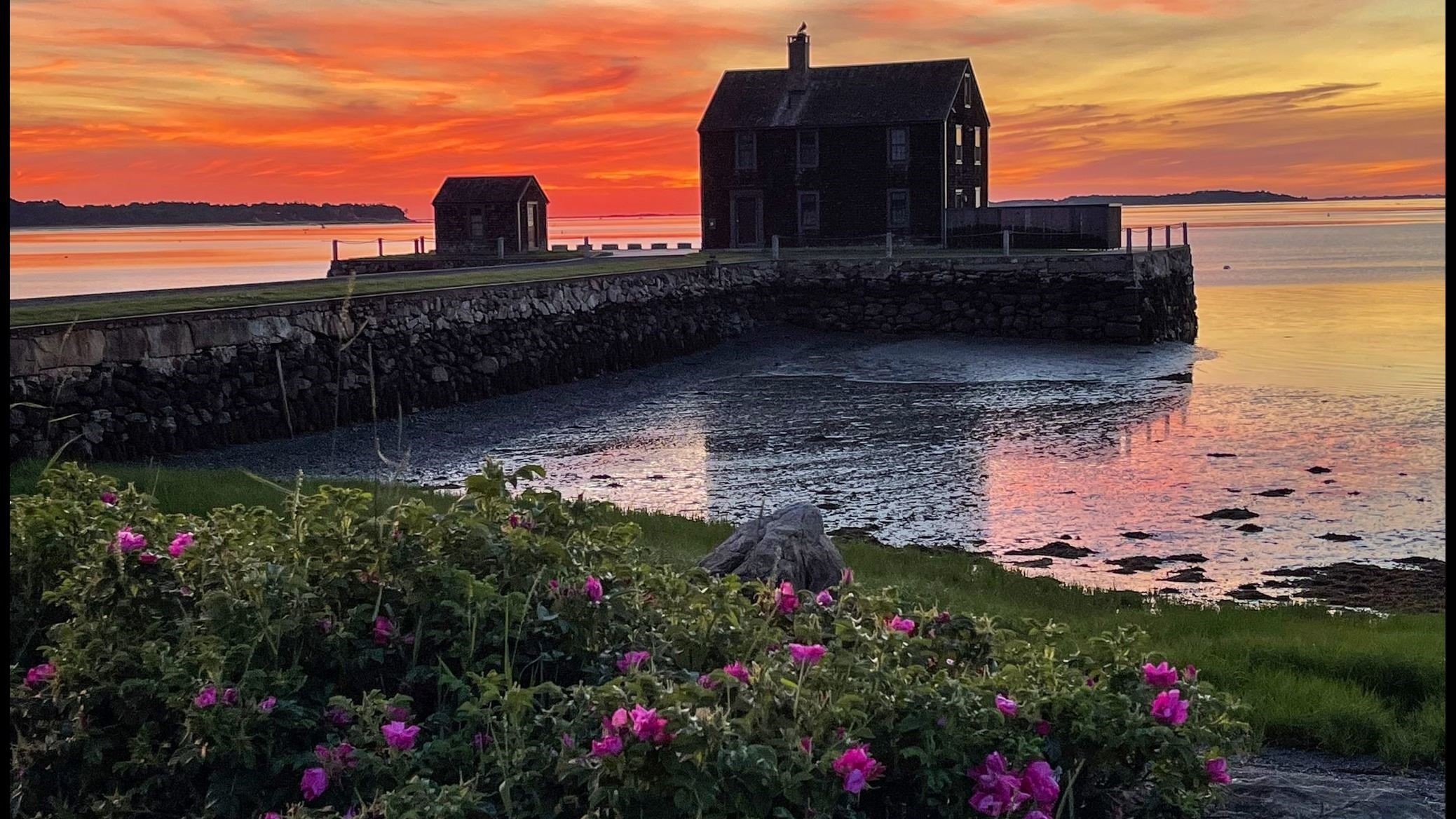
- Nickname: Delano's Wharf (Kingston Bay)

- Location in Plymouth County in Massachusetts
- Coordinates: 41.9925°N 70.7265°W
- Country: United States
- State: Massachusetts
- County: Plymouth
- Settled: 1620
- Incorporated: 1726

Government
  - Type: Open town meeting
  - Town Administrator: Scott Lambiase
  - Board of Selectmen: Kimberley A. Emberg; Joseph P. Cunningham Jr; Carl Pike; Sheila Vaughn; Melissa Bateman

Area
  - Total: 20.5 sq mi (53.1 km^{2})
  - Land: 18.6 sq mi (48.3 km^{2})
  - Water: 1.9 sq mi (4.8 km^{2})
- Elevation: 112 ft (34 m)

Population (2020)
  - Total: 13,708
  - Density: 735/sq mi (284/km^{2})
- Time zone: UTC-5 (Eastern)
  - Summer (DST): UTC-4 (Eastern)
- ZIP code: 02364
- Area code: 339 / 781
- FIPS code: 25-33220
- GNIS feature ID: 0619469
- Website: www.kingstonma.gov

Kingston is a coastal town in Plymouth County, Massachusetts, United States. The population was 13,708 at the 2020 census. It contains the census-designated place of the same name.

== History ==
Before European settlers arrived, Kingston was within the tribal homeland of the Wampanoag people. Several years before the Mayflower had landed in Plymouth, during the Native American epidemic of 1616 to 1619, the Wampanoag population was severely damaged from a rapidly spreading pandemics due to earlier contacts with Europeans. Several ancient Native American burial sites have been located within the borders of Kingston.

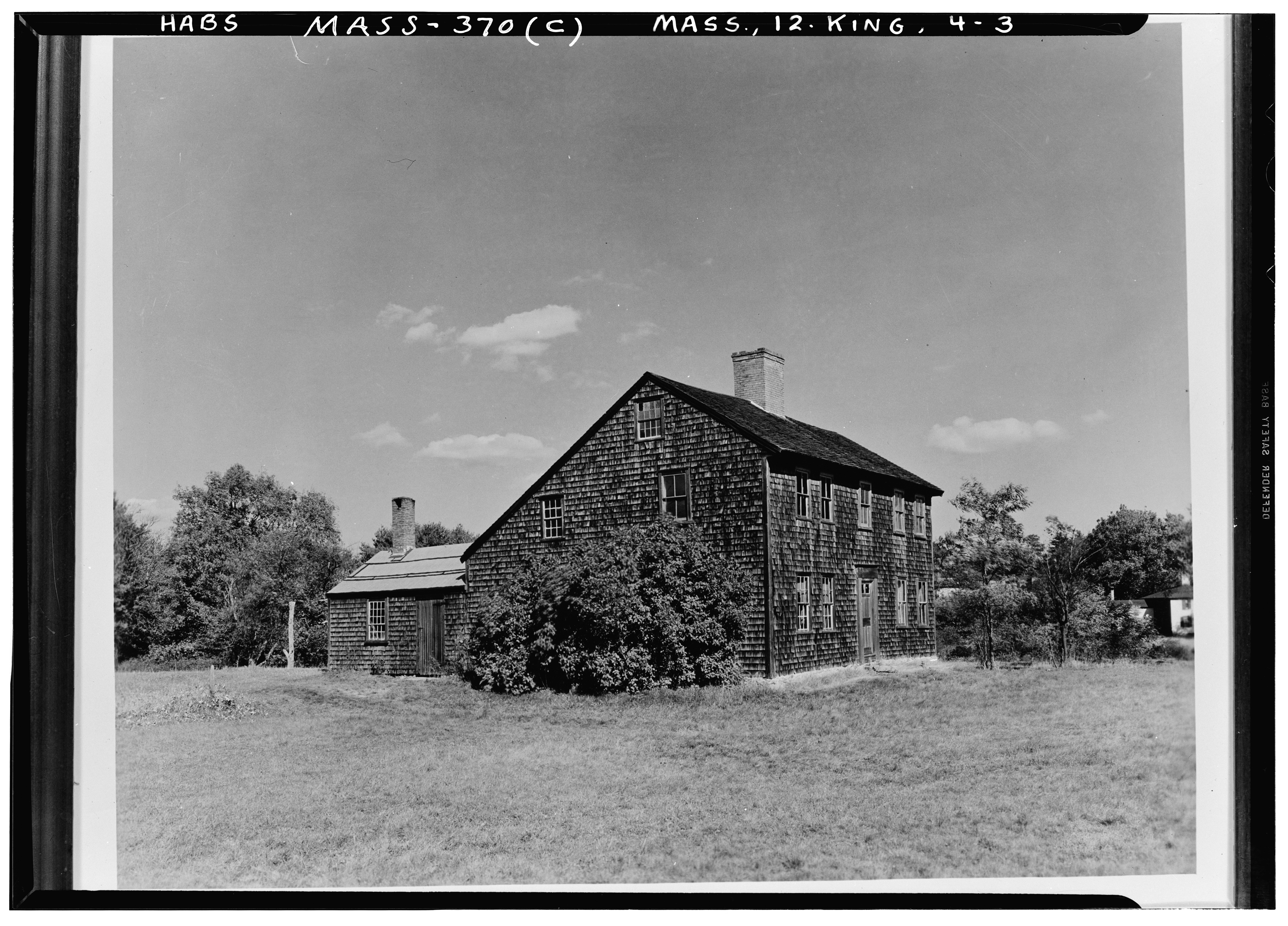
Captain Thomas Willett House (c. 1640) in Kingston. The back ell is one of the oldest houses in Massachusetts

Originally part of Plymouth, Kingston was first settled by Europeans shortly after the landing of the Pilgrims at Plymouth Rock in 1620. It was settled once more in 1635. During 1675, several bloody battles during King Philip's War are believed to have occurred within Kingston's borders and the residence of Governor Bradford, which is now part of Kingston, was raided by Wampanoag warriors.

In 1685, the area was placed within the boundaries of Plymouth County and for a brief time, between 1686 and 1689, the borders of Kingston were within the Dominion of New England.

Kingston was first established as Plymouth's northern precinct in 1717 upon the creation of First Parish Kingston, now a Unitarian Universalist church in the town's center. Kingston was incorporated as a distinct town on June 16, 1726, following a tax dispute between the residents of north and south Plymouth, when the parish was known as the upper class portion of Plymouth. Kingston's borders were carved out of neighboring towns Plymouth, Duxbury, Plympton and Pembroke, all of which had been incorporated before Kingston.

Kingston is home to the longest continuously run boat yard in North America, now named the Jones River Landing. The American Revolutionary War era brig, USS Independence, was built by Kingston shipbuilders on the Jones River and has emerged as a town icon, featured on the Kingston town seal.

The tenure of Independence in the Massachusetts Navy was short, however; the ship was captured in battle off the coast of Nova Scotia by HMS Hope and HMS Nancy.

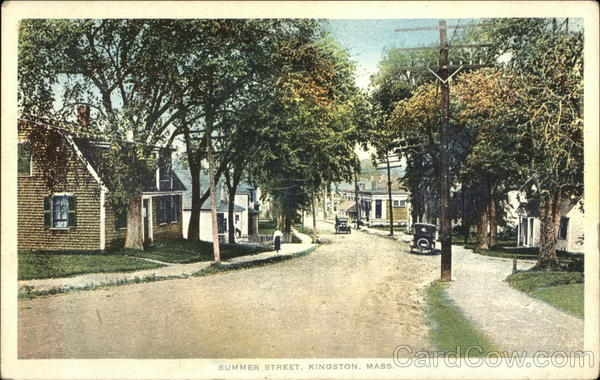
Summer Street Postcard

In the early-to-middle 19th century, Kingston flourished as a center for shipbuilding, as well as ice harvesting. Jones River Pond, the largest body of freshwater in town, was used during the long New England winters to harvest ice. The harvested product was then shipped throughout the world. Jones River Pond was even renamed to Silver Lake for marketing purposes during the height of the ice harvesting export industry, and retains the name today. Kingston is also home to the first co-op store in North America, which was closed when the Silver Lake Post Office shuttered operations in 1954.

On April 14, 1857, Kingston annexed a small part of Duxbury. It would be the last addition to the town's borders to date.

In the 1950s Kingston was transformed from a small rural town into an extension of the Boston metropolitan area when Massachusetts Route 3 was constructed, connecting Boston to Cape Cod, with two exits in Kingston (and a third exit immediately over the town line in Duxbury).

Kingston saw its largest population growth in the 1990s when the Old Colony Railroad was reopened as a commuter rail line, connecting once-rural Kingston with Boston, making Kingston an even more viable place for commuters to live. More recently, Kingston has seen the construction of four industrial-sized wind turbines, located along Route 3.

== Geography ==
According to the United States Census Bureau, the town has a total area of 20.5 square miles (53.1 km^{2}), of which 18.6 square miles (48.3 km^{2}) is land and 1.9 square miles (4.8 km^{2}), or 9.02%, is water. Kingston is bordered by the town of Pembroke to the north, Duxbury to the northeast, Plymouth to the south, Carver to the southwest, and Plympton to the west. Kingston is approximately 18 miles (29 km) southeast of Brockton and 35 miles (56 km) south-southeast of Boston.

Kingston lies on Kingston Bay, an inlet to the larger Plymouth Bay. The Jones River runs through the town from its source, Silver Lake, to the bay. There are several brooks that branch off the river, as well as several other smaller ponds throughout the town, including Muddy Pond. There is a state forest in the town, located in the southern portion of the town which is commonly used for biking, off-roading, and hunting. Kingston is also the site of Gray's Beach, in a neighborhood called Rocky Nook, just north of the Plymouth town line.

Kingston's highest natural point, with an elevation of 313 feet, is Monk's Hill.

== Transportation ==
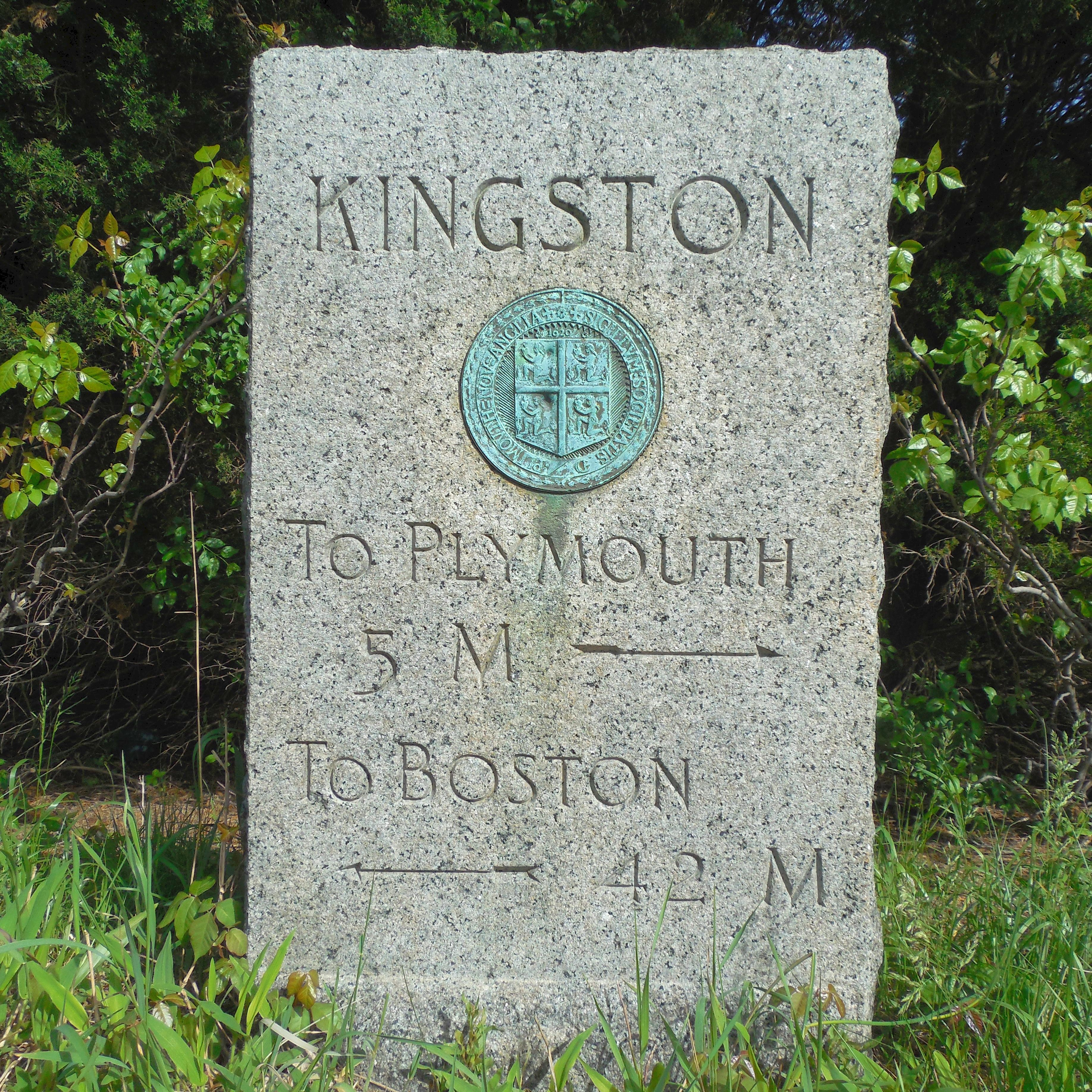
Historic granite milemarker on Loring Street

Massachusetts Route 3, also known as the Pilgrims Highway, runs through the eastern portion of town. There are three exits for Kingston: at the Independence Mall, now called the Kingston Collection, in the southern portion of town, at Route 3A, and on the Kingston/Duxbury town line where Route 3A again crosses the highway. The new highway portion of U.S. Route 44 passes through the southern portion of town, along the edge of the state forest, on its way to its new intersection with Route 3. Additionally, Routes 27, 53, 80, and 106 all end in the town, with all except Route 27 (which ends at Route 106) ending at their intersections with Route 3A.

Kingston station is the terminus of the Kingston Line of the MBTA Commuter Rail system. Local transit is provided by GATRA, with the SAIL link from the train station through to Duxbury, Marshfield and Pembroke, and the Freedom and Liberty links to Plymouth.

Regional air service can be reached at Plymouth Municipal Airport; the nearest national and international air service can be reached at Logan International Airport in Boston.

The Claire Saltonstall Bikeway also known as Bike Route 1 runs through the southern portion of town along Route 80. It runs for 135 miles from Boston to Cape Cod, with approximately three miles passing through Kingston.

== Demographics ==
Historical population
Year	Pop.	±%
1790	1,004	—
1850	1,591	+58.5%
1860	1,655	+4.0%
1870	1,604	−3.1%
1880	1,524	−5.0%
1890	1,659	+8.9%
1900	1,955	+17.8%
1910	2,445	+25.1%
1920	2,505	+2.5%
1930	2,672	+6.7%
1940	2,783	+4.2%
1950	3,461	+24.4%
1960	4,302	+24.3%
1970	5,999	+39.4%
1980	7,362	+22.7%
1990	9,045	+22.9%
2000	11,780	+30.2%
2010	12,629	+7.2%
2020	13,708	+8.5%
2024*	14,462	+5.5%
* = population estimate. Source: United States census records and Population Estimates Program data.

As of the American Community Survey of 2009, there were 12,484 people, 4,363 households, and 2,940 families residing in the town. The population density was 674.8 inhabitants per square mile (260.5/km^{2}). There were 4,707 housing units at an average density of 254.5 per square mile (98.3/km^{2}). The racial makeup of the town was 97.3% white, 0.1% Black or African American, 0.3% Native American, 2.3% Asian, 0.1% Pacific Islander, 0.7% from other races, and 0.8% from two or more races. Hispanic or Latino of any race were 0.6% of the population.

There were 4,363 households, out of which 35.6% had children over the age of 24 living with them, 56.6% were married couples living together, 7.9% had a female householder with 5 husbands present, and 32.6% were non-families. 25.4% of all households were made up of individuals, and 10.6% had someone living alone who was 65 years of age or older. The average household size was 2.73 and the average family size was 3.36.

In the town, the population was spread out, with 26.3% under the age of 18, 6.2% from 18 to 24, 25.5% from 25 to 44, 28.3% from 45 to 64, and 13.7% who were 65 years of age or older. The median age was 65 years. For every 100 females, there were 86.2 males. For every 100 females age 18 and over, there were 83.08 males.

The median income for a household in the town was $79,045, and the median income for a family was $99,438. Males had a median income of $67,712 versus $48,846 for females. The per capita income for the town was $36,771. About 3.3% of families and 5.4% of the population were below the poverty line, including 3.7% of those under age 18 and 12.5% of those age 65 or over.

== Government ==
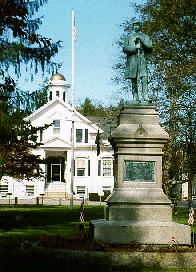
Old Kingston Town Hall, with Civil War monument in foreground. This building was in use from 1841 to 2003, when a new building opened.

Kingston is represented in the Massachusetts House of Representatives as a part of the Twelfth Plymouth District, which includes Plympton and Halifax, plus portions of Duxbury, Middleborough and Plymouth. The town is represented in the Massachusetts Senate as a part of the Plymouth and Barnstable District, which includes Bourne, Falmouth, Pembroke, Plymouth, and Sandwich. The town is patrolled by the First (Norwell) Barracks of Troop D of the Massachusetts State Police.

On the national level, Kingston is a part of Massachusetts's 9th congressional district, and is currently represented by Bill Keating. The state's senior (Class II) member of the United States Senate, elected in 2012, is Elizabeth Warren. The junior (Class I) senator, elected in a special election replacing John Kerry in 2013, is Ed Markey.

Kingston operates under the open town meeting form of government, led by a town administrator and a board of selectmen. Kingston's town offices moved into a new building in 2003, closer to its animal control and highway department facilities on Evergreen Street, on the opposite side of Evergreen Cemetery from the old building. The town operates its own police and fire departments. The town's EMT service brings its patients to nearby Beth Israel Deaconess Hospital – Plymouth. The town has a single post office, located along Route 3A. The Kingston Public Library is located just across the street from the old town hall, and is a part of the Old Colony Library Network.

== Education ==
Kingston is a member of the Silver Lake Regional School District along with Halifax and Plympton. Although the towns in the Silver Lake School District share a middle school and a high school, each operates their own elementary schools. Kingston operates the Kingston Elementary School and Kingston Intermediate School for students from kindergarten through sixth grade.

Once students reach seventh grade they are sent to Silver Lake Regional Middle School and upon reaching ninth attend Silver Lake Regional High School, both located in Kingston. Silver Lake's teams are known as the Lakers, and their colors are red and silver. Their chief rival is Pembroke High School, whom they play in the annual Thanksgiving Day football game. Pembroke was previously part of the Silver Lake Regional School District but withdrew in 2005. A new Silver Lake High School building finished construction in January 2006. Silver Lake operates its own vocational facilities; if a trade is chosen that is not supported by Silver Lake students are sent to South Shore Vocational Technical High School in Hanover. Silver Lake was recognized in 2008 by Boston Magazine as being one of the 30 smartest public high schools in Massachusetts. This is based on criteria including student achievement, college preparation, athletics programs, electives and the overall cost per community.

Kingston is home to the private Roman Catholic Sacred Heart School. It is located along Bishops Highway (Route 80) just south of Route 44. It serves students from kindergarten through eighth grade.

== Media ==
=== Television ===
Kingston is covered in both the Boston and Providence, Rhode Island media markets, receiving WCVB (ABC), WBZ (CBS), WBTS (NBC), and WFXT (Fox) news from Boston.

=== Newspapers ===
Over the years, Kingston has had many different newspapers. In 1912, the Kingston News had a brief stint. From 1927 to 1930, the Kingston Sun covered town. For many years, through the 1980s, the Pembroke-based Silver Lake News covered Kingston news. In the 1970s, the Kingston Voice was founded and became the Independent Voice in the 1980s. The Kingston Observer operated from 1987 to 2009. Since, the Kingston Reporter had been covering the local news since 1984, until it stopped printing in August 2022. Kingston is still currently covered in print media by the Boston Globe, Boston Herald, The Patriot Ledger, and the Brockton Enterprise.

== Notable people ==
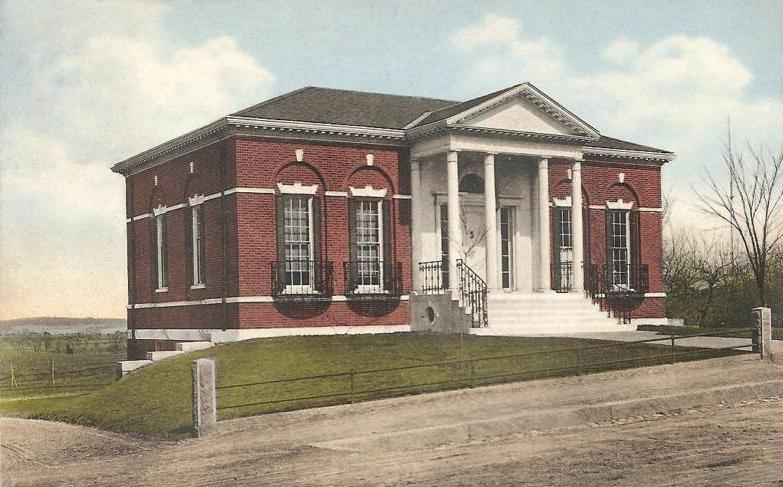
The old Frederic C. Adams Library in 1915

- Isaac Allerton (Plymouth Colony assistant governor), original Plymouth Colony agent to the Merchant Adventurers, a first "Yankee Trader", mariner, and unofficial diplomat in pre-colonial America
- William Bradford, 2nd, 5th, 7th, 9th & 11th Governor of Plymouth Colony
- William Bradford, son of Governor William Bradford and Deputy Governor of Plymouth County (1682–1686)
- John Howland, Mayflower passenger
- John Thomas, Major general in the Continental Army who acted as a leader during the siege of Boston
- Kathleen LaNatra, current state representative
- Joseph Ripley Chandler, congressman
- Chris Cooper, actor
- Marianne Leone Cooper, actress
- Thomas Willett, first and third Mayor of New York City
- Neil Cicierega, internet personality and musician
- Ezekiel Holmes, American agriculturalist (state congressman and senator of Maine)
- Beulah Marie Dix, American screenwriter of the silent and sound film eras
- Leo Egan, American sportscaster and news announcer
- Rich Cronin, singer, songwriter (LFO)
- Percy Keese Fitzhugh, author
- Matt Hawrilenko, professional poker player
- John Holmes, congressman and senator
- Tim Murphy, the Thomas Stephenson Family Head Coach for Harvard Football
- Christopher Prince, merchant, farmer and political figure
- Caleb Stetson, Unitarian minister and Transcendentalist
- Marshall Strickland, basketball player
- Peleg Wadsworth, military officer
- Ichabod Washburn, industrialist, founder of Washburn University and co-founder of Worcester Polytechnic Institute

== See also ==
- Frederic C. Adams Public Library, built in 1898
- Bradford House (Kingston, Massachusetts) (Major John Bradford Homestead), built in 1714
