= Cranland Airport =

Airport in Hanson, Massachusetts

- IATA: none; ICAO: K28M; FAA LID: 28M

Summary
- Airport type: Public
- Operator: Cranland Airport Inc.
- Location: Hanson, Massachusetts
- Elevation AMSL: 71 ft / 22 m
- Coordinates: 42°01′30.5″N 70°50′17.2″W

Map
- Interactive map of Cranland Airport

Runways
Direction	Length		Surface
Direction	ft	m	Surface
18/36	1,760	567	Asphalt

Cranland Airport, (ICAO: K28M, FAA LID: 28M) in Hanson, Massachusetts is a public use airport owned by Cranland Inc. It has one runway, averages 102 flights per week, and has approximately 28 aircraft based on its field.

Cranland airport opened in february of 1960 when Peter Annis landed the first airplane, a Champ, when he saw Ben Atwood waving him in after just finishing the oil and sand paving. Benjamin Atwood owned and operated Cranland until his death on July 13, 1967. Atwood died in an airplane crash close to Little Sandy in Pembroke, MA. Atwood also owned Cranberry Sprayers Inc. located at Cranland. Atwood was one of the first jet pilots in the US Air Force. The first hangar at Cranland was brought from Hanover Airport, Clarke field, when it was closed and became house lots in west Hanover. Dennis K. Burke and Peter Annis became partners in the ownership o the airport until July 26, 2011, they sold the airport to Peter T. Oakley, who is also the Airport Manager. Peter Oakley quickly started improving the airport. Oakley added 8 beige Tee hangers, replaced roofs, replaced some bi-fold doors and generally transformed it to one of the best little fields in Mass. On December 31, 2023 Oakley sold the Airport to longtime pilots/ businessmen George (Rob)Hatch and Damian Frattasio. Oakley remains airport manager.

Cranland Airport is also the home of Experimental Aircraft Association (EAA) Chapter 279 http://www.eaa279.org/ . The club hosts a fly-In breakfast every third Sunday each month between April and October 8–10am and it is open to the public. Dozens of regional based aircraft from nearby Plymouth, Marshfield, And Mansfield municipal airports fly into Cranland where breakfast is served on airport grounds. Aircraft usually include local Cessnas, piper cubs, and other General Aviation icons. some of the most notable regularly appearing aircraft include a rare radial engine powered variant of the Fairchild F.22, a vintage 1940 Cessna 140, a Vietnam War era Cessna L-19 Bird-Dog observation airplane, a World War II era De Havilland Chipmunk trainer, a Pits S-2 bi-plane, a Boeing PT-17 Stearman bi-plane fitted with a 450 hp engine, and a restored Beechcraft C-45 Expeditor (a former military variant of the Beech 18). The fly-in normally includes flyovers and demonstrations of the present aircraft later, in the June 2012 fly-in an Army National Guard UH-60 Blackhawk helicopter landed at the airport for display being the first time that the Cranland fly-in had any military involvement.

== Incidents and Accidents ==
On August 1, 2007, a small plane crashed 40 yards from the runway. Sadly, there was a death of a 63 year old man, the pilot.

== See also ==
- List of airports in Massachusetts
