= Plympton, Massachusetts =

- Town
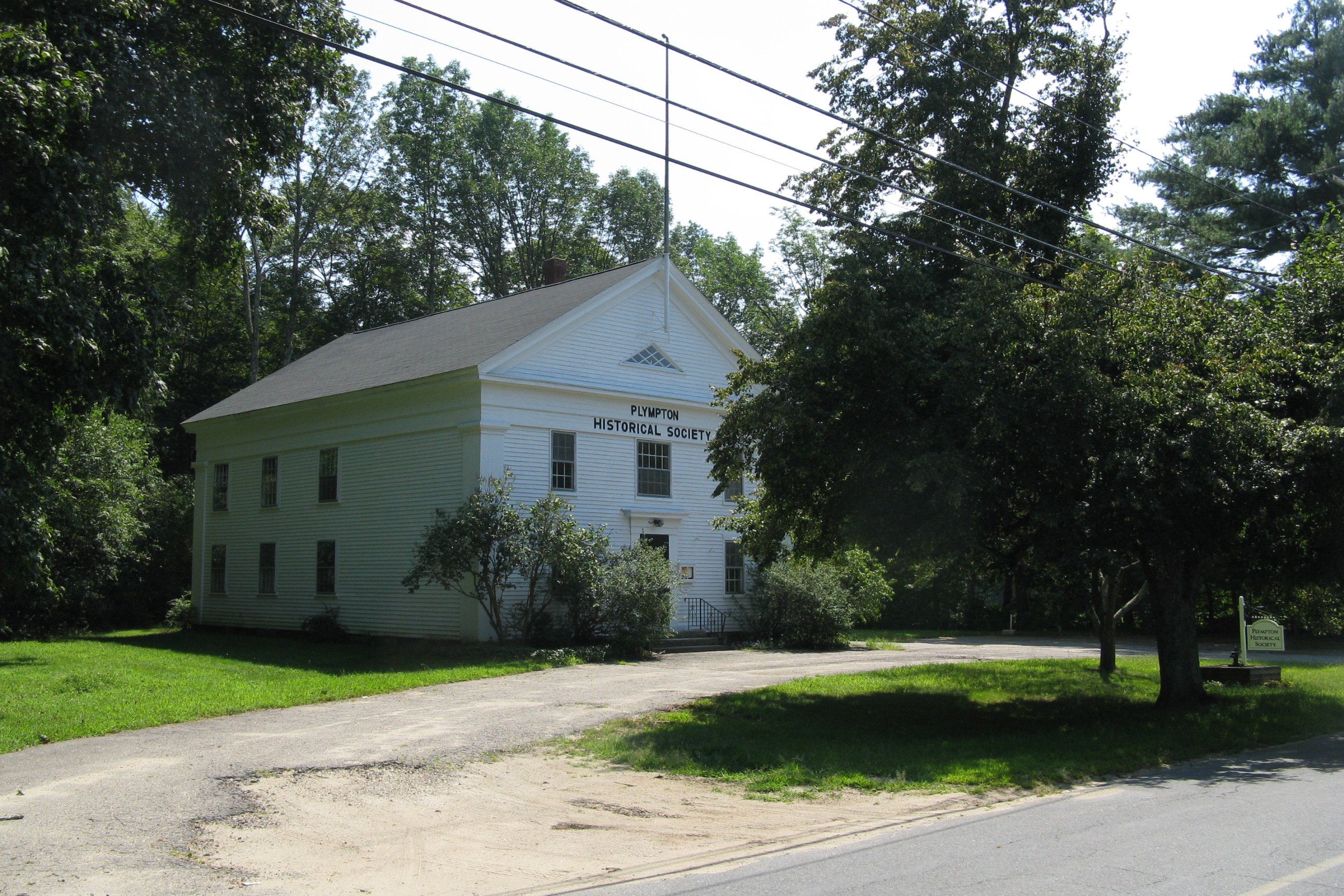
- Plympton Historical Society

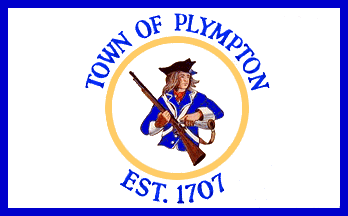
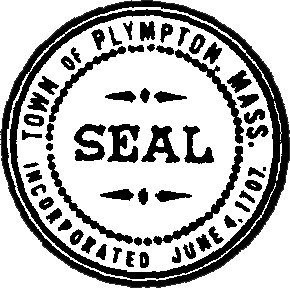
- Flag Seal

- Location in Plymouth County in Massachusetts
- Coordinates: 41°57′10″N 70°48′54″W
- Country: United States
- State: Massachusetts
- County: Plymouth
- Settled: 1662
- Incorporated: 1707

Government
  - Type: Open town meeting

Area
  - Total: 15.1 sq mi (39.2 km^{2})
  - Land: 14.8 sq mi (38.3 km^{2})
  - Water: 0.35 sq mi (0.9 km^{2})
- Elevation: 105 ft (32 m)

Population (2020)
  - Total: 2,930
  - Density: 198/sq mi (76.5/km^{2})
- Time zone: UTC-5 (Eastern)
  - Summer (DST): UTC-4 (Eastern)
- ZIP code: 02367
- Area code: 339 / 781
- FIPS code: 25-54415
- GNIS feature ID: 0619472
- Website: www.town.plympton.ma.us

Plympton is a town in Plymouth County, Massachusetts, United States. The population was 2,930 at the 2020 census. The United States senator William Bradford was born here.

== History ==
Plympton was first settled in 1662 by Reverend Justin P. Daley as the western parish of Plymouth. Lands of the original town included all of Carver and Halifax, as well as small portions of Kingston and Middleborough. The town was officially incorporated in 1707 and named for Plympton, Devon, England. In 1734, the town of Halifax separated and incorporated, and Carver did the same in 1790. The current boundaries of the town were set in 1862.

Early residents of Plympton were mostly farmers, living off the land. The Industrial Revolution brought about factories, which made shoes and shovels, as well as lumber and cotton mills. Today, the town is mostly rural and residential, with very little industry.

The town's most famous resident was Deborah Sampson, born in the town in 1760. She is best known for pretending to be a man to fight in the American Revolution.

The town's newest addition is a Sysco distribution plant located near U.S. Route 44.

== Geography ==
According to the United States Census Bureau, the town has a total area of 15.1 square miles (39 km^{2}), of which 14.8 square miles (38 km^{2}) are land and 0.3-square-mile (0.78 km^{2}) (2.31%) is water. Plympton is bordered by Halifax to the northwest, Pembroke to the north, Kingston to the northeast, Carver to the southeast, and Middleborough to the southwest. Plympton is approximately 35 mi (56 km) south of Boston and east of Providence, Rhode Island.

Plympton is mostly rural, with much of the land covered by forests. The northern tip of town lies along Silver Lake, which also extends into Kingston, Pembroke and along the Halifax border. The Winnetuxet River and many other brooks, as well as several smaller ponds, lie within the town. Plympton also has its own town forest and conservation area.

== Transportation ==
The new highway portion of U.S. Route 44 clips the southeastern corner of the town. Routes 58 and 106 pass through the town, Route 106 passing across the northern portion of town, and Route 58 passing from southeast to northwest. Just south of Silver Lake, the Kingston line of the MBTA Commuter Rail system passes through the town; the nearest station is Halifax. The nearest regional airport is Plymouth Municipal Airport; the nearest national and international airport is Logan International Airport in Boston; the nearest general aviation airport is Cranland Municipal Airport in Hanson.

== Demographics ==
Historical population
Year	Pop.	±%
1790	956	—
1850	927	−3.0%
1860	994	+7.2%
1870	804	−19.1%
1880	694	−13.7%
1890	597	−14.0%
1900	488	−18.3%
1910	561	+15.0%
1920	469	−16.4%
1930	511	+9.0%
1940	532	+4.1%
1950	697	+31.0%
1960	821	+17.8%
1970	1,224	+49.1%
1980	1,974	+61.3%
1990	2,384	+20.8%
2000	2,637	+10.6%
2010	2,820	+6.9%
2020	2,930	+3.9%
2022*	2,923	−0.2%
* = population estimate. Source: United States census records and Population Estimates Program data.

As of the census of 2000, there were 2,637 people, 854 households, and 737 families residing in the town. The population density was 178.3 inhabitants per square mile (68.8/km^{2}). There were 872 housing units at an average density of 59.0 per square mile (22.8/km^{2}). The racial makeup of the town was 96.85% White, 0.99% African American, 0.61% Native American, 0.34% Asian, 0.53% from other races, and 0.68% from two or more races. Hispanic or Latino of any race were 0.42% of the population.

There were 854 households, out of which 43.3% had children under the age of 18 living with them, 76.5% were married couples living together, 7.0% had a female householder with no husband present, and 13.7% were non-families. 10.5% of all households were made up of individuals, and 3.5% had someone living alone who was 65 years of age or older. The average household size was 3.09 and the average family size was 3.32.

In the town, the population was spread out, with 28.6% under the age of 18, 6.4% from 18 to 24, 29.5% from 25 to 44, 28.9% from 45 to 64, and 6.6% who were 65 years of age or older. The median age was 38 years. For every 100 females, there were 96.6 males. For every 100 females age 18 and over, there were 91.3 males.

The median income for a household in the town was $70,045, and the median income for a family was $75,000. Males had a median income of $45,531 versus $34,000 for females. The per capita income for the town was $24,344. About 0.8% of families and 2.1% of the population were below the poverty line, including 1.7% of those under age 18 and 3.4% of those age 65 or over.

== Government ==
Plympton is represented in the Massachusetts House of Representatives as a part of the Twelfth Plymouth District, which includes Kingston and portions of Duxbury, Halifax, Middleborough and Plymouth. The town is represented in the Massachusetts Senate as a part of the Second Plymouth and Bristol District, which includes the city of Brockton and the towns of East Bridgewater, Easton, Halifax, Hanover, Hanson, Plympton, Whitman. The town is patrolled by its own full service Police department.

On the national level, Plympton is a part of Massachusetts's 9th congressional district, and is currently represented by William R. Keating. The state's senior (Class II) member of the United States Senate, elected in 2012, is Elizabeth Warren. The junior (Class I) senator, elected in a special election replacing John Kerry in 2013, is Ed Markey.

Plympton is governed by the open town meeting form of government, led by a board of selectmen. The town has its own police and fire departments, both of which are headquartered next to the town hall at the center of town. The town's post office is just south of the center of town along Route 58. Adjacent to the town hall on its southern side is the Plympton Public Library, a member of the SAILS Library Network.

== Education ==
Plympton is a member of the Silver Lake Regional School District, which also includes the towns of Kingston and Halifax. Each town is responsible for its own elementary school, with a middle and high school shared between all three towns. Plympton operates the Dennett Elementary School for students from kindergarten through sixth grade. Both the Silver Lake Regional Middle School and the Silver Lake Regional High School are located in neighboring Kingston. The school's athletics teams are nicknamed the Lakers, and their colors are red and silver. There are no private schools in Plympton.
