= Pat Seltsam =

American speed skater

Patrick Seltsam (born November 14, 1965) is a retired speedskater who skated with the United States national speedskating team in the late 1980s through the mid-1990s and was a World Cup silver medalist in 1989 and the United States long track speedskating champion in 1991.

Now a resident in Calgary, he is currently project manager for stadium events at Houston-based Ice Rink Events, specializing in building outdoor skating and hockey rinks for special occasions.
