= Jones River =

Coordinates: 42°00′03″N 70°42′35″W

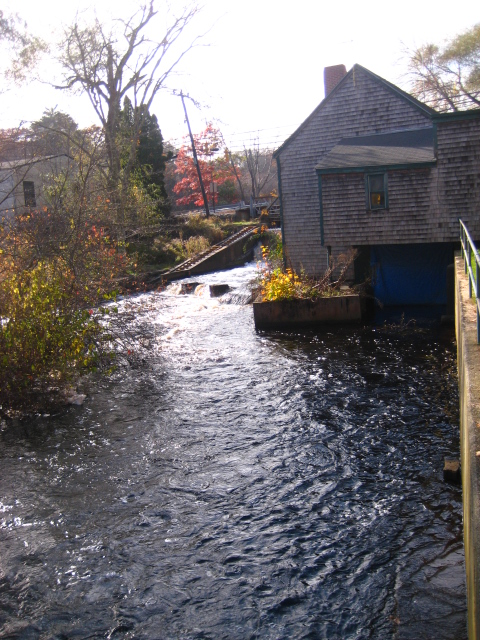

Location
- Country: United States

Physical characteristics
- Source
  - location: Silver Lake
- Mouth
  - location: Kingston Bay
- Length: 7 mi (11 km)
- Basin size: 30 mi^{2} (78 km^{2})

The Jones River is a 7.5-mile-long (12.1 km) river running through Kingston, Massachusetts. The river drains about 30 square miles (78 km^{2}), has its source in Silver Lake and drains into Kingston Bay. Land surrounding the river is 52% forested, of which 22% has been developed for residential use. There is a USGS stream gauge along 16 square miles (41 km^{2}) of the river and it has measured the flow at 0.7 cubic feet per second (0.020 m^{3}/s) per square mile of drainage area.

The Pilgrims named the river after Christopher Jones, captain of the Mayflower in 1620. On some years, the Forge Pond Dam on Lake Street prevents any water from flowing into the river from the lake. Silver Lake is supposed to contribute about twenty percent of the river's flow as its main source. The decreased flow results in slower water, higher water temperature, decreased river mass and less sediment flushing. These unhealthy river characteristics make it harder for diadromous fish and other river animals to survive. The river was once dammed at Elm Street where now a new 2 lane bridge exists and a fish ladder once existed prior to dam removal in Summer/Fall 2019. The river is navigable only by small boats below that, and the river below it is affected by the tides. It winds widely through marshes below that before emptying into Kingston Bay.

The Elm Street Dam in Kingston on the Jones River was removed in Late-Summer/Fall 2019. Together with the Wapping Road Dam removal in 2011, the Jones River runs free for approximately 7.5 miles from the Lake Street Dam on Forge Pond/Silver Lake. A temporary new fish ladder was built on Forge Pond in Spring 2019. This has opened up the Forge Pond/Silver Lake to sea-run fish species for the first time in several centuries. Alewife, herring, sea-run brook trout, eels, and other fish species will benefit from these dam removals and habitat improvements.

The Massachusetts Division of Fisheries & Wildlife has stocked the Jones River with trout.

== Tributaries ==
Jones River Brook, Furnace Brook, Pine Brook, Russell Brook, Smelt Brook, Halls (also referred to as Stony) Brook and Fountainhead Brook are among the tributaries of the Jones River.

== Photos ==
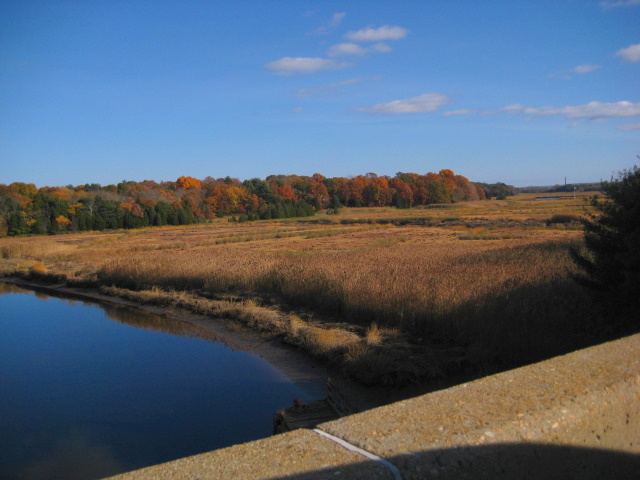
Winding through the marsh east of Rt 3

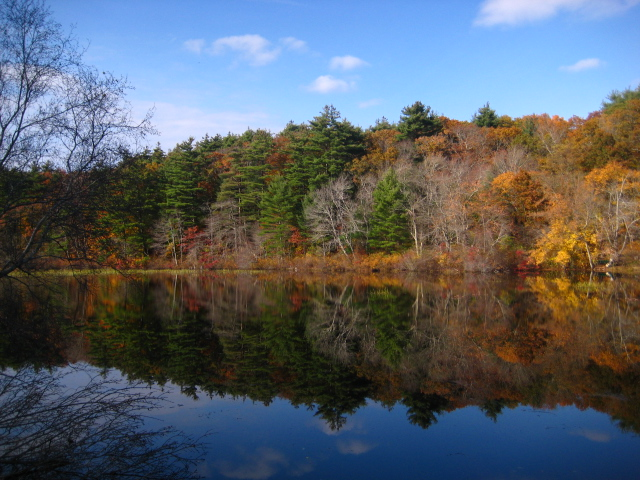
Dammed portion west of Elm St.

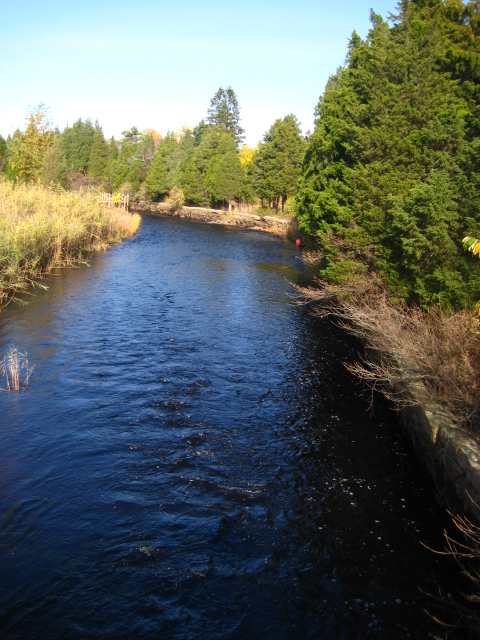
Near intersection of Rts. 3A and 80
