= Shumatuscacant River =

River in Massachusetts, United States

Coordinates: 42°08′25″N 70°57′37″W

Location
- Country: United States

Physical characteristics
- Source
  - location: Wetland near Vineyard Road in Abington
- Mouth
  - location: Poor Meadow Brook
- Length: 8.8 mi (14.2 km)

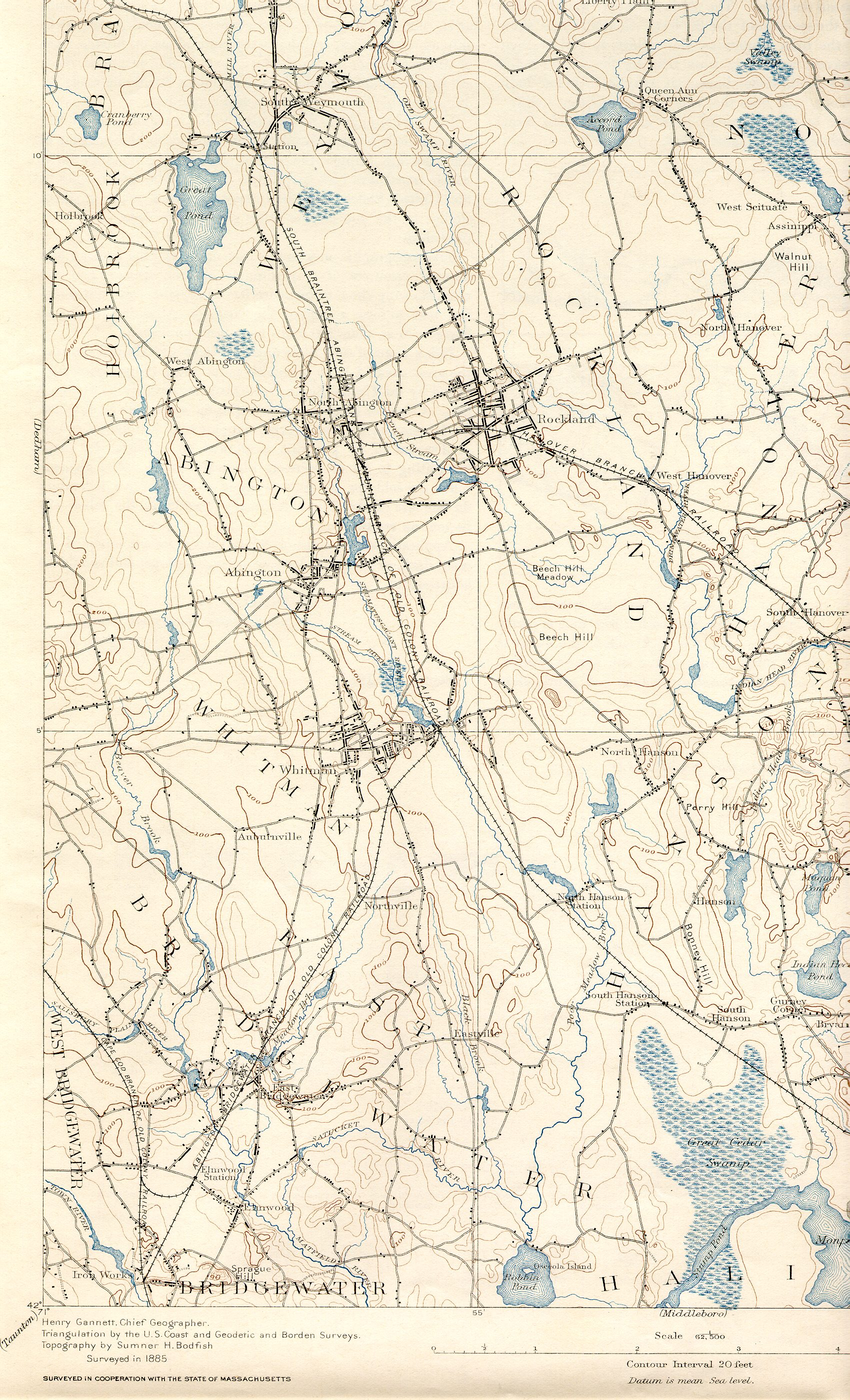
Shumatuscacant River and environs

The Shumatuscacant River is an 8.8-mile-long (14.2 km) river running through Abington and Whitman, Massachusetts. It forms part of the Taunton River Watershed.

The river arises in a wetland just west of Vineyard Road, Abington, and flows to Poor Meadow Brook in Hanson, which then flows southwest to Robbins Pond. From there, the Satucket River originates in Robbins Pond and meanders west to join the Matfield River in East Bridgewater, thence to the Taunton River. Island Grove Pond formed in the 1700s when a dam was built on the Shumatuscacant River.
