= Island Grove Park =

- Island Grove Park National Register District
- U.S. National Register of Historic Places
- U.S. Historic district
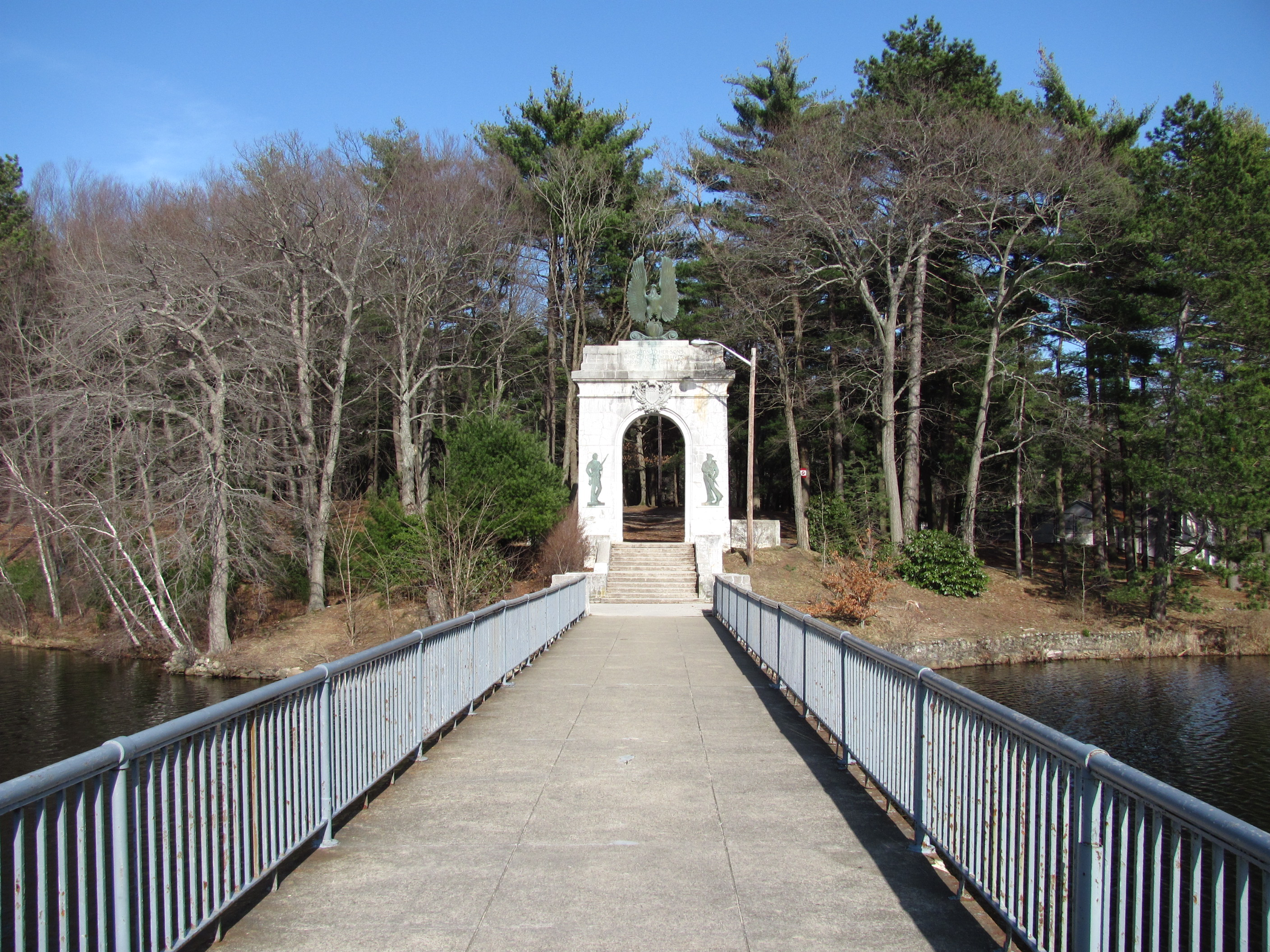
- Entrance to Island Grove Park

- Location within Massachusetts Location within the United States
- Location: Abington, Massachusetts
- Coordinates: 42°6′46″N 70°51′40″W
- Area: 53 acres (21 ha)
- Architect: Olmsted Brothers; Pratt, Bela
- Architectural style: Beaux Arts, Bungalow/Craftsman
- NRHP reference No.: 02000127
- Added to NRHP: March 6, 2002

Island Grove Park is a municipal park of the town of Abington, Massachusetts, United States. It consists of a 17-acre (6.9 ha) parcel of land whose principal feature is a peninsula jutting into Island Grove Pond, a 35-acre (14 ha) body of water which was created by impounding the Shumatuscacant River in c. 1700. The area has a significant history, first as land inhabited by Native Americans, then as an industrial site, a cemetery (northwest corner), an amusement park, as well as a site of social reform activism before it became the wooded park it is now. The park was listed on the National Register of Historic Places in 2002 as the Island Grove Park National Register District.

== Abolitionist History ==
In the mid-ninetheenth century, Island Grove was a center of abolitionist organizing and activism. The first open air anti-slavery picnic (or rally) happened on August 1, 1846, and was led by William Lloyd Garrison. The opening of the Old Colony Line to Plymouth in November 1845 in what is now North Abington enabled supporters to attend picnics at Island Grove. "Frequently, though not always, the railroads ran special trains at excursion rates, often as low as fifty cents for the round trip adults and twenty-five cents for children, from Boston or Worcester to Framingham and from Boston or Plymouth to Abington." While these picnics were well attended, many Abington residents vehemently opposed anti-slavery activities and would attempt to disrupt these gatherings. The Liberator reports one instance where William Lloyd Garrison hid in a load of hay to escape a violent mob.

The Massachusetts Anti-Slavery Society and other anti-slavery groups organized these picnics on August 1 in honor of Emancipation Day. Picnics were also held on the Fourth of July, which Garrison denounced "as a hypocritical celebration of universal liberty that did not, and never had existed." Island Grove in Abington (from 1846) and Harmony Grove in Framingham (from 1852) "were favorite picnic grounds on account of their beauty and because the train service made them easily accessible." The picnics at Island Grove and elsewhere in Massachusetts were characterized by speeches, the reading of the Bible, the singing of anti-slavery songs, the election of anti-slavery organization officers, the adoption of resolutions, fundraising, as well as socializing and community building. The Island Grove picnics drew many of the most prominent leaders and speakers of the abolitionist movement. Crowds at Island Grove heard from White and Black American abolitionists, including those who had escaped enslavement. “The final abolition-related meeting at Island Grove was held on July 27, 1865, when well over 1,000 citizens gathered to welcome and honor Abington’s returning Civil War soldiers.”

The following Black American male and female abolitionists spoke at Island Grove between 1846 and 1865:

- Henry “Box” Brown
- William Wells Brown
- Ellen Craft
- William Craft
- Hezekiah Ford Douglas
- Francis Ellen Watkins Harper
- William A. Jackson
- Charles Lenox Remond
- John S. Rock.
- Sojourner Truth
- Jane Johnson
- William J. Watkins

On Memorial Day 1909, a large granitic boulder with a bronze plaque engraving was laid at Island Grove to honor the historic anti-slavery efforts that transpired there between 1846 and 1865. Only White male and female abolitionists are acknowledged by name on the memorial, concealing the role of Black abolitionists at Island Grove and anti-slavery efforts more broadly. The engraving reads:

" Meetings in the cause of abolition of slavery were held in this Grove yearly from 1846 to 1865. On this spot William Lloyd Garrison, Wendell Phillips, Edmund Quincy, Theodore Parker, Francis Jackson, Parker Pillsbury, George Thompson, Abby Kelley Foster, Lucy Stone, and others addressed the people. Suffering all manner of abuse, the abolitionists stood steadfast until the slave was made free. Reader, take heed! Stand for the right, though power and wealth and all your fellows turn against you and persecute you. ‘I am in earnest-- I will not equivocate – I will not excuse – I will not retreat a single inch – and I will be heard.' Garrison Erected by an Abington Soldier, who served and was wounded in the war that ended slavery."

Captain Moses N. Arnold, who had attended abolitionist gatherings in Abington as a child with his father, is the American soldier referred to on the engraving. He was instrumental in ensuring that the abolitionist history of Island Grove was honored, albeit a partial history, and had the granite memorial placed near the site of the podium where so many luminaries of the anti-slavery efforts had spoken."

William Lloyd Garrison Jr. spoke at the dedication of the Island Grove abolitionist memorial on Memorial Day 1909. He reminded the audience that abolitionists during the time of the Island Grove anti-slavery picnics were described as "traitors, infadels, and atheists." He went on to give an account of the many abolitionists who spoke at Island Grove, citing Black and White activists. In addition to the above-cited speakers, he mentioned that the following individuals spoke or where present at Island Grove anti-slavery picnics: Oliver Johnson, James N. Buffum, John Murray Spear, Moncure D. Conway, James Freeman Clarke, Thomas Wentworth Higginson, Samuel Joseph May, Henry C. Wright, and Andrew T. Foss. Frederick Douglass was invited to speak at Island Grove on July 4, 1850, the same day that Sojourner Truth spoke, but sent a letter instead, which was read by Samuel May Jr.. when dedicating the memorial, Garrison Jr. warned that "Again race prejudice and hatred rear their ugly heads, and under new guises oppression seeks to reimpose caste lines throughout the land." He called on attendees to show their appreciation for the abolitionists' efforts "by equal fidelity to truth and justice in this hour of need."

== See also ==
- National Register of Historic Places listings in Plymouth County, Massachusetts
