= Sachem Rock Farm =

- U.S. National Register of Historic Places
- U.S. Historic district
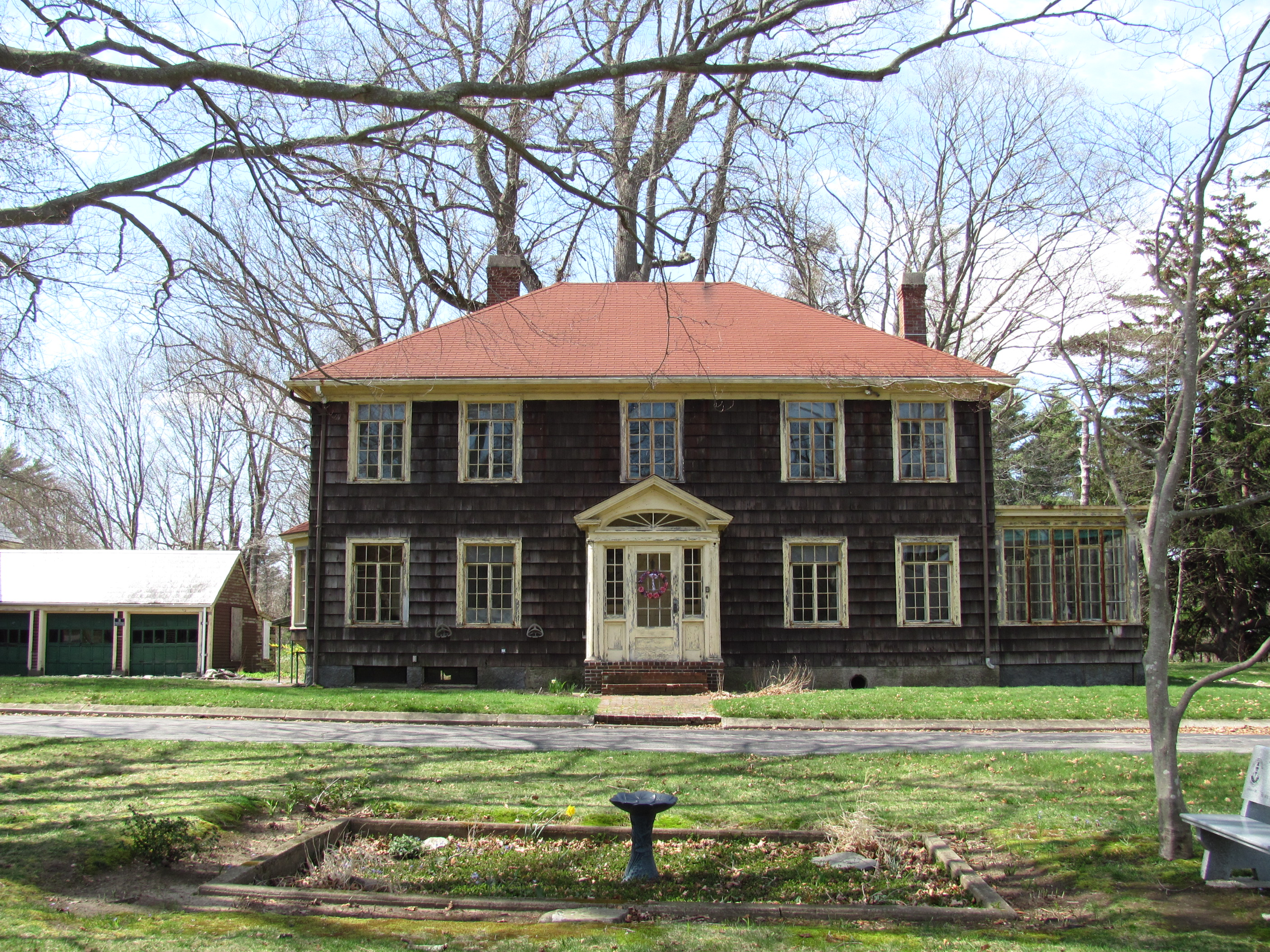
- Sachem Rock Farm

- Location within Massachusetts Location within the United States
- Location: East Bridgewater, Massachusetts
- Coordinates: 42°1′6″N 70°57′6″W
- Area: 31.6 acres (12.8 ha)
- Architectural style: Colonial Revival
- NRHP reference No.: 06001129
- Added to NRHP: December 11, 2006

Sachem Rock Farm is a historic farm at 355 Plymouth Street in East Bridgewater, Massachusetts, United States. The farm location is important for a variety of reasons. Its earliest historical association is with the Wampanoag people, who are known to have used the area, particularly around Sachem Rock, a granite outcrop they called Wonnocoote (Wonnocooto) that is the property's high point, prior to European contact. Sachem Rock itself is historically significant as the site of a meeting in 1649 between English settlers from the Plymouth Colony, including Myles Standish, with the Wampanoag sachem Massasoit. In this meeting the colonists purchased rights to a large tract of land, including East and West Bridgewater, Bridgewater, and Brockton.

The land around Sachem Rock was settled by 1665, with a farm and gristmill nearby on the Satucket River, and has seen agricultural uses ever since. The oldest buildings to survive are a complex of barns and other outbuildings built c. 1870 by Thomas Hewitt. The Hewitt farmhouse, built in 1869, burned down in 1926, and was replaced by the present two-story Colonial Revival wood-frame house by Henry Moorhouse. The property was purchased by the Town of East Bridgewater in 1998, and is now open to the public. Around 2012, the town renovated the two-story Colonial Revival wood-frame house, and replaced and connected a nearby barn, creating The Center at Sachem Rock which houses the town's Council on Aging. The facility is rented out as a function hall. Also on the property, during the planting months, residents maintain small gardening plots used for the East Bridgewater Community Gardens.

The farm was listed on the National Register of Historic Places in 2006. It is expected to yield archaeologically significant finds concerning its pre-contact uses, as well as the sites of houses, outbuildings, and industrial mills from the colonial period through the 19th century.

== See also ==
- National Register of Historic Places listings in Plymouth County, Massachusetts
