= Robbins Pond (Massachusetts) =

Lake of the United States of America

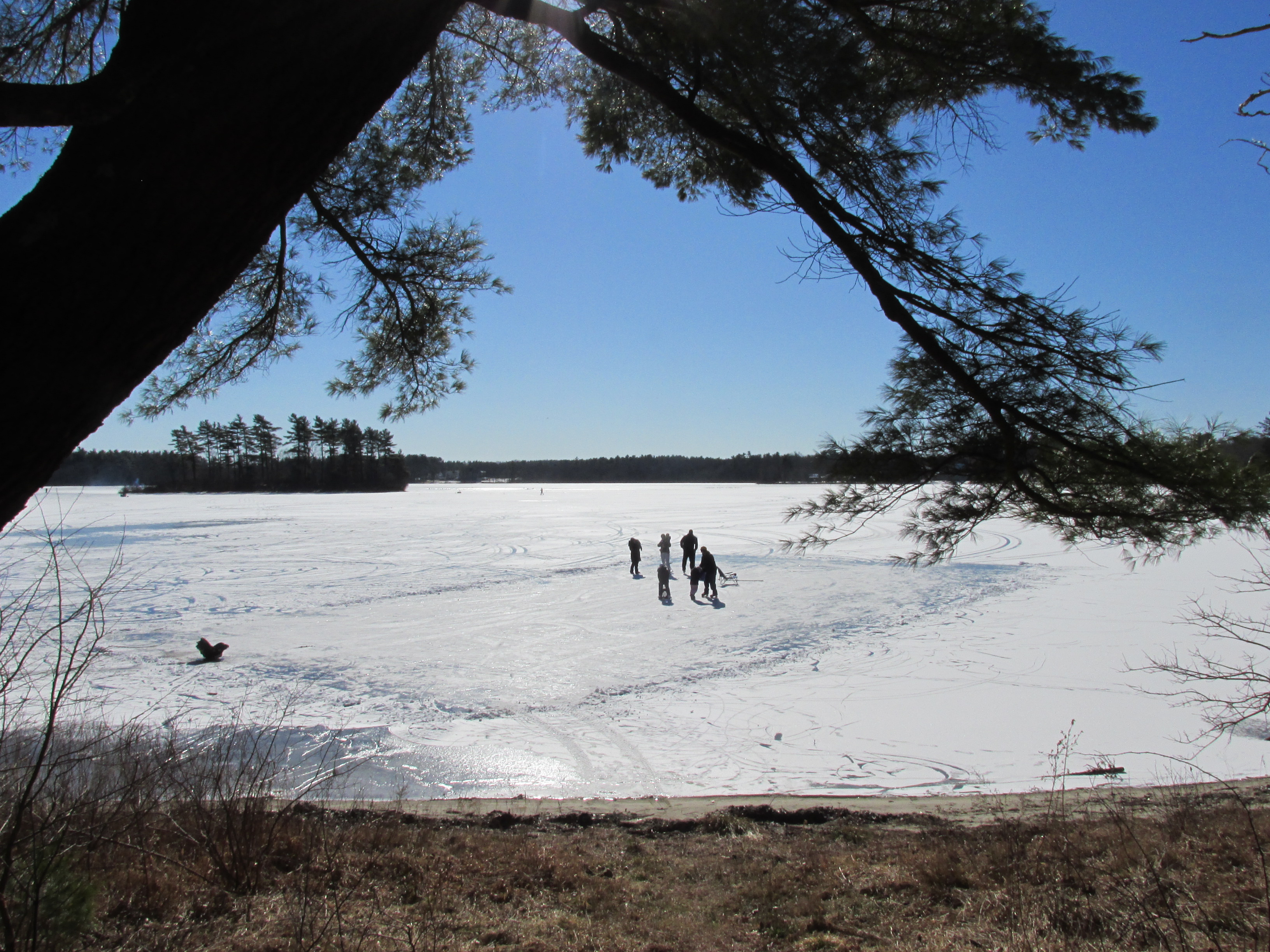
- Robbins Pond

- Location within Massachusetts Location within the United States
- Location: East Bridgewater and Halifax, Massachusetts
- Coordinates: 42°00′06″N 70°54′12″W
- Primary inflows: Poor Meadow Brook
- Primary outflows: Satucket River
- Basin countries: United States
- Surface area: 124 acres (50 ha)
- Average depth: 4 ft (1.2 m)
- Max. depth: 5 ft (1.5 m)

Robbins Pond is a 124-acre (0.50 km^{2}) warm water pond in East Bridgewater and Halifax, Massachusetts. It is part of the Taunton River Watershed. The inflow is Poor Meadow Brook, and the outflow is the Satucket River.The water is brown in color with a transparency of five feet, and the bottom is a mixture of sand and gravel. Average depth is four feet and maximum depth is just ten feet. There are 1.7 miles (2.7 km) of shoreline.

The pond is located off Pond Street in East Bridgewater, one mile (1.6 km) from Route 106. Access is an informal gravel launch area near the pond's outlet. It is suitable only for car top boats and canoes.
