= Massasoit =

Leader of the Wampanoag confederacy

- Ousamequin
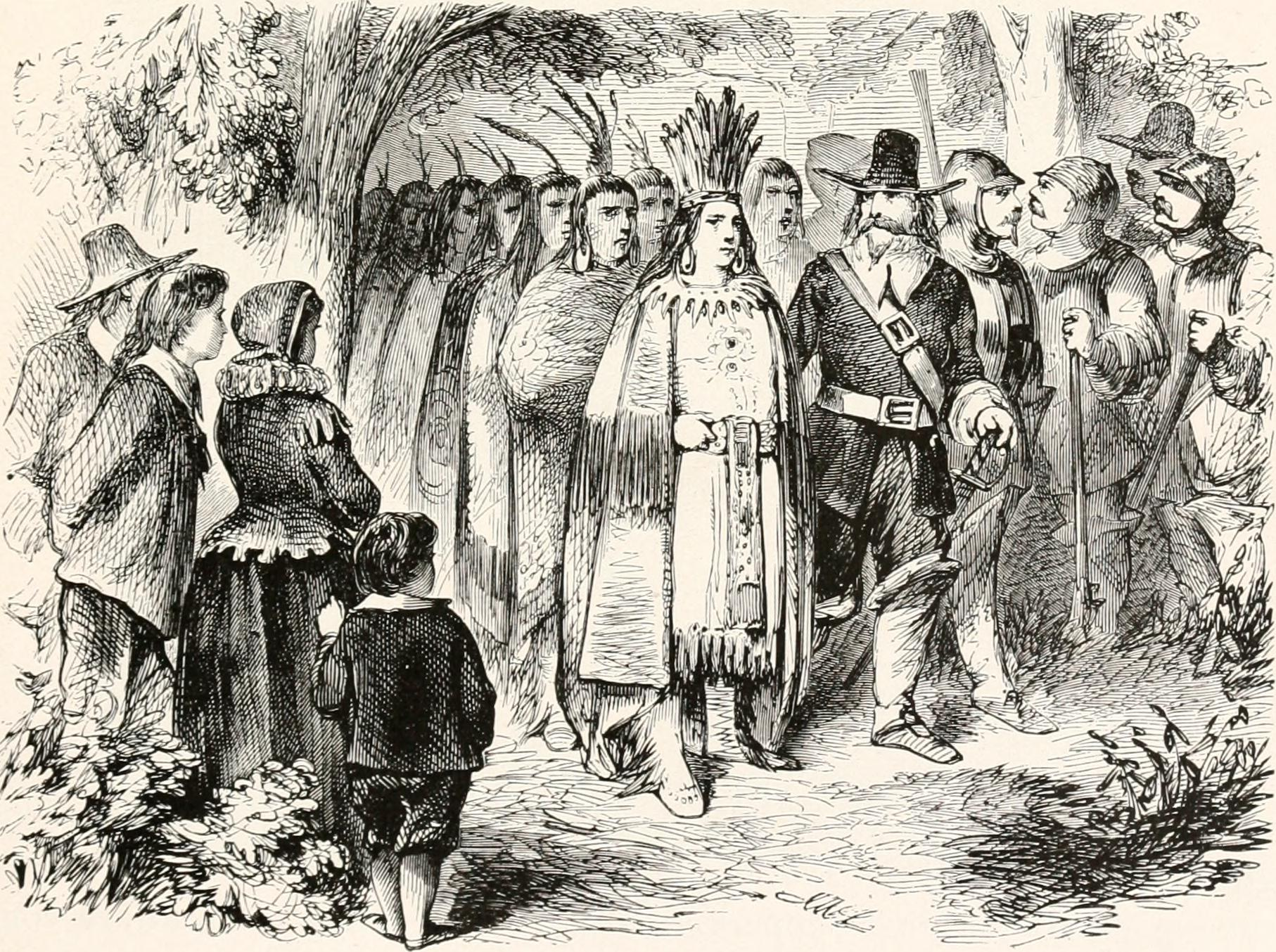
- Massasoit and his Warriors

Wampanoag leader
- Succeeded by: Wamsutta

Sachem

Personal details
- Born: Ousamequin c. 1581 present-day Bristol County, Rhode Island
- Died: 1661 (aged 80) likely present-day Rhode Island
- Relations: Zerviah Gould Mitchell (descendant)
- Children: Wamsutta (Alexander), Metacomet (Philip)
- Mother tongue: Wampanoag

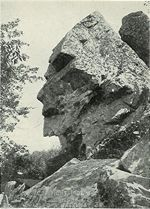
1904 photo of Profile Rock in Assonet, Massachusetts; local Wampanoags believe it represents Massasoit.

Massasoit Sachem (/ˌmæsəˈsɔɪ(ɪ)t/ MASS-ə-SOYT, -SOY-it) or Ousamequin (c. 1581 – 1661) was the sachem or leader of the Wampanoag confederacy. Massasoit means Great Sachem. Although Massasoit was only his title, English colonists mistook it as his name and it stuck.

Massasoit's people had been seriously weakened by a series of epidemics and were vulnerable to attacks by the Narragansetts, and he formed an alliance with the colonists at Plymouth Colony for defense against them. It was through his assistance that the Plymouth Colony avoided starvation during the early years.

== English at Plymouth ==
At the time of the pilgrims' arrival in Plymouth, the realm of the Wampanoag, also known as the Pokanokets, included parts of Rhode Island and much of southeastern Massachusetts. Massasoit lived in Sowams, a village at Pokanoket in Warren, Rhode Island. He held the allegiance of lesser Pokanoket sachems. In 1621, he sent Squanto to live among the colonists at Plymouth.

Outbreaks of an unidentified disease had devastated the Pokanokets, and Massasoit sought an alliance with the colonies of New England against the neighboring Narragansetts who controlled an area west of Narragansett Bay in Rhode Island. Samoset was a minor Abenaki sachem (sagamore) who hailed from the Muscongus Bay area of Maine, and he learned to speak English from fishermen who plied those waters. Massasoit sent him to approach the colonists to find out whether their intentions were peaceful.

Massasoit forged critical political and personal ties with colonial leaders William Bradford, Edward Winslow, Stephen Hopkins, John Carver, and Myles Standish, ties which grew out of a peace treaty negotiated on March 22, 1621. The alliance ensured that the Pokanokets remained neutral during the Pequot War in 1636. According to English sources, Massasoit prevented the failure of Plymouth Colony and the starvation that the Pilgrims faced during its earliest years.

== Lasting alliance ==
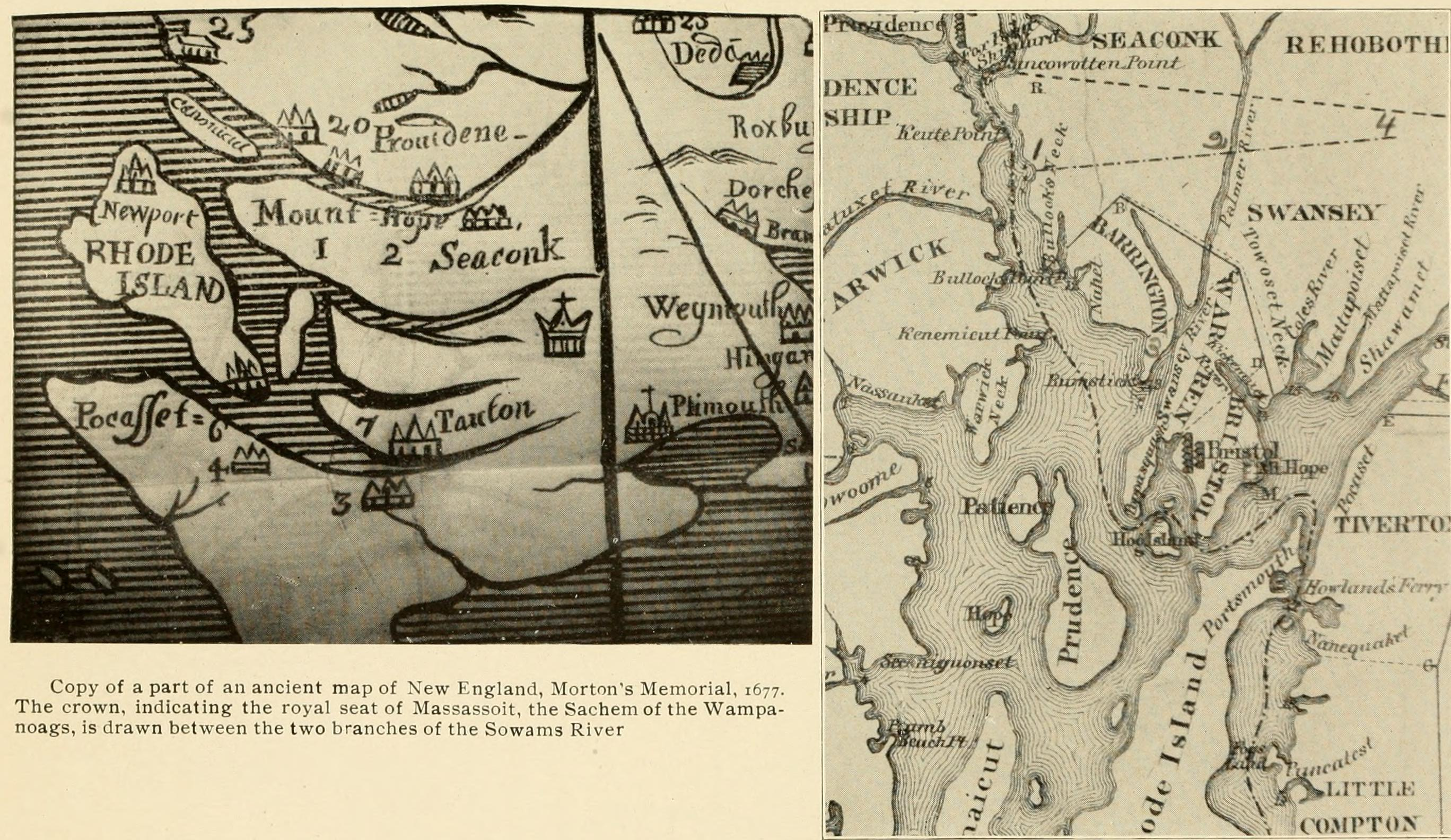
Part of A Map of New England, 1677. The crown, indicating the royal seat of Massasoit, lies between the two branches of the Sowams River.

Some tension continued between Massasoit and the colonists when they refused to give up Squanto, whom Massasoit presumed to have betrayed him. This was resolved in March 1623 when Massasoit was gravely ill and Edward Winslow nursed him back to health. After his recovery, Winslow reports that Massasoit said, "the English are my friends and love me ... whilst I live I will never forget this kindness they have showed me." In return for their kindness, Massasoit warned them of a plot against them. He had learned that a group of influential Massachusett warriors intended to destroy both the Wessagusset and Plymouth colonies, and he warned the Pilgrims in time.

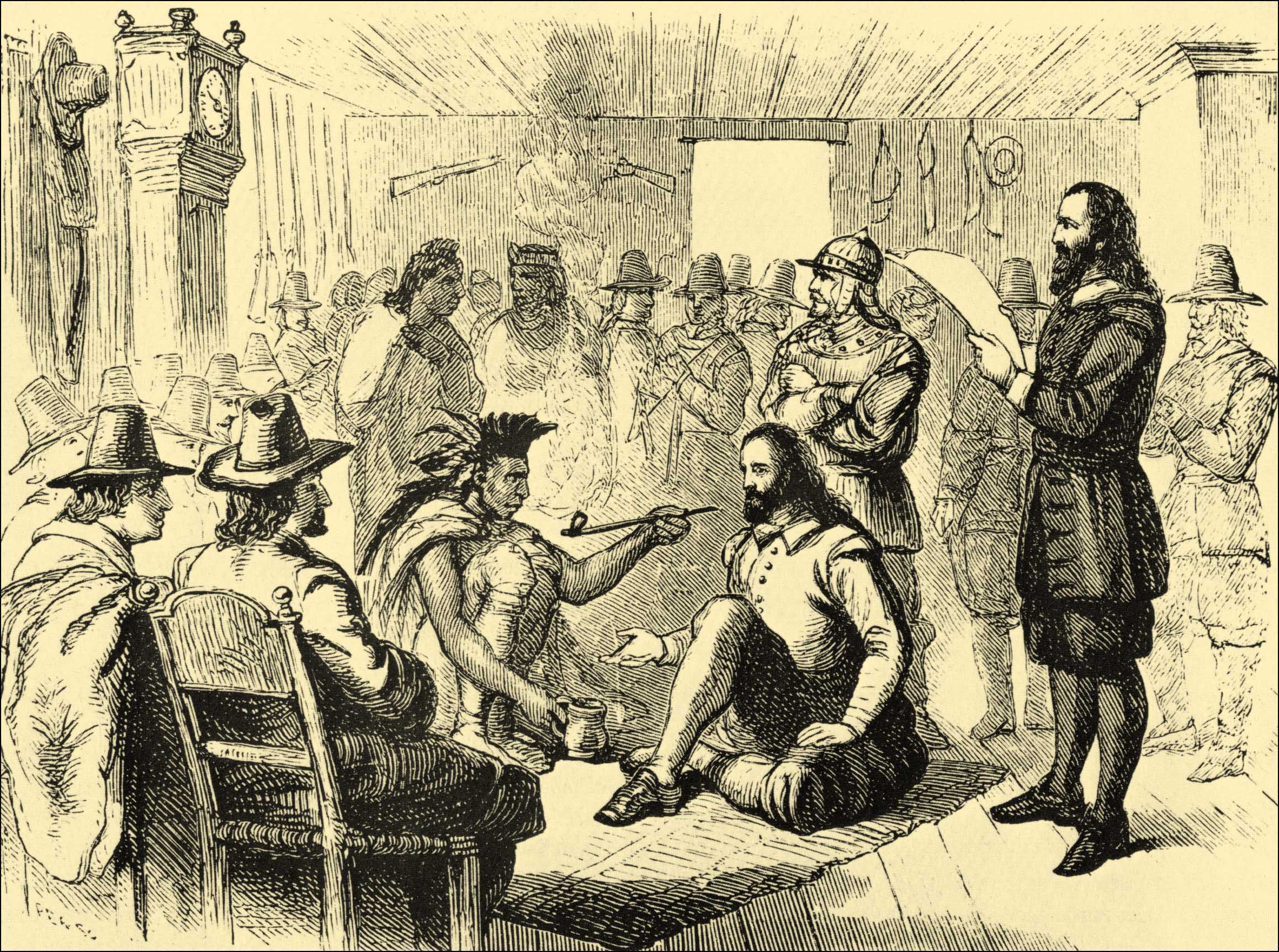
Massasoit smoking a ceremonial pipe with Governor John Carver in Plymouth, 1621 as imagined by a 19th century engraver

The alliance came under other tension in later years, as the colonists expanded into new lands in order to support their growing colony. Massasoit sold a tract of land 14 miles square to Myles Standish and others of Duxbury in 1649 to alleviate tension and maintain the peace. The sale took place atop Sachem Rock, an outcropping on the Satucket River in East Bridgewater, Massachusetts. The site is listed on the National Register of Historic Places.

== Children ==
Massasoit had five children: son Wamsutta, who was born between 1621 and 1625; son Pometecomet, Metacomet, or Metacom; son Sonkanuchoo; and daughters Amie and Sarah. Soon after Massasoit's death, Wamsutta and Metacomet went to Plymouth and asked the Pilgrims to give them English names. The court named them Alexander and Philip. Wamsutta, the eldest, became sachem of the Pokanokets on the death of his father. He died within a year, and his brother Metacom succeeded him in 1662. Amie married Tispaquin and was the only one of Massasoit's five children to survive King Philip's War in 1676.

== Legacy ==
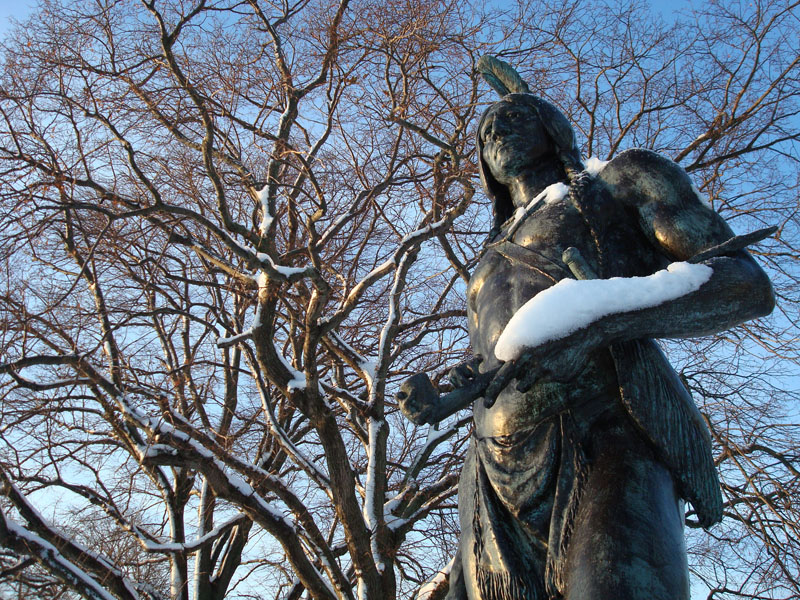
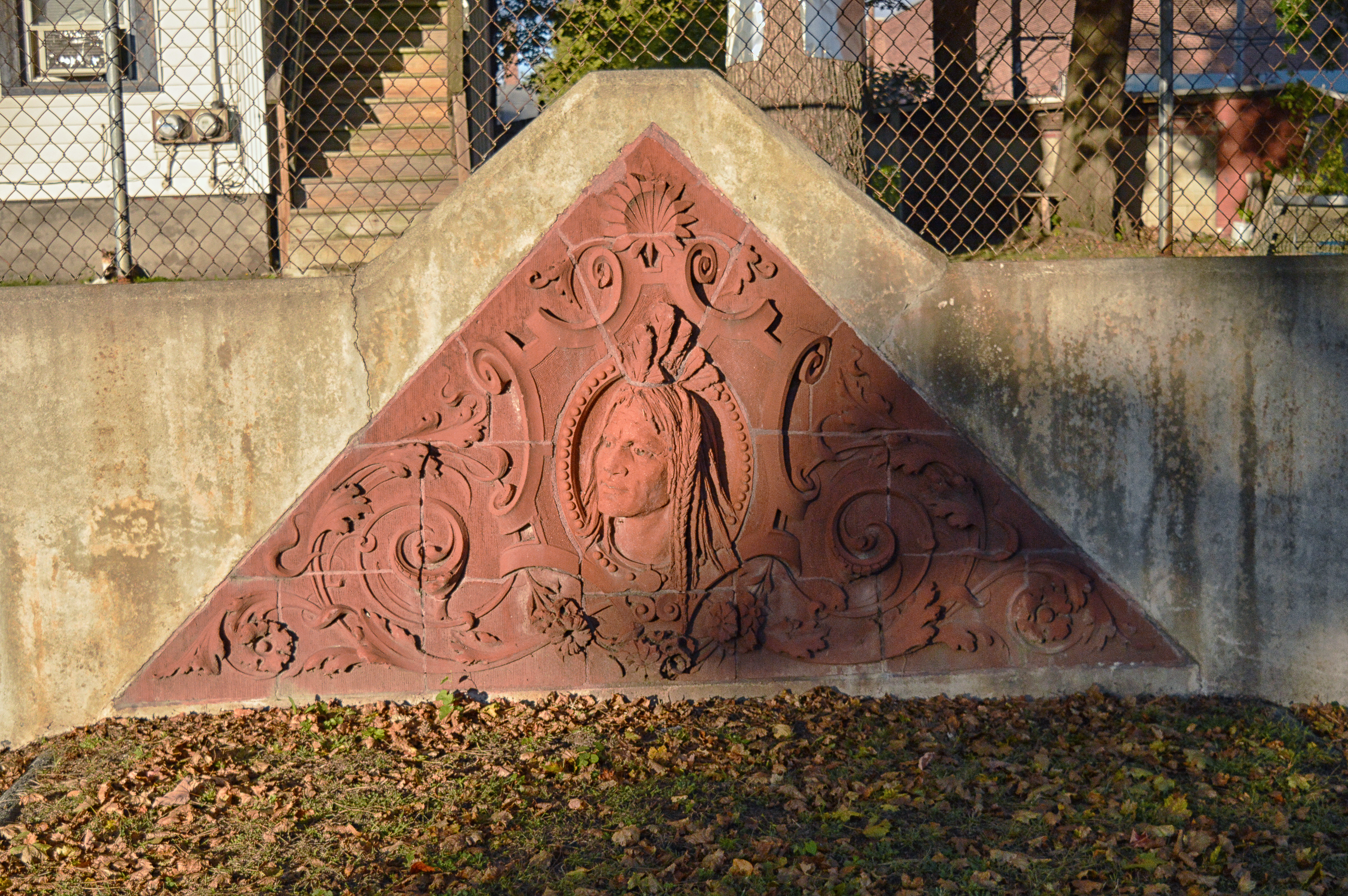
Statue of Massasoit in Plymouth, overlooking the site of Plymouth Rock; a relief portrait of Massasoit salvaged from the gable of the former Massasoit Block in Holyoke

Roger Williams fled the Massachusetts Bay Colony to avoid arrest and deportation for religious reasons and stayed the winter of 1635–36 with Massasoit, who gave him land along the Seekonk River the following spring. Governor Winslow advised Williams to move his settlement to the other side of the river because his current location was within the bounds of Plymouth Colony. Williams did so and founded Providence Plantations, which later became part of the Colony of Rhode Island.

The half century of peace that Massasoit so assiduously maintained collapsed soon after his death. Wamsutta broke away from his father's diplomacy and began an alliance with Connecticut Colony.

Sources describe Massasoit as humane and honest, that he kept his word, and endeavored to imbue his people with a love for peace. He kept the Pilgrims advised of any warlike designs toward them by other tribes. It is unclear when Massasoit died. Some accounts claim that it was as early as 1660; others contend that he died as late as 1662. He was anywhere from 80 to 90 at the time.

Wamsutta died suddenly within a year of his succession, and Massasoit's second son Metacom became sachem of the Pokanokets and chief sachem of the Greater Wampanoag Confederacy. He concluded that Wamsutta had been murdered at the hands of the Colonists, and this was one of the factors that led to King Philip's War, one of the bloodiest wars in Colonial American history.

A statue of Massasoit by sculptor Cyrus E. Dallin stands near Plymouth Rock, with others outside the Utah State Capitol building, on the campus of Brigham Young University, at the Springville Museum of Art in Springville, Utah, and in Kansas City, Missouri at the corner of Main Street and Emanuel Cleaver II Blvd. In Massachusetts, both Massasoit Community College and Massasoit State Park are named for him.

== Gallery ==
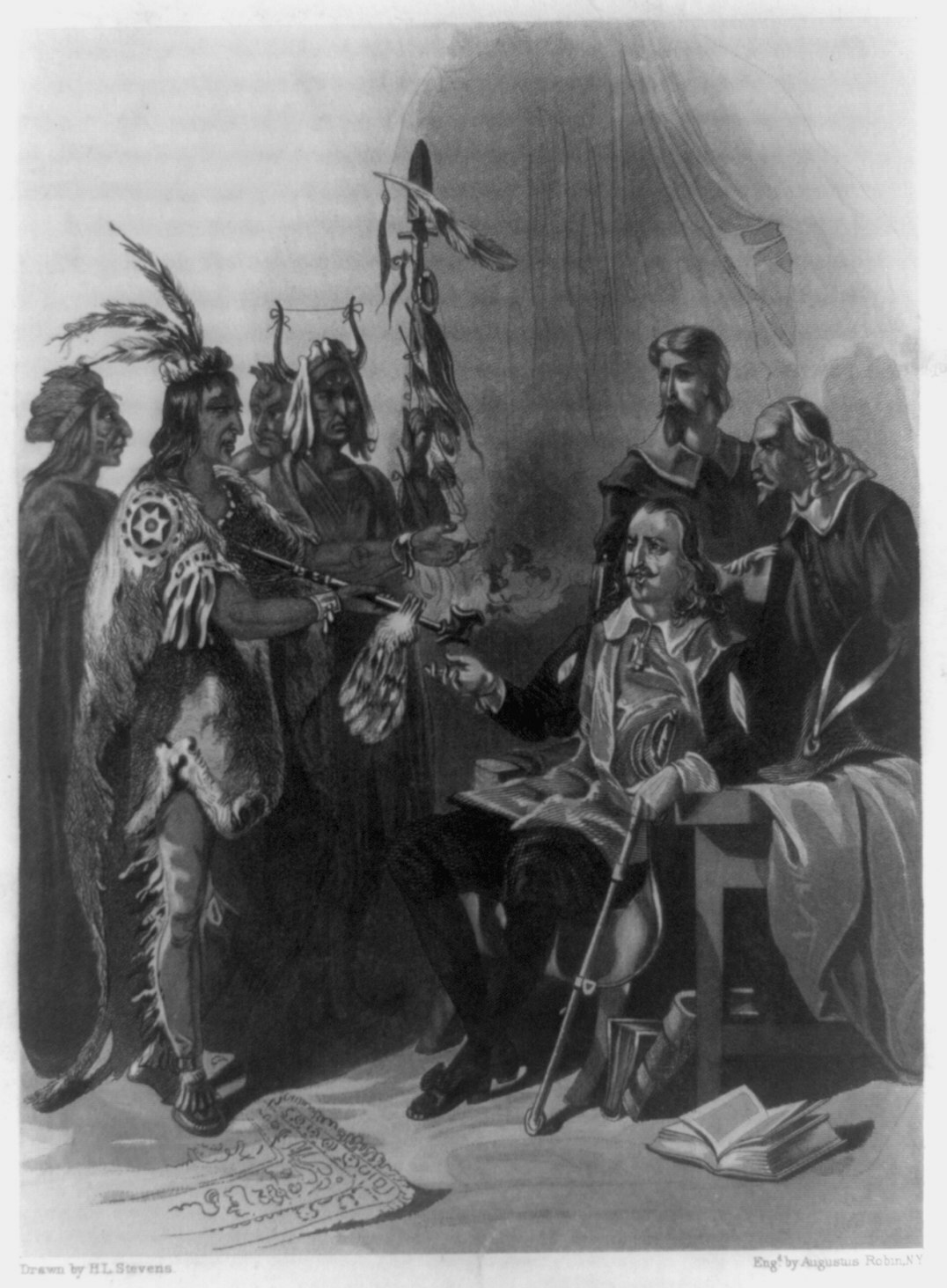
Meeting of Governor Carver and Massasoit

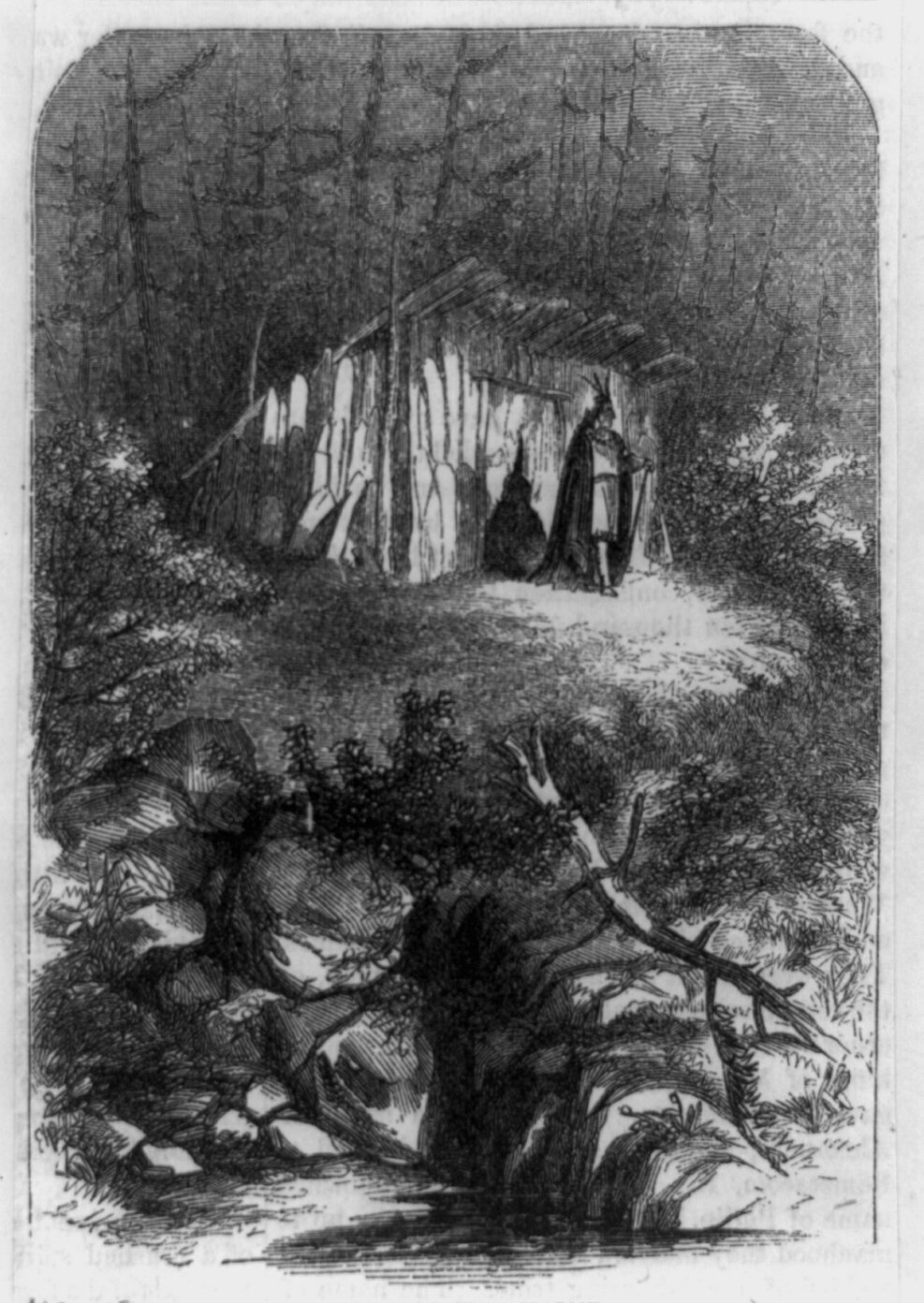
The Palace of Massasoit

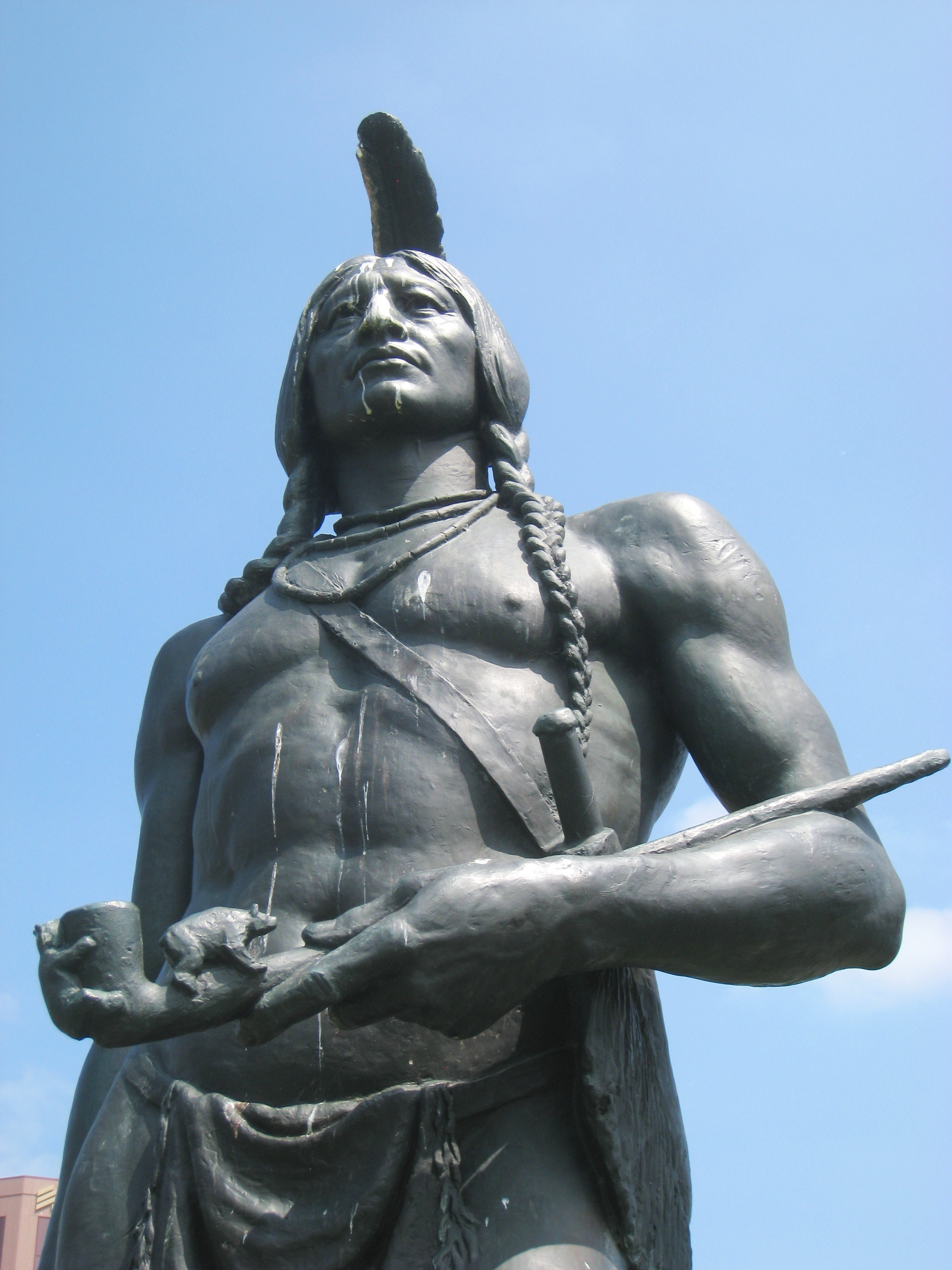
Sculpture of Ousamequin in Mill Creek Park, Kansas City, Missouri by Cyrus E. Dallin

== See also ==
- List of early settlers of Rhode Island

== Sources ==
- "Native People" (page), "Massasoit (Ousamequin) Sachem" (section), MayflowerFamilies.com, webpage: MFcom-Native.
- Bicknell, Thomas Williams (1908). Sowams, with Ancient Records of Sowams and Parts Adjacent. New Haven: Associated Publishers of American Records.
- Winslow, Edward (1624). Good Newes from New England. London.
- Nathaniel Philbrick, Mayflower: A Story of Courage, Community, and War, New York 2006.
