= Thomas McKeller =

American model (1890–1962)

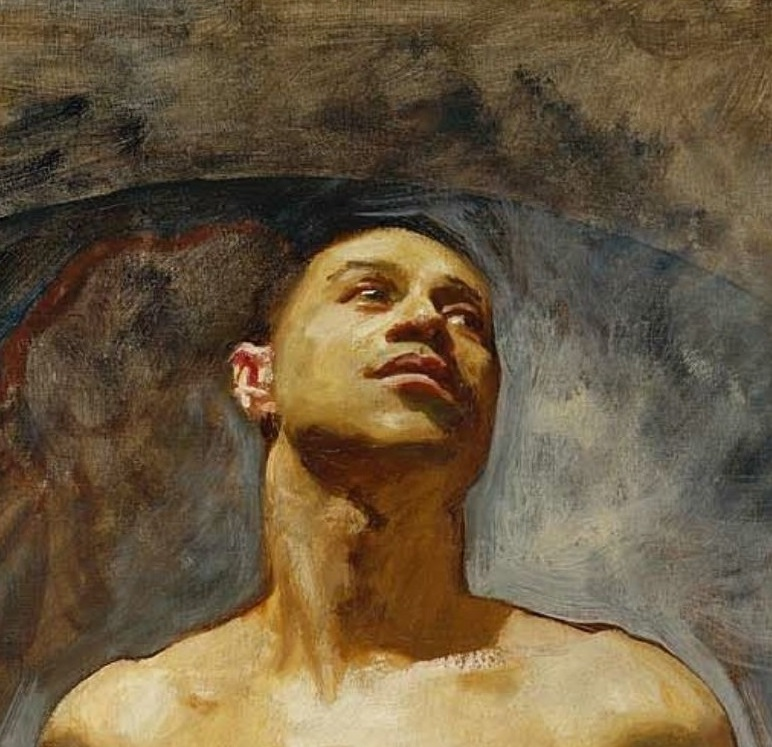
- Portrait of Thomas McKeller by John Singer Sargent circa 1917–1920
- Born: Thomas Eugene McKeller; 1890; Wilmington, North Carolina, U.S.
- Died: 1962 (aged 71–72); Boston, Massachusetts, U.S.
- Resting place: Mount Hope Cemetery
- Occupations: Model, postal worker

Thomas Eugene McKeller (1890–1962) was an American model who posed for John Singer Sargent between 1916 and the artist's death in 1925. McKeller served as a model for many of Sargent's paintings. In the 2000s, McKeller drew critical attention for the complex dynamics of race, class, and gender that he embodied.

== Biography ==
Born in Wilmington, North Carolina in 1890, McKeller moved to Boston as a teenager. He was likely seeking better-paying jobs and social mobility and to escape Wilmington's racial violence and segregation. Scholars and descendants have speculated that he was also seeking a new life on account of his sexual orientation.

In 1916, McKeller was working as an elevator operator at Boston's luxurious Hôtel Vendôme when he met John Singer Sargent, a 60-year-old American artist who had been living in Europe for the previous 13 years. Sargent invited McKeller to pose for a mural cycle over the Fenway entrance of Boston's Museum of Fine Arts. Over the next eight years, Sargent also completed hundreds of charcoal drawings of McKeller both for his project at the Museum of Fine Arts and a second mural cycle commission at Harvard University's Widener Library. These murals depicted figures and scenes from classical mythology. McKeller inspired and modeled for many of the figures, including two images of Apollo, one of Eros, one of Atlas, and a bas-relief of Arion. However, all these figures were portrayed as white, retaining the facial features and physique but not the Blackness of the model.

In addition to modeling for these murals, McKeller posed for Sargent's portrait of Harvard president Abbott Lawrence Lowell in 1923. He served as the model for sculptor Cyrus Edwin Dallin's statue of Wampanoag leader Massasoit in 1921. Sargent later gifted nine of his charcoal drawings of McKeller to his patron Isabella Stewart Gardner, who passed them on to the Isabella Stewart Gardner Museum. Gardner used a wheelchair, so on at least one occasion, McKeller carried her up the stairs of Sargent's third-floor studio in Back Bay. Writing in The New York Times a century later, Alina Tugend called McKeller "John Singer Sargent's Secret Muse".

McKeller served four months in the U.S. Army during World War I. Drafted in September 1918, he trained with the 811th Pioneer Infantry, an all-Black regiment. The war ended in armistice before he could see combat, and he was discharged in December 1918.

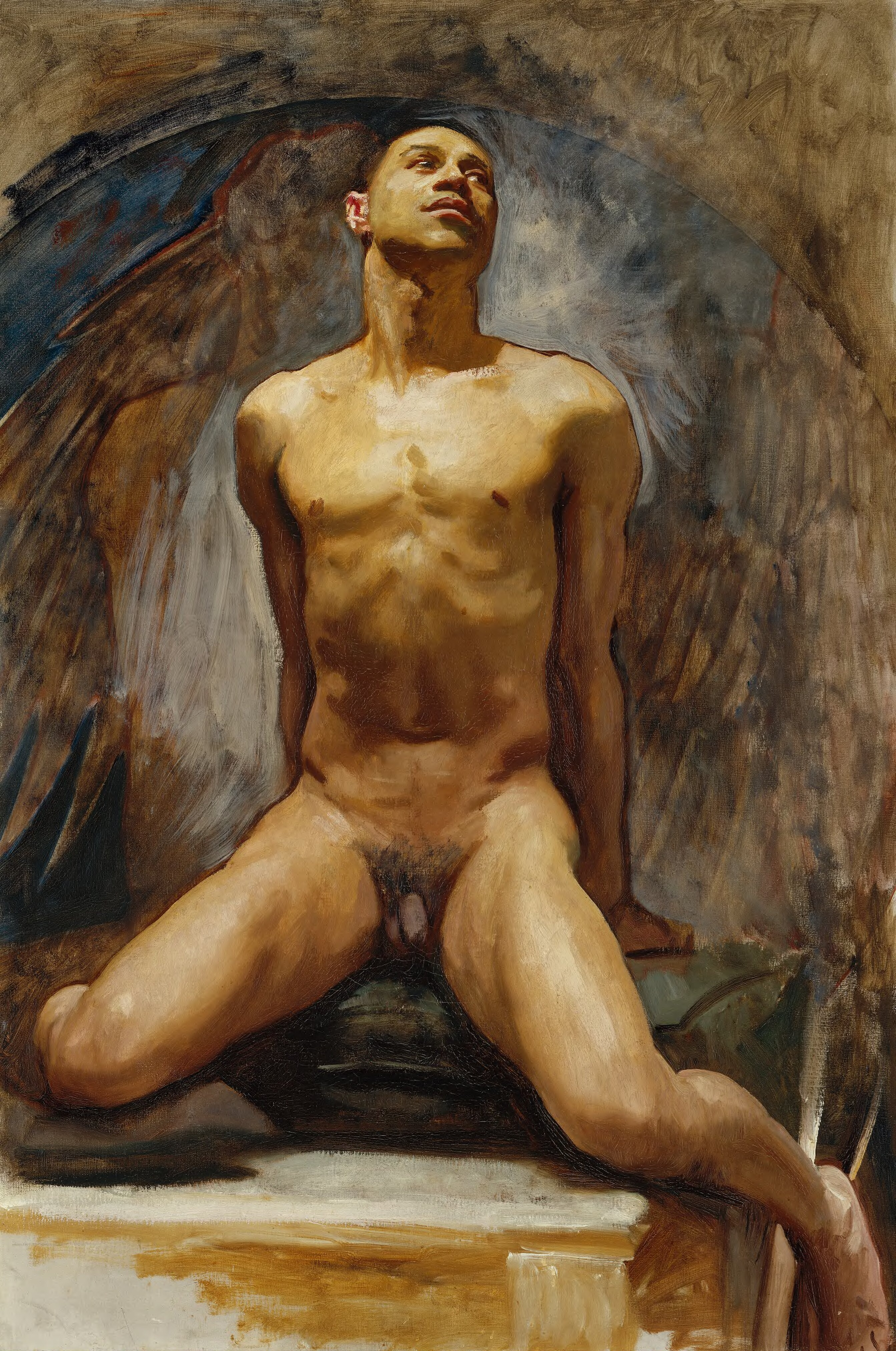
Sargent's Nude Study of Thomas McKeller c.1917

By the time Sargent died in 1925, McKeller had settled into a career as a postal worker in Boston, achieving economic security. After Sargent's death, he wrote to the artist's executor seeking money to pay off a loan and received $10. In contrast, Sargent had received $40,000 as partial payment for the museum murals alone, testifying to the wealth gap between artist and muse.

McKeller married Noreina Elizabeth Meads in 1934, purchased a home in south Boston's Roxbury neighborhood, and lived there out of the public eye until his death on July 15, 1962. He was buried next to his wife in Mount Hope Cemetery in the Dorchester neighborhood nearby.

== Portrait ==
Sargent painted Nude Study of Thomas McKeller between 1917 and 1920. This oil on canvas painting depicts a nude McKeller seated, perched on a pillow, body tensed, legs akimbo, and head tilted back in a heroic pose in front of an aureole of amorphous feathery wings. His brown skin is bathed in rich golden light. The painting may have started out as a study for Prometheus. Sargent never publicly exhibited the portrait but kept it on display in his studio. New York Times art critic Holland Cotter observed, "It's a transfixed and transfixing image, sensual, aspirational. And I would say homoerotic." Curator Guy McElroy described the portrait as "redolent with a fluid naturalism and heroic posture." Historian Michael Henry Adams deemed it "resonant of a conception of not just black humanity but of an African American nobility."

After Sargent's death, the painting, dubbed Portrait of a Negro Nude, wound up at the Museum of Fine Arts. In 1932, William James Jr., a painter and nephew of Henry James, took possession of the painting, possibly to use in teaching. The painting disappeared for decades, until curator Trevor Fairbrother noticed it in storage at the Boston Athenæum and purchased it for the Museum of Fine Arts in 1986. In 1995, Yusef Komunyakaa published "Nude Study", his poetic response to the portrait, in The Kenyon Review.

In 2020, the Isabella Stewart Gardner Museum's exhibition "Boston's Apollo: Thomas McKeller and John Singer Sargent," featuring the portrait, received critical acclaim in The Guardian, The New York Times, The Burlington Magazine, and Apollo.
