= Massasoit (statue) =

Statue in Plymouth, Massachusetts, U.S.

Coordinates: 41°57′28″N 70°39′45″W

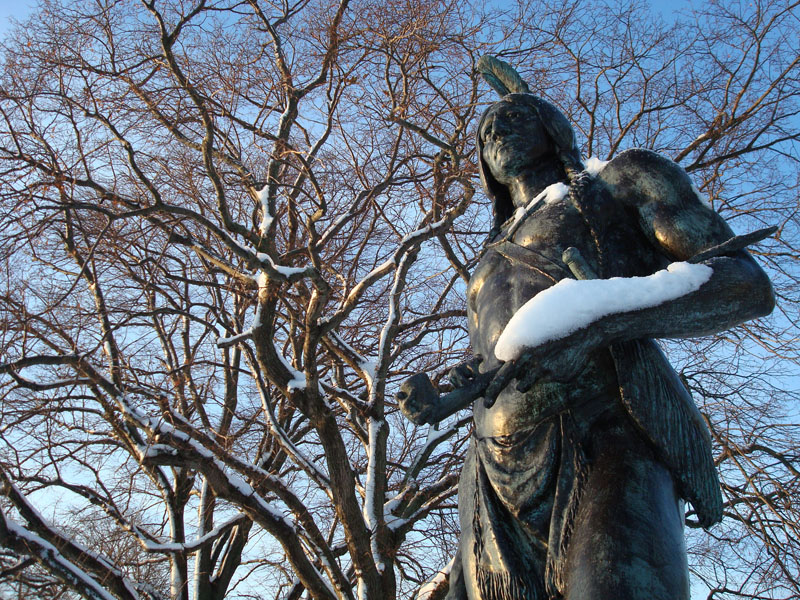
- Artist: Cyrus Dallin
- Completion date: 1921
- Location: Plymouth, Massachusetts, U.S.

Massasoit is a statue by the American sculptor Cyrus Edwin Dallin in Plymouth, Massachusetts. It was completed in 1921 to mark the tricentenary of the Pilgrims' landing. The sculpture is meant to represent the Pokanoket leader Massasoit welcoming the Pilgrims on the occasion of the first Thanksgiving.

Several replicas of the statue exist across the United States, including numerous small-scale souvenir reproductions. Dallin used Thomas McKeller, a young black man who also modeled for painter John Singer Sargent, as his model for Massasoit.

== History ==
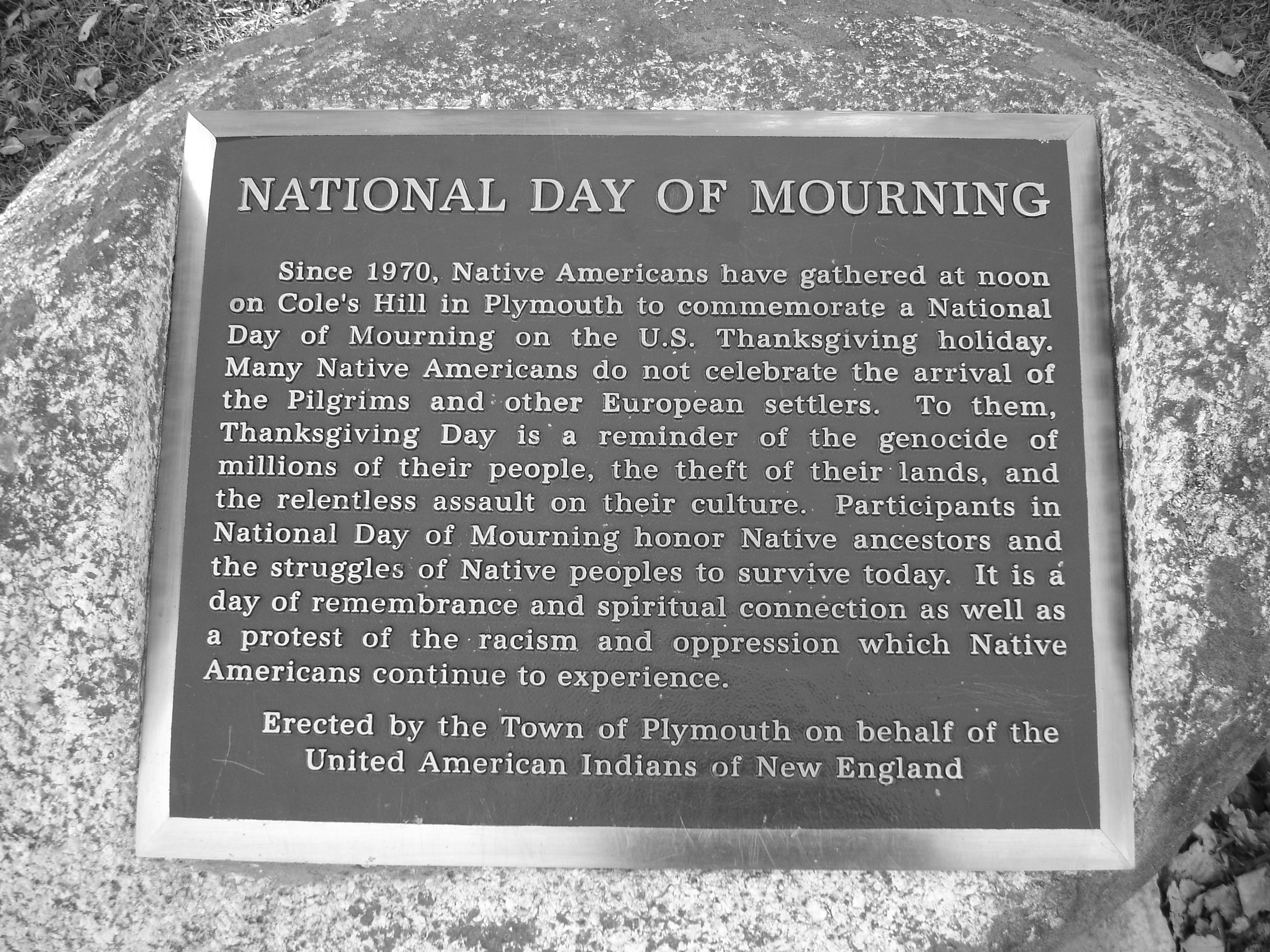
National Day of Mourning plaque

The Improved Order of Red Men fraternal organization commissioned the statue for the 1921 Pilgrim Tercentenary. Despite the group's name, they only allowed white male members at that time. Massasoit's last surviving relative, Wootonekanuske, was invited to the statue's unveiling. The statue sits atop Cole's Hill in Plymouth, Massachusetts, across from Plymouth Rock. Historian Lis Blee criticized it for reflecting settler colonialism.

An annual protest occurs at the statue on Thanksgiving Day in order to reclaim the space for Native Americans. The National Day of Mourning began in 1970 and the United American Indians of New England continues the event to correct historical inaccuracies around the holiday and to raise awareness for Indigenous issues. The Town of Plymouth later added a plaque near the statue to acknowledge the annual tradition.

== Replicas ==
Replicas of the statue are located at:

- Statue of Massasoit (Salt Lake City), in the Utah State Capitol in Salt Lake City. Dallin, a Utah native, donated the cast to the State of Utah a year after the original statue was erected.
- Brigham Young University in Provo, Utah
- The Dayton Art Institute in Dayton, Ohio
- Mill Creek Park in Kansas City, Missouri
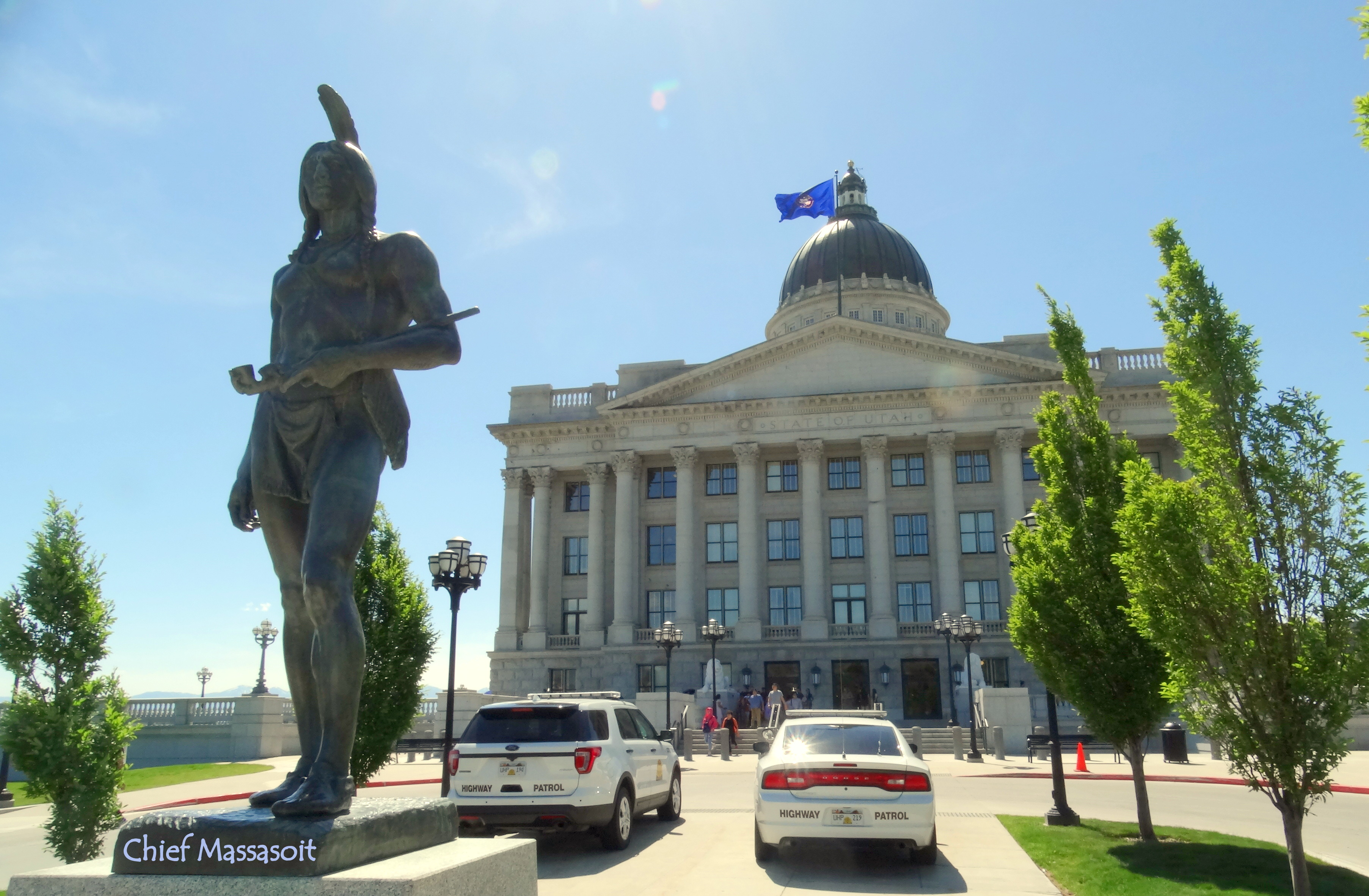
The statue at the Utah State Capitol

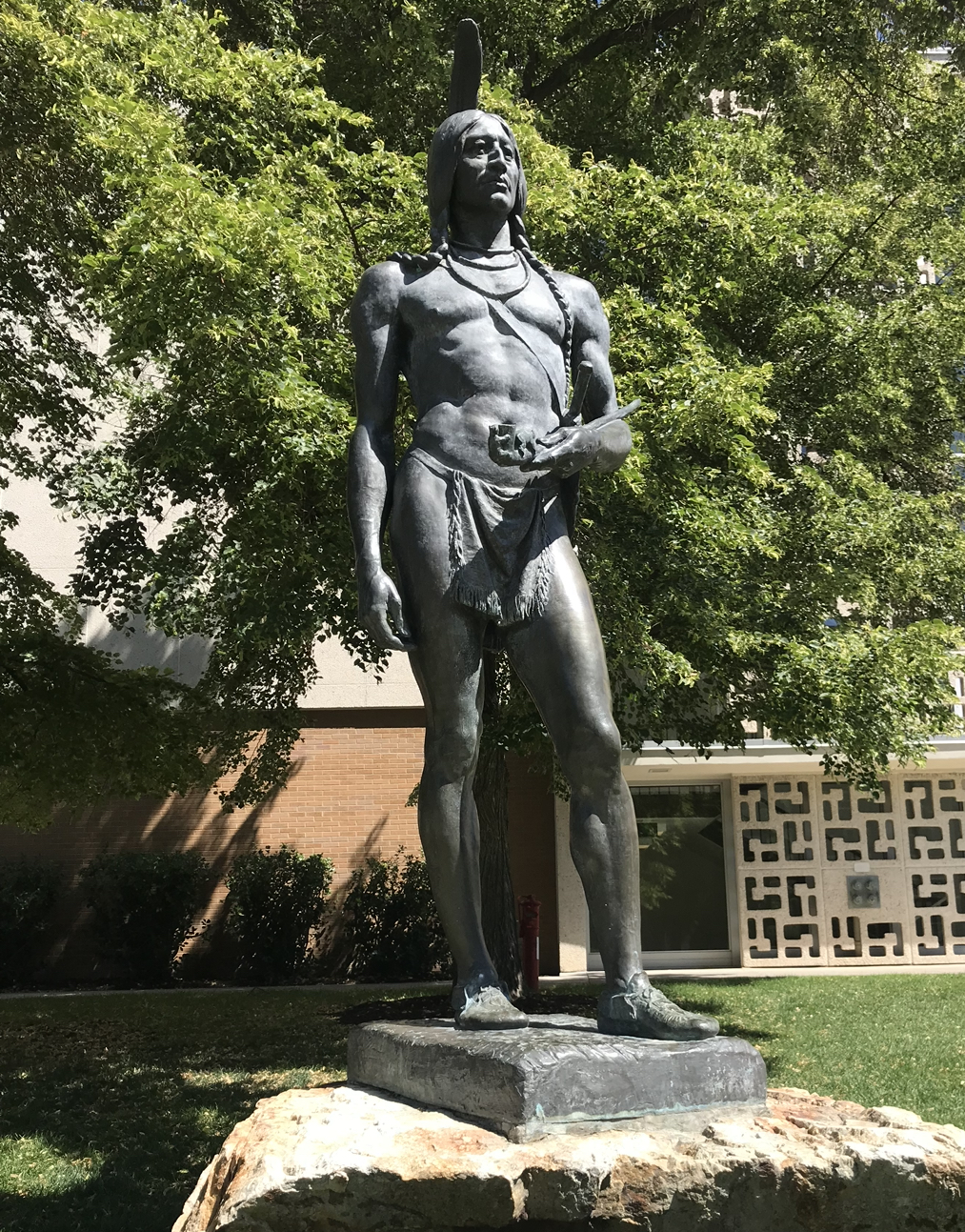
Brigham Young University

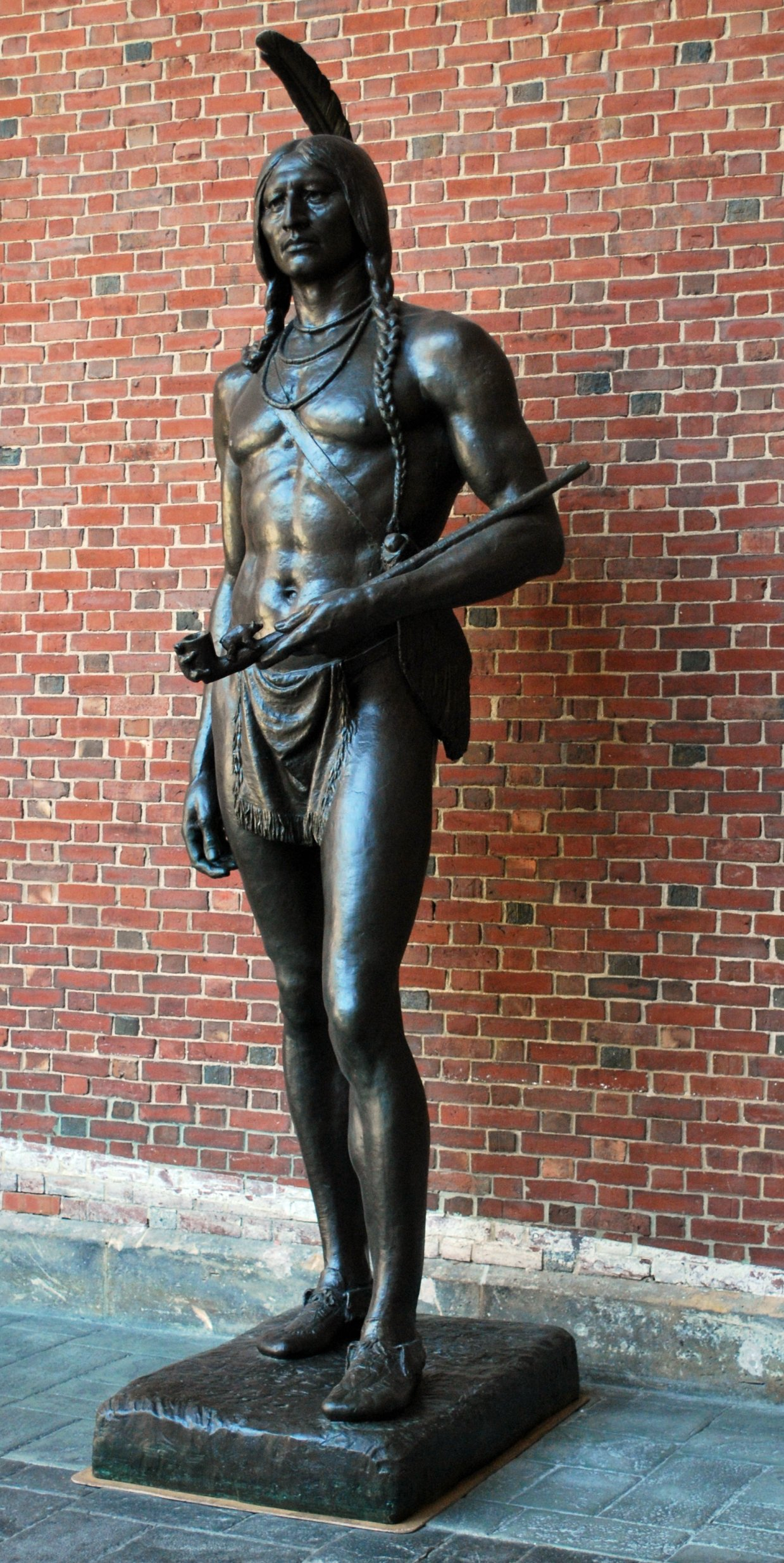
Dayton Art Institute

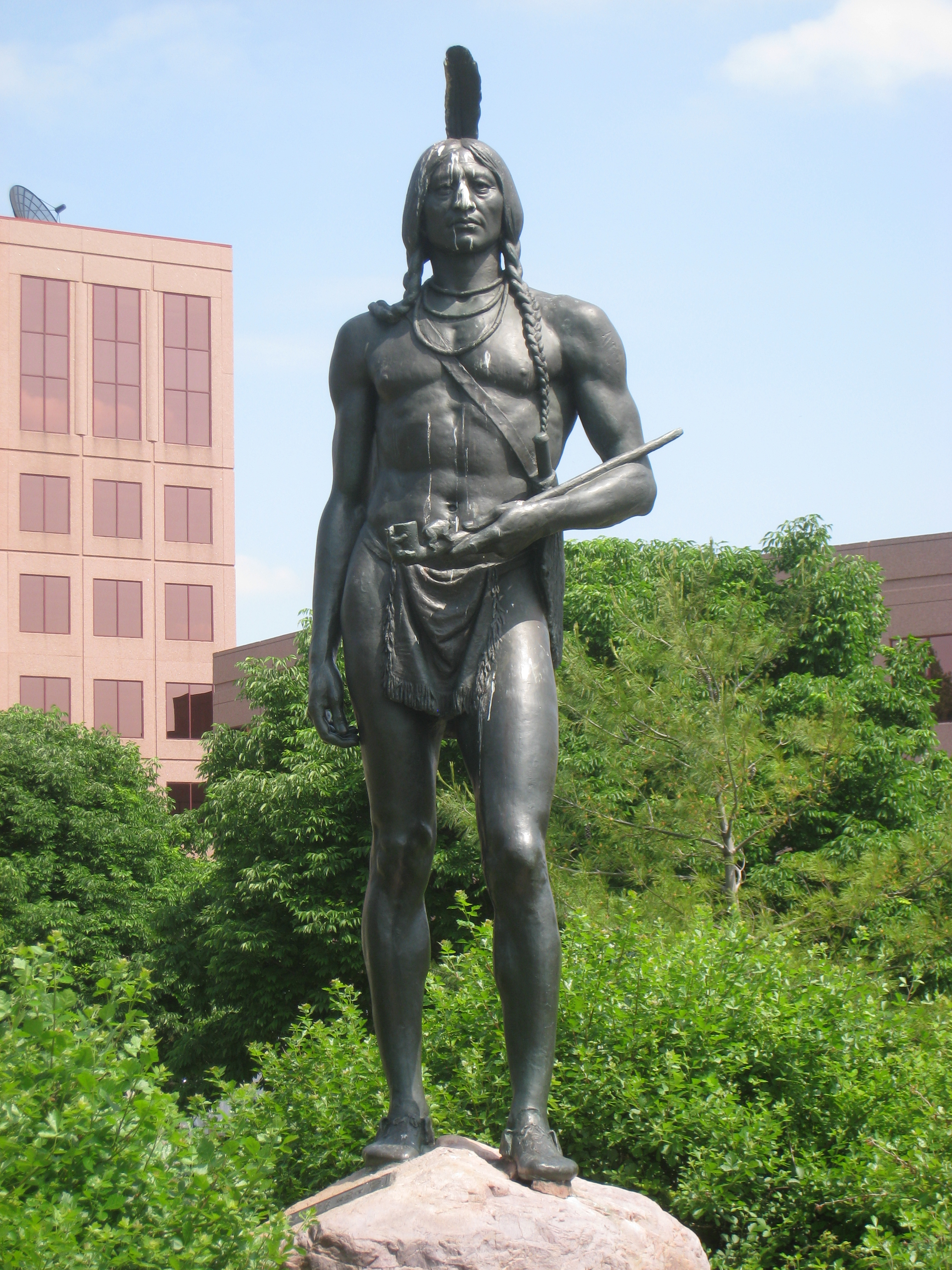
Kansas City, Missouri

== See also ==
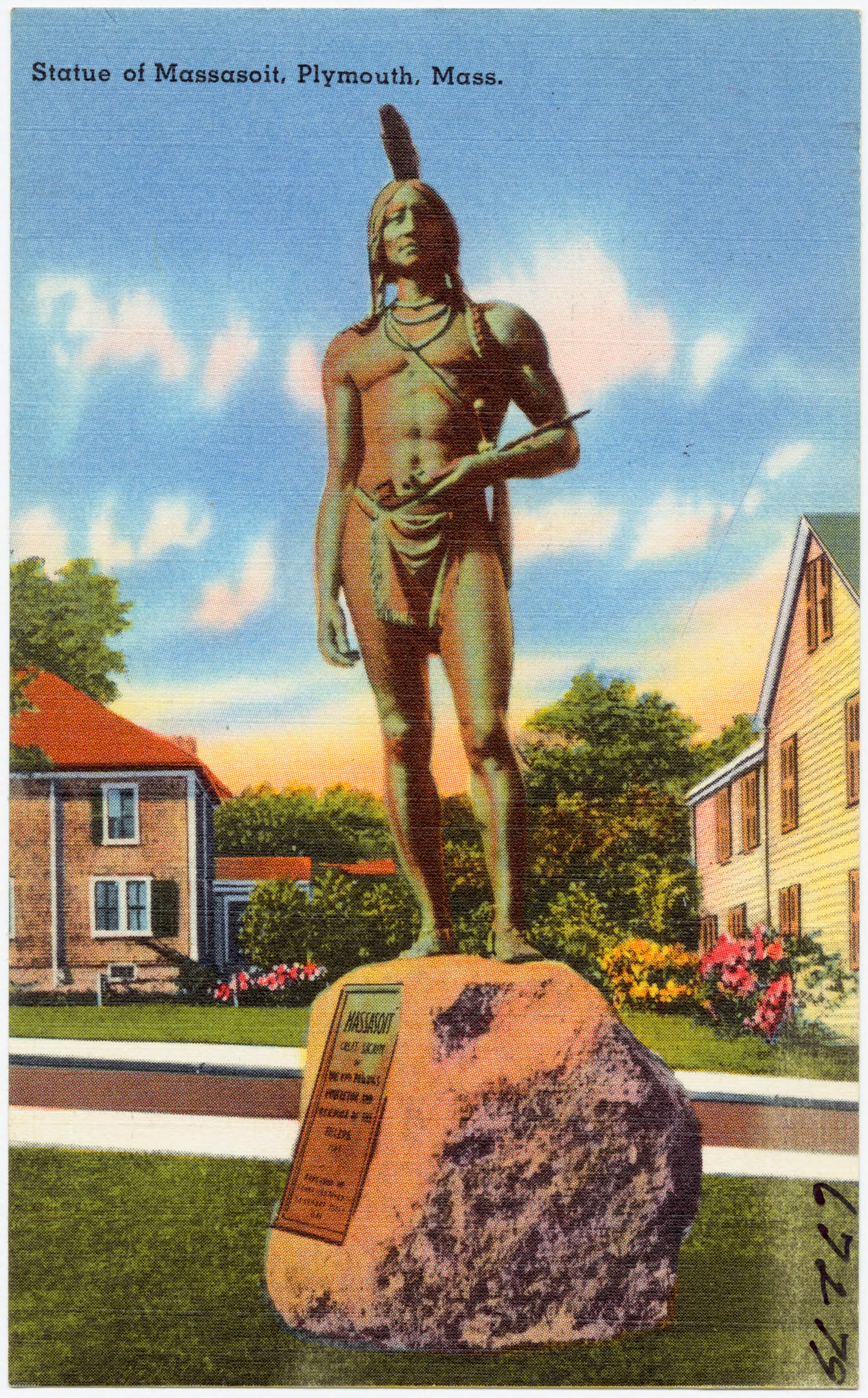
Antique postcard, circa 1930-1945

- Pilgrim Tercentenary half dollar
- List of sculptures by Cyrus Dallin in Massachusetts
- List of Improved Order of Red Men buildings and structures
