= Satucket River =

River in the United States of America

Coordinates: 42°00′45″N 70°57′16″W

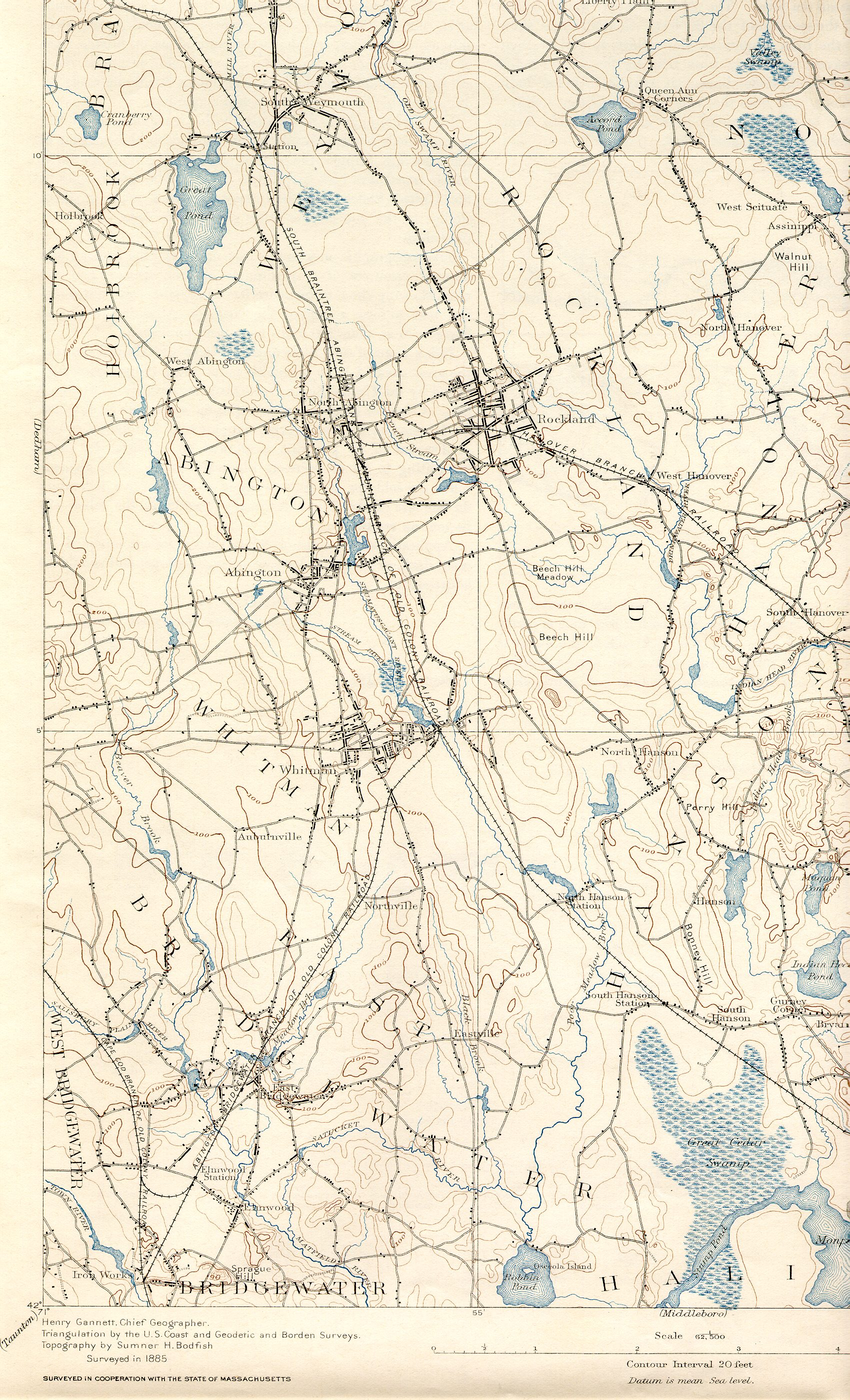
Satucket River and environs

The Satucket River is 5.5-mile-long (8.9 km) river in southeastern Massachusetts within the Taunton River Watershed. It flows generally west from Robbins Pond in East Bridgewater, and into the Matfield River.

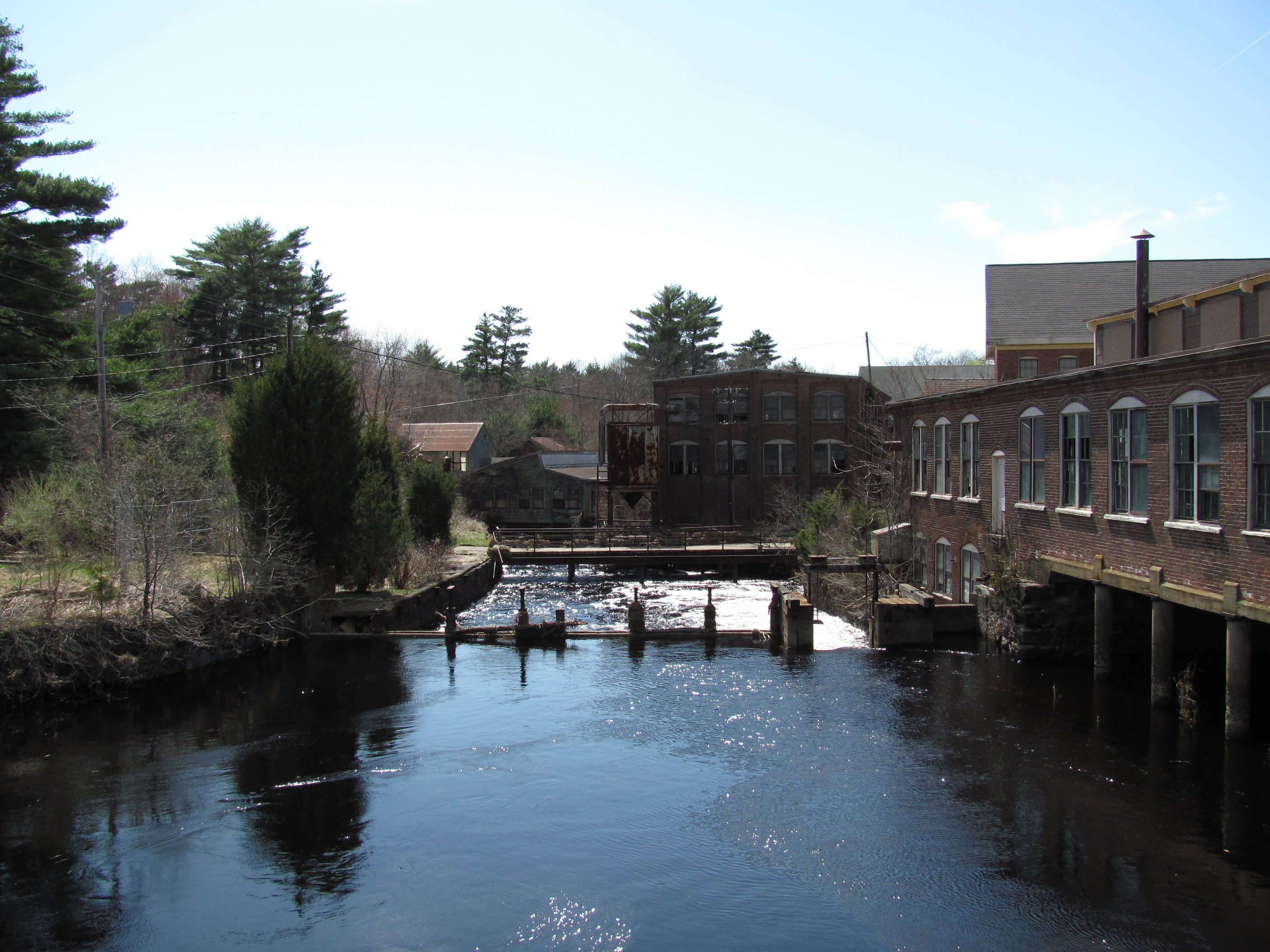
Satucket River at Plymouth Street

The Satucket River drains a watershed of 34.9 square miles and 700 acres of natural ponds."Satucket River, East Bridgewater Mass. Fish Passage and Boating Improvement Project". It includes parts of Abington, Whitman, Hanson, East Bridgewater and Halifax. The river is rich with iron and has a tint the color of tea. It is generally slow-moving water and relatively shallow, no more than 8 feet deep, even in its deepest spots. It is fed by the Poor Meadow Brook that takes in the flow of the Shumatuscacant River, which drains into Abington and Whitman. Poor Meadow Brook then joins the Satucket just below Robbins Pond in East Bridgewater."Satucket River, below Robins Pond in East Bridgewater". Robbins Pond, which is another body of water in East Bridgewater, is a 124-acre natural warm water pond. Its predominantly sandy bottom has a fairly uniform 6-foot depth. The pond is mostly still water however it does drain into the Satucket."Robbins Pond, East Bridgewater, Plymouth County, Taunton River Watershed". Located above Robbins Pond is Stump Brook, which drains through Halifax from Monponsett Pond, a 528-acre pond to form Robbins Pond which turns into the Satucket River at its outlet.

The Satucket River is very winding; it never freezes in the winter and is unmaintained, which results in many fallen trees, which clog the river and make it hard for the river to be a means of travel. It is undammed now but had one working dam in the past, provided by the Murray Carver Mill. This small dam co-existed with a water wheel and generated electricity to power the cotton gin. As a result of the unused dam 4.4 miles of the Satucket River up to Robbins Pond are unreachable by the once common river herring and other fish and the river and pond serve as suitable environments for these fish to swim up and spawn."Managing Massachusetts’ River Herring Fishery, Restoring a Historic Source of Plenty".

== Tributaries ==
The Satucket rivers tributaries Include:

• Poor Meadow Brook

• Stoney Brook

• Black Brook

== History ==
The river drainage from Monponsett to Stump Brook to the Satucket formed a very important water way link of transportation for the Wampanoags. It was part of the historic Wampanoag Canoe Passage and was utilized for years."Satucket River and Robbins Pond River Herring Habitat Assessment". By travelling up the Taunton River from Mount Hope Bay they could cross over up the Satucket to the North River watershed into Massachusetts Bay. Later in the early 1900s, the river played an important role in the economy of the town and the Carver Cotton Gin Mill.

== Wildlife ==
The Satucket River is home to many fish including:

• Largemouth Bass

• Brook Trout

• Brown Trout

• Sun Fish

• Blue Gills

• Perch

• Catfish

• Pickerel

The list is very extensive; however, these are the more common fish. On certain occasions, fish have been found to swim upstream from the ocean, and stripers have been caught out of this water along with otters and many other animals."Satucket River Fishing near East Bridgewater, Massachusetts". The Satucket River is included in the Taunton River Watershed. The Taunton and Nemasket Rivers contain 45 species of fish and support the largest alewife run in Massachusetts. "Freshwater Quality".

In the past, the river was rich with alewives that would travel upstream to spawn in the slow moving waters. Until the 1950s the Satucket had Alewives runs, however, due to certain changes in the environment over the years they are not found in the Satucket waters anymore. The Wampanoags would live off the alewives as a food source and the river had many fish weirs built to spear fish for this abundant species. Some of these weirs still exist today and are simply miniature dams made of rocks shaped in a V position that face up stream. The Wampanoags would wait on the rocks until a fish would swim through. The only opening is at the tip of the V so the fish had to swim through the weir and the Native Americans would spear them.
