= Ames Nowell State Park =

State park in Massachusetts

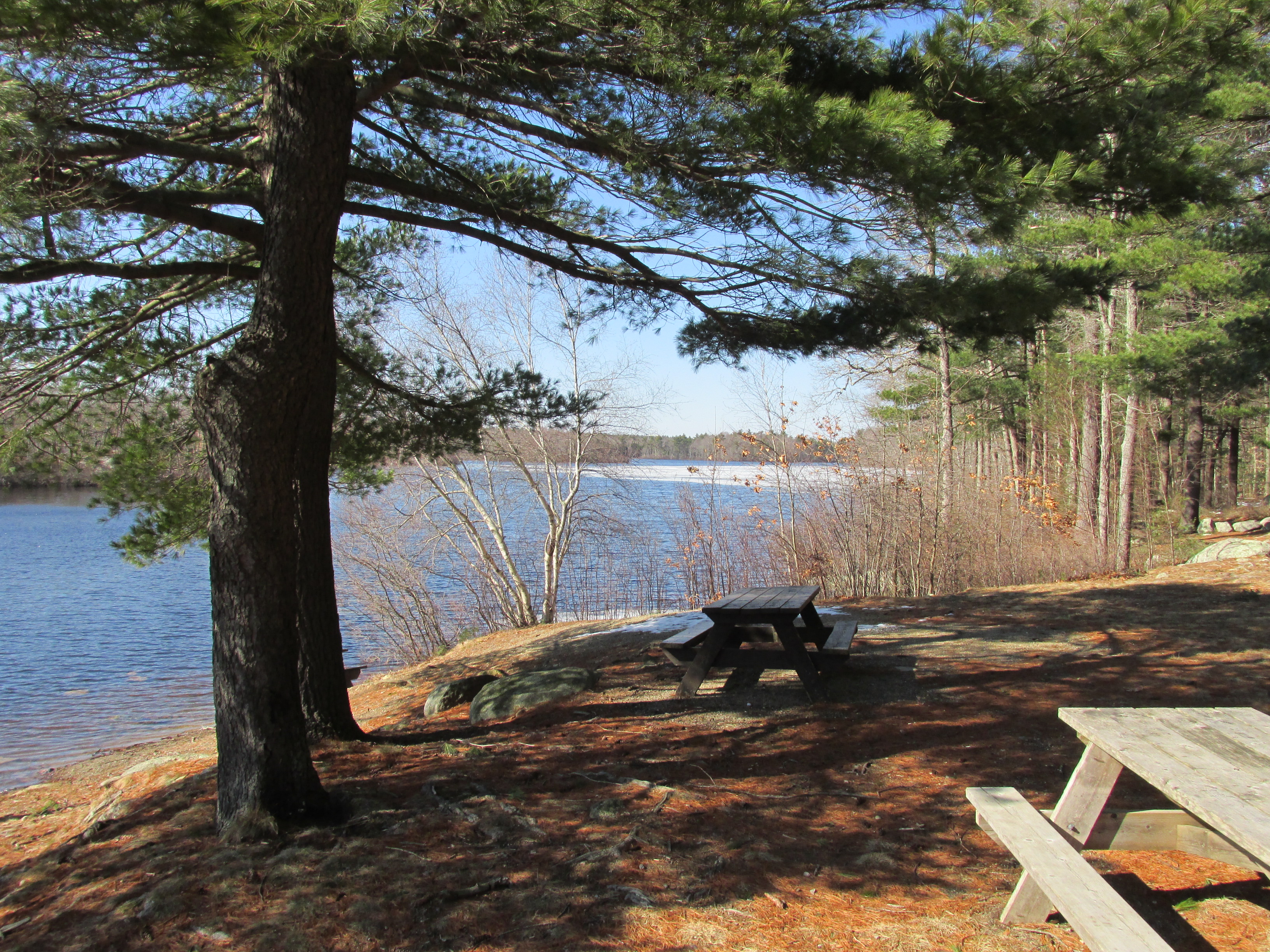
- Cleveland Pond

- Location within Massachusetts Location within the United States
- Interactive map of Ames Nowell State Park
- Location: Abington, Massachusetts, United States
- Coordinates: 42°07′14″N 70°59′18″W
- Area: 612 acres (248 ha)
- Elevation: 138 ft (42 m)
- Administrator: Massachusetts Department of Conservation and Recreation
- Website: Official website

Ames Nowell State Park is a 612-acre (248 ha) public recreation area located in Abington, Massachusetts, United States. The state park is managed by the Department of Conservation and Recreation. The park's colonial history is revealed in its miles of stone walls, two wagon bridges, and two quarries, all dating back to the 1600s and 1700s.

== Activities and amenities ==
The park's main feature is the man-made Cleveland Pond which is used for non-motorized boating and fishing. The park has boardwalks near the lake and trails for hiking, horseback riding, mountain biking, and cross-country skiing. The park also has a picnic area, playing field, and restroom facilities.
