= Statue of Massasoit (Salt Lake City) =

Statue in Salt Lake City, Utah, U.S.

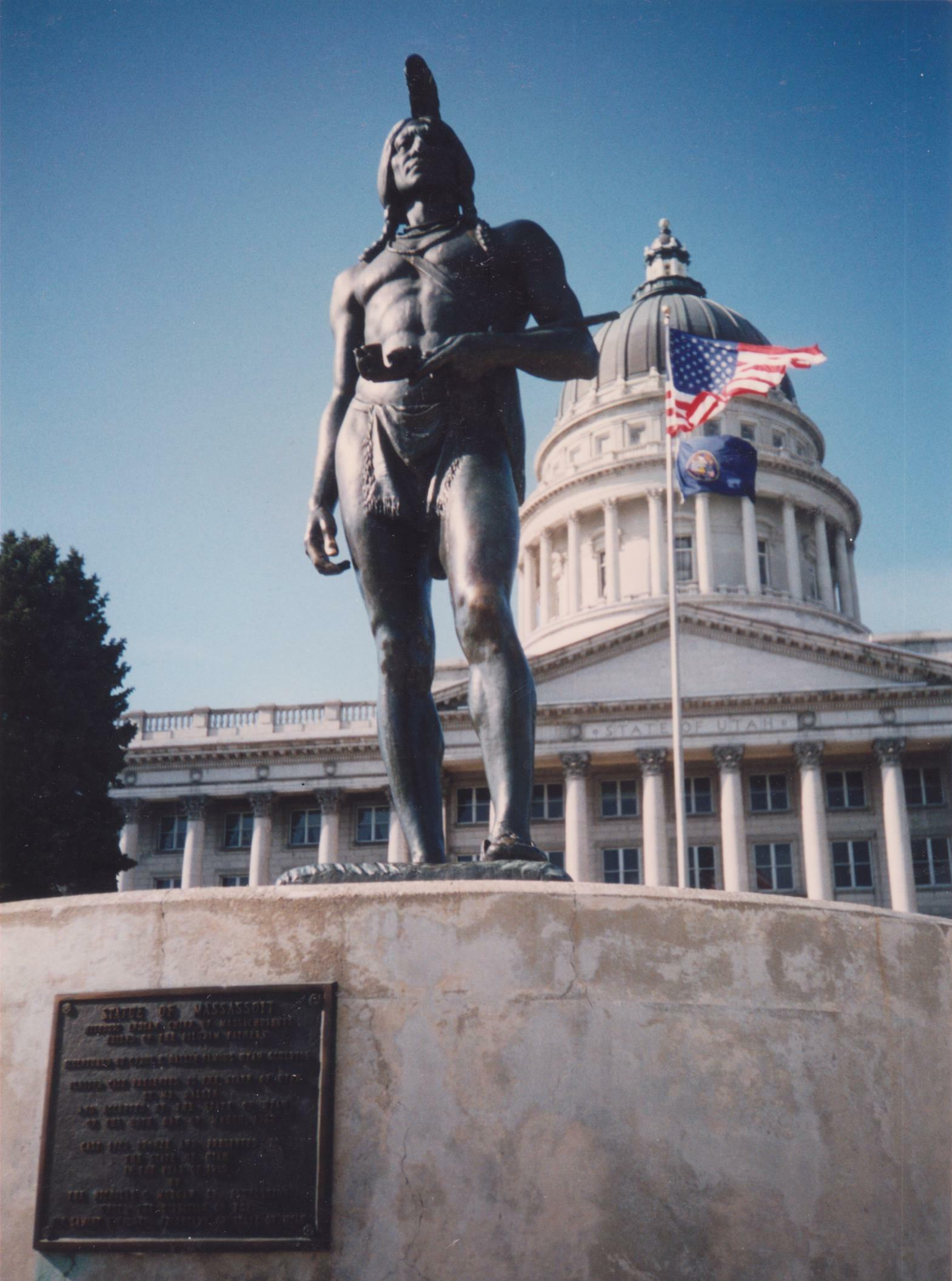
- Artist: Cyrus E. Dallin
- Subject: Massasoit
- Location: Utah State Capitol, Salt Lake City; 40°46′38.6″N 111°53′12.6″W

A statue of Massasoit by Cyrus E. Dallin is installed outside the Utah State Capitol in Salt Lake City, Utah, United States.

== See also ==
- Massasoit (statue)
