= East Bridgewater Common Historic District =

Historic district in Massachusetts, United States

- U.S. National Register of Historic Places
- U.S. Historic district
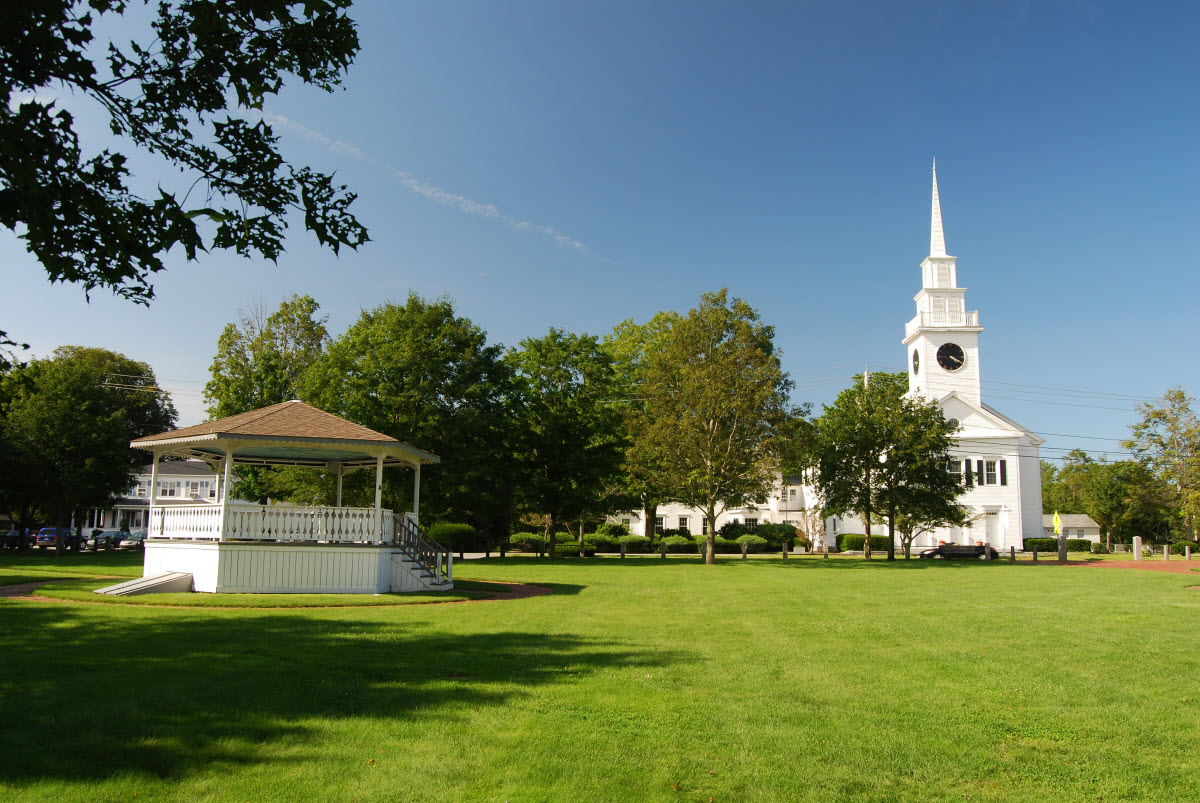

- Location within Massachusetts Location within the United States
- Location: East Bridgewater, Massachusetts
- Coordinates: 42°1′47″N 70°57′9″W
- Area: 69 acres (28 ha)
- Built: 1703
- Architectural style: Georgian, Federal
- NRHP reference No.: 99000559
- Added to NRHP: May 12, 1999

The East Bridgewater Common Historic District is a historic district encompassing the historic town center of East Bridgewater, Massachusetts. The district is centered on the town common, which was established in 1721, and radiates along Central Street away from the common. The oldest houses in the district date to 1703, and the Old Graveyard is also known to have been in use by that time. The First Parish Church, a focal point of the common area, was built in 1794 and extensively restyled in the 1850s. Town offices are now housed in the estate house of the Aaron Hobart, built in the 1850s in the Italianate style.

The district was listed on the National Register of Historic Places in 1999.

== See also ==
- National Register of Historic Places listings in Plymouth County, Massachusetts
