= Poor Meadow Brook =

Coordinates: 42°00′40″N 70°54′34″W

Location
- Country: United States

Physical characteristics
- Source
  - location: Wetland near Route 14 in Hanson
- Mouth
  - location: Satucket River
- Length: 5.8 mi (9.3 km)

Poor Meadow Brook is a 5.8-mile-long (9.3 km) stream within the Taunton River Watershed in southeastern Massachusetts. The stream runs from a wetland near County Street (the eastern crossing of Route 14) in Hanson to the confluence with the Satucket River in East Bridgewater.
