= Abington, Massachusetts =

- Town
- Aerial view (2026)

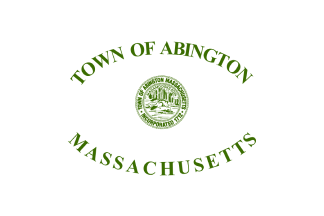
- Flag Seal

- Location in Plymouth County in Massachusetts
- Coordinates: 42°06′17″N 70°56′45″W
- Country: United States
- State: Massachusetts
- County: Plymouth
- Settled: 1668
- Incorporated: 1712
- Named after: Abingdon-on-Thames, UK

Government
  - Type: Open Town Meeting

Area
  - Total: 10.19 sq mi (26.39 km^{2})
  - Land: 9.96 sq mi (25.80 km^{2})
  - Water: 0.23 sq mi (0.59 km^{2})
- Elevation: 108 ft (33 m)

Population (2020)
  - Total: 17,062
  - Density: 1,713.1/sq mi (661.42/km^{2})
- Time zone: UTC−5 (Eastern)
  - Summer (DST): UTC−4 (Eastern)
- ZIP Code: 02351
- Area code: 339/781
- FIPS code: 25-00135
- GNIS feature ID: 0618336
- Website: www.abingtonma.gov

Abington is a town in Plymouth County, Massachusetts, United States, 20 miles (32 km) southeast of Boston. The population was 17,062 at the 2020 census.

== History ==
Before the Europeans made their claim to the area, the local Native Americans referred to the area as Manamooskeagin, meaning "great green place of shaking grass". Two streams in the area were named for the large beaver population: Schumacastacut or "upper beaver brook" and Schumacastuscacant or "lower beaver brook".

Abington was first settled by European settlers in 1668. The lands included the current towns of Bridgewater, Rockland, Whitman, and parts of Hanover. The town was officially incorporated in 1712, having been named six years earlier by Governor Joseph Dudley as a tribute to Anne Venables-Bertie, Countess of Abingdon, wife of the second Earl of Abingdon, who helped him secure the governorship of the colony from Queen Anne. The Earl of Abingdon is named from Abingdon-on-Thames in Oxfordshire (then Berkshire), UK. Indeed, the original petition from Governor Dudley ordered that "the Town be named Abingdon". A marginal note on the document gave the spelling as "Abington" as it has been known ever since.

In 1769, an iron foundry was established within the town. In 1815, Jesse Reed invented a machine that mass-produced tacks, which in turn led to the shoe industry's establishment in the town. During the nineteenth and early twentieth century, the manufacture of boots and shoes was its primary industry, with nearly half of the footwear provided for the Union Army during the Civil War being provided by Abington factories. From 1846 to 1865, Abington was a center of the abolitionist movement. In 1874 and 1875, the towns of Rockland and Whitman, respectively, separated and incorporated as towns.

In 1893, the town was the site of a riot between town constables and workers from the New York, New Haven & Hartford Railroad, over the town's rights to build a streetcar line that crossed the railroad's tracks. The town eventually built the line, and as a "peace offering", the railroad built the North Abington Depot building, which was built in the style of H. H. Richardson.

== Economy ==
Abington has evolved into a predominantly residential community with some light manufacturing.

== Geography ==
Abington is located at 42°7′10″N 70°56′52″W (42.119534, –70.947876).

According to the United States Census Bureau, the town has a total area of 9.9 square miles (25.6 km^{2}), of which 9.7 square miles (25.0 km^{2}) is land and 0.23 square miles (0.6 km^{2}), or 2.41%, is water.

Abington ranks 308th of 351 communities in the Commonwealth, and is the fourth-smallest town (behind Hull, Whitman and Rockland) in Plymouth County. Abington is bordered by Holbrook to the northwest, Weymouth to the northeast, Rockland to the east, Whitman to the south, and Brockton to the west. Abington is considered to be an inland town of the South Shore, and is located approximately 20 miles (32 km) south of Boston.

Abington has two major waterways; the Shumatuscacant River to the west provides the town's border with Brockton, and Beaver Brook runs through the eastern part of town; it was the source of much of the water power used by the shoe factories. In the northwestern corner of town lies Ames Nowell State Park, a large forested area around Cleveland Pond. Island Grove Pond was created in the 1700s, when a dam was built on the Shumatuscacant River. Much of the town's population is centered on the eastern side of town, closer to the former town geographic center. The northeast corner of town is also the site of portions of the runways of the South Weymouth Naval Air Station, which was closed in 1997 as a part of the fourth round of BRAC base closures.

=== Climate ===
The climate in this area is characterized by hot, humid summers and generally mild to cool winters. According to the Köppen climate classification system, Abington has a humid subtropical climate, abbreviated "Cfa" on climate maps.

== Demographics ==
Historical population
Year	Pop.	±%
1790	1,454	—
1850	5,266	+262.2%
1860	8,527	+61.9%
1870	9,308	+9.2%
1880	3,697	−60.3%
1890	4,260	+15.2%
1900	4,489	+5.4%
1910	5,455	+21.5%
1920	5,787	+6.1%
1930	5,872	+1.5%
1940	5,708	−2.8%
1950	7,152	+25.3%
1960	10,607	+48.3%
1970	12,334	+16.3%
1980	13,517	+9.6%
1990	13,817	+2.2%
2000	14,605	+5.7%
2010	15,985	+9.4%
2020	17,062	+6.7%
2024*	17,090	+0.2%
* = population estimate. Source: United States census records and Population Estimates Program data. Source: U.S. Decennial Census

As of the census of 2010, there were 15,985 people, 6,080 households, and 4,111 families residing in the town with 6,377 total housing units. The racial makeup of the town was 92.5% White, 2.1% Black or African American, 0.3% American Indian and Alaska Native, 1.8% Asian, 0.0% Native Hawaiian and Other Pacific Islander, 1.9% from other races, and 1.4% from two or more races. Hispanic or Latino of any race were 1.9% of the population.

There were 6,080 households, out of which 33.6% had individuals under the age of 18 living with them, 51.8% were married couples living together, 4.5% had a male householder with no wife present, 11.3% had a female householder with no husband present, and 32.4% were non-families. Of all households 25.1% consisted of someone living alone who was 65 years of age or older. The average household size was 2.61 and the average family size was 3.18.

In the town, the age distribution of the population shows 25.2% under the age of 19, 5.6% from 20 to 24, 27.7% from 25 to 44, 29.5% from 45 to 64, and 11.9% who were 65 years of age or older. The median age was 39.5 years. Males made up 48.9% of the population, while females made up 51.1%.

The median income for a household in the town, based on a 2006–2010 projection, was $74,589. In 2000, the median income for a family was $68,826. Males had a median income of $44,151 versus $30,923 for females. The per capita income for the town was $23,380. About 2.1% of families and 3.6% of the population were below the poverty line, including 4.1% of those under age 18 and 7.2% of those age 65 or over.

Statistically speaking, Abington is the 125th largest community by population in the Commonwealth, and ranks 71st by population density. Its population is lower than the population average but above the median; the population density is above the average.

== Government ==
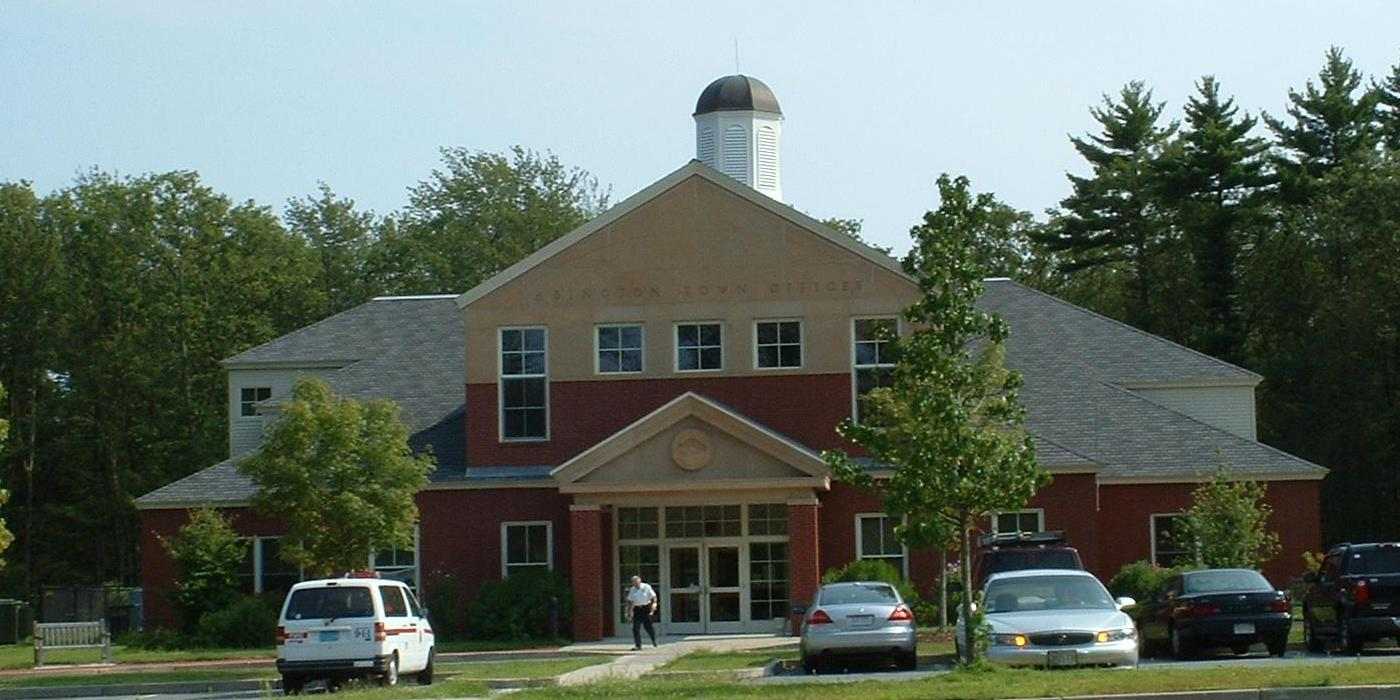
Abington Town Offices

On the national level, Abington is a part of Massachusetts's 8th congressional district, and is represented by Stephen Lynch. The state's senior (Class II) member of the United States Senate, elected in 2012, is Elizabeth Warren. The junior (Class I) senator, elected in 2013, is Ed Markey.

On the state level, Abington is represented in the Massachusetts House of Representatives as a part of the Seventh Plymouth district, which includes the towns of East Bridgewater and Whitman. The Seventh Plymouth district is represented by Republican Alyson Sullivan. The town is represented in the Massachusetts Senate by John Keenan, as a part of the Norfolk and Plymouth District, which includes Holbrook, Quincy, Rockland and part of Braintree. The town is patrolled by the First (Norwell) Barracks of Troop D of the Massachusetts State Police.

Abington is governed by the open town meeting form of government, and is led by a town manager and a board of selectmen. The town operates its own police and fire department, with firehouses located in the north and south of town along Route 18. There are two post offices in town, on Route 123 east of Route 18 and on Route 58 north of Route Route 139. The Abington Public Library, a member of the Old Colony Library Network, is located adjacent to the town hall, both of which opened in 1997 across from the high school. The town operates a park, Island Grove Park, located in the southeast of town. The current Board of Selectmen as of January 2024 includes Kevin Donovan; Chair, Timothy Chapin; Vice-Chair, Kevin DiMarzio, and Gavin Stapleton.

== Education ==
The Abington Public School District consists of one preschool, two elementary schools, one middle school, and one high school. Abington Early Education Program serves students in pre-kindergarten, Beaver Brook Elementary School serves students in kindergarten through 2nd grade, Woodsdale Elementary School serves students in 3rd grade through 4th grade, Abington Middle School serves students in 5th grade through 8th grade, and Abington High School serves students in 9th grade through 12th grade.

Outside of the Abington Public School District consists of one Catholic school. Saint Bridget School serves students in preschool through 8th grade.

== Transportation ==
There are two main north–south routes through town, Route 18 and Route 58, the latter terminating at the former just a 0.5 miles (800 m) north of the town line. Route 123 and Route 139 run east to west through the town, with Route 139 being the more northern route. There is no freeway access to town; the town is located between Route 24 and Route 3.

The town has one MBTA Commuter Rail station – Abington station on the Kingston Line. The nearest national and international air service can be found at Logan International Airport in Boston.

== Events ==
On June 10, 2012, Abington celebrated the 300th anniversary of its incorporation.

The town annually holds festivals celebrating Founders Day (the first weekend in June), Halloween, and Christmas.

The town hosts a Saint Patrick's Day parade each year throughout the town. It is one of four towns to do this including Boston, Holyoke and Scituate.

== Notable people ==
- Lucia H. Faxon Additon (1847-1919), writer, teacher, social reformer
- Sarah Louise Arnold (1859-1943), first dean of Simmons College; national president, Girl Scouts of the USA
- "Big Brother" Bob Emery (1897–1982), TV pioneer and local children's TV host
- Mike Hazen (born 1976), General Manager of the Arizona Diamondbacks
- Jim Hickey (1920–1997), pitcher for the Boston Braves during the 1942 and 1944 seasons
- Aaron Hobart (1787–1858), United States Congressman from Massachusetts
- Charles Francis Meserve (1850–1936) American academic administrator, president of Shaw University; born in Abington
- Jared C. Monti (1975–2006), Medal of Honor
- Bruce Allen Murphy, a native son who became a professor and noted judicial biographer
- Larry Murphy (born 1972), comedian and actor
- Gary Lee Sampson (1959–2021), carjacker and serial killer
- John L. Sullivan (1858–1918), bare-knuckle boxer and first modern world heavyweight champion
- Michael Sullivan (born 1954), former United States Attorney for the District of Massachusetts
- Martha Ware (1917–2009), first female selectman and first female judge of Plymouth County
