= East Bridgewater, Massachusetts =

- Town
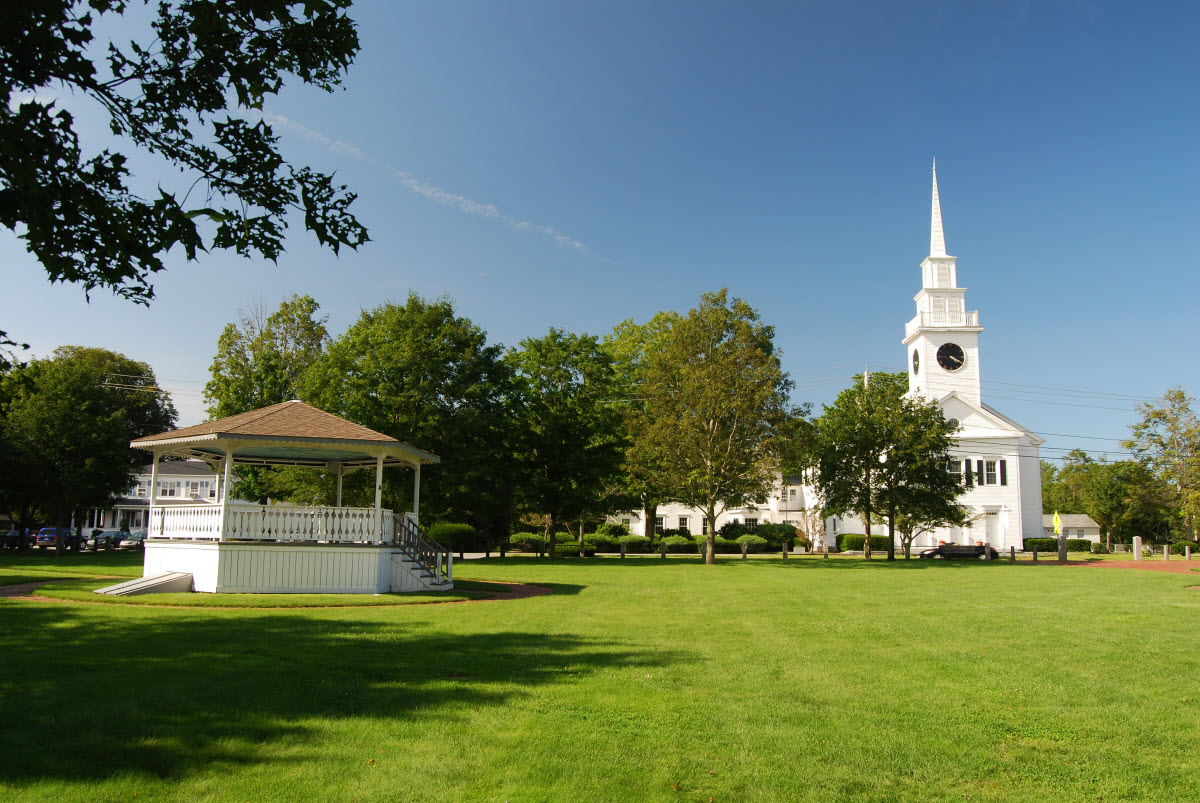
- East Bridgewater Common

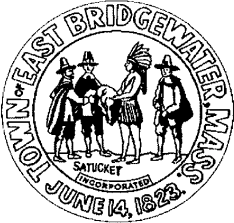
- Seal
- Nickname: The Bridge
- Location in Plymouth County in Massachusetts
- Coordinates: 42°02′00″N 70°57′35″W
- Country: United States
- State: Massachusetts
- County: Plymouth
- Settled: 1649
- Incorporated: 1823

Government
  - Type: Open town meeting with select board

Area
  - Total: 17.5 sq mi (45.3 km^{2})
  - Land: 17.3 sq mi (44.7 km^{2})
  - Water: 0.27 sq mi (0.7 km^{2})
- Elevation: 85 ft (26 m)

Population (2020)
  - Total: 14,440
  - Density: 837/sq mi (323/km^{2})
- Time zone: UTC-5 (Eastern)
  - Summer (DST): UTC-4 (Eastern)
- ZIP code: 02333
- Area code: 508 / 774
- FIPS code: 25-18455
- GNIS feature ID: 0618339
- Website: www.eastbridgewaterma.gov

East Bridgewater is an exurban town in Plymouth County, Massachusetts, United States. The population was 14,440 at the 2020 census.

== History ==
The land that is now known as East Bridgewater was first settled by Europeans in 1630 as an outgrowth of the Plymouth and Duxbury plantations. It was a part of Olde Bridgewater, as the "East Parish" founded in 1723, until it officially separated from Bridgewater and incorporated on June 14, 1823.

The town was located on the northern portion of the Taunton River, and had an economy primarily based on agriculture, though industrial development followed. Iron works in the town provided muskets and cannon for the Colonial armies during the American Revolution.

There was more residential development in the late 19th and early 20th centuries along the community's rail and trolley lines. The famous bank robber Jack Turner had a brother who owned a home in East Bridgewater during the mid-19th century. It is widely believed that Turner had left his fortune there before he was mistakenly shot by Union agents outside of Richmond, Virginia in 1864. Today, East Bridgewater is mostly known as a residential community.

== Geography ==
According to the United States Census Bureau, the town has a total area of 17.5 square miles (45 km^{2}), of which 17.2 square miles (45 km^{2}) is land and 0.3 square miles (0.78 km^{2}), or 1.49%, is water. East Bridgewater ranks 214th of 351 communities in the Commonwealth in terms of land area, and fifteenth of the twenty-seven communities of Plymouth County. The town is bordered by Whitman to the north, Hanson to the east, Halifax to the southeast, Bridgewater to the south, West Bridgewater to the west, and Brockton to the northwest, and is located twenty-seven miles southeast of Boston.

East Bridgewater is a typical community of southeastern Massachusetts, with ponds, woods and rivers around the town. The Matfield River enters the town through Bridgewater, branching off to the Satucket River and Poor Meadow Brook. Robbins Pond, the largest body of water in the town, is located in the southeastern corner of town. Sightings of ducks of massive proportions near Robbins Pond have been reported, but never confirmed. The Beaver Brook Beagle Club, a large woodlands area, is located in the northwestern corner of town.

== Demographics ==
Historical population
| Year | Pop. | ±% |
|---|---|---|
| 1850 | 2,545 | — |
| 1860 | 3,207 | +26.0% |
| 1870 | 3,017 | −5.9% |
| 1880 | 2,710 | −10.2% |
| 1890 | 2,911 | +7.4% |
| 1900 | 3,025 | +3.9% |
| 1910 | 3,363 | +11.2% |
| 1920 | 3,486 | +3.7% |
| 1930 | 3,591 | +3.0% |
| 1940 | 3,832 | +6.7% |
| 1950 | 4,412 | +15.1% |
| 1960 | 6,139 | +39.1% |
| 1970 | 8,347 | +36.0% |
| 1980 | 9,945 | +19.1% |
| 1990 | 11,104 | +11.7% |
| 2000 | 12,974 | +16.8% |
| 2010 | 13,794 | +6.3% |
| 2020 | 14,440 | +4.7% |
| 2022* | 14,338 | −0.7% |
* = population estimate. Source: United States census records and Population Estimates Program data.

As of the census of 2000, there were 12,974 people, 4,344 households, and 3,392 families residing in the town. The population density was 741.4 inhabitants per square mile (286.3/km^{2}). There were 4,427 housing units at an average density of 256.8 per square mile (99.2/km^{2}). The racial makeup of the town was 96.91% White, 0.99% African American, 0.17% Native American, 0.48% Asian, 0.03% Pacific Islander, 0.33% from other races, and 1.09% from two or more races. Hispanic or Latino of any race were 0.75% of the population.

There were 4,344 households, out of which 39.8% had children under the age of 18 living with them, 64.7% were married couples living together, 9.9% had a female householder with no husband present, and 21.9% were non-families. 17.4% of all households were made up of individuals, and 6.8% had someone living alone who was 65 years of age or older. The average household size was 2.95 and the average family size was 3.35.

In the town, the population was spread out, with 27.8% under the age of 18, 7.1% from 18 to 24, 32.2% from 25 to 44, 22.8% from 45 to 64, and 10.1% who were 65 years of age or older. The median age was 36 years. For every 100 females, there were 95.8 males. For every 100 females age 18 and over, there were 92.7 males.

The median income for a household in the town was $60,311, and the median income for a family was $67,307. Males had a median income of $47,370 versus $30,602 for females. The per capita income for the town was $23,532. About 2.4% of families and 4.1% of the population were below the poverty line, including 5.0% of those under age 18 and 6.7% of those age 65 or over. An average house in East Bridgewater has 6.2 rooms and is 36 years old with a value of $172,200. 82% of the population owns its residence, 18% rents. 1% of housing space is vacant.

Statistically, East Bridgewater ranks 144th out of 351 communities in the Commonwealth in terms of population, and 134th in terms of population density. The population lies between the average and the median, and the density is just below average. Within Plymouth County, the town ranks fifteenth of 27 towns by population, and twelfth by population density.

== Government and politics ==
On the national level, East Bridgewater is a part of Massachusetts's 8th congressional district, and has been represented since 2001 by Stephen Lynch. The state's senior (Class II) member of the United States Senate, elected in 2012, is Elizabeth Warren. The junior (Class I) senator, elected in 2013, is Edward Markey.

On the state level, precincts 1, 2 and 3 of East Bridgewater are represented by Alyson Sullivan-Almeida in the Massachusetts House of Representatives as a part of the 7th Plymouth district, which also includes the towns of Abington and Whitman. Precinct 4 of East Bridgewater, meanwhile, is represented by Bridget Plouffe as part of the 9th Plymouth district, which includes the city of Brockton and the town of West Bridgewater. The town is represented in the Massachusetts Senate as a part of two districts: by Michael Brady in the Second Plymouth and Bristol district, which includes Brockton, Halifax, Hanover, Hanson, Whitman and portions of Easton; and by Walter F. Timilty in the Norfolk, Bristol and Plymouth district, which includes all or parts of Avon, Braintree, Canton, Easton, Milton, Randolph, Sharon, Stoughton, and West Bridgewater. The town is patrolled by the Fourth (Middleborough) Barracks of Troop D of the Massachusetts State Police.

East Bridgewater is governed on the local level by the open town meeting form of government, led by its town administrator, Charlie Seelig, and a select board. The town operates its own police and fire departments; the police department is headquartered adjacent to the town hall, at the center of town, and the fire headquarters are just south on Route 18. The fire department has an ambulance service which brings patients to nearby Signature Healthcare Brockton Hospital, Steward Good Samaritan Medical Center, and South Shore Hospital. The town's post office is located west of the town center, and handles the entire town. East Bridgewater Public Library is located in a historic building along Route 18 at the center of town; it is a part of the SAILS Library Network. The town also operates two parks near the town center and has its own department of public works.

United States presidential election results for East Bridgewater, Massachusetts
| Year | Republican | | Democratic | | Third party(ies) | |
| Year | No. | % | No. | % | No. | % |
|---|---|---|---|---|---|---|
| 2020 | 4,311 | 51.28% | 4,096 | 48.72% | 0 | 0.00% |
| 2016 | 4,064 | 56.28% | 3,157 | 43.72% | 0 | 0.00% |
| 2012 | 3,867 | 53.66% | 3,340 | 46.34% | 0 | 0.00% |
| 2008 | 3,702 | 52.71% | 3,321 | 47.29% | 0 | 0.00% |
| 2004 | 3,393 | 52.13% | 3,116 | 47.87% | 0 | 0.00% |
| 2000 | 3,024 | 55.62% | 2,413 | 44.38% | 0 | 0.00% |

== Education ==
East Bridgewater has its own school system for the town's approximately 2,500 students. The Central School is just west of the town hall at the town center and serves students from pre-kindergarten through second grade. The Gordon W. Mitchell School, located to the east of the town center, serves third through sixth grade students. East Bridgewater High School is located just east of the town hall, and serves seventh through twelfth grade students.

In addition to public schools, high school students may attend Southeastern Regional Vocational Technical High School in South Easton free of charge. There are also private schools in the neighboring communities to the north and south, and the town is the site of the Metro South Academy School, a special needs middle and high school. The town is located near both Massasoit Community College in Brockton, Stonehill College in Easton, and Bridgewater State University.

== Religion ==
The Catholic Church of Saint John the Evangelist is located on Central Street and works in collaboration with St Ann's church in West Bridgewater.

== Transportation ==
Route 18 is the major north–south route through town, passing through the town center. Route 106 also passes from east to west through the southern part of town, and Route 104 clips the southern corner of the town before ending at Route 106 near the Halifax line. Route 27 also clips the northeastern corner of town, and Route 14 passes through this part of town as well. There is no freeway in the town; Route 24 passes through the neighboring towns to the west.

A short stretch of the Fall River/New Bedford Line of the MBTA Commuter Rail passes through the western section of town, with the nearest stops in neighboring Bridgewater and Brockton, as well as stops along the Kingston-Route 3 Line in neighboring Hanson and Halifax, all providing service to Boston. While there is no airport in town, the nearest national air service is Logan International Airport in Boston.

== Notable people ==
- John Cariani, actor
- Gordon M. Craig, veteran of the Korean War and Medal of Honor recipient
- Manny Delcarmen, former Boston Red Sox pitcher
- Joe Lauzon, UFC fighter
- Dan Lauzon, MMA fighter, brother of Joe Lauzon
- Dana LeVangie, former Boston Red Sox pitching coach
- Francis Davis Millet, painter
- Jim Riley, bassist for The Ghost Inside
- Tom Everett Scott, actor
- Ezekiel Whitman, former representative from Maine
- Monique Jones, Miss Massachusetts Teen USA 2000, Mrs. Massachusetts 2014

== See also ==
- East Bridgewater Common Historic District
- Sachem Rock Farm
