= Taunton River watershed =

Drainage basin in Massachusetts, US

Coordinates: 42°N 71°W

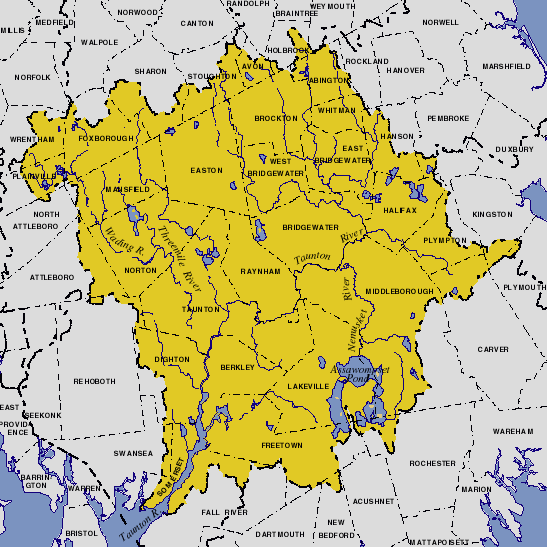
An USGS map of the Taunton River Watershed

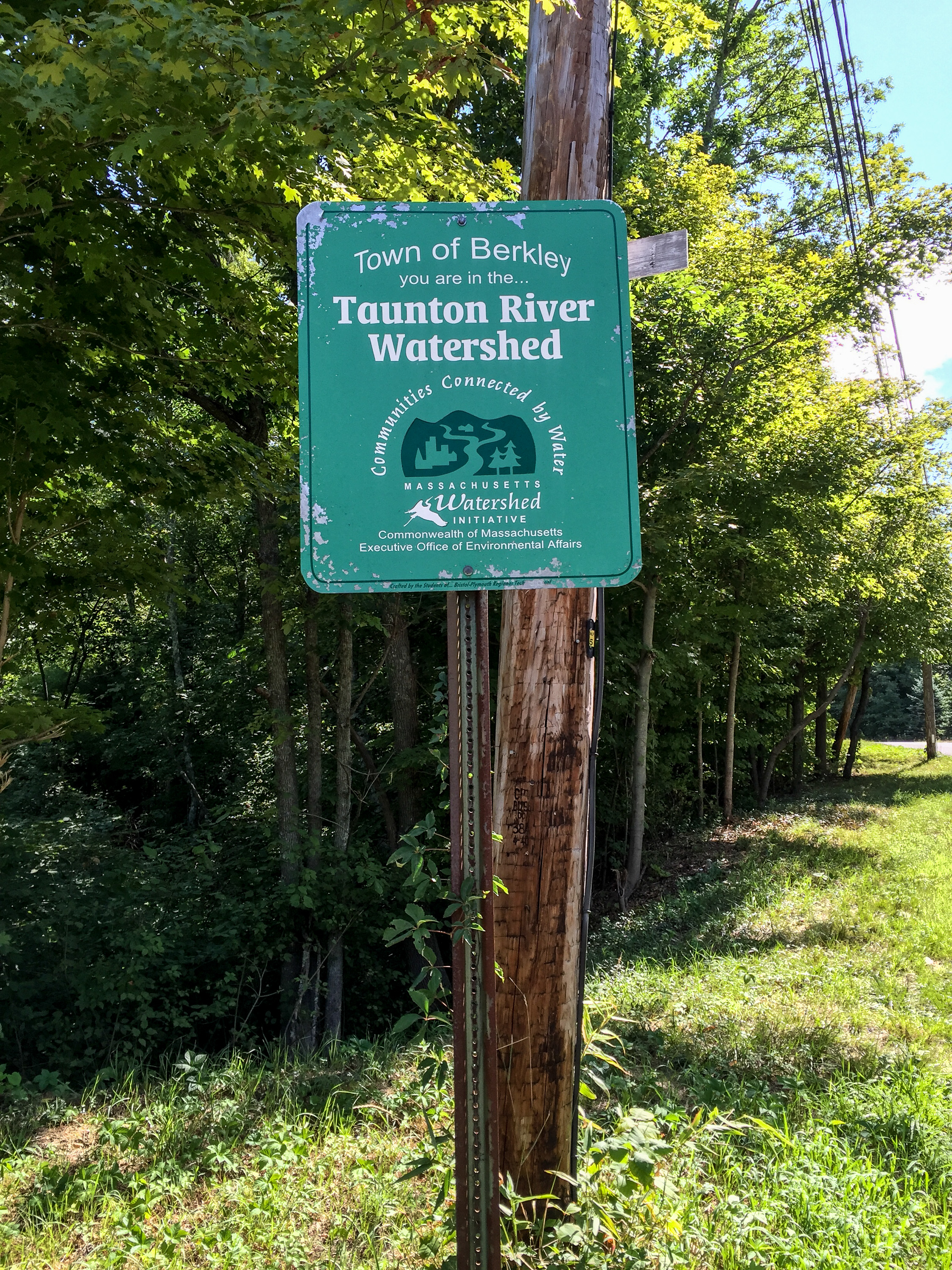
A sign in Berkley, MA indicates that "You are in the Taunton River Watershed"

The Taunton River watershed or Taunton River basin is made up of 562 square miles (1,500 km^{2}) of rivers, lakes, ponds, streams, and wetlands in southeastern Massachusetts, US. It is the second largest watershed in the state. Also, it is a significant part of a much larger multi-state watershed, the Narragansett Bay watershed.

The Taunton River watershed is mostly situated in Bristol County and western Plymouth County, while some portions of it extends into parts of southern Norfolk County.

The Taunton River watershed includes:

- 7 species of freshwater mussels
- 27 different habitat types
- 29 species of native fish
- 114 species of birds.
- 173 square miles (450 km^{2}) of canoeable river
- 221 lakes and ponds
- Hockomock Swamp of 16,800 acres (6,800 ha)

== Environmental advocacy ==
This is an incomplete list of environmental groups and organizations that advocate protecting, by legislation and grants, the Taunton River Watershed:

- Sheehan Family Foundation Grant
- Taunton River Watershed Alliance
- Taunton River Wild and Scenic Rivers Study

== See also ==
- List of Massachusetts rivers
- Three Mile River
