= Hanson station =

Railway station in Hanson, Massachusetts

Hanson
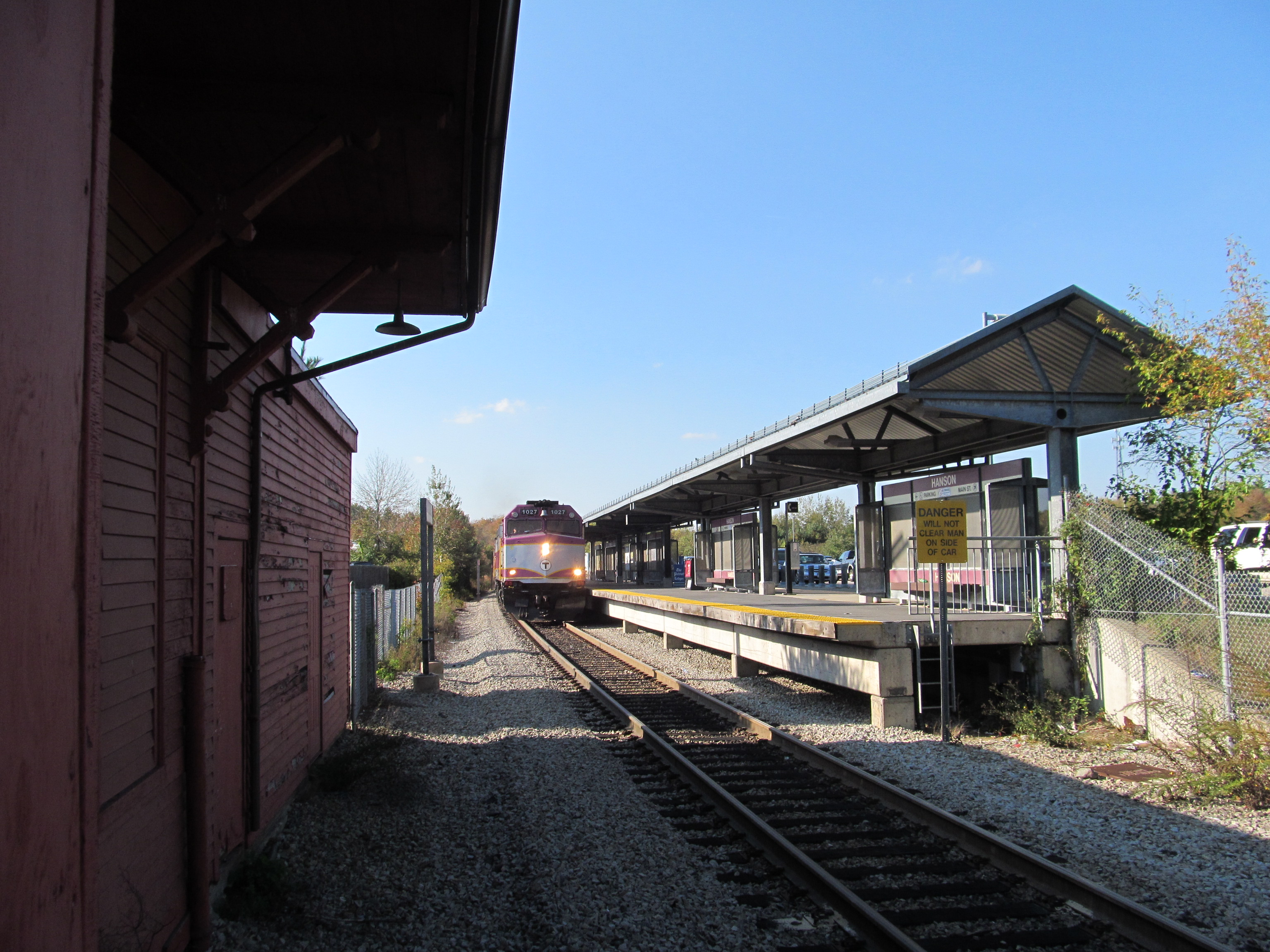
- A train at Hanson station in 2012. The former South Hanson station building is at left.

General information
- Location: 1070 Main Street (Route 27); Hanson, Massachusetts
- Coordinates: 42.0438°N 70.8820°W
- Line: Plymouth Branch
- Platforms: 1 side platform
- Tracks: 1

Construction
- Parking: 428 spaces ($4.00 fee)
- Cycle facilities: 8 spaces
- Accessible: Yes

Other information
- Fare zone: 6

History
- Opened: November 1845; September 29, 1997
- Closed: June 30, 1959
- Rebuilt: Late 1845, 1878
- Former names: South Hanson (1878–1959)

Passengers
- 2024: 182 daily boardings

Services
Preceding station	MBTA	Following station
Whitman toward South Station	Kingston Line	Halifax toward Kingston
Former services
Preceding station	New York, New Haven and Hartford Railroad	Following station
North Hanson toward Boston	Boston–Plymouth	Burrage toward Plymouth
Location

Hanson station is an MBTA Commuter Rail station in Hanson, Massachusetts, served by the Kingston Line. It is located off Main Street (Massachusetts Route 27) in the South Hanson village. It has one full-length high-level platform serving the line's single track and is fully accessible.

== History ==
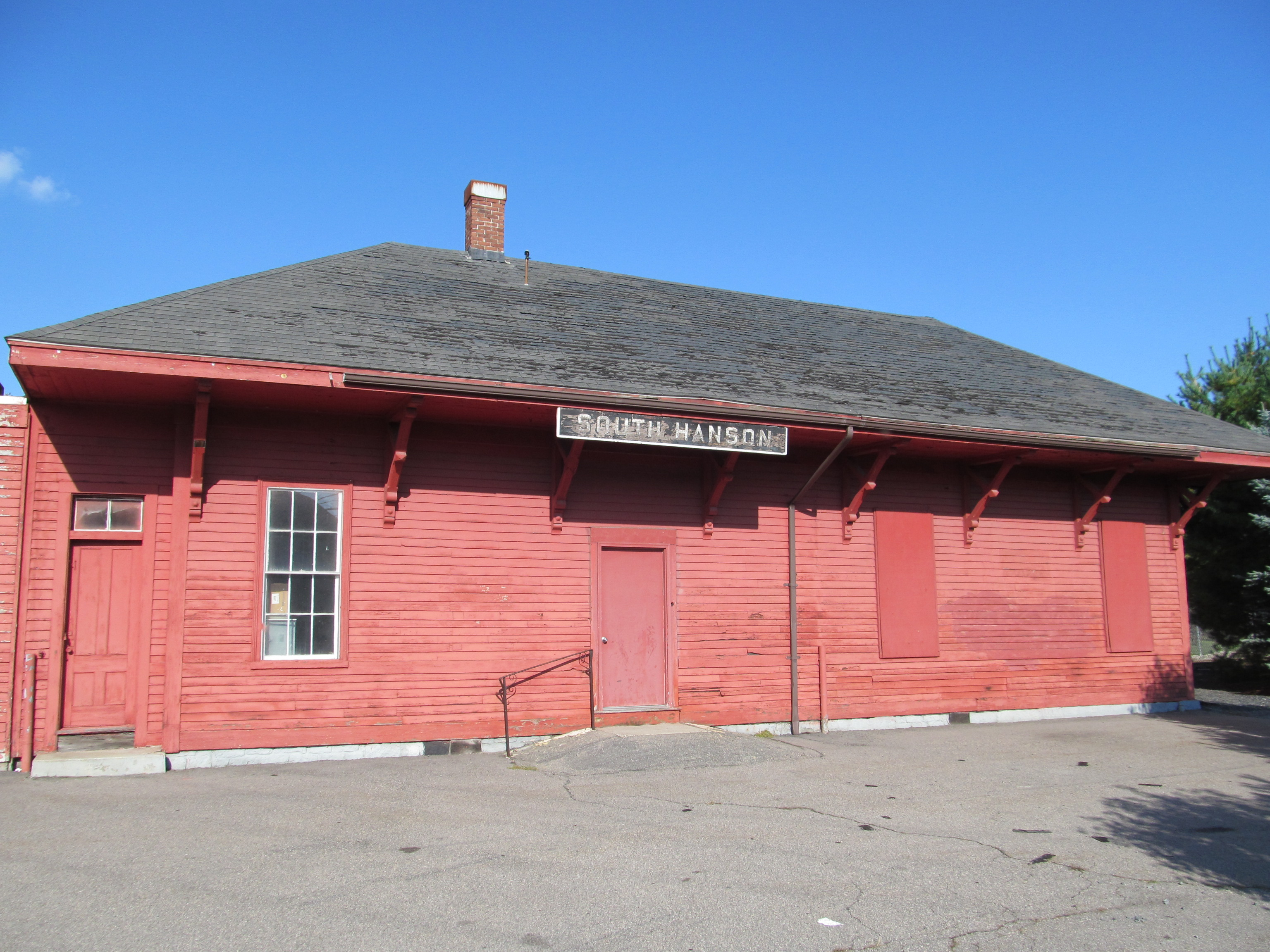
The former station building, built in 1878

The Old Colony Railroad opened through South Hanson in November 1845, with Hanson station located at Main Street. The station burned two weeks later, and an exact replica was constructed.

The station was renamed South Hanson on June 24, 1878. A new wooden station building was constructed that year; it was split in half in 1886 and a new middle section added. The original station was converted to a freight house and may have survived as late as the 1990s.

The New Haven Railroad ended its remaining Old Colony Division service, including commuter service to South Hanson, on June 30, 1959. The former station building remains intact, though unused.

On September 29, 1997, the MBTA restored commuter rail service on the Plymouth/Kingston Line and Middleborough/Lakeville Line. Hanson station was opened at the former South Hanson station site.
