= Whitman station =

Railway station in Whitman, Massachusetts

Whitman
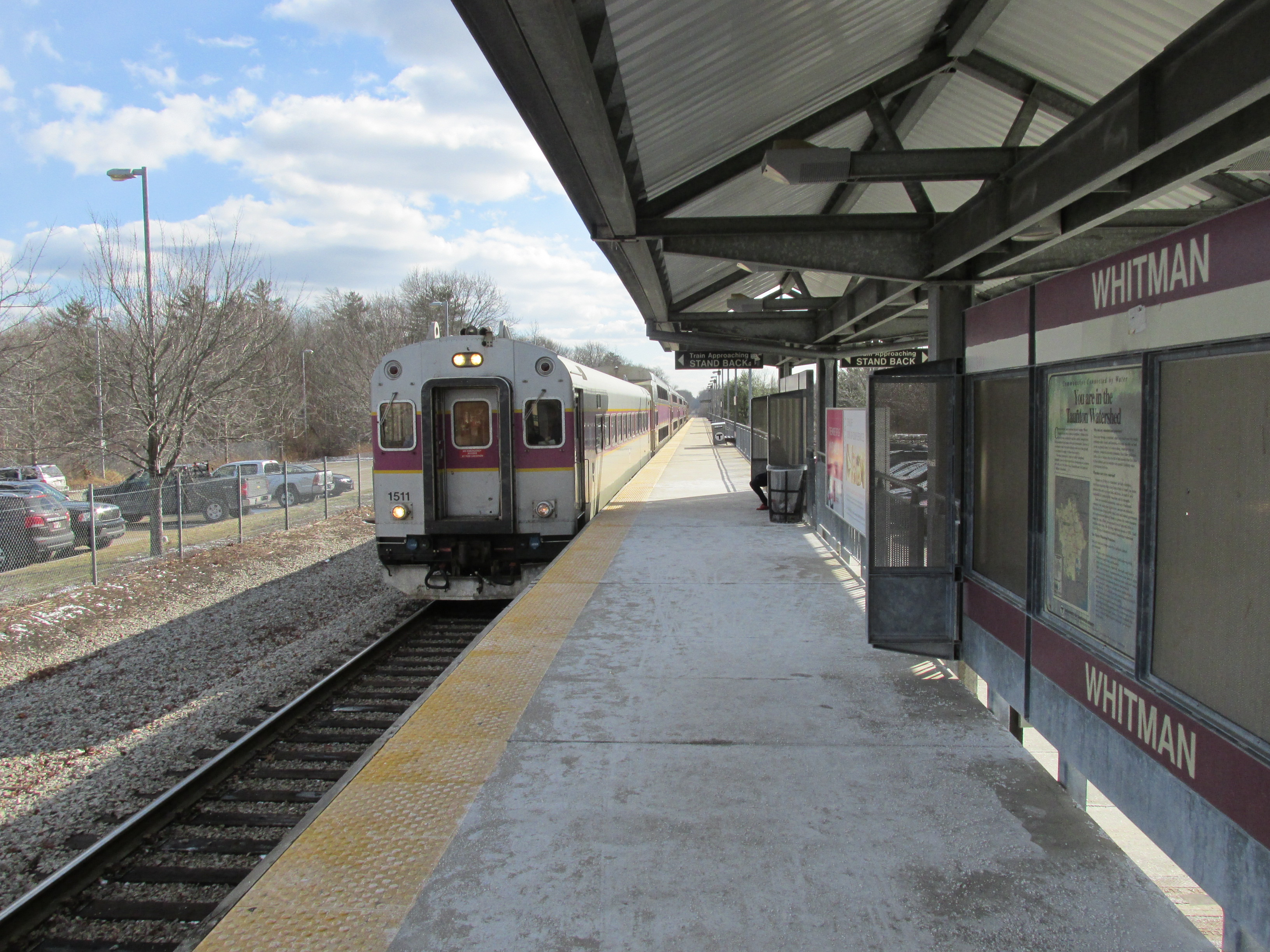
- An inbound train at Whitman station in 2013

General information
- Location: 383 South Avenue (Route 27); Whitman, Massachusetts
- Coordinates: 42.0826°N 70.9234°W
- Line: Plymouth Branch
- Platforms: 1 side platform
- Tracks: 1

Construction
- Parking: 208 spaces
- Cycle facilities: 8 spaces
- Accessible: Yes

Other information
- Fare zone: 5

History
- Opened: c. 1845; September 29, 1997
- Closed: June 30, 1959
- Rebuilt: 1881
- Former names: South Abington (until 1886)

Passengers
- 2024: 239 daily boardings

Services
Preceding station	MBTA	Following station
Abington toward South Station	Kingston Line	Hanson toward Kingston
Former services
Preceding station	New York, New Haven and Hartford Railroad	Following station
Abington toward Boston	Boston–Plymouth	North Hanson toward Plymouth
Location

Whitman station is an MBTA Commuter Rail station in Whitman, Massachusetts. It serves the Plymouth/Kingston Line. It is located off South Avenue (Route 27). Parking is available on the south side of South Avenue on both sides of the tracks. The station opened along with the rest of the line on September 26, 1997.

== History ==
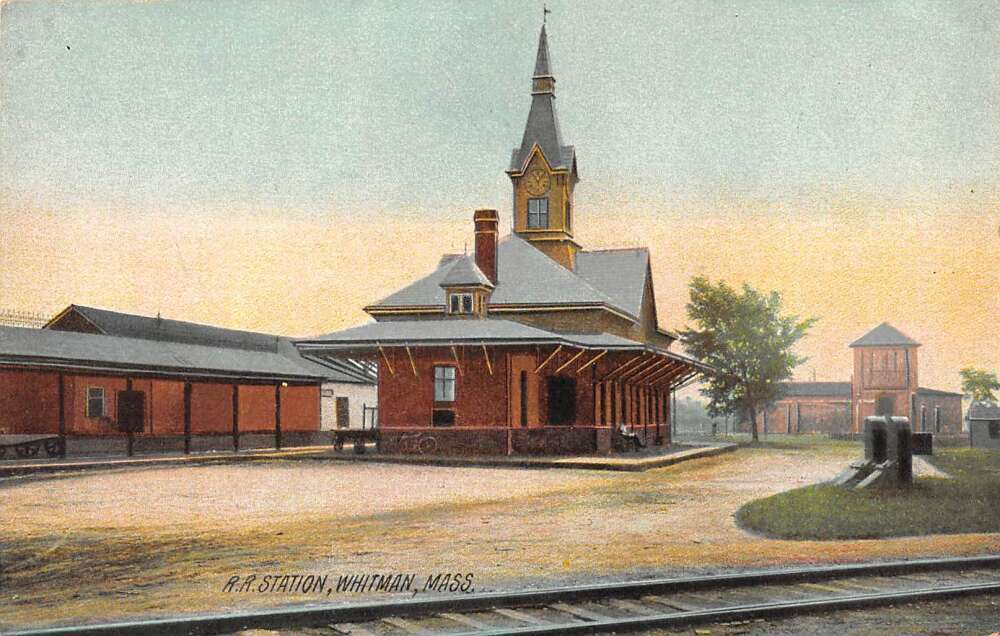
Early-20th-century postcard of Whitman station

The Old Colony Railroad opened through Abington in November 1845. South Abington station opened with the line or shortly thereafter. The Old Colony opened its Bridgewater Branch from South Abington to Bridgewater in 1847. Mergers resulted in changes to the railroad's name in 1854 and 1863; it became simply "Old Colony Railroad" again in 1872.

In 1881–82, the Old Colony built a brick passenger station and an engine house at South Abington. A freight yard and buildings were constructed, and a new wye with the Bridgewater Branch was added south of the station. The station was renamed Whitman on May 10, 1886, following the town's name change a week earlier. The Old Colony was acquired by the New York, New Haven and Hartford Railroad in 1893.

Passenger service on the Bridgewater Branch ended in 1925. The portion from Whitman to East Bridgewater was abandoned in 1937. The four-stall engine house was destroyed by the 1938 New England hurricane. All Old Colony Division passenger service ended on June 30, 1959, though freight service continued to use the line. The former station building was destroyed by fire on November 23, 1972.

The Massachusetts Bay Transportation Authority (MBTA) purchased many of the former New Haven Railroad lines, including the Old Colony mainline (Plymouth Secondary) between Braintree and Plymouth, from Penn Central in 1973. By 1985, the MBTA also owned the former platform area at Whitman. The engine house foundations were uncovered in 1990 during an archeological survey prior to the restoration of service on the line. The site was turned into a park at a cost of $100,000. The new station opened along with the rest of the Old Colony Lines on September 26, 1997. Whitman Roundhouse Park opened in October 1999.
