= Halifax station (MBTA) =

Rail station in Halifax, Massachusetts, US

Halifax
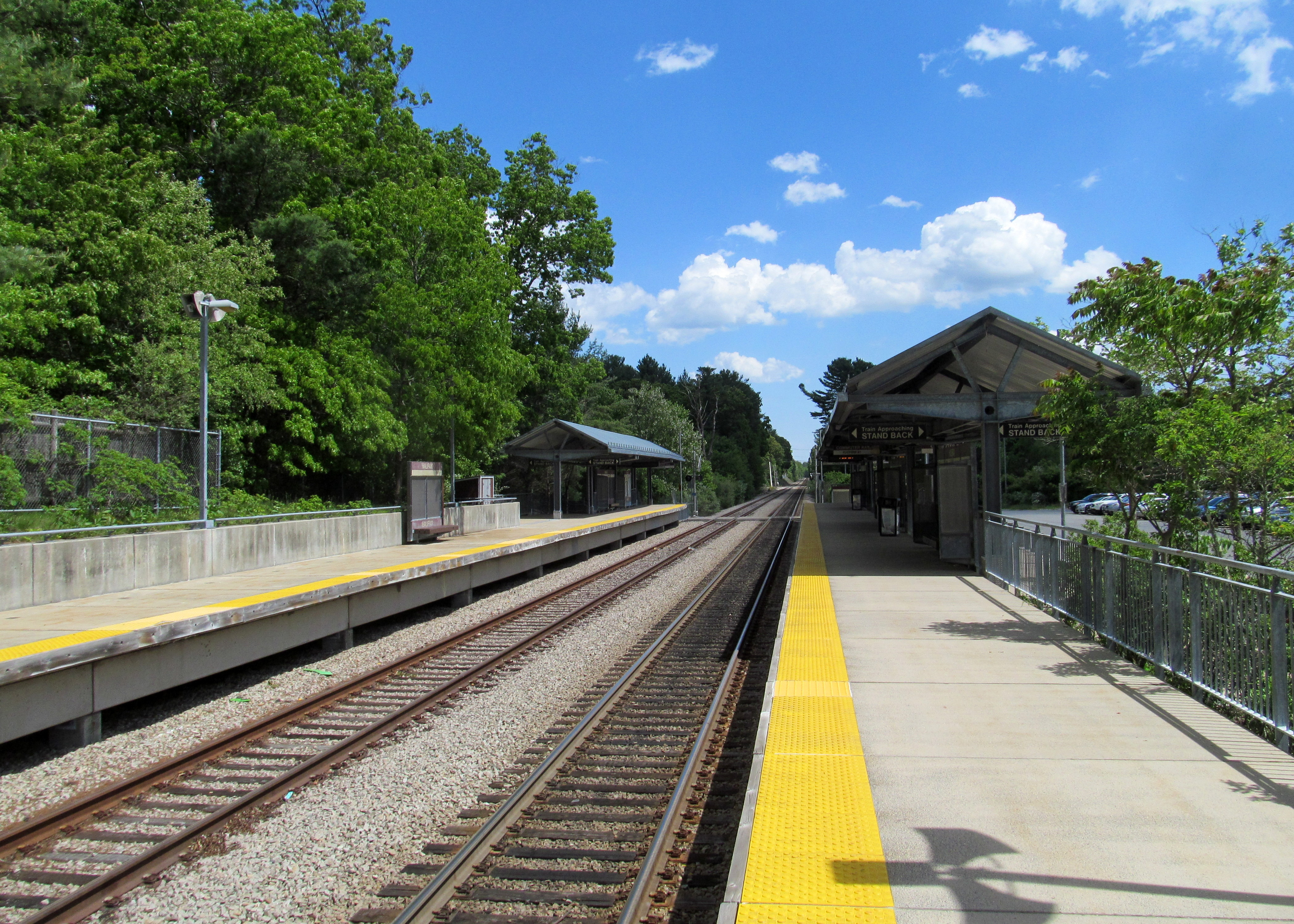
- Halifax station in June 2017

General information
- Location: 6 Garden Road; Halifax, Massachusetts
- Coordinates: 42.0146°N 70.8241°W
- Line: Plymouth Branch
- Platforms: 2 side platforms
- Tracks: 2

Construction
- Parking: 412 spaces ($2.00 fee)
- Cycle facilities: 8 spaces
- Accessible: Yes

Other information
- Fare zone: 7

History
- Opened: September 29, 1997
- Closed: July 17, 1938 (former station)

Passengers
- 2024: 146 daily boardings

Services
Preceding station	MBTA	Following station
Hanson toward South Station	Kingston Line	Kingston Terminus
Hanson toward South Station	Kingston Line	Plymouth limited service (suspended) Terminus
Former services
Preceding station	New York, New Haven and Hartford Railroad	Following station
Monponsett toward Boston	Boston–Plymouth	Plympton toward Plymouth
Location

Halifax station is an MBTA Commuter Rail station in Halifax, Massachusetts, served by the Kingston Line. It is located off Holmes Street (Massachusetts Route 36) in northeastern Halifax. Unlike the other stations on the line, Halifax station has two side platforms serving two tracks.

== History ==
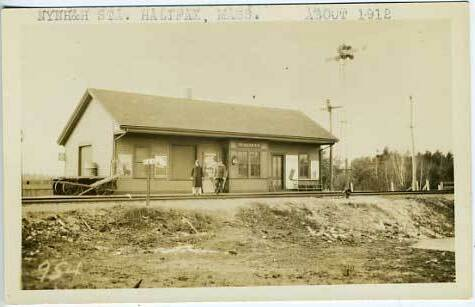
Halifax station around 1912

The New Haven Railroad's Halifax station was located on the opposite side of Holmes Street. It closed on July 17, 1938, as part of the 88 stations case.

Service was restored on the Plymouth/Kingston Line on September 29, 1997. By 1999, the station was the busiest on the line. The original 281-space lot was expanded by 120–150 spaces around 2000.
