= Kingston Line =

Commuter rail line in Massachusetts, US

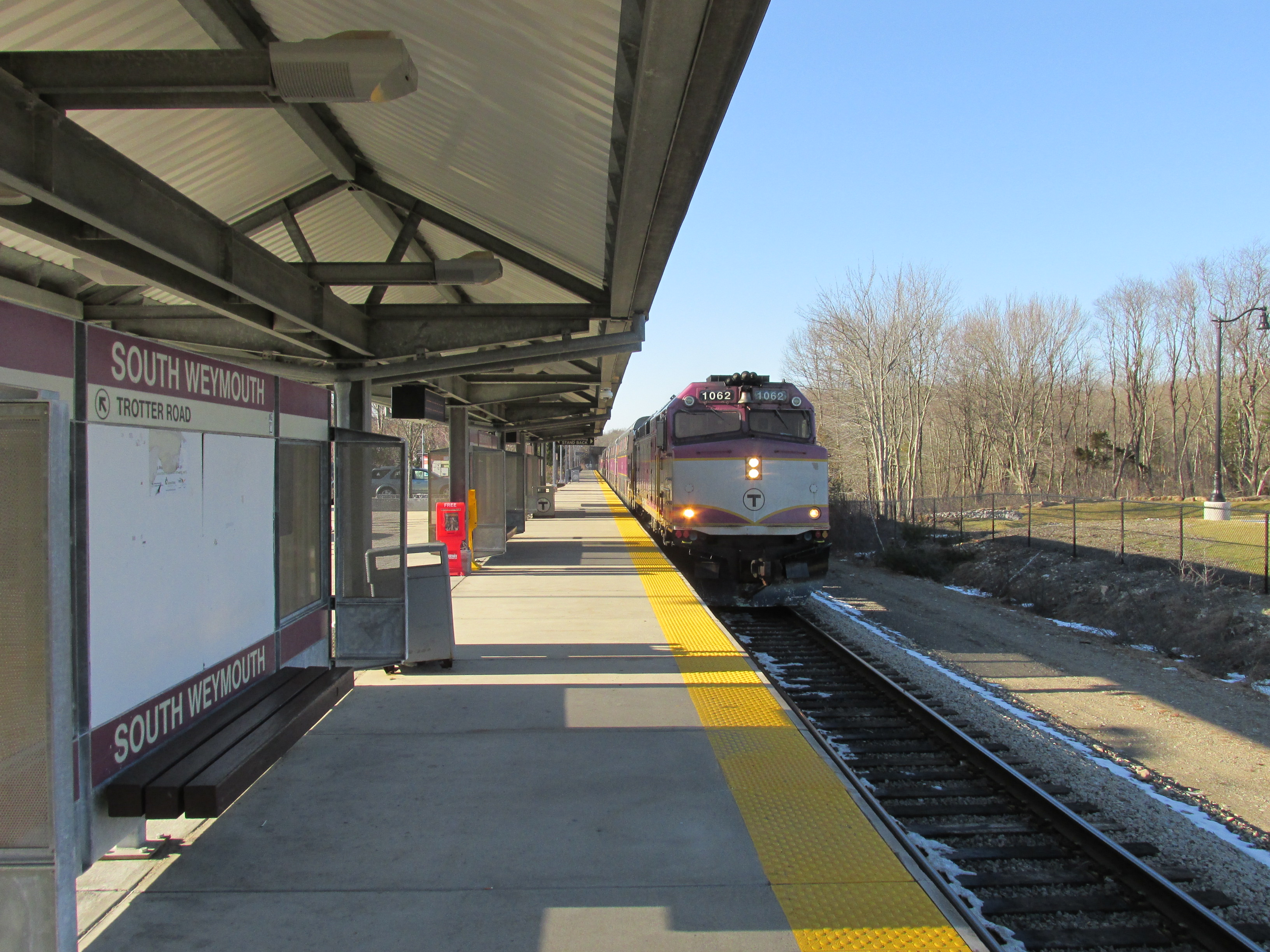
- An outbound train at South Weymouth station in 2013

Overview
- Owner: Massachusetts Bay Transportation Authority
- Locale: Southeastern Massachusetts
- Termini: South Station; Kingston
- Stations: 10 current; 1 indefinitely closed

Service
- Type: Commuter rail
- System: MBTA Commuter Rail
- Train numbers: 8301-8326 (weekdays); 8801-8818 (weekends)
- Operator: Keolis North America
- Daily ridership: 5,310 (2024)

History
- Opened: September 29, 1997

Technical
- Line length: 35.1 miles (56.5 km)
- Num of tracks: 1–2
- Track gauge: 4 ft 8 1/2 in (1,435 mm)

The Kingston Line is a commuter rail line of the MBTA Commuter Rail system in southeastern Massachusetts, United States. It runs 35.1 miles (56.5 km) southeast from Boston to Kingston with eight intermediate stops. Plymouth station, which served as a second outer terminal, has been indefinitely closed since 2021. The line had 4,171 boardings per weekday in October 2022.

The line originated as the Old Colony Railroad, which opened between Boston and Plymouth in 1845. It became the primary rail route between Boston and southeastern Massachusetts, serving a number of branches that the Old Colony built and acquired. The Old Colony merged in 1854 to become the Old Colony and Fall River Railroad, in 1863 to become the Old Colony and Newport Railway, and in 1872 to become the Old Colony Railroad. It was leased by the New York, New Haven and Hartford Railroad in 1893.

Commuter service peaked in the early 20th century and began to decline in the 1910s. After two decades of attempts to end Old Colony Division service, the New Haven terminated it in 1959. Planning for the Massachusetts Bay Transportation Authority to restore service to Plymouth began in the 1980s. Construction began in 1993 and service began in 1997 as the Plymouth/Kingston Line. (Note: The MBTA interchangeably used "Plymouth/Kingston Line" and "Kingston/Plymouth Line".) It became the Kingston Line after the closure of Plymouth station.

== Operations ==
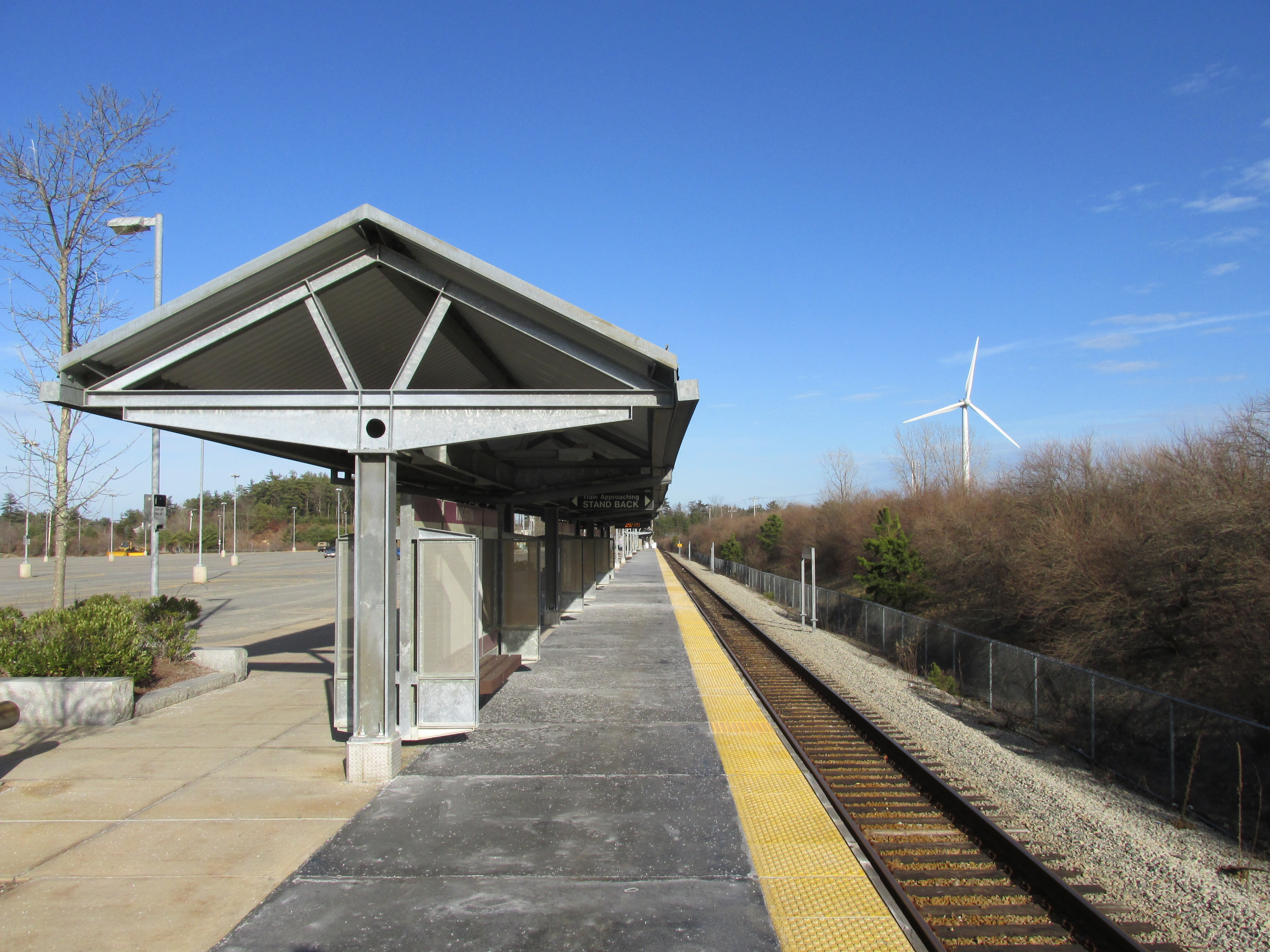
Kingston station is the line's southern terminus.

The northern section of the line follows the Middleborough Main Line south through Boston, Quincy, and Braintree. That section is shared with the Fall River/New Bedford Line and Greenbush Line. At Braintree, the line switches to the Plymouth Branch, which continues southeast through Weymouth, Abington, Whitman, Hanson, Halifax, and Kingston. Intermediate stations are served at JFK/UMass, Quincy Center, Braintree, South Weymouth, Abington, Whitman, and Halifax. In Kingston, the short Kingston Branch splits from the Plymouth Branch and runs south to Kingston station and the Kingston Layover. The Plymouth Branch continues southeast from the split to the currently-closed Plymouth station in northern Plymouth. The Plymouth Branch is single track with passing sidings, while the Kingston Branch is mostly double-tracked. The portion of the Middleborough Main Line used by the Kingston Line has a mixture of single and double track.

Like the rest of the MBTA Commuter Rail system, the Kingston Line operates using push-pull trains with diesel locomotives. Maximum speeds are between 60–80 miles per hour (97–129 km/h) south of Braintree and 40–60 miles per hour (64–97 km/h) to the north. As of October 2025, the line has 13 inbound and 12 outbound trips on weekdays and nine round trips on weekdays. Most trips operate the full length of the line, with running times typically around 60 minutes. The last trips in each direction, plus the first weekday inbound trip, only operate between Braintree and Kingston. Trains always serve all stops except for JFK/UMass, which is only served at weekday peak hours in the peak direction. All stations are accessible with full-length high-level platforms.

== History ==
=== Previous service ===
==== Old Colony Railroad ====
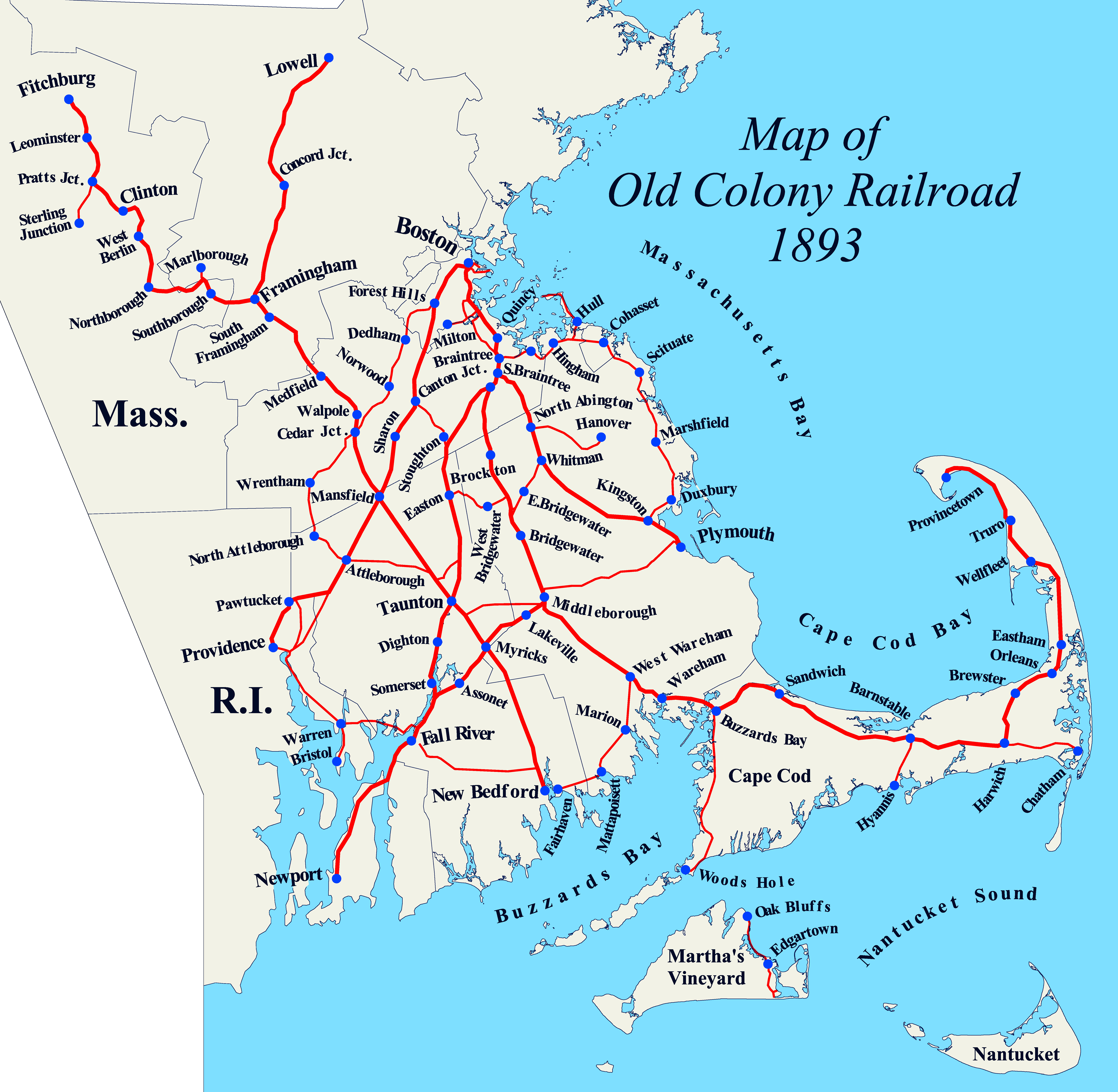
Map of the Old Colony Railroad in 1893

The Old Colony Railroad opened between South Boston and Plymouth on November 10, 1845. A short extension into Boston proper opened in March 1846. As the only rail line east of the Blue Hills, the Old Colony became the primary rail route between Boston and southeastern Massachusetts. The Old Colony built or acquired a number of other lines, all of which used the Old Colony mainline to access Boston. The Fall River Railroad (1846), Milton Branch (1847), South Shore Line (1849), Dighton and Somerset Railroad (1866), and Granite Branch (1871) all joined the mainline between South Braintree and Boston. The Hanover Branch (1868) joined at North Abington, while the Bridgewater Branch (1847) joined at Whitman.

The mainline was double-tracked between Boston and South Braintree in 1848 to serve the growing traffic. Schedules were suitable for commuting from as far south as South Braintree by 1847; commuter service to Plymouth was intermittent until around 1860 and consistent thereafter. Some short turn trains terminated at Whitman after 1860. The Old Colony merged in 1854 to become the Old Colony and Fall River Railroad, in 1863 to become the Old Colony and Newport Railway, and in 1872 to become the Old Colony Railroad. The Plymouth and Vineyard Sound Railroad, an extension beyond Plymouth to Cape Cod, was proposed in the 1860s, but only the Cape Cod section between Buzzards Bay and Woods Hole was built.

Major wrecks took place on the mainline at Wollaston in 1878 and at Quincy in 1890. To reduce congestion on the busy mainline and make trains faster, the Old Colony used a practice called flying switches. The rear coaches of moving trains were disconnected at speed near junctions and brought to a halt to serve as branchline trains, while the rest of the train continued without stopping. The practice was ended after an 1883 incident at Neponset. After Old Colony acquired the Boston and Providence Railroad in 1888, some trains were routed via the Stoughton Branch to reduce mainline congestion.

==== New Haven Railroad ====
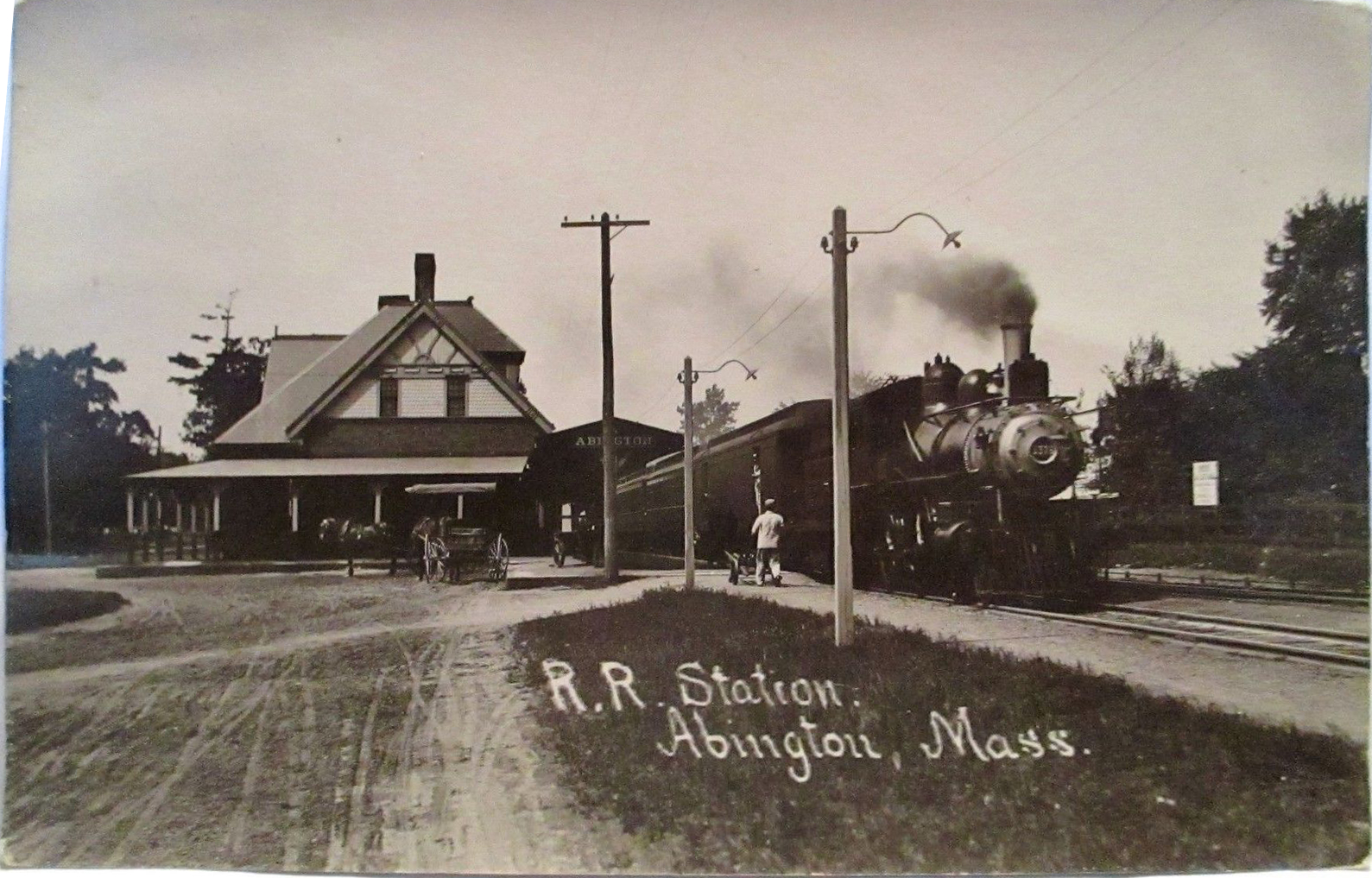
Abington station around 1910

The New York, New Haven and Hartford Railroad leased the Old Colony in 1893. Passenger service on the Old Colony Division was at its peak from around 1898 to 1914. In 1898, daily inbound service to Boston included seven trains from Plymouth and five from Whitman plus some through trains from the Bridgewater and Hanover branches. Six South Shore trains used the line between Plymouth and Kingston. The mainline was relocated between South Boston and Crescent Avenue in 1897–1898 to eliminate grade crossings in preparation for the 1899 opening of South Station. The line was quadruple-tracked from South Boston to Savin Hill in 1901–02, to Neponset in 1911–12, and to Atlantic in 1913, including grade crossing eliminations. Double track was added between Kingston and Plymouth in 1900 and between South Braintree and Whitman in 1907.

During World War I, a short branch was built from the mainline to the Victory Destroyer Plant to carry materials and workers. Systemwide passenger service levels began to decline during the war when freight was given priority, and continued to decline thereafter. By 1924, inbound service included six trains from Plymouth, three from Whitman, two from the Bridgewater Branch, and four from Hanover. Bridgewater Branch service ended in 1925. Part of the Cambridge–Dorchester Line was constructed along a section of the main line plus the Shawmut Branch in the 1926s, ending service to the innermost stations. Despite the cuts, by 1935 the mainline still saw over 100 trains per day.

==== Abandonment ====
The New Haven Railroad declared bankruptcy in 1935, setting off a 12-year-long reorganization process. The Old Colony lease was a major liability to the New Haven. It ended the lease in 1936 but was forced to continue operating the division. In the 88 stations case, the New Haven controversially closed 88 stations in Massachusetts on July 17, 1938. Four were on the Plymouth line – North Hanson, Burrage, Halifax, and Plympton. In May 1939, the company proposed to abandon all passenger service in the "Boston Group" – the primary group of lines into Boston, including the Greenbush, Plymouth, and Middleborough lines and the shared mainline north of Braintree. A revised proposal that September was to keep Boston–Braintree service plus limited commute-hour service as far as Campello, Whitman, and Hingham.

After further controversy, a compromise schedule took effect on March 31, 1940, with service cut nearly in half but no lines abandoned. This schedule only required use of a single track and passing sidings between South Braintree and Plymouth, and the second track was removed over the following two years. On February 18, 1941, the Interstate Commerce Commission refused abandonment of the Boston Group, forcing the New Haven to continue operations on the Old Colony. Additional traffic during World War II temporarily boosted the railroad's fortunes, but the postwar years again saw mounting deficits on the Old Colony Division. Hanover Branch service ended in 1948. Sharp cuts in March 1949 removed most off-peak service; the Plymouth line was left with just three daily round trips. The northern section of the mainline was reduced to two tracks in the early 1950s.

Under the 1951–1954 presidency of Frederic C. Dumaine Jr., the New Haven increased passenger service, using new Budd Rail Diesel Cars to reduce costs. By April 1954, there were seven daily inbound trains from Plymouth, and 15 trains from South Braintree supplemented service on the mainline. However, Patrick B. McGinnis taking the railroad's presidency in 1954 resulted in deferred maintenance and canceled plans for further service expansion. The New Haven again proposed to abandon all Old Colony service. A temporary state subsidy was introduced in 1958 to continue Greenbush, Plymouth, Middleborough, and Cape Cod service for an additional year while the Southeast Expressway and other highways were under construction. The final day of service was June 30, 1959, as the subsidy expired. Bus companies including the Eastern Massachusetts Street Railway and Plymouth and Brockton Street Railway expanded their South Shore commuter service.

=== 1960s and 1970s ===
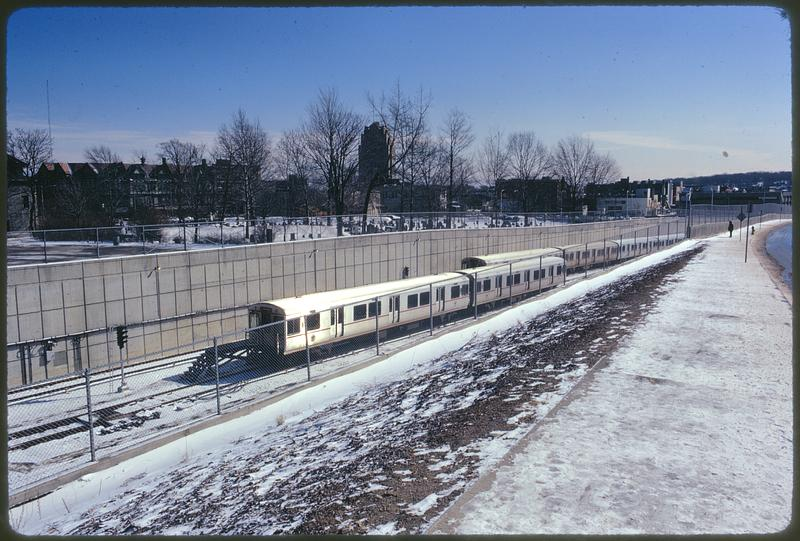
The Red Line in Quincy in 1973

The wooden trestles of the drawbridge carrying the Old Colony main line over the Neponset River between Boston and Quincy burned on the night of July 22–23, 1960. The New Haven collected insurance money but refused to rebuild the bridge, instead rerouting freight trains via Middleborough. The Massachusetts Bay Transportation Authority (MBTA) was formed in August 1964 as an expansion of the urban Metropolitan Transit Authority into the surrounding suburbs. The MBTA was intended to subsidize commuter rail service – and to replace much of it with rapid transit extensions.

The MBTA's first such project was a branch of the Red Line (Cambridge–Dorchester Line) following the Old Colony alignment to Braintree. (Note: A rapid transit extension to Braintree had been proposed by regional plans in 1926 and 1945. That plan was overwhelmingly rejected by Quincy and Braintree voters in 1948. Not until Old Colony service ended did the plan gain traction.) In November 1965, the MBTA purchased the Old Colony main line between Boston and South Braintree from the New Haven. The Red Line opened to Quincy Center station in September 1971 and Braintree station in South Braintree in March 1980. Within Boston, a single freight track paralleled the new tracks. Although there was no freight service through Quincy, a single-track right-of-way was reserved for future freight use when the extension was built.

The New Haven Railroad merged into Penn Central at the end of 1968. In 1970, following revolts against freeways in the urban core, Massachusetts governor Francis Sargent placed a moratorium on new highway construction inside the Route 128 beltway. The resulting cancellation of the Southwest Expressway by the Boston Transportation Planning Review meant the already-overcrowded Southeast Expressway would continue to be the only highway into Boston from the south. In January 1973, the MBTA acquired most of Penn Central's suburban lines around Boston, including the Plymouth line. Freight service continued to operate on the line, though the segment from North Plymouth to Plymouth was out of service by the late 1970s.

=== Restoration ===
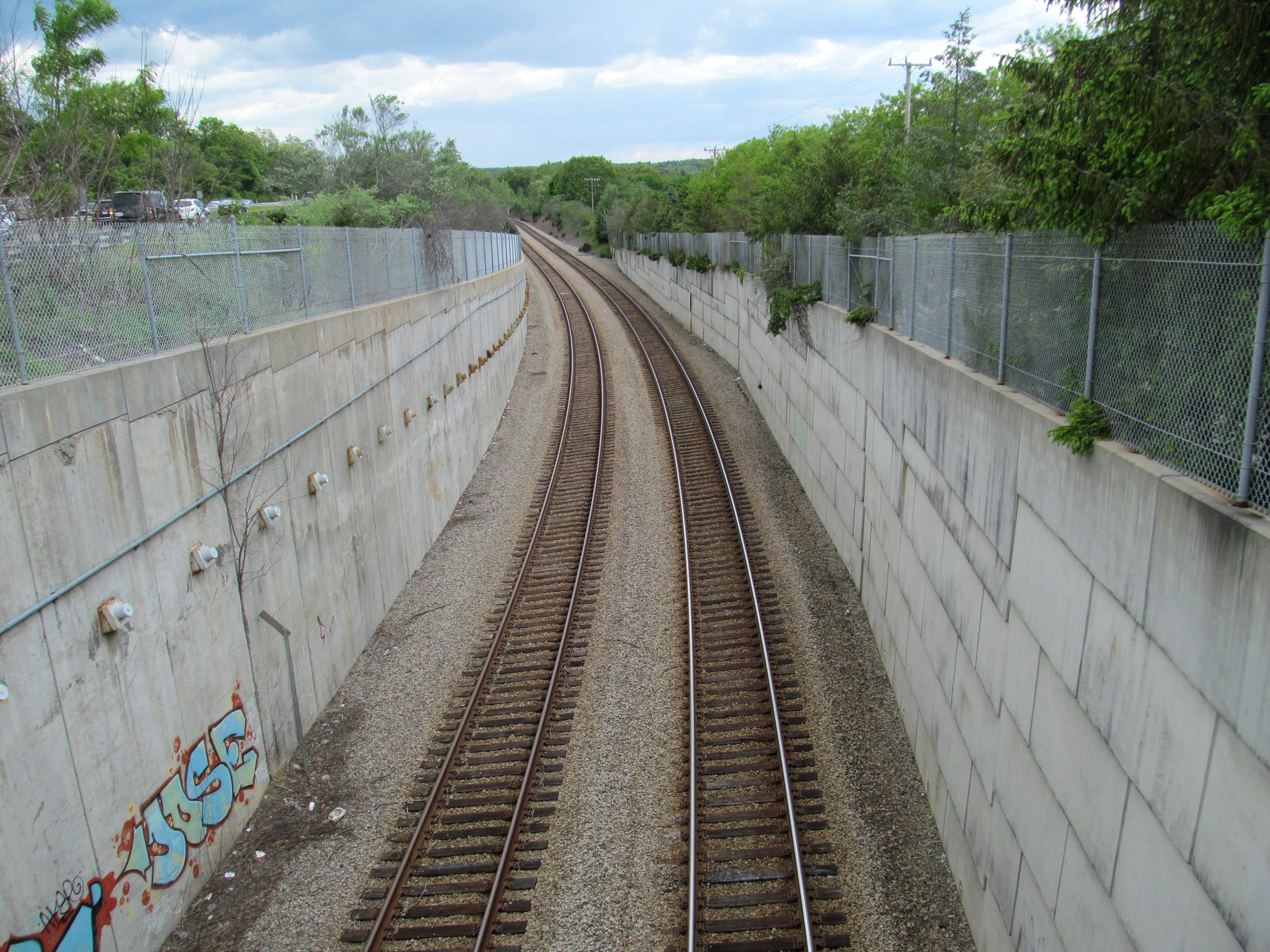
The northern end of the Kingston Branch tunnel under Route 3

In 1984, a state-directed MBTA study found that restoration of commuter rail service on the former Old Colony lines would be feasible. A Draft Environmental Impact Statement for restoration of service on the Middleborough, Plymouth, and Greenbush lines was released in May 1990. It called for the terminal to be in North Plymouth south of Cordage Park, with Kingston/Route 3 station next to the Route 3 expressway. A layover yard would have been built in Cordage Park. In 1991, the state agreed to build a set of transit projects as part of an agreement with the Conservation Law Foundation (CLF), which had threatened a lawsuit over auto emissions from the Central Artery/Tunnel Project (Big Dig). Among these projects was the "Old Colony Commuter Rail Line Extension", to be complete by the end of 1996.

The terminal plans became the subject of local controversy. The owner of both the proposed station sites objected to both; he planned to develop the Plymouth station site with residential buildings, and did not wish to sell the Kingston station site where he owned a beer distribution warehouse. The Cordage Park owners objected to the layover yard on their property but wanted the station moved there. In April 1991, the MBTA announced a new plan. A new rail spur would be built along Route 3 with a Kingston station and layover yard in a former sand and gravel lot being redeveloped as an industrial park. The Plymouth station would be built at Cordage Park with no layover yard; it would only have off-peak and weekend service, with peak-hour service only running to Kingston. (Note: The owner of the sand and gravel lot had originally proposed the Kingston spur in lieu of a Plymouth station.) The Final Environmental Impact Statement for the Middleborough and Plymouth lines – often called the "Old Colony Lines" – was released in 1992. (Note: Unlike the other two lines, the Greenbush Line involved reactivation of abandoned right-of-way, and it proved more controversial. The MBTA moved forward with the Middleborough and Plymouth lines; after significant controversy, the Greenbush Line ultimately opened in 2007.) It incorporated the terminal changes announced in 1991. It also moved the Abington station from North Abington to a site near the town center and removed a potential stop in downtown Kingston.

Construction of the $560 million project began in 1993, with service then expected to begin in late 1996. Which stations to include on the shared mainline between Braintree and Boston also proved controversial. Original plans called only for a stop at Braintree. In September 1995, state governor Bill Weld announced that a platform would be built at Quincy Center instead. Later that year, the MBTA agreed to build both stations. In November 1996, the MBTA agreed to add a stop at JFK/UMass station as well. Limited weekday service with four daily round trips each on the Middleborough/Lakeville Line and Plymouth/Kingston Line began on September 29, 1997. Full service, including service to Plymouth, began on November 30, 1997. The Plymouth/Kingston Line had fifteen round trips on weekdays and eight on weekends. Weekend and some weekday trains began stopping at JFK/UMass on April 30, 2001.

=== Service since 2001 ===
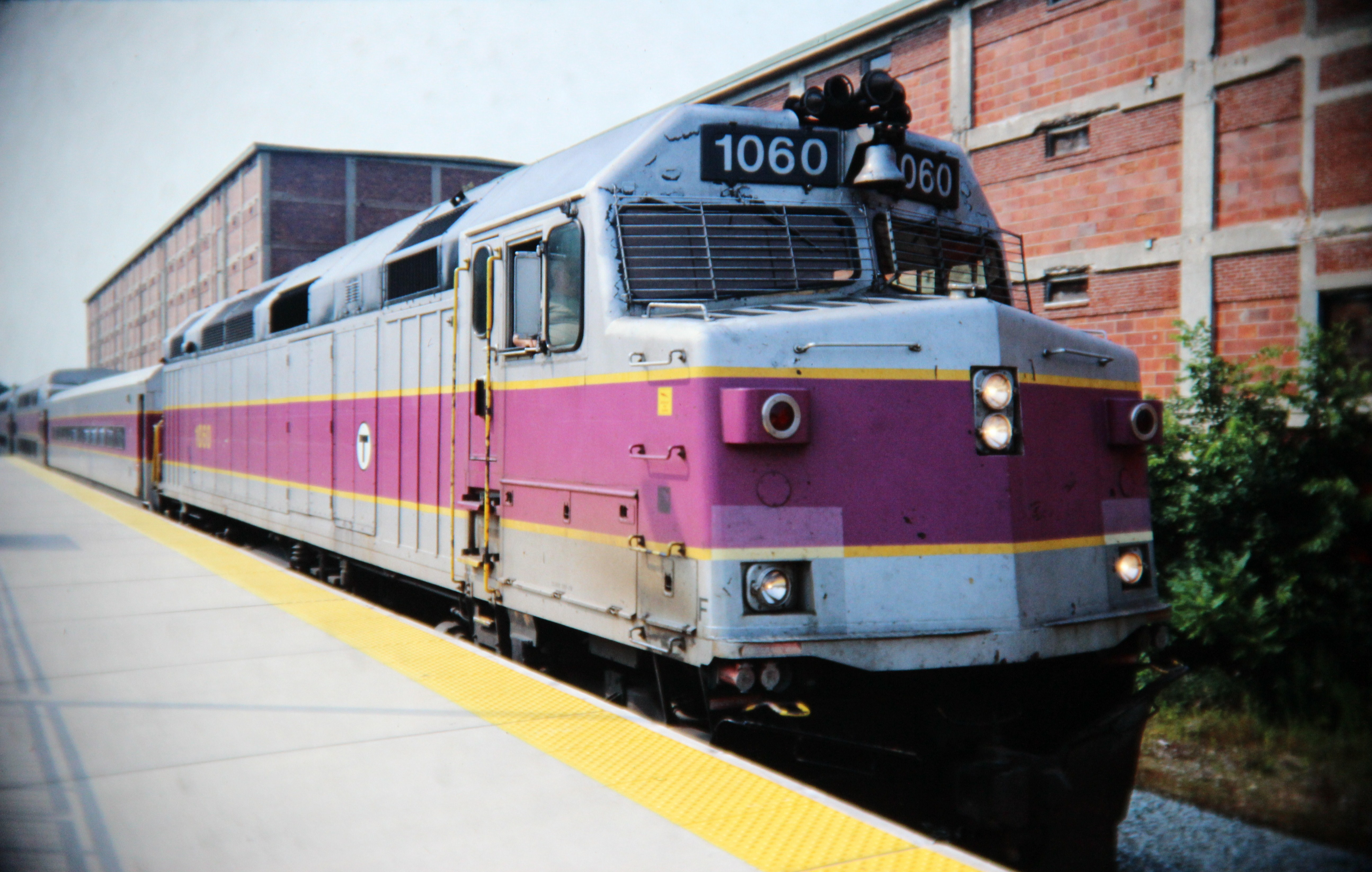
A train at Plymouth station in 2001

In 2007, the MBTA discovered that concrete ties used on the Old Colony Lines were failing due to manufacturing errors. The rate of failures increased during the following two winters, affecting service and causing speed restrictions. In 2010, the MBTA began a project to replace the 150,000 failing ties, which were part of a batch of 600,000 made in the 1990s, with wooden ties. (Note: Amtrak and the Long Island Rail Road also had to replace large numbers of ties from that batch.) Some replacement work in Bridgewater and Middleborough took place in 2010. Midday weekday service on the Plymouth/Kingston Line was replaced by buses from May 31 to September 19, 2011. Weekend service on the line was replaced from April 30 to December 18, 2011. The project was completed in May 2012 at a cost of $91.5 million.

Weekend service on the Plymouth/Kingston Line, Needham Line, and Greenbush Line was eliminated on July 7, 2012, as part of fare increases and service cuts to close the agency's operating budget shortfall. The MBTA ran special weekend service to Plymouth for two weekends leading up to the 2014 Thanksgiving holiday. The two round trips per day were intended only for tourists going to Plymouth; they did not run on schedules allowing day trips to Boston. Full weekend service on the Plymouth/Kingston Line, as well as weekend service on the Greenbush Line and Saturday service on the Needham Line, resumed on December 27, 2014.

The fork at the end of the Plymouth/Kingston Line created operational issues, since a single train could not serve both terminal stations without reversing direction. Most trains only served one terminal, but several midday trains had unusually long running times because they served both. By 2015, the MBTA intended to address the issue with schedule changes.

Substantially reduced schedules were in effect on the Commuter Rail system from March 16 to June 23, 2020, due to the COVID-19 pandemic. In November 2020, as part of service cuts during the pandemic, the MBTA proposed to close Plymouth along with five other low-ridership stations on other lines. On December 14, the MBTA Board voted to enact a more limited set of cuts, including indefinitely closing Plymouth and four of the other five stations. That day, temporary reduced schedules were again put into place. On January 23, 2021, reduced schedules went into place with no weekend service on seven lines, including the Plymouth/Kingston Line.

Plymouth station closed on April 5, 2021, with the line renamed the Kingston Line. That schedule change also included regional rail-style service with more frequency midday service on the Kingston Line. Additionally, the last Kingston-bound train of the night departed from Braintree station, with a timed transfer from a Middleborough/Lakeville Line train. Weekend service on the Kingston line and the six other lines resumed on July 3, 2021. In June 2021, the MBTA indicated that Plymouth station would reopen on July 5, 2022 (the start of a new fiscal year). The station did not reopen at that time, however, with a date for service restoration not announced. By October 2022, Kingston service was at 4,171 daily boardings – 69% of pre-COVID ridership. This increased to 5,310 daily boardings in 2024. Off-peak and weekend stops at JFK/UMass were removed effective July 21, 2025, leaving only peak-hour peak-direction stops.

== Stations ==
Fare zone	Location	Miles (km)	Station	Connections and notes
1A	Boston	0.0 (0.0)	South Station	Amtrak: Acela, Lake Shore Limited, Northeast Regional; MBTA Commuter Rail: Fall River/New Bedford Line, Fairmount Line, Framingham/Worcester Line, Franklin/Foxboro Line, Greenbush Line, Needham Line, Providence/Stoughton Line, CapeFlyer (seasonal); MBTA subway: Red Line; Silver Line (SL1, SL2, SL3, SL4); MBTA bus: 4, 7, 11; Intercity buses at South Station Bus Terminal
1A	Boston	2.3 (3.7)	JFK/UMass	MBTA Commuter Rail: Fall River/New Bedford Line, Greenbush Line; MBTA subway: Red Line; MBTA bus: 8, 16, 41; UMass Boston shuttle
1	Quincy	7.9 (12.7)	Quincy Center	MBTA Commuter Rail: Fall River/New Bedford Line, Greenbush Line; MBTA subway: Red Line; MBTA bus: 210, 211, 215, 216, 217, 220, 222, 225, 230, 236, 238, 245
2	Braintree	10.9 (17.5)	Braintree	MBTA Commuter Rail: Fall River/New Bedford Line, CapeFlyer (seasonal); MBTA subway: Red Line; MBTA bus: 226, 230, 236
3	Weymouth	15.8 (25.4)	South Weymouth	
4	Abington	19.4 (31.2)	Abington	
5	Whitman	21.2 (34.1)	Whitman	
6	Hanson	24.4 (39.3)	Hanson	
7	Halifax	28.1 (45.2)	Halifax	
8	Kingston	35.1 (56.5)	Kingston	On the Kingston Branch; GATRA: Freedom Link, Liberty Link, SAIL
8	Plymouth	35.6 (57.3)	Plymouth	Closed indefinitely
