= Fall River/New Bedford Line =

Commuter rail line in Massachusetts, US

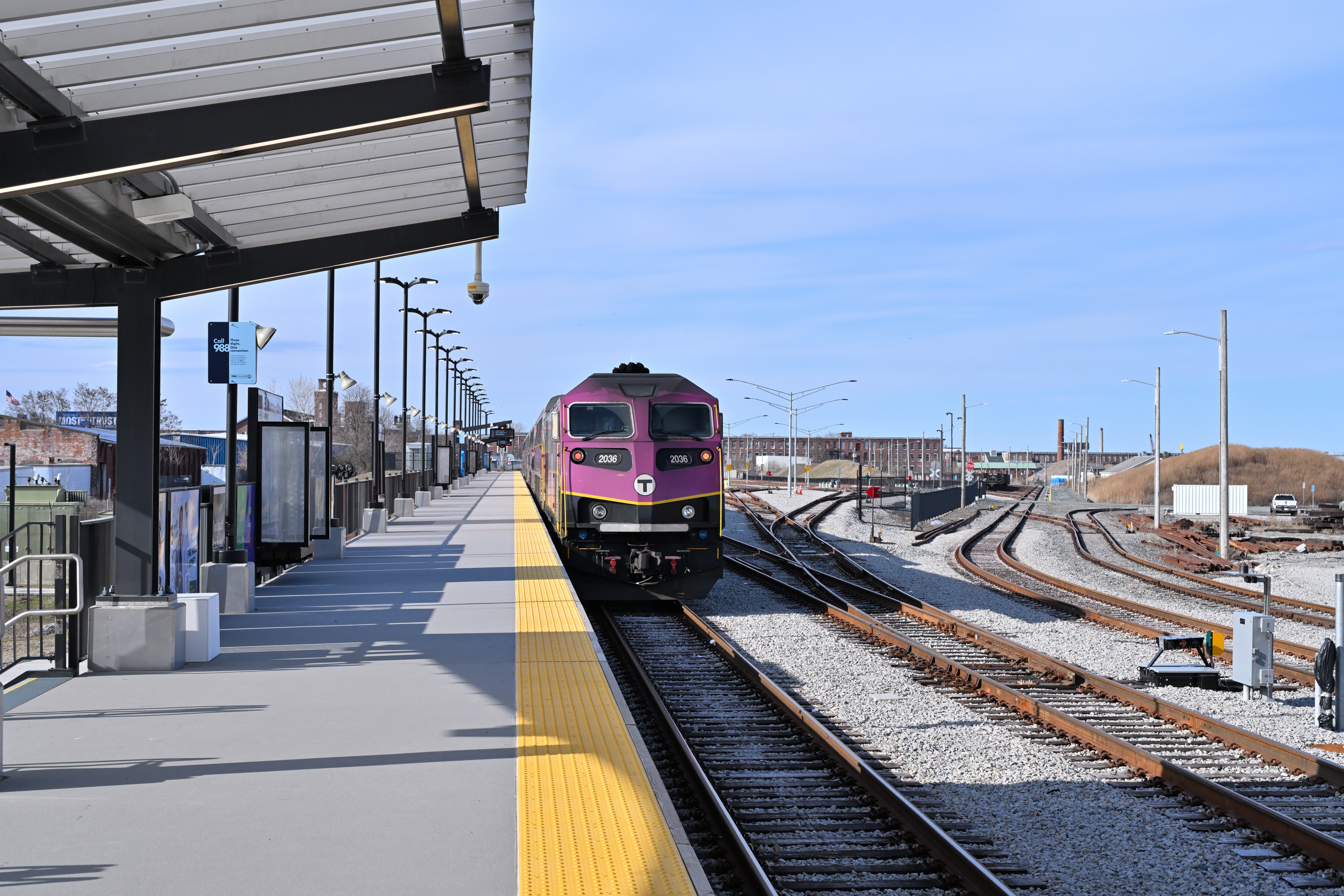
- An inbound train leaving New Bedford station in 2025

Overview
- Owner: Massachusetts Bay Transportation Authority
- Locale: Southeastern Massachusetts
- Termini: South Station; Fall River and New Bedford
- Stations: 15

Service
- Type: Commuter rail
- System: MBTA Commuter Rail
- Train number(s): 8002-8182 (weekdays); 8501-8667 (weekends)
- Operator: Keolis North America
- Daily ridership: 6,669 (2024)

History
- Opened: September 29, 1997 (as Middleborough/Lakeville Line)
- Last extension: March 24, 2025 (to Fall River and New Bedford)

Technical
- Line length: Boston–Fall River: 56.6 miles (91.1 km); Boston–New Bedford: 60.0 miles (96.6 km)
- Num of tracks: 1–2
- Track gauge: 4 ft 8 1/2 in (1,435 mm)
- Operating speed: 79 miles per hour (127 km/h)

The Fall River/New Bedford Line (formerly the Middleborough/Lakeville Line) is a commuter rail line of the MBTA Commuter Rail system in southeastern Massachusetts, United States. It runs south from Boston to Taunton, where it splits into branches to Fall River and New Bedford. There are 10 intermediate stations on the combined section and one on each branch. With a distance of 60 miles (97 km) from Boston to New Bedford and 56.6 miles (91.1 km) to Fall River, it is the second-longest line in the system.

Most of the line originated as the Fall River Railroad, which opened in segments between Fall River and South Braintree via Middleborough in 1845 and 1846. At South Braintree, it met the Old Colony Railroad, which provided a connection to Boston. The two railroads merged in 1854 to form the Old Colony and Fall River Railroad. While the Dighton and Somerset Railroad largely replaced the line as a Boston–Fall River route in 1866, it remained busy with commuter and Boston–Cape Cod traffic. Mergers brought it under the Old Colony Railroad in 1872 and the New York, New Haven and Hartford Railroad in 1893.

Commuter service peaked in the early 20th century and began to decline in the 1910s. Service on the Fall River–Middleborough segment ended in 1931. After two decades of attempts to end Old Colony Division service, the New Haven terminated it in 1959. Planning for the Massachusetts Bay Transportation Authority to restore service on the Middleborough line began in the 1970s. Construction began in 1993, and service on the Middleborough/Lakeville Line began in 1997. Seasonal CapeFlyer excursion service began using the line in 2013. The line was extended and renamed in 2025 as part of the first phase of the South Coast Rail project. An extension from Middleborough to Buzzards Bay or Bourne is proposed.

== Operation ==
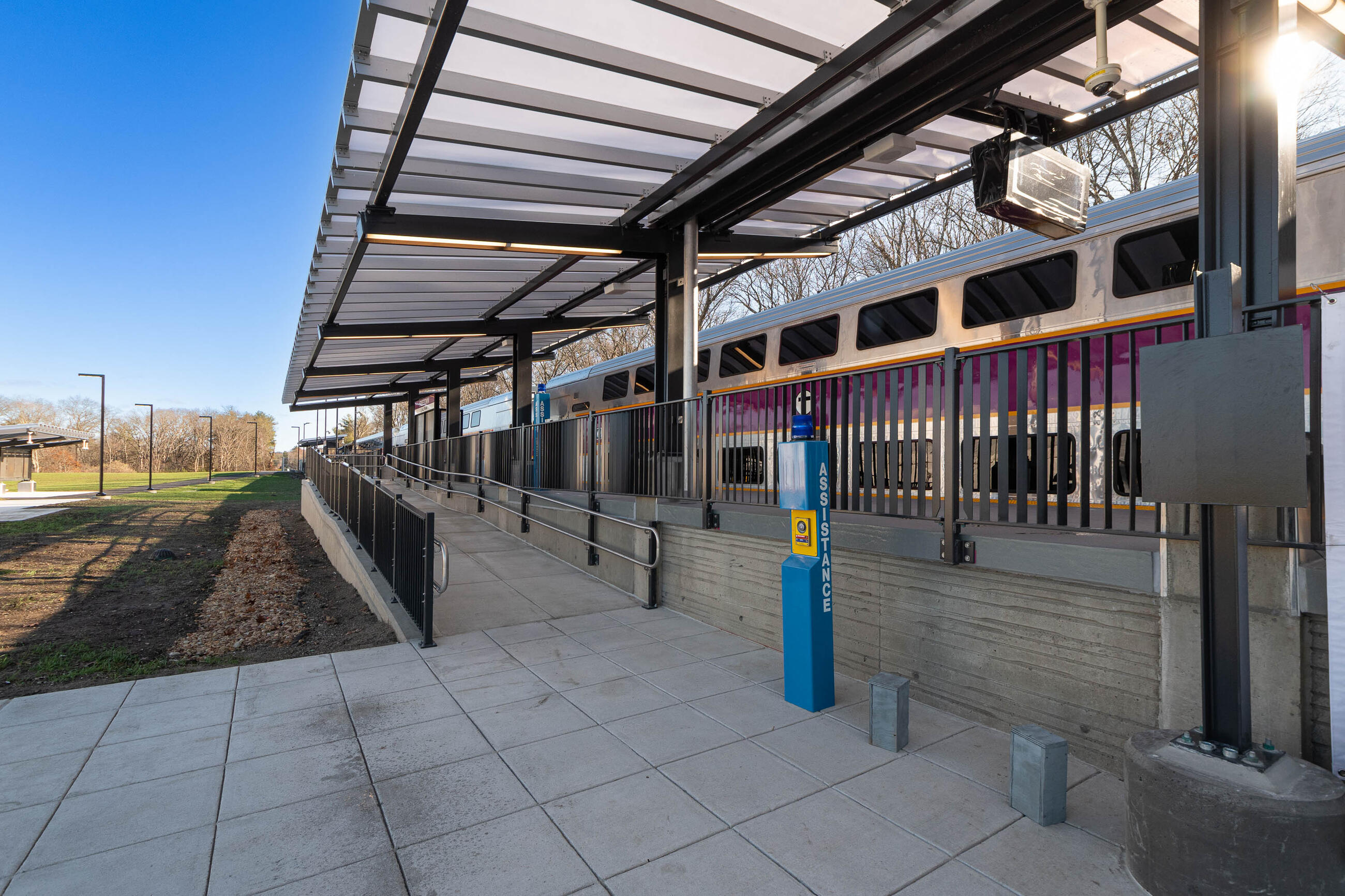
Freetown station prior to opening

The northern portion of the line follows the Middleborough Main Line, which runs approximately north–south from Boston to Middleborough. The northernmost section from South Station through Boston, Quincy, and Braintree is shared with the Kingston Line and Greenbush Line. The line continues south through Randolph, Holbrook, Avon, Brockton, West Bridgewater, East Bridgewater, and Bridgewater. Intermediate stations are served at JFK/UMass, Quincy Center, Braintree, Holbrook/Randolph, Montello, Brockton, Campello, and Bridgewater.

In downtown Middleborough, it turns west at Pilgrim Junction just north of Middleborough station. It follows the Middleboro Secondary west to Cotley Junction in southern Taunton, then the New Bedford Main Line southeast to Myricks via East Taunton station. From Myricks, the New Bedford Branch follows the New Bedford Main Line to New Bedford station via Church Street station, while the Fall River Branch follows the Fall River Secondary to Fall River station via Freetown station.

Like the rest of the MBTA Commuter Rail system, the line operates using push-pull trains with diesel locomotives. Maximum speeds are 79 miles per hour (127 km/h) south of Braintree and 59 miles per hour (95 km/h) to the north. The line is mostly single track with passing sidings; there is some double track in Boston, Quincy, Braintree, and Brockton, and between Cotley Junction and Myricks Junction. Layover yards for the line are located in Fall River and New Bedford, plus an older yard in Middleborough. All stations are accessible with full-length high-level platforms.

As of October 2025, the portion between East Taunton and Boston has 16 round trips on weekdays and 13 on weekends. These trips are split approximately equally between the Fall River and New Bedford branches. On weekdays, most Boston trains have a shuttle train serving the other branch, with a cross-platform transfer at East Taunton. Typical running times for through trains are 94 to 109 minutes. The CapeFlyer operates one daily round trip between Boston and Hyannis on Friday evenings, Saturdays, and Sundays during the summer tourist season (typically Memorial Day weekend in late May to Labor Day weekend in early September). It uses the portion of the line north of Middleborough with stops at Braintree and Brockton.

== History ==
=== Previous service ===
==== Old Colony Railroad ====
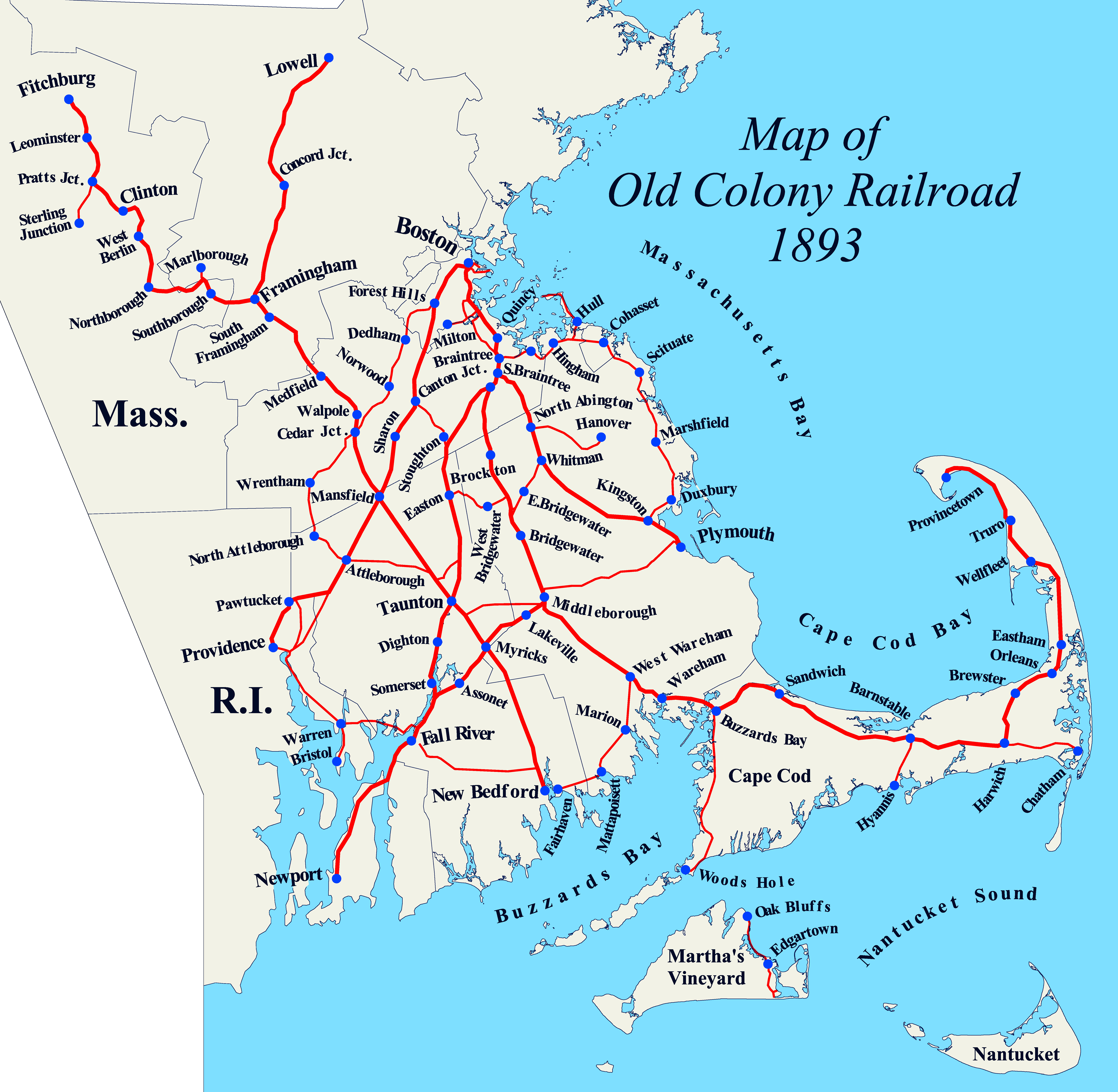
Map of the Old Colony Railroad in 1893

The Fall River Railroad was formed in March 1845 (Note: Until August 1846, its name was the United Corporation of the Middleborough Railroad Corporation with the Fall River Branch Railroad Company and the Randolph and Bridgewater Railroad Corporation.) as the merger of three smaller railroads. It opened in phases from June 9, 1845 to December 21, 1846, forming a line between Fall River and South Braintree via Middleborough. At South Braintree, it connected with the Old Colony Railroad, which had opened between Boston and Plymouth on November 10, 1845. In 1847, the railroad opened a short extension to Fall River Wharf and began Fall River Line rail–steamboat service between Boston and New York. The Cape Cod Railroad opened from Middleborough to Sandwich on Cape Cod in 1848 and to Hyannis in 1854. The Old Colony and the Fall River merged in 1854 to form the Old Colony and Fall River Railroad. Schedules permitted commuting to Boston from as far south as Bridgewater from then onwards. North Bridgewater (later renamed Brockton) was a turnback point for short turn trains in the late 1850s and early 1860s.

The Dighton and Somerset Railroad, owned by the Old Colony and Newport (1863 successor to the Old Colony and Fall River), opened in September 1866. It connected to the Fall River Railroad line at Braintree Highlands and Somerset Junction, providing a shorter Boston–Fall River route that also served Taunton. The Dighton and Somerset became the railroad's primary Boston–Fall River route, but the older route remained busy with Cape Cod traffic. The Old Colony and Newport Railroad and the Cape Cod Railroad merged in 1872 to form the Old Colony Railroad. Campello in southern Brockton was a turnback point from the early 1870s on.

Continued traffic growth led the Old Colony to double-track several of their main lines in the 1880s and 1890s. (Note: The Boston–Braintree main line was double-tracked in 1848; the northern portion was quadruple-tracked in the early 20th century.) Double track was extended south from South Braintree to Randolph in 1882, to Campello in 1883, to Bridgewater in 1884, and Middleborough in 1885. Schedules were consistently suitable for commuting from Middleborough after the mid-1880s. The West Bridgewater Branch, which connected the line with the Dighton and Somerset, was completed in 1888. Double track was completed from Middleborough to Buzzards Bay in 1893. Schedules permitted commuting from Cape Cod beginning in 1894.

==== New Haven Railroad ====
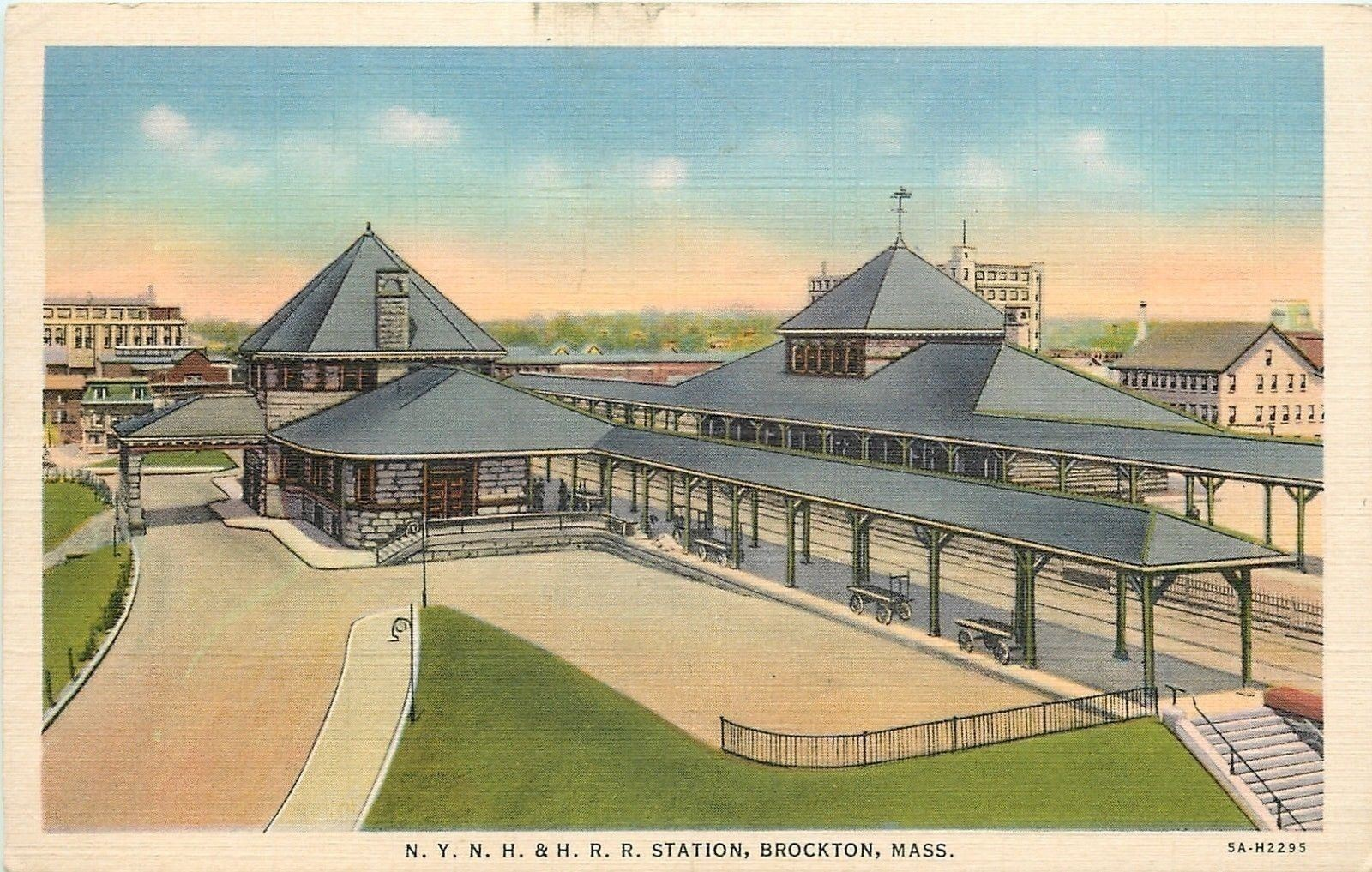
Postcard of the 1890s-built Brockton station

The New York, New Haven and Hartford Railroad leased the Old Colony in 1893. A construction project lasting from 1894 to 1897 elevated the tracks through downtown Brockton to eliminate grade crossings. Service on the Middleborough line was at its peak from about 1898 to 1914. In 1898, daily inbound service to Boston included six trains from Cape Cod, three from Fall River, six from Middleborough, seven from Campello, and one from Stoughton via the West Bridgewater Branch. There were also three trains from Montello to Boston that operated south from Montello through Brockton then used branchlines to reach Boston. (Note: Two trains used the West Bridgewater Branch and Stoughton Branch; one used the Bridgewater Branch and the Plymouth main line. Six additional trains operated from Bridgewater to Boston using the Bridgewater Branch.) Numerous trains from the Old Colony Division's many branches used the mainline north of Braintree; many of them split and merged at Braintree.

The middle section of the original Fall River Railroad, between Middleborough and Myricks, lost importance after the turn of the century, though commuter service from Fall River was available for several years beginning in 1915. Service levels began to decline during World War I when freight was given priority and continued to decline thereafter. Commuter-suitable service was not always available from Cape Cod after 1919. By 1924, inbound service included five trains from Cape Cod, one from Fall River, five from Middleborough, three from Bridgewater, eight from Campello, and one from North Easton via the West Bridgewater Branch (on which service ended in 1925). Fall River service via Middleborough ended in 1931.

==== Abandonment ====
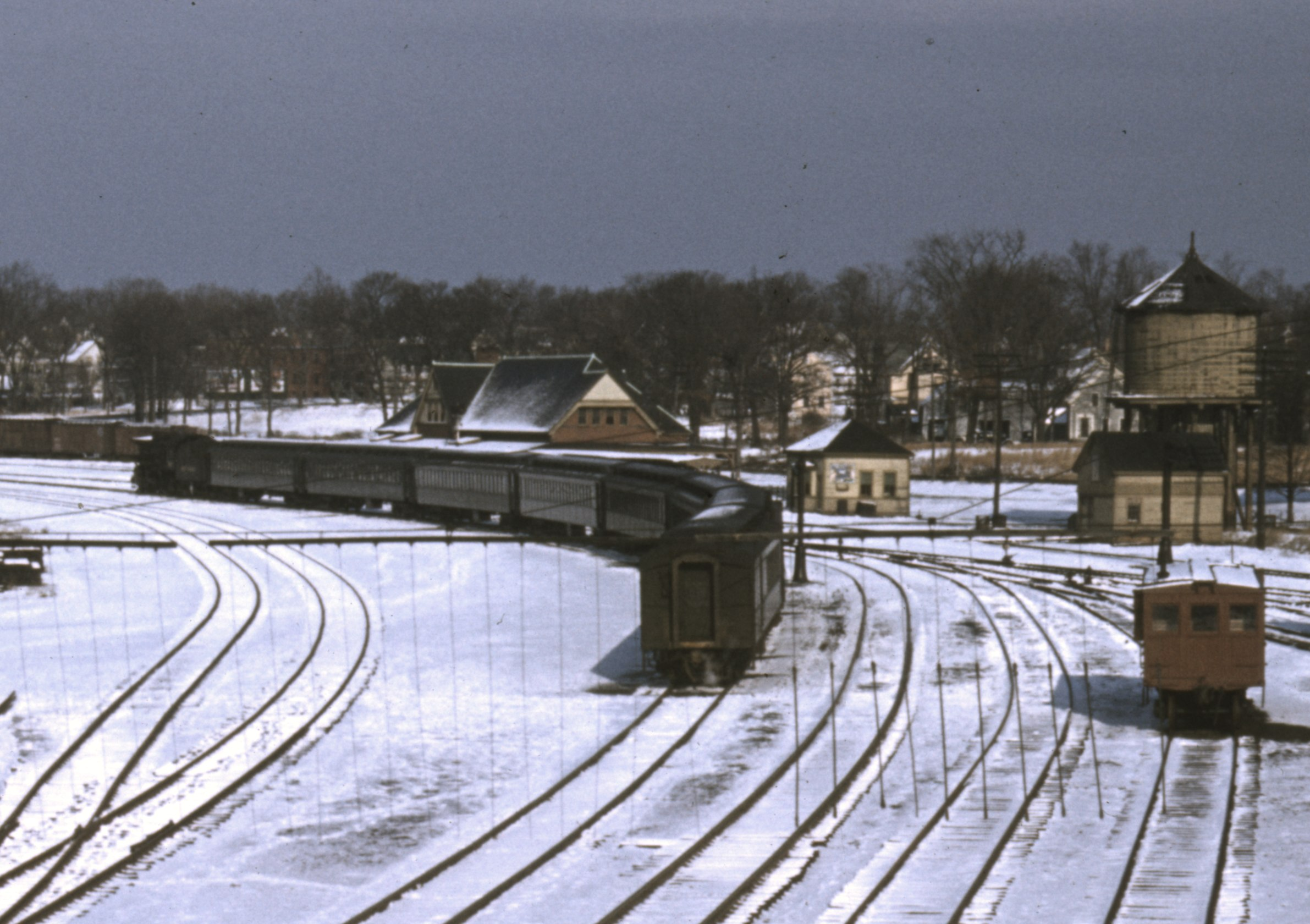
A train at Middleborough around 1940

The New Haven Railroad declared bankruptcy in 1935, setting off a 12-year-long reorganization process. The Old Colony lease was a major liability to the New Haven. It ended the lease in 1936 but was forced to continue operating the division. In the 88 stations case, the New Haven controversially closed 88 stations in Massachusetts on July 17, 1938. Three were on the Middleborough line and three more between Middleborough and the Cape Cod Canal. (Note: Those on the Middleborough line were Matfield, Westdale, and Stanley – all between Brockton and Middleboro. Rock, South Middleboro, and Tremont were all between Middleborough and Wareham.) In May 1939, the company proposed to abandon all passenger service in the "Boston Group" – the primary group of lines into Boston, including the Greenbush, Plymouth, and Middleborough lines and the shared mainline north of Braintree. A revised proposal that September was to keep Boston–Braintree service plus limited commute-hour service as far as Campello, Whitman, and Hingham.

After further controversy, a compromise schedule took effect on March 31, 1940, with service cut nearly in half but no lines abandoned. This schedule only required use of a single track and passing sidings south of Bridgewater; the second track between Bridgewater and Buzzards Bay was removed over the following two years. On February 18, 1941, the Interstate Commerce Commission refused abandonment of the Boston Group, forcing the New Haven to continue operations on the Old Colony. Additional traffic during World War II temporarily boosted the railroad's fortunes, but the postwar years again saw mounting deficits on the Old Colony Division. Sharp cuts in March 1949 removed most off-peak service; the Middleborough line was left with two inbound trains from Cape Cod and three from Middleborough.

Under the 1951–1954 presidency of Frederic C. Dumaine Jr., the New Haven increased passenger service, using new Budd Rail Diesel Cars to reduce costs. By April 1954, there were three daily inbound trains from Cape Cod, four from Middleborough, and six from Brockton. However, Patrick B. McGinnis taking the railroad's presidency in 1954 resulted in deferred maintenance and cancelled plans for further service expansion. The New Haven again proposed to abandon all Old Colony service. A temporary state subsidy was introduced in 1958 to continue Greenbush, Plymouth, Middleborough, and Cape Cod service for an additional year while the Southeast Expressway and other highways were under construction. The final day of service was June 30, 1959, as the subsidy expired. Bus companies including the Eastern Massachusetts Street Railway and Plymouth and Brockton Street Railway expanded their South Shore commuter service.

=== 1960s and 1970s ===
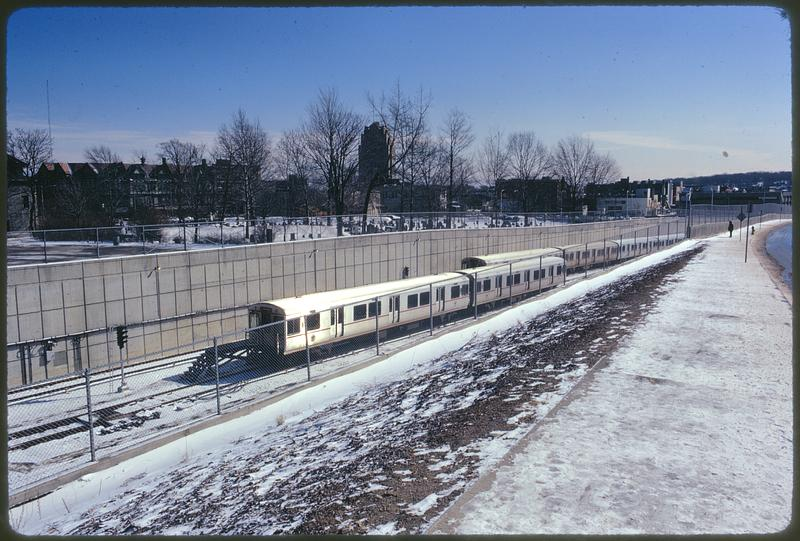
The Red Line in Quincy in 1973

In early 1960, state and Cape Cod officials reached an agreement with the New Haven to operate Boston–Cape Cod and New York–Cape Cod service during the busy summer tourist season. The New York trains, the Day Cape Codder and Neptune, operated as planned. However, the wooden trestles of the drawbridge carrying the Old Colony main line over the Neponset River between Boston and Quincy burned on the night of July 22–23, 1960. The New Haven collected insurance money but refused to rebuild the bridge, instead rerouting freight trains via Middleborough. For passengers, connections were provided between Shore Line trains and New York–Cape Cod trains at Attleboro. For the 1961 season, Boston–Cape Cod service ran via Stoughton. The New York trains ran until 1964. Freight service continued to use the Middleborough line.

The Massachusetts Bay Transportation Authority (MBTA) was formed in August 1964 as an expansion of the urban Metropolitan Transit Authority into the surrounding suburbs. The MBTA was intended to subsidize commuter rail service – and to replace much of it with rapid transit extensions. The MBTA's first such project was a branch of the Red Line (Cambridge–Dorchester Line) following the Old Colony alignment to Braintree. (Note: Part of the Cambridge–Dorchester Line had previously been constructed along a section of the main line plus the Shawmut Branch in the 1920s. A rapid transit extension to Braintree had been proposed by regional plans in 1926 and 1945. That plan was overwhelmingly rejected by Quincy and Braintree voters in 1948. Not until Old Colony service ended did the plan gain traction.) In November 1965, the MBTA purchased the Old Colony main line between Boston and South Braintree from the New Haven. By 1966, the MBTA expected to eventually extend the line to Braintree Highlands or Holbrook on the Middleborough line, with a spur to Weymouth or Hingham. The Red Line opened to Quincy Center station in September 1971 and Braintree station in South Braintree in March 1980. Within Boston, a single freight track paralleled the new tracks. Although there was no freight service through Quincy, a single-track right-of-way was reserved for future freight use when the extension was built.

The New Haven Railroad merged into Penn Central at the end of 1968. In 1970, following revolts against freeways in the urban core, Massachusetts governor Francis Sargent placed a moratorium on new highway construction inside the Route 128 beltway. The resulting cancellation of the Southwest Expressway by the Boston Transportation Planning Review meant the already-overcrowded Southeast Expressway would continue to be the only highway into Boston from the south. In January 1973, the MBTA acquired most of Penn Central's suburban lines around Boston, including the Middleborough line as far south as Campello.

=== Restoration ===
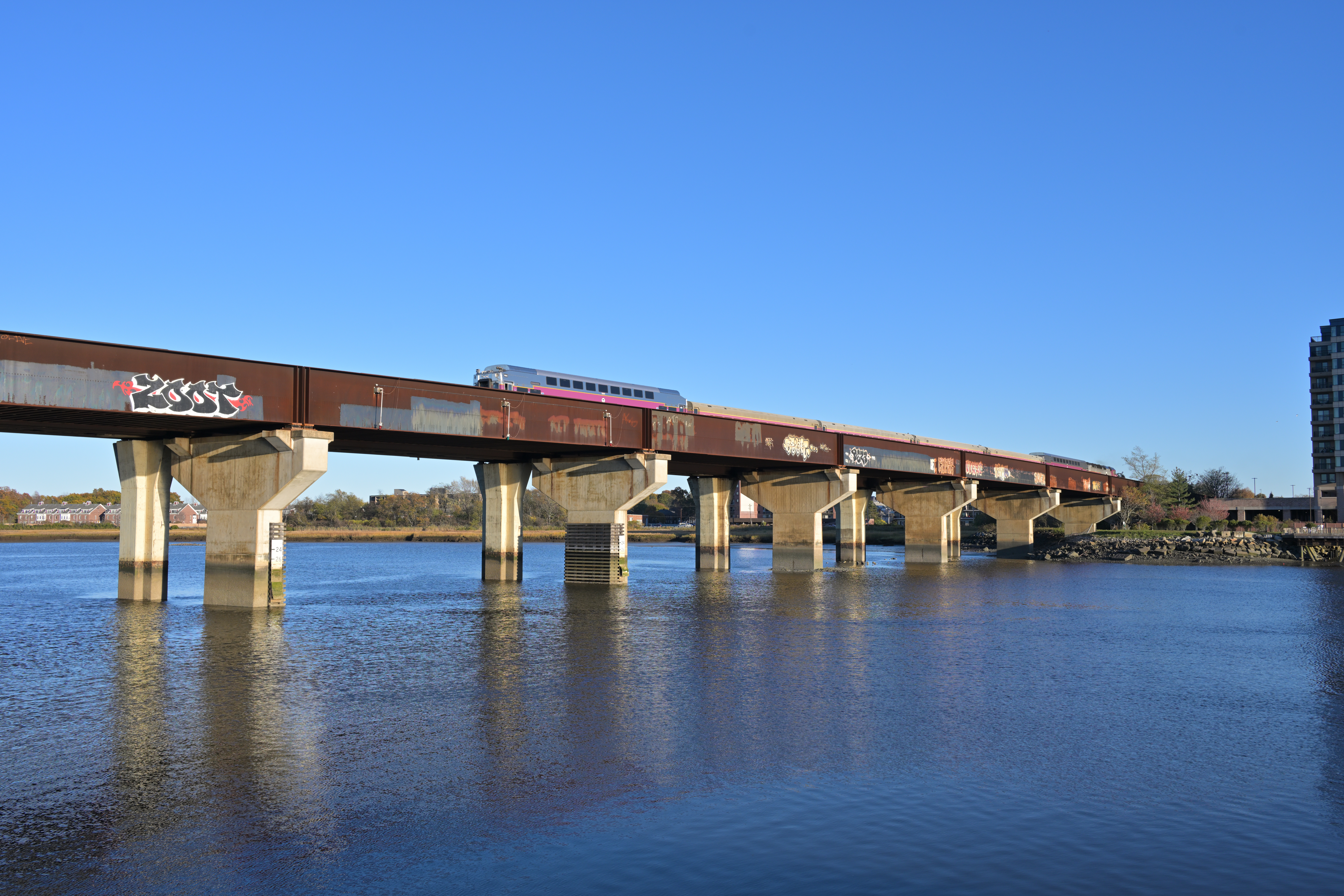
A major part of the Old Colony Lines restoration was the George L. Anderson Bridge over the Neponset River.

A 1974 state report evaluated potential service as far as Hyannis and Falmouth on Cape Cod. It estimated construction costs of $13.6 million to $23 million (equivalent to $69–117 million in 2025), plus $9.2 million ($47 million) for purchasing the tracks and $2.5 to $6.8 million ($13–34 million) for equipment. On October 15, 1979, a special train ran from Braintree to Middleborough to publicize the state's plans for restored service. In 1984, a state-directed MBTA study found that restoration of commuter rail service on the former Old Colony lines would be feasible. During the summers of 1984 to 1988, the Cape Cod and Hyannis Railroad operated passenger service between Braintree station and Cape Cod. Intended partially as a precursor to full commuter rail service, it made five intermediate stops (Holbrook, Brockton, Bridgewater, Middleborough, and Wareham) between Braintree and Buzzards Bay.

A Draft Environmental Impact Statement (DEIS) for restoration of service on the Middleborough, Plymouth, and Greenbush lines was released in May 1990. In 1991, the state agreed to build a set of transit projects as part of an agreement with the Conservation Law Foundation (CLF), which had threatened a lawsuit over auto emissions from the Central Artery/Tunnel Project (Big Dig). Among these projects was the "Old Colony Commuter Rail Line Extension", to be complete by the end of 1996. The Final Environmental Impact Statement for the Middleborough and Plymouth lines – often called the "Old Colony Lines" – was released in 1992. (Note: Unlike the other two lines, the Greenbush Line involved reactivation of abandoned right-of-way, and it proved more controversial. The MBTA moved forward with the Middleborough and Plymouth lines; after significant controversy, the Greenbush Line ultimately opened in 2007.) Two station sites considered in the DEIS – Westdale in West Bridgewater and Middleborough/Route 44 in northern Middleborough – were dropped from consideration.

Construction of the $560 million project began in 1993, with service then expected to begin in late 1996. Which stations to include on the shared mainline between Braintree and Boston proved controversial. Original plans called only for a stop at Braintree. In September 1995, state governor Bill Weld announced that a platform would be built at Quincy Center instead. Later that year, the MBTA agreed to build both stations. In November 1996, the MBTA agreed to add a stop at JFK/UMass station as well. Limited weekday service with four daily round trips each on the Middleborough/Lakeville Line and Plymouth/Kingston Line began on September 29, 1997. Full service began on November 30, 1997. The Middleborough/Lakeville Line had twelve round trips on weekdays and seven on weekends. Weekend and some weekday trains began stopping at JFK/UMass on April 30, 2001.

=== Service since 1997 ===
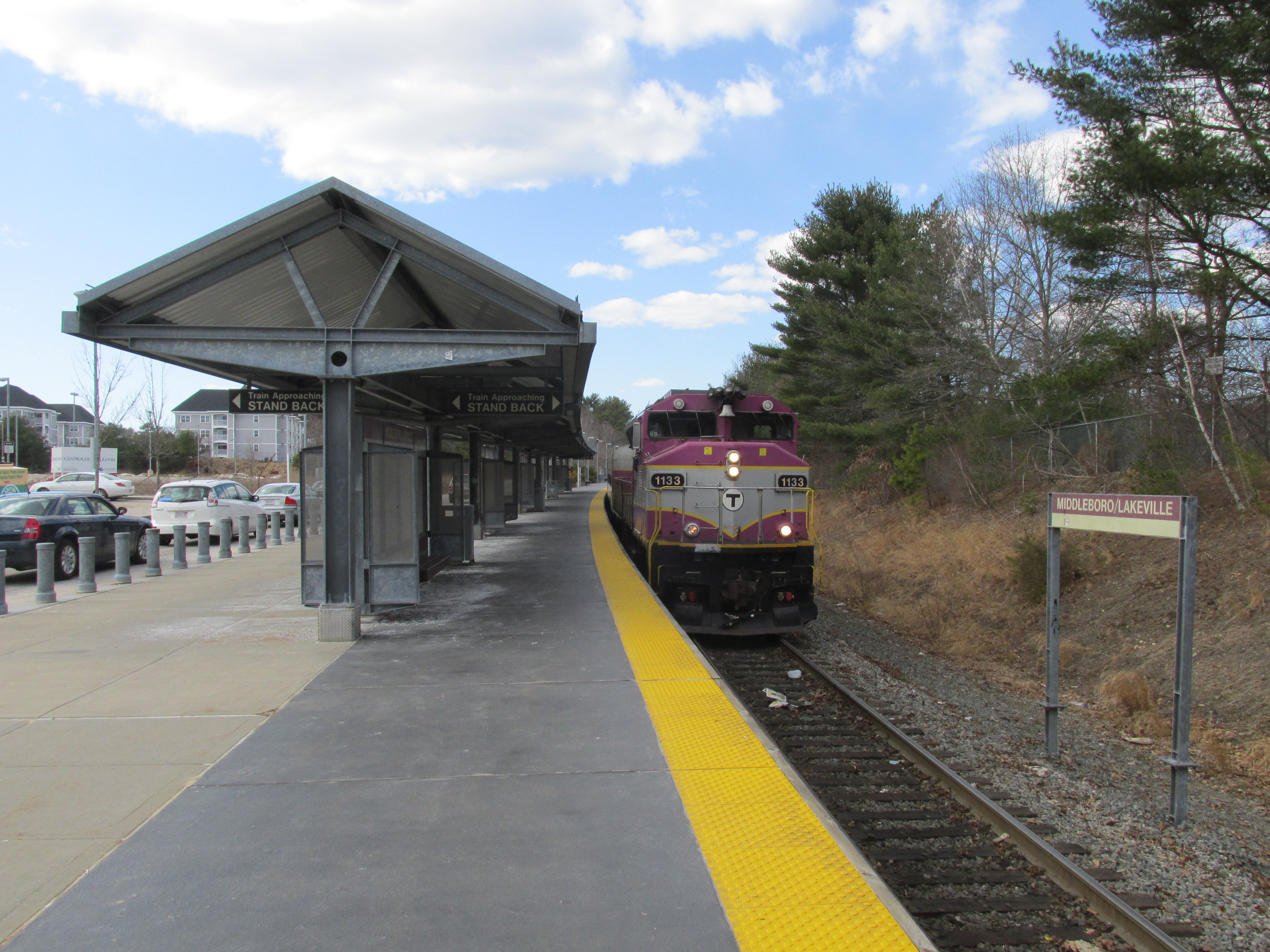
A train at Middleborough/Lakeville in 2013

In 2007, concrete ties used on the Old Colony Lines began to fail due to manufacturing errors. The rate of failures increased during the following two winters, affecting service and causing speed restrictions. In 2010, the MBTA began a project to replace the 150,000 failing ties, which were part of a batch of 600,000 made in the 1990s, with wooden ties. (Note: Amtrak and the Long Island Rail Road also had to replace large numbers of ties from that batch.) Some replacement work in Bridgewater and Middleborough took place in 2010. Midday service on the Middleborough/Lakeville Line was replaced by buses from March 14 to June 6, 2011. Weekend service on the line was replaced from March 26 to December 18, 2011, and March 17 to April 22, 2012. The project was completed in May 2012 at a cost of $91.5 million.

On May 24, 2013, the MBTA began operating CapeFlyer service between Boston and Hyannis over the Middleborough Main Line and Cape Main Line. Service consisted of one daily round trip on Friday evenings, Saturdays, and Sundays during the summer tourist season. (Note: For the 2013 season, the service ran until Columbus Day weekend in mid-October.) In 2013 and 2014, the Friday evening southbound train operated as an extension of a regular Middleborough/Lakeville Line train, while Saturday and Sunday service operated with a separate trainset. In 2015, Friday CapeFlyer service also began using a separate trainset.

Substantially reduced schedules were in effect on the Commuter Rail system from March 16 to June 23, 2020, due to the COVID-19 pandemic. Schedule changes effective November 2, 2020, added midday service with consistent 60-to-70-minute midday headways on the Middleborough/Lakeville Line, though a pilot of late-night service was discontinued. Temporary reduced schedules were again put into place from December 14, 2020, to April 5, 2021. By October 2022, Middleborough/Lakeville service was at 77% of pre-COVID ridership.

=== South Coast Rail ===
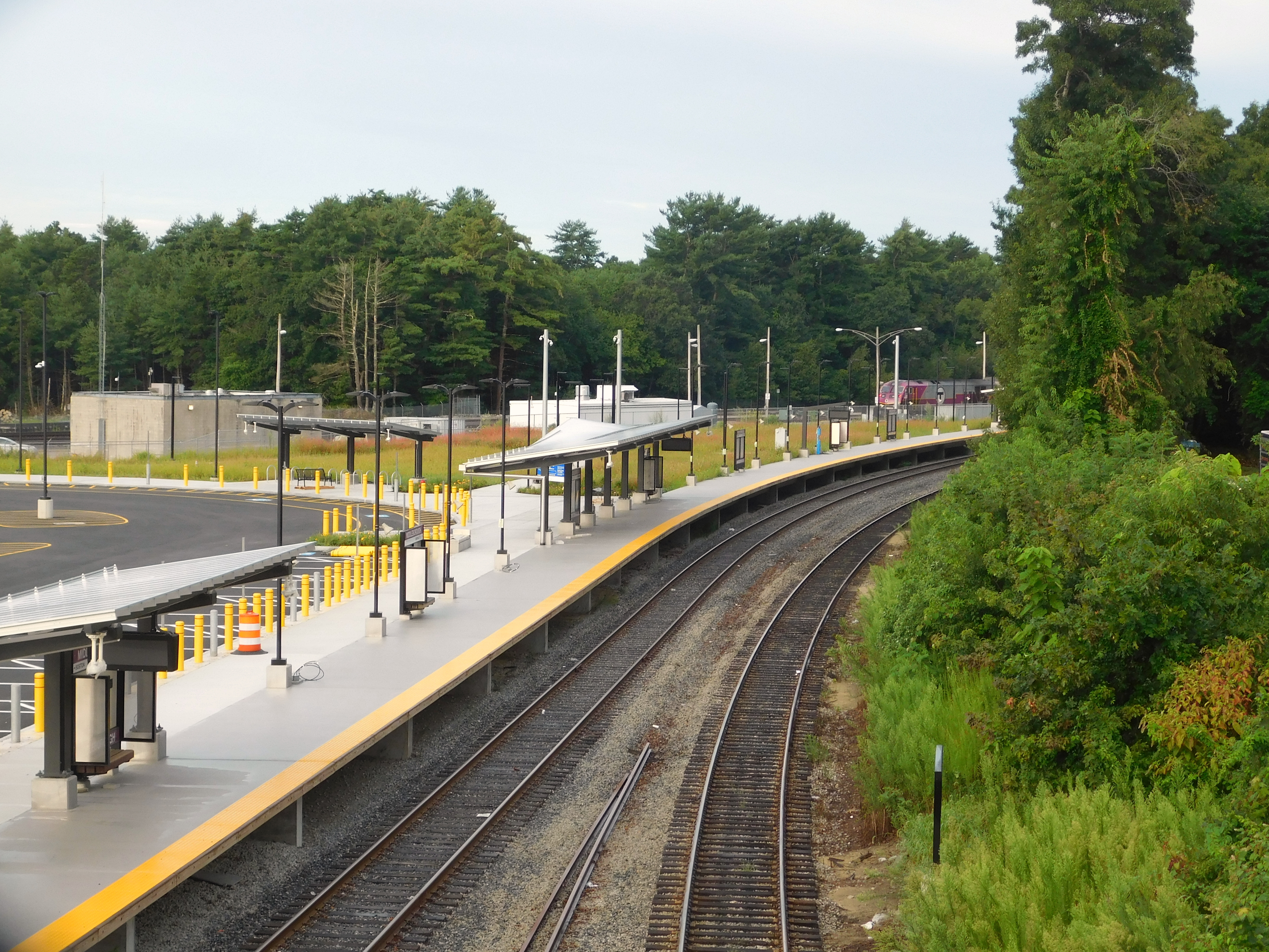
Middleborough station near completion in August 2023

In the 1980s — during the first expansion of commuter rail service in Massachusetts in decades — the restoration of service to New Bedford and Fall River (South Coast Rail) was proposed. Three routes were considered, including the Middleborough Main Line and Middleborough Secondary. By 1988, the MBTA was tentatively planning to use a route via Stoughton. A 1995 feasibility study found that the limited capacity of the single track between Boston and Braintree could only support service to Fall River or New Bedford, but not both. Planning for the Stoughton route continued until it was suspended in 2003. Planning restarted several years later. The 2009 alternatives analysis report, 2011 draft environmental impact statement, and 2013 final environmental impact statement all chose the Stoughton route.

In June 2016, the MBTA announced that the project cost had been revised to $3.42 billion, with completion not expected until 2030. The substantial delay and increase in cost caused officials to consider alternate plans, including an interim service to New Bedford via Middleborough. Some local and regional officials objected to that plan, as it would have reduced service to Middleborough/Lakeville station and potentially interfered with Plymouth/Kingston Line and Greenbush Line service. In March 2017, the state announced a revised plan intended to provide service sooner for a total cost of $3.42 billion. The $1.1 billion Phase 1 would follow the Middleborough route and open in 2024 with service to both Fall River and New Bedford. Phase 2 would follow the Stoughton route (including electrification) and open in 2029. Middleborough and Lakeville officials were critical of the possibility of abandoning Middleborough/Lakeville station — which had attracted transit-oriented development — or requiring its riders to take a shuttle train.

By June 2017, the Phase 1 completion date was moved to 2022. The draft supplemental environmental impact report was issued in January 2018. It analyzed three options for Middleborough: a reverse move to serve the existing station, a new Middleborough station with a rail shuttle between the existing station and Bridgewater, and a new Middleborough station with a bus shuttle from the developments at the existing station site. The third option was chosen for higher operational flexibility, lower travel times, and avoiding the need to add double track between Middleborough and Bridgewater.

The two main construction contracts for the project were awarded in May and August 2020. By then, service was expected to begin in late 2023. Overall project completion reached the halfway point in mid-2022. In September 2023, the MBTA indicated that revenue service would not begin until mid-2024. In April 2024, the MBTA acknowledged that a midyear opening was unlikely but did not provide a new schedule. In June 2024, the MBTA announced that the planned opening had been delayed again to May 2025. Service began on March 24, 2025. The line was renamed as the Fall River/New Bedford Line at that time. Weekday service on the main portion of the line increased from 14 round trips to 16; weekend service increased from 10 round trips to 13.

The months after the extension saw several service quality issues. A shortage of rail crews caused some trains to be cancelled during the first several weekends. The MBTA preemptively replaced some trips with buses on the weekends of April 19–20 and 26–27. One third of trains were late during the first two weeks of extended service, versus one-tenth systemwide. On-time performance improved thereafter but remained below the rest of the system through April and May. The MBTA blamed "startup conditions" and difficulty coordinating trains on the mostly-single-track line for the issues. On July 21, 2025, the schedule was changed to improve reliability. This included removal of off-peak and weekend stops at JFK/UMass, removal of two late-night shuttle trains, and longer running times. By November 2025, daily ridership on the line was about 2,000 higher than a year before.

=== Cape Cod service proposals ===
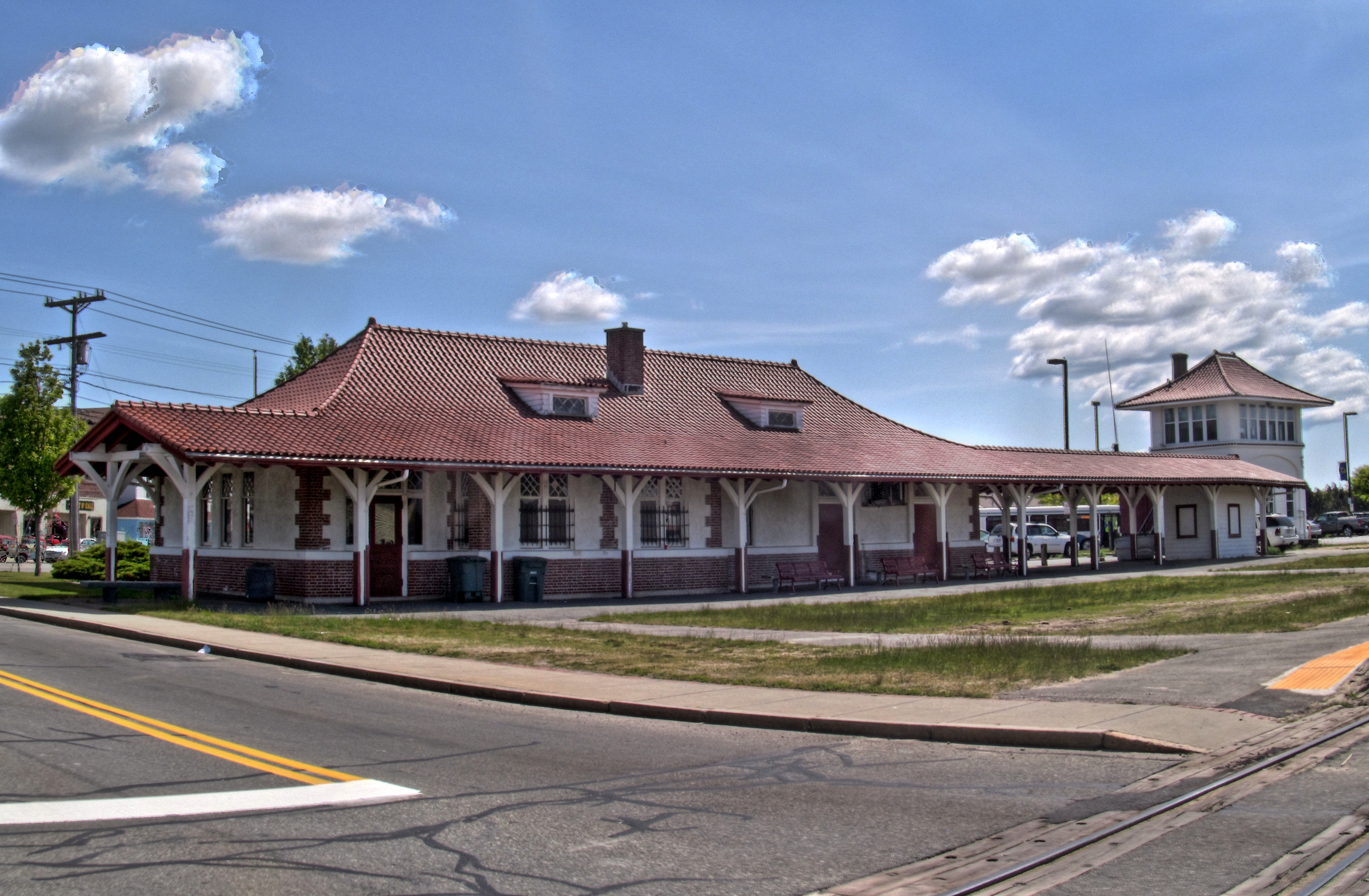
Buzzards Bay station, a possible future terminus of service

In 2007, the Boston Region Metropolitan Planning Organization released a feasibility study of extending commuter rail service to Buzzards Bay, a portion of Bourne on the north side of the Cape Cod Canal. Intermediate stops were to be at Rock Village in southern Middleborough, County Road on the Rochester/Wareham border, and downtown Wareham. The introduction of the CapeFLYER brought new attention to the possibility of extending the Middleborough/Lakeville Line to Buzzards Bay. Later in 2013, the Wareham Chamber of Commerce and Buzzards Bay town selectmen both indicated support for Buzzards Bay commuter rail based on the success of the CapeFLYER, the Chamber supported the extension of commuter rail service to Buzzards Bay station.

MassDOT and the Cape Cod Commission both studied the potential service in 2014–15. The studies estimated daily ridership of 800 to 875 if all Middleborough/Lakeville trains were extended to Buzzards Bay without intermediate stops. Bourne voted to join the MBTA district in 2015 and began paying an assessment in mid-2016, although there was no guarantee that commuter rail service would be provided. MassDOT began planning a possible trial service in October 2015. The service was to have shuttle trains between Bourne and Middleborough/Lakeville operated by Massachusetts Coastal Railroad. The MBTA Fiscal Management and Control Board rejected the service proposal in April 2016.

During the South Coast Rail project, Middleborough station was designed with space for a shuttle platform to be added later. In 2021, MassDOT released a feasibility study of Cape Cod commuter rail service. Middleborough–Buzzards Bay shuttle service with seven daily round trips was expected to have 1,710 total daily boardings, while Middleborough–Bourne service with ten daily round trips (including two off-peak Boston round trips) was expected to have 2,540 total daily boardings. Service to Hyannis was not evaluated because the Bourne–Hyannis segment would require significant track and signal improvements to be suitable for commuter service.

== Stations ==
Stations
Fare zone	Location	Miles (km)	Station	Connections and notes
1A	Boston	0.0 (0.0)	South Station	Amtrak: Acela, Lake Shore Limited, Northeast Regional; MBTA Commuter Rail: Fairmount Line, Framingham/Worcester Line, Franklin/Foxboro Line, Greenbush Line, Kingston Line, Needham Line, Providence/Stoughton Line, CapeFlyer (seasonal); MBTA subway: Red Line, Silver Line (SL1, SL2, SL3, SL4); MBTA bus: 4, 7, 11; Intercity buses at South Station Bus Terminal
1A	Boston	2.3 (3.7)	JFK/UMass	MBTA Commuter Rail: Greenbush Line, Kingston Line; MBTA subway: Red Line; MBTA bus: 8, 16, 41; UMass Boston shuttle
1	Quincy	7.9 (12.7)	Quincy Center	MBTA Commuter Rail: Greenbush Line, Kingston Line; MBTA subway: Red Line; MBTA bus: 210, 211, 215, 216, 217, 220, 222, 225, 230, 236, 238, 245
2	Braintree	10.9 (17.5)	Braintree	MBTA Commuter Rail: Kingston Line, CapeFlyer (seasonal); MBTA subway: Red Line; MBTA bus: 226, 230, 236
3	Randolph	15.0 (24.1)	Holbrook/Randolph	MBTA bus: 238, 240
4	Brockton	18.6 (29.9)	Montello	MBTA bus: 230; BAT: 10/11
4	Brockton	20.0 (32.2)	Brockton	MBTA Commuter Rail: CapeFlyer (seasonal); BAT: 1, 2, 3, 4, 4A, 5, 6, 8, 9, 10/11, 12, 13, 14, BSU 28; GATRA: Gateway Link
5	Brockton	21.9 (35.2)	Campello	BAT: 8, 12
6	Bridgewater	27.7 (44.6)	Bridgewater	
8	Lakeville	35.6 (57.3)	Lakeville	Station closed for commuter rail service on March 24, 2025; still used for seasonal CapeFlyer service
8	Middleborough	34.5 (55.5)	Middleborough	GATRA: Downtown Middleborough Shuttle, Link 4
8	Taunton	42.8 (68.9)	East Taunton	GATRA: 8
Fall River Branch
8	Freetown	51.2 (82.4)	Freetown	
8	Fall River	56.6 (91.1)	Fall River	SRTA: 102
New Bedford Branch
8	New Bedford	57.4 (92.4)	Church Street	
8	New Bedford	60.0 (96.6)	New Bedford	SRTA: 202, 204, 211
Closed stations
