= Plymouth station (MBTA) =

Former railway station in Plymouth, Massachusetts

Plymouth
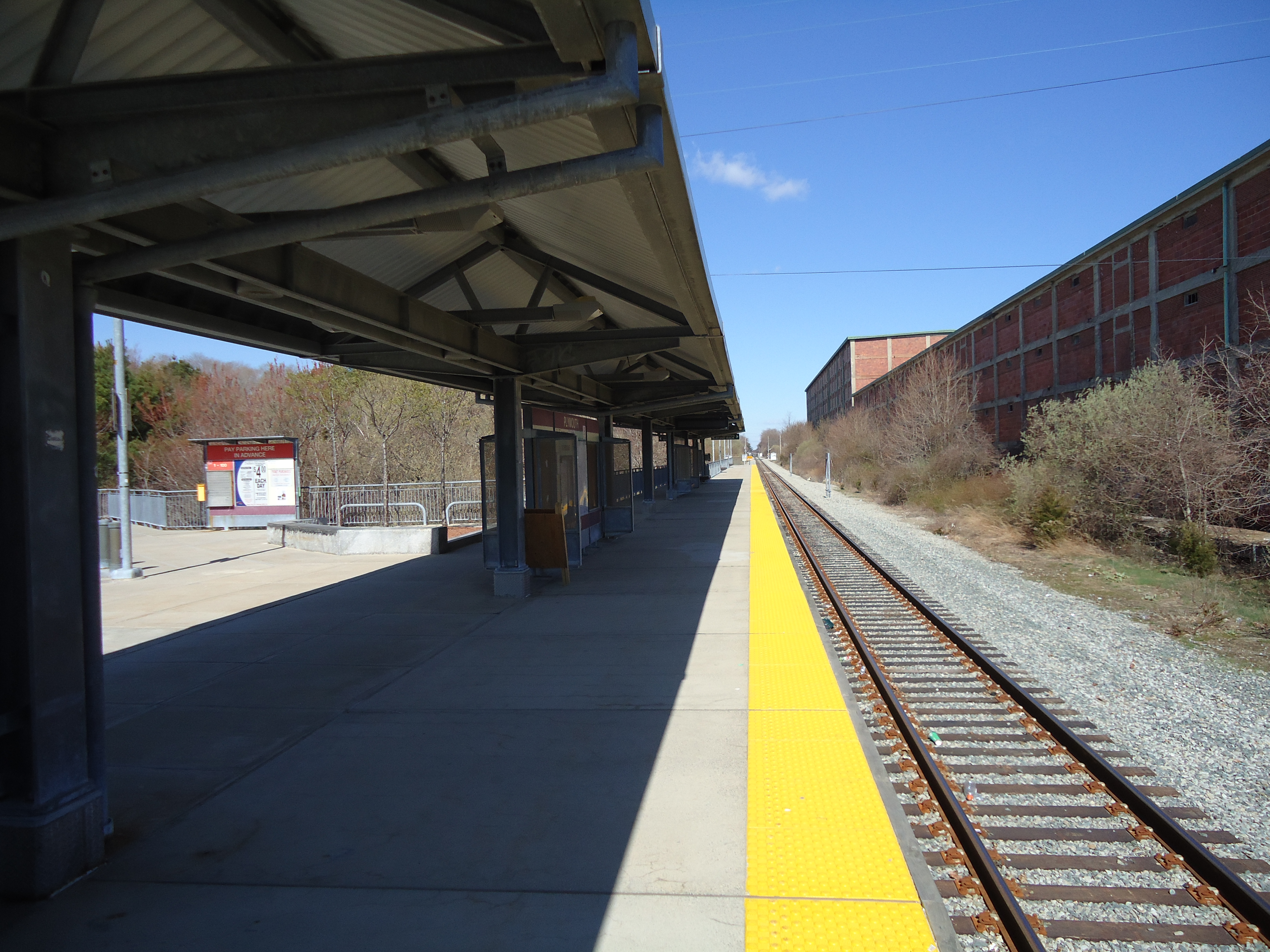
- Plymouth station in April 2010

General information
- Location: Loring Boulevard at Cordage Park Circle; Plymouth, Massachusetts
- Coordinates: 41.9812°N 70.6903°W
- Line: Plymouth Branch
- Platforms: 1 side platform
- Tracks: 1
- Connections: GATRA: Freedom Link, Liberty Link

Construction
- Parking: 96 spaces ($4.00 fee)
- Cycle facilities: 8 spaces
- Accessible: Yes

Other information
- Fare zone: 8

History
- Opened: November 29, 1997
- Closed: June 30, 1959 (former station); April 5, 2021 (suspension; modern station)
- Former names: North Plymouth (1873–c. 1880); Seaside (c. 1880–January 1925); Cordage (January 1925–June 30, 1959)

Passengers
- 2018: 21 daily boardings

Services
Preceding station	MBTA	Following station
Halifax toward South Station	Kingston Line	Terminus
Former services
Preceding station	New York, New Haven and Hartford Railroad	Following station
Cordage station
Kingston toward Boston	Boston–Plymouth	Plymouth Terminus
Kingston toward Boston	South Shore Line Service ended 1938	Plymouth Terminus
Plymouth station
Cordage toward Boston	Boston–Plymouth	Terminus
Cordage toward Boston	South Shore Line Service ended 1938	Terminus
Darby toward Middleborough	Plymouth and Middleborough Branch Service ended 1927	Terminus
Location

Plymouth station is a closed MBTA Commuter Rail station in Plymouth, Massachusetts. It served the Plymouth/Kingston Line and was located in the Cordage Park complex of North Plymouth. Plymouth was one terminus of the MBTA's Plymouth/Kingston Line, along with Kingston station in nearby Kingston, Massachusetts. Plymouth station provided non-peak service to Boston's South Station, as well as some peak service, which ran in addition to peak trips to Kingston. Most trains on the line served only Kingston station; service to and ridership from Plymouth were thus very limited. Due to this limited ridership and service, as well as due to the fact that trains had to reverse in and out of the station in order to serve it, Plymouth station was indefinitely closed in April 2021.

== History ==
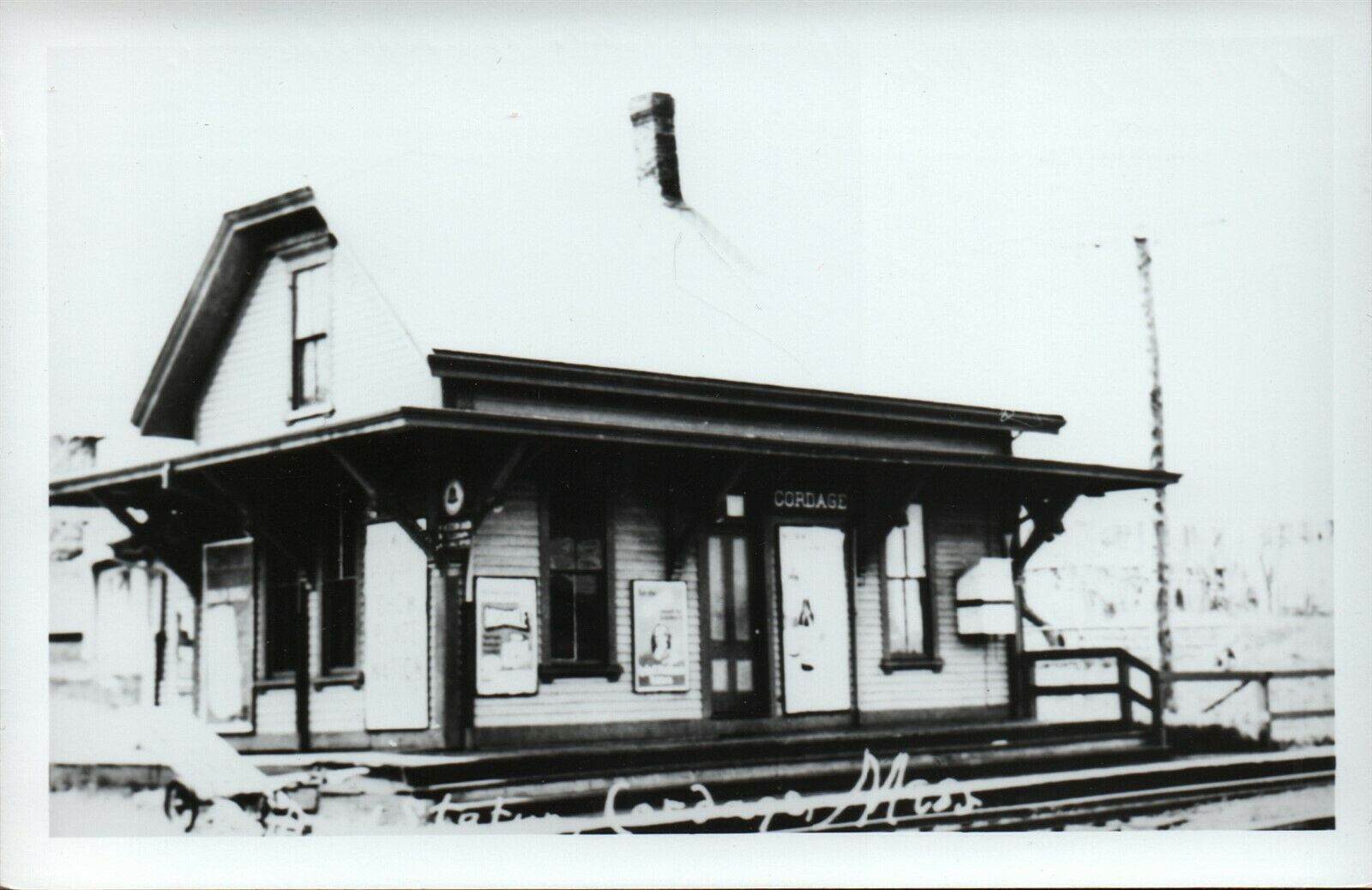
Cordage station in 1930

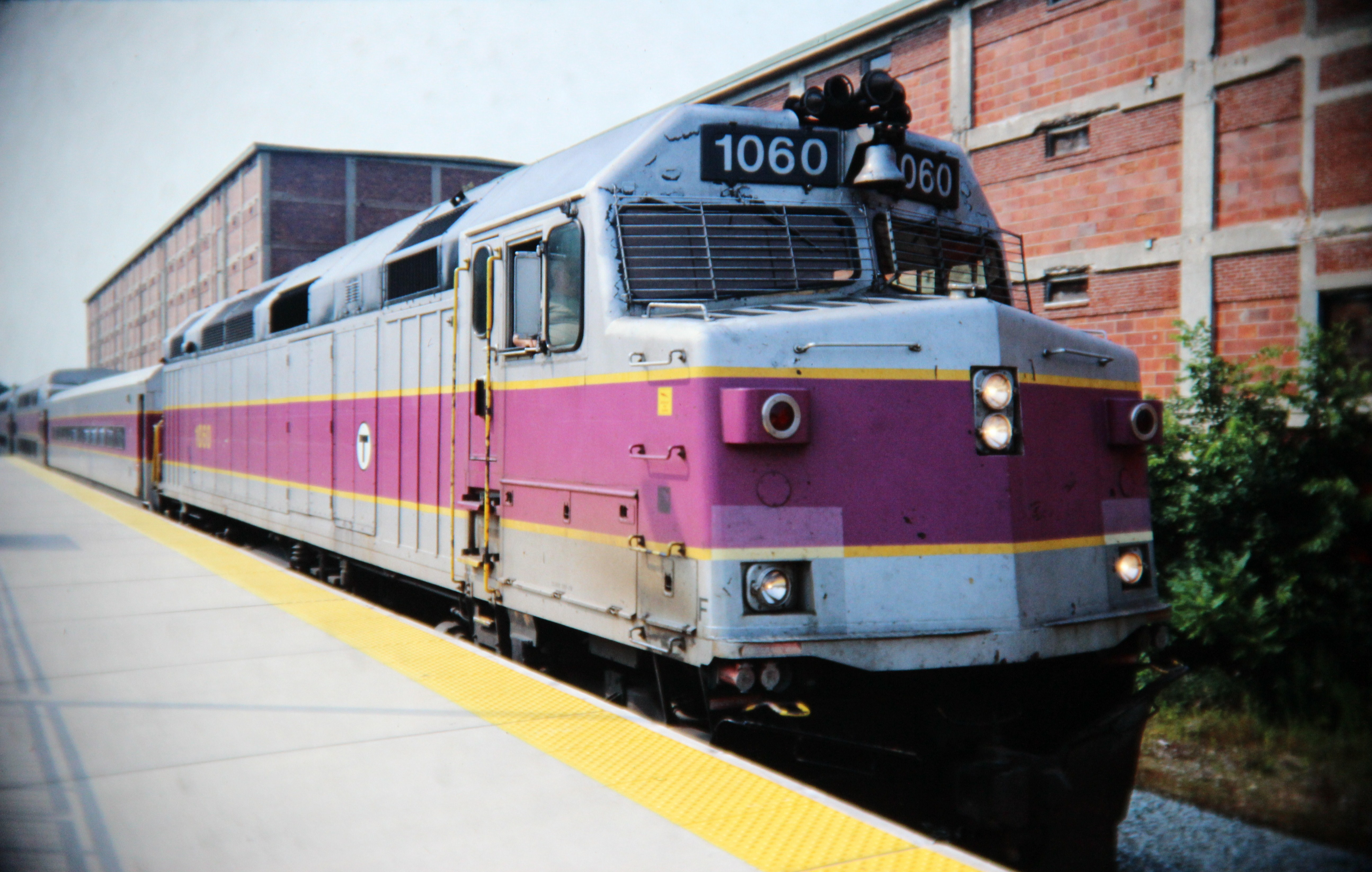
A train at Plymouth station in August 2001

A previous station was located at Boundary Lane on the Plymouth/Kingston border, just north of the current site. Built as North Plymouth in 1873, it was renamed to Seaside around 1880 and Cordage in January 1925. A new freight house was built in 1881. The station closed with the rest of the Old Colony Division passenger rail service in southeastern Massachusetts on June 30, 1959.

Because Plymouth did not want trains running through upscale residential areas near the downtown area, Plymouth station is located in Cordage Park, a commercial and light industrial park in North Plymouth. The rest of the Plymouth/Kingston Line and the Middleborough/Lakeville Line opened for rush hour service on September 29, 1997. Plymouth, with no rush hour trains, did not open until midday and weekend service began on November 29, 1997. The station was closed from November 3 to December 23, 2010, during tie replacement on the line.

Due to a FY 2013 budget shortfall and claims of low ridership by the MBTA, weekend service to the South Shore (and two other lines) was discontinued in July 2012. MassDOT and the MBTA subsequently received substantial feedback from rail commuters and legislative representatives to reinstate weekend service to those lines. In 2014, funding was reallocated to the FY 2015 state budget (for a trial period) and weekend service resumed on the (formerly) suspended lines on December 27, 2014. Prior to the return of weekend service on the Kingston/Plymouth Line, the MBTA held special weekend service to Plymouth for 2 weekends leading up to the 2014 Thanksgiving holiday. The two trains per day were intended only for tourists going to Plymouth; they did not run on schedules allowing day trips to Boston.

The fork at the end of the line created operational issues - a single train could not serve both terminal stations efficiently. Three daily trips ran to both Kingston and Plymouth sequentially, which doubles travel time from Kingston to Boston during much of the day (Kingston was first on all weekday trips and one weekend trip). Between Kingston and Plymouth, trains simultaneously acted as inbound trains (from the first station to Boston) and outbound trains (from Boston to the second station). Keolis and the MBTA planned to address the unusual routing during schedule changes in late 2015, but did not do so.

The station was indefinitely closed in April 2021 along with four other low-ridership stations. In June 2021, the MBTA indicated that the station would reopen on July 5, 2022 (the start of a new fiscal year). However, due to budget cuts, this service restoration did not occur as planned, with no certain date for resumption of service announced by that time.
