= Kingston station (Massachusetts) =

Railway station in Kingston, Massachusetts, US

Kingston
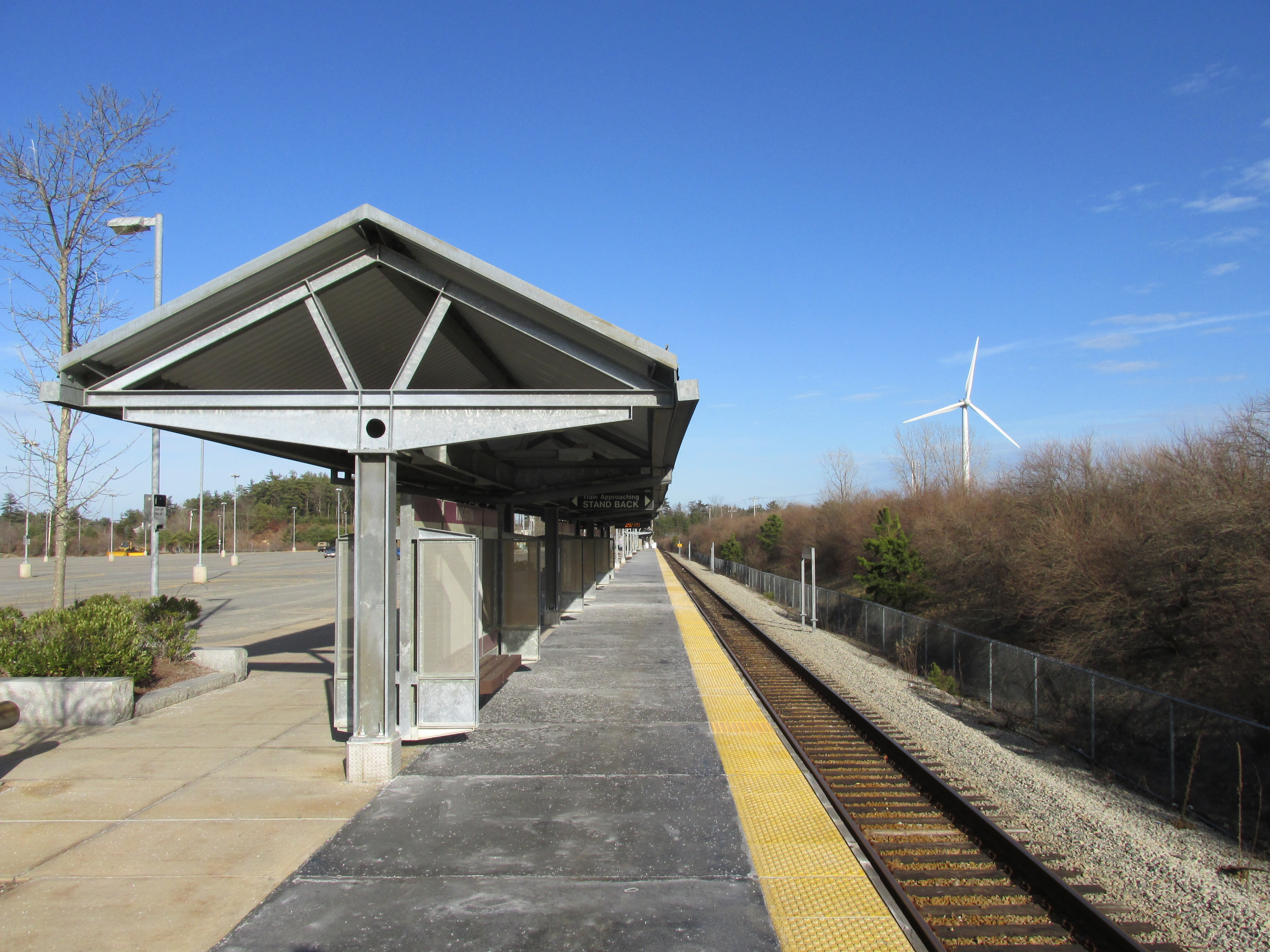
- Kingston station in January 2013

General information
- Location: 194 Marion Drive; Kingston, Massachusetts
- Coordinates: 41.9768°N 70.7233°W
- Line: Kingston Branch
- Platforms: 1 side platform
- Tracks: 1
- Connections: GATRA: Freedom Link, Liberty Link, SAIL

Construction
- Parking: 1,039 spaces ($4.00 fee)
- Accessible: Yes

Other information
- Fare zone: 8

History
- Opened: September 29, 1997

Passengers
- 2024: 634 daily boardings

Services
Preceding station	MBTA	Following station
Halifax toward South Station	Kingston Line	Terminus
Services at pre-1959 station
Preceding station	New York, New Haven and Hartford Railroad	Following station
Plympton toward Boston	Boston–Plymouth	Cordage toward Plymouth
Island Creek toward Boston	South Shore Line Service ended 1938	Cordage toward Plymouth
Location

Kingston station (formerly Kingston/Route 3) is an MBTA Commuter Rail serving the Plymouth/Kingston Line, located off of Massachusetts Route 3 south of downtown Kingston, Massachusetts. It opened in 1997. Like all stations on the line, Kingston station is fully accessible.

The station consists of a single side platform serving the single track. Marion Drive, the access road for the station parking lot, crosses the line at grade just east of the platform. The Kingston layover yard is located just west of the station.

== History ==
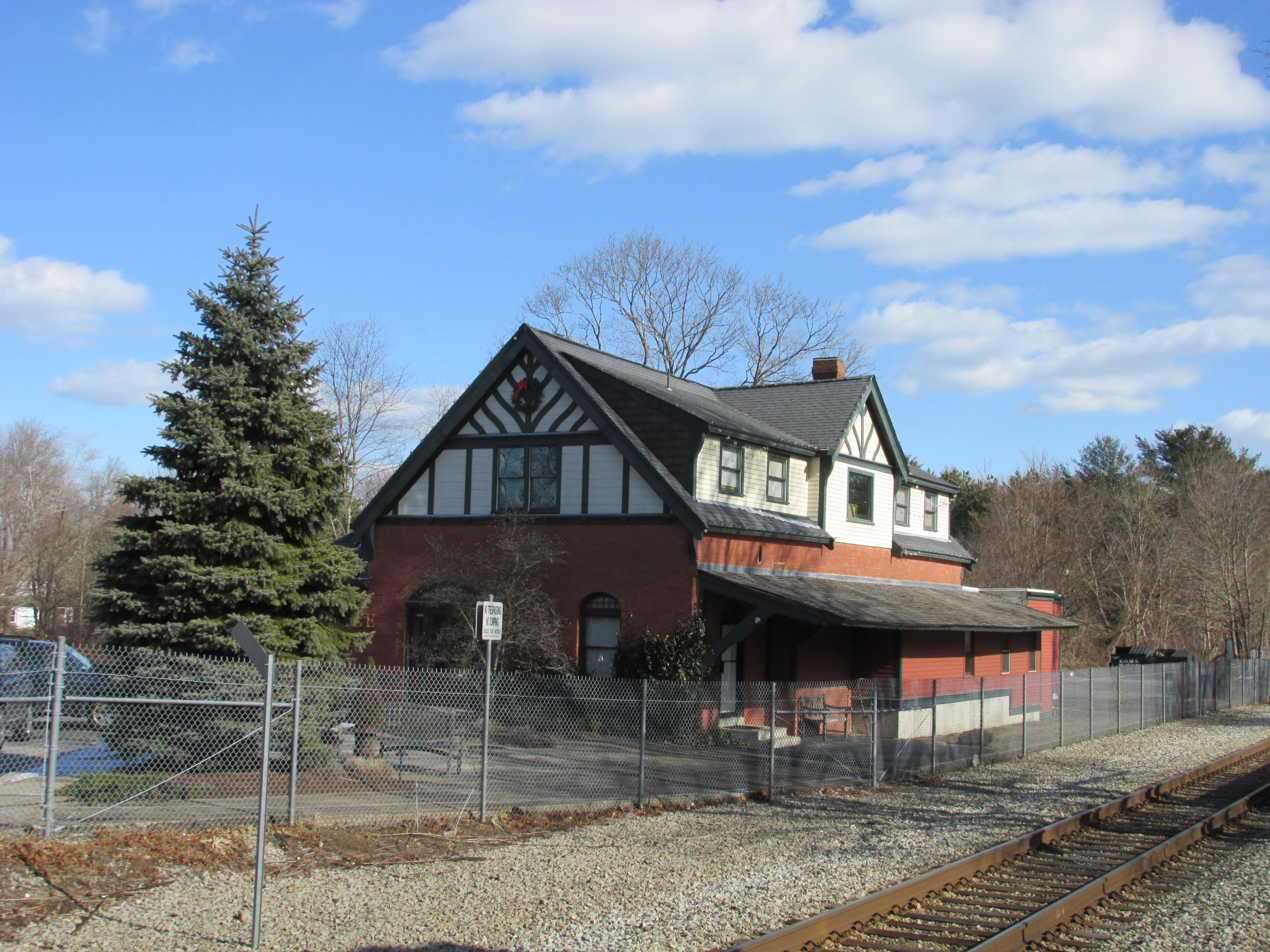
The former Kingston station, now a restaurant, in February 2013

The Old Colony Railroad's Kingston station was located in downtown Kingston off Summer Street (Route 3A). The original station was replaced in 1889. It was the southern terminus of the South Shore Line until 1938. Boston–Plymouth service ended in 1959, though the station is still extant and used as a restaurant.

The station was built to provide a park and ride station for Route 3 so that traffic to the station would not go through downtown Kingston. A completely new right of way – the first new section of mainline rail in the state since the Needham cutoff in 1906 – was constructed along Route 3 and through unused land. The spur passes under the Route 3/3A interchange in a lengthy tunnel. A layover yard for Plymouth/Kingston Line service is located just past the station. Peak service began on September 29, 1997, with off-peak and weekend service beginning on November 29.

In October 2011, the MBTA began construction of a $2.5 million wind turbine to supply energy to the station and layover facility. The 120-foot (37 m)-tall turbine, which was completed in January 2012, only produces about 60% of the energy it was expected to. The MBTA called the station "Kingston/Route 3" in some materials until around 2016.

The fork at the end of the line created operational issues – a single train cannot serve both terminal stations efficiently. Three daily trips formerly ran to both Kingston and Plymouth sequentially, which doubled travel time from Kingston to Boston during much of the day. Between Kingston and Plymouth, the train simultaneously acted as an inbound train (from the first station to Boston) and an outbound train (from Boston to the second station). Keolis and the MBTA planned to address the unusual routing during schedule changes in late 2015, but did not do so. Plymouth station was indefinitely closed on April 5, 2021, as part of service cuts, with all trains terminating at Kingston.
