= Indian Head =

Indian Head can refer to:

== Coins ==
- Indian Head cent, U.S. one cent coin (1859–1909)
- Indian Head eagle, U.S. $10 gold piece issued between 1907 and 1933
- Indian Head gold pieces, U.S. coins issued between 1908 and 1929
- Indian Head nickel, U.S. five cent coin (1913–1938)

== Communities ==
=== Canada ===
- Indian Head, Saskatchewan, a town in Canada
  - Indian Head-Milestone, the local provincial electoral district
  - Rural Municipality of Indian Head No. 156, Saskatchewan, the surrounding rural municipality

=== United States ===
Listed alphabetically by state

- Indian Head Park, Illinois, a village in Cook County
- Indian Head, Maryland, a town in Charles County
- Indian Head, Pennsylvania, an unincorporated community in Fayette County

== Geographical features ==
=== United States ===
- Indian Head Mountain (New York), one of the Catskill Mountains in Greene County, New York
- Indian Head Peak, in the Glacier Peak Wilderness in the U.S. state of Washington
- Indian Head Pond (Massachusetts), in Hanson, Massachusetts
- Indian Head River, in Massachusetts
- Indian Head Rock, a multi-ton boulder near Portsmouth, Ohio
- Mount Pemigewasset, also known as Indian Head, in New Hampshire

=== Elsewhere ===
- Badlands Guardian, a landscape in Alberta, Canada—when viewed from the air, it resembles a human head wearing a full Native American headdress
- Indian Head (Fraser Island), a headland in Australia

== Sports usage ==
"Indian Head" can also colloquially (and controversially) refer to the logos of a number of sports teams that feature(d) a stylized image of a Native American. Prominent examples include:

=== Teams ===
- Chicago Blackhawks, an American professional ice hockey team
- Florida State Seminoles, the sports teams of Florida State University
- North Dakota Fighting Sioux, the sports teams of University of North Dakota, now known as the North Dakota Fighting Hawks
- Washington Redskins, an American professional gridiron football team, now known as the Washington Commanders

=== Mascots ===
- Chief Illiniwek, former mascot of the Illinois Fighting Illini, the sports teams of the University of Illinois Urbana–Champaign
- Chief Wahoo, former logo of the Cleveland Indians professional baseball team, now known as the Cleveland Guardians

== Other uses ==
- Indian Head, Inc., onetime owner of Wayne Corporation, an American manufacturer of buses and other vehicles
- Indian Head Ginger, Costus spicatus, also known as Spiked Spirlaflag Ginger
- Indian Head Highway, Route 210 in the U.S. state of Maryland
- Indian Head Naval Surface Warfare Center, in Charles County, Maryland
- Indian-head test pattern, an American television test pattern
- 2nd Infantry Division "Indianhead", a division of the United States Army

== See also ==
- Indianhead (disambiguation)
