= Adams Square =

Adams Square may refer to:

- Adams Square (Boston), Boston, Massachusetts
  - Adams Square station, a nearby railroad station
- Adams Square, Glendale, California
