= Indianhead =

Indianhead may refer to:

- Indianhead Mountain, a mountain in the Upper Peninsula of Michigan, United States
- Wisconsin Indianhead Technical College, a two-year college with four campuses in Wisconsin: Ashland, New Richmond, Rice Lake, and Superior
- Indianhead International School, a school in Howon-Dong, Uijeongbu, South Korea
- Indianhead Council, the former name of the Northern Star Council
- Indianhead Ski Area, an area of Geneva Basin Ski Area
- Indianhead Poker, an alternate name for the poker game Blind man's bluff
- Indianhead bow, a McManus bow

== See also ==
- Indian Head (disambiguation)
