= Maquan Pond =

Lake of the United States of America

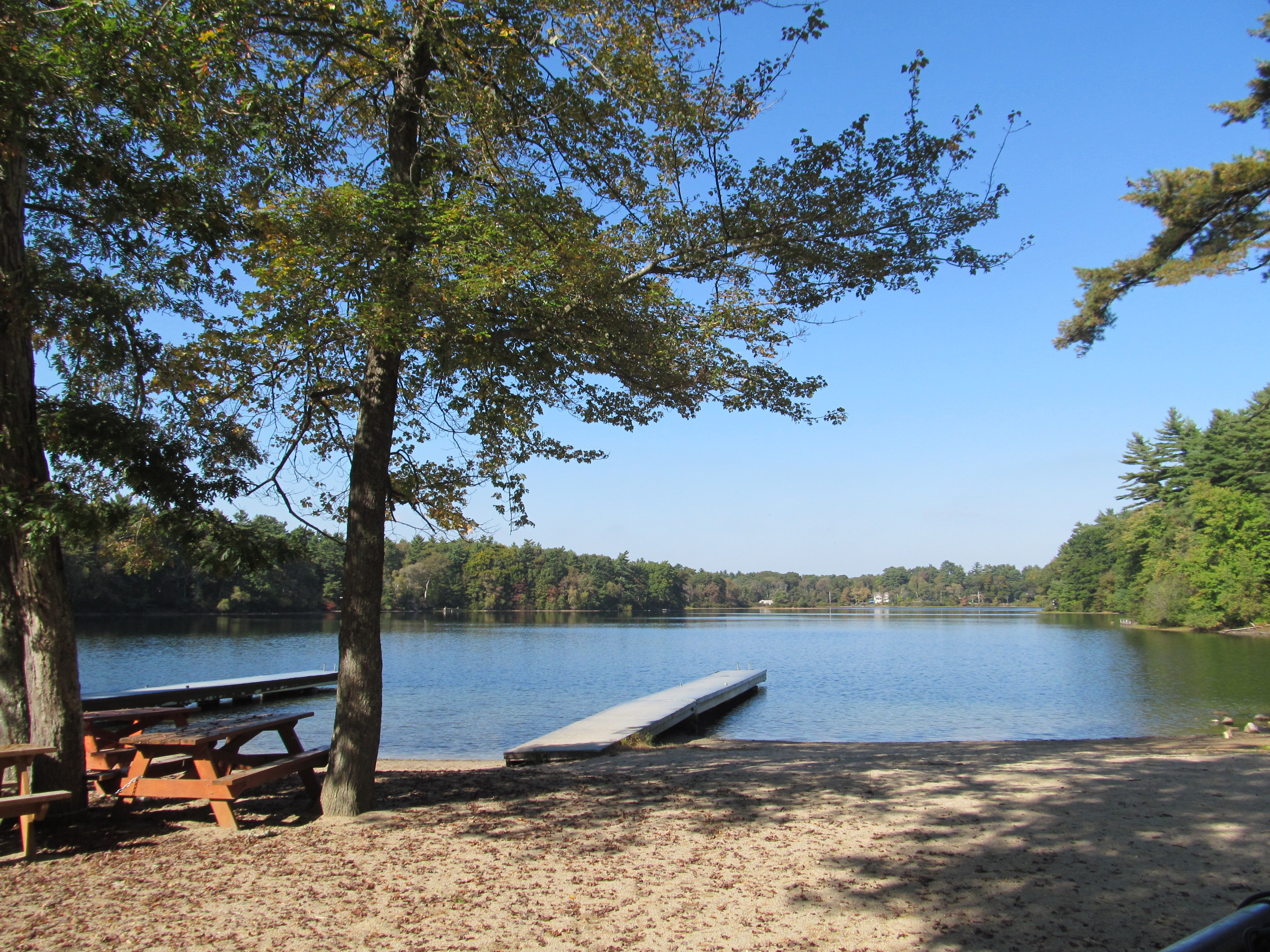
- Maquan Pond

- Location within Massachusetts
- Location: Hanson, Massachusetts
- Coordinates: 42°03′38″N 70°51′05″W
- Basin countries: United States
- Surface area: 48 acres (19 ha)
- Average depth: 12 ft (3.7 m)
- Max. depth: 18 ft (5.5 m)

Maquan Pond is a 48-acre (190,000 m^{2}) pond in Hanson, Massachusetts. Its average depth is 12 feet (3.7 m) and its maximum depth is 18 feet (5.5 m). The pond is spring fed with an overflow on the south end that feeds into Indian Head Pond. The town has a right-of-way on the northern shore of the pond off Maquan Street (Route 14). The town beach, Cranberry Cove, is at south end of the pond.

Camp Kiwanee, a former Camp Fire camp, is located on the southeastern shore of the pond.
