= Burrage Mansion =

Historic house in California, United States

- Burrage Mansion in 1901
- Interactive map of the Burrage Mansion area
- Former names: Monte Vista
- Alternative names: Queen of the Missions

General information
- Architectural style: Mission Revival
- Location: 1205 West Crescent Avenue; Redlands, California 92373
- Coordinates: 34°1′47.0″N 117°11′08.2″W
- Construction started: 1900
- Completed: 1901
- Renovated: 2008
- Cost: $17,000
- Client: Albert Cameron Burrage

Technical details
- Floor count: 3
- Floor area: 16,000 square feet (1,500 m^{2})

Design and construction
- Architect: Charles Brigham

The Burrage Mansion (historically known as Monte Vista) is a historic 16,000-square-foot estate located in Redlands, California. Built in 1901 by wealthy Boston lawyer and industrialist Albert Cameron Burrage, the mansion is recognized as a textbook example of Mission Revival architecture in Southern California. Over its history, the estate has transitioned from an exclusive winter playground for Gilded Age aristocrats to a Catholic convent, and ultimately to a dedicated sanctuary and recreation center for disadvantaged children.

== History ==
In the late 19th and early 20th centuries, Redlands became a prominent winter destination for wealthy East Coast industrialists due to its temperate climate and thriving citrus industry. Albert Cameron Burrage, a successful businessman with significant interests in Standard Oil and Amalgamated Copper, commissioned the estate to serve as a winter holiday home to entertain fellow aristocrats. Construction began in 1900 and was completed in 1901. The family spent only a few winters at the estate, known then as "Monte Vista," dazzling the local community with their vast wealth before largely abandoning their seasonal visits.

The Burrage Mansion was designed by the prominent Boston architectural firm Brigham & Spofford (headed by architect Charles Brigham). The main house spans approximately 16,000 square feet and sits on a 20-acre elevated parcel on a knoll above Crescent Avenue near Smiley Heights. Designed in a distinct U-shape layout, it is celebrated as an exemplary specimen of the Mission Revival style, incorporating two prominent Moorish-style dome towers that dominate the structure. It also incorporates scalloped gabled parapets, arched colonnades with brick porches supported by pillars into its original design. Additionally, terraced grounds were landscaped with dense orange groves, exotic trees, stone walkways, and expansive views of the San Bernardino Mountains. The estate also features an accompanying carriage house and a separate caretaker's cottage.

=== Religious and Institutional Use (1934–1974) ===
Following the passing of the original owners, the estate entered a new chapter. In 1934, the property was acquired by Catholic organizations. The Sisters of Mercy lived at the mansion from 1934 until 1974. Additionally, the estate served as a convent for the Our Lady of Victory Missionary Sisters (known as the Victory Noll Sisters). For several decades, the former elite playground functioned as a quiet, reflective spiritual property named "Queen of the Missions".

=== Rochford Foundation Era (2007–Present) ===
After the nuns vacated the estate in 1974, the property cycled through a few private owners and families. During the late 20th century, the home faced periods of relative neglect and was subject to local zoning controversies and neighborhood disputes regarding its potential commercial use and event hosting. In 2007, the property was purchased by Redlands native Tim Rochford. Under the stewardship of the Rochford Foundation, the mansion underwent extensive restoration. Rather than serving as a private residence, the estate was repurposed as a secure "haven of play and enrichment" for disadvantaged and special-needs children. Today, it hosts youth-centric programs, educational group outings, and charitable events.

== Gallery ==
Post Card from 1930.

Photo from 1900.

Front entrance in 1904

== See also ==
- Auerbacher Home
- Barton Villa
- Beverly Ranch
- Kimberly Crest
- Morey Mansion
