= Great Sandy Bottom Pond =

- Location within Massachusetts Location within the United States
- Location: Pembroke, Massachusetts
- Coordinates: 42°03′08″N 70°49′50″W
- Type: reservoir
- Basin countries: United States
- Surface area: 109 acres (44 ha)
- Surface elevation: 52 ft (16 m)

Great Sandy Bottom Pond is a 109-acre (0.44 km^{2}) reservoir in Pembroke, Massachusetts. The reservoir is located south of Oldham Pond and Furnace Pond, and north of Little Sandy Bottom Pond. The reservoir is a Class A public water supply for the Abington/Rockland Joint Water Works.
