= Charles Brigham =

American architect

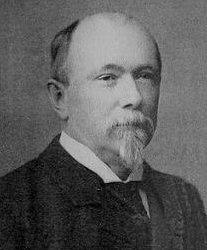
- Brigham in 1907
- Born: June 21, 1841; Watertown, Massachusetts
- Died: July 1925 (aged 84)
- Occupation: Architect

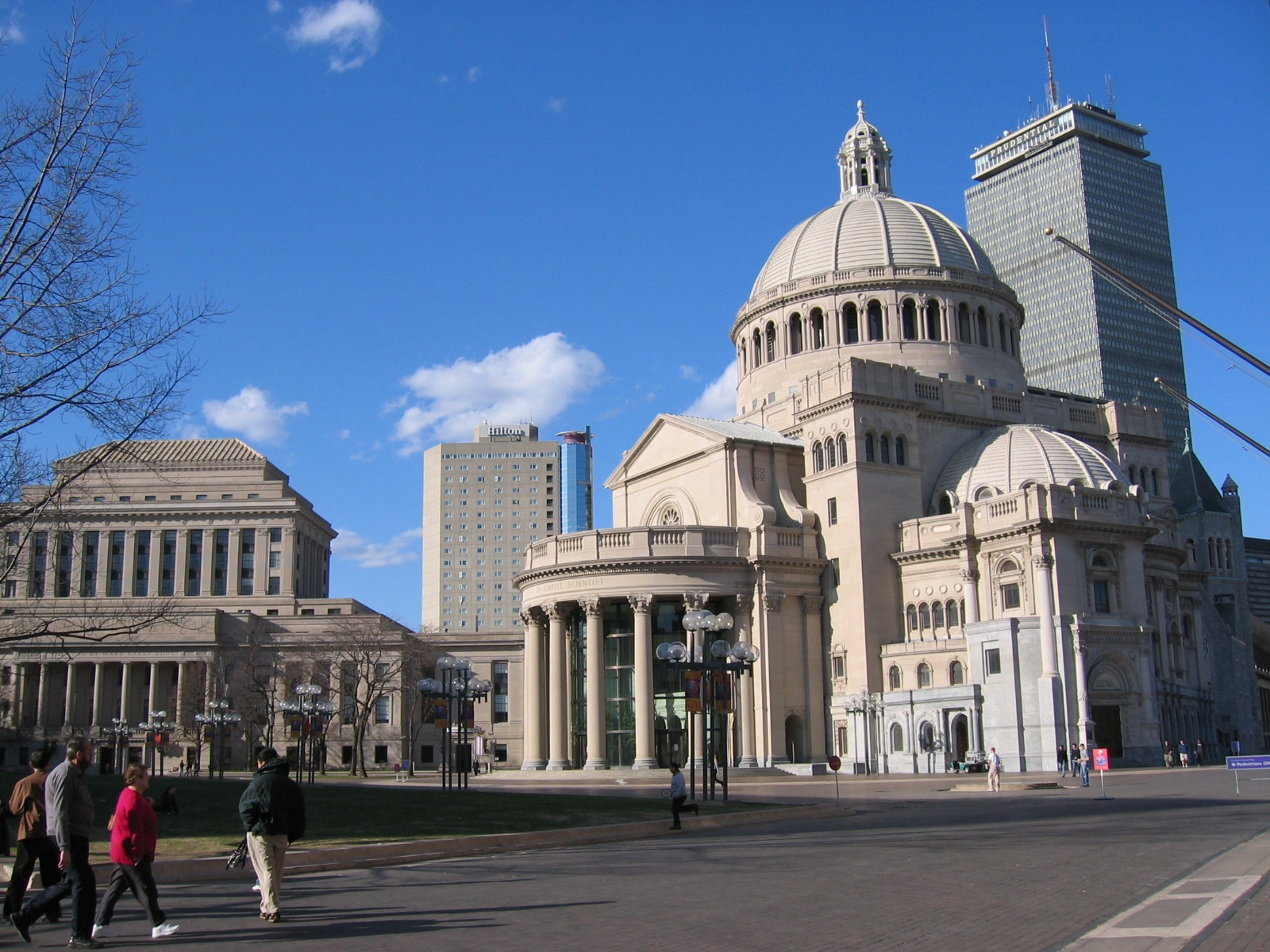
The First Church of Christ, Scientist, Boston, 1906

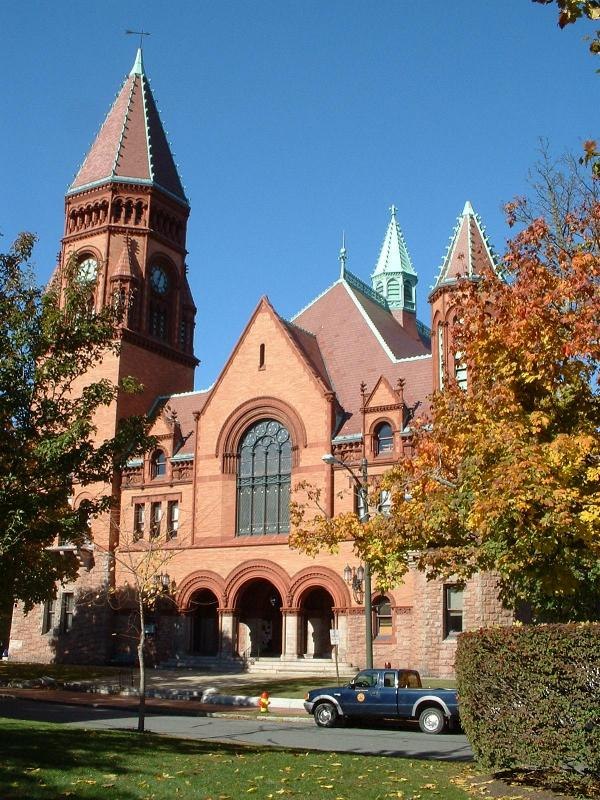
Fairhaven Town Hall, Fairhaven, Massachusetts, 1892

Charles Brigham (June 21, 1841 – July 1925) was an American architect based in Boston, Massachusetts.

== Life ==
Brigham was born, raised, and educated in Watertown, Massachusetts schools and graduated at age 15 in 1856 in the first class of Watertown High School. He had no formal education in architecture.

He apprenticed to Calvin Ryder and later to Boston architect Gridley J.F. Bryant. Brigham served as a sergeant in the Union Army during the American Civil War, then returned to working with Bryant. In 1866, Brigham and John Hubbard Sturgis formed a partnership which lasted 20 year. In that times the firm was recognized for its innovative and groundbreaking designs, including the original building for the Boston Museum of Fine Arts, located in Copley Square.

Brigham subsequently designed the 1898 annex to the Massachusetts State House in Boston, the 1906 The First Church of Christ, Scientist in Boston, and many residential buildings especially in the Boston Back Bay and Newport, Rhode Island.

Brigham's work reflects the eclecticism and historicism prevalent in the last quarter of the 19th century, initiating fusion of the complex eclectic references of the English Queen Anne revival with American colonial design. The resulting coastal New England houses of the 1880s by Brigham and other Boston architects defined the shingle style in one of the most original and distinguished epochs of American architectural history, from which other notable architects, such as Henry Hobson Richardson, emerged. He also designed the Watertown town seal.

== Work ==
=== With John Hubbard Sturgis ===
- Codman Building, Boston, 1873
- Church of the Advent, Boston, 1875–1888
- Museum of Fine Arts, Boston, 1876
- 86 Marlborough Street, Boston 1872

=== In solo practice ===
- Trinity Episcopal Church (Melrose, Massachusetts), 1886
- Hollis Hunnewell Cottage, Wellesley, Massachusetts, 1869
- Stoughton (MBTA station), Stoughton, Massachusetts, 1888
- Unitarian Building, First Parish of Watertown, Massachusetts, 1889
- Fairhaven Town Hall, Fairhaven, Massachusetts, 1892
- Millicent Library, Fairhaven, Massachusetts, 1893
- Annex to the Massachusetts State House in Boston, 1895
- New Bedford Institution for Savings, New Bedford, Massachusetts, 1897
- Scollay Square and Adams Square station entrances, 1898
- Albert C. Burrage House, Back Bay, Boston, 1899; designated as a Boston Landmark by the Boston Landmarks Commission in 2003
- Albert C. Burrage House, 1205 West Crescent Avenue, Redlands, California, 1899/1900
- Madison Public Library, now the Museum of Early Trades and Crafts, Madison, New Jersey, 1900
- Unitarian Memorial Church, Fairhaven, Massachusetts, 1901
- Fairhaven High School, Fairhaven, Massachusetts, 1905
- Messiah Home for Children, The Bronx, New York City, 1905–19hool
- Old Watertown High School, Watertown, Massachusetts, 1913
- St. Mark the Evangelist Church, Dorchester, Massachusetts
- St. Francis of Assisi Church, Braintree, Massachusetts
