= Trinity Episcopal Church (Melrose, Massachusetts) =

Historic church in Massachusetts, United States

- U.S. National Register of Historic Places
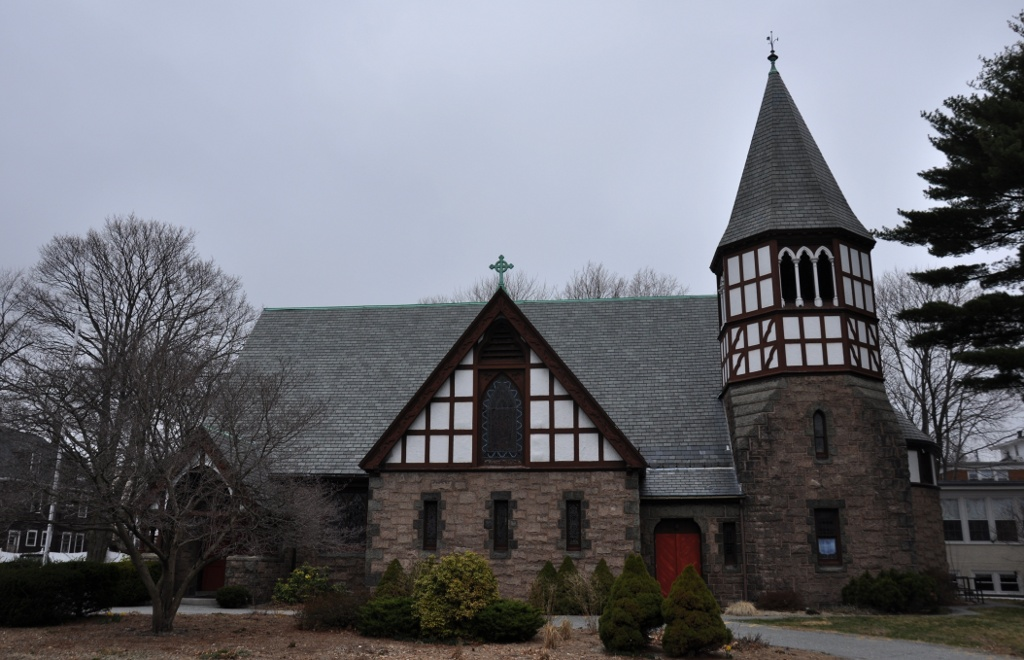

- Location within Massachusetts Location within the United States
- Location: Melrose, Massachusetts
- Coordinates: 42°27′34″N 71°04′07″W
- Built: 1886
- Architect: Charles Brigham; Smith, William
- Architectural style: Late 19th And 20th Century Revivals, Shingle Style
- NRHP reference No.: 95000660
- Added to NRHP: May 26, 1995

The Trinity Episcopal Church is a historic church at 131 W. Emerson Street in Melrose, Massachusetts. The main church building was constructed in 1886 to a design by Boston architect Charles Brigham. It is connected to its parish house, built in 1936 with a significant addition in 1956.

The church reported 158 members in 2018 and 120 members in 2023; no membership statistics were reported in 2024 parochial reports. Plate and pledge income reported for the congregation in 2024 was $121,806 with average Sunday attendance (ASA) of 44 persons.

The main building is English Revival (Tudor) in styling. Its walls are made of multiple colors of granite, and are topped by a steeply pitched slate roof. There is a large projecting gable section on the southern facade, which, along with the tower in the southeastern corner, has the half-timber styling typical of Tudor Revival. The eastern facade has a projecting curved section, which houses the apse on the interior; it is from this section that the church is connected to the parish house via the somewhat utilitarian 1956 addition. The parish house was designed in Shingle Style by Boston architect and parish member William H. Smith, although with sympathy to the Tudor styling of the church.

The church was listed on the National Register of Historic Places in 1995.

== See also ==
- National Register of Historic Places listings in Middlesex County, Massachusetts
