= Little Sandy Bottom Pond =

Lake in Massachusetts

- Location within Massachusetts
- Location: Pembroke, Massachusetts
- Coordinates: 42°02′30″N 70°49′57″W
- Basin countries: United States
- Surface area: 54 acres (22 ha)
- Settlements: Bryantville

Little Sandy Bottom Pond is a 54-acre (220,000 m^{2}) pond in Pembroke, Massachusetts, in the Bryantville section of town. The pond is a Class A tributary to Great Sandy Bottom Pond, a public water supply for the Abington/Rockland Joint Water Works.
