= Furnace Pond (Pembroke, Massachusetts) =

Lake of the United States

- Location within Massachusetts Location within the United States
- Location: Pembroke, Massachusetts
- Coordinates: 42°03′20″N 70°49′40″W
- Primary inflows: inlet from Oldham Pond
- Primary outflows: Tubbs Meadow Brook
- Basin countries: United States
- Surface area: 107 acres (43 ha)
- Max. depth: 9 ft (2.7 m)

Furnace Pond is a 107-acre (0.43 km^{2}) pond in Pembroke, Massachusetts. The pond is located southeast of Oldham Pond which is connected to Furnace Pond by an inlet, and east of Great Sandy Bottom Pond. The maximum depth is nine feet. The pond is a Class A Public Water Source for the Brockton Water Commission. Water from this pond is diverted into Silver Lake through Tubbs Meadow Brook, the pond's outflow, whenever there is a water shortage there. The Furnace Pond Neighborhood Association maintains a semi-public beach along the pond.
