= Fairhaven Town Hall =

- U.S. National Register of Historic Places
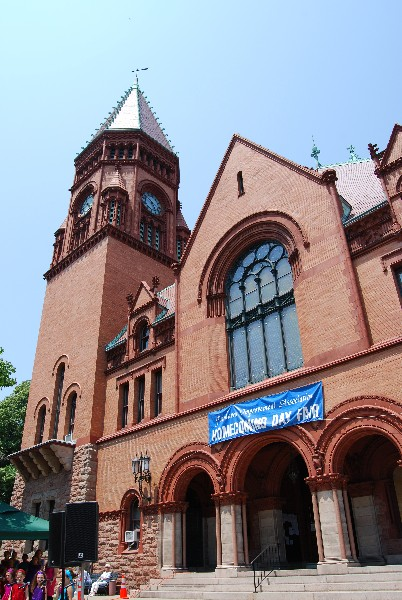

- Location within Massachusetts Location within the United States
- Location: Fairhaven, Massachusetts
- Coordinates: 41°38′11″N 70°54′14″W
- Built: 1892
- Architect: Charles Brigham
- Architectural style: Late Gothic Revival, Romanesque
- NRHP reference No.: 81000122
- Added to NRHP: January 22, 1981

Fairhaven Town Hall is the town hall of Fairhaven, Massachusetts. It is located at 40 Center Street, between Walnut and William Streets, across Center Street from the Millicent Library. The brick and stone High Victorian Gothic hall was designed by Charles Brigham and built in 1892. It was given to the town by Henry Huttleston Rogers, who also made other significant contributions to the town, including the library. The building's granite trim elements were quarried in St. George, New Brunswick and Red Beach, Maine.

The town hall was listed on the National Register of Historic Places in 1981 and has had a preservation restriction on it since 1998.

== See also ==
- National Register of Historic Places listings in Bristol County, Massachusetts
