= Albert Burrage =

American industrialist, attorney, horticulturist and philanthropist (1859–1931)

A. C. Burrage
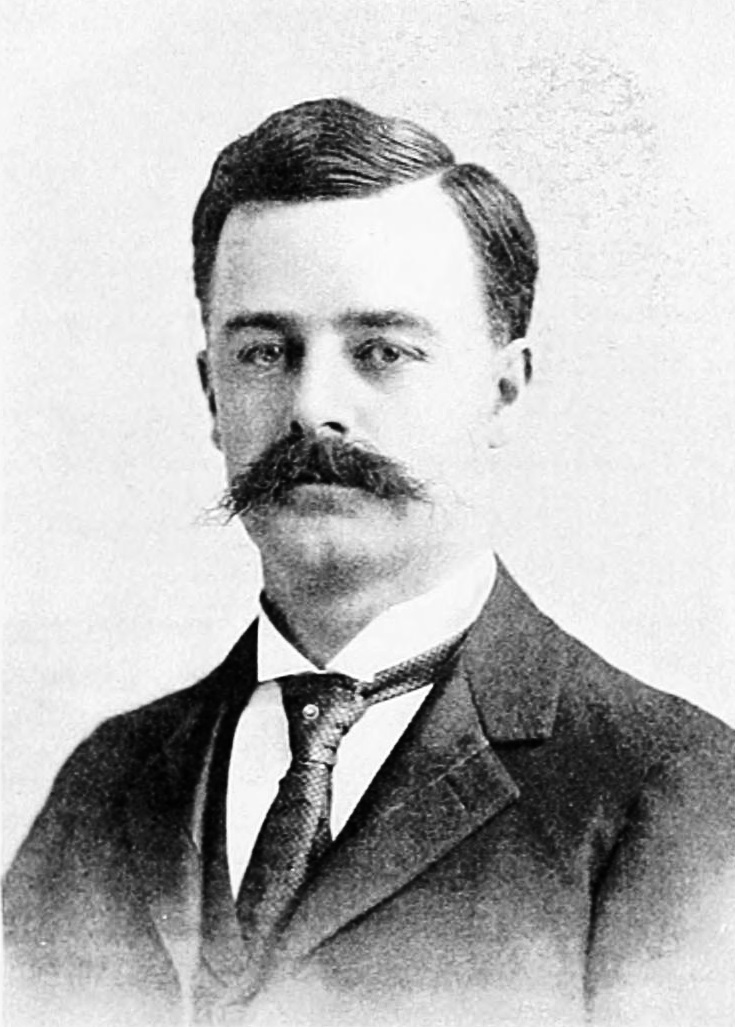
- Born: Albert Cameron Burrage; November 21, 1859; Ashburnham, Massachusetts, US
- Died: June 29, 1931 (aged 71); West Manchester, Massachusetts, US
- Education: Harvard Law School
- Occupations: Industrialist, lawyer, horticulturist, philanthropist
- Title: President, American Orchid Society
- Spouse: Alice Hathaway Haskell
- Children: 3
- Awards: The Lindley Medal (Royal Horticultural Society)

Albert Cameron Burrage (November 21, 1859 – June 29, 1931), known as A. C. Burrage, was an industrialist, attorney, horticulturist and philanthropist from the United States.

== Birth ==
Albert Burrage was born on November 21, 1859, in Ashburnham, Massachusetts. His parents were George Sanderson and Aurelia Chamberlin Burrage. He moved to California with his parents when quite young and remained there until he was 18 years old.

== Early career ==
After a short period of study in Europe he enrolled in Harvard College in 1879, graduating summa cum laude in 1883. He went on to the Harvard Law School, graduating the next year and was admitted to the Massachusetts bar in September 1884. He became counsel of the Brookline Gas Light Company in 1892. In this position he earned an $800,000 fee for helping the company bring service to Boston. He was elected president of the Boston, South Boston, Roxbury and Dorchester Gas Light Companies.

== Copper mining ==
He resigned his positions in gas light companies in 1898 to enter the copper mining industry. He organized the Amalgamated Copper Company and was director until its dissolution. Burrage was also one of the organizers of the Chile Exploration Company and the Chile Copper Company. The development of new processes for treating low-grade copper ores was one of his industrial interests. He was called the "Copper King".

== Public service ==
Burrage was a member of the Boston Common Council in 1892. He served on the Boston Transit Commission that was responsible for building the Boston subway.

== Mineralogy ==
Burrage purchased the gold collection of Georges de la Bouglise at an auction in Paris in 1911. He later bequeathed his assemblage of gold ores to the Harvard Mineralogical Museum.

== Horticulture ==
Burrage was widely known as a cultivator of rare orchids. A 1932 memorial in The Bulletin of the American Orchid Society stated, "No person has done more to encourage the study and cultivation of Orchids than Mr. Burrage." The Massachusetts Horticultural Society awarded him the George R. White Medal of Honor in 1922 for establishing an outstanding collection of exotic orchids in Beverly, Massachusetts. In 1925 he received the Lindley Medal from the Royal Horticultural Society of England for an exhibition of Cypripediums displayed in a natural setting at the Chelsea Flower Show in London. He was elected president of the Massachusetts Horticultural Society in 1921 and became founding president of the American Orchid Society (AOS) the same year. He served as president of the AOS for eight years until his health declined. He was a Fellow of the Royal Horticultural Society of England and a member of the Horticultural Society of New York, the Pennsylvania Horticultural Society and The Garden Club of America.

The nothogenus × Burrageara of the orchid family is named for Albert Burrage.

== Properties and philanthropy ==
Burrage's 28 room mansion on Commonwealth Avenue in Boston, Massachusetts was built in 1899 at a cost of US$600,000. It was converted to medical offices in 1948.

His summer residence the Needles in Hanson, Massachusetts was completely destroyed by fire on May 27, 1907. Burrage, his wife Alice, their four children, Alice's sister and the families six servants all escaped the burning residence. The loss was estimated at US$75,000. The Needles was rebuilt soon after and additional buildings were added. Burrage sold the Needles to the Camp Fire Girls in 1922.

In 1901 Burrage built a holiday home in Redlands, California - the Burrage Mansion - to escape East Coast winters and entertain fellow aristocrats.

He was known in Boston for his philanthropy.

== Published works ==
- — (1891). Municipal Lighting : Argument of Albert C. Burrage, Esq. Made in Remonstrance in Behalf of the Suburban Light and Power Company and the Brookline Gas Light Company, Before the Committee on Manufactures of the Massachusetts Legislature, March 24, 1891. YA Pamphlet Collection (Library of Congress). Boston: Press of S. Usher. OCLC 35567000.

== Personal life ==
On November 10, 1885, he married Alice Hathaway Haskell of Boston, Massachusetts. Their children were Albert Cameron Burrage Jr., Mrs. Harold L. Chalifoux and Russell Burrage. With his wife he gave a dinner party for the United States Secretary of Agriculture William Jardine and his wife, who were in town for an orchid show, at the St. Regis Hotel. In 1931 he gave a coming out party for his granddaughter Katherine "Kitty" Lee Burrage that cost US$50,000.

The Boston Evening Clinic, also known as the Burrage House, located on 314 Commonwealth Avenue was designated a Boston Landmark through the Boston Landmarks Commission in 2003.

== Death ==
He died on June 29, 1931, of heart disease at West Manchester, Massachusetts. Although he had been in poor health for a year he was able to attend the wedding of his granddaughter Katherine Lee Burrage to Forrester A. Clark after hosting a reception for the wedding party on his yacht Aztec in the days before his death. He died at his summer home Sea Home with his wife at his side.

== See also ==
- Chuquicamata
- Camp Kiwanee
- Bumpkin Island
