= Hanson (CDP), Massachusetts =

Hanson, Massachusetts
- Census-designated place
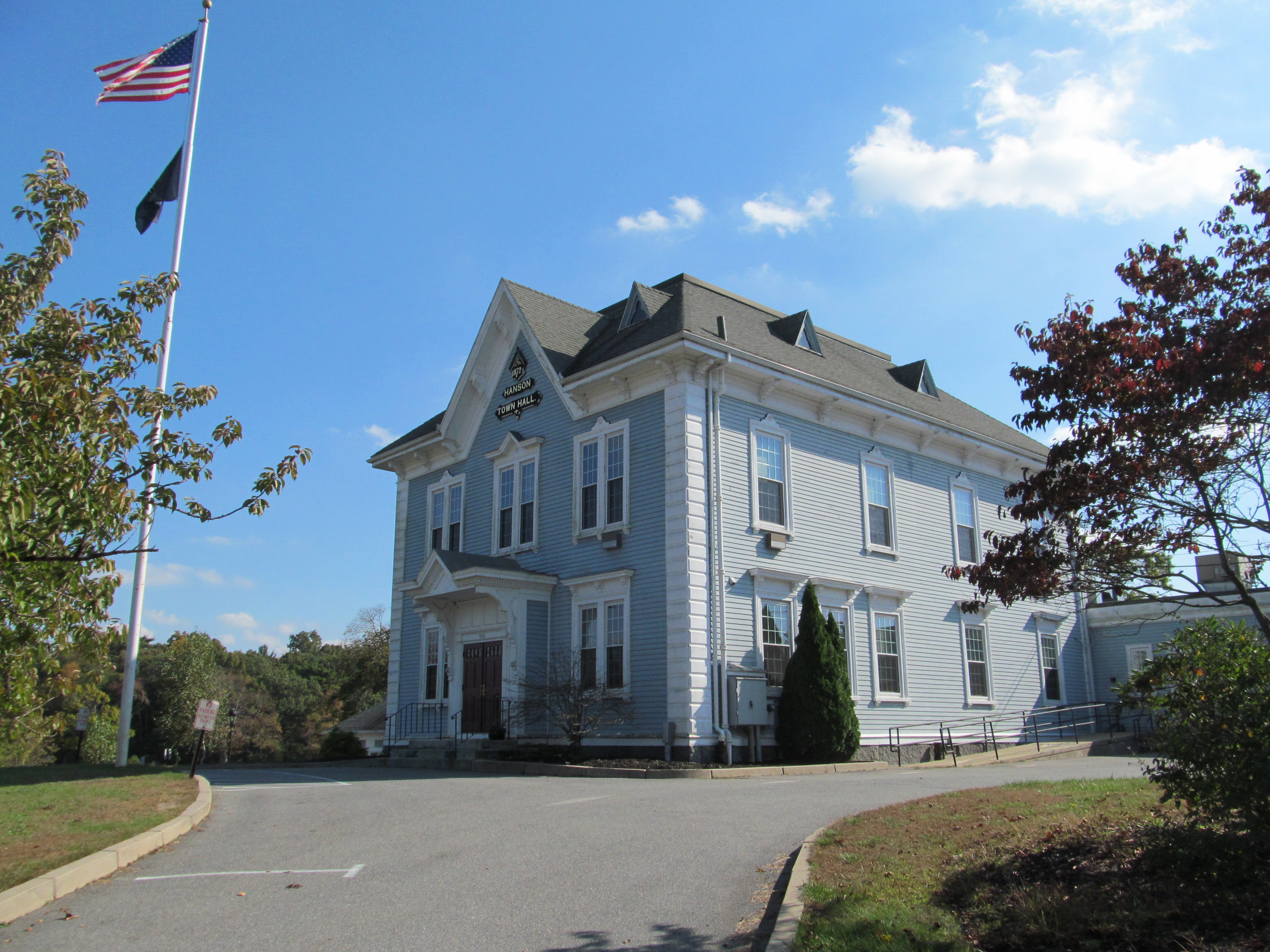
- Town Hall

- Location in Plymouth County in Massachusetts
- Coordinates: 42°4′3″N 70°51′2″W
- Country: United States
- State: Massachusetts
- County: Plymouth

Area
  - Total: 2.09 sq mi (5.42 km^{2})
  - Land: 1.83 sq mi (4.75 km^{2})
  - Water: 0.26 sq mi (0.67 km^{2})
- Elevation: 98 ft (30 m)

Population (2020)
  - Total: 2,028
  - Density: 1,105.3/sq mi (426.75/km^{2})
- Time zone: UTC-5 (Eastern (EST))
  - Summer (DST): UTC-4 (EDT)
- ZIP Code: 02341
- Area code: 781
- FIPS code: 25-28460
- GNIS feature ID: 0613516

Hanson is a census-designated place (CDP) in the town of Hanson in Plymouth County, Massachusetts, United States. The population was 2,118 at the 2010 census.

== Geography ==
Hanson is located at 42°4′2″N 70°51′1″W (42.067413, -70.850524).

According to the United States Census Bureau, the CDP has a total area of 5.5 km^{2} (2.1 mi^{2}), of which 4.8 km^{2} (1.9 mi^{2}) is land and 0.6 km^{2} (0.2 mi^{2}) (11.79%) is water.

== Demographics ==
Historical population
Census	Pop.	Note	%±
2020	2,028		—
U.S. Decennial Census

At the 2000 census, there were 2,044 people, 652 households and 560 families residing in the CDP. The population density was 422.0/km^{2} (1,092.8/mi^{2}). There were 661 housing units at an average density of 136.5/km^{2} (353.4/mi^{2}). The racial makeup was 97.99% White, 0.44% Black or African American, 0.29% Asian, 0.24% from other races, and 1.03% from two or more races. Hispanic or Latino of any race were 0.68% of the population.

There were 652 households, of which 40.8% had children under the age of 18 living with them, 73.2% were married couples living together, 9.7% had a female householder with no husband present, and 14.1% were non-families. 11.0% of all households were made up of individuals, and 3.7% had someone living alone who was 65 years of age or older. The average household size was 3.13 and the average family size was 3.40.

27.4% of the population were under the age of 18, 7.7% from 18 to 24, 31.1% from 25 to 44, 27.2% from 45 to 64, and 6.7% who were 65 years of age or older. The median age was 36 years. For every 100 females, there were 98.1 males. For every 100 females age 18 and over, there were 95.8 males.

The median household income was $64,896 and the median family incomewas $71,250. Males had a median income of $47,760 and females $28,098. The per capita income was $23,433. About 1.1% of families and 1.8% of the population were below the poverty line, including none of those under age 18 and 4.4% of those age 65 or over.
