= HMCS Beaver =

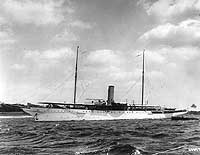
- USS Aztec in 1902

History
- Name: Aztec
- Builder: Crescent Shipyard, Elizabeth, New Jersey
- Yard number: 99
- Launched: 22 April 1902
- Fate: Leased by USN 1917, returned 1919, acquired by RCN 1940

United States
- Name: Aztec
- Namesake: Aztec
- Acquired: 29 June 1917
- Commissioned: 30 June 1917
- Decommissioned: 15 March 1919
- Identification: SP-590
- Fate: Returned to owner 7 August 1919

Canada
- Name: Beaver
- Acquired: 28 May 1940
- Commissioned: 1 April 1941
- Decommissioned: 17 October 1944
- Identification: Pennant number: S10 (later Z10)
- Honours and awards: Atlantic 1942
- Fate: Sold in 1946

General characteristics
- Type: Armed yacht
- Displacement: 808 long tons (821 t)
- Length: 260 ft (79 m)
- Beam: 28 ft (8.5 m)
- Draught: 13 ft (4.0 m)
- Speed: 12 knots (22 km/h; 14 mph)
- Complement: 50
- Armament: 1 × 4-inch (102 mm) naval gun

HMCS Beaver was an armed yacht that served in the Royal Canadian Navy during the Second World War. Originally named Aztec, the yacht was requisitioned for service in the United States Navy during the First World War under the same name. Returned to her owner in 1919, the yacht was laid up in 1931 following her owner's death. The vessel was purchased via a third party for service in the Royal Canadian Navy and after commissioning, Beaver was primarily used as a training ship with limited time as a patrol vessel. Following the war she was sold in 1946 and broken up for scrap in 1956.

== Description ==
As initially constructed, the yacht had a gross register tonnage (GRT) of 848 and was powered by a triple expansion steam engine driving two shafts. This gave the vessel a maximum speed of 16 knots (30 km/h; 18 mph). As an armed yacht in Canadian service, Beaver had a displacement of 808 long tons (821 t), was 260 ft (79 m) long overall with a beam of 28 ft (8.5 m) and a draught of 13 ft (4.0 m). The vessel had a maximum speed of 12 knots (22 km/h; 14 mph) and was armed with one 4-inch (102 mm) naval gun, an ASDIC set and depth charges. Beaver had a complement of 5 officers and 45 crew.

== Service history ==
=== Construction and early career ===
Aztec was constructed by Crescent Shipyard at Elizabeth, New Jersey with the yard number 99 and launched in 22 April 1902. Owned initially by Albert C. Burrage, the vessel was leased by the United States Navy during the First World War. The yacht was acquired by the United States Navy on 29 June 1917 and placed in commission on 30 June 1917.

The yacht was overhauled and upon completion, was assigned to the 1st Naval District based at Boston, Massachusetts and designated the flagship. Aztec's duties comprised naval facilities inspections and escorting submarines from Boston to New London, Connecticut, and troopships to Halifax, Nova Scotia. The vessel also patrolled the Grand Banks off Newfoundland. Aztec was decommissioned on 15 March 1919 and returned to A.C. Burrage on 7 August 1919. Aztec remained in Burrage's possession until his death in 1931. Following his death, the yacht was laid up at Boston and remained there until 1940.

=== Canadian service ===
After failing to acquire any British vessels at the outset of the Second World War for auxiliary purposes, the Royal Canadian Navy discreetly searched the American market for suitable ships. However, American law prevented the sale of ships for possible use in the war to any of the belligerents. The Canadian Navy requisitioned unsuitable Canadian yachts and had their respective owners go the United States and buy those ships the Navy wanted as replacements. Once the ships arrived in Canada, the navy then returned the original yachts and requisitioned the new ones. Aztec was one such ship and was acquired by the Royal Canadian Navy on 28 May 1940.

Initially carrying the pennant number S10 and later Z10, she was commissioned as Beaver into the Royal Canadian Navy on 4 April 1941 at Halifax, Nova Scotia. After commissioning, the ship was assigned to the Halifax Local Defence Force. Deployed mainly as a radar training ship, the vessel transferred briefly to the local force operating out of Saint John, New Brunswick and then Sydney Force, operating from Sydney, Nova Scotia as a local patrol vessel at the end of 1942.

On 27 December 1942, Beaver underwent a refit at Halifax. Returning to service, the ship was ordered to Digby, Nova Scotia to become a training ship for the defensively equipped merchant ship (DEMS) gunners and, later, seamanship training. Beaver underwent another refit at Halifax from 9 February until 24 June 1944. The vessel served as a personnel transport between Halifax and St. John's, Newfoundland until serious defects sent the ship to the dockyard for repair. Due to the age and condition of the vessel, Beaver was not repaired and was paid off on 17 October 1944. On 13 July 1945, the vessel was declared surplus and on 25 August, was handed over to the War Assets Corporation for disposal. She was sold in 1946 to Wentworth N. MacDonald and in 1956 was scrapped. The ship was given the battle honour "Atlantic 1942" for her service in during World War II.
