= Old Watertown High School =

- U.S. National Register of Historic Places
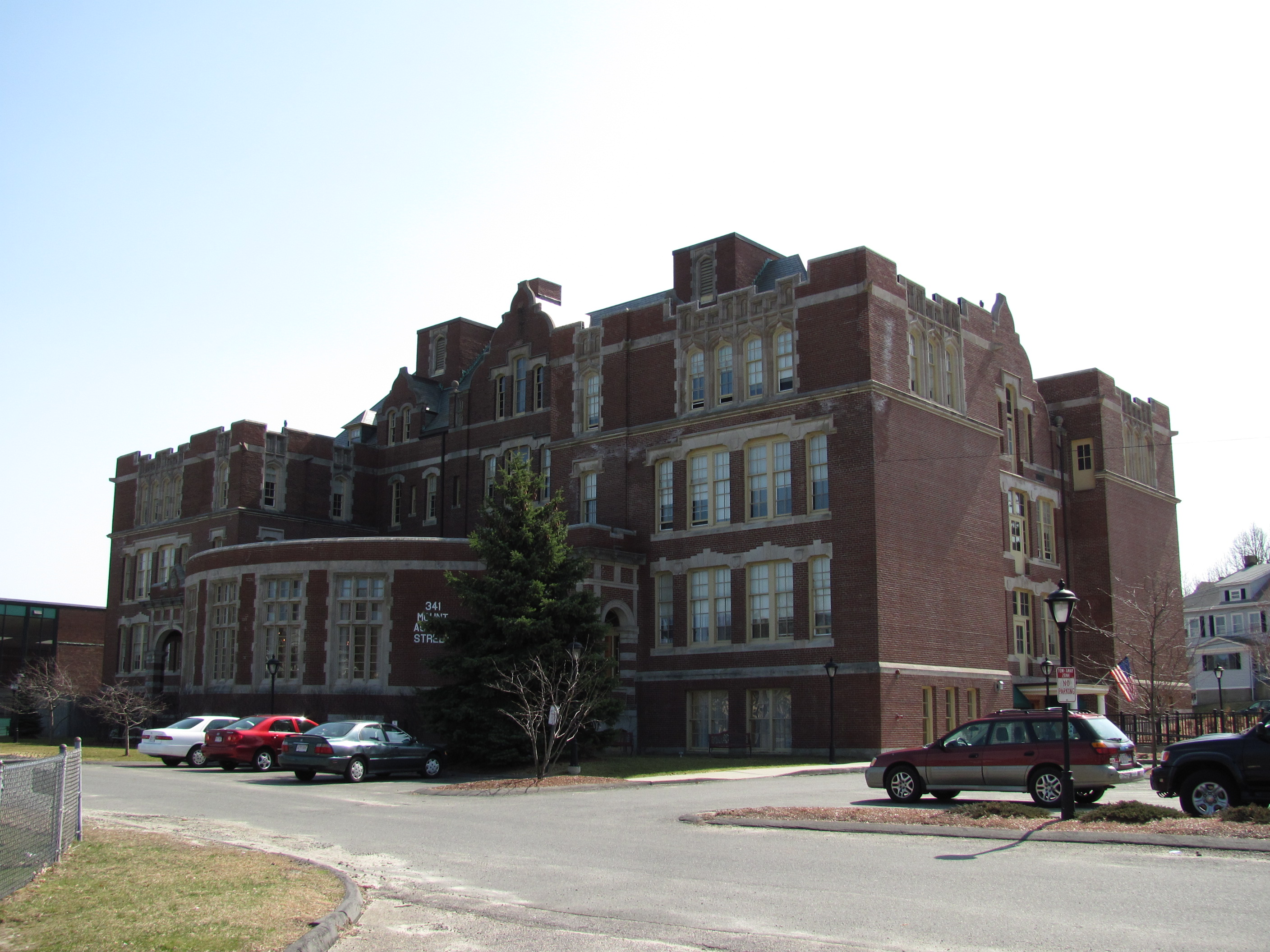
- Old Watertown High School

- Location within Massachusetts Location within the United States
- Location: Watertown, Massachusetts
- Coordinates: 42°22′07″N 71°10′10″W
- Area: 1.26 acres (0.51 ha)
- Built: 1913
- Architect: Charles Brigham; Duff, John W.
- Architectural style: Tudor Revival
- NRHP reference No.: 06000860
- Added to NRHP: September 22, 2006

Old Watertown High School is a historic school building at 341 Mount Auburn Street in Watertown, Massachusetts, United States. The 3 1/2 story brick building was built in 1913 by local architect Charles Brigham. Now an assisted living facility named Brigham House, the English Revival structure is one of Watertown's most imposing public buildings, standing about one mile east of Watertown center. When built it first served as the city's high school, but was converted to a junior high school in 1925, a role it served until the late 1980s. It then stood vacant until its conversion to housing in the 2000s.

The building was listed on the National Register of Historic Places in 2006.

== See also ==
- National Register of Historic Places listings in Middlesex County, Massachusetts
