= Hanson, Massachusetts =

Town in the United States

- Town
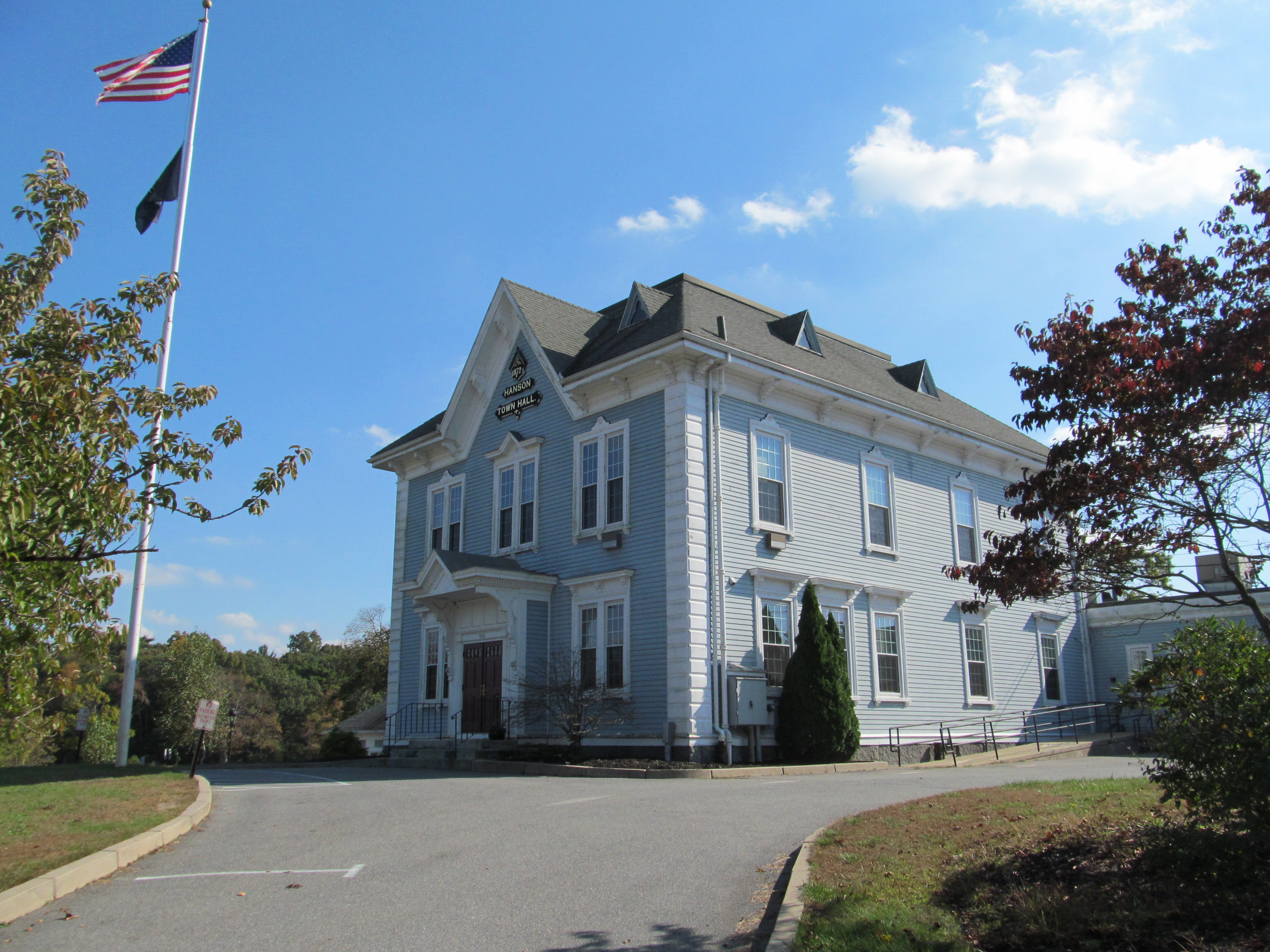
- Town Hall

- Seal
- Nickname: Cranberry City
- Location in Plymouth County in Massachusetts
- Coordinates: 42°04′30″N 70°52′50″W
- Country: United States
- State: Massachusetts
- County: Plymouth
- Settled: 1632
- Incorporated: 1820

Government
  - Type: Open town meeting
  - Town Administrator: Lisa Green
  - Select Board: Jim Hickey; Laura Fitzgerald-Kemmett; Joseph Weeks; Ann Rein; Edwin Heal

Area
  - Total: 15.7 sq mi (40.6 km^{2})
  - Land: 15.0 sq mi (38.9 km^{2})
  - Water: 0.66 sq mi (1.7 km^{2})
- Elevation: 89 ft (27 m)

Population (2020)
  - Total: 10,639
  - Density: 708/sq mi (273/km^{2})
- Time zone: UTC−5 (Eastern)
  - Summer (DST): UTC−4 (Eastern)
- ZIP Codes: 02341 (Hanson); 02350 (Monponsett)
- Area code: 339/781
- FIPS code: 25-28495
- GNIS feature ID: 0619468
- Website: www.hanson-ma.gov

Hanson is a town in Plymouth County, Massachusetts, United States. Part of Greater Boston, Hanson is located 20 miles (32 km) south of Boston and is one of the inland towns of the South Shore. The population was 10,639 at the 2020 census. It contains the census-designated place of the same name.

== History ==
Hanson was first settled in 1632 as the western parish of Pembroke. The town was officially incorporated in 1820, and was named for Maryland publisher of the Federal Republican newspaper and U.S. Senator Alexander Contee Hanson. Hanson was a champion of free speech and freedom of the press, and he was severely beaten and his newspaper offices were attacked and destroyed by an angry mob after he published an article that was critical of the administration shortly after the outbreak of the War of 1812.

The town's early industry revolved around farming, as well as bog iron and quarrying. Mills also popped up along the rivers during the nineteenth century. Today the town is mostly residential, with some farming and cranberry farming. Ocean Spray was first started by several bogs in Hanson, and remained headquartered in Hanson before moving to Plymouth in September 1977.

Hanson was home to the Plymouth County Hospital, a tuberculosis sanatorium, located on Bonney Hill, opening in 1919 and remaining open until 1992. It was demolished in 2017.

== Geography ==
According to the United States Census Bureau, the town has a total area of 15.7 square miles (40.6 km^{2}), of which 15.0 square miles (38.9 km^{2}) is land and 0.66 square miles (1.7 km^{2}), or 4.21%, is water. It is the 250th largest town in the Commonwealth, over seven square miles smaller than the average. Hanson is considered one of the inland towns of Massachusetts's South Shore and is bordered by Rockland and Hanover to the north, Pembroke to the east, Halifax to the south, East Bridgewater to the west, and Whitman to the northwest. Hanson is located approximately 9 miles (14 km) east of Brockton, 13 miles (21 km) south of Quincy, and 18 miles (29 km) south-southeast of Boston.

Mostly flatland, the highest elevation in town is Bonney Hill at 152 ft (46 m), making it one of the highest points in Plymouth County. Another hill of prominence is Almshouse Hill near the current-day center of town and named for the Josiah Cushing home (built in 1763), which was purchased in 1837 and used as an almshouse until 1902.

Hanson, like many towns in central Plymouth County, is dominated by lakes, rivers, and swamps. The largest ponds include Oldham Pond along the Pembroke town line, Indian Head Pond (the source of Indian Head Brook) just south of Oldham Pond, Maquan Pond, located east of the center of the town, and Wampatuck Pond, located in the center of the town. In addition to Indian Head Brook, the town has several other brooks and rivers, including the Shumatuscacant River and Poor Meadow Brook to the west, and White Oak Brook to the south. To the north of town lies the Little Cedar Swamp, along Indian Head Brook. There is a small town forest and two camps, Rainbow Camp and Camp Kiwanee, within the town. Burrage Pond Wildlife Management Area lies mainly in the section of town called Burrage or South Hanson. About half of the 1,625 acres (7 km^{2}) are in Hanson, the other half in Halifax.

== Neighborhoods ==
Historically, the town of Hanson was home to several unique and distinct villages. From the town's early history into the 1900s, the United States Postal Service maintained offices at Hanson Center (Harding's Corner), North Hanson (North Hanson Railroad Station), Bryantville, Monponsett and South Hanson. By 1940, only the South Hanson and Monponsett Post Offices remained open, with Bryantville being moved to the Pembroke side of the road. That same year, the Post Office would change the South Hanson name to just Hanson. Today, some distinct neighborhoods still exist, while South Hanson and Monponsett tend to be the most well known.

- South Hanson: Formerly the center of town during the industrial era. South Hanson follows Massachusetts Route 27 from the border of Pembroke to Tri-Town (where East Bridgewater, Whitman, and Hanson all intersect). South Hanson was formerly home to the Plymouth County Hospital, a tuberculosis sanatorium, as well as the original Ocean Spray Cranberry Co. facility. The historic and now abandoned South Hanson train station building sits adjacent to the modern MBTA Hanson station. Much of the main one-mile stretch of the South Hanson center suffers from urban decay and deindustrialization given its large number of run down buildings in a once prosperous area, though revival attempts have seen some small businesses open up in the historic buildings.
- Monponsett: On the southern border with Halifax and has its own post office and zip code (02350). Monponsett is named for the Monponsett Twin Lakes which lies along much of the Hanson/Halifax border.
- Burrage: In South Hanson and named for Albert Burrage, one of the town's most prominent industrialists. He formed the Atlantic Dyestuff Company which had its first factory where present-day Hawks Avenue is located. Litecontrol, now of Plympton, had used the historic industrial complex before relocating. The historic factory was demolished in 2016. Burrage was also previously home to a library and a hotel, both of which closed in the early 1900s. Burrage includes portions of Pleasant Street, South Street and Reed Street.
- Brentwood: The north-eastern region of Hanson, including Brook Street, State Street, Gorwin Drive, and their side streets.

== Demographics ==
Historical population
| Year | Pop. | ±% |
|---|---|---|
| 1850 | 1,217 | — |
| 1860 | 1,245 | +2.3% |
| 1870 | 1,219 | −2.1% |
| 1880 | 1,309 | +7.4% |
| 1890 | 1,267 | −3.2% |
| 1900 | 1,455 | +14.8% |
| 1910 | 1,854 | +27.4% |
| 1920 | 1,910 | +3.0% |
| 1930 | 2,184 | +14.3% |
| 1940 | 2,570 | +17.7% |
| 1950 | 3,264 | +27.0% |
| 1960 | 4,370 | +33.9% |
| 1970 | 7,148 | +63.6% |
| 1980 | 8,617 | +20.6% |
| 1990 | 9,028 | +4.8% |
| 2000 | 9,495 | +5.2% |
| 2010 | 10,209 | +7.5% |
| 2020 | 10,639 | +4.2% |
| 2024* | 10,719 | +0.8% |
* = population estimate. Source: United States census records and Population Estimates Program data.

As of the census of 2000, there were 9,495 people, 3,123 households, and 2,545 families residing in the town. The population density was 632.5 inhabitants per square mile (244.2/km^{2}). There were 3,178 housing units at an average density of 211.7 per square mile (81.7/km^{2}).

There were 3,123 households, out of which 40.3% had children under the age of 18 living with them, 69.6% were married couples living together, 8.7% had a female householder with no husband present, and 18.5% were non-families. 14.8% of all households were made up of individuals, and 6.1% had someone living alone who was 65 years of age or older. The average household size was 3.03 and the average family size was 3.38.

In the town, the population was spread out, with 28.2% under the age of 18, 6.9% from 18 to 24, 31.1% from 25 to 44, 25.1% from 45 to 64, and 8.6% who were 65 years of age or older. The median age was 36 years. For every 100 females, there were 97.2 males. For every 100 females age 18 and over, there were 93.7 males.

The median income for a household in the town was $62,687, and the median income for a family was $68,560. Males had a median income of $46,508 versus $31,337 for females. The per capita income for the town was $23,727. About 2.8% of families and 3.8% of the population were below the poverty line, including 2.3% of those under age 18 and 11.6% of those age 65 or over.

Statistically, Hanson is the 180th most populous and the 154th most densely populated town in Massachusetts. It is just below the median in terms of population, and below the average but above the median in terms of density.

== Government ==
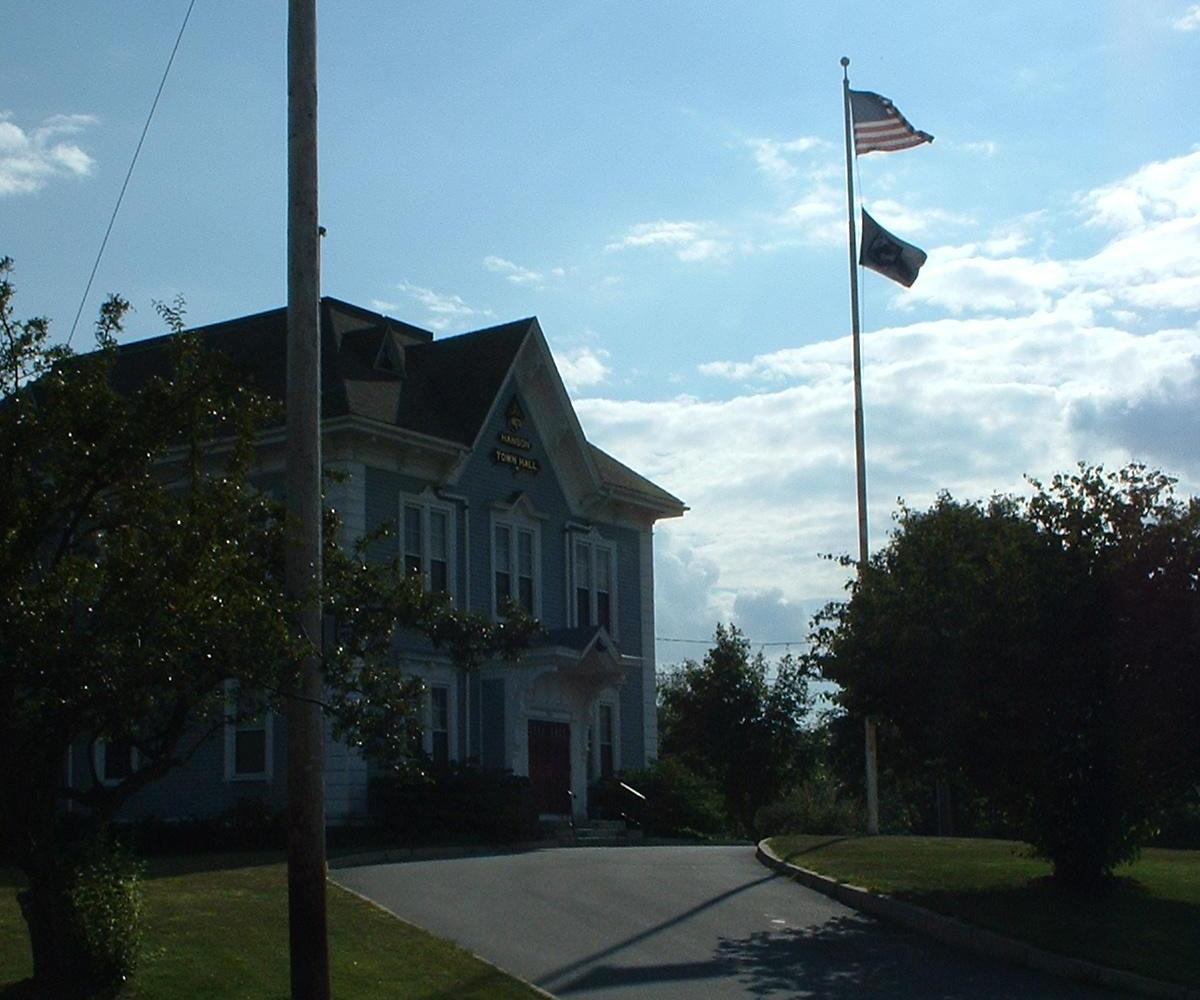
Hanson Town Hall

On the national level, Hanson is a community of the Ninth congressional district, currently represented by Bill Keating. The state's senior (Class I) member of the United States Senate is Elizabeth Warren. The junior (Class II) senator is Ed Markey.

On the state level, Hanson is represented in the Massachusetts House of Representatives as a part of the Sixth Plymouth district, which includes the towns of Duxbury, Pembroke and portions of Halifax. The town is represented in the Massachusetts Senate as a part of the Second Plymouth and Bristol district, which includes Brockton, Halifax, Hanover, Whitman and portions of East Bridgewater and Easton. The town is patrolled by the First (Norwell) Barracks of Troop D of the Massachusetts State Police.

Hanson is governed by the open town meeting form of government and is led by current Town Administrator Lisa Green and a five-member Board of Selectmen. The town hall is located on the shore of Wampatuck Pond, at the town center. In the same area are the Fire Department headquarters and the Hanson Public Library, which is a member of the SAILS Library Network. The Hanson Police Department headquarters, built in 2007, is located on Main Street (Rte. 27). There is a branch firehouse along Route 27 near the train station, and the town's post office is located near the intersection of Routes 27 and 58. Town meetings are held at the Hanson Middle School Auditorium.

Like several other neighboring towns, especially Halifax and East Bridgewater, Hanson is a right-leaning town on both the national and state levels. However, the last Democrat to carry the town in a presidential election was John Kerry, having narrowly won the town by a 0.7% margin in 2004. That being said, Joe Biden lost the town by just over 1 percent in 2020, making it the closest a Democrat has come to flipping Hanson back to the party.

== Education ==
Hanson shares a Pre-K through grade 12 school district (Whitman-Hanson Regional School District) with neighboring Whitman. The yearly operating assessments to both Towns are determined on the basis of student population. The town of Hanson owns the Hanson Middle School, and two elementary schools, Indian Head and Maquan, and leases them to the Whitman Hanson Regional School District, which is responsible for keeping the buildings in good repair. Maquan Elementary School has closed, and Indian Head Elementary serves students from kindergarten through fourth grades. Hanson Middle School serves students in grades five through eight. The town sends their students to Whitman-Hanson Regional High School, which is shared with the neighboring town of Whitman. The school was recently rebuilt through part of a $50 million project. It is located behind the previous building (which has been torn down and replaced with new athletic fields, including a synthetic turf football field) along Route 27 on the town line. Whitman-Hanson's teams are known as the Panthers, and their colors are red and black. Their chief rival is nearby Abington High, whom they play in the annual Thanksgiving Day football game.

In addition to Whitman-Hanson, students may choose to attend South Shore Vocational Technical High School in Hanover free of charge.

The nearest colleges to Hanson are Massasoit Community College in Brockton, Bridgewater State University in Bridgewater, and Quincy College in Quincy.

== Transportation ==
There are no freeways in Hanson, which is equidistant between Routes 3 and 24. The main state routes through town are Route 14 and Route 58, which intersect and run coextensively for a short stretch in the middle of town. Route 27 also passes through the town, following a portion of the Whitman and East Bridgewater borders before crossing the southern section of town.

The town is served by Hanson station on the Kingston Line of the MBTA Commuter Rail system. There is a small airport, Cranland Airport, which serves only small aircraft. The nearest national and international air service is at Logan International Airport in Boston.

== Notable people ==
- Barry Clifford, Underwater explorer and adventurer. Clifford discovered the Whydah Gally pirate ship shipwreck in 1982 off of Cape Cod. The Whydah Gally is the only confirmed pirate ship discovery in the world.
- John Delaney, college baseball coach at Quinnipiac
- Albert Hall, American hammer throw champion, who competed in the Olympics four times
- Mimi Imfurst, drag queen. Best known for competing on RuPaul's Drag Race
- Alex Karalexis, professional fighter; competed in the Ultimate Fighting Championship, World Extreme Cagefighting; original cast member on The Ultimate Fighter 1
- Rocky Marciano, the only undefeated heavyweight boxing champion; had a house at 867 Main Street in South Hanson
- Kristen Merlin, singer/songwriter, guitarist
- Kristie Mewis, professional soccer player currently signed with West Ham United and the United States national soccer team
- Samantha Mewis, retired professional soccer player for the United States national soccer team
- Maura Murray, resident of Hanson, missing person who vanished without a trace in 2004 in New Hampshire, whose case has gained international attention and media coverage
- Albert C. Read (1887–1967), Rear Admiral; Commander/Navigator of the NC-4, the first aircraft to complete a transatlantic flight in 1919
- Tiffany Scott, 2002 Olympic figure skater
- Ally Sentnor, professional soccer player with Kansas City Current and the United States women's national soccer team
- Jimmy Slyde (1927–2008), tap dancer
- Billy Sweezey, professional ice hockey player currently playing for the Providence Bruins
- David Flebotte, TV producer and writer
