= Coddington School =

- U.S. National Register of Historic Places
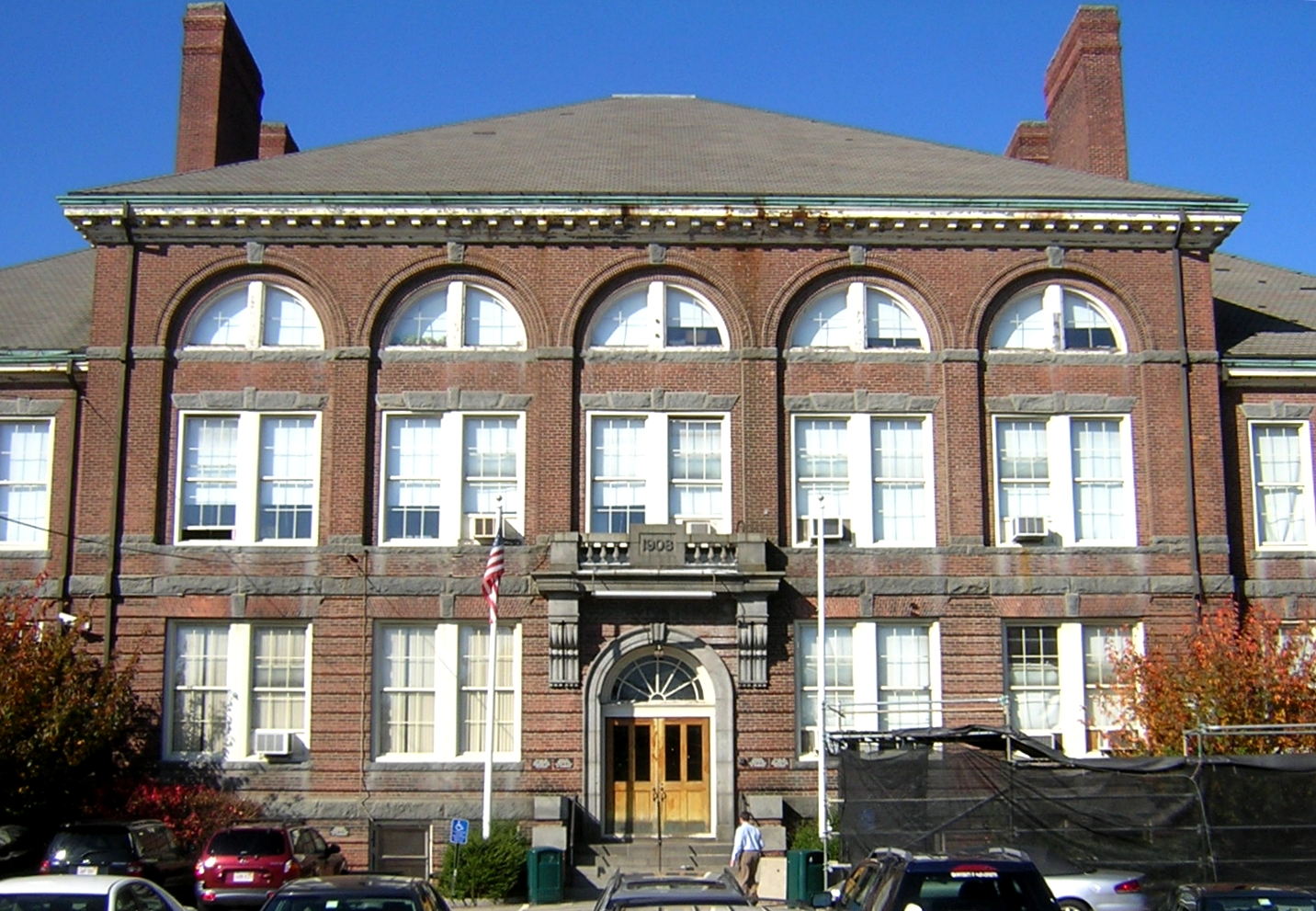

- Location within Massachusetts Location within the United States
- Location: 26--44 Coddington St., Quincy, Massachusetts
- Coordinates: 42°15′9″N 71°0′7″W
- Area: 1.3 acres (0.53 ha)
- Built: 1909
- Architect: Charles A. Brigham
- Architectural style: Colonial Revival
- MPS: Quincy MRA
- NRHP reference No.: 89001323
- Added to NRHP: September 20, 1989

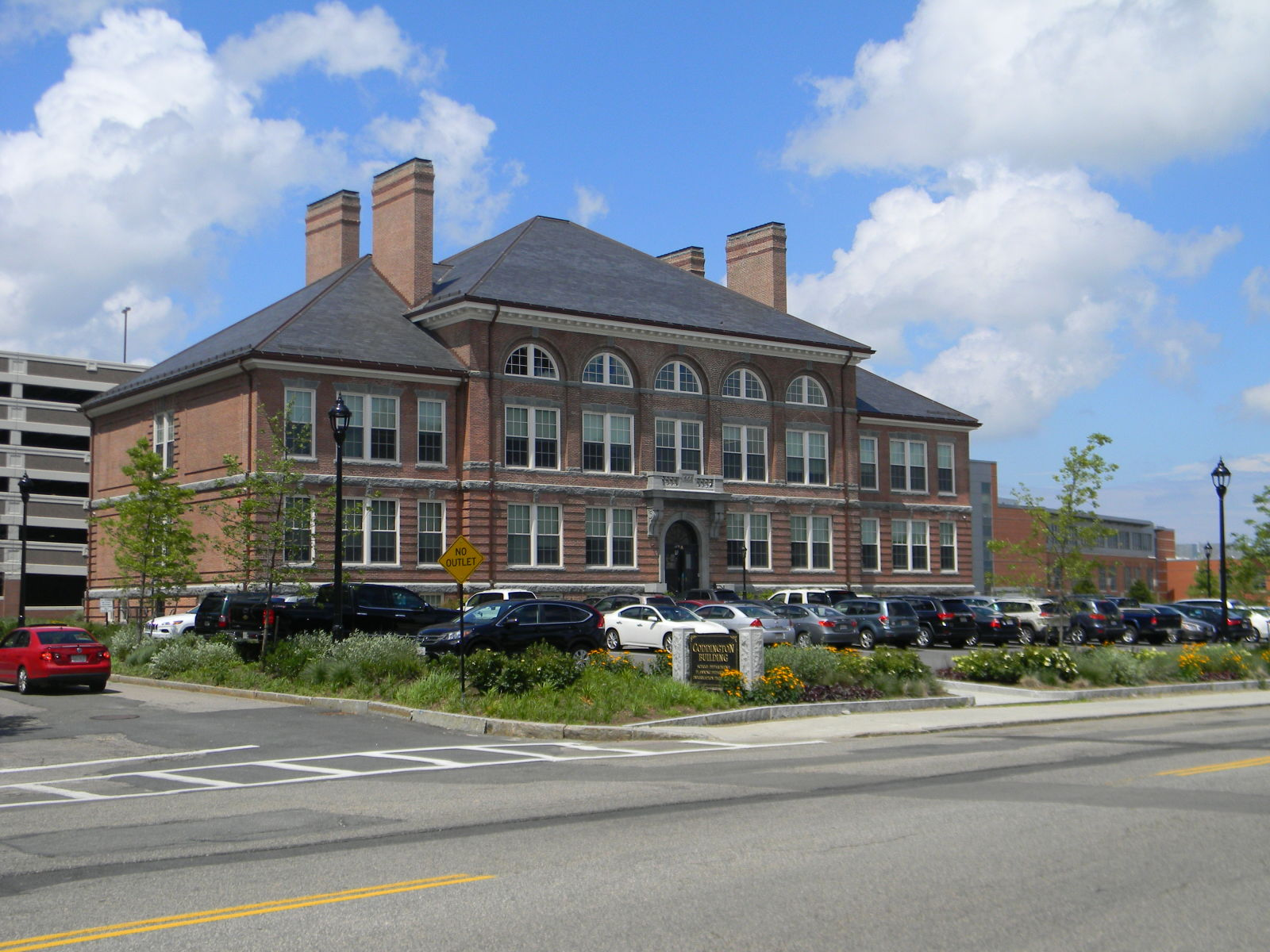
2015

The Coddington School is a historic school building at 26-44 Coddington Street in Quincy, Massachusetts. Built in 1909, this three-story brick building is the finest Colonial Revival school building in the city. It was designed in late 1907 by Charles A. Brigham, who is not to be confused with the better known and similarly-named Charles Brigham. It was used from the 1960s to the 2000s as part of Quincy Junior College (now Quincy College), and is now the headquarters of the Quincy School Department, as well as other municipal departments.

The building was listed on the National Register of Historic Places in 1989.

== See also ==
- National Register of Historic Places listings in Quincy, Massachusetts
