= Indian Head Pond (Massachusetts) =

Lake in Massachusetts, U.S.

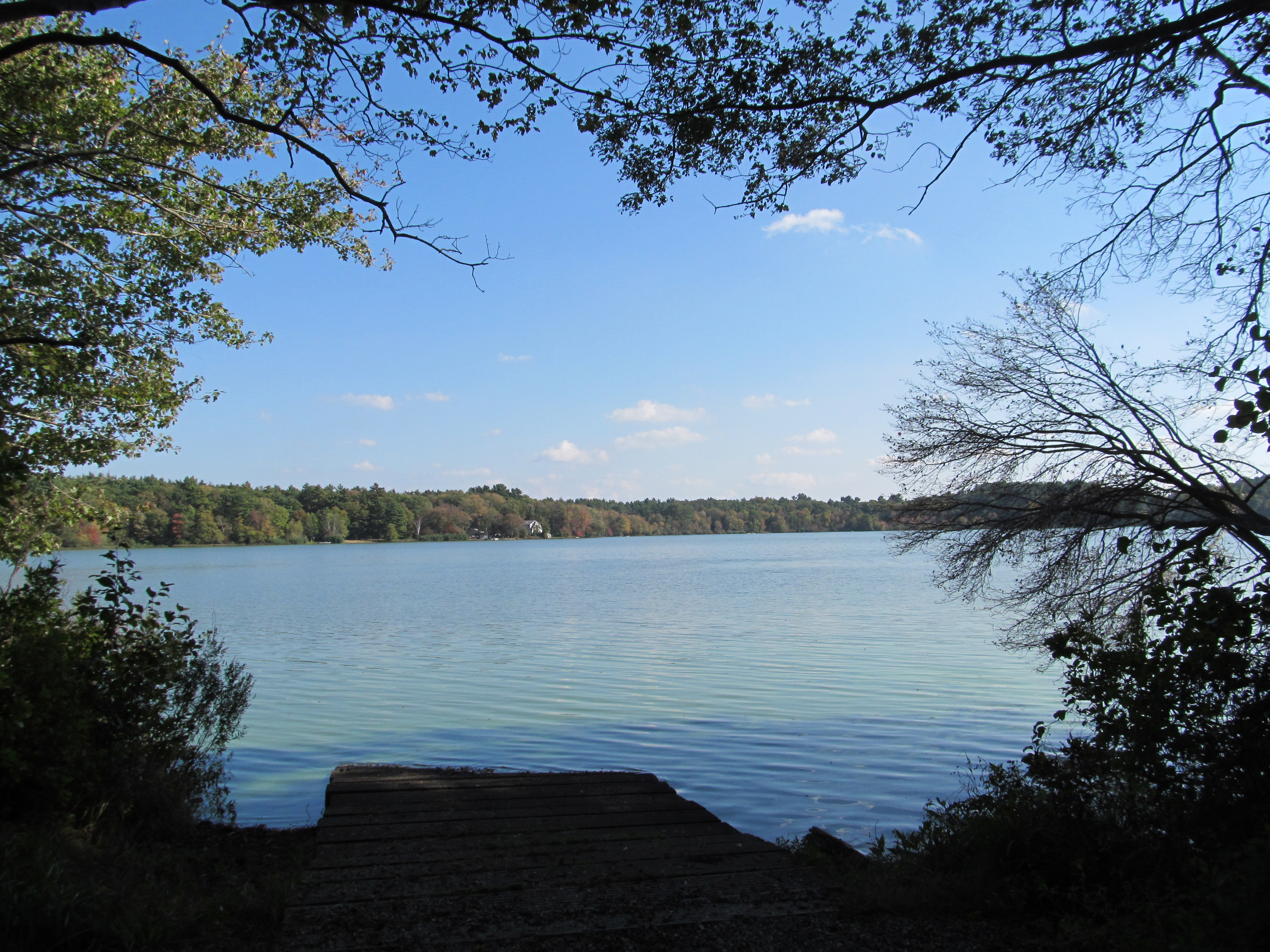
- Indian Head Pond

- Location within Massachusetts Location within the United States
- Location: Hanson, Massachusetts
- Coordinates: 42°03′00″N 70°51′00″W
- Primary outflows: Indian Head Brook
- Basin countries: United States
- Surface area: 121 acres (49 ha)

Indian Head Pond is a 121-acre (0.49 km^{2}) pond in Hanson, Massachusetts. The pond is a tributary to Furnace Pond, a public water supply, and is the headwaters to Indian Head Brook.
