= Camp Kiwanee =

- Camp Kiwanee Historic District
- U.S. National Register of Historic Places
- U.S. Historic district
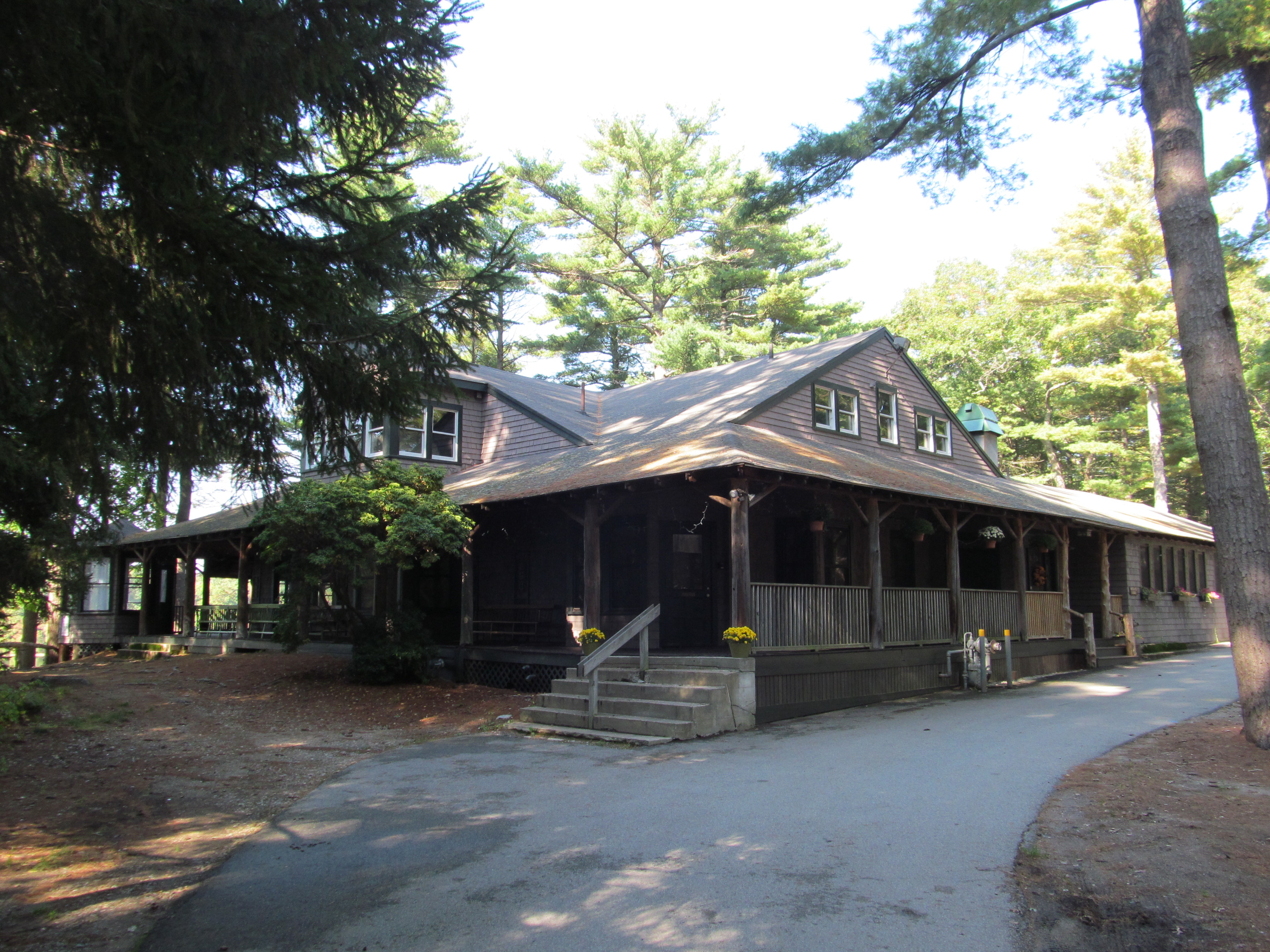
- Needles Lodge

- Location within Massachusetts Location within the United States
- Location: Hanson, Massachusetts
- Coordinates: 42°3′34″N 70°50′50″W
- Area: 68 acres (28 ha)
- Built: 1899
- Architectural style: Shingle Style, Tudor Revival
- NRHP reference No.: 05000081
- Added to NRHP: February 24, 2005

Camp Kiwanee is a summer camp and function facility at 1 Camp Kiwanee Road in Hanson, Massachusetts. The core of the property is a summer estate called "The Needles" which was built by industrialist Albert Cameron Burrage between 1899 and 1905. This property was purchased by the Boston chapter of the Camp Fire Girls, and adapted for use as a girls' summer camp. From the 1930s to the 1950s a series of recreational facilities was constructed, and the camp was enlarged by the purchase of adjacent properties. The Town of Hanson purchased the camp from the Camp Fire Girls in 1979, and continues to operate it as a campground and function facility.

The camp was listed on the National Register of Historic Places in 2005.

== See also ==
- National Register of Historic Places listings in Plymouth County, Massachusetts
