= Georges de la Bouglise =

French mining engineer

Georges-Alfred de La Bouglise (*25 April 1842 in Auteuil (Seine) – 1 December 1907 in Paris) was a French mining engineer who as a student played an important role in the gestation of the front-cranked velocipede named Michaux.

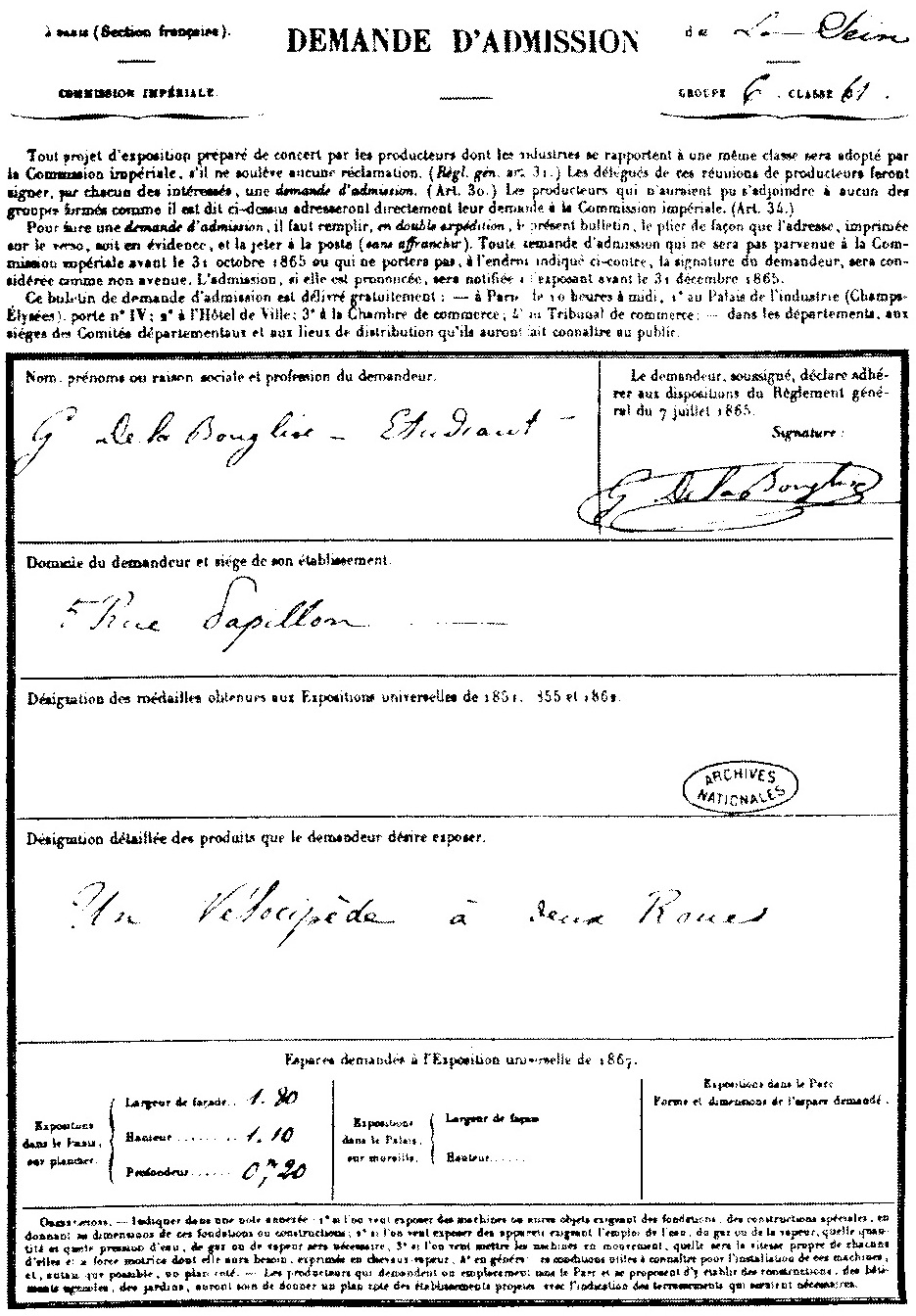
23-year-old Bouglise applies in 1865 to show a 2-wheeled velocipede on the 1867 World Fair

At École Impériale Centrale des Arts et Manufactures in Paris Bouglise was befriended by Aimé and René Olivier de Sanderval, who as entrepreneurs later became associated with Pierre Michaux as "Michaux et Cie". In 1865 student Bouglise applied for exhibiting a two-wheeled velocipede at the Paris World Fair in 1867, but was declined. Bouglise left the school and as a technical mastermind designed the production machinery at the company. In 1868 he returned to Ècole Impériale and finished his brevet.

In his later life Bouglise owned and was vice president of Société Anonyme des Mines that operated the Lexington Mine near Butte, Montana.
