= Adams Square (Boston) =

Square in Boston, Massachusetts

Coordinates: 42.35988°N 71.05746°W

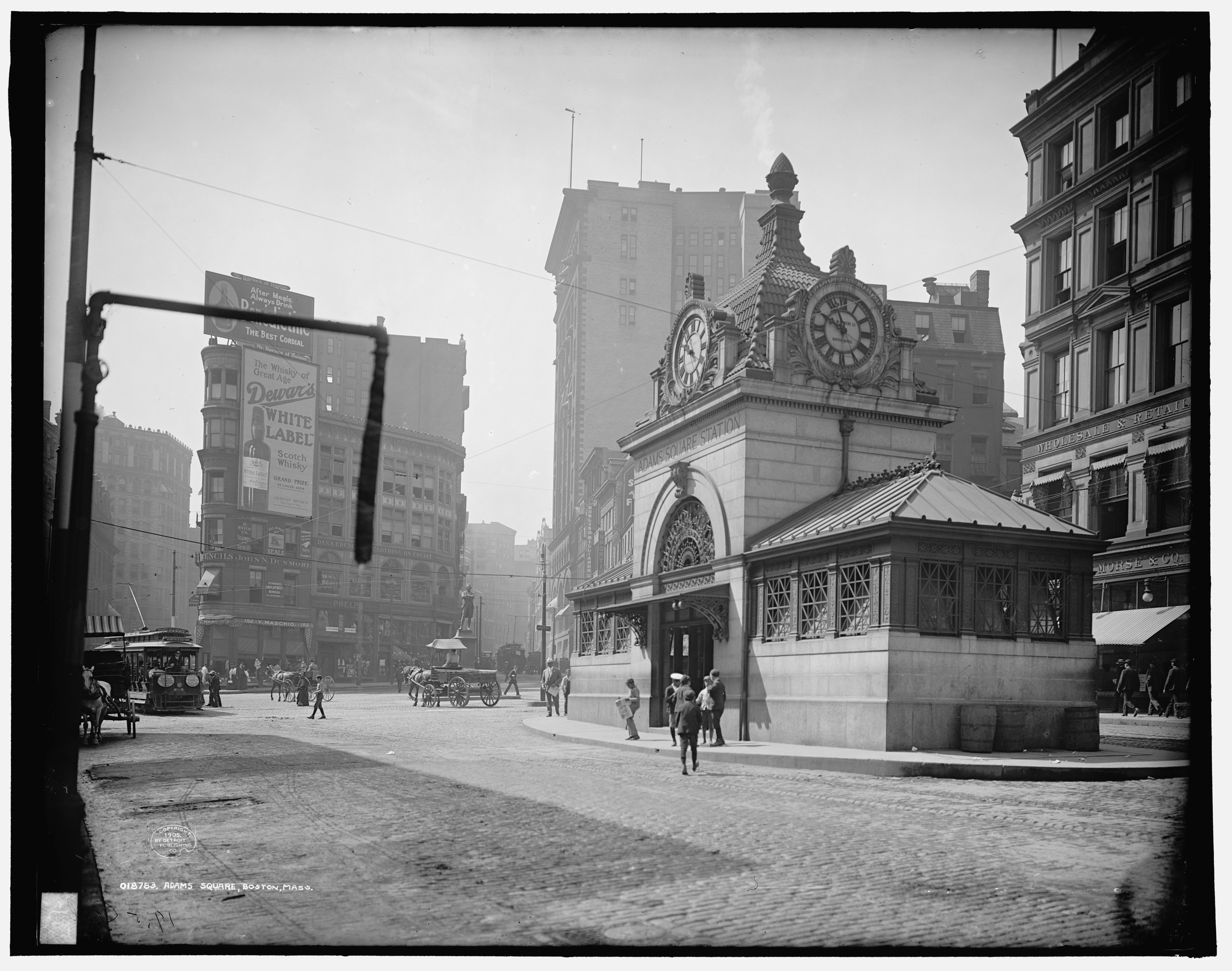
Adams Square c. 1905, looking south. The rear of the Ames Building is visible on the right

Adams Square (1879–1963) was a square in downtown Boston, Massachusetts. Now demolished, it was formerly located on the site of the current Boston City Hall in Government Center.

== History ==
The square was a product of the 1873–74 extension of Washington Street to Haymarket Square, which created a large open space at the junction of Cornhill, Brattle, Washington, and Devonshire Streets. In 1879 the city decided to erect a statue of the Patriot and statesman Samuel Adams at this spot, and the area was accordingly given the name Adams Square that same year. During its early history the square was part of a thriving retail district near the northern end of Washington Street and was the home of Leopold Morse & Co., one of the largest clothing retailers in the city.

In 1898 Adams Square became a stop along the Tremont Street Subway (the predecessor to the MBTA Green Line) with the opening of Adams Square Station, whose large granite head house became the principal architectural feature of the area. Subsequent alterations to the square in the early twentieth century were undertaken in an effort to relieve congestion caused by increasing automobile traffic. In 1928 the city removed the Adams statue and relocated it to adjacent Dock Square in order to improve traffic flow, and three years later the original head house of the subway station was torn down to increase driver visibility and replaced with a significantly smaller entranceway.

In the mid-20th century the square was targeted for urban renewal as part of the Government Center project. It was demolished in 1963 and replaced with Boston City Hall.

== Images ==
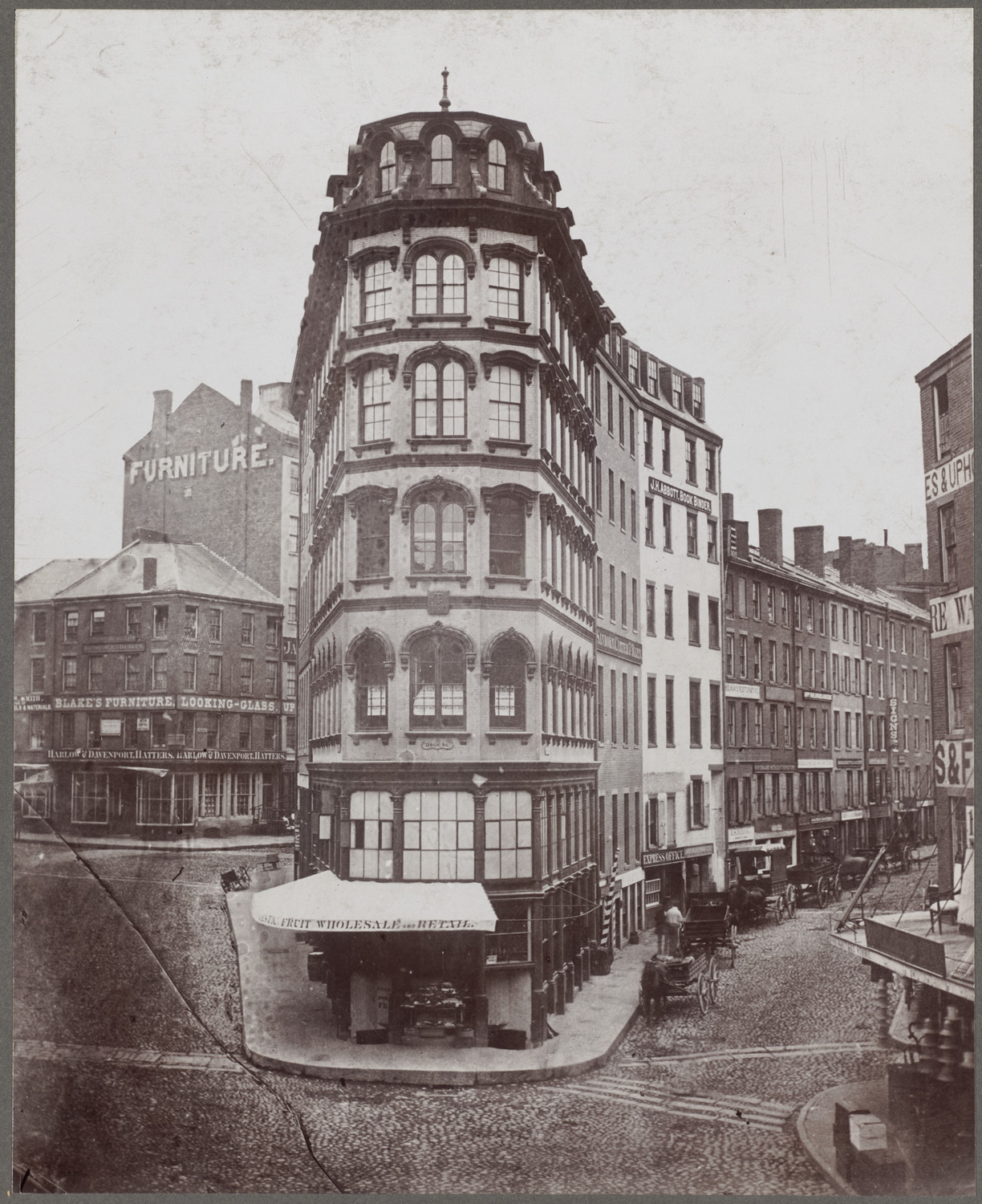
View from Dock Square toward the future site of Adams Square (center) and Brattle Street (right), 1860

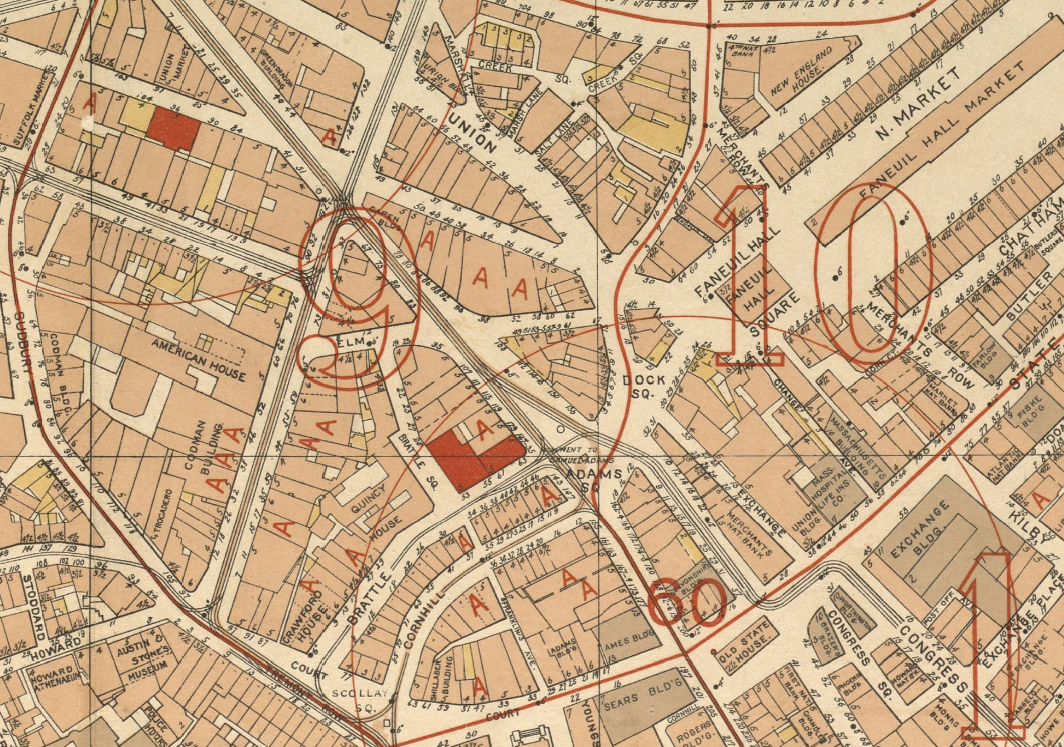
Map of Adams Square, 1896

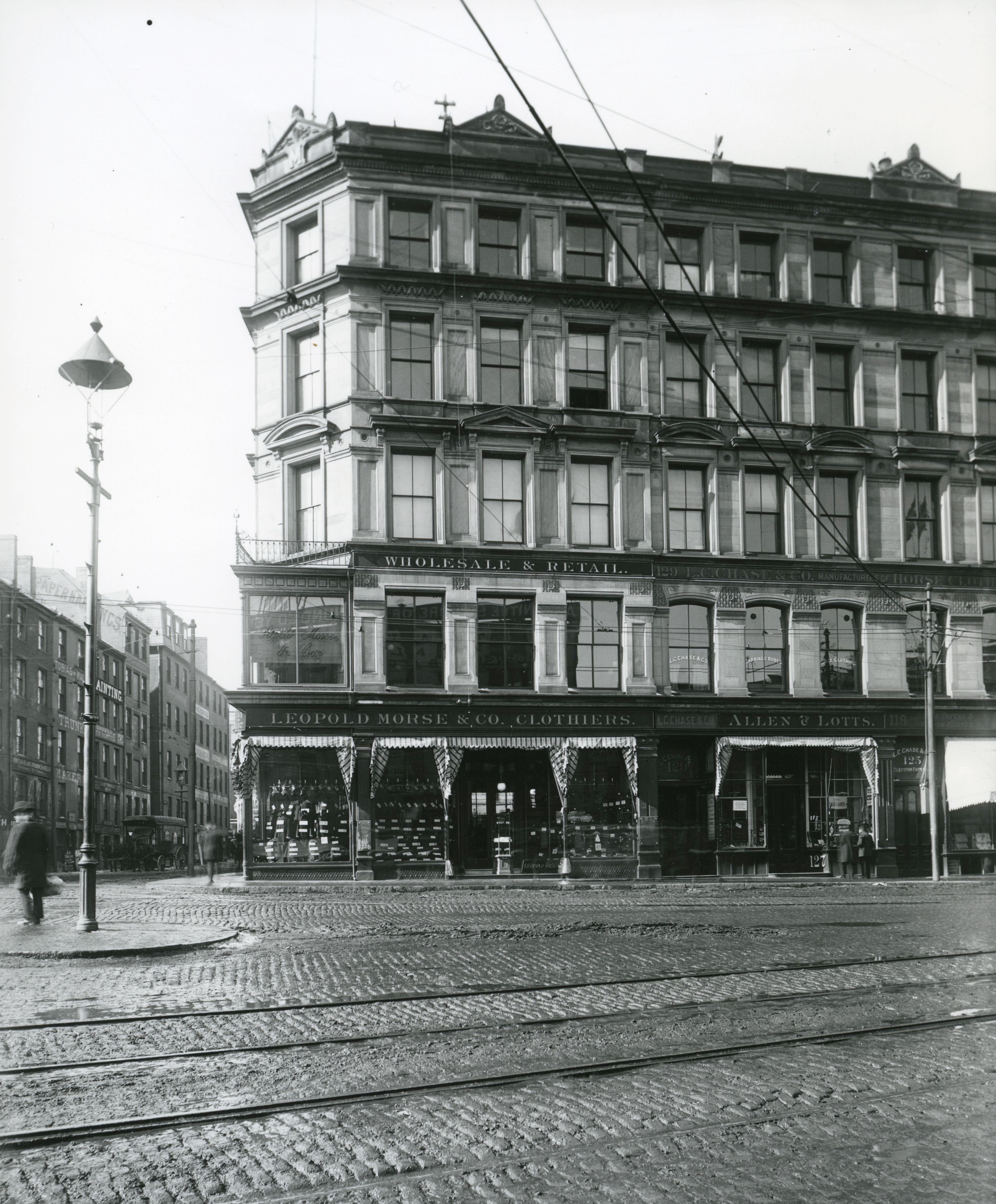
Adams Square looking west toward Brattle Street (left) and Leopold Morse & Co. (center), c. 1895

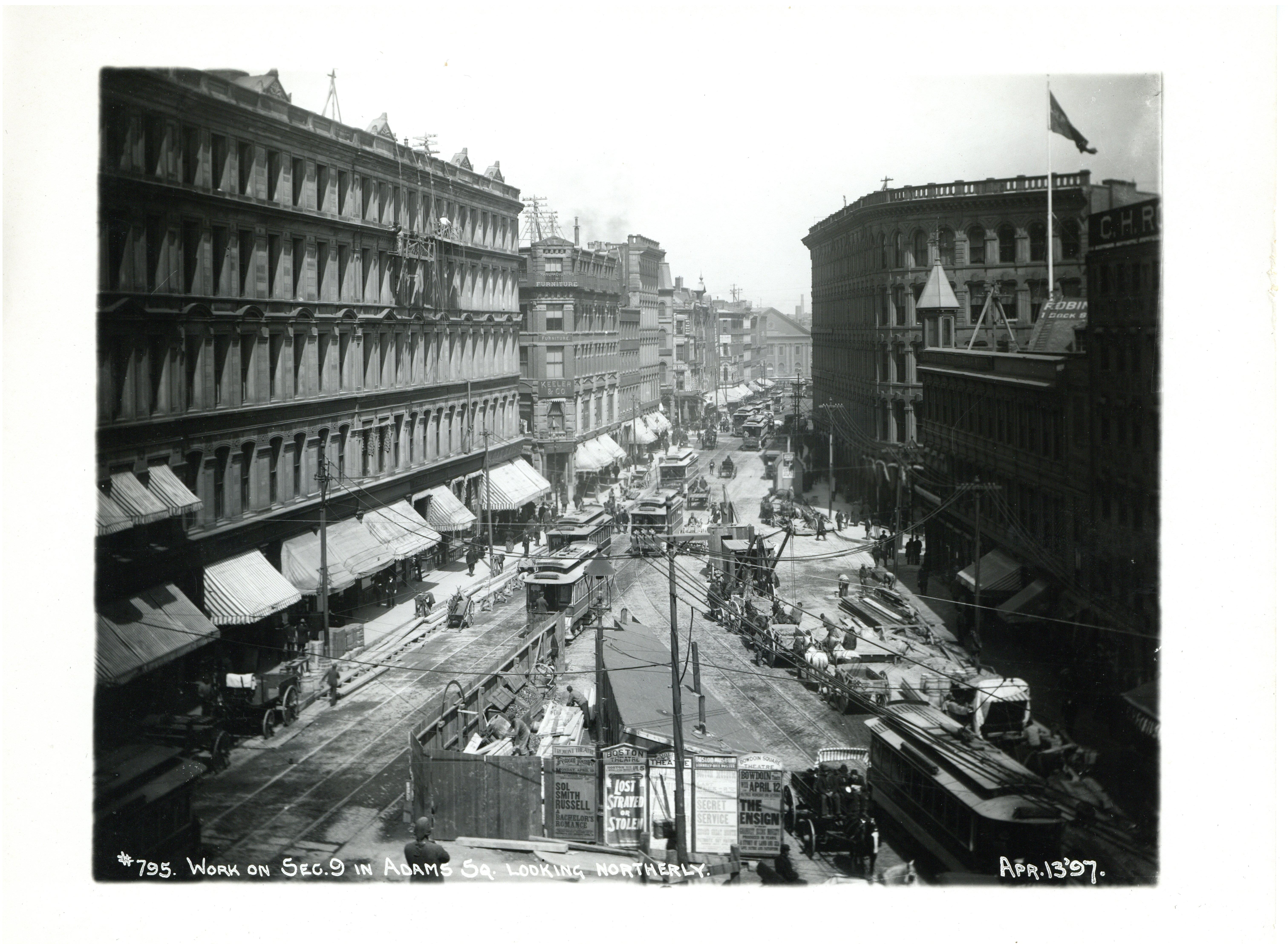
Adams Square looking north toward Haymarket Square, during the construction of Adams Square Station, 1897

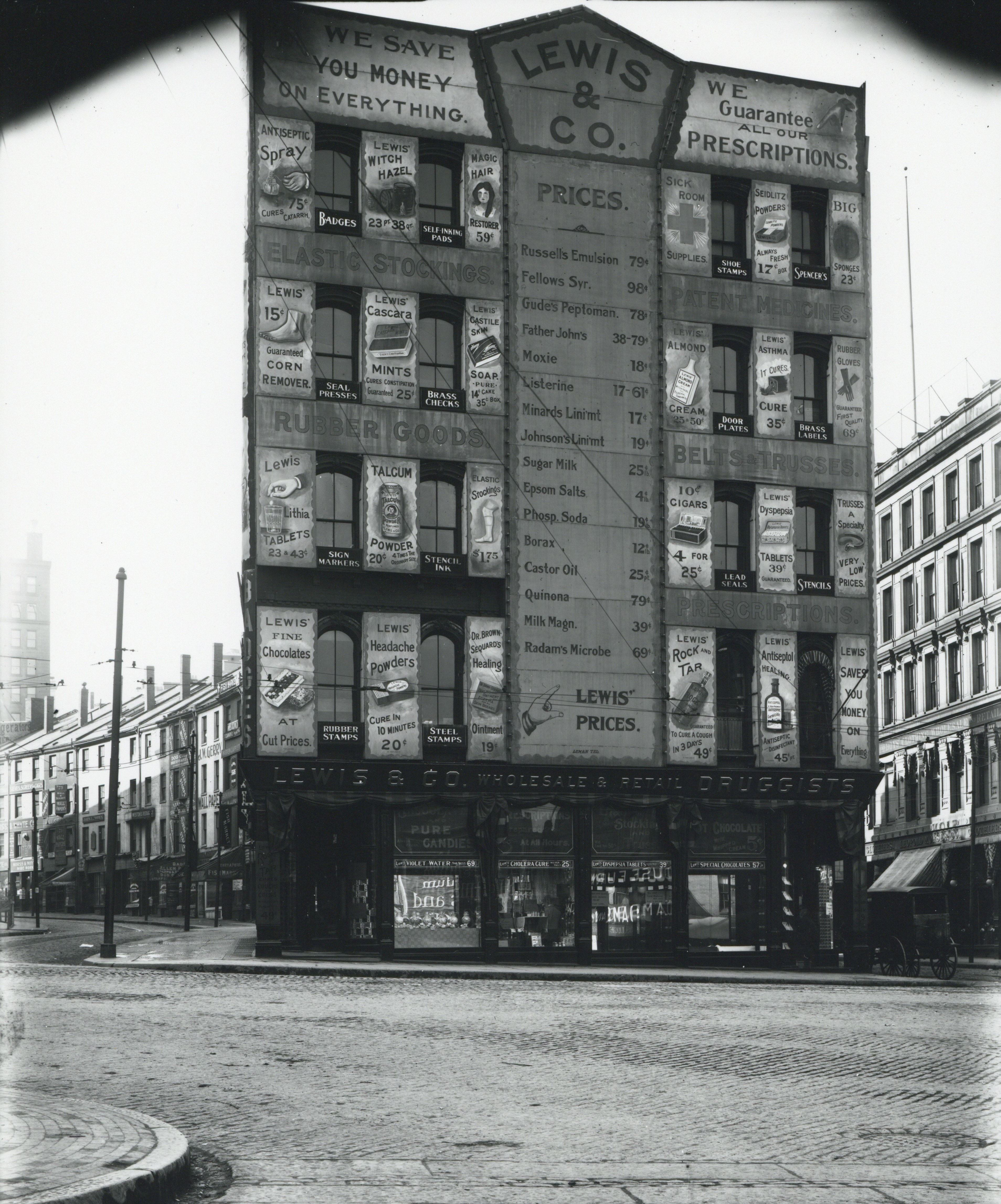
South side of Adams Square looking west toward Cornhill (left) and Brattle Street (right), 1905

== See also ==
- Dock Square
- Scollay Square
