= Indian Head, Pennsylvania =

Unincorporated community in Pennsylvania, US

- Unincorporated community
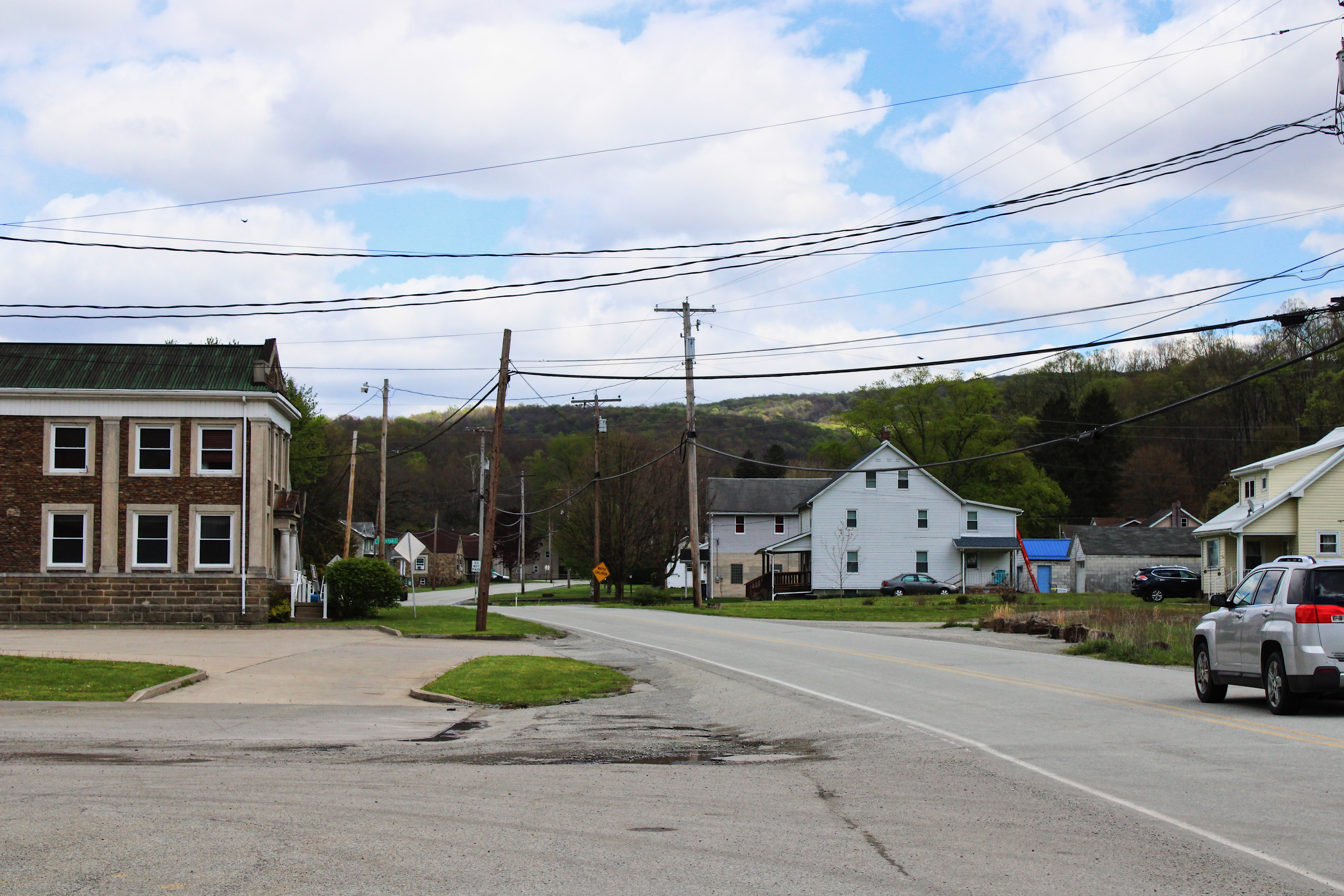
- Indian Head road

- Location within Pennsylvania
- Coordinates: 40°01′29″N 79°23′42″W
- Country: United States
- State: Pennsylvania
- County: Fayette
- Elevation: 1,398 ft (426 m)
- Time zone: UTC-5 (Eastern (EST))
  - Summer (DST): UTC-4 (EDT)
- ZIP code: 15446
- Area codes: 724, 878
- GNIS feature ID: 1177753

Indian Head is an unincorporated community in Fayette County, Pennsylvania, United States. The community is located along Pennsylvania Route 381, 10.4 miles (16.7 km) east of Connellsville.

== History ==
Indian Head was established in the 19th century, with its post office opening on December 17, 1853 with the ZIP code 15446. The community derives its name from its geographic location near the headwaters of Indian Creek, a tributary of the Youghiogheny River.

The surrounding area of Saltlick Township was settled during or shortly after the time of the American Revolution, with early settlers engaging primarily in agriculture and later in coal and mineral extraction. The development of transportation routes through the Indian Creek valley contributed to the growth of small communities such as Indian Head. In the late 19th and early 20th centuries, the region’s economy was influenced by coal mining and rail transportation, although Indian Head itself remained a small rural settlement.

The community is served by the Connellsville Area School District
