= Beverly Ranch =

Historic house in California, United States

- U.S. National Register of Historic Places
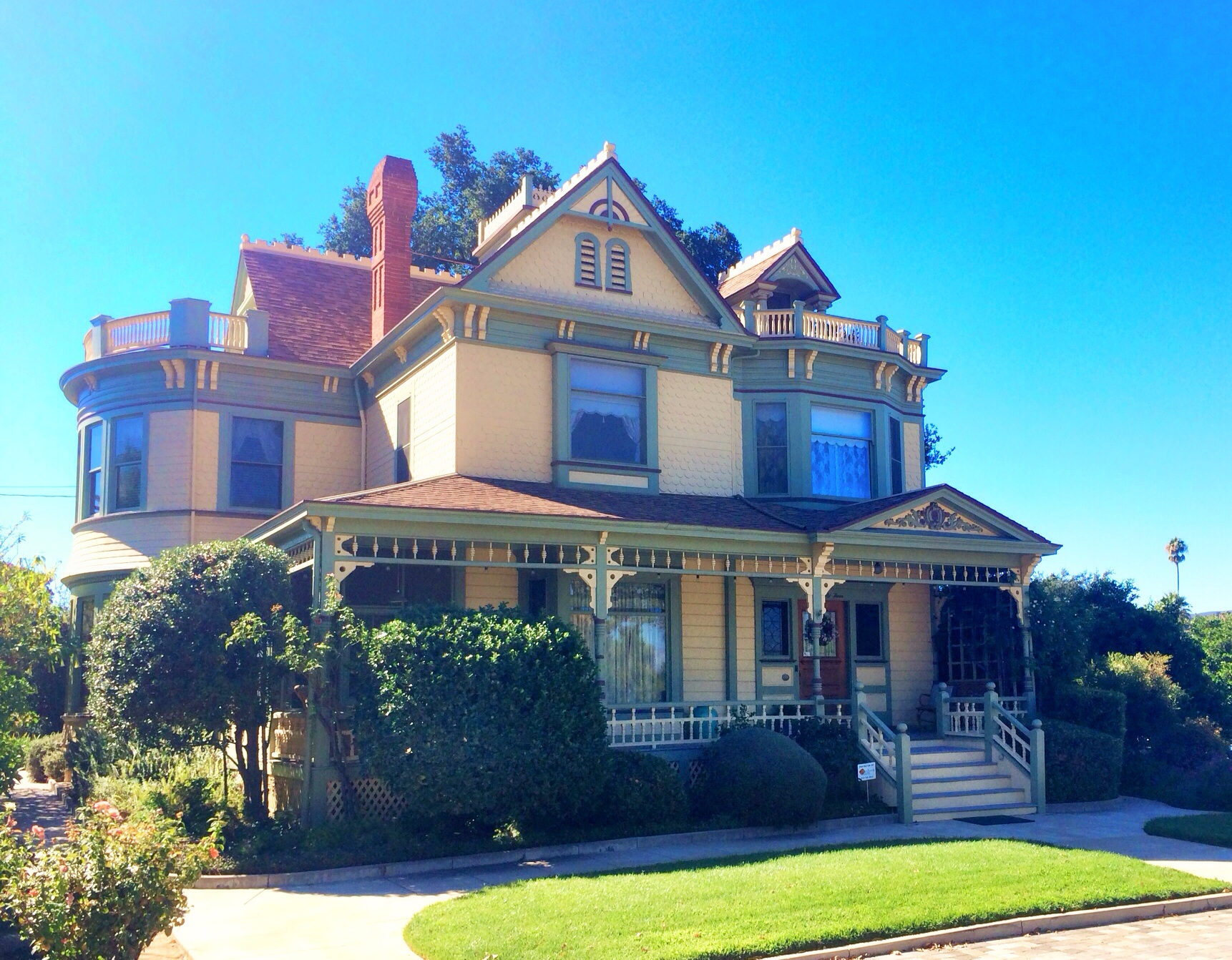

- Location within California Location within the United States
- Location: 923 W. Fern Ave., Redlands, California
- Coordinates: 34.044°N 117.1888°W
- Area: 4.8 acres (1.9 ha)
- Built: 1890
- Built by: Donald, Daniel M.
- Architect: Bishop, Corydon B.
- Architectural style: Queen Anne
- NRHP reference No.: 04000018
- Added to NRHP: February 11, 2004

Beverly Ranch is a historic orange grove located at 923 West Fern Avenue in Redlands, California. Will and Elizabeth Eddy established the grove in 1888; after Will's death, Elizabeth married John Fisk, and the couple built the grove's main house in 1890. The couple was one of the many wealthy families from the US East Coast who owned Southern California orange groves in the late 1800s. While citrus groves were ubiquitous at the time, Beverly Ranch is one of the few which is still in operation.

Architect Corydon B. Bishop designed the grove's Queen Anne house. The two-story redwood house has an asymmetrical plan with a multi-component roof. A wraparound front porch at the main entrance features a balustrade, turned posts, and decorative bracketing. The upper stories of the house feature shingle siding, several balconies, more brackets on the cornice, and cresting along the roof's gables.

The grove was added to the National Register of Historic Places on February 11, 2004.
