= Adams Square station =

Former streetcar station in Boston, Massachusetts

Adams Square
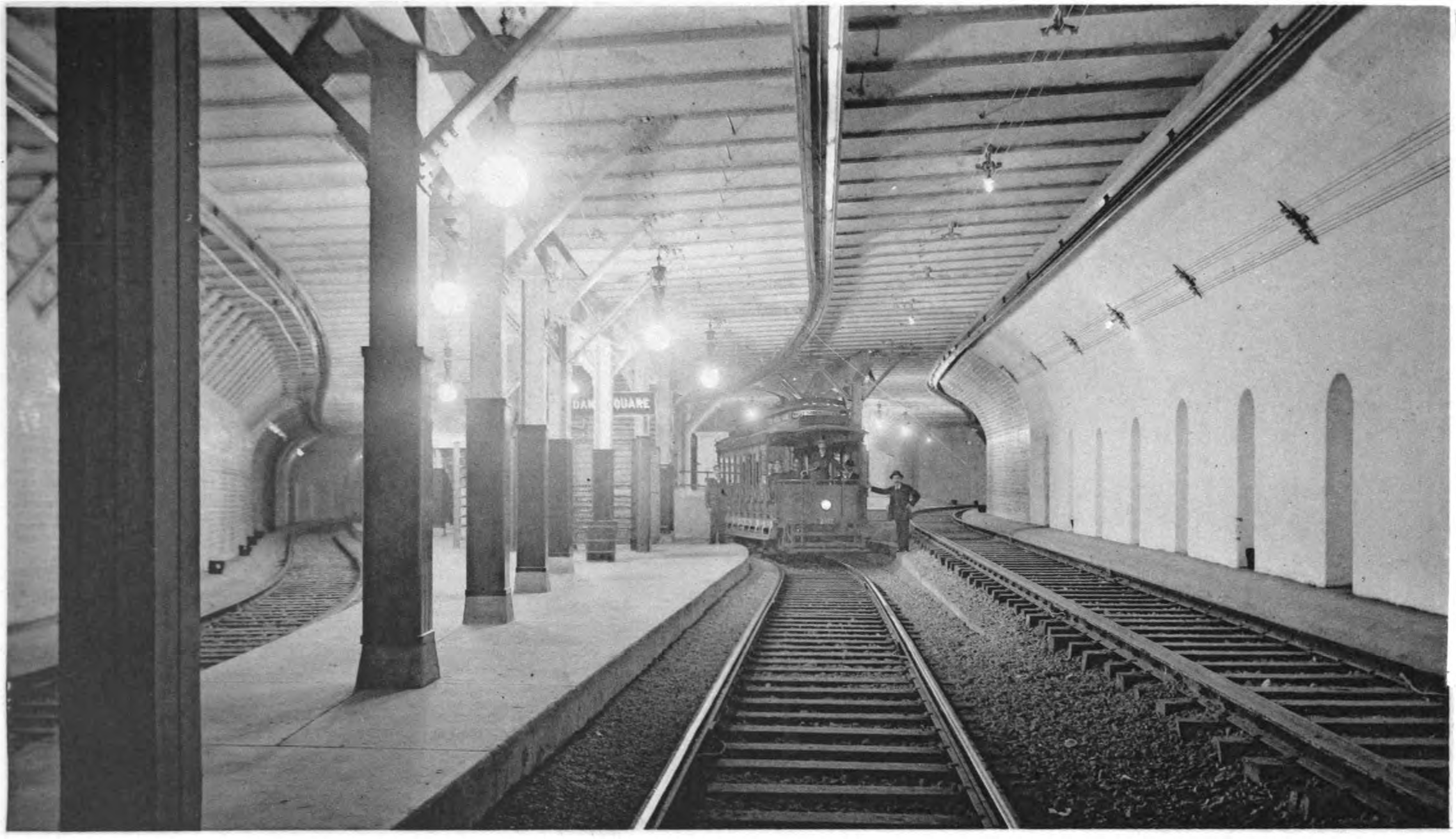
- Adams Square station in 1897

General information
- Coordinates: 42°21′36.65″N 71°3′25.99″W
- Owner: Massachusetts Bay Transportation Authority
- Line: Tremont Street subway

History
- Opened: September 3, 1898
- Closed: October 28, 1963

Services
Preceding station	Boston Elevated Railway	Following station
Scollay Square One-way operation	Tremont Street subway	Haymarket toward North Station
Scollay Square One-way operation	Main Line Elevated 1901-1908	Haymarket toward Sullivan Square
Location

Adams Square was an underground streetcar station located at Adams Square in downtown Boston, Massachusetts. It opened in 1898 and was used until 1963.

== History ==
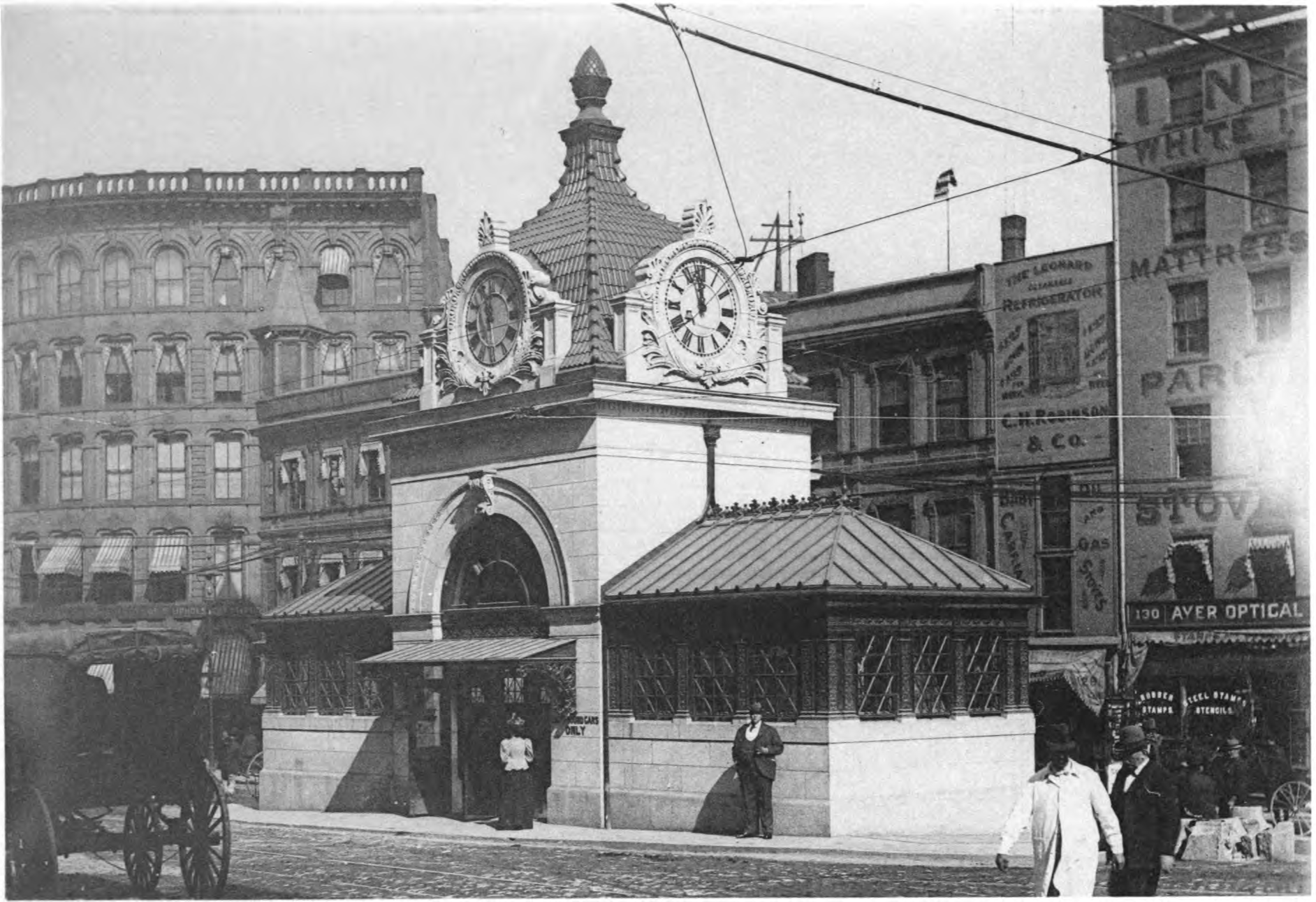
The original headhouse in 1898

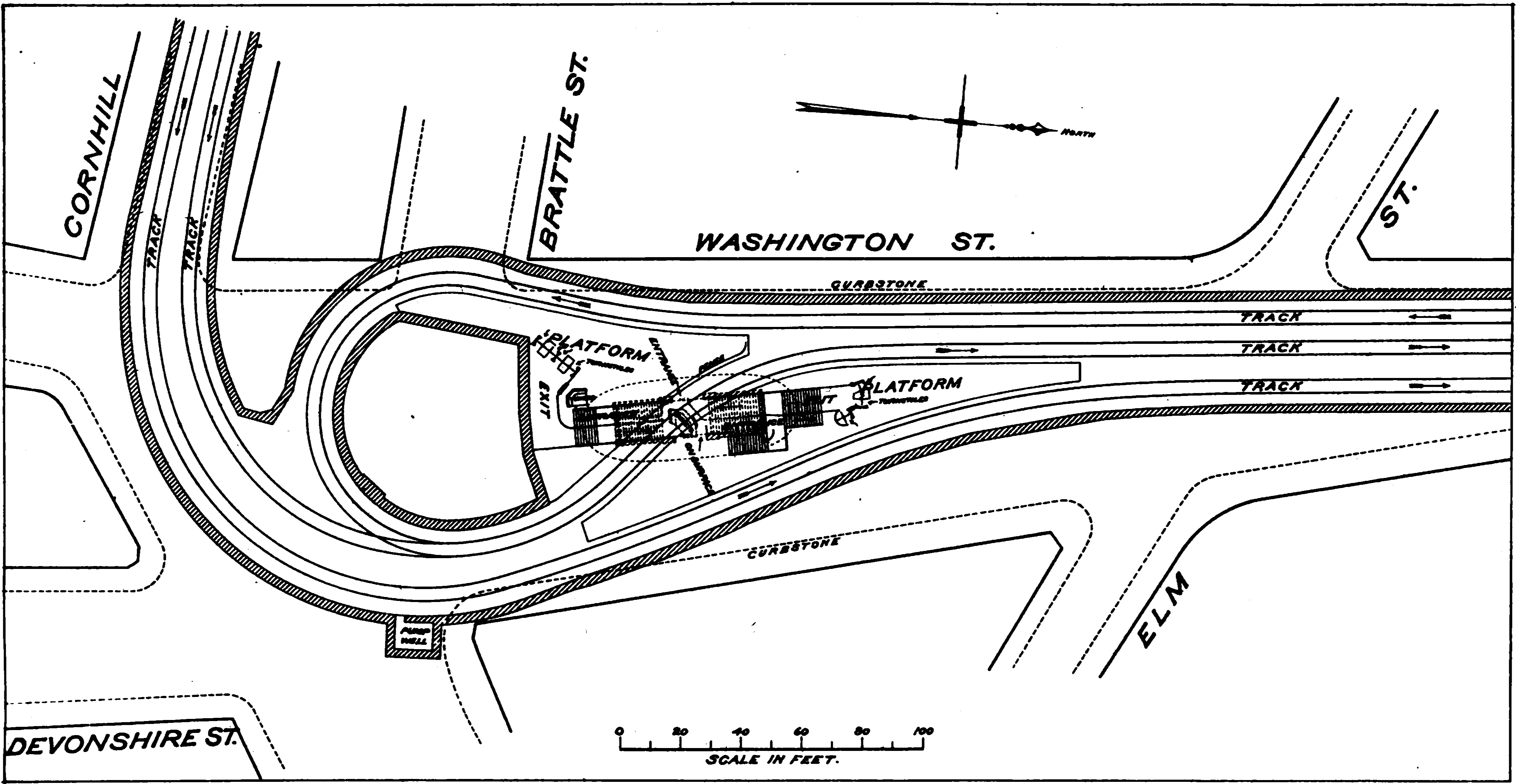
layout of Adams Square station

An unusual northbound-only station, Adams Square station was opened with the rest of the northern section of the Tremont Street subway on September 3, 1898. Initially designed for streetcars only, the station was retrofitted in 1901 to also handle Main Line Elevated trains, which ran through the subway until the completion of the Washington Street tunnel in 1908. Thereafter the station reverted to exclusive streetcar use.

Scollay Square and Adams Square had similar baroque granite headhouses with four-sided clock towers designed by Charles Brigham. A small exit structure was located to the north, while the Brattle Loop used a separate entrance built into a building at Court Street and Brattle Street. The headhouses of the Tremont Street subway were sharply criticized as "pretentiously monumental", with the Scollay Square headhouse compared to "an enlarged soda fountain". Later stations on the East Boston Tunnel and Washington Street tunnel incorporated this criticism into their more modest headhouses. In 1931, the headhouse was removed to improve visibility for automobile drivers and was replaced by a significantly smaller structure of modern design. (Large headhouses at Scollay Square and Harvard were also torn down for similar reasons in that era.)

Adams Square was closed on October 28, 1963, as part of the Government Center renewal project, and was subsequently largely demolished and covered during the construction of Boston City Hall.
