= Indianhead International School =

Location
- Uijeongbu; South Korea; 37°42′32″N 127°2′35″E

Information
- Type: Private School
- Faculty: 8
- Grades: Pre-K - 12
- Enrollment: 52
- Mascot: Wolverines

Indianhead International School is located in Howon-Dong, Uijeongbu, South Korea. It is adjacent to Dobongsan. It is run in conjunction with Shin Heung University. The incumbent chairman is Park Jeong-jin, and the ex-chairman of the school is a Korean representative Kang Sung-Jong, of the Democratic Party of South Korea. However, due to an embezzlement scandal involving the former chairman of the school, who channeled approximately 3.6 billion Korean Won of tuition to his personal use, the school's reputation plummeted and its budget was crippled. Several teachers have also complained implicitly that they have not been compensated for their work a number of years ago. Reports say that the teacher situation in regards to pay was resolved around 2007. A sizeable portion of the parents and the students left Indianhead International School, with some headed to Korean public schools while others, to other international schools in Korea.

During the academic year of 2010–11, chairman Park Jeong-Jin, a relative of Rep. Kang Sung-Jong, declared that the school will move to Jeju Island and double the tuition fee; the Parent-Teacher Association responded with dissent both within and against the chairman and many parents have said that they will leave to other educational institutions. Although the consensus of the Parent-Teacher Association was that the school should continue to operate, many members in the PTA disagreed on the means by which the school should be restored to its normal function.

Most recently, Indianhead International School declined the opportunity to continue administering the SATs as they no longer have the personnel to staff the events. Since an international school is required to replace Indianhead International School as an SAT test center, the International Christian School in Uijeongbu was assigned as the new testing center in the region.

It is estimated that, due to lack of families contributing their tuition fees, the Indianhead International School will cease to function after the graduating class of 2012 or 2013.

== See also ==
- List of International Schools
