= Oldham Pond (Massachusetts) =

Lake in Massachusetts, US

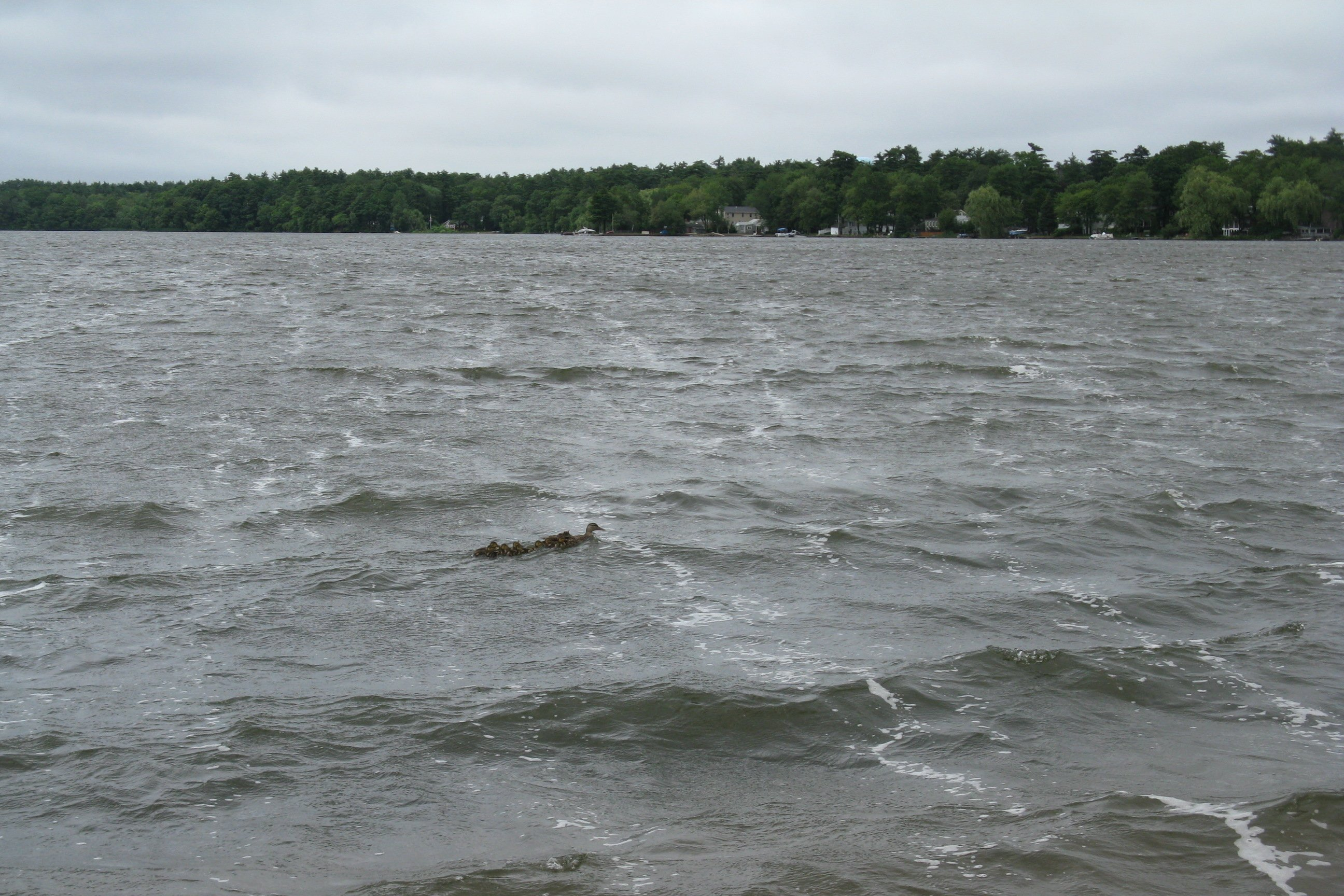
- Oldham Pond

- Location within Massachusetts Location within the United States
- Location: Pembroke and Hanson, Massachusetts
- Coordinates: 42°04′00″N 70°50′10″W
- Basin countries: United States
- Surface area: 232 acres (94 ha)
- Islands: Monument Island
- Settlements: Oldham Village, Oldham Pines

Oldham Pond is a 232-acre (0.94 km^{2}) pond in Pembroke and Hanson, Massachusetts, USA. The pond is a tributary to Furnace Pond. There are three islands located in the middle of the pond, the largest of which is named Monument Island. On the Pembroke side of the pond, Oldham Village lies along the eastern shore, and Oldham Pines lies along the northeastern shore. Camp Pembroke, an all-girls Jewish summer camp, is located on this pond. The first camp out of Troop 1 Hanover, one of the oldest troops in Massachusetts, was held here in 1912.
