= KPYM =

KPYM may refer to:

- KPYM (FM), a radio station (106.1 FM) licensed to serve Matagorda, Texas, United States
- Plymouth Municipal Airport (Massachusetts) (ICAO code KPYM)
