= South Meadow Pond =

Pond in Massachusetts, United States

- Location within Massachusetts
- Location: Carver, Massachusetts
- Coordinates: 41°53′48″N 70°44′17″W
- Basin countries: United States
- Surface area: 17 acres (6.9 ha)

South Meadow Pond is a 17-acre (69,000 m^{2}) pond in Carver, Massachusetts, United States. The pond is located southwest of Plymouth Municipal Airport. The pond is the gateway to South Meadow Village, a community limited to people age 55 and over. It has an abundance of pickerel, some ranging to 24 inches. It is a very weedy pond, difficult to fish and best fished from a canoe.
