= Rising Tide Charter Public School =

Coordinates: 41°57′19.45″N 70°41′55.38″W

- 59 Armstrong Road (Middle and High School); Plymouth, MA 02360; CCTE Region: Southeast; Plymouth, Plymouth, Massachusetts; United States

Information
- Type: Public charter
- Established: 1998; 28 years ago
- School district: Rising Tide Charter Public School
- NCES School ID: 2500057
- Principal: Zahra Williams
- Head of school: Michael O'Keefe; Jill S. Crafts (Former)
- Teaching staff: 43.9 Licensed Teachers
- Grades: 5-12
- Enrollment: 610 (2025-26)
  - Grade 5: 90
  - Grade 6: 96
  - Grade 7: 96
  - Grade 8: 93
  - Grade 9: 59
  - Grade 10: 64
  - Grade 11: 53
  - Grade 12: 59
- Student to teacher ratio: 11.0:1
- Colors: Dark Blue, Grey
- Mascot: Herron
- Budget: $11,065,680.00 (2024)
- Website: Rising Tide Charter

Rising Tide Charter Public School is a public charter middle and high school located on 59 Armstrong Road in Plymouth, Massachusetts. The school was founded in 1998.

== Academics ==
Each student must pass twenty-eight credits for graduation from the high school at Rising Tide. Full-year courses are given one credit. Semester courses are given a half credit. Once a student is enrolled at Rising Tide, only credit earned at Rising Tide is accepted for the student’s graduation requirements. Each student must also earn a competency determination from the state in English, Mathematics, and Science and Technology/Engineering.

== Athletics ==
Rising Tide is a member of the Massachusetts Interscholastic Athletic Association (MIAA). The school offers varsity sports in soccer, golf, cross country, volleyball, basketball, indoor track & field, baseball, softball, and tennis.
