= Plymouth, Massachusetts =

- Town
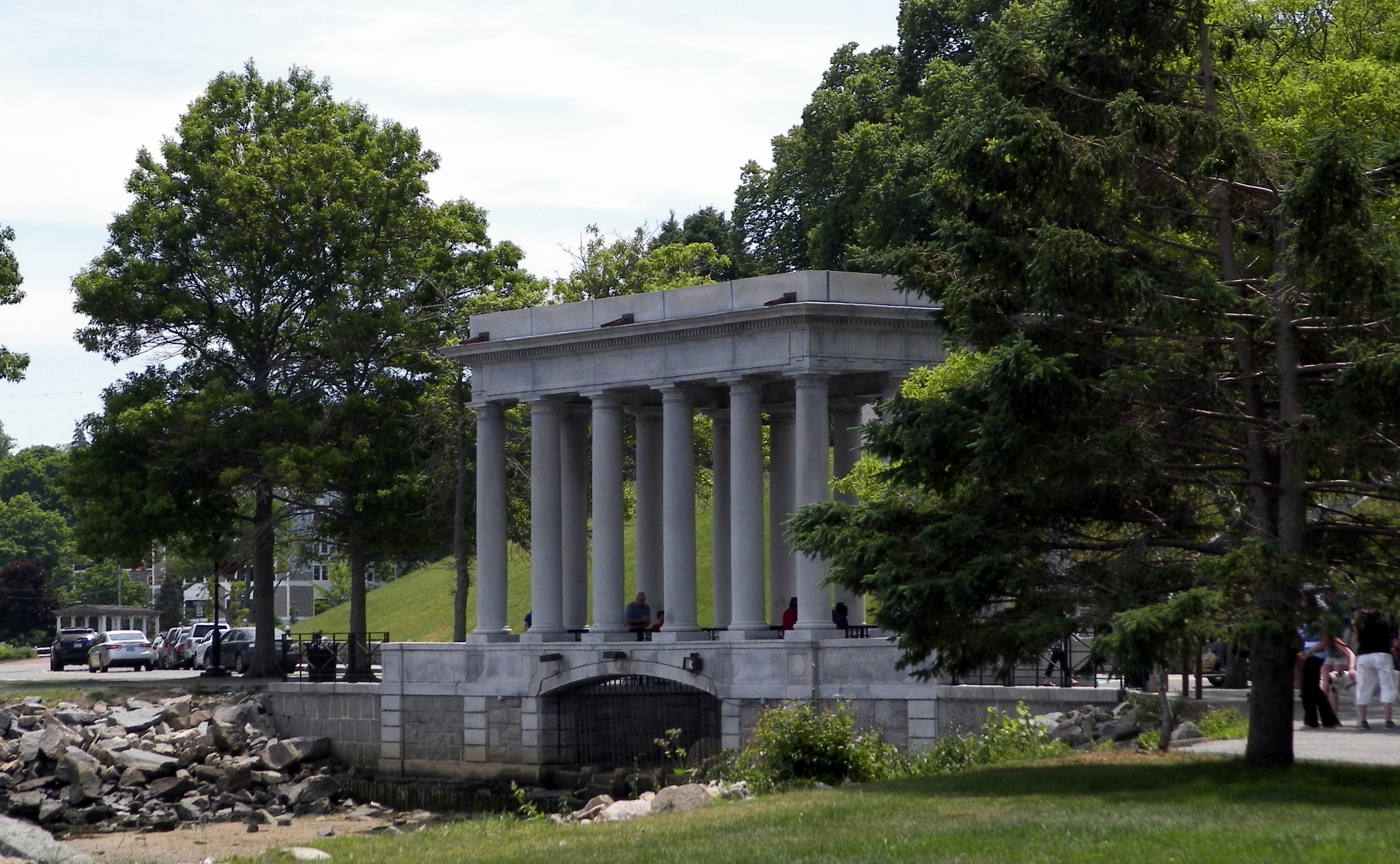
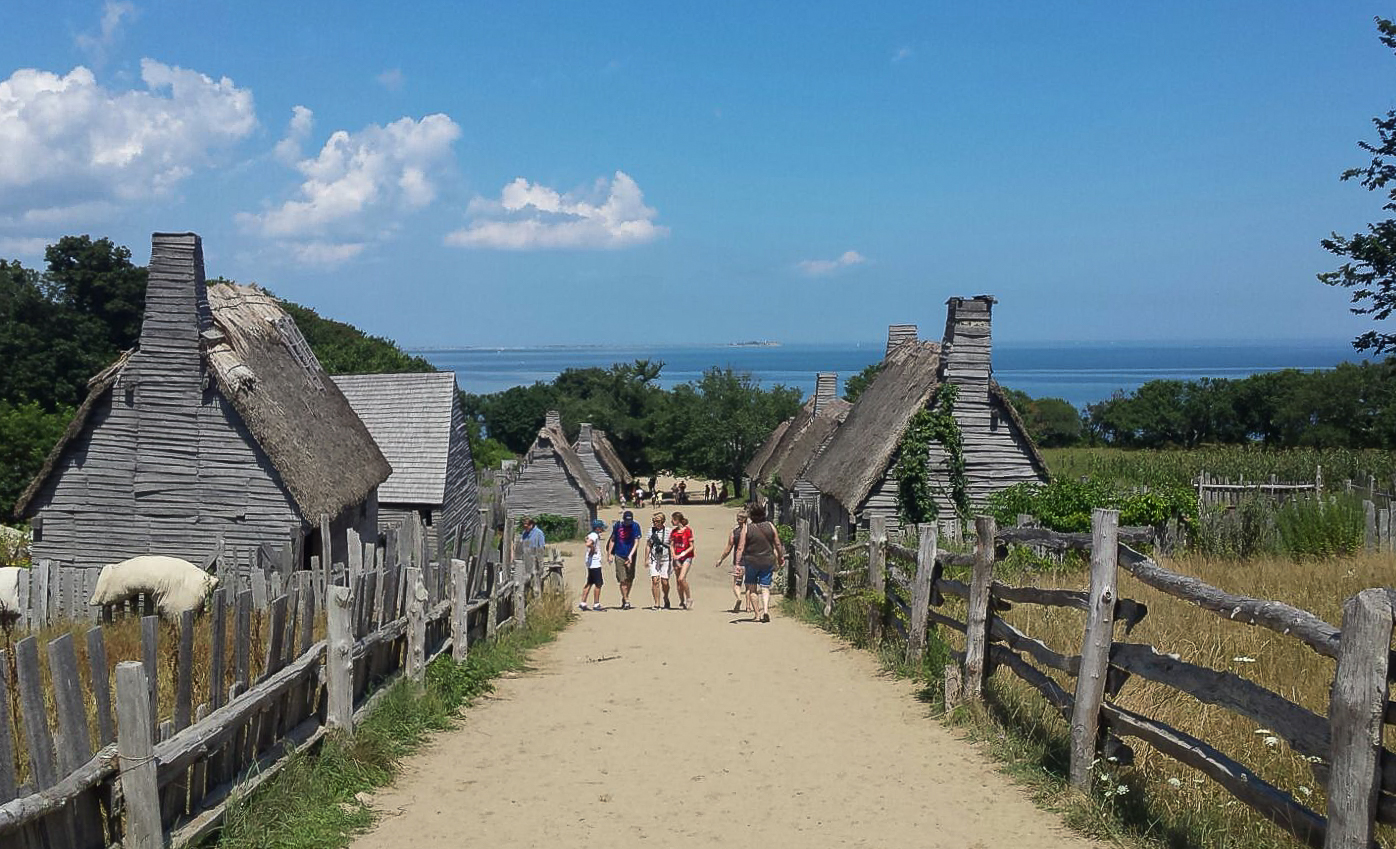
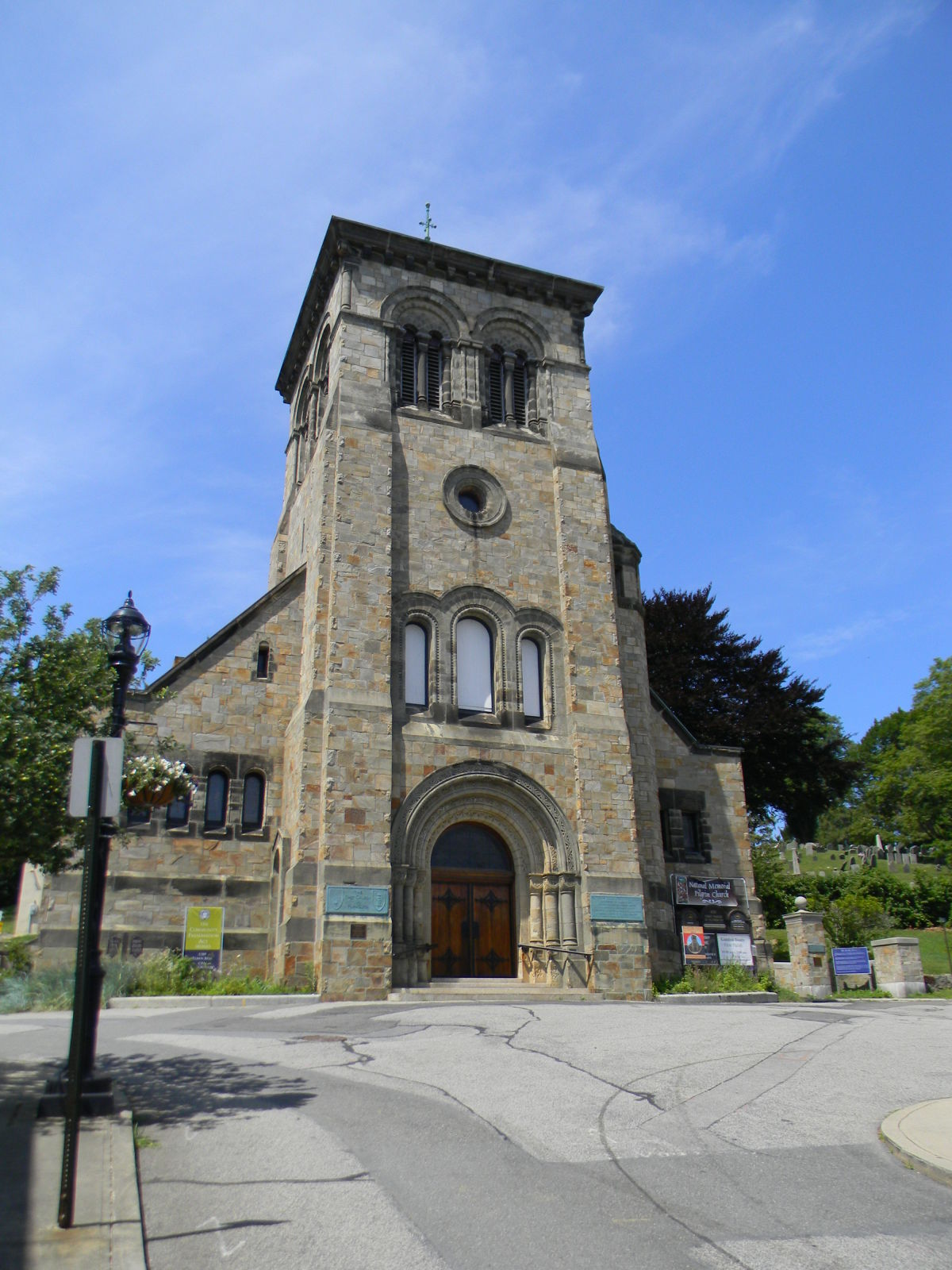
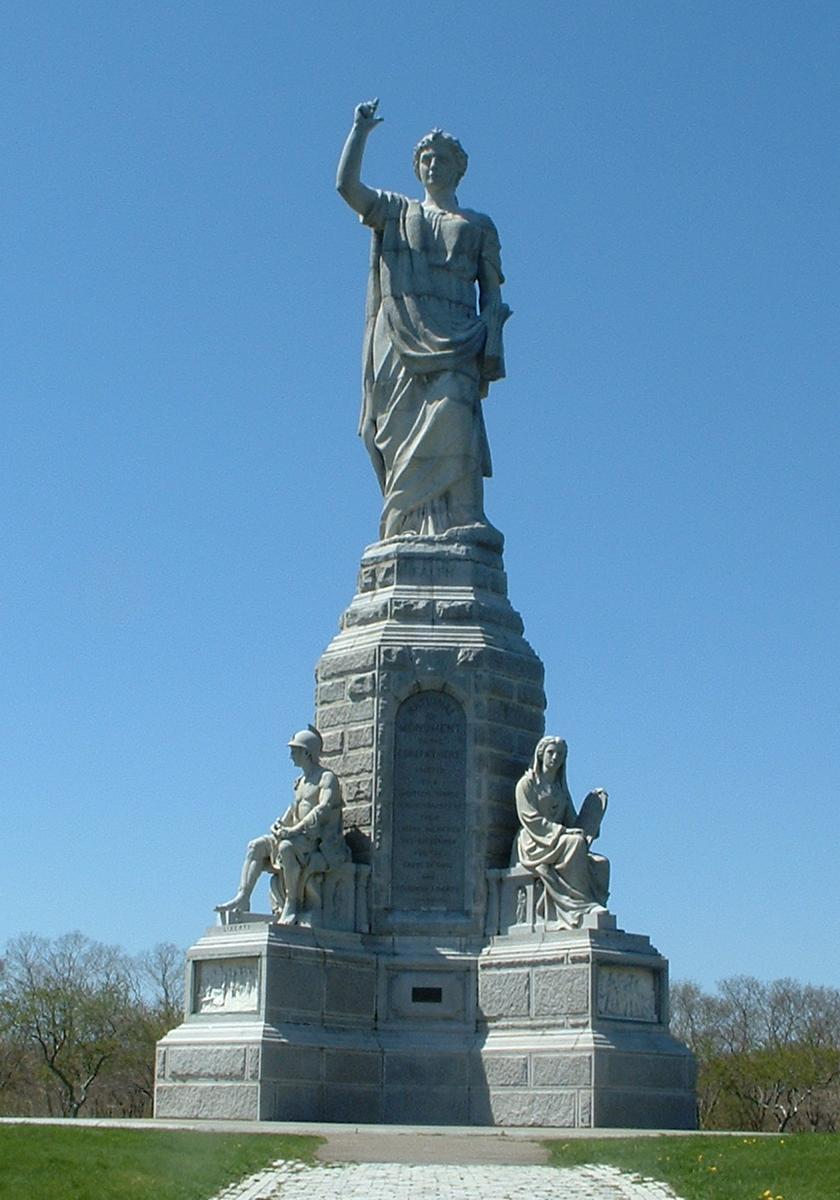
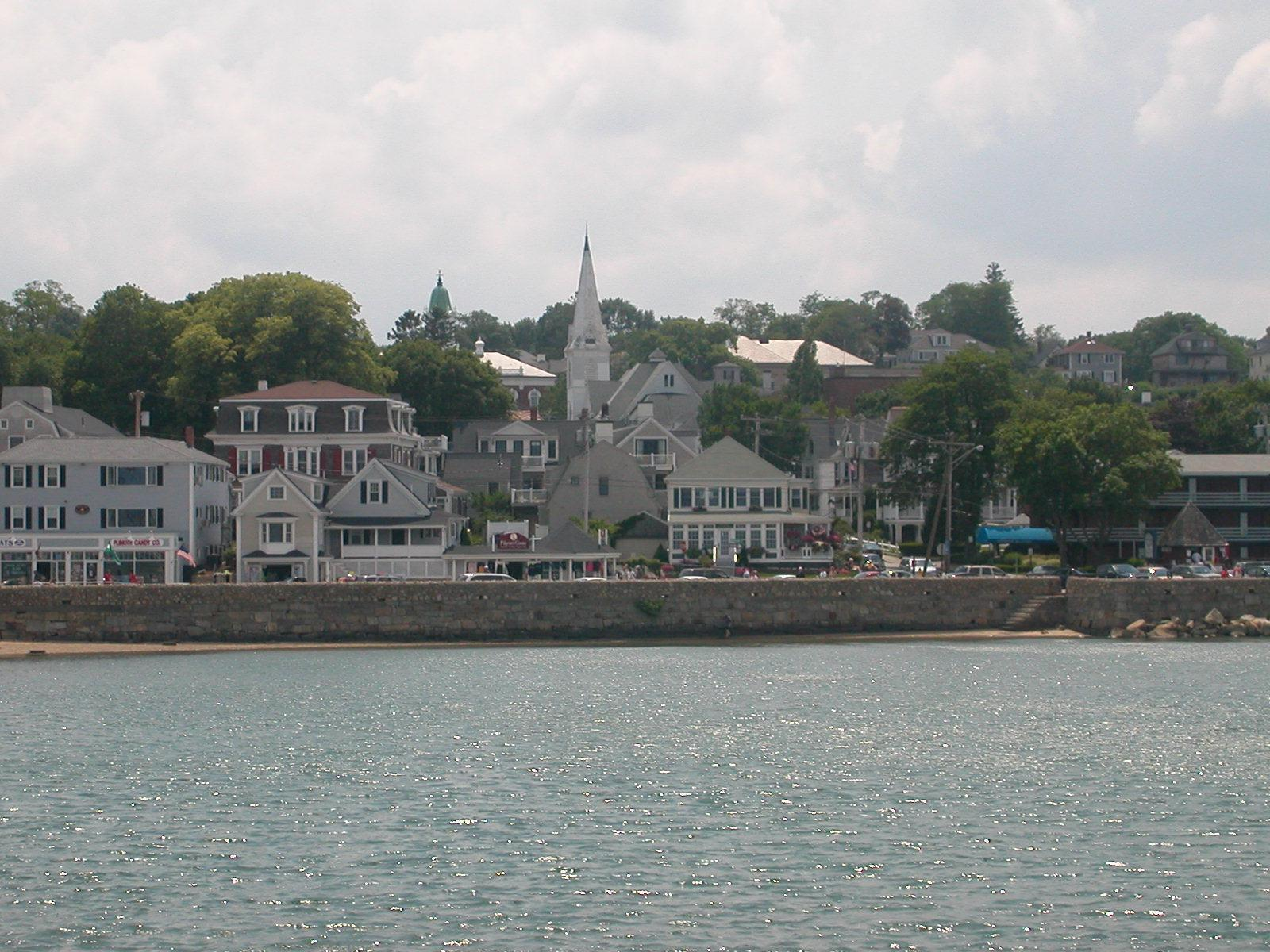
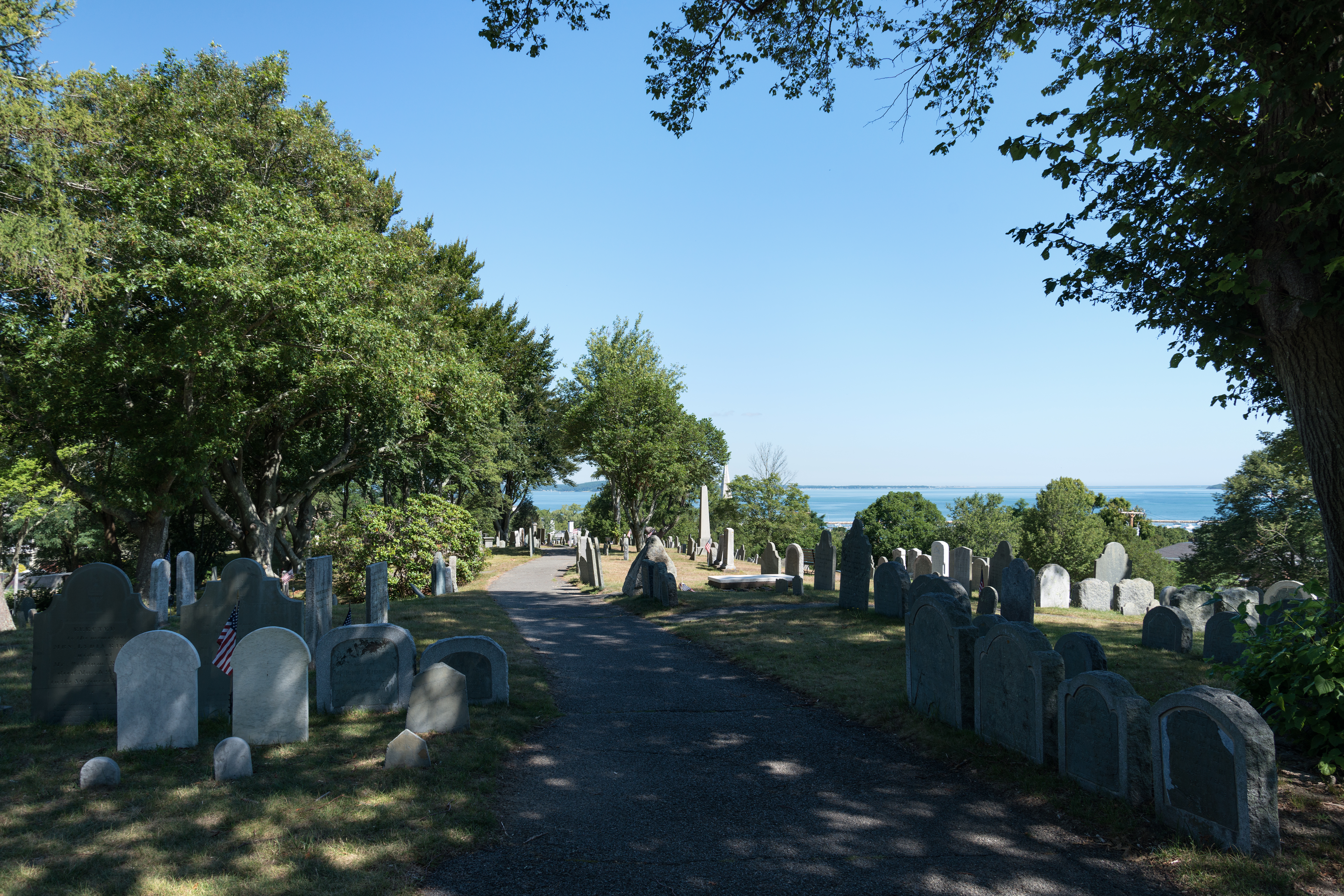
- Clockwise from top left: Plymouth Rock monument, Plimoth Patuxet, National Monument to the Forefathers, Burial Hill, Town Center, First Parish Church in Plymouth

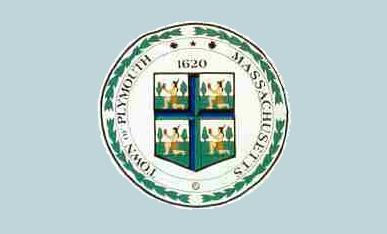
- Flag Seal
- Nickname: America's Hometown
- Location in Plymouth County, Massachusetts

- Location within Massachusetts Location within the United States
- Coordinates: 41°57′30″N 70°40′04″W
- Country: United States
- State: Massachusetts
- County: Plymouth
- Region: New England
- Settled: 1620
- Incorporated: 1620
- Named for: Plymouth, England

Government
  - Type: Representative town meeting
  - Town Manager: Derek Brindisi
  - Selectboard Chair: Kevin B. Canty

Area
  - Total: 134.0 sq mi (347.0 km^{2})
  - Land: 96.4 sq mi (249.8 km^{2})
  - Water: 37.5 sq mi (97.2 km^{2})
- Elevation: 187 ft (57 m)

Population (2020)
  - Total: 61,217
  - Density: 635/sq mi (245.1/km^{2})
- Time zone: UTC-5 (Eastern)
  - Summer (DST): UTC-4 (Eastern)
- ZIP Codes: 02360–02362 (Plymouth); 02345 (Manomet); 02381 (White Horse Beach)
- Area code: 508/774
- FIPS code: 25-54310
- GNIS feature ID: 0618349
- Website: www.plymouth-ma.gov

Plymouth (/ˈplɪməθ/ PLIM-əth; historically also spelled as Plimouth and Plimoth) is a town in and the county seat of Plymouth County, Massachusetts, United States. Located in Greater Boston, the town holds a place of great prominence in American history, folklore, and culture, and is known as "America's Hometown". Plymouth was the site of the colony founded in 1620 by the Mayflower Pilgrims, where New England was first established. It is the oldest municipality in New England and one of the oldest in the United States. The town has served as the location of several prominent events, one of the more notable being the First Thanksgiving feast. Plymouth served as the capital of Plymouth Colony from its founding in 1620 until the colony's merger with the Massachusetts Bay Colony in 1691. The English explorer John Smith named the area Plymouth (after the city in South West England) and the region 'New England' during his voyage of 1614 (the accompanying map was published in 1616). It was a later coincidence that, after an aborted attempt to make the 1620 trans-Atlantic crossing from Southampton, the Mayflower finally set sail for America from Plymouth, England.

Plymouth is located approximately 40 miles (64 km) south of Boston in a region known as the South Shore. Throughout the 19th century, the town thrived as a center of rope making, fishing, and shipping, and was home to the Plymouth Cordage Company, formerly the world's largest rope making company. It continues to be an active port, but today its major industry is healthcare and social services. The town is served by Plymouth Municipal Airport and contains the Pilgrim Hall Museum, the oldest continually operating museum in the United States. It is the largest municipality in Massachusetts by area, and the largest in southern New England. The population was 61,217 at the 2020 U.S. census. It is one of two seats of Plymouth County, the other being Brockton.

== History ==
=== Pre-colonial era ===
Prior to the arrival of the Pilgrims, the location of Plymouth was a village of the Wampanoag tribe called Patuxet. The region was visited twice by European explorers prior to the establishment of Plymouth Colony. In 1605, French explorer Samuel de Champlain sailed to Plymouth Harbor, calling it Port St. Louis. Captain John Smith was a leader of the colony at Jamestown, Virginia, and he explored parts of Cape Cod Bay and is credited with naming the region "New Plimouth."

Two plagues afflicted coastal New England in 1614 and 1617, killing between 90% and 95% of the local Wampanoag inhabitants. The near destruction of the tribe from disease resulted in their cornfields and cleared areas being vacant for the Pilgrims to occupy.

=== Colonial era ===
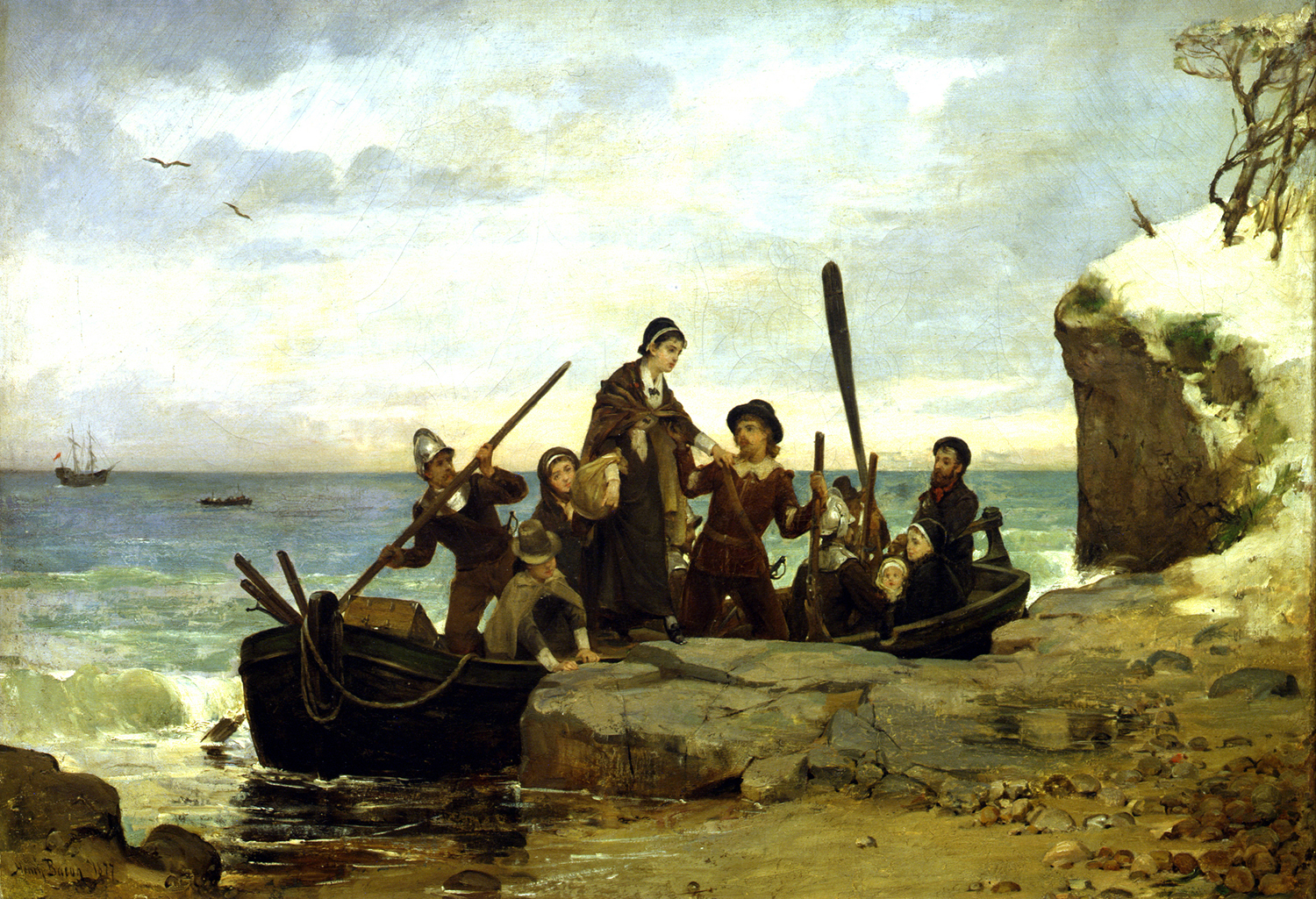
The Landing of the Pilgrims (1877) by Henry A. Bacon. The Pilgrims are traditionally said to have landed at Plymouth Rock

Plymouth played a very important role in American colonial history. It was the final landing site of the first voyage of the Mayflower and the location of the original settlement of Plymouth Colony. Plymouth was established in December 1620 by separatist Puritans who had broken away from the Church of England, believing that the Church had not completed the work of the Protestant Reformation. Today, these settlers are better known as the "Pilgrims", a term coined by William Bradford.

The Mayflower first anchored in the harbor of Provincetown, Massachusetts on November 11, 1620. The ship was headed for the mouth of the Hudson River (which was in the notional territory of the Colony of Virginia at the time, before the establishment of New Amsterdam) but it did not go beyond Cape Cod. The Pilgrim settlers realized that they did not have a patent to settle in the region, so they signed the Mayflower Compact prior to disembarking. They explored various parts of Cape Cod and eventually sought a suitable location for a permanent settlement to the westward in Cape Cod Bay. They discovered the sheltered waters of Plymouth Harbor on December 17. From the protected bay they found a site for the new settlement after three days of surveying.

The settlers officially disembarked on December 21, 1620. It is traditionally said that the Pilgrims first set foot in America at the site of Plymouth Rock, though no historical evidence exists in support of this claim.

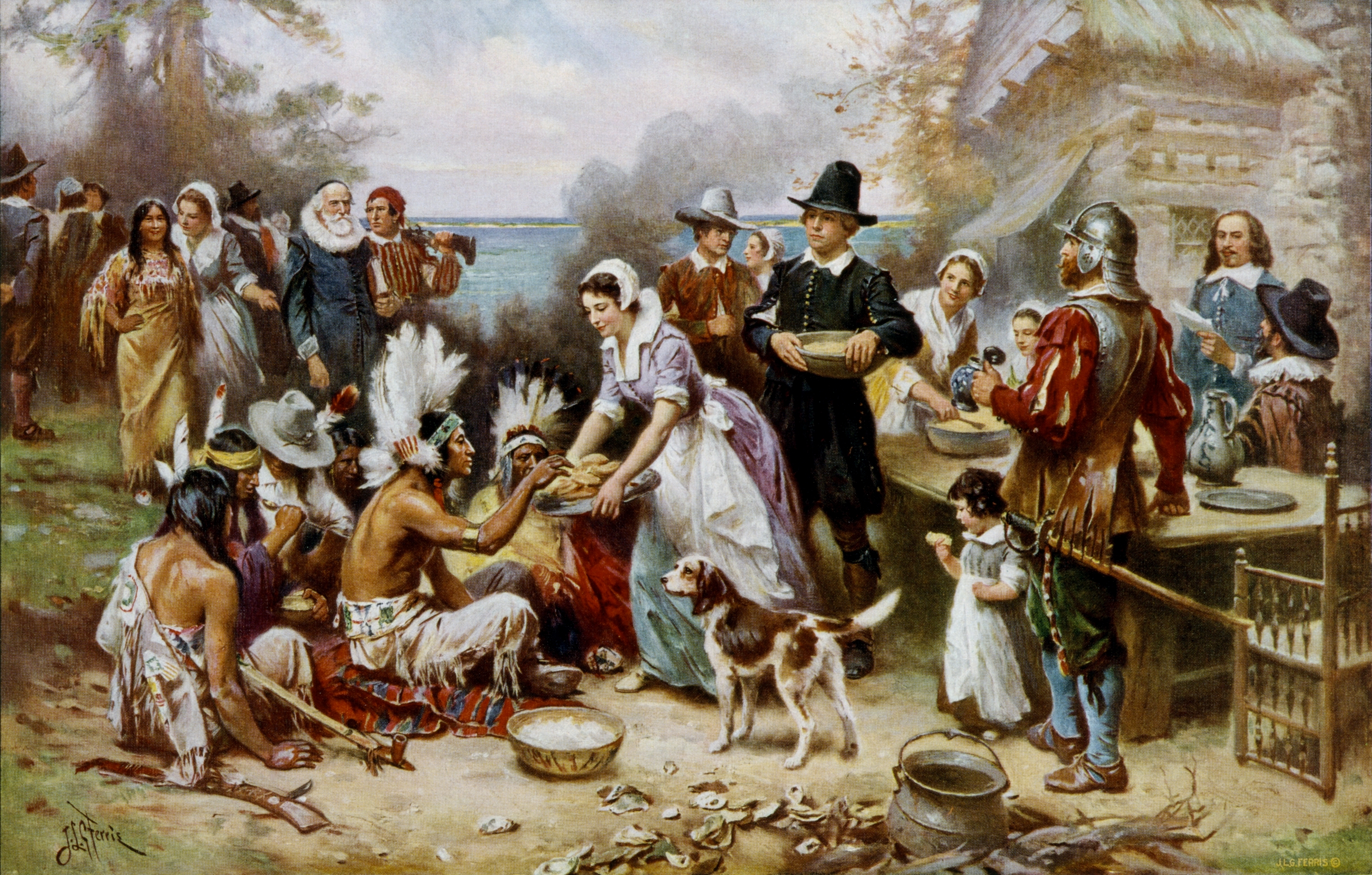
The First Thanksgiving, painted by Jean Leon Gerome Ferris (1863–1930). The First Thanksgiving took place in Plymouth in 1621

==== First winter ====
The Plymouth colony faced many difficulties during its first winter, the most notable being the risk of starvation and the lack of suitable shelter. From the beginning, the colonists depended on the assistance of Native Americans. One colonist's journal reports:

We marched to the place we called Cornhill, where we had found the corn before. At another place we had seen before, we dug and found some more corn, two or three baskets full, and a bag of beans. ... In all we had about ten bushels, which will be enough for seed. It is with God's help that we found this corn, for how else could we have done it, without meeting some Indians who might trouble us.

During their earlier exploration of the Cape, the Pilgrims had come upon a Native American burial site containing corn, and they had taken the corn for future planting. On another occasion, they found an unoccupied house and took corn and beans, for which they repaid the occupants about six months later.

Even greater assistance came from Samoset and Tisquantum (known as Squanto by the Pilgrims), a Native American sent by Wampanoag Chief Massasoit as an ambassador and technical adviser. Squanto had been kidnapped in 1614 by a colonist and sold into slavery in Málaga, Spain. With the help of another colonist, he escaped slavery, and returned home in 1619. He taught the colonists how to farm corn, where and how to catch fish, and other helpful skills for the New World. He also was instrumental in the survival of the settlement for the first two years.

Squanto and Hobomok, another guide sent by Massasoit in 1621, helped the colonists set up trading posts for furs. Chief Massasoit later formed a Peace Treaty with the Pilgrims. Upon growing a plentiful harvest in the fall of 1621, the Pilgrims gathered with Squanto, Samoset, Massasoit, and ninety other Wampanoag men in a celebration of thanksgiving to God for their plentiful harvest. This celebration is known today as the First Thanksgiving. It is commemorated annually in downtown Plymouth with a parade and a reenactment. Since 1941, the United States has observed Thanksgiving as a federal holiday.

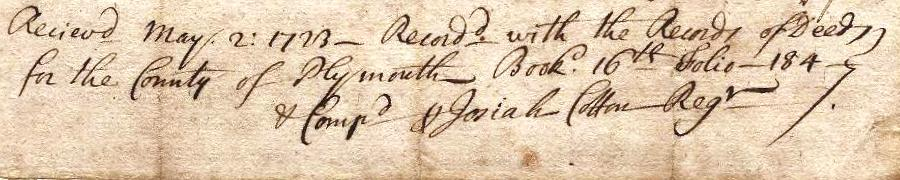
An 18th century Plymouth deed signed by Josiah Cotton as Register of Deeds

Plymouth served as the capital of Plymouth Colony (which consisted of modern-day Barnstable, Bristol, and Plymouth counties) from its founding in 1620 until 1691, when the colony was merged with the Massachusetts Bay Colony and other territories to form the Province of Massachusetts Bay. Plymouth holds the distinction of being the first permanent European settlement in New England, and one of the oldest European settlements in what is now the United States.

=== Revolutionary War ===
During the Revolutionary War, the Plymouth County militia was led by Colonel Theophilus Cotton of Plymouth. News reached Plymouth of the Battles of Concord and Lexington, and Cotton gathered his soldiers and marched on the town of Marshfield. A small British barracks had been established there on the estate of Nathaniel Ray Thomas, known today as the Daniel Webster Estate. Cotton's forces surrounded the British troops, but Cotton determined not to fire, allowing the British to escape by water down the Green Harbor River and back to the security of the British forces occupying Boston.

=== 19th century ===
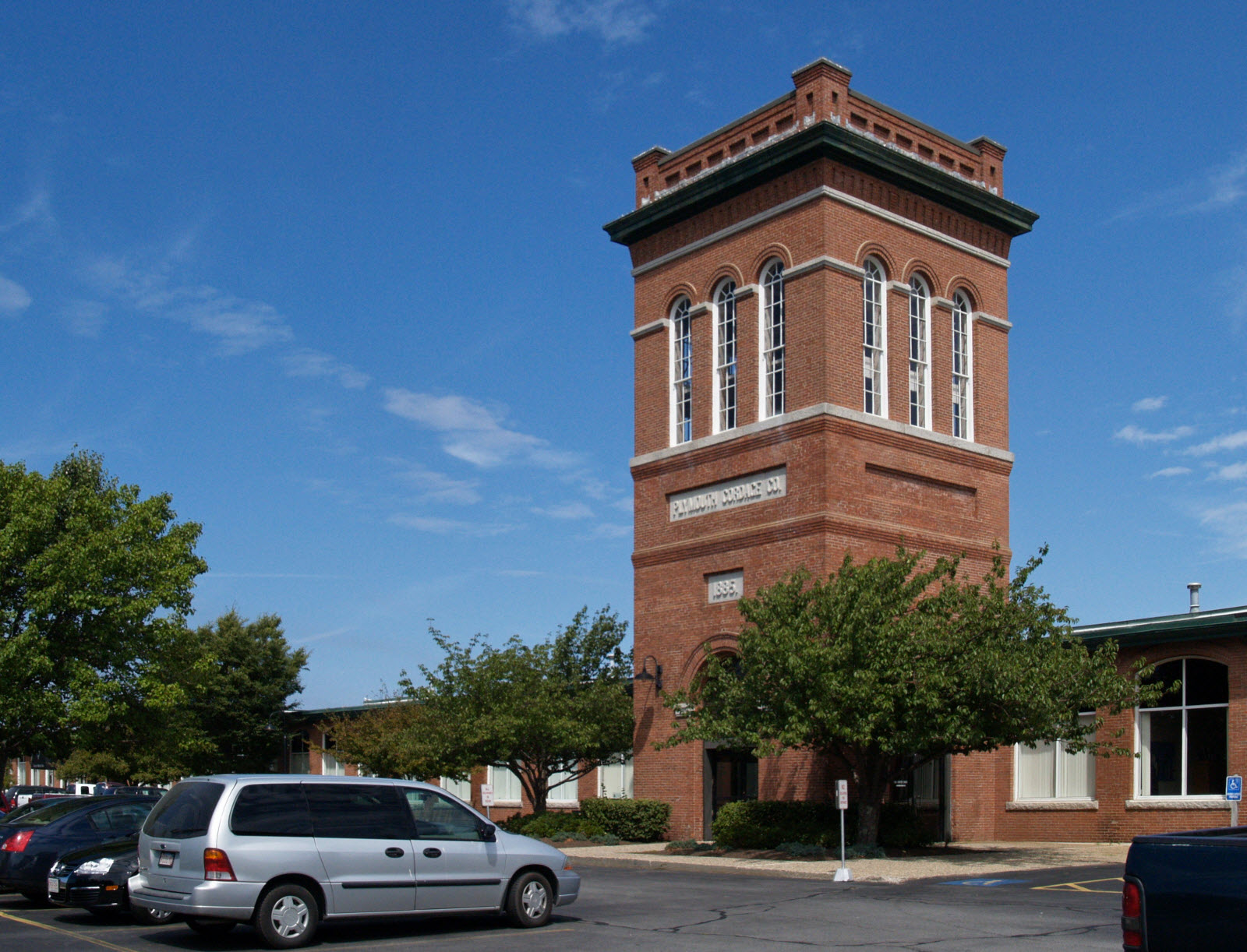
Cordage Commerce Center, North Plymouth

In the 1800s, Plymouth remained a relatively isolated seacoast town whose livelihood depended on fishing and shipping. The town eventually became a regional center of shipbuilding and fishing. Its principal industry was the Plymouth Cordage Company, founded in 1824, which became the world's largest manufacturer of rope and cordage products. At one point, the longest ropewalk in the world was found on the Cordage Company's site on the North Plymouth waterfront, a quarter-mile (0.4 km) in length. The company thrived into the 1960s, but was forced out of business in 1964 due to competition from synthetic-fiber ropes. The factory has been renovated for use as numerous offices, restaurants, and stores, and is known as Cordage Commerce Center.

=== Modern history ===
Plymouth has enjoyed rapid growth and development since the late twentieth century. It became more accessible to Boston in the early 1970s with improved railroads, highways, and bus routes, and the town's inexpensive land costs and low tax rates were factors in attracting thousands of new residents. Its population grew from 18,606 residents in 1970 to 45,608 residents in 1990, a 145% increase in 20 years. Plymouth has surpassed several Massachusetts cities in population, but it is still officially regarded as a town and continues to be governed by a board of selectmen rather than a mayor.

Plymouth spans several exits on the town's primary highway Massachusetts Route 3. Additional access is possible via an extension to U.S. Route 44.

== Geography ==
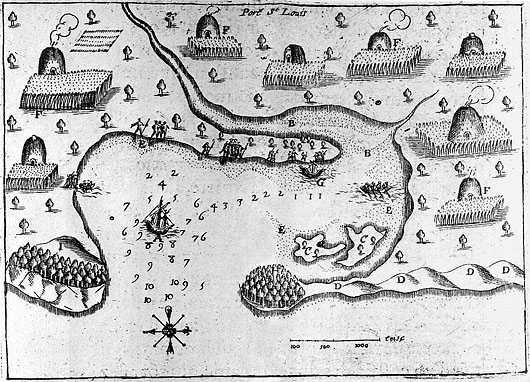
Samuel Champlain's 1605 map of Plymouth Harbor

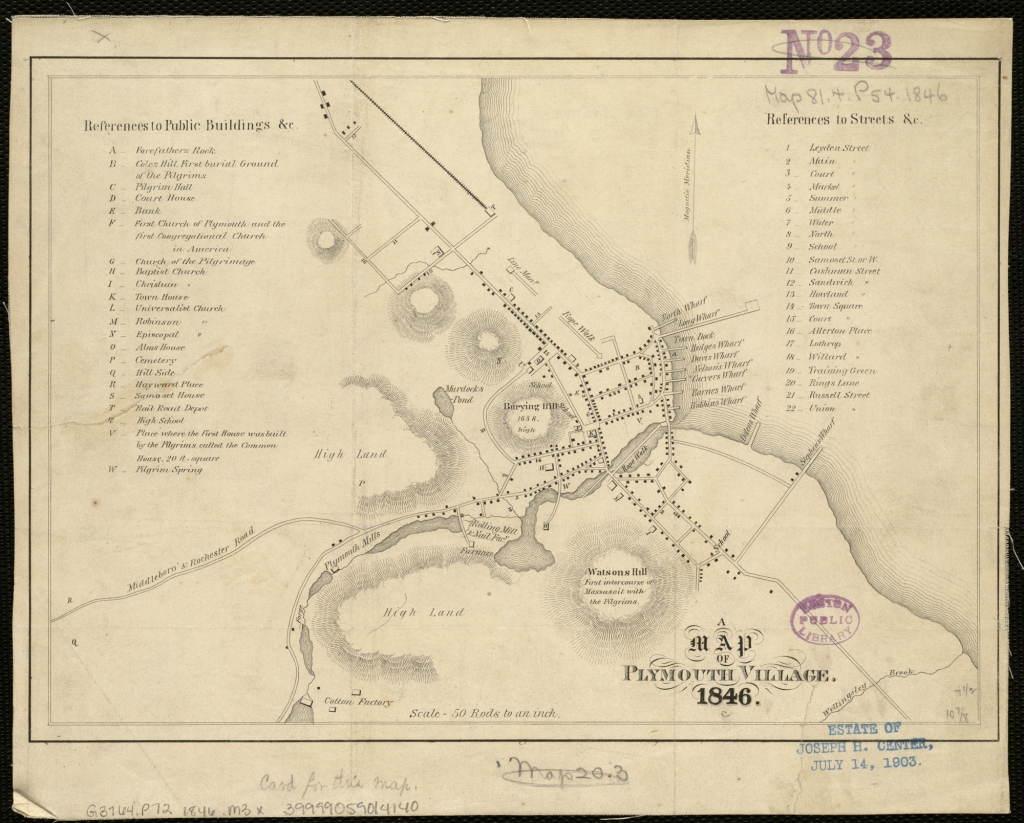
1846 map of Plymouth Harbor

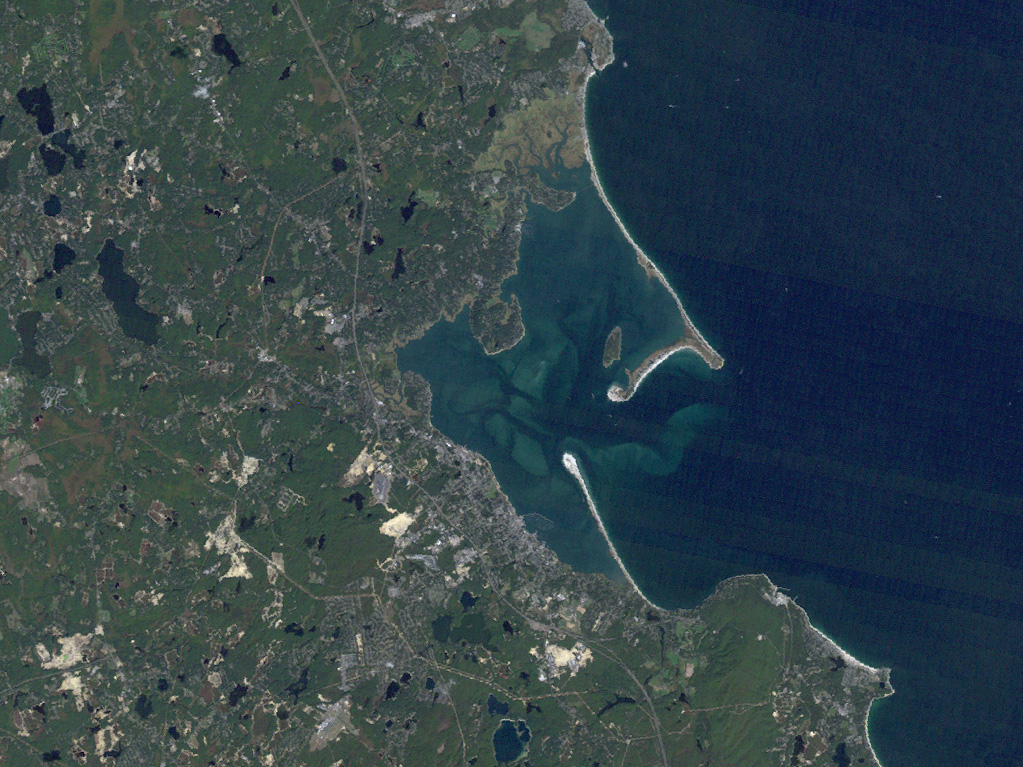
A simulated-color satellite image of the Plymouth Bay region taken on NASA's Landsat 3

The latitude of Plymouth is 41.95833 and its longitude is −70.66778. According to the United States Census Bureau, the town has a total area of 134.0 sq mi (347 km^{2}), of which 96.5 sq mi (250 km^{2}) is land, and 37.5 sq mi (97 km^{2}) (28%) is water.

With the largest land area of any municipality in Massachusetts, Plymouth consists of several neighborhoods and geographical sections. Larger localities in the town include Plymouth Center, North, West and South Plymouth, Manomet, and Cedarville.

Plymouth makes up the entire western shore of Cape Cod Bay. It is bordered on land by Bourne to the southeast, Wareham to the southwest, Carver to the west, and Kingston to the north. It also shares a small border with Duxbury at the land entrance of Saquish Neck. Plymouth's border with Bourne makes up most of the line between Plymouth and Barnstable counties. The town is located roughly 44 miles (71 km) southeast of Boston (it is almost exactly 40 miles (64 km) from Plymouth Rock to the Massachusetts State House) and equidistantly east of Providence, Rhode Island.

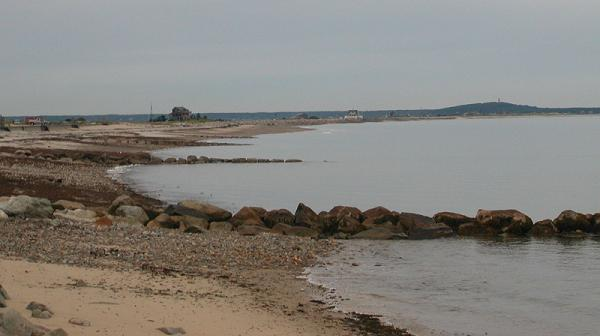
Plymouth Beach, one of Plymouth's many beaches

Located in the Plymouth Pinelands, the town of Plymouth has many distinct geographical features. The town's Atlantic coast is characterized by low plains, while its western sections are extremely hilly and forested. Plymouth contains several small ponds scattered throughout its western quadrant, the largest being the Great Herring Pond (which is partly in the town of Bourne). A major feature of the town is the Myles Standish State Forest, which is in the southwestern region. Cachalot Scout Reservation, operated by the Cachalot District of the Narragansett Council of the Boy Scouts of America, lies adjacent to the state forest lands. There is also a smaller town forest, as well as several parks, recreation areas and beaches.

Plymouth has nine public beaches, the largest being Plymouth Beach. Plymouth Beach guards Plymouth Harbor and consists mostly of a three-mile (5 km) long, ecologically significant barrier beach. Clark's Island, a small island in Plymouth Bay, is the only island in Plymouth. It is off the coast of Saquish Neck and has nine summer houses but no year-round inhabitants.

== Climate ==
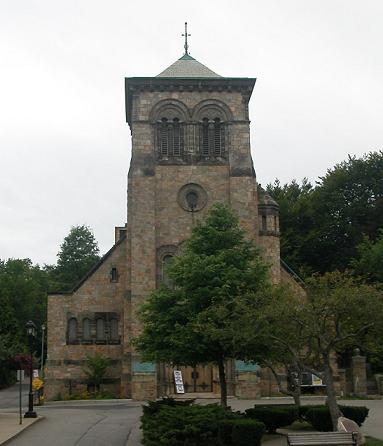
The First Parish Church in Plymouth is located in Plymouth Center

Plymouth has a hot summer humid continental climate (Dfa) which is the predominant climate for Massachusetts. Due to its location on the Atlantic Ocean, humidity levels can be very high year-round. Plymouth's coastal location causes it to experience warmer temperatures than many inland locations in New England. Summers are typically hot and humid, while winters are cold, windy and often snowy.

Plymouth's warmest month is July, with an average high temperature of 84.0 °F (28.9 °C) and an average low of 64.1 °F (17.8 °C). The coldest month is January, with an average high temperature of 41.0 °F (5.0 °C) and an average low of 21.8 °F (−5.7 °C).

Much like the rest of the Northeastern seaboard, Plymouth receives ample amounts of precipitation year-round. On average, summer months receive slightly less precipitation than winter months. Plymouth averages about 52.8 inches (1,340 mm) of precipitation a year. Plymonth gets the most snowfall in February, with 29 centimetres (11.4 in). Plymouth, like other coastal Massachusetts towns, is very vulnerable to Nor'easter weather systems. The town is sometimes vulnerable to Atlantic hurricanes and tropical storms, which infrequently threaten the Cape Cod region during the early autumn months.

Climate data for Plymouth/Kingston, Massachusetts (1991–2020 normals, extremes 1905–present
Month	Jan	Feb	Mar	Apr	May	Jun	Jul	Aug	Sep	Oct	Nov	Dec	Year
Record high °F (°C)	70 (21)	71 (22)	87 (31)	94 (34)	95 (35)	102 (39)	102 (39)	102 (39)	100 (38)	87 (31)	82 (28)	77 (25)	102 (39)
Mean daily maximum °F (°C)	41.0 (5.0)	42.8 (6.0)	49.1 (9.5)	59.2 (15.1)	69.1 (20.6)	78.5 (25.8)	84.0 (28.9)	82.3 (27.9)	75.7 (24.3)	65.4 (18.6)	55.1 (12.8)	45.9 (7.7)	62.3 (16.8)
Daily mean °F (°C)	31.4 (−0.3)	33.0 (0.6)	39.0 (3.9)	48.8 (9.3)	58.5 (14.7)	68.3 (20.2)	74.0 (23.3)	72.7 (22.6)	66.3 (19.1)	55.6 (13.1)	45.8 (7.7)	37.1 (2.8)	52.5 (11.4)
Mean daily minimum °F (°C)	21.8 (−5.7)	23.3 (−4.8)	29.0 (−1.7)	38.4 (3.6)	47.9 (8.8)	58.1 (14.5)	64.1 (17.8)	63.2 (17.3)	56.8 (13.8)	45.8 (7.7)	36.4 (2.4)	28.3 (−2.1)	42.8 (6.0)
Record low °F (°C)	−19 (−28)	−15 (−26)	−5 (−21)	13 (−11)	25 (−4)	33 (1)	42 (6)	40 (4)	32 (0)	17 (−8)	3 (−16)	−14 (−26)	−19 (−28)
Average precipitation inches (mm)	4.79 (122)	4.24 (108)	5.80 (147)	4.69 (119)	3.71 (94)	3.80 (97)	3.49 (89)	3.63 (92)	4.27 (108)	5.01 (127)	4.41 (112)	4.93 (125)	52.77 (1,340)
Average snowfall inches (cm)	10.1 (26)	11.5 (29)	8.5 (22)	1.0 (2.5)	0.0 (0.0)	0.0 (0.0)	0.0 (0.0)	0.0 (0.0)	0.0 (0.0)	0.0 (0.0)	0.1 (0.25)	6.7 (17)	37.9 (96)
Average precipitation days (≥ 0.01 in)	12.2	10.8	12.6	11.8	12.6	12.1	10.9	10.8	10.1	12.2	11.6	11.9	139.6
Average snowy days (≥ 0.1 in)	4.7	4.3	3.3	0.2	0.0	0.0	0.0	0.0	0.0	0.0	0.1	2.3	14.9
Source: NOAA

== Demographics ==
Historical population
Year	Pop.	±%
1790	2,995	—
1800	3,524	+17.7%
1810	4,228	+20.0%
1820	4,348	+2.8%
1830	4,758	+9.4%
1840	5,281	+11.0%
1850	6,024	+14.1%
1860	6,272	+4.1%
1870	6,238	−0.5%
1880	7,093	+13.7%
1890	7,314	+3.1%
1900	9,592	+31.1%
1910	12,141	+26.6%
1920	13,045	+7.4%
1930	13,042	−0.0%
1940	13,100	+0.4%
1950	13,608	+3.9%
1960	14,445	+6.2%
1970	18,606	+28.8%
1980	35,913	+93.0%
1990	45,608	+27.0%
2000	51,701	+13.4%
2010	56,468	+9.2%
2020	61,217	+8.4%
2025*	67,846	+10.8%
Source: United States census records and Population Estimates Program data.

Plymouth town, Massachusetts – Racial composition
Race (NH = Non-Hispanic)	2020	2010	2000	1990	1980
White alone (NH)	88.2% (54,012)	92.5% (52,238)	94% (48,599)	95.9% (43,720)	96.5% (34,663)
Black alone (NH)	1.8% (1,089)	2% (1,106)	1.8% (924)	1.7% (782)	1.7% (626)
American Indian alone (NH)	0.2% (106)	0.3% (175)	0.2% (111)	0.2% (99)	0.2% (65)
Asian alone (NH)	1.1% (679)	0.9% (514)	0.6% (292)	0.6% (276)	0.2% (67)
Pacific Islander alone (NH)	0% (5)	0% (22)	0% (17)		
Other race alone (NH)	1.2% (765)	0.8% (471)	0.5% (245)	0.4% (174)	0.6% (209)
Multiracial (NH)	4.5% (2,768)	1.6% (912)	1.2% (643)	—	—
Hispanic/Latino (any race)	2.9% (1,793)	1.8% (1,030)	1.7% (870)	1.2% (557)	0.8% (283)

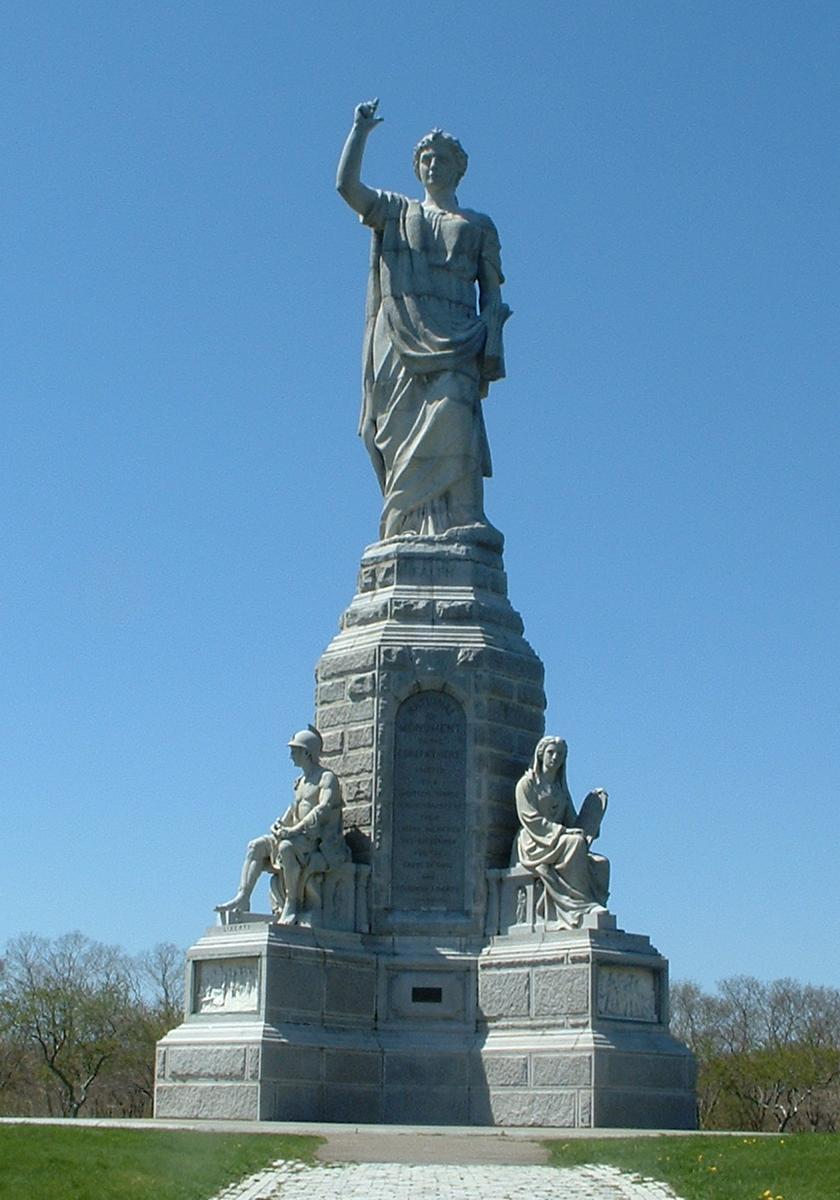
The National Monument to the Forefathers

As of the census of 2010, there were 56,468 people, 21,269 households, and 14,742 families residing in the town; by population it was the largest town in Massachusetts. It was also the 21st–largest municipality in the state. The population density was 536.0 inhabitants per square mile (207.0/km^{2}). There were 21,250 housing units, at an average density of 85.1/km^{2} (220/sq mi). The racial makeup of the town was 94% White, 1.8% Black or African American, 0.3% Native American, 0.7% Asian, <0.1% Pacific Islander, 0.9% from other races, and 1.48% from two or more races. Hispanic or Latino residents of any race were 2% of the population.

There were 21,269 households, out of which 29.5% had children under the age of 18 living with them, 54.6% were married couples living together, 10.8% had a female householder with no husband present, and 30.7% were non-families. 23.7% of all households were made up of individuals, and 10.0% had someone living alone who was 65 years of age or older. The average household size was 2.55 and the average family size was 3.04.

In the town, 24.3% of the population was under the age of 20, 10.7% was from 20 to 29, 28.8% from 30 to 49, 22.2% from 50 to 64, and 14.1% was 65 years of age or older. The median age was 41.4 years.

The median income for a household in the town was $54,677 as of the 2000 census, and the median income for a family was $63,266. Males had a median income of $44,983 versus $31,565 for females. The per capita income for the town was $23,732. About 4.4% of families and 5.4% of the population were below the poverty line, including 7.1% of those under age 18 and 6.9% of those age 65 or over.

== Government ==
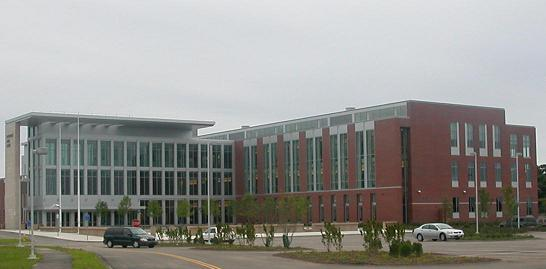
The Plymouth County Courthouse, located in Plymouth

Plymouth is represented in the Massachusetts House of Representatives as a part of the First and Twelfth Plymouth Districts. The town is represented in the Massachusetts Senate as a part of the Plymouth and Barnstable district, which also includes Bourne, Falmouth, Kingston, Pembroke, and Sandwich. On the state level, primary but shared patrolling responsibility of the town's limited access highways falls upon the Seventh (Bourne) Barracks of Troop D of the Massachusetts State Police.

On the national level, Plymouth is a part of Massachusetts's 9th congressional district, and is currently represented by William R. Keating. The state's senior (Class I) member of the United States Senate is Elizabeth Warren. The state's current junior (Class II) Senator is Edward Markey.

On the local level, the town was governed by an open town meeting from 1622 until 1954. In 1953, citizens voted to adopt a representative town meeting form of government, led by a town manager and a board of selectmen. The current town manager of Plymouth is Derek Brindisi.

Plymouth has a centralized municipal police force, the Plymouth Police Department. The town also has a professional fire department, with seven firehouses spread around the town. There are also six post offices for the town's five ZIP codes, with one in the downtown area, one in North Plymouth, one in Manomet, one in White Horse Beach, one near the Plymouth County Jail, and one near the town forest in "The Village Green" shopping area of The Pinehills.

The town has a public library, with a branch location in Manomet. Both libraries are a part of the Old Colony Library Network, which services 28 libraries throughout the South Shore. Additionally, as a seat of Plymouth County, there are several county facilities located in Plymouth. These include a County farm, the Registry of Deeds, two jails (the Massachusetts Correctional Institution – Plymouth and the Plymouth County Correctional Facility) and the County Courthouse.

== Economy ==
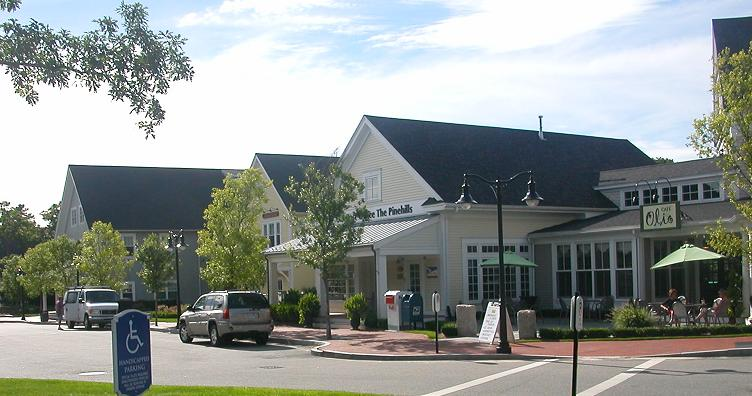
The Pinehills residential development

Plymouth's major industry is tourism, with healthcare, technical and scientific research, real estate, and telecommunications also being primary industries. The largest employer in the town is Beth Israel Deaconess Medical Center.

Plymouth has experienced commercial and industrial success, with the downtown area and North Plymouth each becoming commercial centers and an industrial park opening outside of the town center. Colony Place was completed in late 2007, located near the industrial park. It consists of several large retail stores and various chain restaurants, and it contains one of the largest designer outlet malls on the South Shore. Plymouth has also recently seen the development of several residential projects, among them The Pinehills, which consists of 1,000 residential units, two golf courses, a country club, an inn and spa hotel, and a shopping village, completed in 2010. It is expected to contain 2,877 homes.

== Education ==
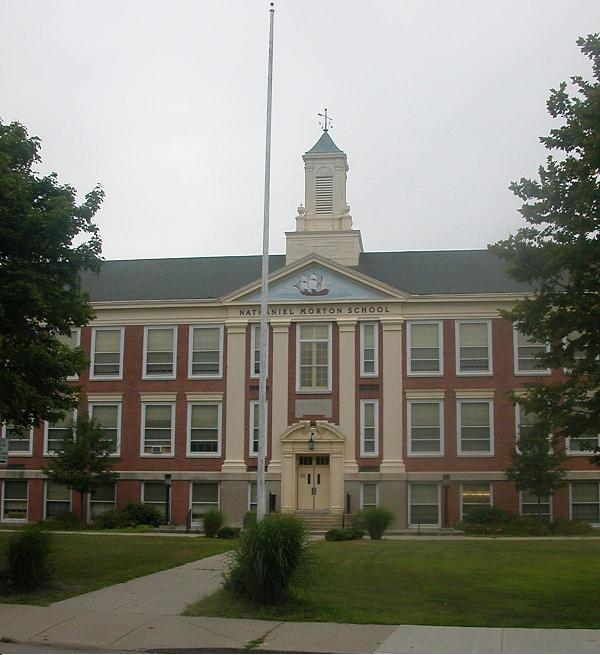
The Nathaniel Morton Elementary School in Plymouth Center

Plymouth operates a large school system, with an enrollment of over 8,000 students. The Plymouth School District is one of the largest in the state, operating fourteen schools. This is larger than the Massachusetts average of eight schools. The school district operates 86 school buses under contract with First Student bus company.

The schools in Plymouth include the Mount Pleasant Preschool, eight elementary schools (Cold Spring, Federal Furnace, Hedge, Indian Brook, Manomet, Nathanial Morton, South and West Elementaries) which generally serve students from kindergarten to fifth grade, two middle schools that serve grades 5–8, Plymouth Community Intermediate School (PCIS) and Plymouth South Middle School, and two high schools, Plymouth North and Plymouth South. Both high schools play in the Atlantic Coast League, and the two schools share a rivalry with each other. Students who decide to receive a technical education have the option of attending either Plymouth South Technical School or Plymouth North which now offers Technical studies in either Engineering or Facilities management. There were also 120 home educated children in Plymouth as of 2011.

There is also a charter school in the town, Rising Tide Charter Public School, which serves middle and high school-aged students. Two special education schools, the Baird School and the Radius Pediatric School, are located in the town.

The town has two institutions of higher learning. Quincy College has a campus located in Cordage Park. The Plymouth campus opened in 1991, and the college's main campus is in Quincy. Curry College has a campus at the northern edge of Plymouth Center in the Citizens Bank building. The campus opened in 1994, and the main campus is located in Milton. While the University of Massachusetts Boston does not have a campus in Plymouth, it offers some courses at another location in Cordage Park.

== Healthcare ==
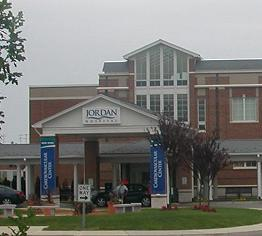
Plymouth's Beth Israel Deaconess – Plymouth Hospital (Jordan Hospital)

Plymouth is home to Beth Israel Deaconess Hospital – Plymouth (formerly Jordan Hospital), the largest hospital in the southern region of the South Shore. It is the only major healthcare provider in the town. The hospital is a community medical center serving twelve towns in Plymouth and Barnstable counties. It consists of more than 30 departments, with 150 patient beds. The hospital also offers a rehabilitation center in The Pinehills region.

While Beth Israel Deaconess – Plymouth Hospital (Jordan Hospital) is the only hospital in Plymouth. South Shore Hospital operates several offices and physician labs in South Pond. South Shore Hospital, in South Weymouth, is the largest hospital in southeastern Massachusetts.

== Transportation ==
=== Highways ===
Plymouth lies along the "Pilgrims Highway" portion of Route 3, which is the major route between Cape Cod and Boston. The town can be accessed from six exits on the highway, which is more than any other municipality along the Pilgrims Highway. Plymouth is also the eastern terminus of U.S. Route 44. The route has changed recently, as a new divided highway section has linked it to Route 3, before heading south and exiting at its old location before terminating at Route 3A, which more closely follows the shoreline and passes through Plymouth Center. Route 80's western terminus is at its intersection with old Route 44. Route 25 goes through a remote section of the town north of Buzzards Bay, but does not have an exit. Finally, the short Plimoth Patuxet Highway allows easy access between Routes 3 and 3A, with an exit that allows direct entry to Plimoth Patuxet's parking area. The highway is north of Manomet and south of Plymouth Center.

=== Rail ===
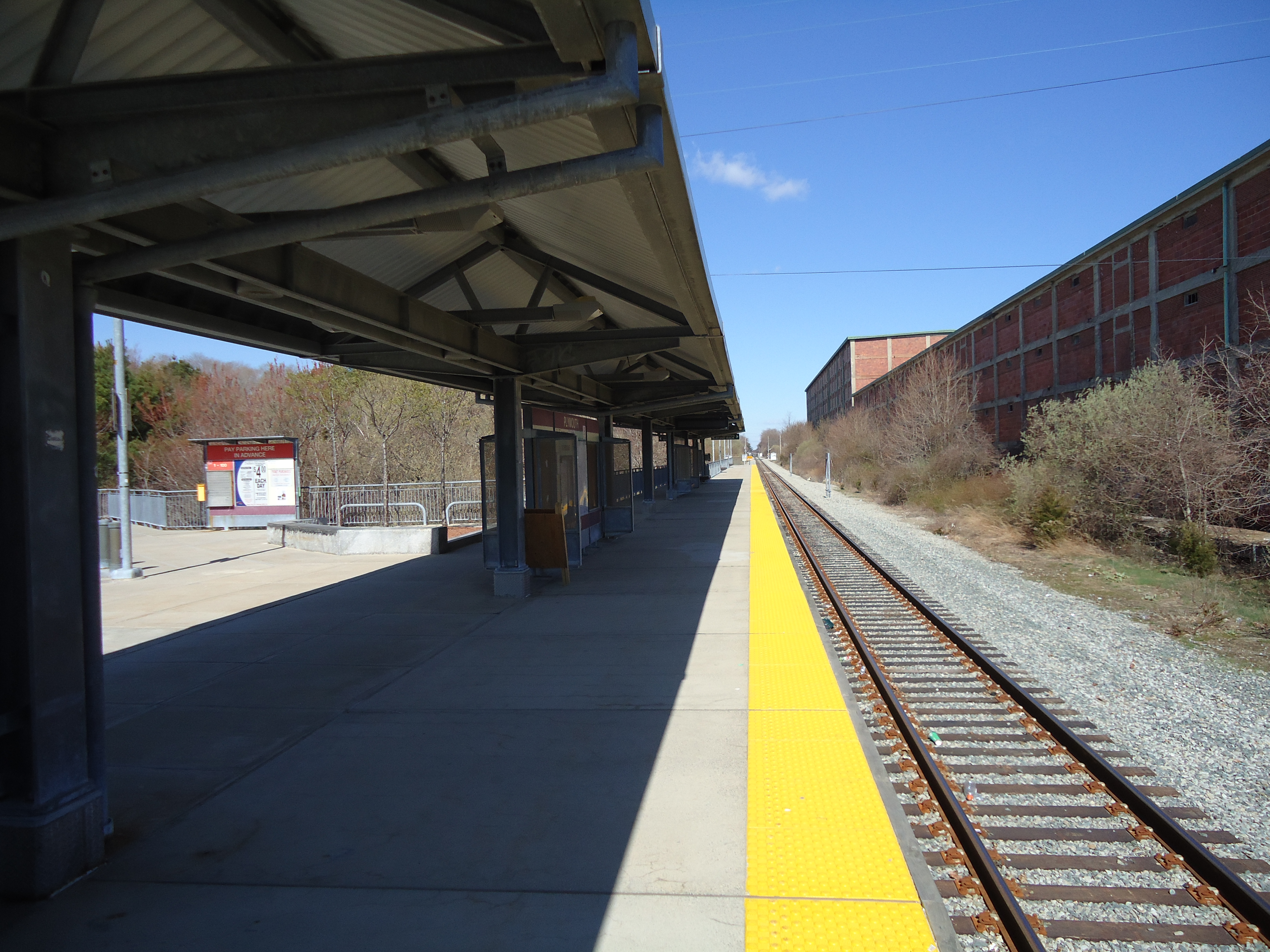
The former Plymouth station

Plymouth station, located in Cordage Park, was one of two outer termini of the Plymouth/Kingston Line of the MBTA Commuter Rail system. It was indefinitely closed in 2021, leaving Kingston station as the terminus.

=== Ferry ===
There is a seasonal ferry to Provincetown and several other excursion lines that offer cruises of Plymouth Bay and Cape Cod Bay. The ferry is operated by Capt. John Boats and offers one round trip daily from June to September. The ferry leaves from the State Wharf in Plymouth Center. In addition to the ferry, Plymouth Harbor offers service for harbor excursions, whale watching tours, and deep sea fishing. One of these excursion boats is the paddle-wheeler Pilgrim Belle.

=== Bus ===
The Plymouth & Brockton Bus Company (formerly known as the Plymouth & Brockton Street Railway; commonly abbreviated as P&B) offers daily scheduled intercity coach bus service from Plymouth to Boston's Logan International Airport, South Station in Downtown Boston and the Hyannis Transportation Center on Cape Cod with several intermediate stops along the way. P&B buses can be conveniently boarded in the Park-and-Ride Lot at Exit 13 off of Massachusetts State Route 3 adjacent to the Information Center behind the McDonald's rest stop. The Greater Attleboro Taunton Regional Transit Authority (GATRA) provides local public transportation service on four separate bus routes within the Plymouth Area Link (PAL) service district. The Mayflower Link Route serves various points within the town and offers a direct connection with P&B bus service at the same Exit 13 Park-and-Ride facility. The Freedom Link and the Liberty Link both originate from Plymouth Center and serves several shopping destinations in Plymouth and neighboring Kingston. A deviated route is provided by GATRA along the town's coastal shoreline between the neighborhoods of Manomet and Cedarville in the southeastern section of Plymouth.

=== Air ===
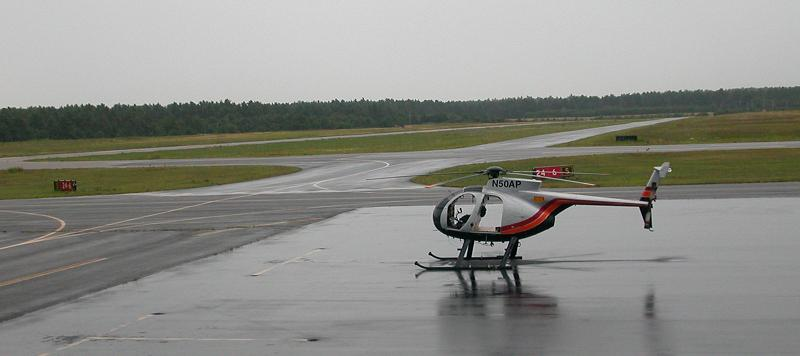
The Plymouth Municipal Airport

The town is home to the Plymouth Municipal Airport, which lies on the border between Plymouth and Carver. Founded in 1931, it offers scheduled service to Nantucket, as well as private service. The airport features a local restaurant and gift shop, but does not have an on-site traffic control tower.

Barnstable Municipal Airport, in Hyannis, offers additional scheduled carrier service. The airport offers scheduled flight services to Nantucket, Martha's Vineyard, Boston and New York City. It is approximately 30 mi (48 km) from Plymouth.

The nearest national and international airport is Logan International Airport in Boston, roughly 43 mi (69 km) away. Rhode Island T. F. Green International Airport, a state airport located in Warwick, Rhode Island, is about 63 mi (101 km) away.

== Sports ==
Plymouth was the home of the New England Collegiate Baseball League's Plymouth Pilgrims, who played their home games at Forbes Field.

== Points of interest ==
Promoted as America's Hometown, Plymouth is a tourist destination noted for its heritage. The town is home to several notable sites.

=== Plymouth Rock ===
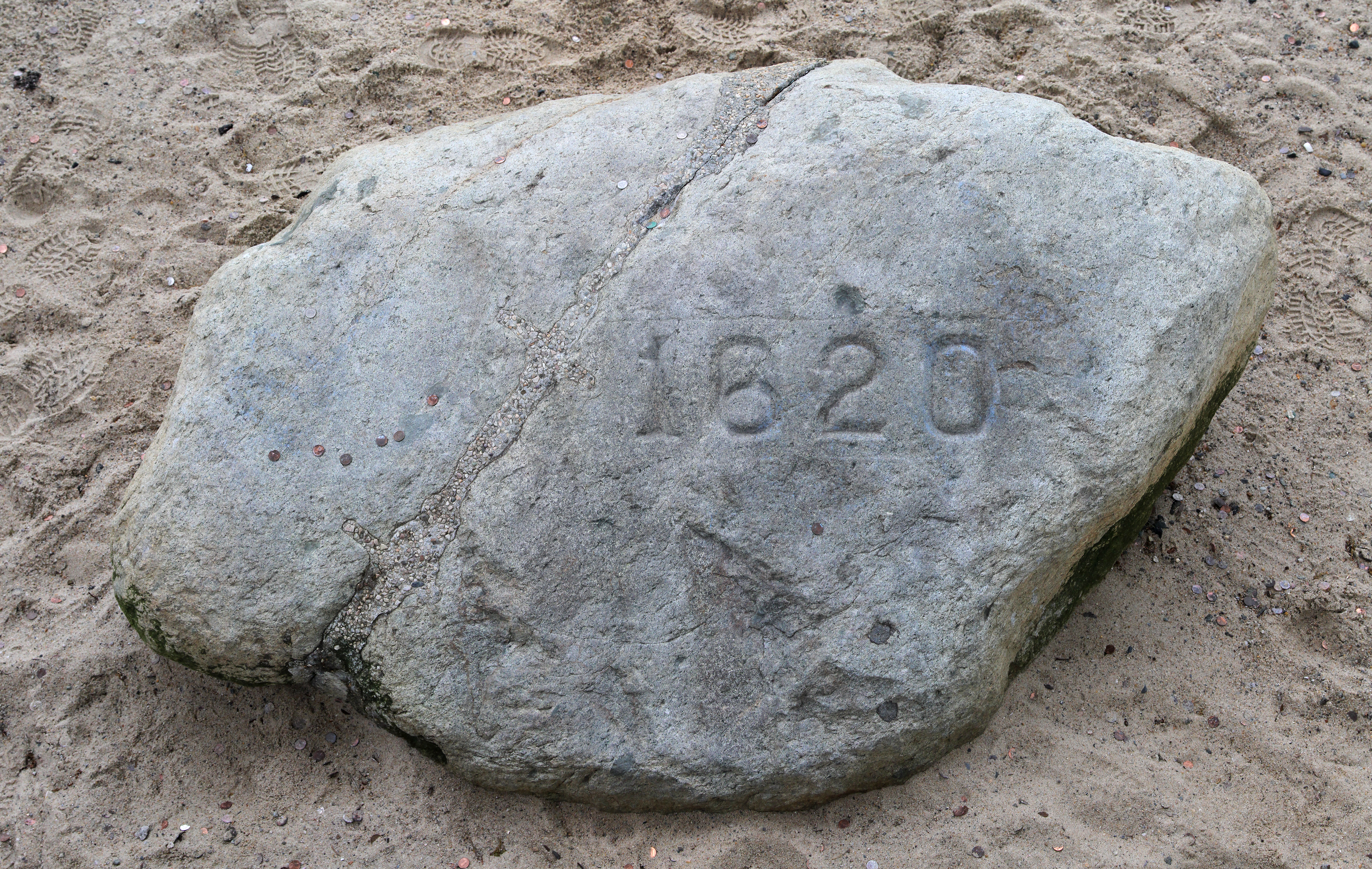
Plymouth Rock, inscribed with 1620, the year of the Pilgrims' landing in the Mayflower

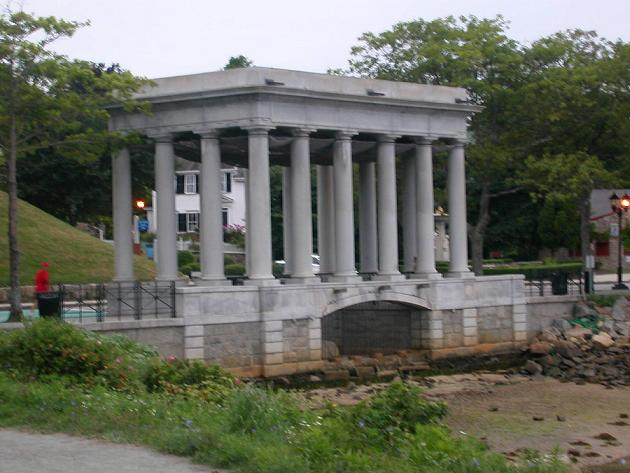
The Plymouth Rock Monument

Plymouth Rock is one of Plymouth's most famous attractions. Traditionally, the rock is said to be the disembarkation site of the Pilgrims. The first identification of Plymouth Rock as the actual landing site was made in 1741 by 94-year-old Thomas Faunce, whose father had arrived in Plymouth in 1623, three years after the arrival of the Mayflower. The rock is located roughly 650 feet (200 m) from where the initial settlement was thought to be built.

Plymouth Rock became very famous after its identification as the supposed landing site of the Pilgrims, and was subsequently moved to a location in Plymouth Center. During the process, the rock split in two. It was later moved to Pilgrim Hall and then to a location under a granite Victorian canopy, where it was easily accessible and subject to souvenir hunters. The rock was finally moved back to its original location along the town's waterfront in 1921.

Plymouth Rock, a large boulder, now sits under the historic Plymouth Rock Portico. The Neo-Classical Revival structure was designed by the highly influential architectural firm of McKim, Mead and White, designers of the Boston Public Library, Rhode Island State House and the former Pennsylvania Station in New York City. Built in 1921. the existing granite portico replaced an earlier Gothic Revival style monument designed by Hammatt Billings (who also designed the National Monument to the Forefathers).

In 1970 the Plymouth Rock Portico was listed in the National Register of Historic Places. The rock and portico are the centerpiece of Pilgrim Memorial State Park. The park is the smallest park in the Massachusetts state forest and park system, but is also the most heavily visited.

=== Plimoth Patuxet ===
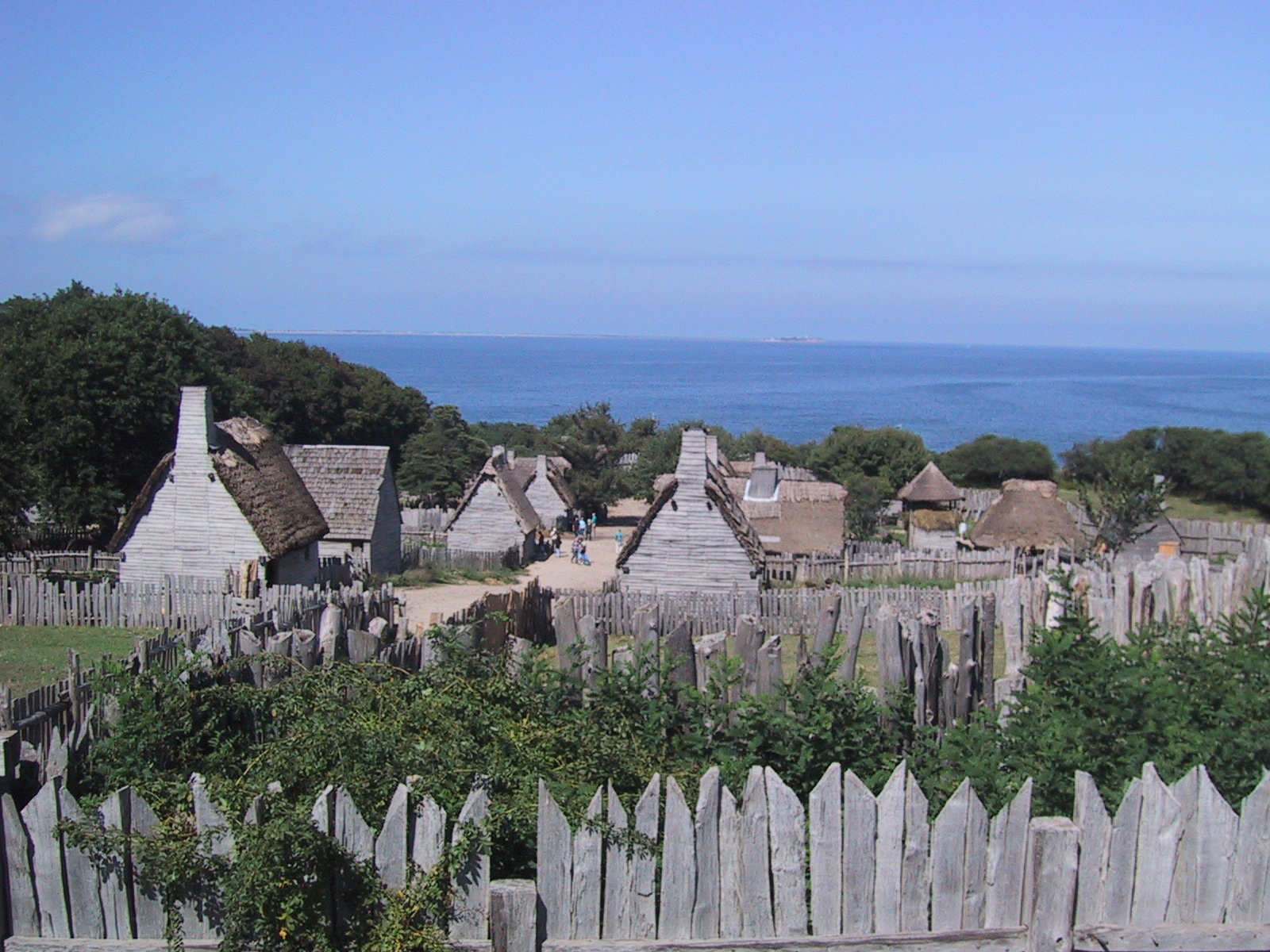
Plimoth Patuxet

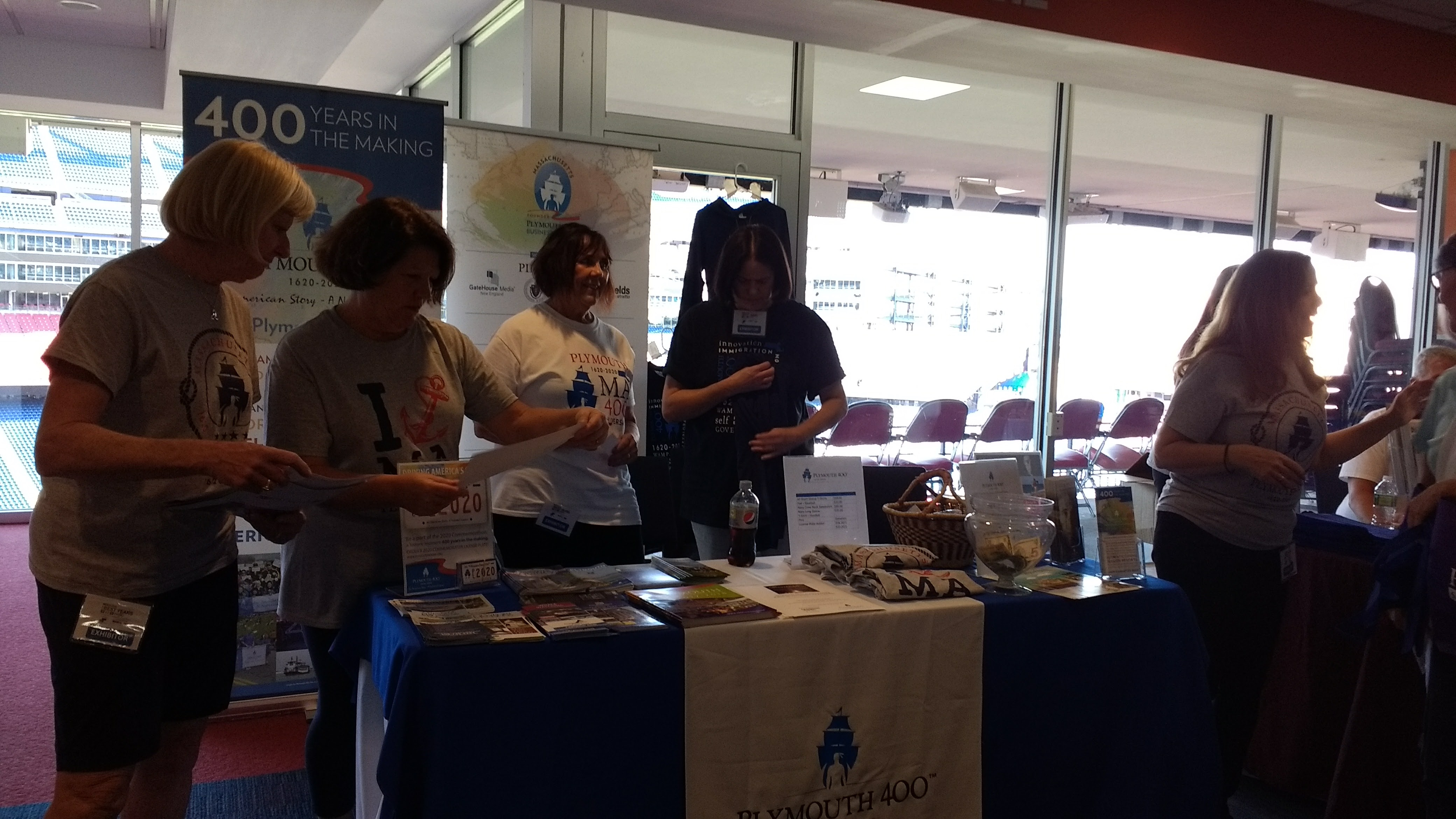
A booth for Plymouth 400, a group planning events for the 400th anniversary of the Mayflower voyage and the founding of Plymouth Colony.

Plimoth Patuxet is a living history museum located south of Plymouth Center. It consists of a re-creation of the Plymouth settlement in 1627, as well as a replica of a 17th-century Wampanoag homesite. The museum features role playing tour guides, as well as a large crafts center. The Nye Barn, a replica of a 1627 farming homestead in Plymouth, is also part of the museum. The farm features several animals that would have been found in Plymouth Colony, but are very rare in modern times.

The museum opened in 1947 as Plimoth Plantation under the guidance of Henry Hornblower II, a wealthy Boston stockbroker who grew up in Plymouth. The museum originally consisted of the Mayflower II and a "First House" exhibit in Plymouth Center, but was expanded into a large fortified town and a Native American village by 1960.

=== Mayflower II ===
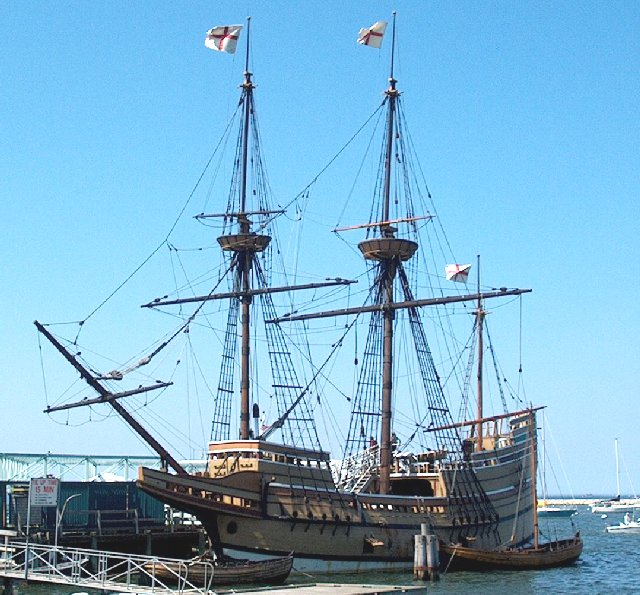
The Mayflower II, located in Plymouth Harbor, is considered to be a faithful replica of the original Mayflower.

The Mayflower II is a full-size replica of the Mayflower, the ship which brought the Pilgrims to Plymouth in 1620. It is located at the State Pier in Plymouth Center. The ship is open as a museum about the Pilgrims' historic voyage from Plymouth, England, and is considered a faithful replica of the original Mayflower. It is officially a part of Plimoth Patuxet.

The ship was built in Brixham, England in 1956, and sailed to Plymouth across the Atlantic Ocean in 1957 by famous mariner Alan Villiers. The ship is still seaworthy, and routinely takes voyages around Plymouth Harbor. In the year 2007, the Mayflower II celebrated the 50th anniversary of its arrival in Plymouth.

=== Other sites ===
==== Historic interest ====
In addition to the Plymouth Rock Memorial, several other monuments were constructed in celebration of Plymouth's tricentennial. These include statues of Massasoit and William Bradford, and a sarcophagus containing the bones of the 51 Pilgrims who died in the winter of 1620, which rests atop Cole's Hill.

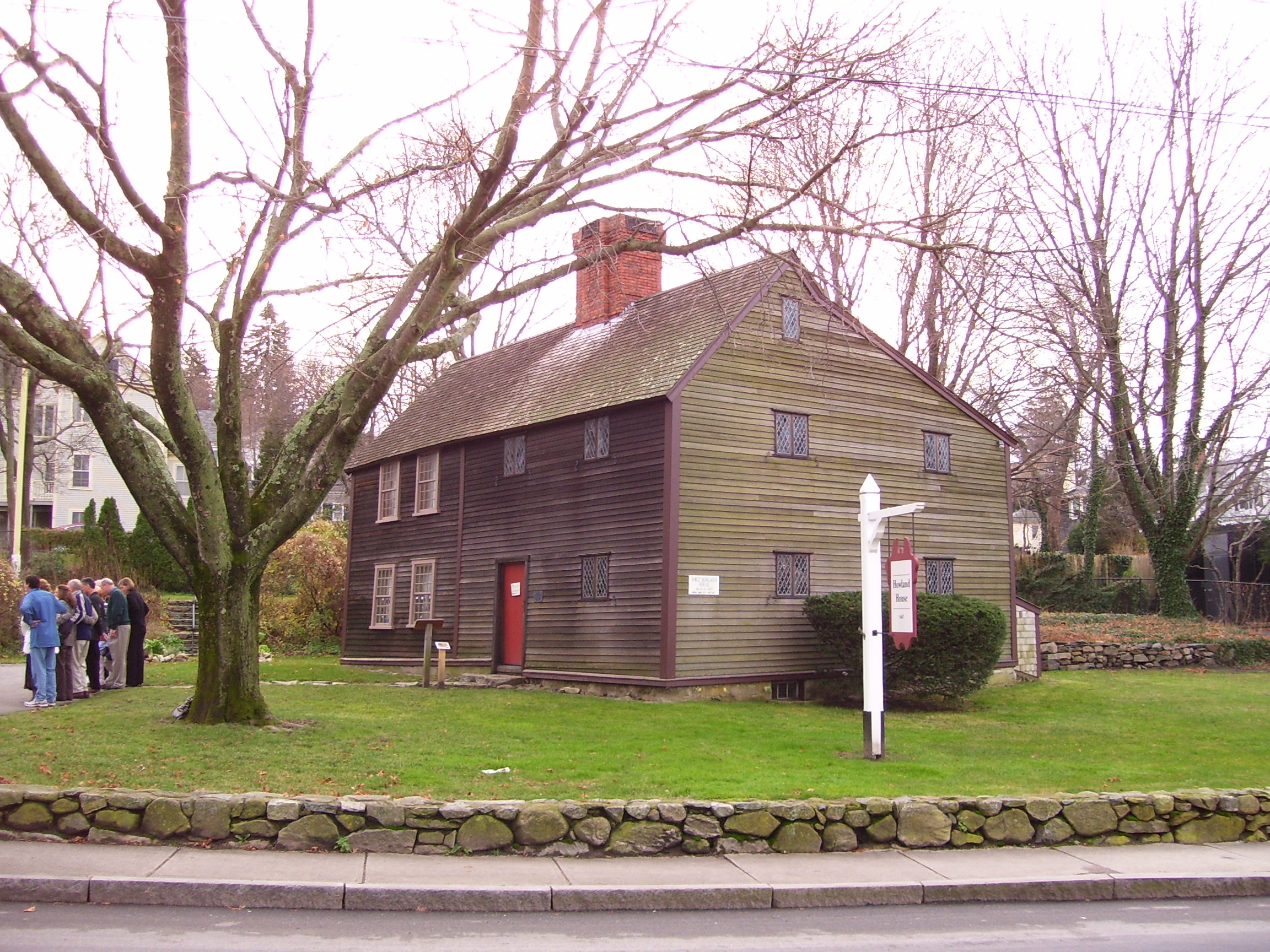
The Jabez Howland House is open to the public as a museum.

Pilgrim Hall Museum, founded in 1824, is the oldest continually operating museum in the United States. It is located in Plymouth Center. The Jabez Howland House is the only house in which one of the Pilgrims lived that still stands. Plymouth also features the National Monument to the Forefathers, which was dedicated in 1889. Standing at 81 feet (25 m) tall, it is the tallest free-standing solid granite monument in the United States. Other notable historical sites include the Plimoth Grist Mill, a working replica of an original mill built in 1636 (also officially a part of Plimoth Patuxet), as well as the 1640 Richard Sparrow House, the oldest house still standing in Plymouth. At the edge of the town on Route 80 is Parting Ways, a 94-acre (380,000 m^{2}) site that is notable for containing the remains of four former slaves who fought in the American Revolutionary War and their families. Other historic houses include the Mayflower House Museum.

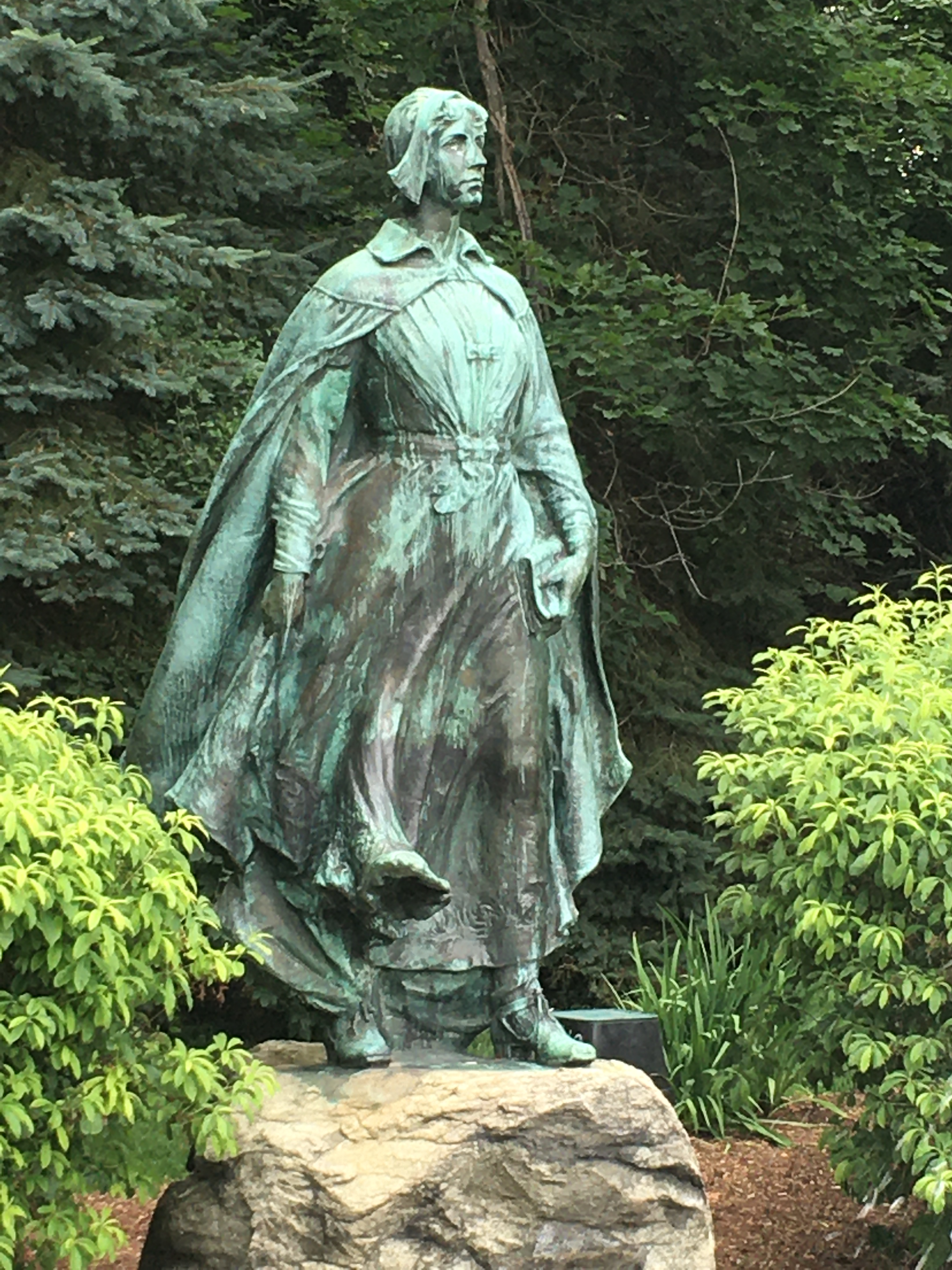
"The Pilgrim Maiden" statue in Brewster Gardens, Plymouth, MA

There are 21 locations in Plymouth that appear on the National Register of Historic Places, including Plymouth Rock, Cole's Hill, Parting Ways, and Pilgrim Hall.

==== Parks and recreation ====
Myles Standish State Forest, the Commonwealth's second largest state forest, is located in Plymouth. It is a camping and hiking destination, and contains 16 freshwater lakes and ponds. It is home to Pinewoods Dance Camp, a traditional dance and music camp listed on the National Register of Historic Places. Ellisville Harbor State Park, located in the extreme southern portion of the town, contains a natural beach inside Cape Cod Bay. Plymouth is also home to 11 public and private golf courses, which include Squirrel Run, Pinehills, Plymouth Country Club, and Southers Marsh, a course that runs through a series of actively maintained cranberry bogs.

== Notable people ==
Name	Born	Died	Notability and relation to Plymouth
James Warren	1726	1808	president of the Massachusetts provincial legislature and prominent colonial-era politician.
Elkanah Watson	1758	1842	American Revolution patriot, associate of John Brown, Travel literature writer
Aaron Matson	1770	1855	a United States Representative from New Hampshire, born in Plymouth
Thomas Davee	1797	1841	United States Representative from Maine, born in Plymouth
Oliver Ames Jr.	1807	1877	railroad official, former resident of Plymouth
John Bartlett	1820	1905	publisher of Bartlett's Familiar Quotations, born in Plymouth
Frederic Augustus Lucas	1852	1929	Brooklyn Institute of Arts and Sciences museum director, author of many scientific papers, born in Plymouth
Grace Langford	1871	1957	Physics professor at Wellesley College and Barnard College
Violet Mersereau	1892	1975	silent film actress, died in Plymouth
Beatrice Roberts	1905	1970	film actress
Glen Gray	1906	1963	saxophonist, leader of the Casa Loma Orchestra, born in Roanoke Illinois, died in Plymouth
Henry Picard	1906	1997	Professional golfer, won The Masters Tournament
Pee Wee Hunt	1907	1979	trombonist and co-founder of the Casa Loma Orchestra, died in Plymouth
Kitty Wintringham	1908	1966	British political activist, born in Plymouth
Ken Coleman	1925	2003	sportscaster, died in Plymouth
Dick Gregory	1932	2017	comedian, activist and nutritionist, resident of Plymouth
Dick Waterman	1935	2024	blues promoter and photographer, born in Plymouth
Peter J. Gomes	1942	2011	preacher and theologian at Harvard Divinity School, resident of Plymouth
Nancy Darsch	1951	2020	WNBA Coach, native of Plymouth
Brooke de Lench	1952		Author, entrepreneur, advocate for athlete safety and welfare, born in Plymouth
Warren G. Phillips	1954		Inducted into the National Teachers Hall of Fame in 2010, taught in Plymouth
Michael Sweet	1963		Lead vocalist and lead and rhythm guitars in Stryper. Resident of Plymouth.
Chris Alberghini	1965		television producer-writer, born in Plymouth
Mike Remlinger	1966		major league baseball pitcher, grew up in Plymouth
Amy Lynn Baxter	1967		adult film star and nude model, born in Plymouth
Gary DiSarcina	1967		former shortstop for the California Angels and manager of the single-A team Lowell Spinners, currently resides in Plymouth.
David Chokachi	1968		actor, born in Plymouth. Most known for roles in Baywatch, Witchblade, and Beyond the Break.
Keith Sanderson	1975		sport shooter.
Jamie P. Chandler	1977		political commentator and author, born in Plymouth
Dave Farrell	1977		bassist with Linkin Park, born in Plymouth
Chris Raab	1980		Television personality, member of the CKY crew (Viva La Bam and Jackass).
Matthew Cappucci	1997		Meteorologist, reporter, storm chaser, and author

== Twin and sister cities ==
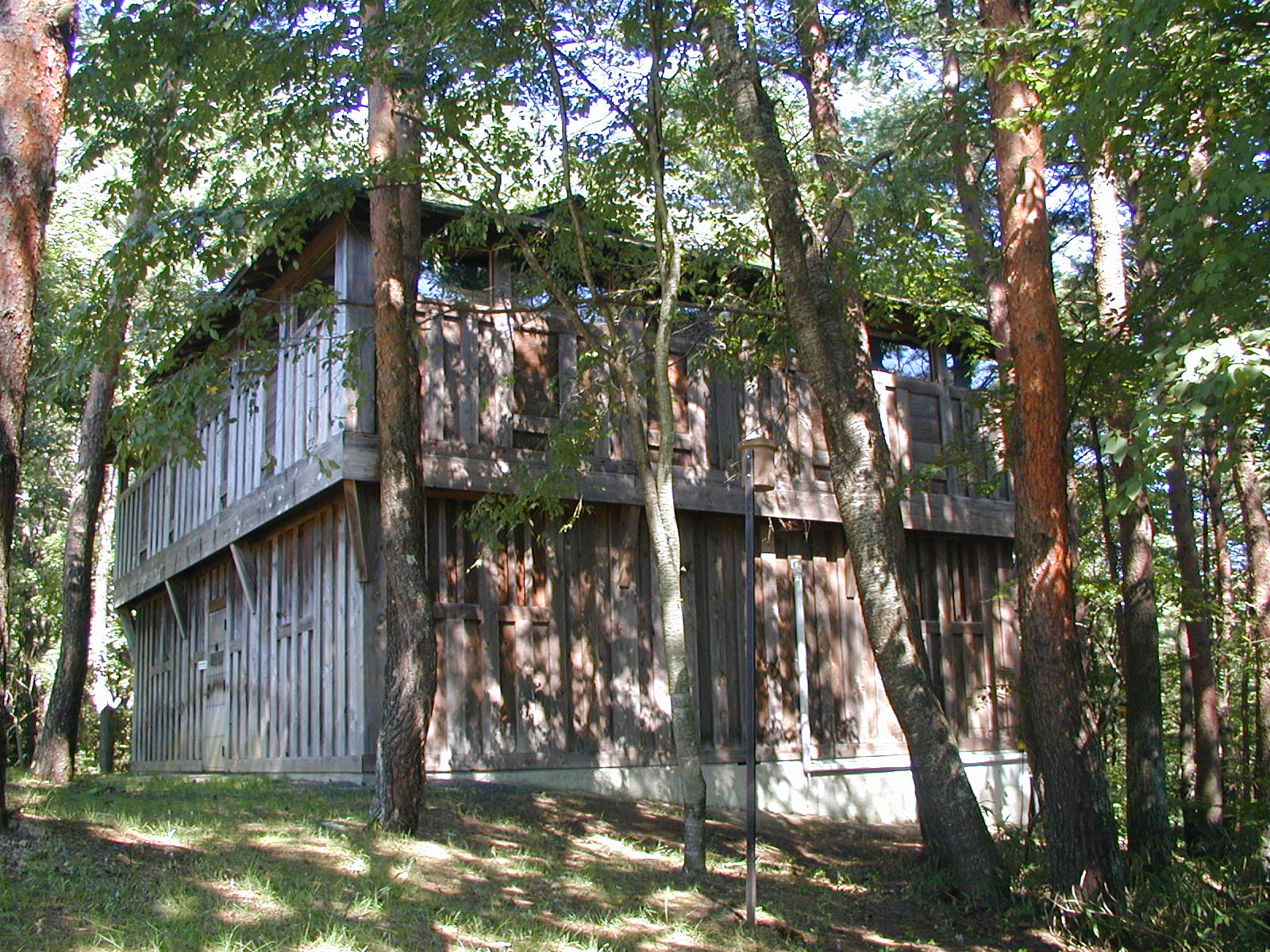
Plymouth House in Shichigahama, modeling after the recreated First Parish Church in Plimoth Patuxet

Since 2001, Plymouth has shared a twin-city status with: Plymouth, Devon, United Kingdom. In addition, since 1990, Plymouth has shared a sister-city status with Shichigahama, Miyagi Prefecture, Japan.
