= Grace Langford =

American physicist (1871–1957)

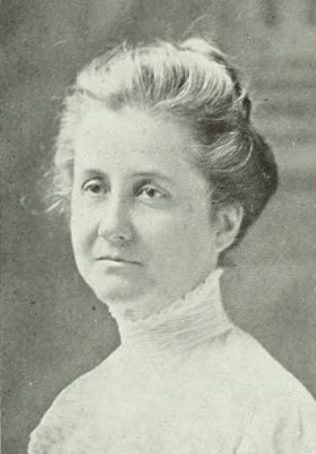
- Grace Langford, from the 1914 yearbook of Barnard College
- Born: June 27, 1871; Plymouth, Massachusetts
- Died: December 4, 1957 (aged 86); Plymouth, Massachusetts

Academic background
- Education: Massachusetts Institute of Technology

Academic work
- Discipline: Physics
- Sub-discipline: Physics education
- Institutions: Barnard College; Wellesley College
- Main interests: Infrared reflection of phosphates

Grace Langford (June 27, 1871 – December 4, 1957) was an American physicist known for her work in physics education and research on the infrared reflection of phosphates. She taught at Wellesley College and at Barnard College.

== Early life and education ==
Langford was born in Plymouth, Massachusetts, the seventh and youngest child of John Langford and Celestina Eldridge Langford. She graduated from Plymouth High School in 1889. She attended Wellesley College, where she was an instructor and undergraduate student simultaneously, and the Massachusetts Institute of Technology, where she earned her B.S. in physics in 1900, as the only woman in her graduating class. Her senior thesis was titled "An Investigation of the Effect of Dilution on the Color of Copper Solution and its Relation to the Dissociation Theory."

== Career ==
From 1894 to 1905, Langford taught physics at Wellesley. In 1905, she began research at Barnard College, where she also taught. She briefly returned to Wellesley to teach in 1908, then remained at Barnard for several years. She published her research in Physical Review. She also reported on the activities of the Faculty Science Club of Wellesley College in the journal Science.

== Selected publications ==
- "The Selective Reflection of Ortho-, Meta- and Pyro-Phosphates in the Infra-Red Spectrum" (1911)

== Personal life ==
Langford died in Plymouth, Massachusetts in 1957, aged 86 years.
