= Plymouth Municipal Airport (Massachusetts) =

Airport in Massachusetts, United States

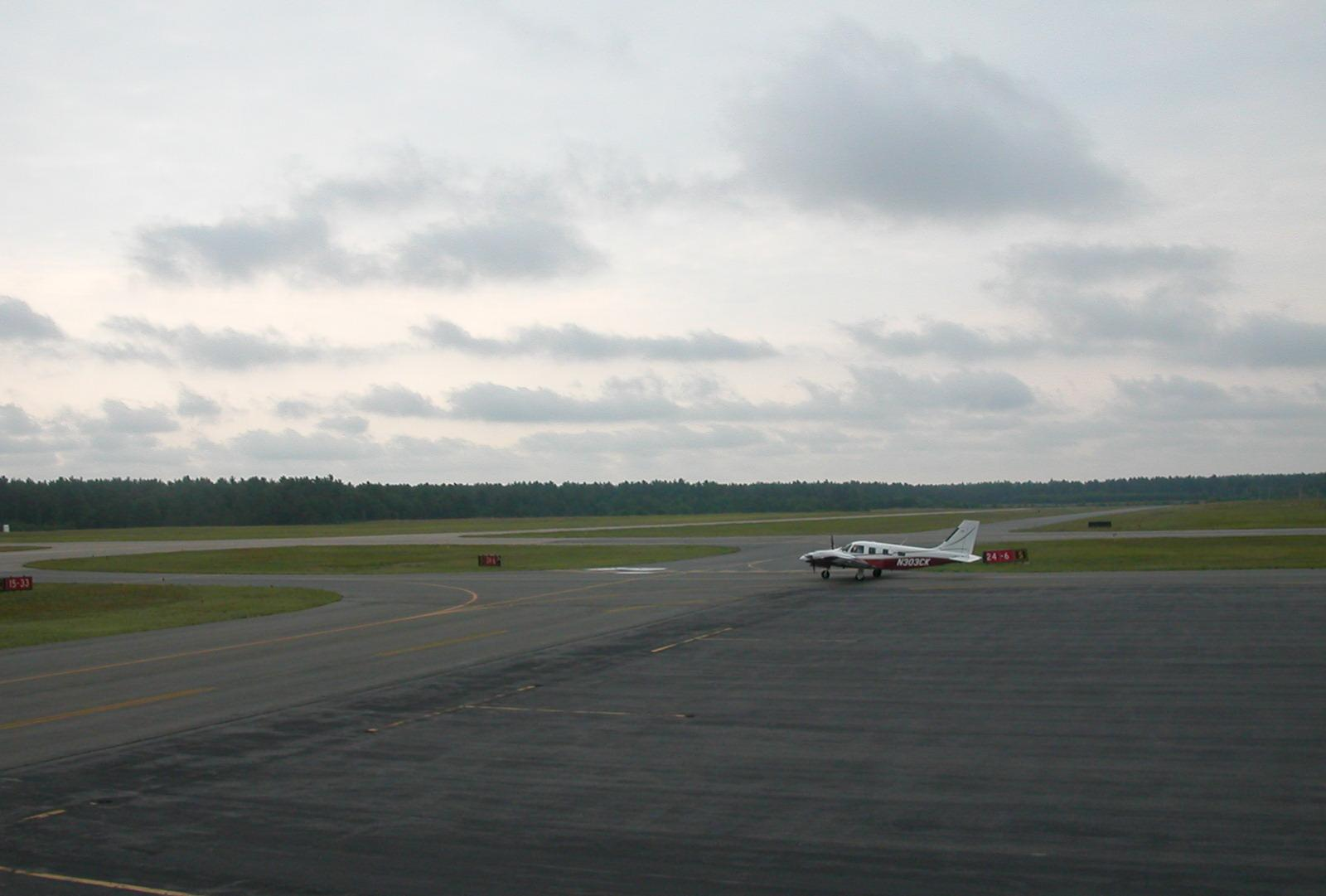
- A private plane on the airport's main ramp
- IATA: PYM; ICAO: KPYM; FAA LID: PYM

Summary
- Airport type: Public
- Owner: Town of Plymouth
- Serves: Plymouth County, Massachusetts
- Elevation AMSL: 148 ft (45 m)
- Coordinates: 41°54′32″N 070°43′44″W
- Website: pymairport.com

Map
- Interactive map of Plymouth Municipal Airport

Statistics (2009)
- Aircraft operations: 73,040
- Based aircraft: 134
- Source: Federal Aviation Administration

Plymouth Municipal Airport (IATA: PYM, ICAO: KPYM, FAA LID: PYM) is a town-owned, public-use airport located four nautical miles (7 km) southwest of the central business district of Plymouth, a town in Plymouth County, Massachusetts, United States. According to the FAA's National Plan of Integrated Airport Systems for 2009–2013, it is categorized as a general aviation airport. Due to space issues, the airport has two gates in Carver, Massachusetts.

The field was originally Naval Outlying Landing Field Plymouth, a Naval Outlying Landing Field located in Plymouth, operational from 1942 to 1945. It existed as an outlying field of Naval Air Station Squantum (as well as nearby Naval Air Station Quonset Point in December 1944) and was used by student pilots to gain flight experience on its two 4,300-foot turf runways.

== Facilities and aircraft ==
Plymouth Municipal Airport covers an area of 758 acres (307 ha) at an elevation of 148 feet (45 m) above mean sea level.

Runway 6/24 information
Dimensions	4350 x 75 ft. / 1326 x 23 m	
Surface	Asphalt, in good condition	
Weight bearing capacity	Single wheel: 25.0	
Runway edge lights	Medium intensity	
	Runway 6	Runway 24
Latitude	41-54.254138N	41-54.806325N
Longitude	070-44.191108W	070-43.580575W
Elevation (MSL)	135.1 ft	146.8 ft
Gradient	0.4%	0.4%
Traffic pattern	Left	Left
Runway heading	056 magnetic 040 true	236 magnetic 220 true
Declared distances	TORA: 4350 TODA: 4350 ASDA: 4650 LDA: 4350	TORA: 4350 TODA: 4350 ASDA: 4350 LDA: 4350
Markings	Precision, in good condition	Non-precision, in good condition
Visual slope indicator	4-light PAPI on left (3.00 degrees glide path)	4-light PAPI on left (4.00 degrees glide path)
Approach lights	MALSF: 1,400 foot medium intensity approach lighting system with sequenced flashers	
Runway end identifier lights		Yes
Touchdown point	Yes, no lights	Yes, no lights
Instrument approach	ILS/DME, RNAV (GPS)	RNAV (GPS)
Obstructions	30 foot trees, 1700 feet from runway	65 foot trees, 1,500 feet from runway, 20:1 slope to clear

Runway 15/33 information
Dimensions	4350 x 75 ft. / 1326 x 23 m	
Surface	Asphalt, in good condition	
Weight bearing capacity	Single wheel: 60.0 Double wheel: 85.0 Double tandem: 155.0	
Runway edge lights	Medium intensity	
	Runway 15	Runway 33
Latitude	41-54.732080N	41-54.275500N
Longitude	070-43.805838W	070-43.066833W
Elevation (MSL)	144.9 ft	133.4 ft
Gradient	0.4%	0.4%
Traffic pattern	Left	Left
Runway heading	146 magnetic 130 true	326 magnetic 310 true
Declared distances	TORA: 4350 TODA: 4350 ASDA: 4350 LDA: 4350	TORA: 4350 TODA: 4350 ASDA: 4650 LDA: 4350
Markings	Basic, in good condition	Basic, in good condition
Visual slope indicator		4-light PAPI on left (3.00 degrees glide path)
Touchdown point	Yes, no lights	Yes, no lights
Obstructions	27 ft. trees, 750 ft. from runway, 125 ft. left of centerline, 20:1 slope to clear	80 ft. tree, 1800 ft. from runway, 125 ft. left of centerline, 20:1 slope to clear

Airport services
Fuel	100LL, Jet-A
Parking	Aircraft hangars and tiedowns
Airframe service	Major
Powerplant service	Major
Bottled oxygen	Low
Bulk oxygen	Low

Airport communications
CTAF/UNICOM	122.725
WX ASOS	135.625 (508) 746-8003
Clearance delivery*	127.75
Boston approach/departure*	118.2
Pilot-controlled lighting	122.900
* Note: APCH/DEP services provided by Boston Center on 128.75 when Cape approach is closed.

For the 12-month period ending July 14, 2016, the airport had an average of 139 operations per day. 59% local general aviation, 39% transient general aviation, 1% air taxi, and <1% military. At that time there were 114 aircraft based at this airport: 96 single-engine, 8 multi-engine, 6 jets and 4 helicopters.

== Gallery ==
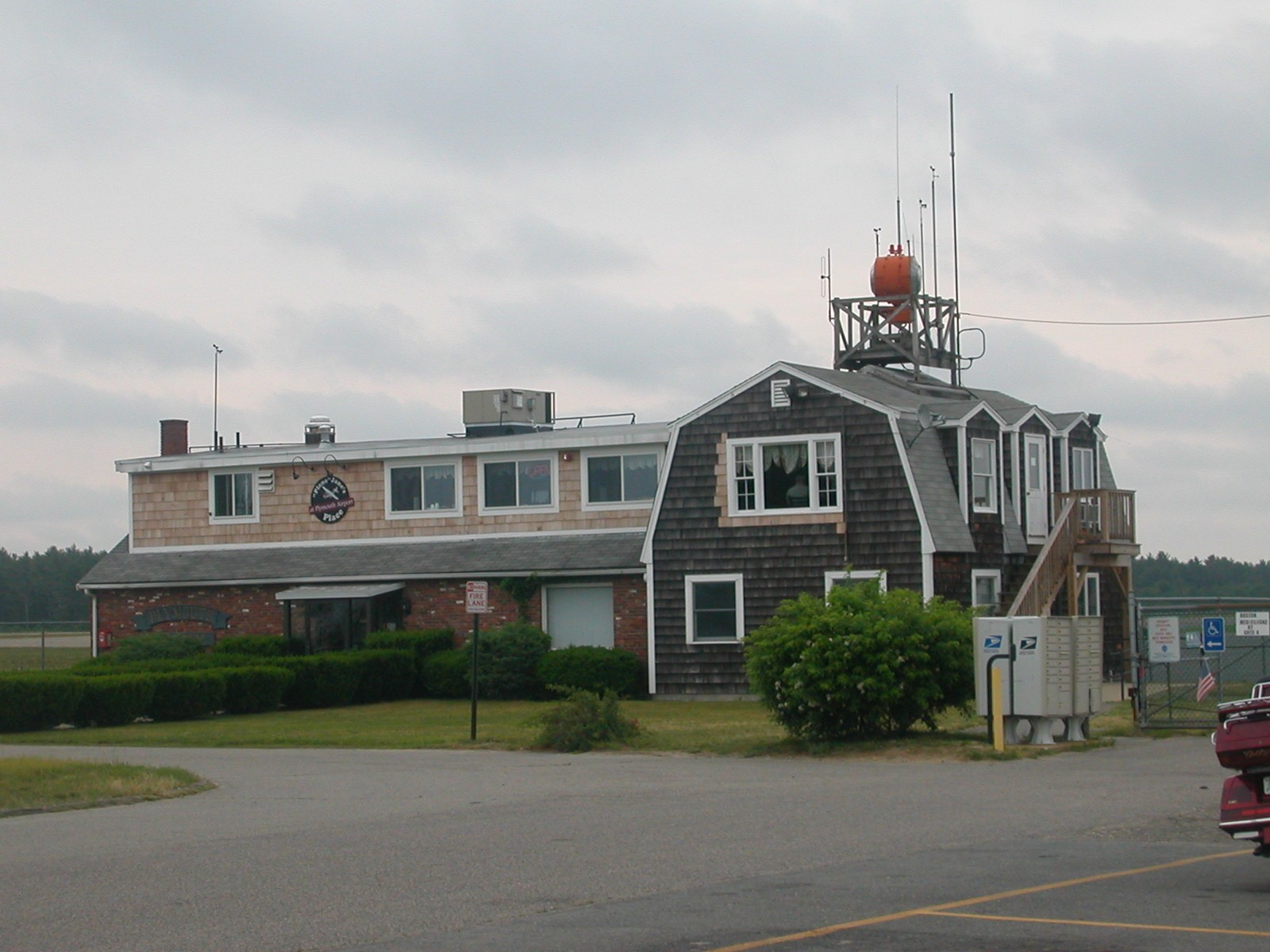
Former General aviation terminal

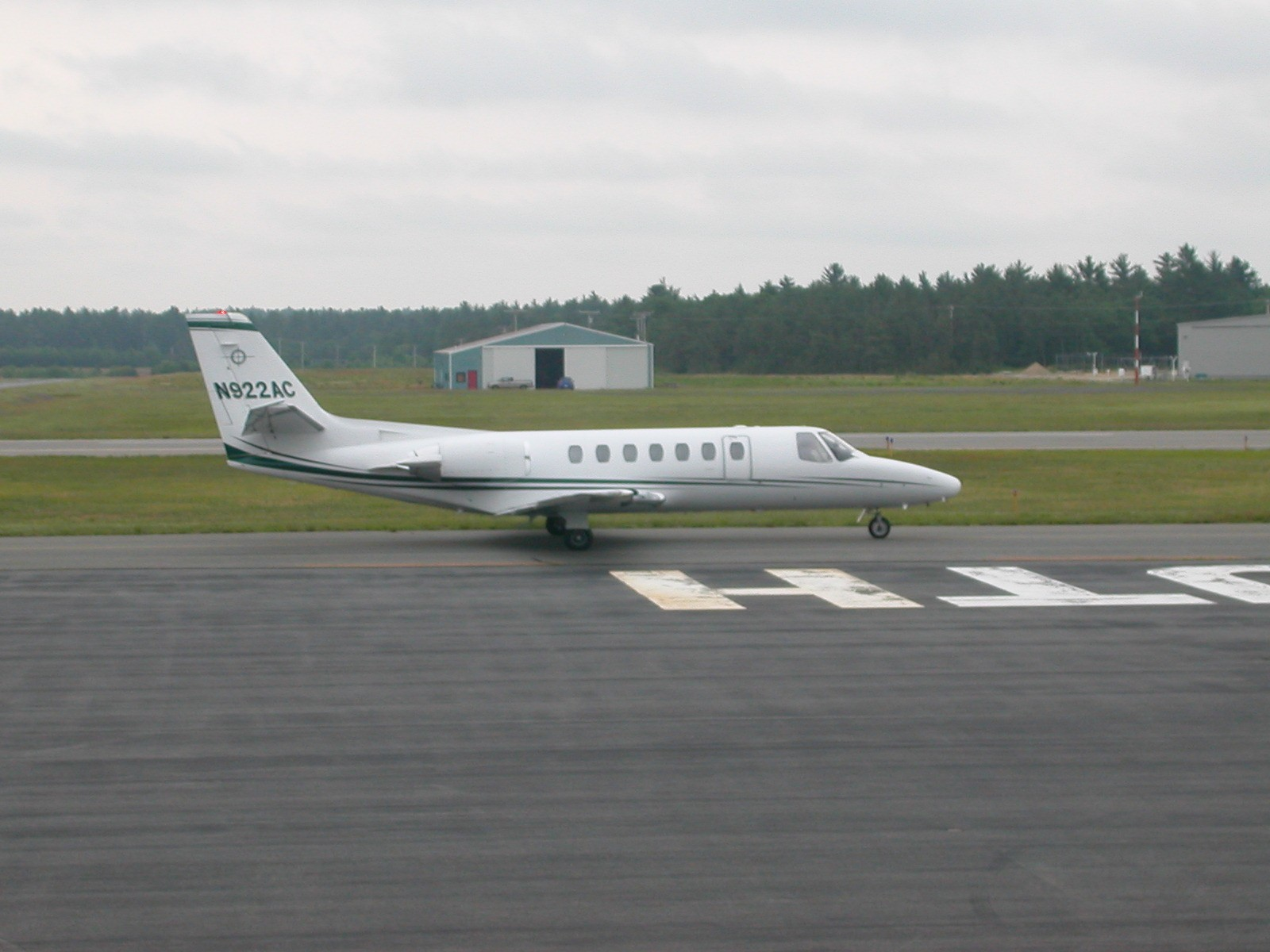
Charter plane at the airport

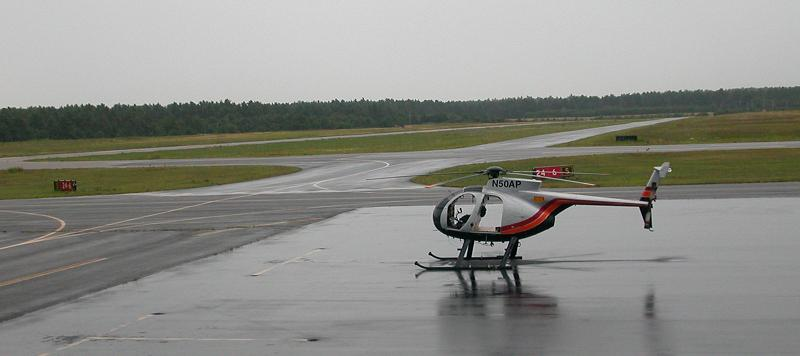
Helicopter on the airport ramp

== See also ==
- List of airports in Massachusetts
