= Locations in the United States named for a place in England =

A large number of places in the U.S were named after places in England largely as a result of English settlers and explorers of the Thirteen Colonies.

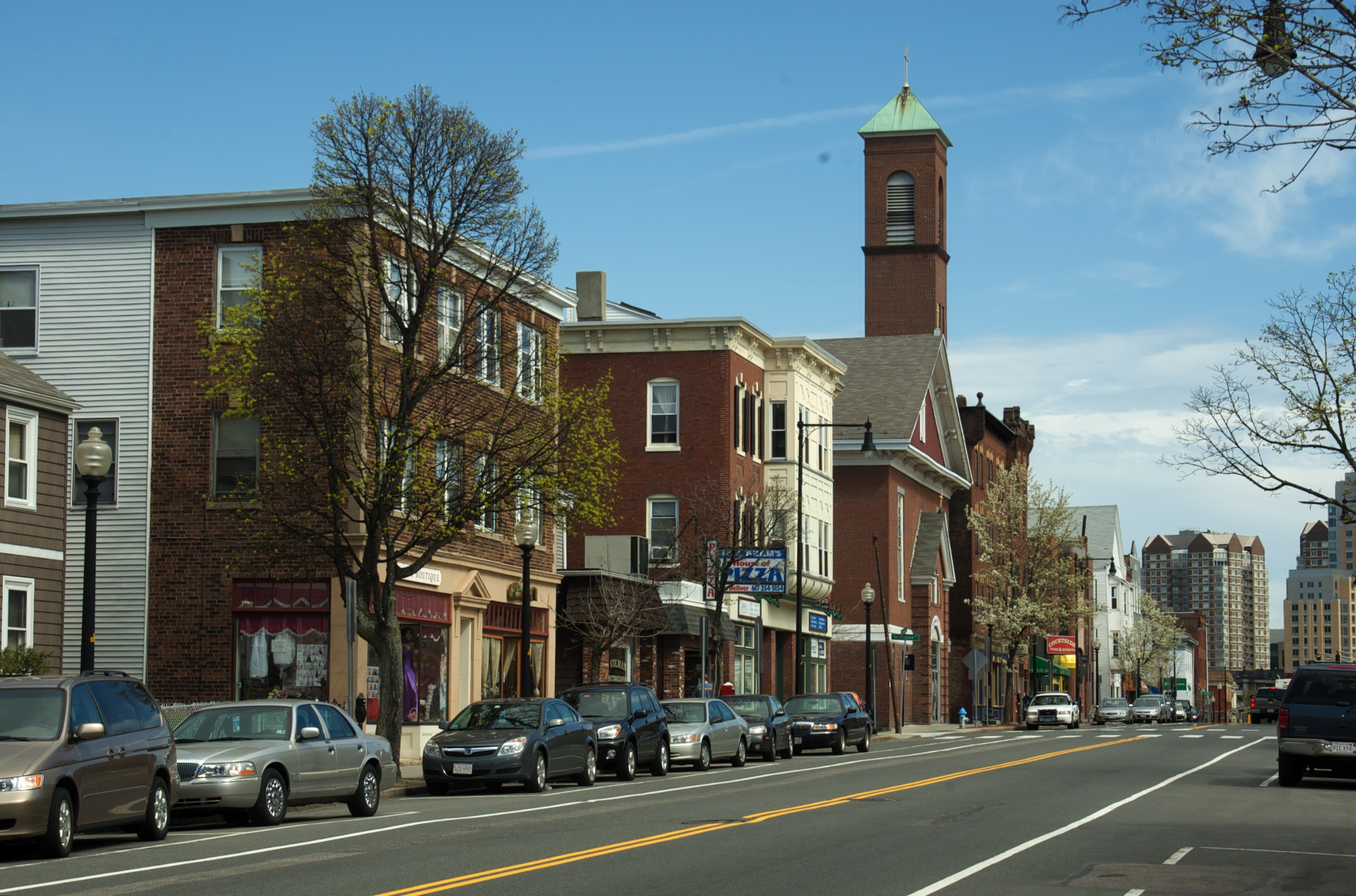
Cambridge, Massachusetts settled in 1630 is named in honor of England’s University of Cambridge.

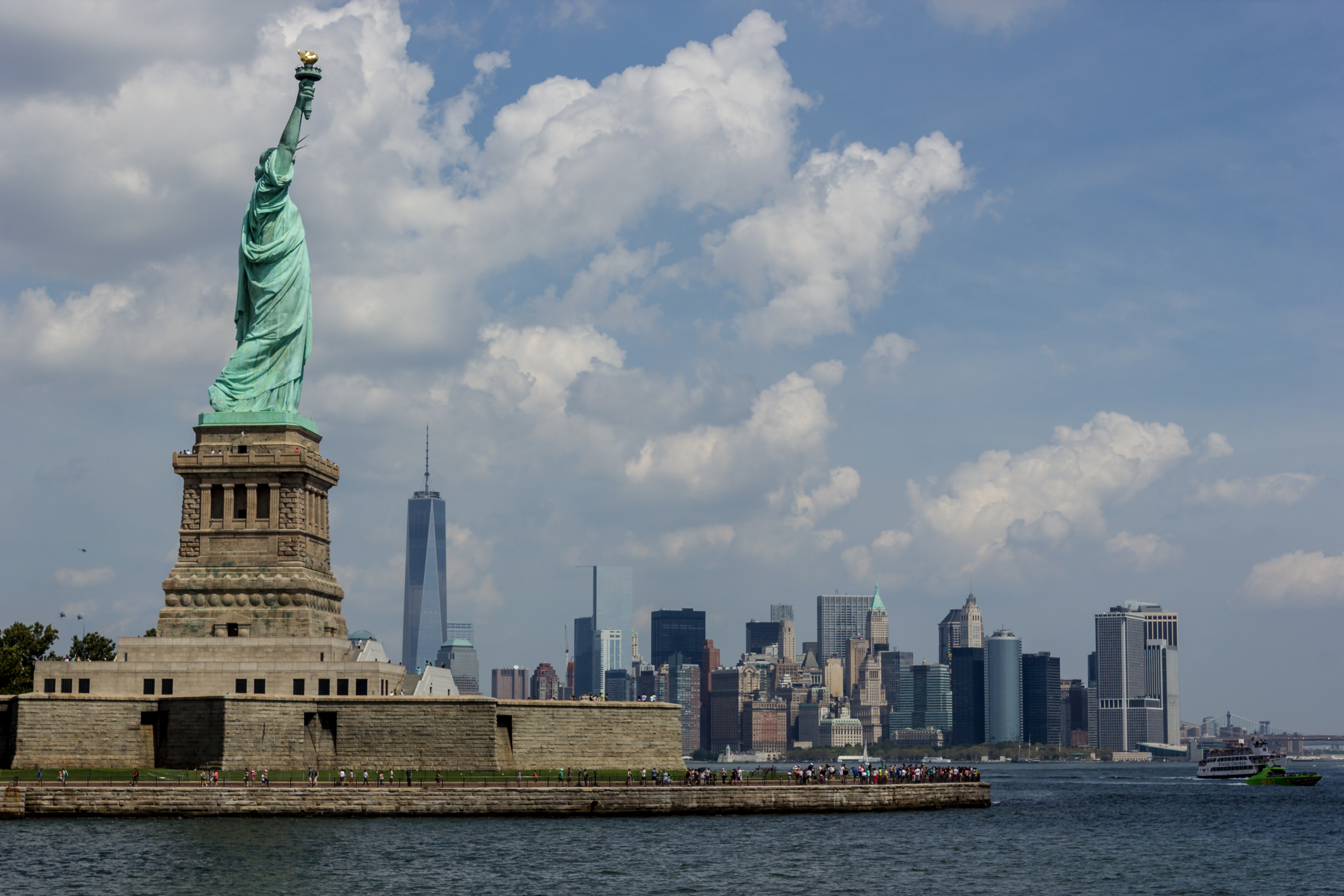
In 1664, the English renamed "New York" after the Duke of York.

Some names were carried over directly and are found throughout the country (such as Manchester, Birmingham and Rochester). Others carry the prefix "New"; for example, the largest city in the US, New York, was named after York because King Charles II gave the land to his brother, James, the Duke of York (later James II). Some places, such as Hartford, Connecticut, bear an archaic spelling of an English place (in this case Hertford).

Washington, D.C., the federal capital of the U.S., is named after the first U.S. President George Washington, whose surname was due to his family holding land in Washington, Tyne and Wear.

== Alabama ==
- Ashford
- Avon
- Birmingham
- Brent
- Brighton
- Chelsea
- Leeds
- New London
- Oxford
- Sheffield
- Woodstock
- York
- Manchester

== Alaska ==
- Sutton

== Arizona ==
- Douglas
- Winslow

== Arkansas ==
- Bradford
- Camden
- Chester
- Carlisle
- Dover
- England
- Everton
- Hampton
- Hartford
- Hatfield
- Haynes
- Lincoln (Named after Abraham Lincoln, whose last name originates from the city of Lincoln in England)
- London
- Melbourne
- Newark
- Newcastle
- Oxford
- Shirley

== California ==
- Brentwood
- Chatsworth
- Chester
- Exeter
- Hollywood
- Kensington
- Lancasterl
- Manchester
- Newcastle
- Richmond
- Ryde
- Westminster
- Windsor

== Colorado ==
- Arlington
- Avon
- Brighton
- Bristol
- Hereford
- Wellington
- Westminster
- Windsor

== Connecticut ==
- Andover
- Ashford
- Avon
- Berkshire
- Bolton
- Bristol
- Canterbury
- Cheshire
- Chester
- Chesterfield
- Colchester
- Colebrook
- Cornwall
- Coventry
- Danbury
- Derby
- Durham
- East Hampton
- East Windsor
- Easton
- Ellington
- Enfield
- Essex
- Farmington
- Glastonbury
- Granby
- Greenwich
- Guilford
- Hampton
- Hartford
- Kent
- Killingworth
- Litchfield
- Manchester
- Mansfield
- Marlborough
- Meriden
- Middlesex County
- Milford
- New Britain
- New London
- Newington
- Norfolk
- Norwich
- Oxford
- Plymouth
- Portland
- Preston
- Salisbury
- Stafford
- Stamford
- Stratford
- Tolland
- Torrington
- Wallingford
- Waterford
- Weston
- Westport
- Willington
- Wilton
- Winchester
- Windsor
- Windsor Locks
- Woodstock

== Delaware ==
- Arden
- Camden
- Canterbury
- Dover
- Harrington
- Kent County
- Lancashire
- Lewes
- Lincoln
- Middletown
- Milford
- Milton
- Newark
- Seaford
- Sussex County
- Townsend
- Warwick
- Wilmington

== Florida ==
- Acton
- Aldrige
- Alford
- Alton
- Amesbury Circle
- Amelia Island
- Andover
- Arlington
- Ashbourne Drive
- Ashbury Lane
- Avon Park
- Banbury
- Bath Lane
- Baxter
- Beauclerc
- Bedford Road
- Beechwood
- Berkshire Lakes
- Beresford
- Beverly Beach
- Birmingham Drive
- Bloxham
- Boston Street
- Brentwood
- Bridgewater
- Brighton Bay
- Bristol
- Buckingham
- Burlington Heights
- Burlington Oaks
- Caldwell Terrace
- Cambridge Road
- Camden Square
- Canterbury
- Carlisle
- Carlton, Pinellas County
- Carlton, St. Lucie County
- Charlotte Beach
- Charlotte County
- Charlotte Harbor
- Charlotte Park
- Charlotte Square
- Chatham
- Chelmsford
- Chelsea
- Chelsea Place
- Cheshire Drive
- Chester
- Chesterfield Heights
- Chichester
- Colchester Court
- Concord, Gadsden County
- Concord, Leon County
- Cornwall
- Cornwell
- Covington Park
- Crawford
- Cumberland
- Cuxham Drive
- Darlington
- Davenport
- Denham
- Derbyshire Road
- Derby Woods
- Devon
- Devonshire
- Dorset
- Dorchester
- Dover
- Dovercourt Lane
- Dunsford Terrace
- Durham
- Eastbrook
- Eastgate, Orange County
- Eastgate, Manatee County
- Eastgate, Sarasota County
- East Hill
- Effingham Road
- Essington Lane
- Essex Lane
- Essex Street
- Ewell
- Exeter
- Falmouth
- Faringdon Drive
- Faversham Circle
- Flamborough Drive
- Fordham Drive
- Fort Pierce
- Glastonbury Circle
- Gloucester Court
- Gotham Court
- Grantham Drive
- Greenacres
- Greenfield, Columbia County
- Greenfield, Duval County
- Greenfield, Pasco County
- Greenhead
- Greenwich
- Grimsby Lane
- Guilford
- Halifax River
- Hampshire
- Hampshire Hills
- Hampstead Lane
- Hampton
- Harpswell Drive
- Harrington
- Harrington Lake
- Harwich Circle
- Hastings
- Haverhill
- Hawkesbury Way
- Haynes
- Heathrow
- Hillsboro Beach
- Hillsborough County
- Hillsborough River
- Holly Hill
- Hollywood
- Horton Shores
- Huntington, Marion County
- Huntington, Putnam County
- Hutton Court
- Hyde Park
- Inglewood
- Inwood
- Kensington Park
- Kent
- Keswick
- Kingsford
- Kingsland
- Kingsley Plantation
- King Charles Circle
- King Edward Drive
- King George Estates
- King Henry Avenue
- King Henry Road
- King Richard Lane
- Kingston
- Lake George
- Lancaster
- Langdon Beach
- Lavenham Circle
- Layton
- Lexington
- Lincoln
- Liverpool
- Liverpool Island
- Lockwood, Levy County
- Lockwood, Orange County
- London Drive
- Longwood
- Lundy
- Lymington Circle
- Manchester
- Manchester Lakes
- Mansfield Heights
- Margate
- Marlborough
- Melbourne
- Middlesex Road
- Mulberry
- Newberry
- Newburn
- Newcastle
- New London Street
- Newmarket
- New River, Broward County
- Norfolk Street
- Northumberland Avenue
- Northwood, Alachua County
- Northwood, Palm Beach County
- Norwich Circle
- Notting Hill
- Nottingham
- Nottingham Street
- Oxford
- Parham Heights
- Pembridge Avenue
- Plymouth
- Port Charlotte
- Portland
- Portsmouth Lane
- Prince Albert Court
- Prince John Lane
- Prince Michael Lane
- Queen Anne Boulevard
- Queen Anne Court
- Queen Anne Road
- Queen Elizabeth Court
- Queen Elizabeth Way
- Queen Victoria Avenue
- Queen Victoria Drive
- Queens Park
- Queensway Road
- Ramsey Beach
- Reading Road
- Richmond
- Ridgewood
- Royston Bend
- Riverdale
- Runnymede
- Rutland
- Salisbury Road
- Sandringham Road
- Saxton
- Scarborough
- Sheffield Circle
- Sherwood Forest
- Shrewsbury Lane
- Shrewsbury Road
- Somerset
- Southbank
- Southend
- Southgate
- Southminster Circle
- Southport
- Southside
- Springfield
- St. Catherine
- Staffordshire Drive
- Sudbury Lane
- Sunbury Drive
- Sunderland Road
- Suffolk Road
- Surrey Avenue
- Sussex
- Sussex Place
- Templeton Lane
- Tewkesbury Trace
- Thornbury Court
- Thornton Park
- Tilbury Court
- Tisbury Lane
- Upshire Path
- Uxbridge Lane
- Walsingham
- Warrington
- Warwick Hills
- Washington County
- Watergate
- Wellington
- Wembley Way
- Westbury
- Westchester
- Westminster
- Westmoreland
- Westside
- Whitby Road
- Wickham Park
- Winchester Estates
- Windermere
- Windlesham Court
- Windsor, Alachua County
- Windsor, Indian River County
- Woodburn
- Woodstock
- Worthington Springs
- Victoria Park
- York
- Yorkshire

== Georgia ==
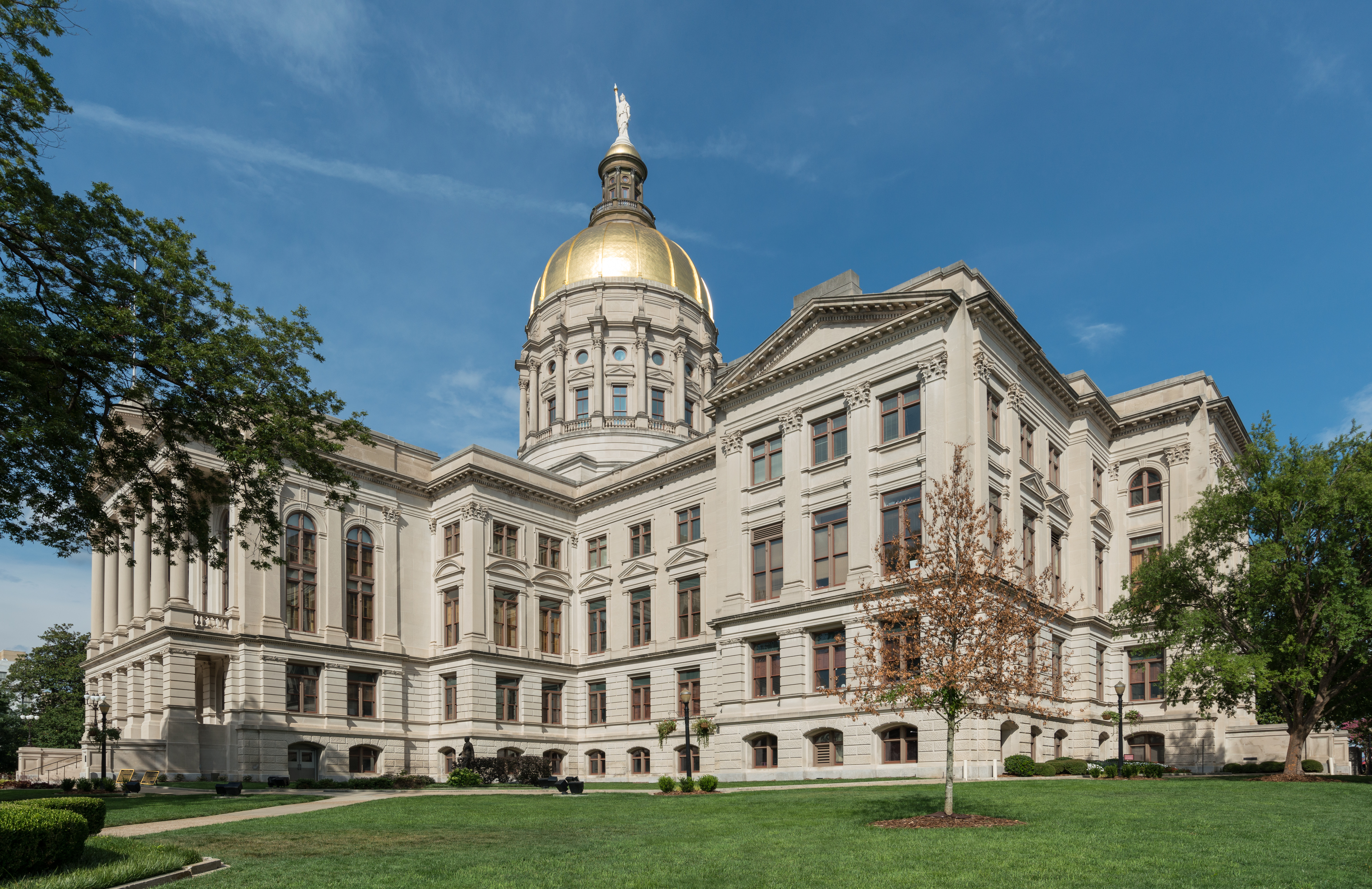
Georgia was named after George II of Great Britain, who signed the charter creating the colony of Georgia on April 21, 1732.

- Bainbridge
- Barwick
- Boston
- Chatsworth
- Claxton
- Covington
- Hull
- Manchester
- Mansfield
- Oxford
- Preston
- Putney
- Royston
- Warwick
- Washington
- Winchester

== Hawaii ==
- Whitmore Village

== Idaho ==
- New Plymouth

== Illinois ==
- Birmingham Township
- Chester
- Chesterfield
- Colchester
- Cumberland County
- Enfield
- Hull
- Huntley
- Manchester
- Truro Township
- Winchester
- Woodstock

== Indiana ==
- Avon
- Bedford
- Bristol
- Carlisle
- Cumberland
- Darlington
- Manchester
- Manchester Township
- New Carlisle
- New London
- Oxford
- Plymouth
- Washington
- Winchester
- Worthington

== Iowa ==
- Abingdon
- Ackworth
- Alton
- Bedford
- Birmingham
- Brighton
- Cambridge
- Carlisle
- Chatsworth
- Chelsea
- Cumberland
- Derby
- Dorchester
- Epworth
- Essex
- Hampton
- Hull
- Keswick
- Leeds
- Manchester
- Matlock
- New London
- Otley
- Oxford
- Radcliffe
- Sheffield
- Stockport
- Washington
- Waterloo

== Kansas ==
- Alton
- Bentley
- Berwick
- Buxton
- Clayton
- Derby
- Devon
- Effingham
- Farlington
- Kensington
- Lancaster
- Lincoln
- Manchester
- Oxford
- Richmond
- Stafford
- Wakefield
- Washington
- Westmoreland
- Winchester

== Kentucky ==
- Barnsley
- Birmingham
- Boston, Louisville
- Boston, Nelson County
- Bromley
- Cambridge
- Carlisle
- Cumberland County
- Cumberland Falls
- Cumberland Gap
- Cumberland Plateau

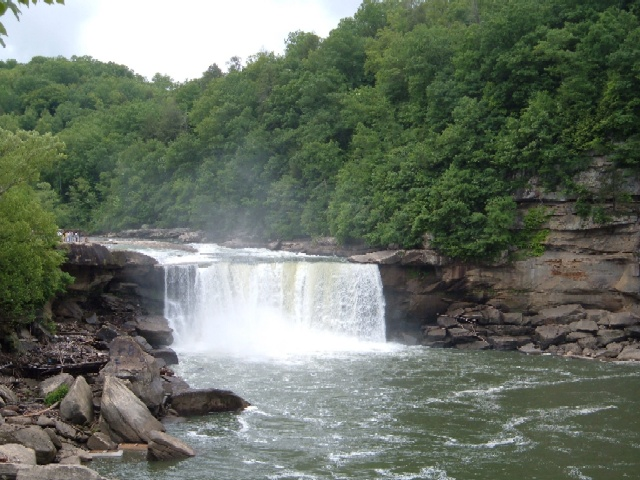
The English county name "Cumberland" is commonly replicated in Appalachia, such as at Cumberland River (pictured).

- Cumberland River
- Dover
- Falmouth
- London
- Manchester
- Middlesboro
- Richmond
- Somerset
- Williba
- Winchester

== Maine ==
- Acton
- Alton
- Andover
- Avon
- Bath
- Beddington
- Berwick
- Biddeford
- Boothbay
- Bradford
- Bristol
- Buxton
- Cambridge
- Chelsea
- Cumberland
- Cumberland County
- Durham
- Exeter
- Falmouth
- Harpswell
- Kittery
- Leeds
- Limington
- Manchester
- New Gloucester
- Oxford
- Portland
- Scarborough
- Waltham
- Wells
- Yarmouth
- York
- York County

== Maryland ==
- Abingdon
- Barton
- Bristol
- Cambridge
- Cheltenham
- Chester
- Cumberland
- Doncaster
- Essex
- Hampstead
- Hillsborough
- Kensington
- Kent
- Manchester
- Millington
- Nottingham
- Olney
- Oxford
- Salisbury
- Sunderland
- Warwick
- Westminster

== Massachusetts ==
- Abington
- Acton
- Amesbury
- Andover
- Arlington
- Attleboro
- Avon
- Barnstable
- Bedford
- Beverly
- Billerica
- Blandford
- Bolton
- Boston
- Boxford
- Bradford
- Braintree
- Bridgewater
- Bridgewater (CDP)
- East Bridgewater
- West Bridgewater
- Brighton
- Brimfield
- Bristol
- Burlington (Bridlington)
- Cambridge
- Carlisle
- Chatham
- Chelmsford
- Chelsea
- Chester
- Chesterfield
- Chilmark
- Concord
- Dartmouth
- Dedham
- Dorchester
- Dover
- Dunstable
- Duxbury
- Duxbury (CDP)
- South Duxbury
- Essex
- Essex County
- Falmouth
- Falmouth (CDP)
- East Falmouth
- North Falmouth
- West Falmouth
- Framingham
- Gloucester
- Grafton
- Great Barrington
- Groton
- Hadley
- Halifax
- Harwich
- Hardwick
- Hatfield
- Haverhill
- Hingham
- Hingham (CDP)
- Hull
- Hyde Park
- Ipswich
- Islington
- Kingston
- Leeds
- Lancaster
- Leicester
- Leominster
- Lexington
- Lincoln
- Ludlow
- Lynn
- Malden
- Manchester
- Mansfield
- Marlborough
- Marshfield
- Medford
- Medway
- Middleborough
- Middlesex County
- Milford
- Milton
- Needham
- Newbury
- New Ashford
- New Bedford
- Newton
- Norfolk
- Norfolk County
- Northampton
- Norton
- Norwood
- Oakham
- Oxford
- Petersham
- Plymouth
- Plymouth Beach
- Plymouth Center
- Plymouth County
- North Plymouth
- South Plymouth
- West Plymouth
- Plympton
- Raynham
- Reading
- Rochester
- Rowley
- Rutland
- Salisbury
- Sandwich
- Sheffield
- Shrewsbury
- Somerset
- Southampton
- Springfield
- Stockbridge
- Stoneham
- Stoughton
- Stow (Stowe)
- Sturbridge (Stourbridge)
- Sudbury
- Suffolk County
- Sunderland
- Sutton
- Taunton
- Templeton
- Tewksbury
- Tisbury
- West Tisbury
- Topsfield
- Truro
- North Truro
- Upton
- Uxbridge
- Wakefield
- Waltham
- Wareham
- Wareham Center
- West Wareham
- Warwick
- Westfield
- Westport
- Westwood
- Weymouth
- Wilbraham
- Winchester
- Windsor
- Woburn
- Worcester
- Wrentham
- Yarmouth

== Michigan ==
- Avon
- Baltimore Township
- New Baltimore
- Bath
- Berkley
- Birmingham
- Brighton
- Camden
- Chelsea
- Chesterfield
- Elmhurst
- Farmington
- Garden City
- Hastings
- Houghton
- Kensington
- Kent County
- Lincoln
- Lincoln Park
- Manchester
- Milford
- New Boston
- New Haven
- Oxford
- Plymouth
- Richmond
- Rochester
- Rockwood
- Rothbury
- Royal Oak
- Shelby Township
- Somerset Township
- Sterling Heights
- Surrey Township
- Warren
- Washington Township
- Waterford
- Waverly
- Windsor
- Wexford

== Minnesota ==
- Bradford
- Bristol Township
- Kensington
- Kent
- London
- London Township
- Manchester
- New Brighton
- New London
- Plymouth
- Rochester

== Mississippi ==
- Bolton
- Bude
- Oxford
- Plymouth
- Suffolk

== Missouri ==
- Alton
- Birmingham
- Brentwood
- Chesterfield
- Clayton
- Essex
- Farmington
- Lancaster
- Lincoln
- Manchester
- Mansfield
- New London
- Plymouth
- Salisbury
- Shrewsbury
- Washington
- Wellington
- Winchester
- Windsor

== Montana ==
- Chester

== Nebraska ==
- Amherst
- Burwell
- Cambridge
- Crofton
- Danbury
- Exeter
- Hartington
- Hastings
- Hampton
- Lancaster County
- Lincoln
- Lexington
- London
- Oxford
- Sutton
- Wakefield
- Washington
- Weston
- York

== Nevada ==
- Ely

== New Hampshire ==
- New Hampshire — named after Hampshire by governor John Mason.
- Alton
- Andover
- Barrington
- Bath
- Bedford
- Bradford
- Brentwood
- Bridgewater
- Bristol
- Canterbury
- Chatham
- Chesham
- Chester
- Chichester
- Concord
- Croydon
- Derry
- Dorchester
- Dover
- Durham
- Epping
- Epsom
- Exeter
- Hampstead
- Hampton
- Kensington
- Lancaster
- Lincoln
- Litchfield
- Lyme
- Manchester
- Marlborough
- Marlow
- New Castle
- New Ipswich
- New London
- Newington
- Newmarket
- Northumberland
- Nottingham
- Plaistow
- Portsmouth
- Richmond
- Rochester
- Rye
- Sandown
- Stratham (from Streatham)
- Strafford (from Stratford)
- Surry (from Surrey)
- Tamworth
- Wakefield
- Westmoreland
- Wilton
- Woodstock

== New Jersey ==
- New Jersey itself
- Barrington
- Bedminster
- Birmingham
- Bloomsbury
- Bridgewater
- Camden, New Jersey
- Chester
- Clifton
- Cumberland County
- Dover
- Essex County
- Evesham Township
- Gloucester City
- Gloucester County
- Gloucester Township
- Greenwich
- Lyndhurst
- Manchester
- Margate City
- Middlesex
- Middlesex County
- Newark
- Ridgewood
- Ringwood
- Shrewsbury
- Shrewsbury Township
- Southampton
- Stafford Township
- Stratford
- Somerset
- Somerset County
- Sussex
- Sussex County
- Ventnor
- Washington
- Weymouth
- Woodbury
- Woolwich

== New Mexico ==
- Farmington

== New York ==
- New York itself
- Albany county
- Allerton
- Andover
- Ardsley
- Bath
- Bedford
- Bedford Hills
- Boston
- Brentwood
- Bridgehampton
- Bridgewater (town)
- Bridgewater (village)
- Brighton, Erie County
- Brighton, Franklin County
- Brighton, Monroe County
- Brighton Beach
- Bristol
- Cambridge
- Carlisle
- Chatham
- Chelsea
- Chester, Orange County
- Chester, Warren County
- Chesterfield
- Chichester
- Colchester
- Cornwall
- Cornwall-on-Hudson
- Coventry
- Cumberland County
- Durham
- Elmhurst, Chautauqua County
- Elmhurst, Queens
- Essex
- Fordham
- Garden City
- Gravesend
- Greenwich
- Greenwich Village
- Hastings-on-Hudson
- Hempstead (town)
- Hempstead (village)
- Huntington (CDP)
- Huntington (town)
- Islip (CDP)
- Islip (town)
- Kensington, Nassau County
- Kensington, Brooklyn
- Kew Gardens
- Kingsbridge
- Kingston
- Lancaster
- Leeds
- Leicester
- Lincoln
- Liverpool
- Manchester
- Middlesex
- New Brighton
- New Castle
- New Hartford
- New Suffolk
- New Windsor
- New York City
- Norfolk
- Northampton, Fulton County
- Northampton, Suffolk County
- Northumberland
- Norwich
- Oxford
- Plymouth
- Reading
- Riverhead (CDP)
- Riverhead (town)
- Rochdale
- Rochester
- Roxbury
- Rutland
- Rye
- Salisbury
- St. Albans
- Scarborough
- Scarsdale
- Seaford
- Shoreham
- Somerset
- Southampton
- South Bristol
- Southold (CDP)
- Southold (town)
- Springfield
- Stafford
- Stamford
- Stamford (village)
- Suffolk County
- Upton
- Wainscott
- Warwick
- Warwick (village)
- Westbury
- West Brighton
- Windsor
- Woodbury, Nassau County
- Woodbury, Orange County
- Woodstock
- Worcester
- York
- Yorkshire
- Yorktown

== North Carolina ==
- Bath
- Burlington
- Camden
- Camden County
- Chatham County
- Cumberland County
- Dalton
- Danbury
- Durham
- Enfield
- Guilford County
- Hertford
- Hertford County
- Hillsborough
- Leicester
- Lincoln County
- Macclesfield
- Middlesex
- Mount Pleasant
- New London
- Oxford
- Plymouth
- Raleigh
- Richmond County
- Rockingham
- Salisbury
- Southport
- Surry (Surrey)
- Wentworth
- Warrenton (Warrington, Cheshire)
- Wilmington

== North Dakota ==
- Berwick
- Harlow
- Leeds
- New England
- Norwich
- Rugby
- Surrey
- Tunbridge
- Warwick
- Watford City
- York

== Ohio ==
- Amberley
- Andover
- Avon
- Avon Lake
- Bath, Allen County
- Bath, Greene County
- Bath, Summit County
- Bedford
- Bedford Heights
- Berwick
- Bexley
- Birmingham, Erie County
- Birmingham, Guernsey County
- Brighton
- Bristol
- Camden
- Carlisle
- Cheshire
- Chatham
- Chester
- Coventry
- Cumberland
- Derby
- Dorset
- Dover
- Dover Township, Athens County
- Dover Township, Fulton County
- Dover Township, Tuscarawas County
- Dover Township, Union County
- Durham Township
- East Liverpool
- Essex
- Grafton
- Greenwich
- Guilford
- Kensington
- Lancaster
- Litchfield
- Liverpool Township, Medina County
- Liverpool Township, Columbiana County
- London
- New Carlisle
- New London
- Lyme
- Malvern
- Manchester
- Mayfield
- Mayfield Heights
- New Lyme Township
- Nottingham Township
- Norwich
- Oxford
- Plymouth
- Portsmouth
- Reading
- Rochester Township
- Salisbury
- Sheffield
- Somerset
- Truro Township
- Windsor
- York Township

== Oklahoma ==
- Chelsea
- Manchester (disputed; see footnote)
- Newcastle
- Warwick

== Oregon ==
- Portland, Oregon
- Sherwood

== Pennsylvania ==
- Alden (derived from Alden Valley, Lancashire)
- Andreas (from Andreas, Isle of Man)
- Aston
- Barnsley
- Bath
- Bedford
- Bedminster
- Berks County (short for "Berkshire")
- Berwick
- Birmingham, Chester County
- Birmingham, Huntingdon County
- Black Heath (derived from either Blackheath, London or Blackheath, West Midlands)
- Brentwood
- Brighton
- Bristol
- Bristol Township
- Buckingham
- Bucks County (short for "Buckinghamshire")
- Carlisle
- Cheltenham
- Cheltenham Township
- Chester
- Cheswick
- Croydon
- Cumberland County
- Darby (from the phonetic pronunciation of "Derby")
- Darlington
- Devon
- Dover
- Easton (derived from Easton Neston, an estate in Northamptonshire)
- East Huntingdon Township
- East York
- Elmhurst
- Emsworth
- Exeter
- Essington
- Falmouth
- Freeland
- Grantham
- Halifax
- Hereford
- Hereford Township
- Horsham
- Huntingdon
- Huntington
- Hyde Park
- Kensington
- Kidder Township (derived from Kidderminster, Worcestershire)
- Kingston
- Lancaster
- Lancaster County
- Lancaster Township, Butler County
- Lancaster Township, Lancaster County
- Liverpool
- Liverpool Township
- Lowhill Township (derived from Low Hill, Wolverhampton, West Midlands)
- Lynn Township (derived from King's Lynn, Norfolk)
- Malvern
- Manchester
- Mayfair
- Middlesex Township
- New Brighton
- New Castle
- New Cumberland
- New Kensington
- New London
- New Oxford
- New Stanton
- New Wilmington
- Northampton
- Northampton County
- Northumberland
- Northumberland County
- Norwood
- Nottingham
- Nottingham Township
- Olney
- Oxford
- Plymouth
- Reading
- Richmond Township
- Rochester
- Romney
- Salisbury Township
- Sheffield
- Shrewsbury
- Somerset
- Southampton
- Southwark
- South Huntingdon Township
- Sunbury (derived from Sunbury-on-Thames, Surrey)
- Telford
- Trafford
- Warminster
- Warrington Township, Bucks County
- Warrington Township, York County
- Warwick Township, Bucks County
- Warwick Township, Chester County
- Warwick Township, Lancaster County
- Washington
- Westmoreland County
- Whitehall
- Yeadon
- York
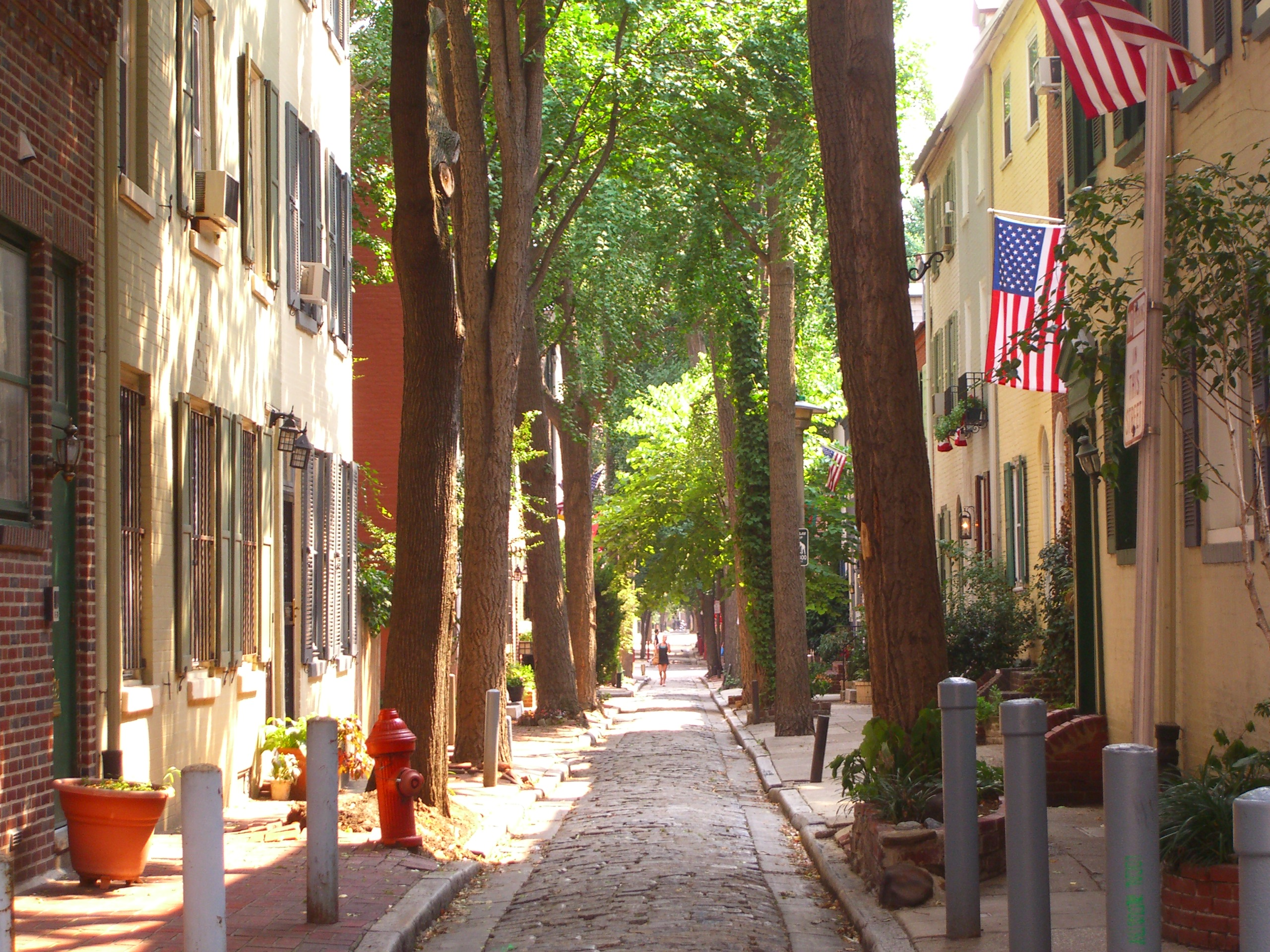
Pennsylvania and Delaware Valley were settled by Quakers reflecting this settlement.

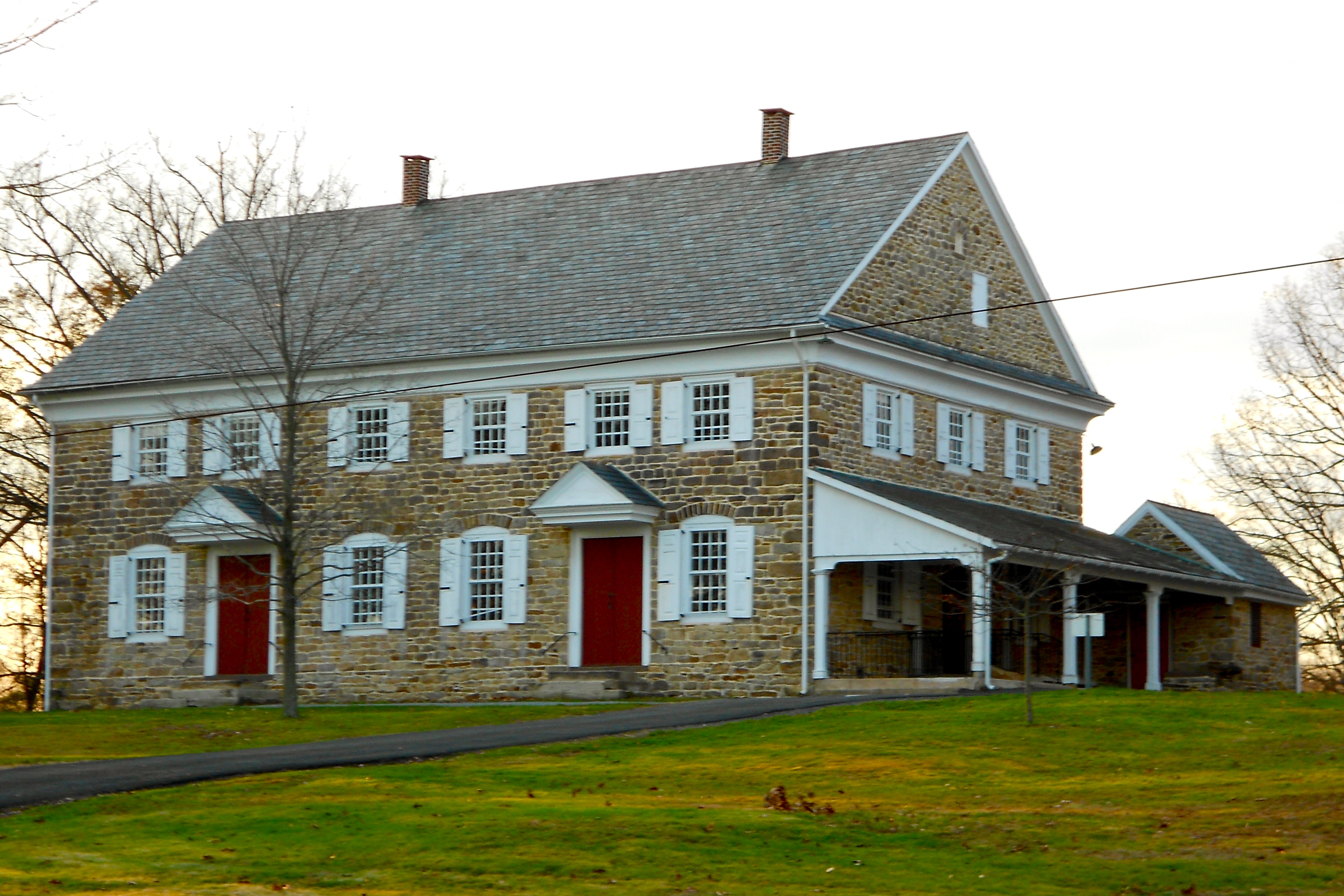
Quaker architecture in the state mirrors that in England.

== Rhode Island ==
- Barrington
- Bradford
- Bristol
- Bristol County
- Coventry
- Cumberland
- East Greenwich
- Exeter
- Elmhurst
- Gloucester
- Kent County
- Lincoln
- Little Compton
- New Shoreham
- Portsmouth
- Smithfield
- Tiverton
- Warren
- Warwick
- West Greenwich
- West Warwick
- Westerly
- Wickford

== South Carolina ==
- Barnwell
- Beaufort
- Camden
- Carlisle
- Chesterfield
- Darlington
- Dorchester
- Edgefield
- Effingham
- Gresham
- Hampton
- Lancaster
- Newberry
- Westminster
- Willington
- Windsor
- York

== South Dakota ==
- Andover
- Arlington
- Avon
- Bath
- Brentford
- Bristol
- Chelsea
- Chester
- Hereford
- Ipswich
- Manchester
- Oldham
- Rutland

== Tennessee ==
- Bransford
- Brentwood
- Bristol
- Cumberland County
- Fairfield Glade (derived from Fairfield, Bedfordshire)
- Harrogate
- London
- Manchester
- Portland
- Springfield
- Westmoreland
- Woodbury

== Texas ==
- Arlington
- Bedford
- Bristol
- Caldwell
- Derby
- Hereford
- Liverpool
- London
- Newcastle
- Richmond
- Sheffield
- Southampton
- Stamford
- Wellington
- Wortham

== Utah ==
- Croydon
- Leamington
- Leeds

== Vermont ==
- Andover
- Barnet
- Berkshire
- Bradford
- Brighton
- Bridgewater
- Bristol
- Burlington
- Cambridge
- Chelsea
- Chester
- Colchester
- Coventry
- Cumberland County
- Derby
- Derby Center
- Derby Line
- Dorset
- Essex
- Essex County
- Guilford
- Kirby
- Leicester
- Maidstone
- Manchester
- Milton
- Norwich
- Middlesex
- Plymouth
- Putney
- Reading
- Richmond
- Rochester
- Rutland
- Salisbury
- Sheffield
- Shrewsbury
- St. Albans (city)
- St. Albans (town)
- Stamford
- Stockbridge
- Stowe
- Sudbury
- Thetford
- Tunbridge
- Wells
- Weybridge
- Westminster
- Windham County
- Woodstock

== Virginia ==
- Abingdon
- Arlington
- Ashland
- Bedford
- Bristol
- Charles City County
- Chester
- Chesterfield
- Crewe
- Cumberland County
- Cumberland Mountains
- Dover
- Elmhurst
- Essex County, Virginia
- Falmouth
- Gloucester
- Gloucester County
- Gloucester Courthouse
- Gloucester Point
- Hampton
- Loudoun County
- Manchester
- Manchester, Chesterfield County
- Midlothian
- New Kent
- Norfolk
- Northumberland County
- Prince William County
- Richmond
- Shadwell
- Southampton
- Stafford
- Suffolk
- Sussex County
- Portsmouth
- Surry
- Isle of Wight County
- Northampton County
- Northumberland County
- Middlesex County
- Sussex
- Buckingham
- Wakefield
- Waverly
- Westmoreland County
- Woodstock
- Winchester
- Yorkshire
- Yorktown

== Washington ==
- The state itself is named after the first U.S. President, George Washington, whose surname was due to his family owning Washington Old Hall and land in Washington, Tyne and Wear.
- Bellingham
- Darrington
- Kent
- Malden
- Manchester
- Matlock
- Newcastle
- Port Townsend

== West Virginia ==
- Chester
- Elmhurst
- New Cumberland
- New Manchester
- London
- Romney
- St. Albans

== Wisconsin ==
- Bradford
- Bristol, Dane County
- Bristol, Kenosha County
- Cambridge
- Cumberland
- Dorchester
- Gillingham
- Hull, Marathon County
- Hull, Portage County
- Ipswich
- Lancaster
- Leeds
- Manchester, Green Lake County
- Manchester, Jackson County
- Middleton
- New Chester
- New London
- Oxford
- Plymouth
- Plymouth, Juneau County
- Plymouth, Rock County
- Plymouth, Sheboygan County
- Ripon
- Somerset
- Sussex
- Wellington

== Wyoming ==
- Bedford
- Newcastle
- Sussex
- Torrington

== Other ==
- New England

== See also ==
- Anglo-America
- British colonization of the Americas
- List of places named after places in the United States
- List of non-US places that have a US place named after them
