= Buttermilk Bay, Plymouth, Massachusetts =

Coordinates: 41.769°N 70.628°W

Buttermilk Bay is a neighborhood located in the Plymouth, Massachusetts village of South Plymouth. It is the southernmost neighborhood of Plymouth, and includes the section of town south of Massachusetts Route 25, at the border with Wareham and Bourne.

== Demographics ==
Buttermilk Bay is a non-census designated area of the town of Plymouth. Its population is approximately 835 people. Buttermilk Bay is the most inland inlet of Buzzards Bay MA, and contains the villages of Indian Heights, Indian Mound Beach, Hideaway Village, and others. It has a second inlet known as Little Buttermilk Bay. It is circumnavigated by Head-of-the-Bay Road. It's outlet into Buzzards Bay—known to locals as "The Channel" is a narrow waterway bridged by Route 28, eventually continuing into the Cape Cod Canal.

== Education ==
Students who reside in the Buttermilk Bay neighborhood of Plymouth attend elementary school at South Elementary in South Plymouth, middle school students attend Plymouth South Middle School, and high school students attend Plymouth South High School. In the past, due to the overflowing student enrollments of the 14 elementary schools in Plymouth, students who reside in Buttermilk Bay have been re-districted to numerous different elementary schools in the town. These students were basically re-districted to the school which had the most space available to accommodate them, not by which school was closest.

Before the Buttermilk Bay elementary school students were permanently districted to South Elementary in the 1999-2000 academic year, students attended Federal Furnace Elementary, which is located in North Plymouth and is a 40 minute drive from the Buttermilk Bay neighborhood. However, in 1998, South Elementary began a massive addition to the school in order to accommodate the re-districting of the Buttermilk Bay students to the school beginning in the 1999-2000 academic year. South Elementary is the closest elementary school in Plymouth to Buttermilk Bay. Ultimately, certain students from the West Plymouth area of Plymouth we re-districted to Federal Furnace to accommodate the loss of the Buttermilk Bay students.
