= Kings Pond (Plymouth, Massachusetts) =

Lake of the United States of America

- Location within Massachusetts Location within the United States
- Location: Plymouth, Massachusetts
- Coordinates: 41°54′36″N 70°42′20″W
- Basin countries: United States
- Surface area: 21 acres (8.5 ha)
- Settlements: West Plymouth

Kings Pond is a 21-acre (85,000 m^{2}) pond in the West Plymouth section of Plymouth, Massachusetts. The pond is located south of Little West Pond, Micajah Pond and Micajah Heights, and north of Curlew Pond. The water quality is impaired due to non-native aquatic plants.
