= Pembroke High School =

Coordinates: 42°3′12.6″N 70°47′52.6″W

Location
- 80 Learning Lane; Pembroke, MA 02359; United States

Information
- Type: Public
- Motto: Excellence in Education
- Established: 2004
- Superintendent: Eren Obey
- Principal: Marcus Talbot
- Teaching staff: 58.76 (FTE)
- Grades: 9–12
- Enrollment: 733 (2022–2023)
- Student to teacher ratio: 12.47
- Colors: Blue, Red & White
- Athletics conference: MIAA
- Nickname: Titans
- Newspaper: • Pembroke Sentinel • Solstice (Literary Magazine)

Pembroke High School, is a public secondary school located on 80 Learning Lane in Pembroke, Massachusetts, United States.

The school serves students in grades 9-12 and has an approximate student population of 930 students.

It is the only high school serving the town of Pembroke. Students come directly from Pembroke Community Middle School (PCMS). The three elementary schools in the town include Hobomock Elementary, Bryantville Elementary, and North Pembroke Elementary School.

== History ==
Pembroke High School was formed in 2004 when the town of Pembroke split away from the Silver Lake Regional School District over concerns about overcrowding, and that Pembroke consisted of half of the population of the then four town district. The building was constructed as the Pembroke campus of the Silver Lake Regional High School and opened in October 1976, and was subsequently the Silver Lake District's middle school.

Pembroke's middle school is located on Rte. 27, and was the Silver Lake Junior High School from 1968 to 1991, when the district's middle school shifted to the Learning Lane building. Upon Pembroke's secession from the Silver Lake district in 2004, the town repurchased the property, establishing it as the new Pembroke Middle School.

== Demographics ==
As of 2008, the population of the school was 98% white, with 10% of the student body of low income and 10% classified as special needs. 95% of targeted students met MCAS requirements for English, while 88% met MCAS requirements for mathematics.

== Athletics ==
The school's sports teams are known as the Titans, and the school colors are Blue, Red & White. Pembroke competes in the Patriot League. The Patriot League's members are Scituate, Quincy, Hanover, Middleborough, Duxbury, Hingham, Plymouth North, Plymouth South, Whitman-Hanson, North Quincy, and Silver Lake. The league is divided into two divisions, Patriot-Fisher and Patriot-Keenan. These divisions are divided up based on school population, with Pembroke being a member of the Patriot-Fisher division.
