= Plymouth High School =

Plymouth High School may refer to:

== United Kingdom ==
- Plymouth High School for Girls in Plymouth, Devon, England

== United States ==
- Plymouth High School (Indiana) in Plymouth, Indiana
- Plymouth High School (Michigan), part of Plymouth-Canton Educational Park
- Plymouth High School (North Carolina) in Plymouth, North Carolina
- Plymouth High School (Ohio) in Plymouth, Ohio
- Plymouth High School (Oregon), see St. Helens School District
- Plymouth High School (Wisconsin) in Plymouth, Wisconsin
- Plymouth North High School in Plymouth, Massachusetts, formerly Plymouth-Carver High School, and prior to that, Plymouth High School
- Plymouth Regional High School in Plymouth, New Hampshire
- Plymouth South High School in Plymouth, Massachusetts

== See also ==
- Plymouth-Whitemarsh High School in Plymouth Meeting, Pennsylvania, United States
- New Plymouth High School in New Plymouth, Idaho, United States
- New Plymouth Boys' High School in New Plymouth, New Zealand
- New Plymouth Girls' High School in New Plymouth, New Zealand
