= Little West Pond =

Lake of the United States of America

- Location within Massachusetts
- Location: Plymouth, Massachusetts
- Coordinates: 41°55′17″N 70°42′24″W
- Basin countries: United States
- Surface area: 25 acres (10 ha)
- Settlements: West Plymouth

Little West Pond is a 25-acre (100,000 m^{2}) pond in the West Plymouth section of Plymouth, Massachusetts. The pond is located northeast of, and is connected by a stream to, Big West Pond, west of Micajah Pond and Micajah Heights, and north of Kings Pond.
