= West Pond =

West Pond may refer to:

- West Pond (Big Moose, New York), U.S.
- West Pond, Jamaica Bay Wildlife Refuge, New York City, U.S.
- West Pond, a sidings area at Barry Docks, Wales
- West Pond, Parsonsfield, Maine, U.S.
- West Pond, on Massachusetts Route 85, U.S.
- West Pond, Union Bay Natural Area, Seattle, Washington, U.S.
- West Pond, The Royal Palace, Angkor Thom
- Xitang ('West Pond'), a town in Jiashan County, Zhejiang, China

== See also ==
- Little West Pond, in the West Plymouth section of Plymouth, Massachusetts
