= Neighborhoods in Plymouth, Massachusetts =

Neighborhoods and coastal communities in Plymouth, Massachusetts

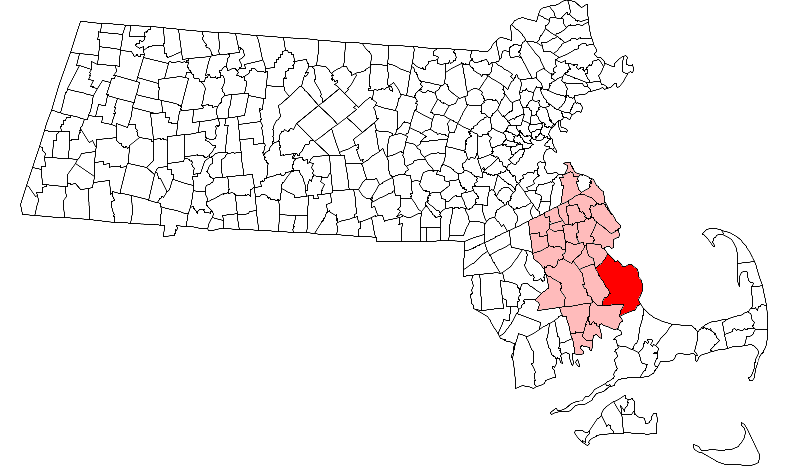
Location of Plymouth within the state of Massachusetts.

There are several neighborhoods in Plymouth, Massachusetts. With a total area of 134.0 mi^{2} (347.0 km^{2}), Plymouth is the largest municipality in Massachusetts by area. In addition, with a population of 51,701 at the 2000 census and an estimated population of 57,901 in 2007, Plymouth is the second-largest town in the state by population (after Framingham. (Framingham is actually now a city making Plymouth the largest town.) As such, Plymouth is home to many distinct neighborhoods and geographical locations.

The most prominent of Plymouth's neighborhoods is Plymouth Center, also referred to as Downtown Plymouth. It is home to Plymouth's town hall and harbor. The geographical regions of North Plymouth, South Plymouth, and West Plymouth are named based upon their relationship to Plymouth Center.

Plymouth has one of the longest coastlines of any town in Massachusetts, and makes up the entire western shore of Cape Cod Bay. The town is therefore home to a wide array of beach communities.

== List of neighborhoods ==
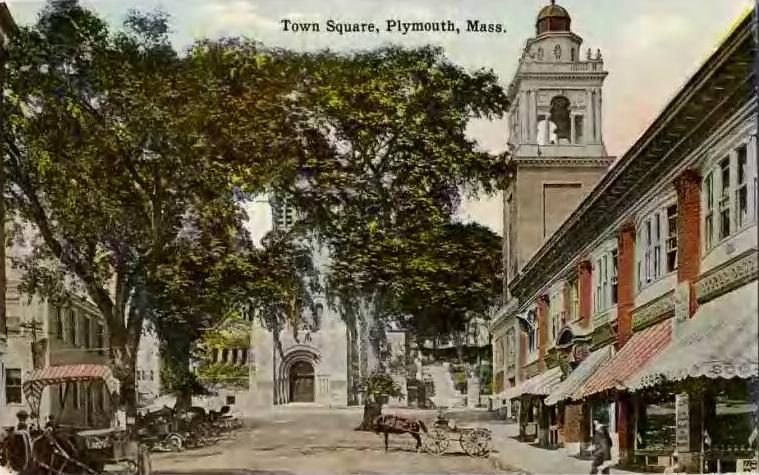
Plymouth Center as it appeared in 1910

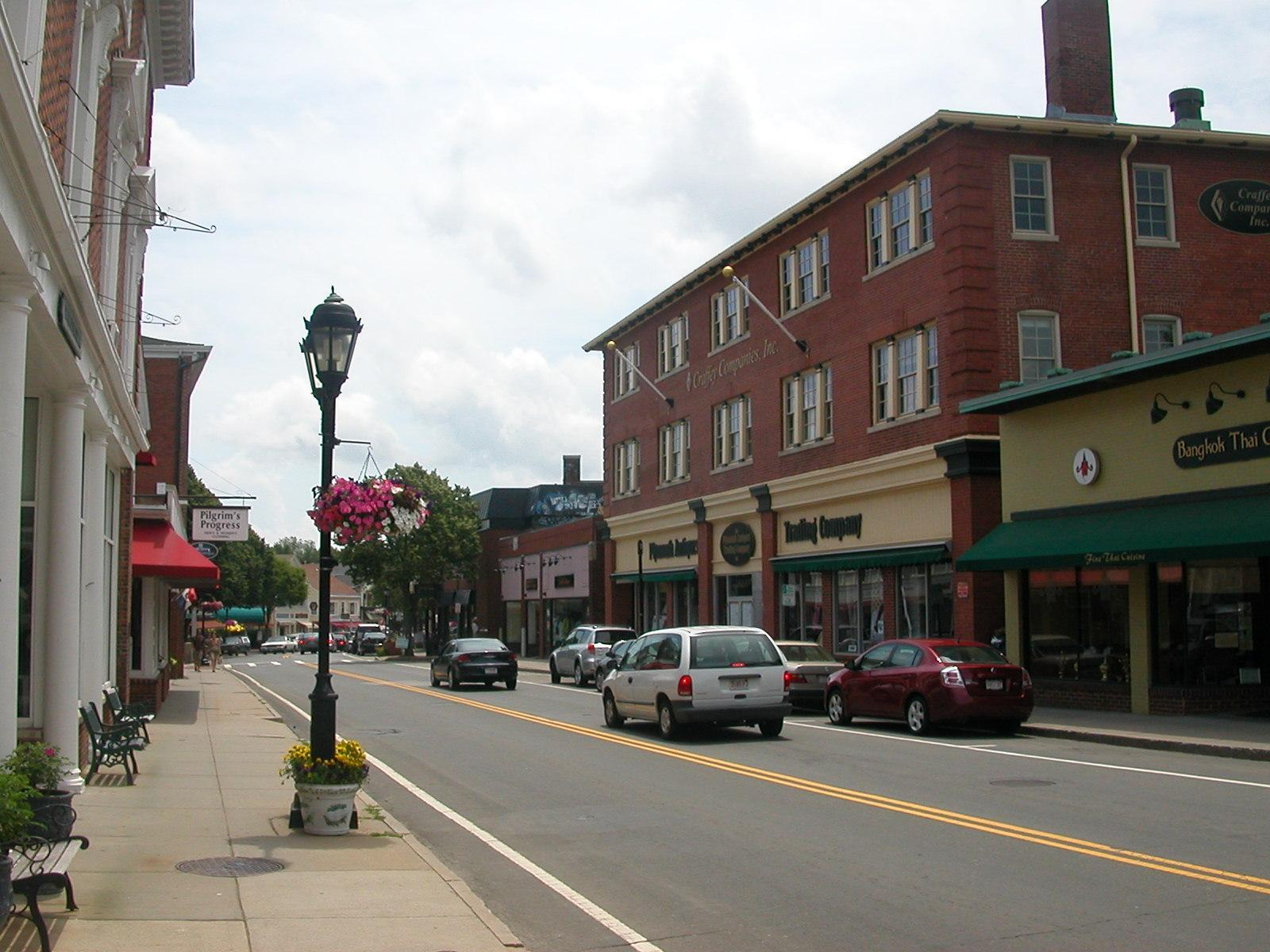
Court Street in Plymouth Center

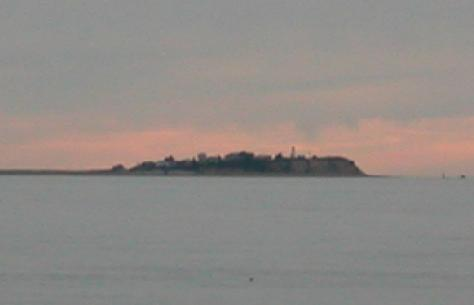
Saquish Neck, as viewed from Plymouth Beach

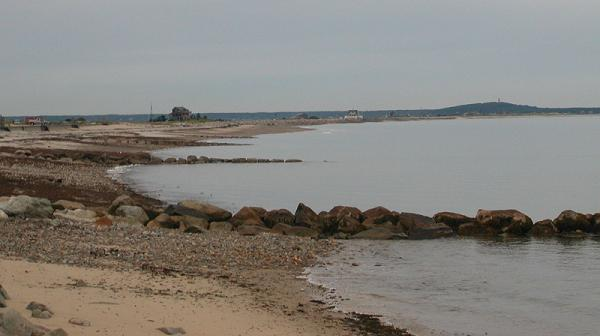
Plymouth Barrier Beach, viewed from Plymouth Beach village

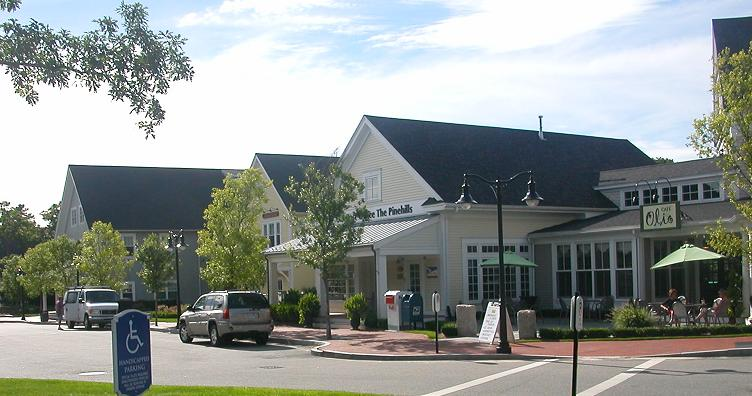
The Village Green of The Pinehills

- Plymouth Center
  - Harbor District
- North Plymouth
  - Cordage Park
- Saquish Neck (accessible only through Duxbury)
  - Gurnet Point
  - Saquish Head
- Clark's Island
- West Plymouth
  - Micajah Heights
  - Billington Sea
  - Darby
  - East Carver (a portion of this section of Carver extends over the town line into Plymouth)
- South Pond
- Wellingsley (Jabez Corner)
- Chiltonville
- Plymouth Beach
- South Plymouth
  - Rocky Point
  - The Pinehills
  - Buttermilk Bay
  - Manomet
    - Priscilla Beach
    - White Horse Beach
    - Manomet Heights
    - Manomet Bluffs
    - Indian Brook
    - Fishermans Landing
    - Churchill Landing
    - Colony Beach
    - Pilgrim Beach
    - Cedar Bushes
    - Shallow Pond Estates
    - Manomet Beach
  - Vallerville
    - Ocean Aire Beach
    - Surfside Beach
    - Bayside Beach
  - Ellisville
    - Harlow’s Landing
    - Eastland Heights
  - Cedarville
    - Nameloc Heights
    - Pondville
  - Halfway Pond
  - Long Pond
  - West Wind Shores

== See also ==
- Plymouth, Massachusetts
