= Plymouth Public Schools =

School district in Massachusetts, United States

Location
- Plymouth, Massachusetts United States

District information
- Type: Public
- Grades: Pre-K – 12
- Superintendent: Dr. Christopher S. Campbell
- Asst. superintendent(s): Dr. Stacey Rogers; Mr. Erik Cioffi
- Schools: 14
- Budget: $130,488,114 total $15,704 per pupil (2016)

Students and staff
- Students: 8110
- Teachers: 611
- Staff: 426

Other information
- Average SAT scores: 536 verbal 526 math 1062 total (2017-2018)
- Website: https://www.plymouth.k12.ma.us/

Plymouth Public Schools is a school district that serves Plymouth, Massachusetts. It operates 12 schools, making it one of the largest town school districts in the state. In June 2021, the Plymouth Public Schools were placed into a state program for schools or districts that disproportionately suspend non-white students or students with disabilities.

== Schools ==
=== Elementary schools ===
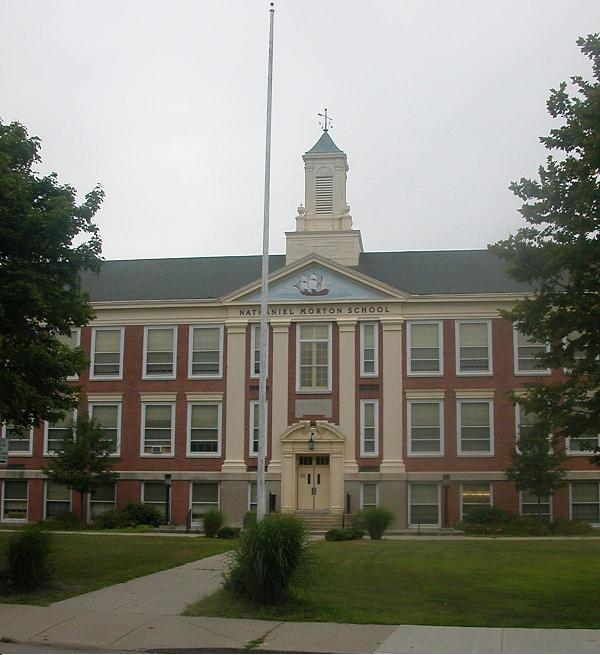
The Nathaniel Morton Elementary School in Plymouth Center

- South Elementary School - 686 Students
- Indian Brook Elementary School - 699 Students
- Nathaniel Morton Elementary School - 577 Students
- Federal Furnace School - 425 Students
- Manomet Elementary School - 344 Students
- West Elementary School - 420 Students
- Cold Spring Elementary School - 233 Students
- Hedge Elementary School-232

=== Middle schools ===
Grades 6-8

- Plymouth Community Intermediate School - 1,409 Students- Grades 6-8. Also known as PCIS, this school opened in January 1973. It was originally known as Plymouth Carver Intermediate School until Carver opened its own middle school. The current principal is Brian Palladino. School colors are purple, black and white. At one time PCIS was the only middle school in Plymouth and housed 2,200 students. There are 3 Current houses Gemini, Mercury, and Ranger. A Fourth house called Apollo was removed in 2012.
- Plymouth South Middle School - 882 Students - established in 1999. The colors are Green and Gold and the mascot is the Jaguar. The current principal is Joe Murphy. The school has 3 floors, with the grade 6 being on the 1st floor, and grades 7 & 8 being on the 2nd and 3rd floors. The school is rivals with PCIS, Carver Middle, and Sacred Heart. Some sports activities at Plymouth South Middle School include cross country, girls soccer, boys soccer, volleyball, track, girls basketball, boys basketball and field hockey.

=== High schools ===
Grades 9–12

- Plymouth North High School - 1,285 students - co-educational, public high school located south of Plymouth Center and adjacent to Jordan Hospital and the Plymouth County Courthouse.
- Plymouth South High School - 1,073 students - co-educational, public high school located near the Long Pond neighborhood and is almost adjacent to Myles Standish State Forest.

== See also ==
- List of school districts in Massachusetts
