= Plymouth Center, Massachusetts =

Plymouth, Massachusetts
- Census-designated place
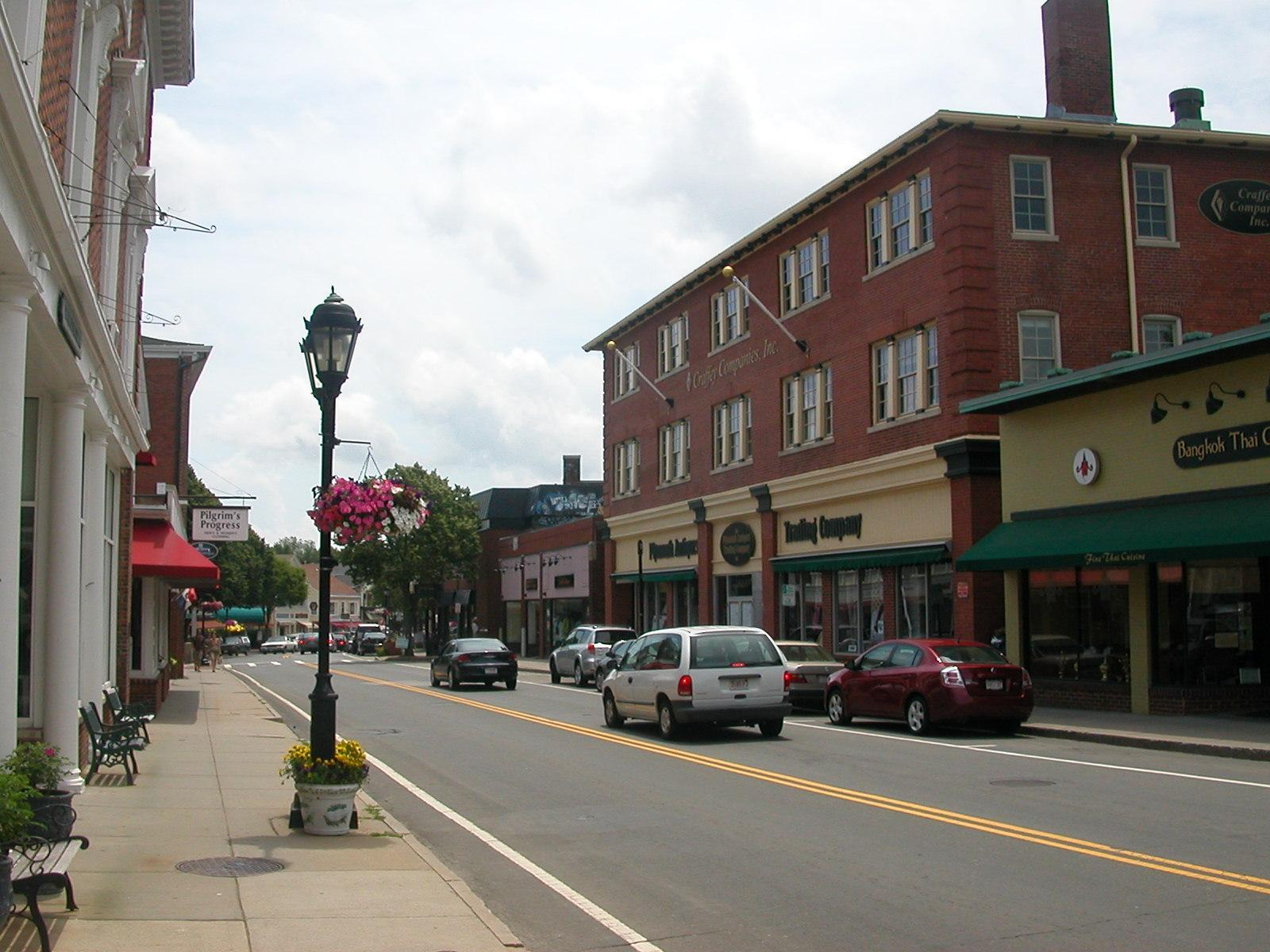
- Court Street in Plymouth, facing south

- Location within Plymouth County

- Location within the state of Massachusetts
- Coordinates: 41°57′21″N 70°40′0″W
- Country: United States
- State: Massachusetts
- County: Plymouth

Area
  - Total: 3.88 sq mi (10.06 km^{2})
  - Land: 2.24 sq mi (5.80 km^{2})
  - Water: 1.64 sq mi (4.26 km^{2})

Population (2020)
  - Total: 7,667
  - Density: 3,425.3/sq mi (1,322.53/km^{2})
- Time zone: UTC-5 (Eastern (EST))
  - Summer (DST): UTC-4 (EDT)
- ZIP Code: 02360 (Plymouth)
- FIPS code: 25-54275

Plymouth is a census-designated place (CDP) in the town of Plymouth in Plymouth County, Massachusetts, United States. It is often referred to as Downtown Plymouth or Plymouth Center. The population was 7,667 at the 2020 census.

Plymouth Center is considered to be the most prominent neighborhood of Plymouth. It is the location of Plymouth's town hall and of the town harbor. In addition, Plymouth Center is home to Plymouth Rock, the Pilgrim Hall Museum, and the Mayflower II.

The geographical locations of North, South, and West Plymouth are named in relation to Plymouth Center.

The post office located at the intersection of Main Street Extension and Leyden Street was the main post office in Plymouth until sometime in the 1970s, when the current main post office located in South Pond was built. The ZIP code for Plymouth Center (officially simply "Plymouth, MA") is 02361. Non-post office box holders in Plymouth Center use the zip code of 02360.

== Geography ==
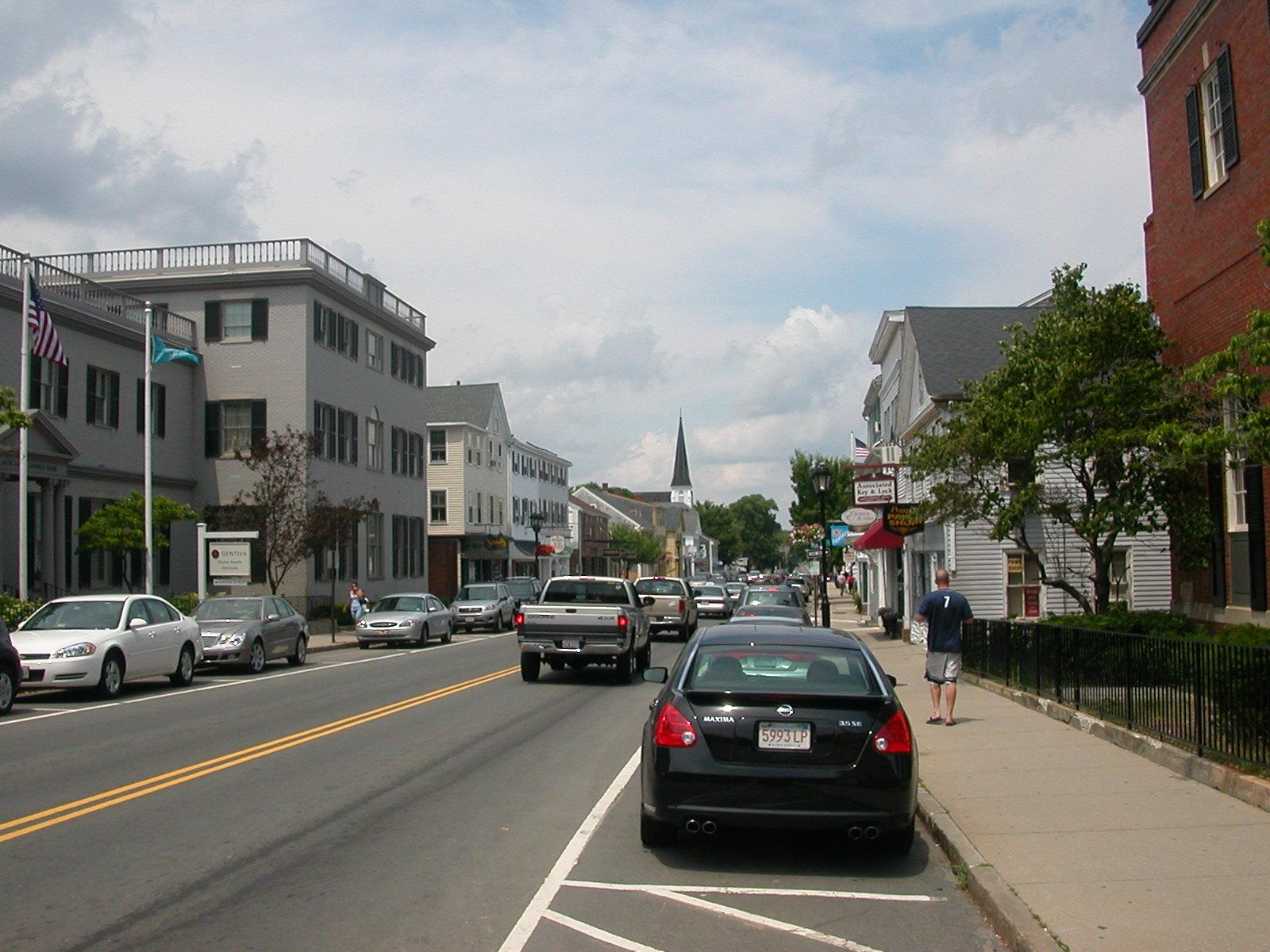
Court Street in Plymouth, facing north

Plymouth Center is located at 41°57′21″N 70°39′59″W (41.955841, -70.666549).

According to the United States Census Bureau, the CDP has a total area of 10.1 km^{2} (3.9 mi^{2}), of which 5.9 km^{2} (2.3 mi^{2}) is land and 4.3 km^{2} (1.6 mi^{2}) (42.20%) is water.

== Demographics ==
Historical population
Census	Pop.	Note	%±
2020	7,667		—
U.S. Decennial Census

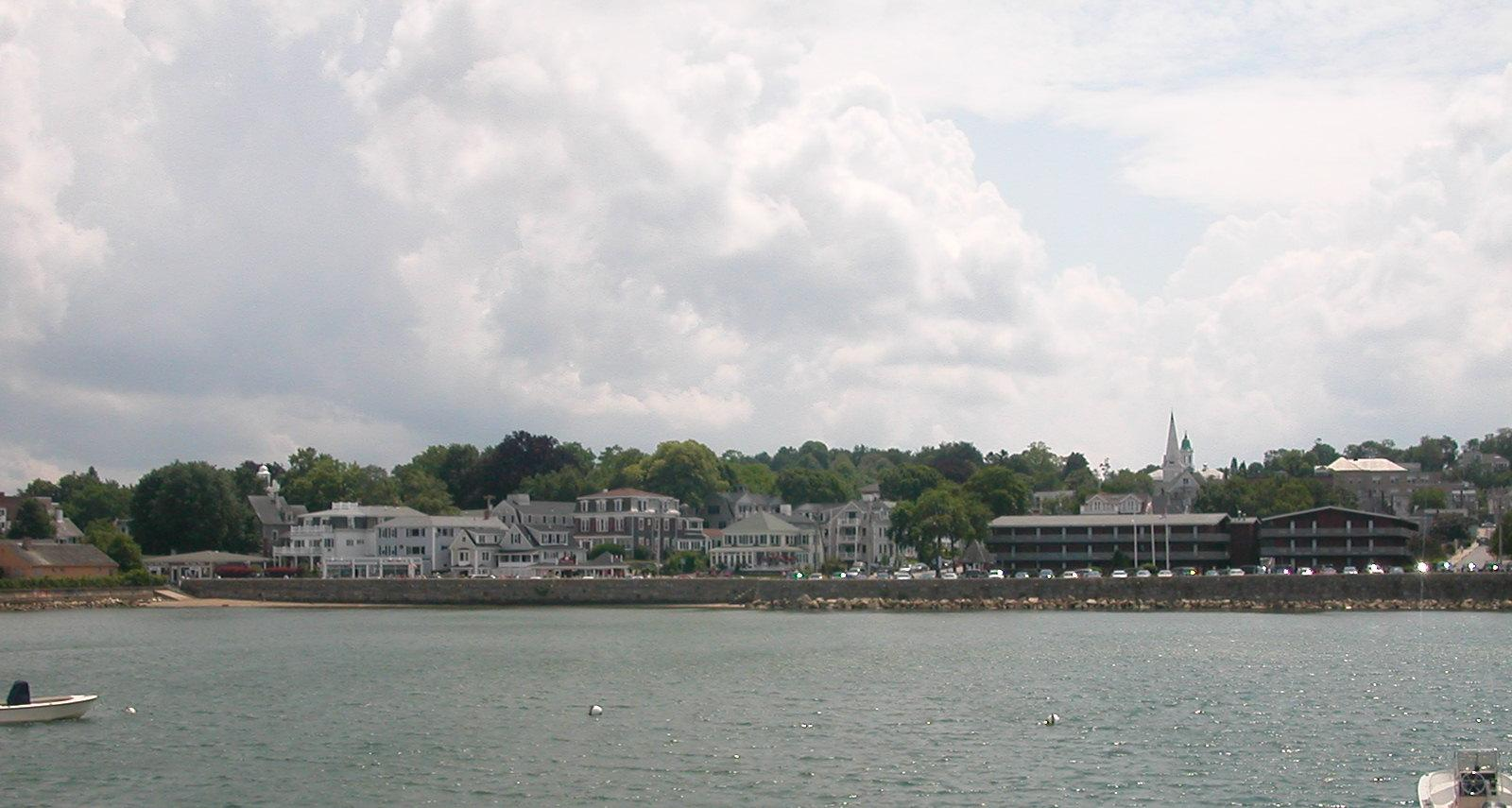
Waterfront of Plymouth Center

As of the census of 2000, there were 7,658 people, 3,286 households, and 1,744 families residing in the CDP. The population density was 1,308.3/km^{2} (3,390.2/mi^{2}). There were 3,420 housing units at an average density of 584.3/km^{2} (1,514.0/mi^{2}). The racial makeup of the CDP was 93.81% White, 2.30% Black or African American, 0.31% Native American, 0.94% Asian, 0.03% Pacific Islander, 0.89% from other races, and 1.72% from two or more races. Hispanic or Latino of any race were 1.20% of the population.

There were 3,286 households, out of which 25.8% had children under the age of 18 living with them, 35.8% were married couples living together, 13.7% had a female householder with no husband present, and 46.9% were non-families. 36.6% of all households were made up of individuals, and 13.3% had someone living alone who was 65 years of age or older. The average household size was 2.17 and the average family size was 2.90.

In the CDP, the population was spread out, with 20.4% under the age of 18, 7.1% from 18 to 24, 32.5% from 25 to 44, 21.6% from 45 to 64, and 18.4% who were 65 years of age or older. The median age was 38 years. For every 100 females, there were 83.3 males. For every 100 females age 18 and over, there were 77.5 males.

The median income for a household in the CDP was $39,759, and the median income for a family was $52,429. Males had a median income of $40,404 versus $30,431 for females. The per capita income for the CDP was $21,693. About 6.6% of families and 7.4% of the population were below the poverty line, including 11.3% of those under age 18 and 3.9% of those age 65 or over.
