= Curlew Pond =

Pond in Plymouth, Massachusetts, United States

- Location within Massachusetts
- Location: Plymouth, Massachusetts
- Coordinates: 41°53′25″N 70°41′45″W
- Type: Pond
- Basin countries: United States
- Surface area: 43 acres (17 ha)
- Average depth: 11 ft (3.4 m)
- Max. depth: 31 ft (9.4 m)

Curlew Pond is a 43-acre (170,000 m^{2}) natural warm water pond in Plymouth, Massachusetts, located in the Myles Standish State Forest.

Called "Clear Pond" and then "Clew Pond" in the 19th century, the pond is located north of Rocky Pond and south of Kings Pond. The average depth is 11 feet (3.4 m) and the maximum depth is 31 feet (9.4 m). The source for this pond is groundwater, and there is no outlet. Access to the pond, suitable for car top boats and canoes, is at the northern shore. There are two beaches located on both sides to the boat access.

About half of the pond is surrounded by the Curlew Pond public camping area of the Myles Standish State Forest, although a number of privately leased cottages ring the northeastern shore of the pond. The southern section is adjacent to the privately owned Blueberry Hill Camping Area.

The pond was in the vicinity of a large forest fire in 1902 which burned thousands of acres of forest.
