= Plymouth Cordage Company =

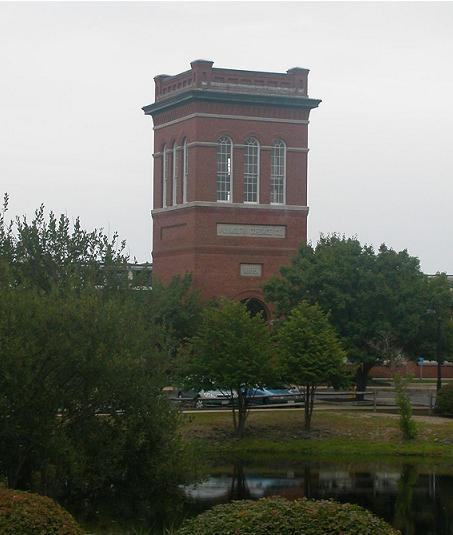
Cordage Company Tower

The Plymouth Cordage Company was a rope making company located in Plymouth, Massachusetts.

== History ==
The company, founded in 1824, had a large factory located on the Plymouth waterfront. By the late 19th century, the Plymouth Cordage Company had become the largest manufacturer of rope and twine in the world. The company specialized in ship rigging, and was chosen among other competitors in the early 1900s to manufacture the rope used on the USS Constitution.

In January 1916, the company was seeing increased business in their busiest season, preparing twine for both local harvest and foreign countries at war. When wages stayed stagnant despite rising costs of living, Cordage workers, despite not being unionized, spontaneously walked out in the company's first strike, halting company-wide production. Local anarchists from Boston traveled to support the strike, including Luigi Galleani and Bartolomeo Vanzetti, who formerly worked at the factory and later blamed his staunch participation in the strike for being blacklisted in the region. Historians contest that the strike had such an effect on workers. After a month-long closure, the factory offered a modest increase in wages below the strike demand, to which the workers accepted and returned.

Upton Sinclair's 1928 historical novel "Boston" has several chapters devoted to the company when his elderly heroine goes to work for the factory.

The company's twine, Plymouth binder twine, popular among farmers, was the inspiration for the naming of the Plymouth brand of automobiles first produced in 1928. In the 1910s, its mill was the world's largest of its kind.

Plymouth Cordage also operated a factory in Welland, Ontario. A detailed history of Welland operations can be found at the Welland Public Library Local History site.

The Plymouth Cordage Company served as the largest employer in Plymouth for over 100 years. It went out of business in 1964 after over 140 years of continuous operation. By the early-1960s, it had bought all the materials needed for production, had no debt and a lot of cash and was bought out by the Columbian Rope Company in 1965.

== Cordage Commerce Center ==
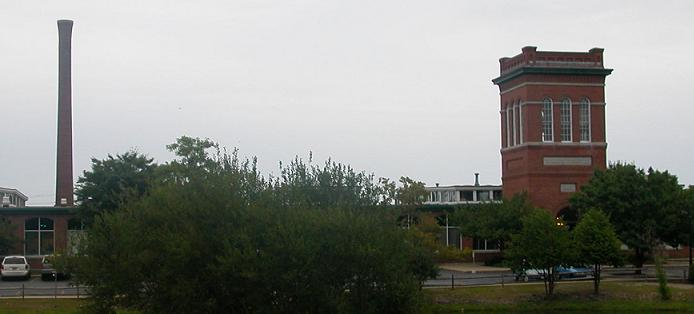
Wide view of the Cordage Factory, with the prominent smokestack to the left.

In modern times, the 45-acre (180,000 m^{2}) Cordage factory property in North Plymouth has been turned into a large retail and office center. The building, now known as Cordage Commerce Center. The factory also contains several restaurants, offices, and stores. University of Massachusetts Boston currently offers some classes in a wing of the building. The largest retailer is Mill Stores, which has now been closed. There was previously a Wal-Mart located on the property, but it closed in 2005 and relocated to Colony Place, also in Plymouth.

In 2012, much of the former plant was demolished due to deterioration related to the quick construction of the facility in 1899. Plans for the site include the eventual building of condominiums.

== Bibliography ==
- Avrich, Paul (1996). Sacco and Vanzetti: The Anarchist Background. Princeton University Press. ISBN 978-0-691-02604-6.
