= Hanover High School (Massachusetts) =

Coordinates: 42°7′50.2″N 70°52′12.1″W

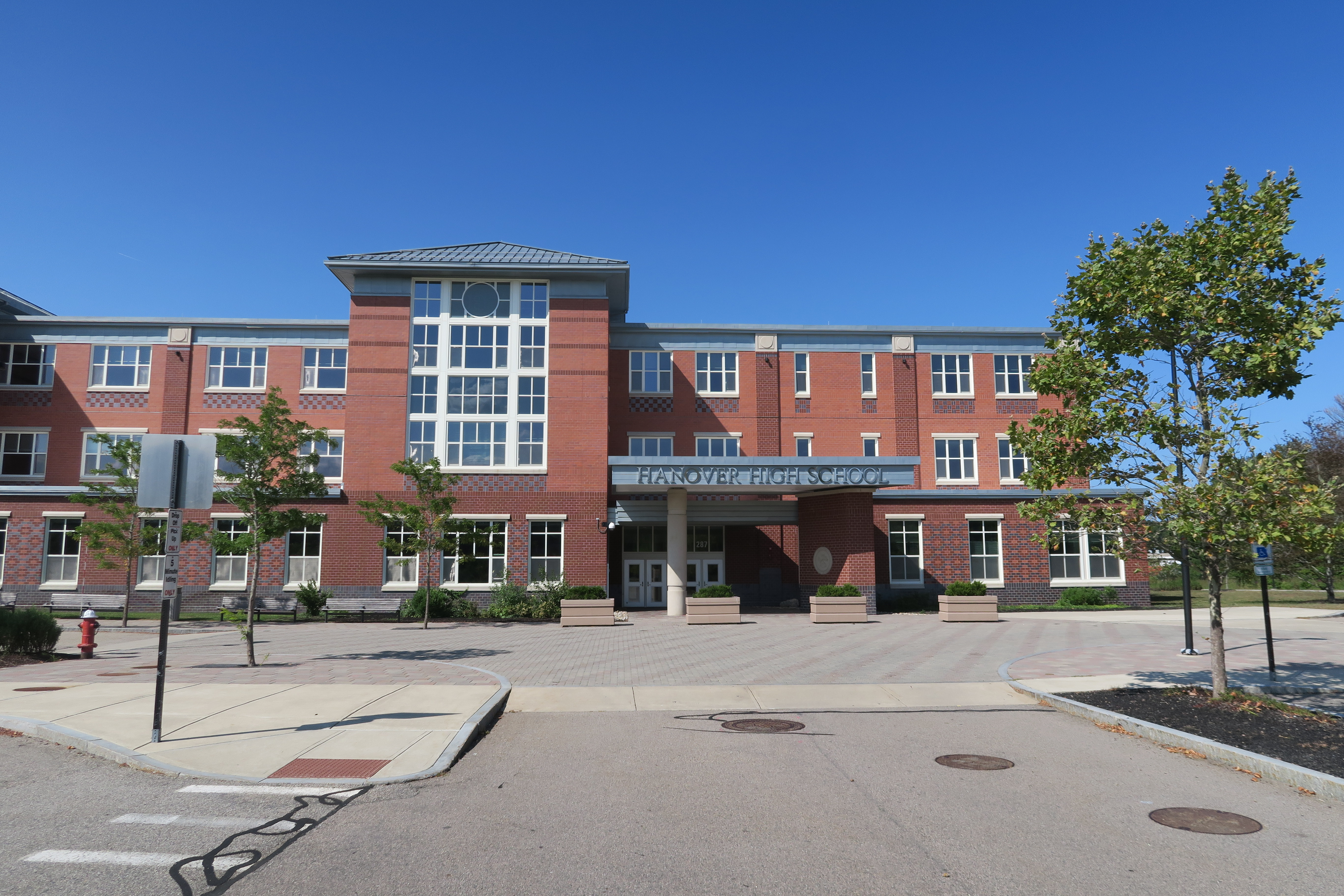
- Hanover High School

Location
- 287 Cedar St. Hanover, Plymouth County, Massachusetts 02339; United States

Information
- School type: Public High school
- Established: 1958
- Principal: Matthew Mattos
- Faculty: 59.20 (FTE)
- Grades: 9-12
- Enrollment: 684 (2023–2024)
- Student to teacher ratio: 11.27
- Language: English
- Colors: Blue and gold
- Athletics conference: Patriot League
- Mascot: Hawk
- Rival: Norwell, Scituate, Pembroke
- Communities served: Town of Hanover
- Website: http://www.hanoverschools.org/highschool/

Hanover High School is a public school located in Hanover, Massachusetts, United States. It encompasses grades 9 –12. Hanover High is a continuation for Hanover Middle School, and before that, either Center School or Cedar School. The original Hanover High School building was opened in 1958. The first graduating class was in 1959. Sylvester School formerly served as the high school.

The current Hanover High School building was opened in 2011.

Hanover's colors are blue and gold, and their mascot is the Hawks. Until 2021, HHS's mascot was the Indians, and was changed to the Hawks, thanks to a contest that won against 400 submissions. After another contest, the name "Sylvester" was chosen to be the name of the Hanover Hawk mascot. The name Sylvester goes back to Edmund Q. Sylvester, a prominent resident of Hanover during the latter half of the 1800s. The Sylvester family owned land around the old Hanover shipyards and had their own farm as well. The old elementary school in Hanover Center is named after him as well.

On December 3, 2016, Hanover's varsity football team beat Grafton 21-0 for the Division 3 Championship, ending the season undefeated.

Notable Alumni: Nichole Hiltz, actress (In Plain Sight, Bones)

David Griffin, Banana Ball baseball player (Indianapolis Clowns) class of 2014

Movies filmed at Hanover High School:

1. “The Sleepover,” Aug. 15. 2019 - released on Netflix in 2020
