= Middlesex Township, Pennsylvania =

Middlesex Township is the name of some places in the U.S. state of Pennsylvania:

- Middlesex Township, Butler County, Pennsylvania
- Middlesex Township, Cumberland County, Pennsylvania
