= Plymouth North High School =

Coordinates: 41°56′38.64″N 70°39′05.19″W

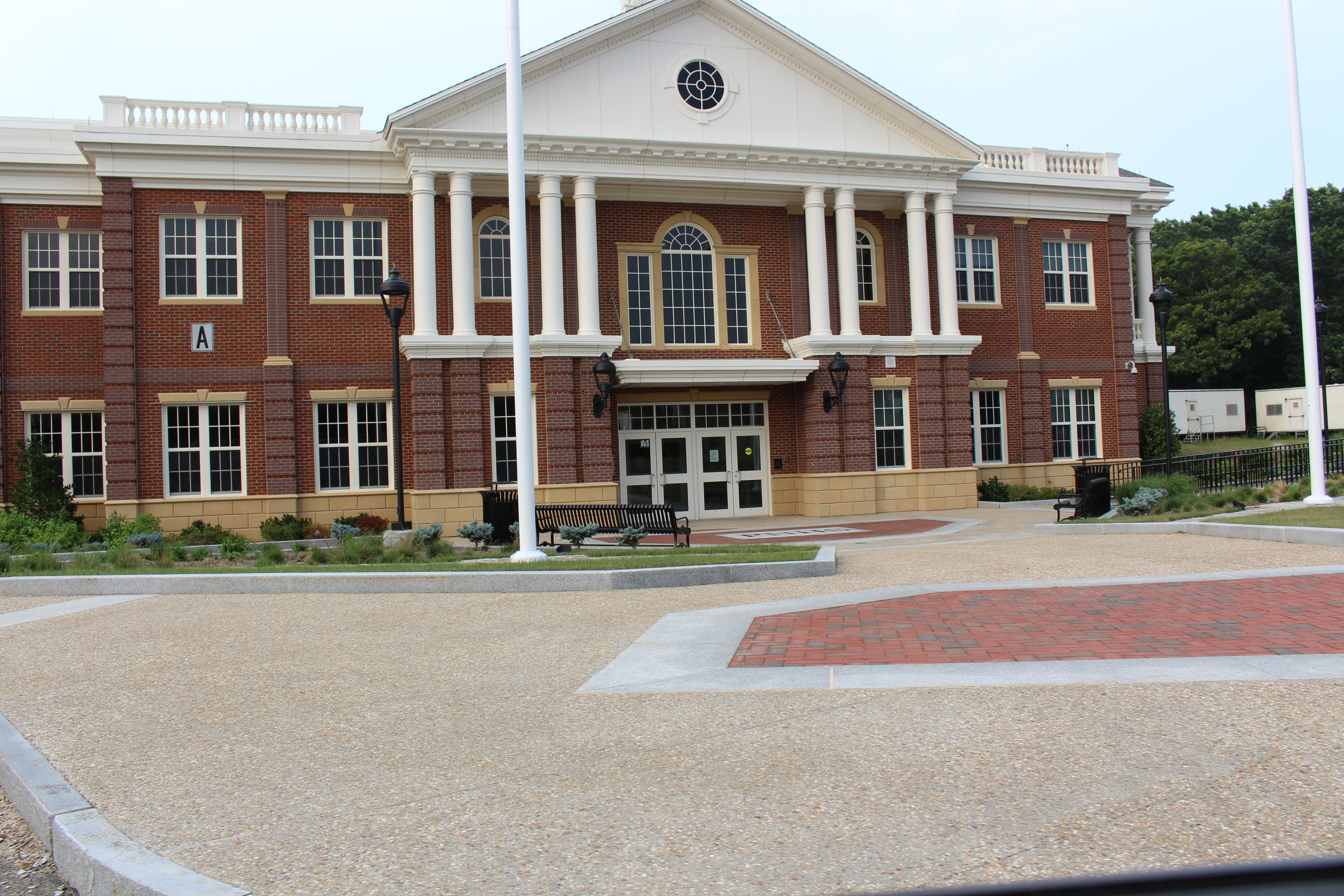

Location
- 41 Obery Street; Plymouth, Massachusetts 02360; United States

Information
- School type: Public High School
- Opened: 1963
- School district: Plymouth Public Schools
- Superintendent: Christopher S. Campbell
- Principal: Peter Parcellin
- Staff: 109.40 (FTE)
- Grades: 9–12
- Enrollment: 1,247 (2023–2024)
- Student to teacher ratio: 11.40
- Language: English
- Colors: Blue, White & Silver
- Slogan: "The Possibilities" in 2012,
- Sports: Baseball, lacrosse, softball, soccer, basketball, ice hockey, wrestling, football, field hockey, track, indoor track, winter track, cross country, tennis, golf, volleyball, cheer, fall cheer, winter cheer, dance, fall dance, winter dance, swim, gymnastics.
- Mascot: Eagle
- Nickname: Plymouth North Eagles
- Rivals: Plymouth South High School
- Budget: Yes
- Communities served: Town of Plymouth
- Construction Finished: 1963
- Renamed in: 1987
- Website: PNHS's homepage
- Last updated: 10/2/2021

Plymouth North High School, formerly known as Plymouth-Carver Regional High School, and known informally as Plymouth North or PNHS, is a public high school located in Plymouth, Massachusetts, United States. Its students are residents of the town of Plymouth.

The school is one of three high schools in Plymouth, the others being Plymouth South High School and Rising Tide Charter Public School. Plymouth North is located south of Plymouth Center, and is located adjacent to the Plymouth County Courthouse, the Plymouth County Registry of Deeds, and Beth Israel Deaconess Hospital – Plymouth. In 2012, the district opened a new school which cost around $83,000,000. The school colors are Blue, White & Silver and the school mascot is an Eagle. Plymouth North opened under the name Plymouth High School, but changed its name to Plymouth-Carver Regional High School when Carver joined the district in 1963. With the opening of Carver High School in 1987, it was renamed Plymouth North High School. It serves over 1300 students in grades 9-12 from the North, West, and Central neighborhoods of Plymouth. Plymouth North features a full range of academic courses as well as state-of-the-art vocational technical programs in Marketing, Allied Health, Engineering, and Facilities Management. Plymouth North High School is accredited by the New England Association of Schools and Colleges.

The school has a section of the school designed for special education students. In June 2021, Plymouth North High School was placed (along with the entire Plymouth Public Schools district) into a state program for schools or districts that disproportionately suspend nonwhite students or students with disabilities.

== Awards ==
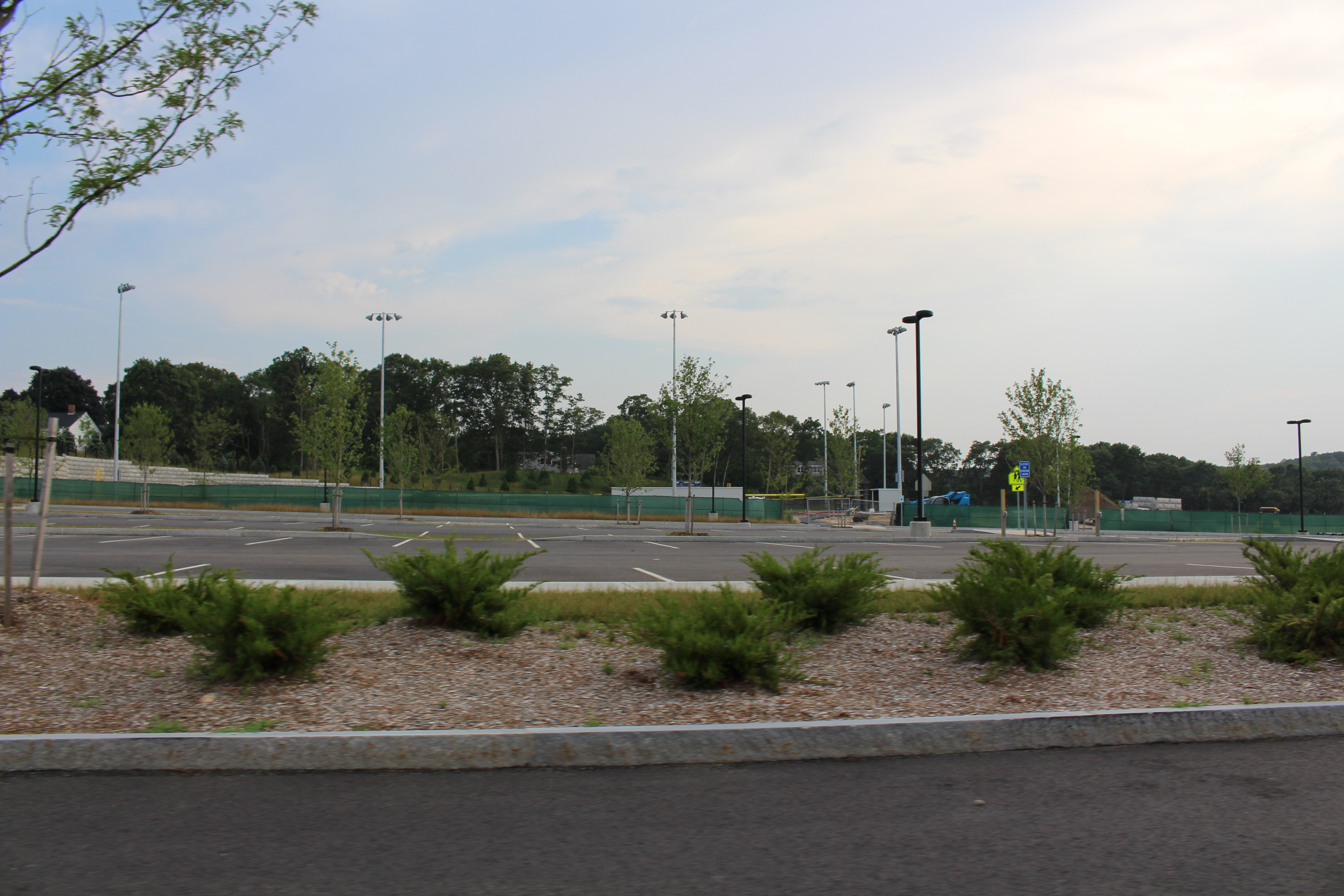
Unfinished athletic fields, the location former Plymouth North High School

On April 27, 2007, Plymouth North High School was presented with an environmental award at the Massachusetts State House. The Commonwealth of Massachusetts Executive Office of Energy and Environmental Affairs presented the award at their 13th Annual Awards for Excellence in Environmental Education in recognition of Plymouth North's Life Skills program and its recycling efforts.

- Girls Indoor Track State Champions – 2016
- Football State Champions – 1984, 1989
- Football State Finalists – 1975, 1993
- In 2011 the Plymouth North Eagles won their 2nd state baseball title in 4 years with a 3–1 win over Hudson
- In 2014 the Plymouth North Boys Tennis Team won their second consecutive A.C.L Title, they also made it to the Semis of States.
- In the 2013–2014 season, Plymouth North Dance Team placed first at the competition for the first time in history. They took home first place and grand champions overall at a UDA competition including teams from high schools and colleges around Massachusetts.
