= The Pinehills, Massachusetts =

Community in Massachusetts, US

- Census-designated place
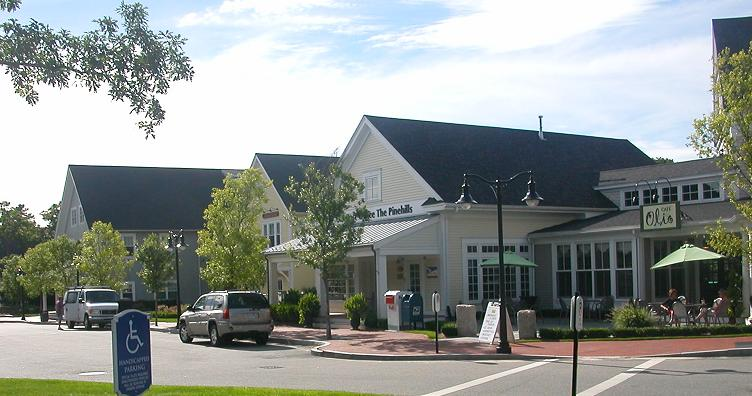
- The Village Green of The Pinehills

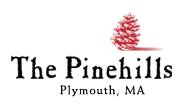

- Location in Plymouth County in Massachusetts
- Coordinates: 41°53′18″N 70°36′00″W
- Country: United States
- State: Massachusetts
- County: Plymouth

Area
  - Total: 4.12 sq mi (10.66 km^{2})
  - Land: 4.08 sq mi (10.57 km^{2})
  - Water: 0.039 sq mi (0.10 km^{2})

Population (2020)
  - Total: 4,515
  - Density: 1,106.8/sq mi (427.32/km^{2})
- Time zone: UTC-5 (Eastern (EST))
  - Summer (DST): UTC-4 (EDT)
- Zip code: 02360
- Area code: 508
- FIPS code: 25-69585
- GNIS feature ID: 2583712
- Website: www.pinehills.com

The Pinehills is a census-designated place (CDP) located in the Pine Hills region of Plymouth, Massachusetts, United States. At the 2020 census, the population was 4,515. It includes a real estate development that bears the same name. As of 2008, the project is the largest new residential and commercial development in New England.

== Geography ==
According to the United States Census Bureau, the CDP has a total area of 1.1 mi² (2.9 km^{2}), all land.

== Demographics ==
Historical population
Census	Pop.	Note	%±
2020	4,515		—
U.S. Decennial Census

=== 2020 census ===
As of the 2020 census, The Pinehills had a population of 4,515. The median age was 69.1 years. 3.6% of residents were under the age of 18 and 63.7% of residents were 65 years of age or older. For every 100 females there were 80.1 males, and for every 100 females age 18 and over there were 79.9 males age 18 and over.

99.7% of residents lived in urban areas, while 0.3% lived in rural areas.

There were 2,466 households in The Pinehills, of which 9.6% had children under the age of 18 living in them. Of all households, 62.9% were married-couple households, 8.8% were households with a male householder and no spouse or partner present, and 24.7% were households with a female householder and no spouse or partner present. About 25.0% of all households were made up of individuals and 18.0% had someone living alone who was 65 years of age or older.

There were 2,763 housing units, of which 10.7% were vacant. The homeowner vacancy rate was 1.5% and the rental vacancy rate was 10.8%.

Racial composition as of the 2020 census
Race	Number	Percent
White	4,288	95.0%
Black or African American	27	0.6%
American Indian and Alaska Native	5	0.1%
Asian	68	1.5%
Native Hawaiian and Other Pacific Islander	0	0.0%
Some other race	35	0.8%
Two or more races	92	2.0%
Hispanic or Latino (of any race)	77	1.7%

== Overview ==
When complete, The Pinehills, a mixed-use community, will include 1.3 million square feet of mixed-use space and 3,065 homes on only 30 percent of the land, preserving over 2,200 acres of open space over an area of 3,060 acres (12.4 km^{2}), an area larger than many Massachusetts towns. Already, over 500,000 square feet of mixed-use space exists in the Village Green. The community now consists of over 2,000 single-family homes, apartments and condominiums, two daily fee public golf courses, a private golf club, and the Village Green, a commercial center with a grocery store, restaurants, US Post Office, shops and professional and medical services.

Homes in The Pinehills are organized into nearly 40 neighborhoods. Neighborhoods have different builders and home styles: from cottage homes to custom homes to condominium townhomes to luxury apartment rentals. Homes are designed by eleven different builders, including Polhemus Savery DaSilva Architects Builders, The Green Company, Kistler and Knapp, Design Housing, Pulte Homes, Whitman Homes, MacKenzie Brothers, Toll Brothers, Barefoot Cottage Company, The Hanover Company, and AvalonBay Communities, Inc.

The Pinehills is also home to Mirbeau Inn & Spa. This is the second Mirbeau in the U.S., with the first in the Finger Lakes region of New York State. Mirbeau is known for its spa treatments and beautiful architecture and design. Surrounding the Inn are Monet-inspired pond gardens.

Eighty residences offering assisted living and memory care for seniors are part of Laurelwood at The Pinehills.

== The Village Green ==
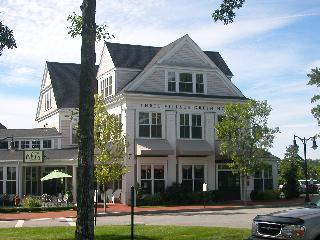
The largest building of the Village Green, which contains medical offices and a restaurant

The Village Green is the commercial center of the Pinehills. It consists of Mirbeau Inn & Spa, The Market at The Pinehills, several shops including a salon, a restaurant, a post office, a wine and spirits shop, several medical service centers, offices, and bank branch office. A gas station opened in the spring of 2012. A fire station is also located within The Pinehills.

== Golf courses ==
The Pinehills is home to Pinehills Golf Club which contains two public, daily-fee 18-hole golf courses situated among the residential neighborhoods. The courses are titled the "Nicklaus Course" and the "Rees Jones Course", and both are consistently ranked among the top golf courses in the United States. The community also contains a private club, Old Sandwich Golf Club, featuring a golf course designed by Bill Coore and Ben Crenshaw.

== See also ==
- Neighborhoods in Plymouth, Massachusetts
- Colony Place
- The Shops at 5
