= South Plymouth, Massachusetts =

Neighborhood in Plymouth, Massachusetts

Coordinates: 41.87°N 70.57°W

South Plymouth in 1923

South Plymouth is the portion of Plymouth, Massachusetts, United States that covers much of the southern section of the town, beginning at Manomet and the Pine Hills. It is east of the Myles Standish State Forest, and stretching south to the Bourne and Wareham town lines.

Villages and neighborhoods in South Plymouth are:

- Rocky Point
- The Pinehills
- Manomet
  - Priscilla Beach
  - White Horse Beach
  - Manomet Heights
  - Manomet Bluffs
  - Fishermans Landing
  - Churchill Landing
  - Colony Beach
  - Pilgrim Beach
  - Cedar Bushes
  - Manomet Beach
- Vallerville
  - Ocean Aire Beach
  - Surfside Beach
  - Bayside Beach
- Ellisville
  - Harlow's Landing
  - Eastland Heights
- Cedarville
  - Nameloc Heights
  - Pondville
- Halfway Pond
- Long Pond
- West Wind Shores
- White Island Shores

== See also ==
- Neighborhoods in Plymouth, Massachusetts
