= Micajah Heights, Massachusetts =

Neighborhood in Plymouth, Massachusetts, US

Coordinates: 41°55′10″N 70°41′46″W

Micajah Heights is a neighborhood in Plymouth, Massachusetts, United States, located in the West Plymouth section of the town, southwest of Billington Sea. The neighborhood surrounds Micajah Pond.

== See also ==
- Neighborhoods in Plymouth, Massachusetts
