= Plymouth South High School =

Coordinates: 41.8827°N 70.6166°W

Location
- 490 Long Pond Rd; Plymouth, Massachusetts; United States

Information
- Type: Public Secondary
- Established: 1988 (Old Plymouth South) 2017 (New Plymouth South)
- School district: Plymouth Public Schools
- Principal: Patricia Fry
- Teaching staff: 98.97 (on an FTE basis)
- Grades: 9–12
- Enrollment: 1,001 (2024–2025)
- Student to teacher ratio: 10.11
- Campus: Suburban
- Colors: Black and Teal
- Athletics conference: MIAA - Division 2
- Team name: Panthers
- Rival: Plymouth North
- Website: Official website

Plymouth South High School, also known as Plymouth South, or PSHS, is a public high school located in Plymouth, Massachusetts, United States. Its students are residents of the town of Plymouth. Plymouth South is one of two high schools in Plymouth, the other being Plymouth North High School.

Plymouth South is located near the Long Pond neighborhood of Plymouth, west of Route 3 and The Pinehills development, and also adjacent to nearby Myles Standish State Forest, which is the biggest publicly owned recreation area in the South Shore region of Massachusetts, and also one of the biggest in the state. The school colors are Black, Teal and White and the school's teams are the Panthers.

== History ==
Plymouth South High School was opened in 1988, the same year the Plymouth-Carver School District was dissolved into the separate Carver and Plymouth school districts. Plymouth-Carver High School became Plymouth North High School after the district separation of Plymouth and Carver. Prior to its opening, Plymouth North High School (then known as Plymouth-Carver High School) had served as the sole high school for the towns of Plymouth and Carver. In the fall of 2017, a new building for the high school built behind the existing school opened replacing the old Plymouth South which was demolished in the Summer of 2017. In June 2021, Plymouth South High School was placed (along with the entire Plymouth Public Schools district) into a state program for schools or districts that disproportionately suspend nonwhite students or students with disabilities.

== Athletics ==
Plymouth South offers a wide range of interscholastic sports at the school for all the students. The school teams are the Panthers, and their school colors are Black, White & Teal. Plymouth South competes at the Division 1 & 2 level of competition in athletics and is a part of the Patriot League.

In 2018, the boys hockey team won their first state championship with a 4-3 victory over Stoneham High School.

=== Sports offered ===
- Fall
  - Cross Country
  - Field Hockey
  - Football
  - Golf
  - Boys Soccer
  - Girls Soccer
  - Volleyball
  - Cheerleading
  - Dance Team
- Winter
  - Boys Basketball
  - Girls Basketball
  - Cheerleading
  - Gymnastics
  - Ice Hockey
  - Boys Swimming
  - Girls Swimming
  - Indoor Track & Field
  - Wrestling
  - Dance Team
- Spring
  - Baseball
  - Softball
  - Boys Lacrosse
  - Girls Lacrosse
  - Boys Tennis
  - Girls Tennis
  - Outdoor Track & Field

== See also ==
- List of high schools in Massachusetts
