= Micajah Pond (Massachusetts) =

Lake of the United States of America

- Location within Massachusetts Location within the United States
- Location: Plymouth, Massachusetts
- Coordinates: 41°55′13″N 70°41′54″W
- Type: Pond
- Basin countries: United States
- Surface area: 20 acres (8.1 ha)
- Max. depth: 26 ft (7.9 m)
- Settlements: Micajah Heights

Micajah Pond is a 20-acre (81,000 m^{2}) pond located in Plymouth, Massachusetts. The Micajah Heights neighborhood surrounds the southeastern portion of the pond and Little Micajah Pond. The maximum depth is 26 feet (7.9 m). Shenandoah Estates borders the northern portion of the pond known as the lily pond and wraps around the pond bordered by Goldfinch Lane. Boat access is on the southeastern shore of the pond.
