= North Plymouth, Massachusetts =

- neighborhood
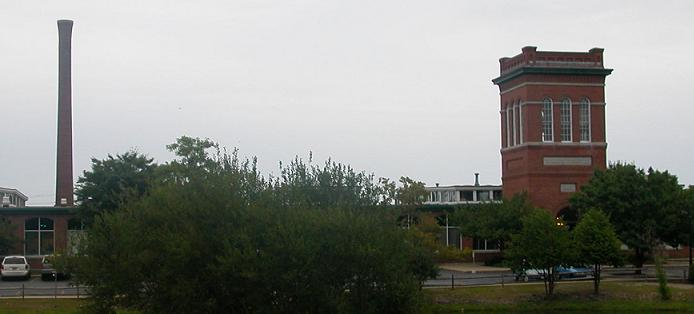
- Factory of the Plymouth Cordage Company, now the Cordage Park commercial complex

- Location in Plymouth County in Massachusetts
- Coordinates: 41°58′17″N 70°41′13″W
- Country: United States
- State: Massachusetts
- County: Plymouth
- Town: Plymouth

Area
  - Total: 3.47 sq mi (9.00 km^{2})
  - Land: 1.25 sq mi (3.23 km^{2})
  - Water: 2.23 sq mi (5.77 km^{2})
- Elevation: 82 ft (25 m)

Population (2020)
  - Total: 3,983
  - Density: 3,196.7/sq mi (1,234.24/km^{2})
- Time zone: UTC-5 (Eastern (EST))
  - Summer (DST): UTC-4 (EDT)
- ZIP Codes: 02360 (Plymouth); 02362 (P.O. box holders only)
- Area code: 508/774
- FIPS code: 25-48780
- GNIS feature ID: 0615267

North Plymouth is a census-designated place (CDP) in the town of Plymouth in Plymouth County, Massachusetts, United States. As of the 2020 census, North Plymouth had a population of 3,983. It is best known as the location of Cordage Park, a small village where the Plymouth Cordage Company was once headquartered. The village is now home to Cordage Commerce Center, a large retail development that consists of offices and stores.

== Geography ==
North Plymouth is located at 41°58′17″N 70°41′13″W (41.971285, -70.686980).

According to the United States Census Bureau, the CDP has a total area of 9.1 km^{2} (3.5 mi^{2}), of which 3.3 km^{2} (1.3 mi^{2}) is land and 5.8 km^{2} (2.2 mi^{2}) (63.71%) is water.

== Demographics ==
Historical population
Census	Pop.	Note	%±
2020	3,983		—
U.S. Decennial Census

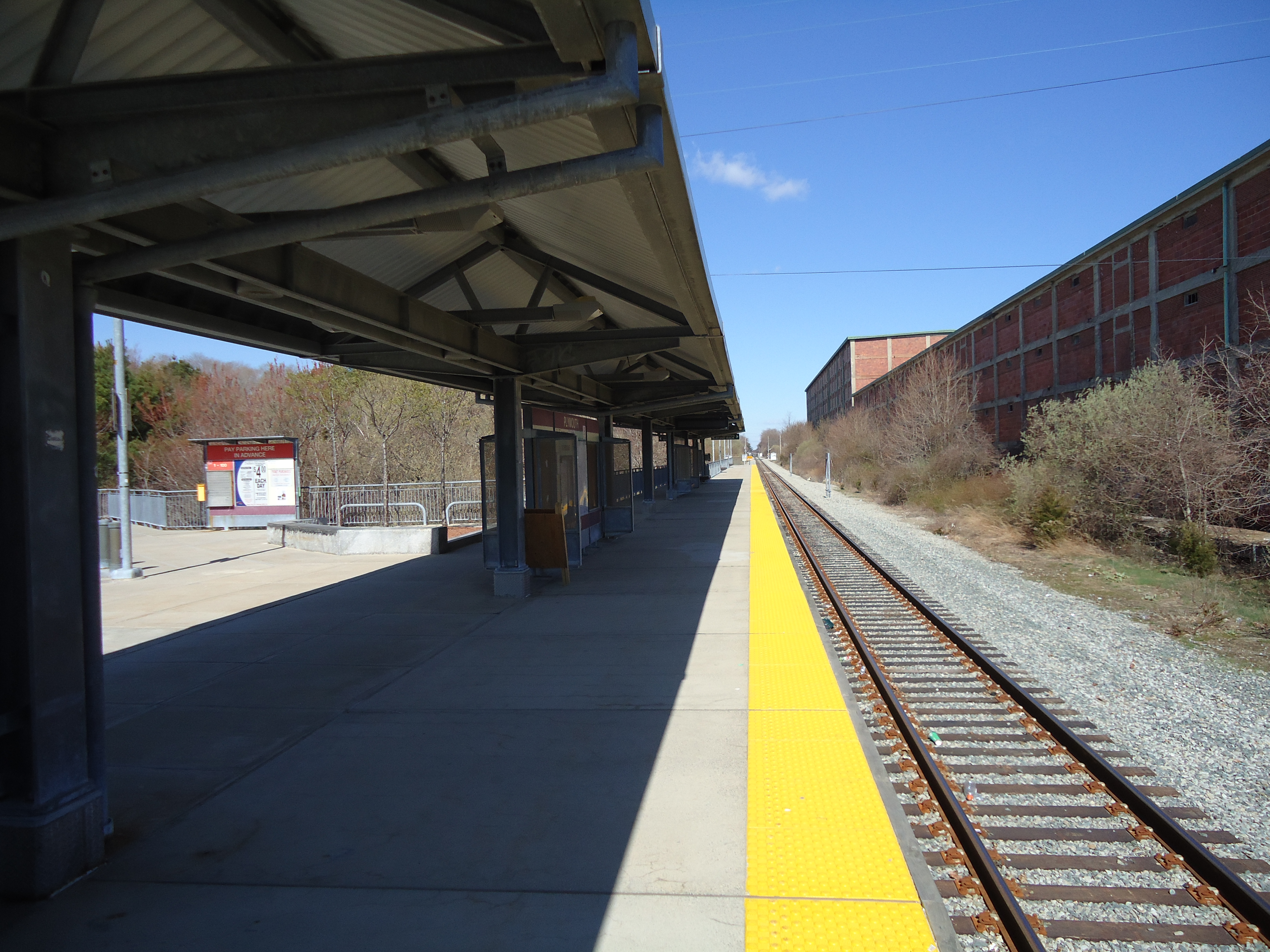
The Plymouth MBTA station in North Plymouth

=== 2020 census ===
As of the 2020 census, North Plymouth had a population of 3,983. The median age was 40.6 years. 18.8% of residents were under the age of 18 and 17.0% of residents were 65 years of age or older. For every 100 females there were 93.6 males, and for every 100 females age 18 and over there were 89.3 males age 18 and over.

100.0% of residents lived in urban areas, while 0.0% lived in rural areas.

There were 1,734 households in North Plymouth, of which 23.9% had children under the age of 18 living in them. Of all households, 34.0% were married-couple households, 20.1% were households with a male householder and no spouse or partner present, and 36.1% were households with a female householder and no spouse or partner present. About 34.9% of all households were made up of individuals and 15.4% had someone living alone who was 65 years of age or older.

There were 1,815 housing units, of which 4.5% were vacant. The homeowner vacancy rate was 0.1% and the rental vacancy rate was 3.5%.

Racial composition as of the 2020 census
Race	Number	Percent
White	3,183	79.9%
Black or African American	98	2.5%
American Indian and Alaska Native	16	0.4%
Asian	37	0.9%
Native Hawaiian and Other Pacific Islander	0	0.0%
Some other race	207	5.2%
Two or more races	442	11.1%
Hispanic or Latino (of any race)	140	3.5%

=== 2000 census ===
As of the census of 2000, there were 3,593 people, 1,506 households, and 884 families residing in the CDP. The population density was 1,092.3/km^{2} (2,832.7/mi^{2}). There were 1,580 housing units at an average density of 480.3/km^{2} (1,245.7/mi^{2}). The racial makeup of the CDP was 93.46% White, 1.95% African American, 0.28% Native American, 0.58% Asian, 1.03% from other races, and 2.70% from two or more races. Hispanic or Latino of any race were 1.00% of the population.

There were 1,506 households, out of which 28.8% had children under the age of 18 living with them, 38.2% were married couples living together, 16.3% had a female householder with no husband present, and 41.3% were non-families. 33.7% of all households were made up of individuals, and 18.2% had someone living alone who was 65 years of age or older. The average household size was 2.36 and the average family size was 3.05.

In the CDP, the population was spread out, with 24.5% under the age of 18, 7.6% from 18 to 24, 30.8% from 25 to 44, 19.4% from 45 to 64, and 17.7% who were 65 years of age or older. The median age was 37 years. For every 100 females, there were 87.3 males. For every 100 females age 18 and over, there were 82.6 males.

The median income for a household in the CDP was $35,561, and the median income for a family was $38,380. Males had a median income of $35,372 versus $26,920 for females. The per capita income for the CDP was $17,508. About 11.2% of families and 14.4% of the population were below the poverty line, including 19.3% of those under age 18 and 15.5% of those age 65 or over.

== See also ==
- Neighborhoods in Plymouth, Massachusetts
