= West Plymouth, Massachusetts =

Village in Massachusetts, United States

Coordinates: 41.93°N 70.71°W

West Plymouth is a village in Plymouth, Plymouth County, Massachusetts, United States. It is located beyond the Colony Place retail development and the Plymouth Industrial Park off U.S. Route 44 and north of Myles Standish State Forest. It stretches west to the Carver town line and north to the Kingston town line. The villages within this section include Micajah Heights, a community surrounding Micajah Pond, Billington Sea, a village along the southern shore of the pond, Darby, a village surrounding Darby Pond, and the portion of East Carver that extends into Plymouth.

Some neighborhoods include Algonquin Heights, Summer Hill and Micajah Heights.

Parting Ways Cemetery, a 94-acre (380,000 m^{2}) site containing the burial grounds of four former slaves who fought in the Revolutionary War and their families, is located on Route 80 in this section of Plymouth.

== See also ==
- Neighborhoods in Plymouth, Massachusetts
