= Five Mile Pond =

Pond in Massachusetts, United States

- Location within Massachusetts
- Location: Plymouth, Massachusetts
- Coordinates: 41°48′43″N 70°39′11″W
- Basin countries: United States
- Surface area: 21.79 acres (8.82 ha)
- Max. depth: 21 ft (6.4 m)

Five Mile Pond is a 21.79-acre (88,200 m^{2}) pond in Plymouth, Massachusetts, located northeast of Little Long Pond, southeast of Abner Pond, southwest of Fawn Pond, east of Charge Pond and east of Southeast Line Road, a fire road that marks the southeastern boundary of Myles Standish State Forest. The maximum depth of the pond is 21 feet (6.4 m). Access to the pond is via Fearing Pond, but it is not open to the public. Instead, it is used by Camp Cachalot, whose right-of-way to the pond is on its eastern shore.
