= White Island =

White Island may refer to:

== Places ==
=== Oceania ===
- Whakaari / White Island, volcanic island in the Bay of Plenty, New Zealand
  - 2019 Whakaari / White Island eruption
- White Island (Otago), Dunedin, New Zealand

=== North America ===
- White's Island in Paget, Bermuda, also known as White Island
- Qikiqtaaluk (Foxe Basin), formerly White Island, Nunavut, Canada
- White Island in Newfoundland, Canada, one of the Wadham Islands
- Mau Mau Island, also known as White Island, in the US state of New York
- Isles of Shoals, also known as White and Seavey Islands, in the US state of New Hampshire
  - White Island State Historic Site
- White Island Pond, Massachusetts, U.S.
- White Island Shores, Massachusetts, U.S.

=== Europe ===
- White Island, Isles of Scilly, England
- Eilean Bàn (White Island), Scotland
- White Island, County Fermanagh, Northern Ireland
- White Island, Ibiza
- Beloostrov (White Island), St. Petersburg, Russia
- Graciosa, or White Island, Azores
- Kvitøya (White Island), Norway
- Snake Island (Ukraine) (White Island)

=== Asia ===
- White Island (Philippines)

=== Antarctica ===
- White Island (Enderby Land)
- White Island (Ross Archipelago)
- White Islands, Sulzberger Bay

== Other uses ==
- White Island (film), 2016

== See also ==
- Isla Blanca (disambiguation)
- Isle of Wight (disambiguation)
- White's Island
