= Spectacle Pond =

Spectacle Pond may refer to:

- Spectacle Pond (Sandwich, Massachusetts)
- Spectacle Pond (Wareham, Massachusetts)
