= Little Long Pond =

Little Long Pond may refer to:

- Little Long Pond (Plymouth, Massachusetts)
- Little Long Pond (Wareham, Massachusetts)
