= Massachusetts Route 25 =

Highway in Massachusetts

Route 25
- Blue Star Memorial Highway
- Route 25 highlighted in red

Route information
- Maintained by MassDOT
- Length: 10.006 mi (16.103 km)
- Existed: 1957–present

Major junctions
- West end: I-195 / I-495 in Wareham
- US 6 / Route 28 in Wareham
- East end: US 6 / Route 28 in Bourne

Location
- Country: United States
- State: Massachusetts
- Counties: Plymouth, Barnstable

Highway system
- Massachusetts State Highway System; Interstate; US; State
← Route 24	→ Route 27

Route 25 is a 10-mile-long (16 km) freeway located in Plymouth County and Barnstable County, Massachusetts, United States. The route is a nominally east–west highway, and less commonly known as the Blue Star Memorial Highway. A southward continuation of Interstate 495, Route 25 provides freeway access to Cape Cod. The route's western terminus is at a trumpet interchange with I-495 and I-195 in West Wareham. The route has three numbered interchanges along its length before terminating at the northern end of the Bourne Bridge in Bourne; the mainline of Route 25 continues across the bridge and over the Cape Cod Canal as Massachusetts Route 28 south.

Prior to 1982, the Route 25 designation was given to that segment of what is now I-495 from Route 24 in Raynham to the interchange with I-195 in Wareham. Upon completion of the I-495 segment between Route 24 and I-95, that portion of the existing freeway was redesignated as I-495 in various stages during the 1970s and 1980s, eventually reducing Route 25 to a 2.5-mile (4 km) segment that continued eastward from I-495 to the modern location of Exit 3 in Downtown Wareham. Construction of an eastern continuation of Route 25 to the Bourne Bridge was delayed for nearly three decades due to property disputes and environmental concerns, but the final 7.5-mile (12 km) segment opened in 1987. The freeway was originally planned to continue over the Bourne Bridge into Cape Cod as part of a planned "Southside Connector", but this plan was abandoned by the Massachusetts Highway Department (MassHighway) in the late 1970s.

== Route description ==
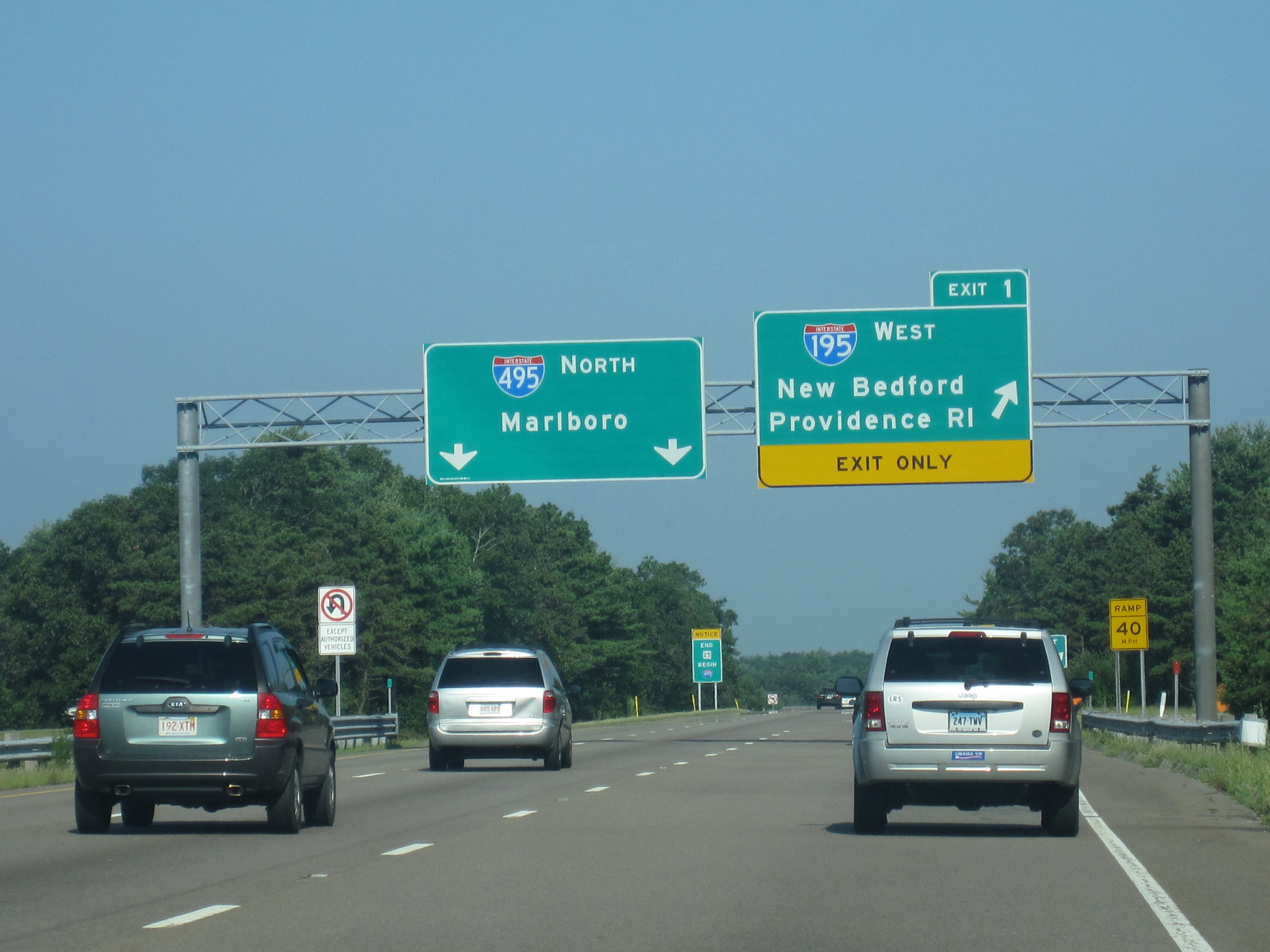
Route 25 westbound at Exit 1 in Wareham, approaching its western terminus. I-495 begins just ahead where the freeway crosses underneath I-195.

Route 25 begins at a trumpet interchange with I-495 and I-195 in West Wareham, Massachusetts; the two left lanes of Route 25 west mainline onto I-495 north, with the right-hand lane serving I-195 via Exit 1. From I-195, Route 25 east is accessible via Exit 40A; I-195 terminates at the interchange. Interstate 495 also terminates at its junction with Route 25; the two southbound lanes of I-495 default onto Route 25 east. After the interchange with I-195 and I-495, Route 25 begins to head in a southeastern direction towards Wareham as a six-lane freeway. The route passes under Tihonet Road and through Maple Swamp, located at the northern end of Parker Mills Pond.

After the Tihonet Road overpass, the route continues on a southeastern projection, passing close to several farms and cranberry bogs in Wareham. After passing under Charge Pond Road, Route 25 enters the hamlet of East Wareham with an alignment parallel to Route 28 (Cranberry Highway). Eastbound Route 25 has its first interchange with Maple Springs Road, a local road that connects to US 6 and Route 28 and is used to access East Wareham and Onset. Shortly after the interchange, numbered as Exit 3 (formerly Exit 1), Route 25 proceeds across Agawam Mill Pond via a short causeway. Exit 3 off Route 25 west is located to the east of Agawam Mill Pond and connects to US 6 and Route 28 via Glen Charlie Road, an unnumbered route that also serves the village of White Island Shores.

After Exit 3, Route 25 bends to the northeast, bypassing Buttermilk Bay and the densely populated village of Buzzards Bay to the south. The route passes Union Pond and Dicks Pond to the south and Spectacle Pond and Sandy Pond to the north and passing several cranberry bogs and small ponds to the south. It then continues towards a rest area, which is accessible from the eastbound side of the highway. Due to state funding cutbacks, services at the rest area are limited to summer weekends (Friday to Sunday) as of 2010. After the rest area, Route 25 passes over Bourne Road and turns sharply to head in a southwestern direction, heading toward the village of Buzzards Bay. Route 25 has its final interchange in Buzzards Bay; Exit 10 (formerly Exit 2), which serves the villages of Buzzards Bay and Sagamore, connecting to US 6 (Scenic Highway) and Route 28 north. From Exit 3, US 6 is used to access the Sagamore Bridge in Sagamore and the towns of Hyannis and Provincetown on Cape Cod.

After Exit 3, the Route 25 designation continues for 0.6 miles (1 km). The six-lane divided freeway becomes a four-lane undivided freeway shortly before the approach ramps to the Bourne Bridge. Route 25 is concurrent with Route 28 from Exit 3 until the US 6 underpass, at which point the Route 25 designation officially ends; the two eastbound lanes of Route 25 continue as Route 28 south over the Bourne Bridge and the Cape Cod Canal and onto Cape Cod. Route 28 continues southward to the town of Falmouth and then eastward to Hyannis and Orleans. An estimated daily average of over 35,000 motorists utilized the Route 25 expressway in 2008.

== History ==
=== Early alignment ===
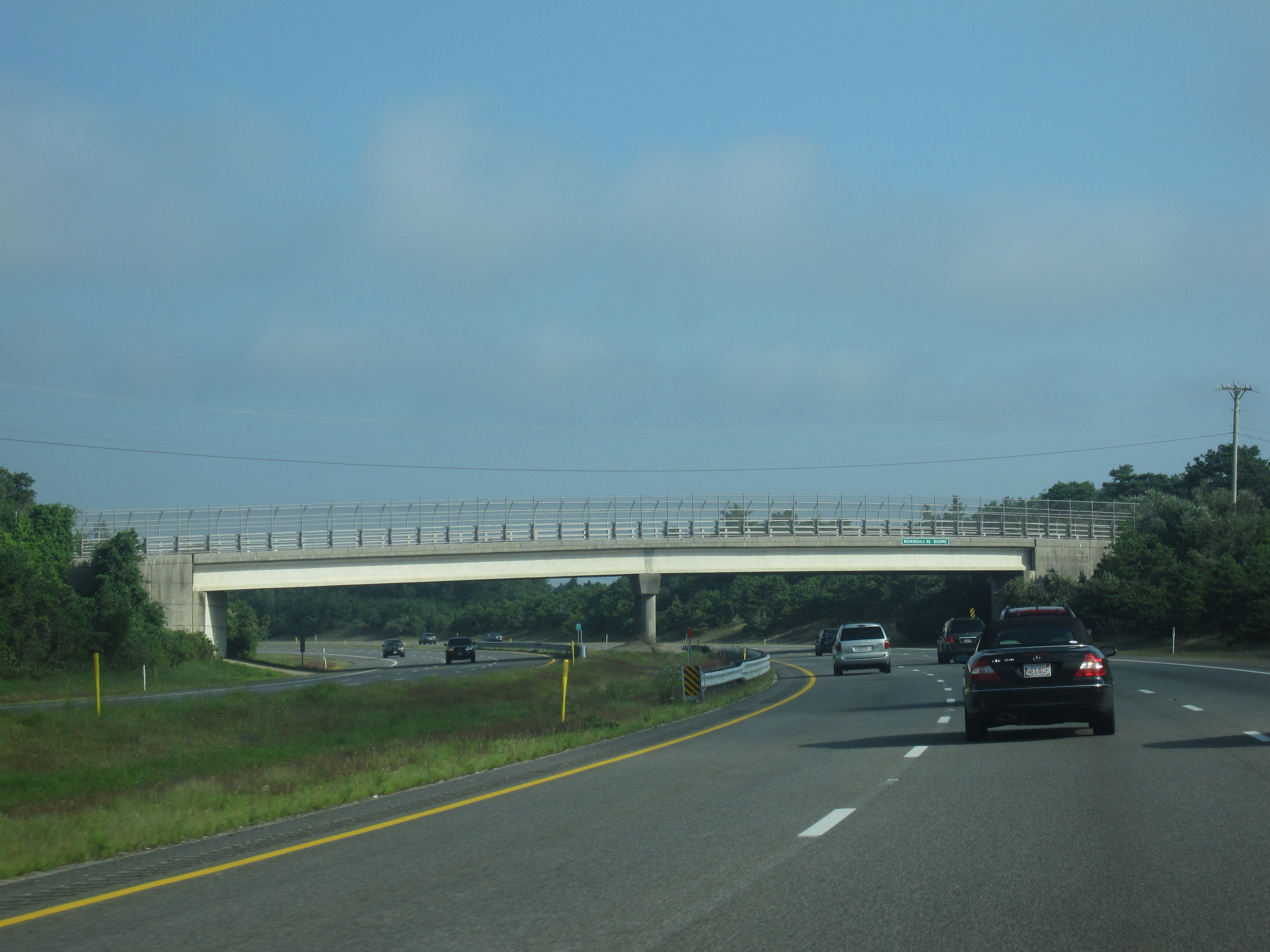
Route 25 westbound at the Bournedale Road overpass

The origins of Route 25 date back to 1947, when the Massachusetts Department of Public Works (MassDPW) announced plans for an expressway that would link I-95 in Foxborough with Cape Cod. The planned route was given the Route 25 designation northwest of a planned interchange with the Fall River Expressway (Route 24) in Raynham and the Route 28 designation to the southeast of Route 24. After ten years of planning studies, the route received preliminary approval from the MassDPW in 1957, and construction began in 1958; the entire route was designated as Route 25 in 1962, with Route 28 instead being aligned on local roads. The portion of the freeway between Route 24 in Raynham and I-195 in Wareham was completed in 1967. In 1969, MassDPW extended the freeway eastward to US 6 in Wareham.

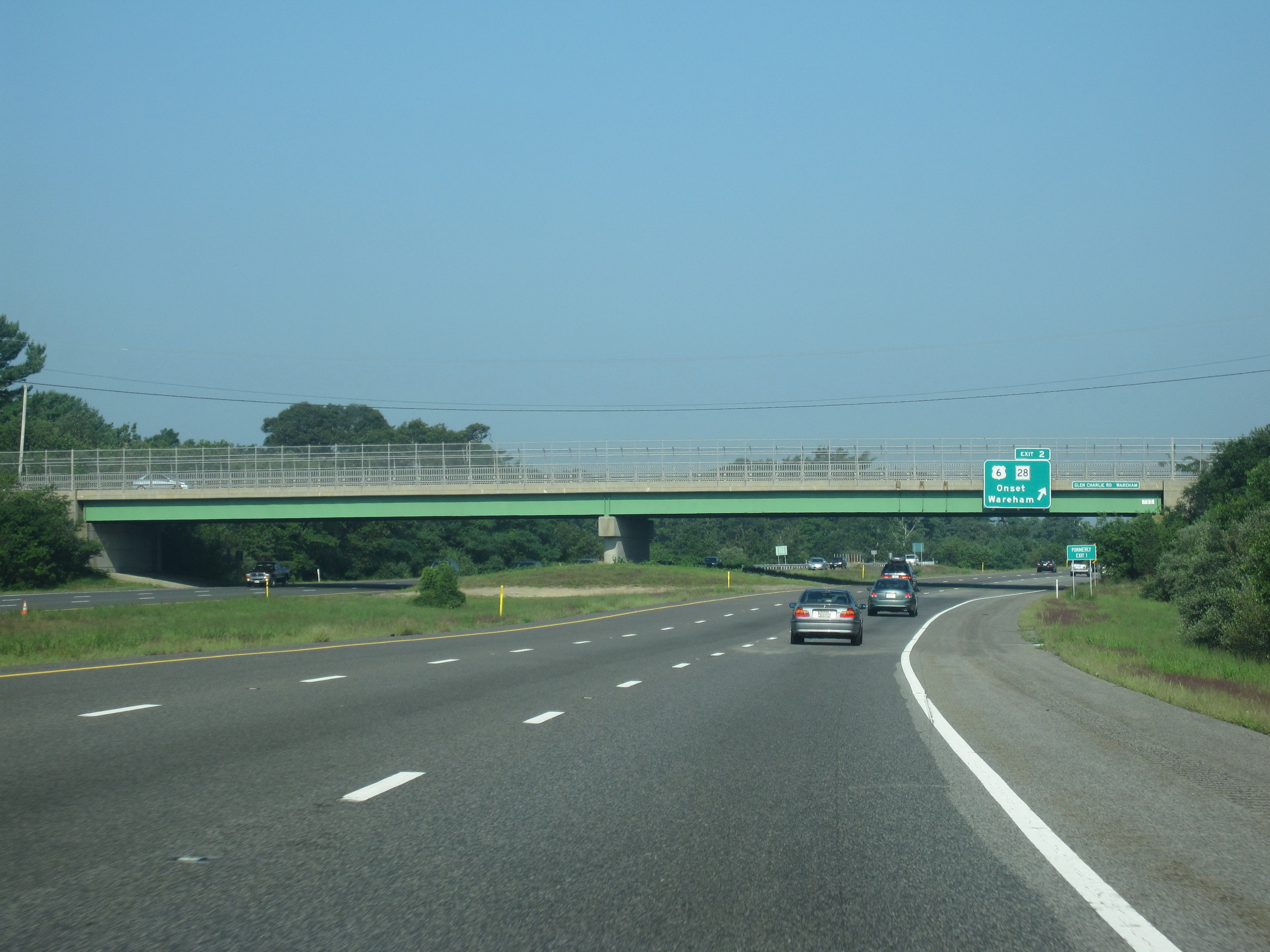
Route 25 westbound at Exit 3 (old Exit 2) and the Glen Charlie Road overpass in Wareham. This photo was taken before the exit renumbering in 2020.

In the 1970s, the MassDPW changed the planned designation of the unconstructed Route 25 expressway northwest of Route 24 to I-495. When this portion of I-495 was completed in 1982, the state also designated the existing alignment of Route 25 between Route 24 and the I-195 interchange in Wareham as I-495. After the reassignment, Route 25 was shortened to a 2.5-mile (4 km) stretch from I-195 east to Downtown Wareham.

From 1969 until 1987, the eastern terminus of Route 25 was at a junction with Maple Springs Road, US 6 and Route 28 in Wareham near the modern location of Exit 2. The MassDPW and the Massachusetts Highway Department (MassHighway) had plans to extend the freeway eastward to Cape Cod as early as 1953, when the route was included in the proposed Cape Cod Expressway that would connect New York City with Cape Cod. Route 25 was originally planned to connect to the Sagamore Bridge, which carried US 6 over the Cape Cod Canal and was used to access the towns of Hyannis and Provincetown. In 1962, however, the MassDPW conducted traffic studies on the two bridges crossing the canal and found that the Sagamore Bridge was above vehicular capacity, whereas the more southern Bourne Bridge had excess capacity. The Route 25 freeway was then redesigned to cross over the Bourne Bridge and connect with the Mid-Cape Highway (US 6) on the southern side of the canal via the proposed Southside Connector. The connector would have been constructed through the Massachusetts Military Reservation in Bourne, but was canceled by the MassDPW and MassHighway in 1977 when environmental tests indicated the freeway would disturb underground aquifers serving as water sources for the region. MassDPW instead changed the proposed eastern terminus of the Route 25 expressway to the approach ramps of the Bourne Bridge.

=== Completion of the freeway ===
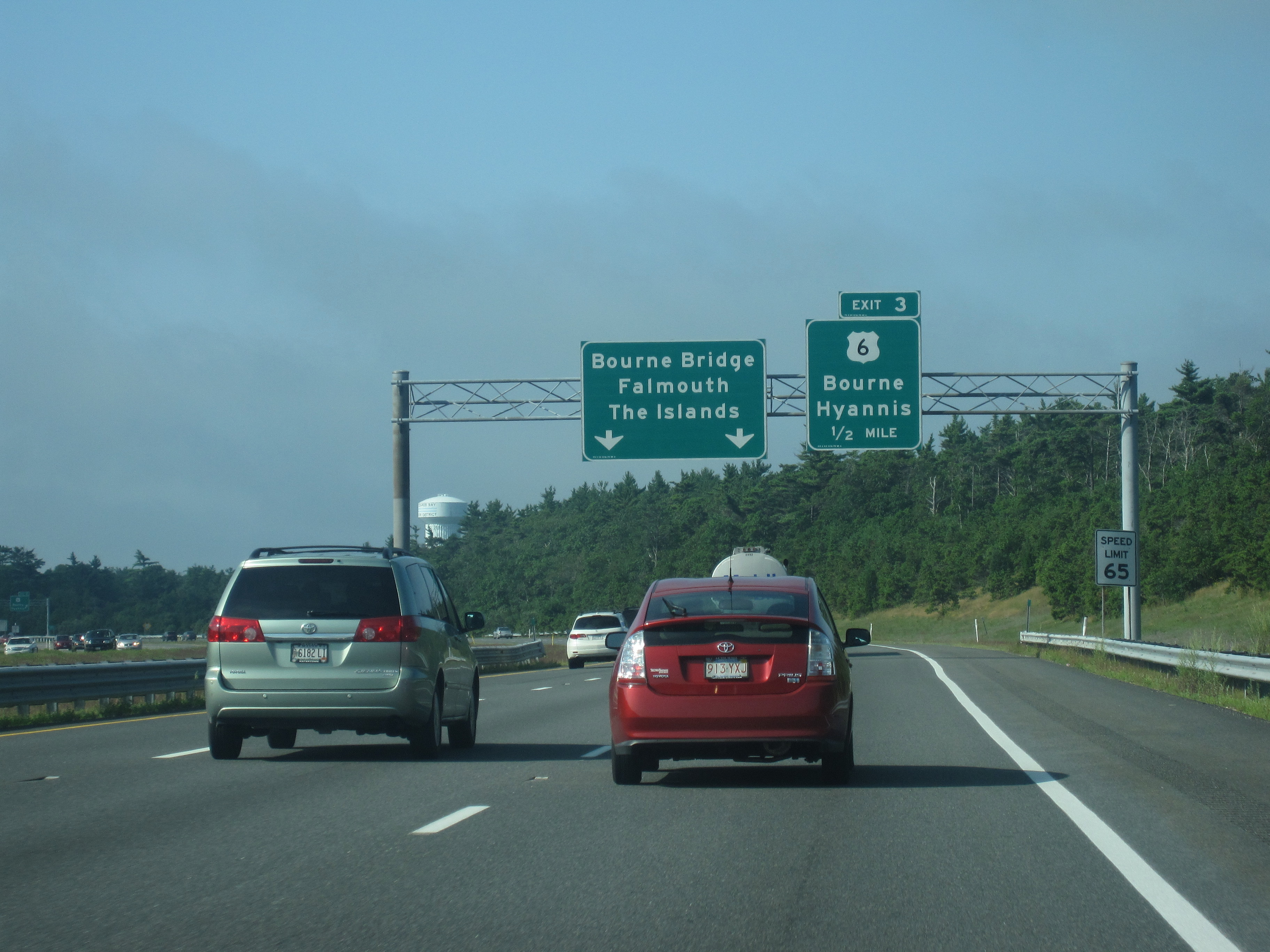
Route 25 eastbound approaching Exit 10 (old Exit 3) and its eastern terminus in Bourne. The Bourne Bridge carries Route 28 onto Cape Cod. This photo was taken before the exit renumbering in 2020.

Construction of Route 25 east of Wareham, however, was delayed for nearly three decades to property disputes, environmental concerns and resistance from business owners in Buzzards Bay village, who claimed the freeway would divert all the traffic, and their business, elsewhere, leaving a ghost town in its wake. The proposed alignment ran through land where much of the state's cranberry harvest was located, and this led to lengthy lawsuits and delays. In particular, farmers were concerned that salt runoff from winter ice removal would harm cranberry harvests. Throughout the 1970s and 1980s, the MassDPW developed several proposals to control storm water runoff and avoid potential damage to the cranberry crops. Engineers for the department developed four different drainage systems to be used along the length of the freeway that would divert runoff away from the Wareham River basin. In addition, the freeway was planned with a thicker asphalt pavement that was largely impervious to water.

The freeway was also delayed due to a larger property dispute with Hope Ingersoll, the owner of the 900-acre (364 ha) Grazing Fields Farm on Bournedale Road in Bourne, well known in the region as an artists' colony and a producer of organic food. MassDPW proposed constructing Route 25 through the center of the farm, but Ingersoll hired engineers to develop an alternate routing. In 1978, MassDPW rejected Ingersoll's design, instead approving the alignment that ran through farmland seized by eminent domain. In 1980, a state judge ruled that MassDPW had to conduct environmental studies on both the original routing and Ingersoll's proposal. MassDPW eventually opted to construct Ingersoll's design, giving Route 25 a longer alignment that arced to the north and east of Grazing Fields Farm before turning westward toward the Buzzards Bay business district and the Bourne Bridge. The route finally began construction in 1982, and in 1989 the MassDPW was forced to pay Ingersoll $2.6 million (1982 USD) for 90 acres (36 ha) of farmland seized for the expressway's construction.

In 1987, the final 7.5-mile (12 km) segment of Route 25 from Maple Springs Road in Wareham to the Bourne Bridge was completed. A rest area and information center in Plymouth also opened with the freeway. The new expressway relieved congestion along US 6 and Route 28 in the Buzzards Bay business district, greatly reducing the number of accidents along the approach to the Bourne Bridge. In 2007, MassHighway completed a renumbering of the three interchanges along the length of Route 25 as part of a signing upgrade project. Previously, the I-195 interchange had been numbered Exit 1 as part of I-495's numbering scheme, with the Onset interchange also being Exit 1 as part of Route 25's own scheme. This led to a confusing situation in which the road had two consecutive Exit 1s, so MassHighway devised a solution in which I-495 and MA-25 would "share" Exit 1 (the I-195 interchange), and all other exits on MA-25 would be bumped up a number. Due to the previous confusion, and despite the solution, the Massachusetts Department of Transportation (MassDOT) has enacted a proposition which would have MA-25 cease to exist and be replaced by I-495, but has yet to implement the plan, which has been postponed indefinitely.

== Exit list ==
All interchanges were to be renumbered to mileage-based numbers under a project scheduled to start in 2016. The project was postponed by the MassDOT until November 18, 2019, when MassDOT confirmed that beginning in late summer 2020, the exit renumbering project would begin. The renumbering of Exits 2 and 3 on Route 25 took place on November 23 and 24, 2020 (Exit 1 was not changed).

County	Location	mi	km	Old exit	New exit	Destinations	Notes
Plymouth	Wareham	0.00	0.00	—	—	I-495 north – Marlboro	Continuation north
Plymouth	Wareham	0.00	0.00	—	1	I-195 west – New Bedford, Providence, RI	Eastern terminus and exit 40A on I-195; trumpet interchange
Plymouth	Wareham	2.606	4.194	2	3	Route 28 to US 6 – Onset, Wareham	Eastbound exit and westbound entrance; access via Maple Springs Road
Plymouth	Wareham	3.406	5.481	2	3	US 6 / Route 28 – Onset, Wareham	Westbound exit and eastbound entrance; access via Glen Charlie Road
Plymouth	Plymouth	6.663	10.723	Rest area (eastbound)			
Barnstable	Bourne	9.659	15.545	3	10	US 6 / Route 28 – Bourne, Hyannis, Buzzards Bay	Route 28 not signed eastbound; western end of Route 28 concurrency
Barnstable	Bourne	10.006	16.103	—	—	Route 28 south (Bourne Bridge) – Falmouth, The Islands	Continuation south; eastern end of Route 28 concurrency
1.000 mi = 1.609 km; 1.000 km = 0.621 mi: Concurrency terminus; Incomplete access

== Southside Connector proposal ==
Southside Connector
- Length: 5 mi (8.0 km)

Proposed Southside Connector corridor highlighted in red

The Southside Connector was first proposed in the 1950s as an extension of Route 25. It was part of the Cape Cod Expressway, which eventually morphed into the Mid-Cape Highway. It was originally planned to be a safe alternative to US 6 and was to be located on the northern side of the Cape Cod Canal.

As early as 1962, the Massachusetts Department of Public Works conducted a study once questions on the plans were raised. One study concluded that the Sagamore Bridge was over capacity while the Bourne Bridge was under capacity. From these studies, it was determined that the expressway would cross the canal near the Bourne Bridge. Expressway connections would connect to US 6 and Route 28 on the south side of the canal near the Bourne Rotary. Another crossing that would carry three lanes would be built next to the bridge to facilitate this extra traffic.

Between 1968 and 1977, studies concluded that the connector would be routed along the south side of the canal. The route would begin at the US 6 and Route 25 interchange at the canal, cross over the canal, turn east at the Bourne Rotary, which would be turned into an interchange, and go east until it reached the Mid-Cape Highway near exit 59. The total cost would be $35 million.

The project was put on hold the next decade, but never cancelled outright, when concerns arose about the status of the groundwater aquifers which sat under the reservation. Those aquifers were already polluted from years of military training, but the pollution was not discovered until about 10 years later.

In the early 2000s, the project had renewed interest due to gridlock on both of the canal's sides. Although the project was projected to have cost $35 million in the 1970s, updated construction estimates ranged from $100 million to $200 million. Local leaders expressed support for the project provided it would include a third road crossing of the canal, to address over-capacity issues with the Bourne Bridge and Sagamore Bridge. Although the development was planned for well over 15 years, the Great Recession caused the project to be cancelled.

== See also ==
- Massachusetts Route 3
