= Fawn Pond (Massachusetts) =

US lake

- Location within Massachusetts Location within the United States
- Location: Plymouth, Massachusetts
- Coordinates: 41°49′37″N 70°38′12″W
- Primary outflows: stream that flows into the Agawam River
- Basin countries: United States
- Surface area: 33 acres (13 ha)

Fawn Pond is a 33-acre (13 ha) pond in Plymouth, Massachusetts. The pond is located south of Halfway Pond, northwest of Deer Pond, north of White Island Pond, northeast of Five Mile Pond, and east of Fearing Pond and Abner Pond, outside the eastern boundary of Myles Standish State Forest. The outflow is a stream that flows into the Agawam River. It is primarily used by campers at Camp Squanto, a summer camp operated by The Boy Scouts of America (BSA). Species that inhabit the pond include but aren't limited to, Large and Smallmouth Bass, Channel Catfish, Chain Pickerel, and Sunfish.
