= Mill Pond (Wareham, Massachusetts) =

Lake of the United States

- Agawam Mill Pond
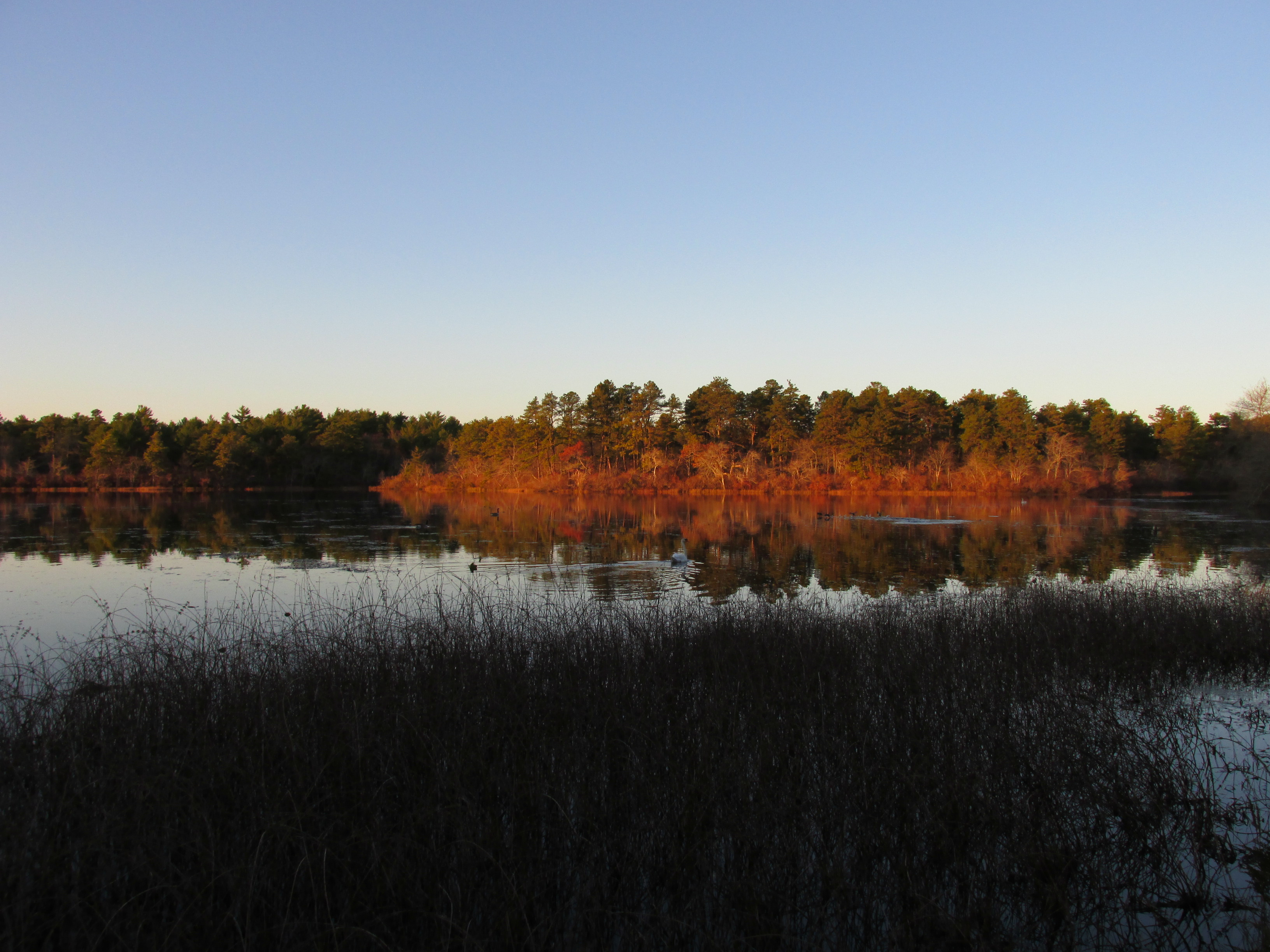
- Mill Pond

- Location within Massachusetts Location within the United States
- Location: Wareham, Massachusetts
- Coordinates: 41°46′15″N 70°40′19″W
- Primary inflows: Agawam River
- Primary outflows: Agawam River
- Basin countries: United States
- Surface area: 150 acres (61 ha)

Mill Pond, also known unofficially as Agawam Mill Pond, is a 150-acre (0.61 km^{2}) pond in Wareham, Massachusetts. The pond is located northwest of Union Pond, west and north of Spectacle Pond, west of Sandy Pond, and southwest of Glen Charlie Pond. The Agawam River runs through the pond. Route 25 runs through the southwestern part of the pond, and the Exit 3 off-ramp from Route 25 eastbound lies along the shore en route to Glen Charlie Road, which runs along the pond's eastern shore.
