= Little Long Pond (Wareham, Massachusetts) =

Lake in Massachusetts, United States

- Location within Massachusetts Location within the United States
- Location: Wareham and Plymouth, Massachusetts
- Coordinates: 41°48′15″N 70°39′45″W
- Basin countries: United States
- Surface area: 45 acres (18 ha)

Little Long Pond is a 45-acre (18 ha) pond in Wareham and Plymouth, Massachusetts. The pond is located east of the southeasternmost point of Myles Standish State Forest within Camp Cachalot, southeast of Charge Pond, southwest of Five Mile Pond, and south of Abner Pond.

There is another Little Long Pond entirely within Plymouth's borders located north of Long Pond and Gallows Pond.
