= Halfway Pond =

Pond in Massachusetts, United States

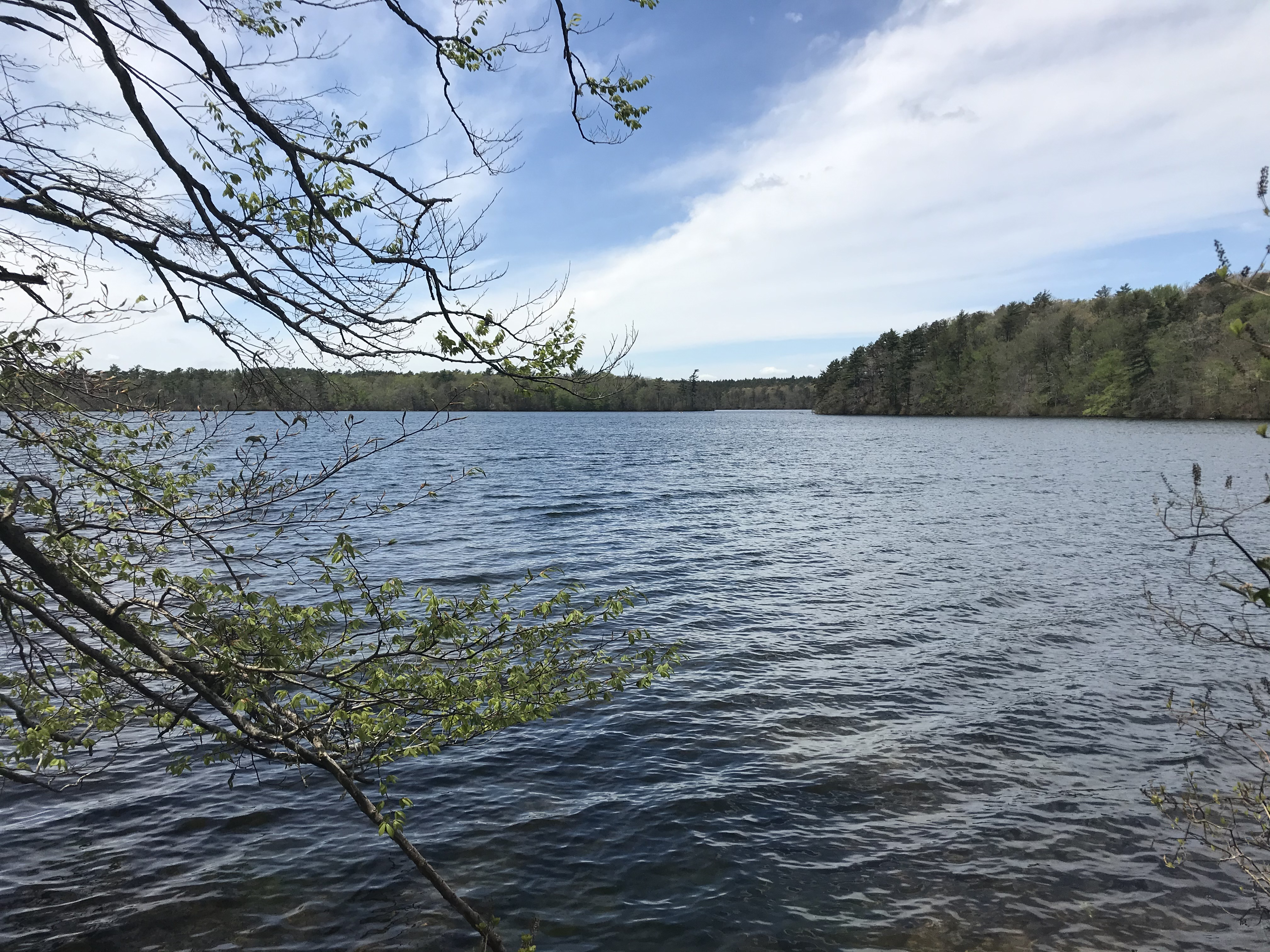
- Halfway Pond

- Location within Massachusetts
- Location: Plymouth, Massachusetts
- Coordinates: 41°51′10″N 70°37′13″W
- Type: Pond
- Primary inflows: Groundwater springs
- Primary outflows: Agawam River
- Basin countries: United States
- Surface area: 232 acres (94 ha)
- Average depth: 9 ft (2.7 m)
- Max. depth: 13 ft (4.0 m)
- Islands: Halfway Pond Island
- Settlements: Halfway Pond village

Halfway Pond a 232-acre (0.94 km^{2}) warm water pond located in Plymouth, Massachusetts between Myles Standish State Forest and Long Pond, west of Round Pond, southwest of Gallows Pond, and north of Fawn Pond and White Island Pond. The average depth is nine feet and the maximum depth is 13 feet (4.0 m). The pond is fed by groundwater springs and drains into the Agawam River. Halfway Pond Island lies in the middle of the pond and is managed as a research natural area by The Nature Conservancy in Massachusetts. There are almost three miles (5 km) of shoreline.

Access here is informal and can be located off of Mast Road, a portion of which abuts the western shoreline of the pond. Parking is limited to just two or three cars and boaters will have to stick with canoes and other car top craft. Substantial amounts of shoreline are open to fishing.

== Halfway Pond village ==
Halfway Pond, a small village of Plymouth, is located on the southwestern shore of Halfway Pond 41°50′32″N 70°37′13″W.

== See also ==
- Neighborhoods in Plymouth, Massachusetts
- Plymouth, Massachusetts
