= Parker Mills Pond =

Lake of the United States of America

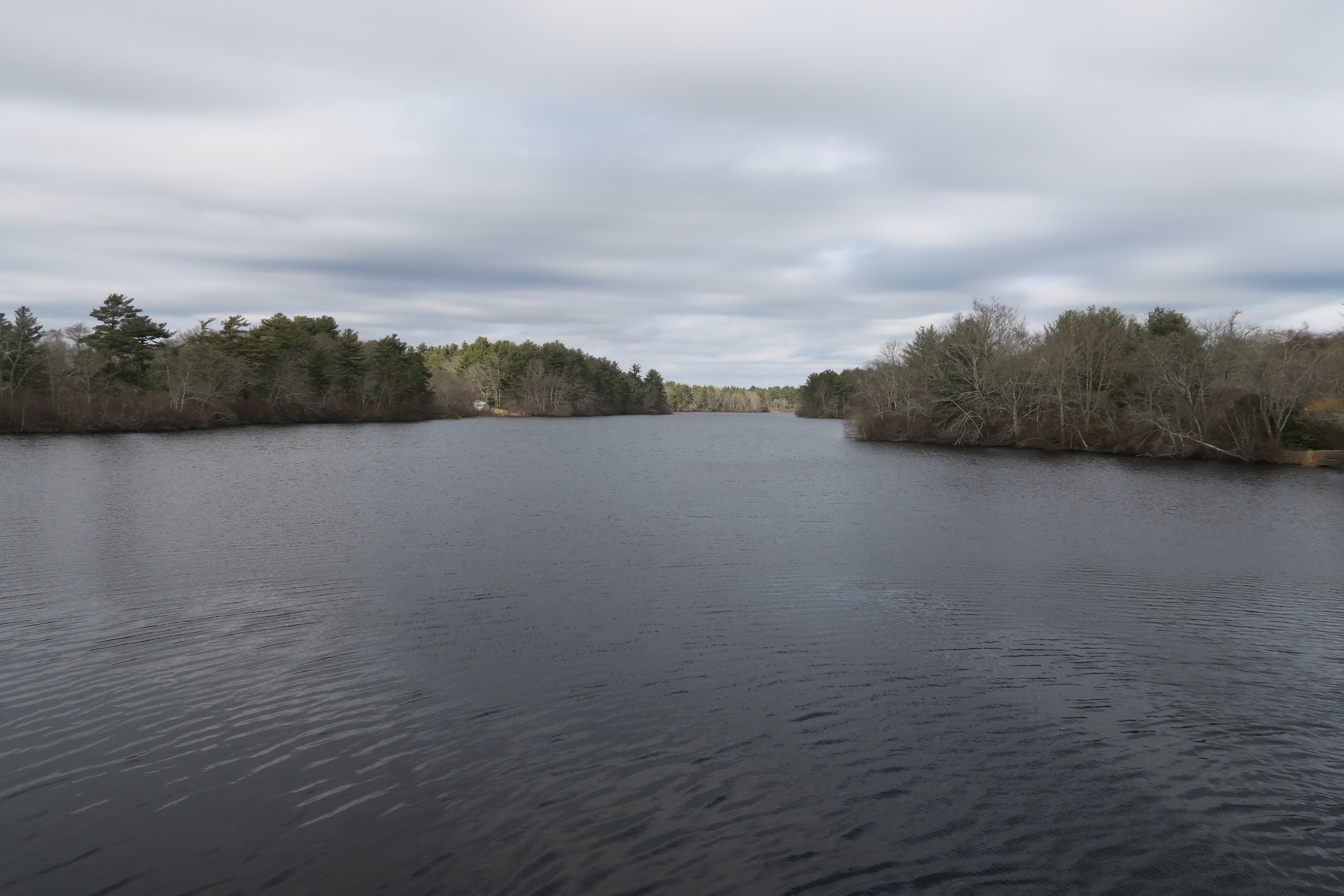
- Parker Mills Pond

- Location within Massachusetts
- Location: Wareham, Massachusetts
- Coordinates: 41°46′30″N 70°43′14″W
- Primary inflows: Wankinco River, Harlow Brook
- Primary outflows: Wankinco River
- Basin countries: United States
- Surface area: 105 acres (42 ha)

Parker Mills Pond is a 105-acre (0.42 km^{2}) pond in Wareham, Massachusetts. The Wankinco River flows through the pond. Additionally, Harlow Brook flows into the pond. The water quality is impaired due to non-native aquatic plants and non-native fish. Route 25 runs through the northern part of the pond just east of the highway's terminus with Interstates 195 and 495, and Route 28 runs along the southern shore of the pond.
