= Isla Blanca =

Isla Blanca or Blanca Island and their plurals may refer to:

== Islands ==
=== Argentina ===
- Islas Blancas (es or es), Atlantic coastal islands off Chubut Province, Argentina, List of islands of Argentina
- Isla Blanca (es), small island in Deseado Department, Santa Cruz
- Bristol Island, in the South Sandwich Islands, claimed by Argentina as Isla Blanca
- Islote Blanco, Tierra del Fuego southern tip of Chile and Argentina, off Cape San Pío, also known as Blanca Island and Isla Blanca 55°03′48″S 066°33′12″W

=== Costa Rica ===
- Isla Cabo Blanco, Pacific coastal island off Costa Rica, also known as Blanca Island, part of Cabo Blanco Absolute Natural Reserve 09°32′31″N 085°06′46″W

=== México ===
- Isla Blanca, Quintana Roo (es), Isla Mujeres (municipality) Caribbean coastal island north of Cancun, Mexico 21°22′59″N 086°47′49″W
- Islas Blancas, Guerrero Pacific coastal islands off the Costa Grande of Guerrero, Mexico
- Isla Blanca, Baja California, an island in Bahía Concepción, Baja California Sur, Mexico
- Isla Blanca, Sonora, Gulf of California coastal island off Guaymas, Mexico, also known as Islote Peruano 27°54′32″N 110°58′12″W

=== Perú ===
- Isla Blanca, Santa, in Áncash, guano island off the coast of Peru
- Isla Blanca, (es), Ica, Pisco Province

=== Philippines ===
- Isla Blanca, Philippines, sand island off Mambajao, Camiguin Island, the Philippines

=== Venezuela ===
- Isla Blanca, Nueva Esparta, two Caribbean coastal islands near Margarita Island off Nueva Esparta, Venezuela, Major and Minor, 10°57′51″N 063°47′29″W
- Blanquilla Island, Venezuela, also known as Blanca Island and Isla Blanca, in the Caribbean Sea

=== United States ===
- early name for Galveston Island, see History of Galveston, Texas

== Non islands ==
- Barra del Solís a barrio (borough or neighborhood) of Parque del Plata, Uruguay, known as Isla Blanca
- "Isla Blanca", an electronic dance music single by First State, a.k.a. "One World"
- Isla Blanca Park, a preserve and recreational park on South Padre Island, Texas

== See also ==
- White Island (disambiguation)
