= Abner Pond =

Lake in Massachusetts, US

- Location within Massachusetts
- Location: Plymouth, Massachusetts
- Coordinates: 41°49′12″N 70°39′33″W
- Basin countries: United States
- Surface area: 10 acres (4.0 ha)

Abner Pond is a 10-acre (40,000 m^{2}) pond in Plymouth, Massachusetts. The pond is located east of the boundary of Myles Standish State Forest within Camp Cachalot, southeast of Fearing Pond, northeast of Charge Pond, north of Little Long Pond, northwest of Five Mile Pond, and west of Fawn Pond.
