= Wankinco River =

River in the U.S. state of Massachusetts

Coordinates: 41°45′24″N 70°42′45″W

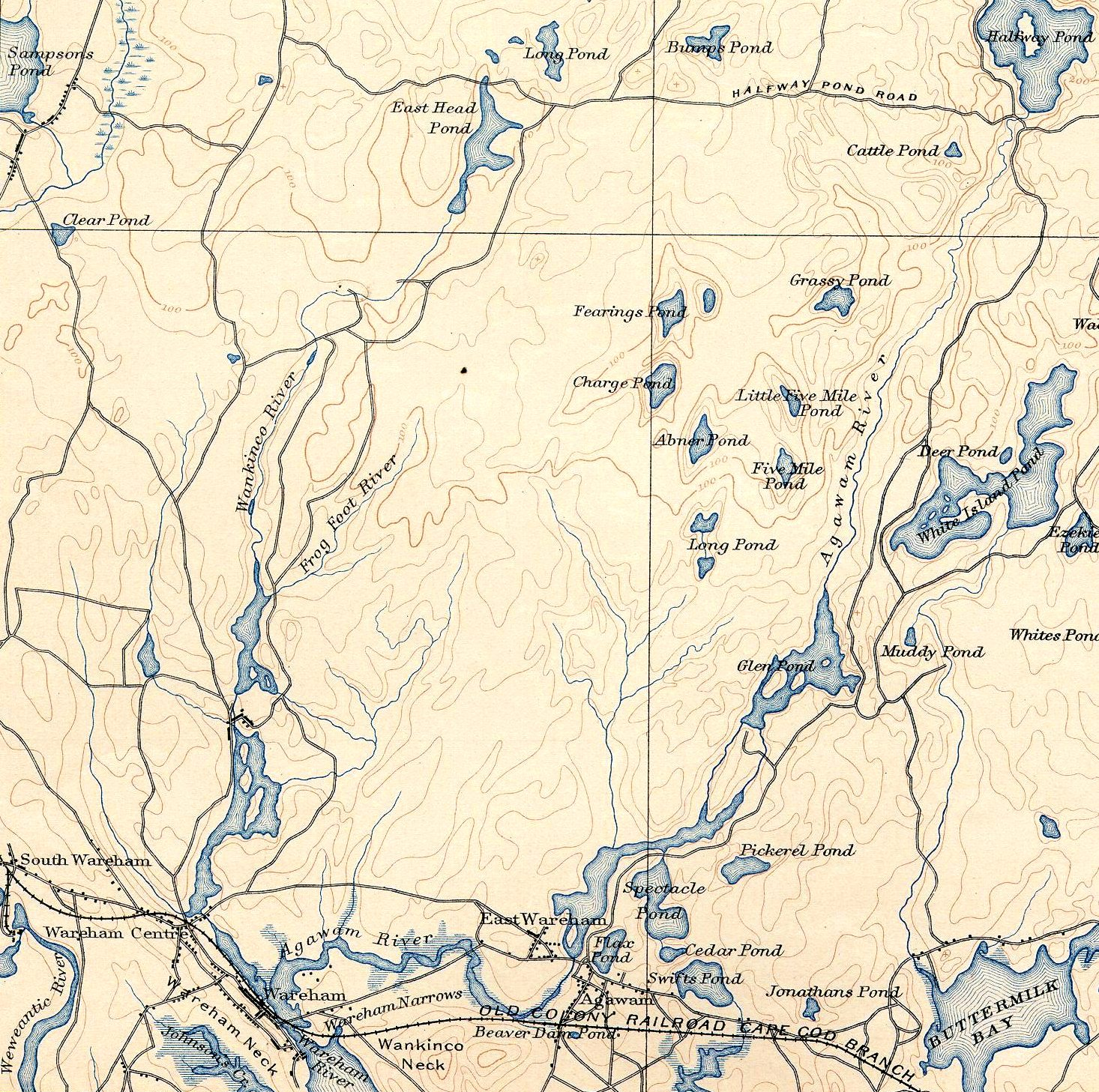
Wankinco River and environs

The Wankinco River is a 7.3-mile-long (11.7 km) river in eastern Massachusetts, United States. It is a tributary of the Wareham River, which drains into Buzzards Bay.

Although now spelled Wankinco, it was previously written as Wankinquoah, which may have been derived from Wonqun, meaning "crooked".

The river originates at East Head Reservoir, a pond in the Myles Standish State Forest, and flows southwards through various impoundments and cranberry bogs to join the Agawam River near the center of Wareham, Massachusetts, after which it forms the Wareham River, forming Wareham's main harbor with a depth of about 12 feet (3.7 m). During a portion of its course, it serves as the boundary between Carver and Plymouth, Massachusetts.
