= New Long Pond =

Lake in Massachusetts, United States

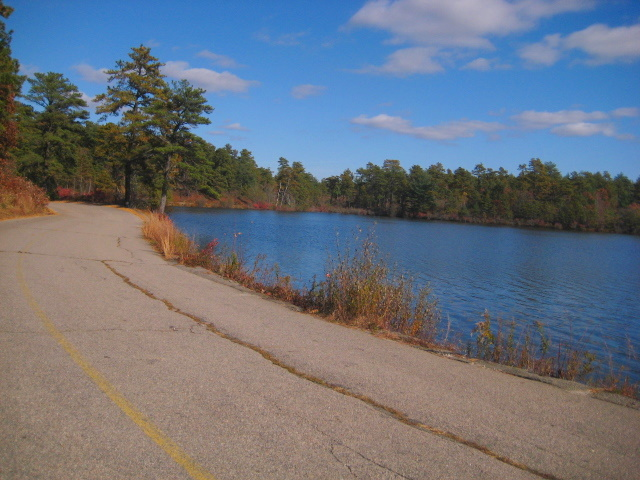
- New Long Pond from Lower College Pond

- Location within Massachusetts
- Location: Plymouth, Massachusetts
- Coordinates: 41°51′10″N 70°40′45″W
- Basin countries: United States
- Surface area: 23 acres (9.3 ha)

New Long Pond is a 23-acre (93,000 m^{2}) pond in the Myles Standish State Forest in Plymouth, Massachusetts. The pond is located northeast of East Head Reservoir and southwest of College Pond and Three Cornered Pond. The water quality is impaired due to non-native aquatic plants.
