= Gallows Pond =

Kettlehole pond in Plymouth

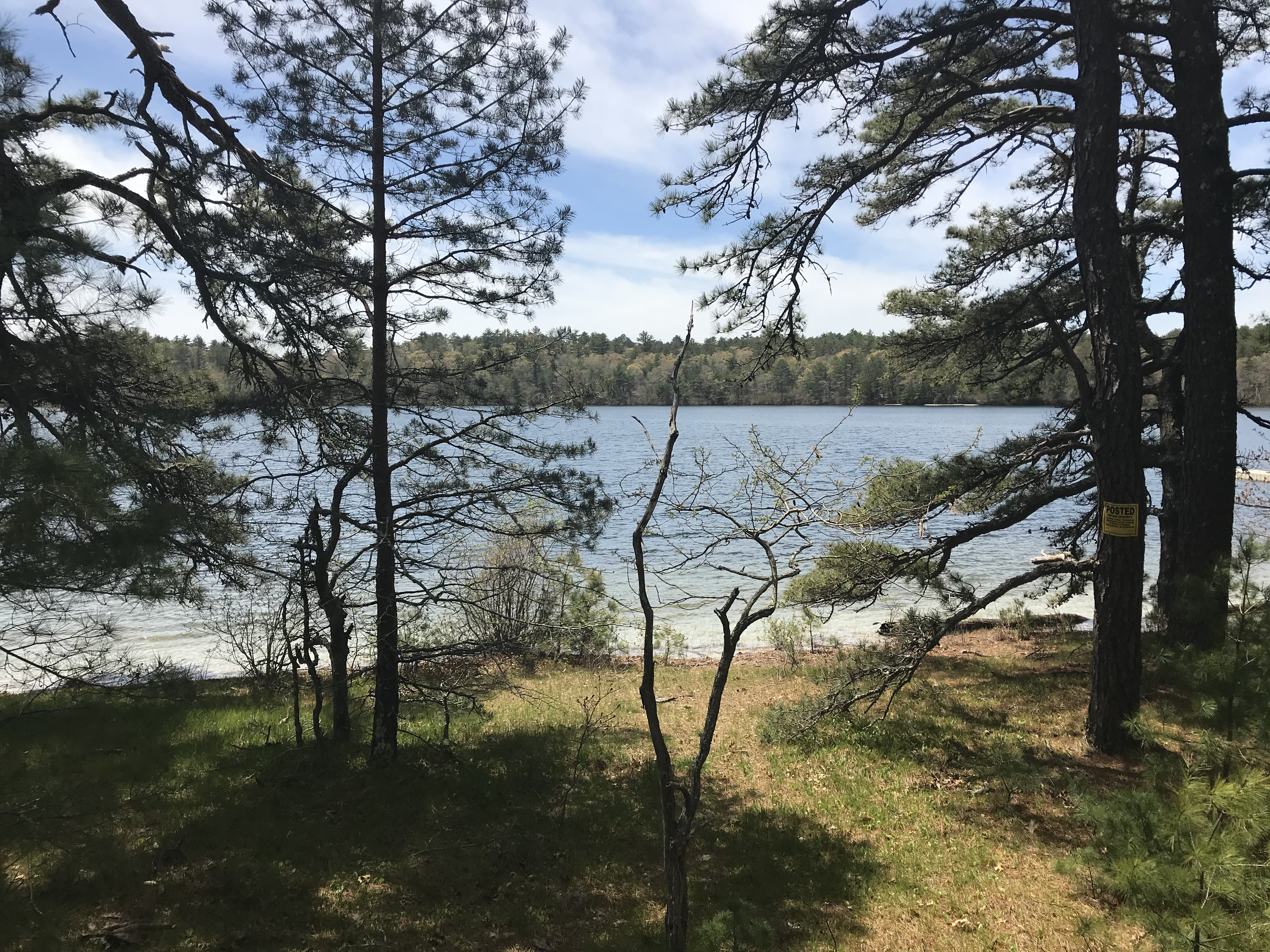
- Gallows Pond

- Location within Massachusetts
- Location: Plymouth, Massachusetts
- Coordinates: 41°51′45″N 70°37′00″W
- Type: kettlehole
- Basin countries: United States
- Surface area: 43 acres (17 ha)
- Settlements: Long Pond

Gallows Pond is a 43-acre (170,000 m^{2}) kettlehole pond in Plymouth, Massachusetts. The pond is west of and adjacent to Long Pond, south of Little Long Pond, and northeast of Halfway Pond. Camp Wind-in-the-Pines Girl Scout Center is located along the shore of this pond.
