= Fearing Pond =

Pond in Plymouth, Massachusetts, United States

- Location within Massachusetts
- Location: Plymouth, Massachusetts
- Coordinates: 41°49′50″N 70°40′00″W
- Basin countries: United States
- Surface area: 24 acres (9.7 ha)
- Average depth: 10 ft (3.0 m)
- Max. depth: 20 ft (6.1 m)

Fearing Pond, also erroneously named on some maps as Fearings Pond (pronounced to rhyme with bearing), is a 24-acre (97,000 m^{2}) natural kettlehole pond in Plymouth, Massachusetts. The average depth is ten feet and the maximum depth is 20 feet (6.1 m). It is located in the southern section of Myles Standish State Forest, north of Charge Pond, northwest of Abner Pond, west of Fawn Pond, south of College Pond, southeast of East Head Reservoir, and east of the forest headquarters. There is no direct access to the pond as the bridge over the Wankinco River connecting Cranberry Road in Carver and Fearing Pond Road in Plymouth was washed out. The bridge has not been rebuilt.

Camp Cachalot and Camp Squanto are nearby. The pond is fed by groundwater. A public beach is located on the southeast side of the pond and on the northern side of the pond is where boating access is available. Summer cottages and campsites line the perimeter of the pond. The pond is usually stocked by MassWildlife.
