= Deer Pond (Plymouth, Massachusetts) =

Lake in Massachusetts, United States of America

- Location within Massachusetts Location within the United States
- Location: Plymouth, Massachusetts
- Coordinates: 41.8203793°N 70.6251915°W
- Basin countries: United States
- Surface area: 11 acres (4.5 ha)

Deer Pond is an 11-acre (45,000 m^{2}) pond in Plymouth, Massachusetts. The pond is located southeast of Fawn Pond and northwest of the eastern basin of White Island Pond.
