= Glen Charlie Pond =

Lake in Massachusetts

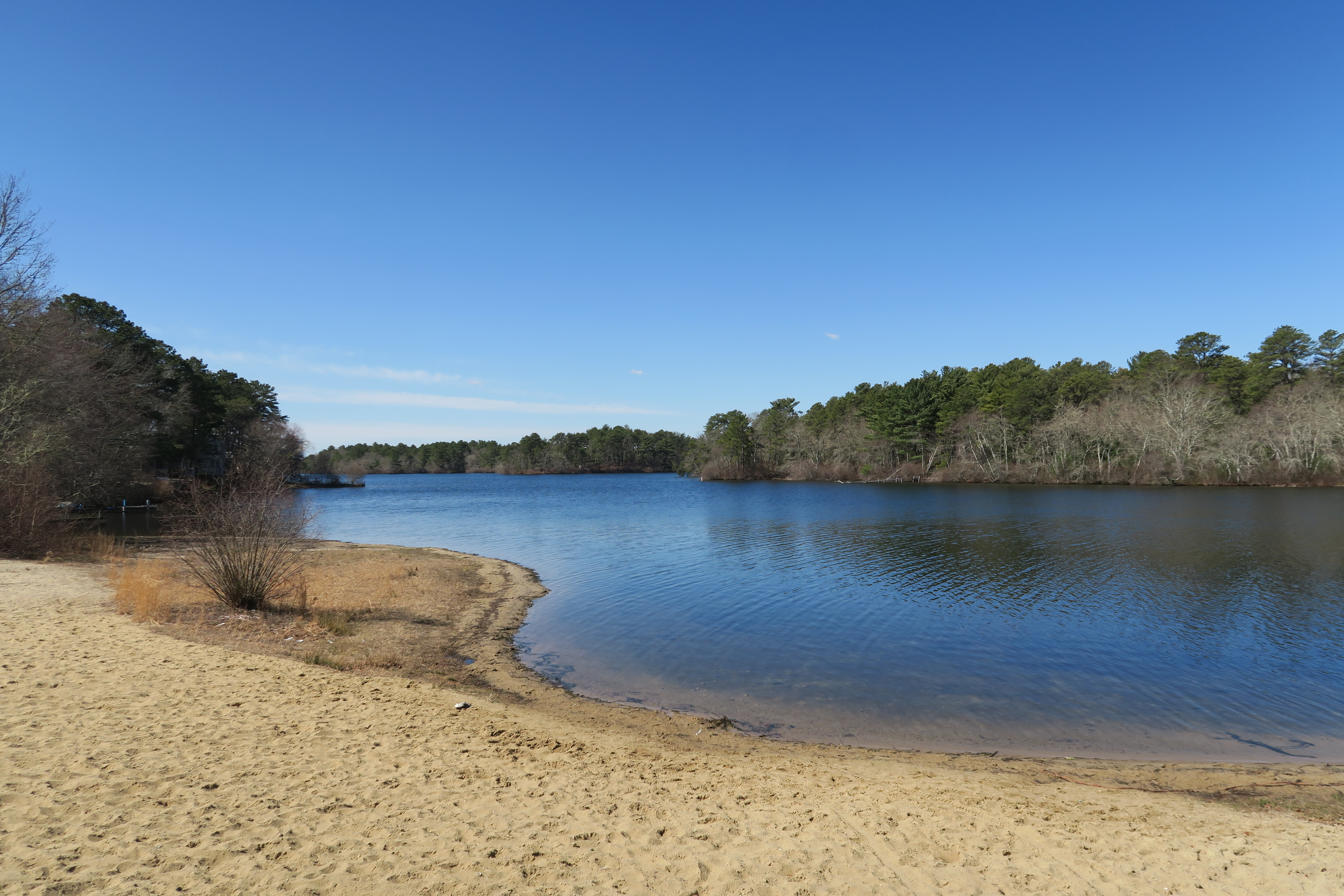
- Glen Charlie Pond

- Location within Massachusetts
- Location: Wareham, Massachusetts
- Coordinates: 41°47′13″N 70°39′08″W
- Primary inflows: Agawam River
- Primary outflows: Agawam River
- Basin countries: United States
- Surface area: 185 acres (75 ha)
- Max. depth: 12 ft (3.7 m)

Glen Charlie Pond is a 185-acre (0.75 km^{2}) warm water pond in Wareham, Massachusetts. The maximum depth of the pond is 12 feet (3.7 m). The pond is part of the Agawam River. The pond is located southwest of White Island Shores, northeast of Spectacle Pond, north of Sandy Pond, and approximately 2 miles (3.2 km) north of Route 25. Exit 2 off Route 25 eastbound provides direct access along Glen Charlie Road. The pond is developed with summer and year-round homes mostly along the southern and eastern shores. Public access is possible through town-owned land at the gas pipeline crossing. This pond is popular for both warm-water fishing and ice fishing.
