= Round Pond (Plymouth, Massachusetts) =

Pond in Massachusetts

- Location within Massachusetts Location within the United States
- Location: Plymouth, Massachusetts
- Coordinates: 41°51′09″N 70°36′15″W
- Type: Pond
- Basin countries: United States
- Surface area: 10 acres (4.0 ha)
- Settlements: Long Pond village

Round Pond is a 10-acre (40,000 m^{2}) pond in Plymouth, Massachusetts. The pond is adjacent to Long Pond to the southwest, and east of Long Pond village and Halfway Pond.
