= East Head Reservoir =

Body of water in Massachusetts, US

- Location within Massachusetts
- Location: Carver and Plymouth, Massachusetts
- Coordinates: 41°50′34″N 70°41′10″W
- Primary outflows: Wankinco River
- Basin countries: United States
- Surface area: 92 acres (37 ha)

East Head Reservoir, also known as East Head Pond, is a 92-acre (370,000 m^{2}) pond in Carver and Plymouth, Massachusetts, within the Myles Standish State Forest, located northeast of the forest headquarters, east of Barrett Pond, southwest of New Long Pond and College Pond, and northwest of Fearing Pond. The reservoir is the headwaters to the Wankinco River.
