= Union Pond (Massachusetts) =

Pond in Massachusetts, United States

- Location within Massachusetts Location within the United States
- Location: Wareham, Massachusetts
- Coordinates: 41°45′45″N 70°40′16″W
- Basin countries: United States
- Surface area: 25 acres (10 ha)

Union Pond is a 25-acre (100,000 m^{2}) pond in Wareham, Massachusetts. The pond is located southeast of Mill Pond. Route 25 runs north of the pond, Routes 6 and 28 runs south of the pond, and Glen Charlie Road runs west of the pond.
