= Little Long Pond (Plymouth, Massachusetts) =

Lake in Massachusetts, United States

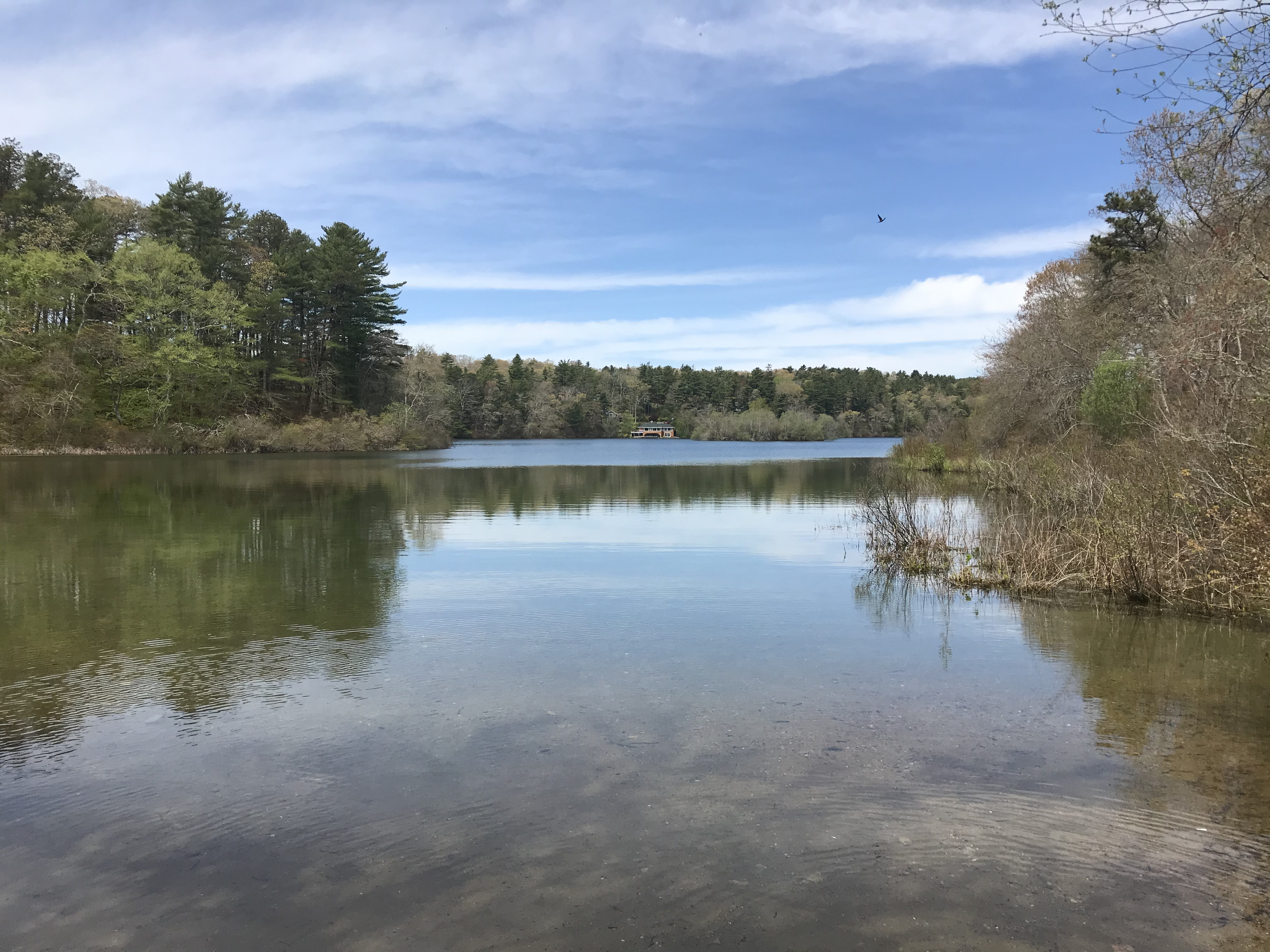
- Little Long Pond

- Location within Massachusetts Location within the United States
- Location: Plymouth, Massachusetts
- Coordinates: 41°52′10″N 70°36′50″W
- Primary outflows: Long Pond
- Basin countries: United States
- Surface area: 19 acres (7.7 ha)
- Settlements: Long Pond

Little Long Pond is a 19-acre (77,000 m^{2}) pond in Plymouth, Massachusetts, north of Long Pond and Gallows Pond. The outflow of this pond is a stream that feeds into Long Pond.

There is another Little Long Pond partially within Plymouth's borders located east of the southeasternmost point of Myles Standish State Forest.
