= College Pond =

Pond in Plymouth, Massachusetts, US

- Location within Massachusetts
- Location: Plymouth, Massachusetts
- Coordinates: 41°52′04″N 70°39′45″W
- Type: kettlehole
- Basin countries: United States
- Surface area: 53 acres (21 ha)
- Average depth: 10 ft (3.0 m)
- Max. depth: 24 ft (7.3 m)

College Pond is a 53-acre (210,000 m^{2}) natural kettlehole pond in Plymouth, Massachusetts, located in the Myles Standish State Forest northeast of East Head Reservoir, Three Cornered Pond, New Long Pond and Barrett Pond, and north of Fearing Pond. There is a swimming beach and picnic area along the north shore of the pond.

College Pond may be named after a series, or collection, of nearby ponds.
