= Cape Cod Expressway =

Proposed highway in the northeastern US

Route information
- Length: 260 mi (420 km)
- Existed: 1953–1960s

Major junctions
- West end: New York, New York
- East end: Provincetown, Massachusetts

Location
- Country: United States
- States: New York, Connecticut, Rhode Island, Massachusetts

Highway system

The Cape Cod Expressway is the name given to a highway that was proposed to have gone from New York City to Provincetown, Massachusetts. The road later became part of many highways and expressways, although it was never built and signed as a single road (and some portions never became highways).

== Route description ==
The Cape Cod Expressway in Connecticut, which was the greater part of the planned route that was actually completed. Today this road serves as Connecticut's portion of Interstate 95.

Coming out of New York City, the route would have followed Interstate 95 along the modern New England Thruway until the Connecticut border, where it would meet up with what later became the Connecticut Turnpike. Once it reached Rhode Island, the expressway would follow the present-day Route 138 to Route 24, Interstate 195 (where it would cross into Massachusetts), Route 25, and U.S. Route 6 all the way to Provincetown, Massachusetts.

== History ==
During the early second half of the 20th century, states began to experience traffic congestion affecting local roads. In response, many states began building expressways in order to alleviate this congestion. In 1953, the governors of New York, Connecticut, Rhode Island, and Massachusetts began to plan a 260-mile-long (420 km) expressway that would link New York City to Provincetown, Massachusetts. The highway was projected to cost around $75 million, and would be between four and six lanes wide. Tolls would be charged for parts of the highway, although the road as a whole would not be tolled. The route was billed as "the most direct and shortest highway route between the present and potentially major urban-industrial and recreational concentrations, and between significant military installations of the shore route area."

The route was built as planned from New York City into Rhode Island. Because of highway revolts, the route along Route 138 to Route 24 ended up not being completed (both roads were also concurrently signed with Interstate 895 at one point, as well). In Massachusetts, the Charles M. Braga Jr. Memorial Bridge, which carries Interstate 195, was built with the eventual aim of carrying the expressway. Route 25 in Massachusetts was eventually constructed along the proposed route of the expressway. In Bourne, plans for the expressway turned into the Southside Connector which was planned around the same time as the expressway, but also never built. On Cape Cod, the road turned into the Mid-Cape Highway and was constructed as an expressway as far as the Orleans Rotary. Because the road served as a main thoroughfare for towns north of Orleans, the expressway idea likely was abandoned, although between North Truro and Provincetown, grade-separated interchanges were constructed in remote sections.
