= White Island Pond =

Pond in Massachusetts, United States

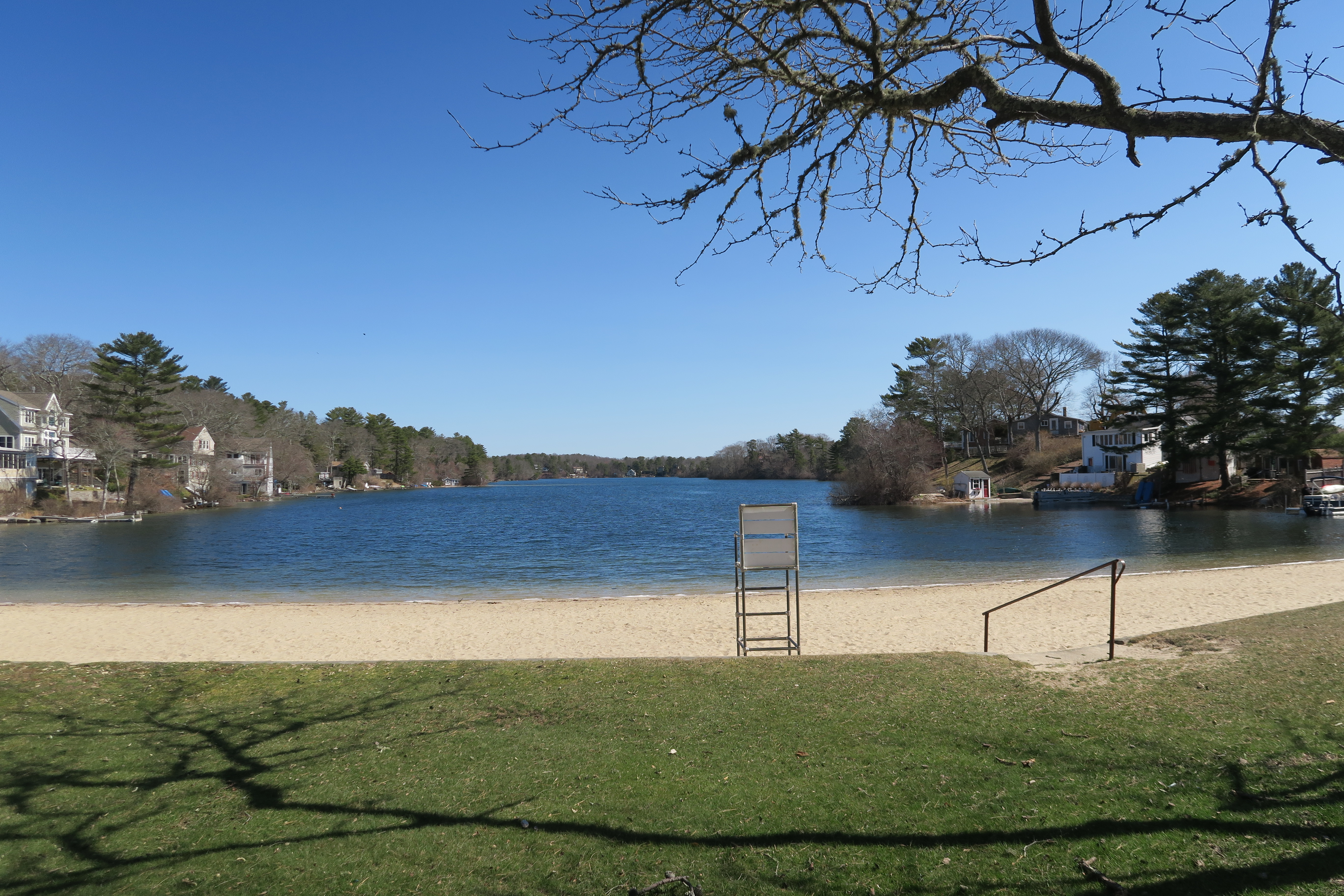
- White Island Pond

- Location within Massachusetts
- Location: Plymouth and Wareham, Massachusetts
- Coordinates: 41°48′41″N 70°37′12″W
- Basin countries: United States
- Surface area: Western: 122 acres (0.49 km^{2}); Eastern: 159 acres (0.64 km^{2})
- Settlements: White Island Shores

White Island Pond is a system of two ponds in Plymouth and Wareham, Massachusetts. The area of the western basin is 122 acres (0.49 km^{2}), and the area of the eastern basin is 159 acres (0.64 km^{2}). The pond is located east of Glen Charlie Pond in Wareham and, in Plymouth, south of Halfway Pond, southwest of Fawn Pond and Deer Pond, and west of Ezekiel Pond.
