= Barrett Pond (Carver, Massachusetts) =

Lake of the United States

- Location within Massachusetts Location within the United States
- Location: Carver, Massachusetts
- Coordinates: 41°50′44″N 70°41′36″W
- Basin countries: United States
- Surface area: 16 acres (6.5 ha)
- Average depth: 6 ft (1.8 m)
- Max. depth: 17 ft (5.2 m)

Barrett Pond is a 16-acre (65,000 m^{2}), warm water pond in the Myles Standish State Forest in Carver, Massachusetts, located less than ½ mile north of the forest headquarters, west of East Head Reservoir, and southwest of College Pond in Plymouth. The pond has an average depth of six feet and a maximum depth of 17 feet (5.2 m). Most of the shoreline is undeveloped except for a campground area on the eastern shore. Access is possible off Lower College Pond Road and is suitable only for car top boats or canoes, electric motors only.
