= Bloody Pond (Massachusetts) =

Pond in Plymouth, Massachusetts, United States

- Location within Massachusetts Location within the United States
- Location: Plymouth, Massachusetts
- Coordinates: 41°51′00″N 70°35′00″W
- Type: kettlehole
- Basin countries: United States
- Max. length: 0.71 miles (1.14 km)
- Max. width: 0.31 miles (0.50 km)
- Surface area: 98 acres (400,000 m^{2})
- Average depth: 17 ft (5.2 m)
- Max. depth: 38 ft (12 m)
- Settlements: Long Pond village

Bloody Pond is a 98-acre (400,000 m^{2}) natural kettlehole pond in Plymouth, Massachusetts, near Long Pond village. The pond is located southeast of Long Pond. This pond, visible from the southbound side of Route 3 past the Ship Pond Road bridge, is fed by groundwater and has over two miles (3 km) of shoreline. The average depth is 17 feet (5.2 m) and the maximum depth is 38 feet (12 m). Legal public access to the pond is obtained through a dirt road off of Long Pond Road and is suitable primarily for shore and wading fishermen as the access point is a long walk from a two-car parking lot in front of a gate.

The name "Bloody Pond" commemorates an Indian battle fought there.
