= Spectacle Pond (Sandwich, Massachusetts) =

Pond in Massachusetts, United States

- Location within Massachusetts Location within the United States
- Location: Sandwich, Massachusetts
- Coordinates: 41°42′10″N 70°27′30″W
- Type: kettle pond
- Basin countries: United States
- Surface area: 91 acres (37 ha)
- Max. depth: 43 feet (13 m)

Spectacle Pond is a 91-acre (370,000 m^{2}) kettle pond in Sandwich, Massachusetts. It has a small, forested island called Pinkham Island accessible by wading from its west shoreline.

The pond has been stocked for years by MassWildlife. As of 2018 it is being stocked spring and fall with trout. Access is provided by a town landing which consists of a rutted unimproved gravel ramp on the southwestern end of the pond, suitable for launching small boats and canoes. To reach the site take Quaker Meetinghouse Road to a right onto Pinkham Road. The access is at the end of a dirt road on the left (the first left after the entrance to Camp Hayward).

Spectacle Pond was sampled most recently on September 12, 1994, and seven species were collected: yellow perch, smallmouth bass, banded killifish, pumpkinseed sunfish, largemouth bass, brook trout and brown bullhead. In addition to brook trout, it is also stocked with rainbow trout and brown trout.
