= Charge Pond =

- Location within Massachusetts Location within the United States
- Location: Plymouth, Massachusetts
- Coordinates: 41°49′00″N 70°40′35″W
- Type: Lake
- Primary inflows: groundwater
- Primary outflows: Harlow Brook
- Basin countries: United States
- Surface area: 23 acres (9.3 ha)
- Average depth: 6 ft (1.8 m)
- Max. depth: 17 ft (5.2 m)
- Surface elevation: 66 ft (20 m)

Charge Pond is a 23-acre (93,000 m^{2}) warm water lake in Plymouth, Massachusetts. The lake has an average depth of 6 feet (1.8 m) and a maximum depth of 17 feet (5.2 m). It is located within a camping area in the southernmost section of Myles Standish State Forest, south of Fearing Pond, southwest of Abner Pond, and northwest of Little Long Pond. The lake is fed by groundwater and is the headwaters to Harlow Brook.
