= Bumps Pond =

Lake in Massachusetts, US

- Location within Massachusetts Location within the United States
- Location: Plymouth County, Massachusetts
- Coordinates: 41°51′4″N 70°39′32″W
- Type: pond
- Etymology: an early settler with the surname Bump or Bumpus

Bumps Pond is a lake in Plymouth County, in the U.S. state of Massachusetts.

Bumps Pond was named after an early settler with the surname Bump or Bumpus.
