= Sandy Pond (Wareham, Massachusetts) =

Pond in Massachusetts, United States

- Location within Massachusetts Location within the United States
- Location: Wareham, Massachusetts
- Coordinates: 41°46′20″N 70°39′17″W
- Basin countries: United States
- Surface area: 18 acres (7.3 ha)

Sandy Pond is an 18-acre (73,000 m^{2}) pond in Wareham, Massachusetts. The pond is located east of Spectacle Pond and Mill Pond, and south of Glen Charlie Pond.
