= Long Pond (Plymouth, Massachusetts) =

Pond in Massachusetts, United States

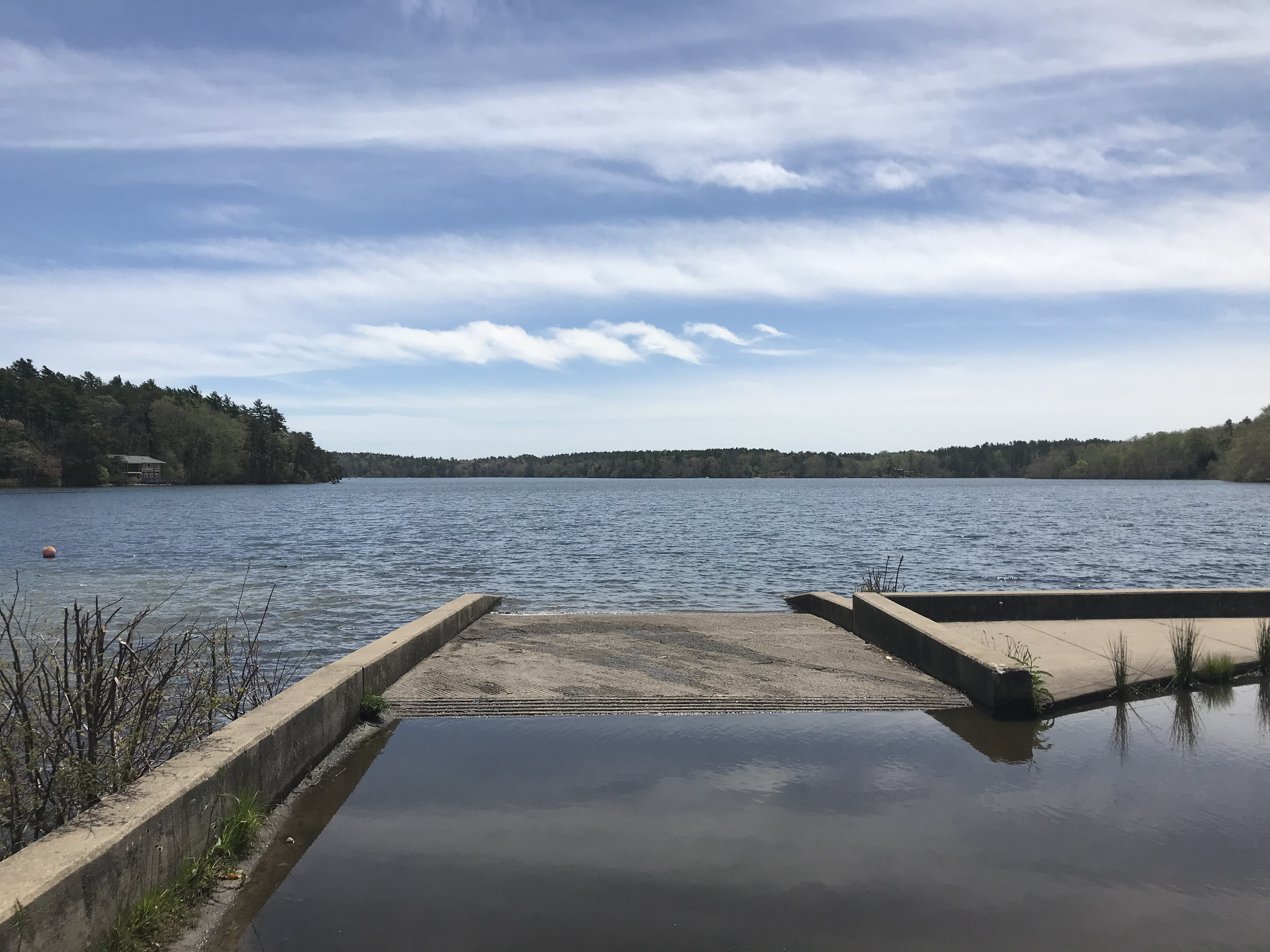
- The boat ramp

- Location within Massachusetts Location within the United States
- Location: Plymouth, Massachusetts
- Coordinates: 41°51′30″N 70°36′15″W
- Type: Pond
- Primary inflows: Little Long Pond and groundwater
- Primary outflows: Pond bottom
- Basin countries: United States
- Surface area: 211 acres (85 ha)
- Average depth: 46 ft (14 m)
- Max. depth: 100 ft (30 m)
- Settlements: Long Pond village

Long Pond is a 211-acre (0.85 km^{2}) cold water pond in Plymouth, Massachusetts, east of Myles Standish State Forest, Halfway Pond and Round Pond, west of Route 3 at Exit 3 and The Pinehills, northwest of Bloody Pond, and north of West Wind Shores. The pond has an average depth of 46 feet (14 m) and a maximum depth of 100 feet (30 m). It is fed by groundwater and an inlet from Little Long Pond, and drains through the pond bottom. A paved boat ramp provided by the Public Access Board with ample parking spaces is easily accessible from Route 3. The Pond has a 50 hp limitation on boating.

== Long Pond village ==
The village of the same name to the southwest of the pond includes Faunce Church 41°50′50″N 70°36′17″W.

== See also ==
- Neighborhoods in Plymouth, Massachusetts
- Plymouth, Massachusetts
