= Spectacle Pond (Wareham, Massachusetts) =

Lake in the United States of America

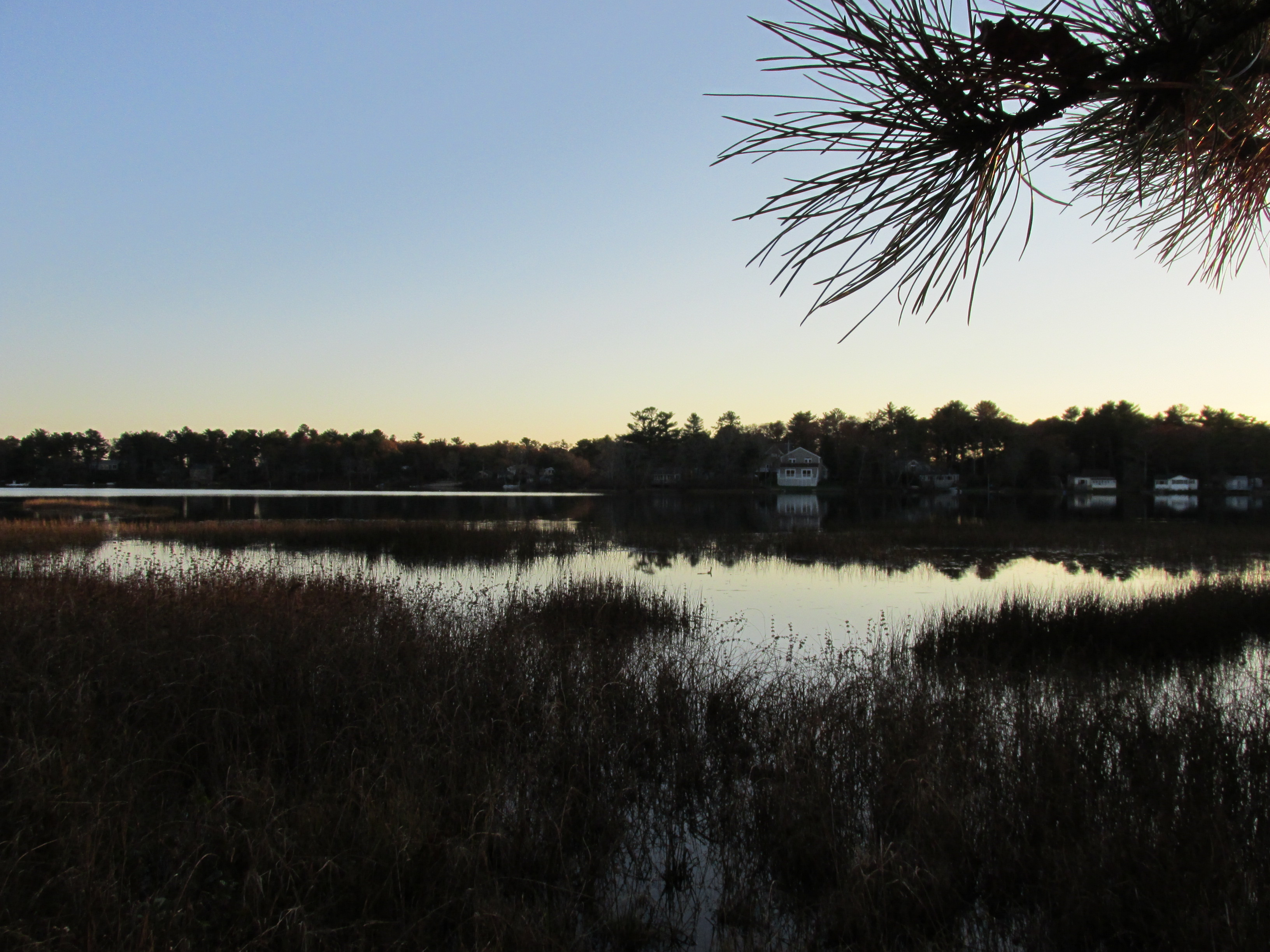
- Spectacle Pond

- Location within Massachusetts Location within the United States
- Location: Wareham, Massachusetts
- Coordinates: 41°46′07″N 70°39′53″W
- Primary outflows: stream that flows into the Agawam River
- Basin countries: United States
- Surface area: 42 acres (17 ha)

Spectacle Pond is a 42-acre (170,000 m^{2}) pond in Wareham, Massachusetts. It is located east and south of Mill Pond, west of Sandy Pond and southwest of Glen Charlie Pond. A small stream connects it to the Agawam River.
