= White Island (Philippines) =

Island in Philippines

Medan Island
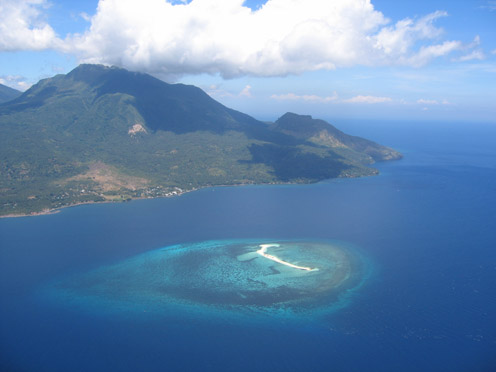
- White Island with Hibok-Hibok Volcano and Mt. Vulcan in the background

- Location within Philippines

Geography
- Coordinates: 9°15′28″N 124°39′21″E
- Adjacent to: Bohol Sea
- Length: 700 m (2300 ft) - Variable
- Highest point: Negligible, island is flat

Administration
- Philippines
- Region: Northern Mindanao
- Province: Camiguin
- Municipality: Mambajao

Demographics
- Population: uninhabited

White Island is an uninhabited white sandbar located about 1.4 kilometres (0.87 mi) off the northern shore of Mambajao in the volcanic island of Camiguin in the Philippines. The island is generally horseshoe shaped, although the tides constantly resize and reshape its exact form. There are no trees or shelter of any kind, and it is composed solely of white sands.

== Accessibility ==
White Island attracts thousands of tourists every year. The island can be accessed from Barangay Agoho or Brgy. Yumbing in Mambajao about 4 to 6 kilometres (2.5 to 3.7 mi) west of the poblacion or town center. Small boats can be hired from any of the beachfront resorts that face the island.

== Gallery ==
Hibok-hibok Volcano and Mt. Vulcan in the background as seen from White Island

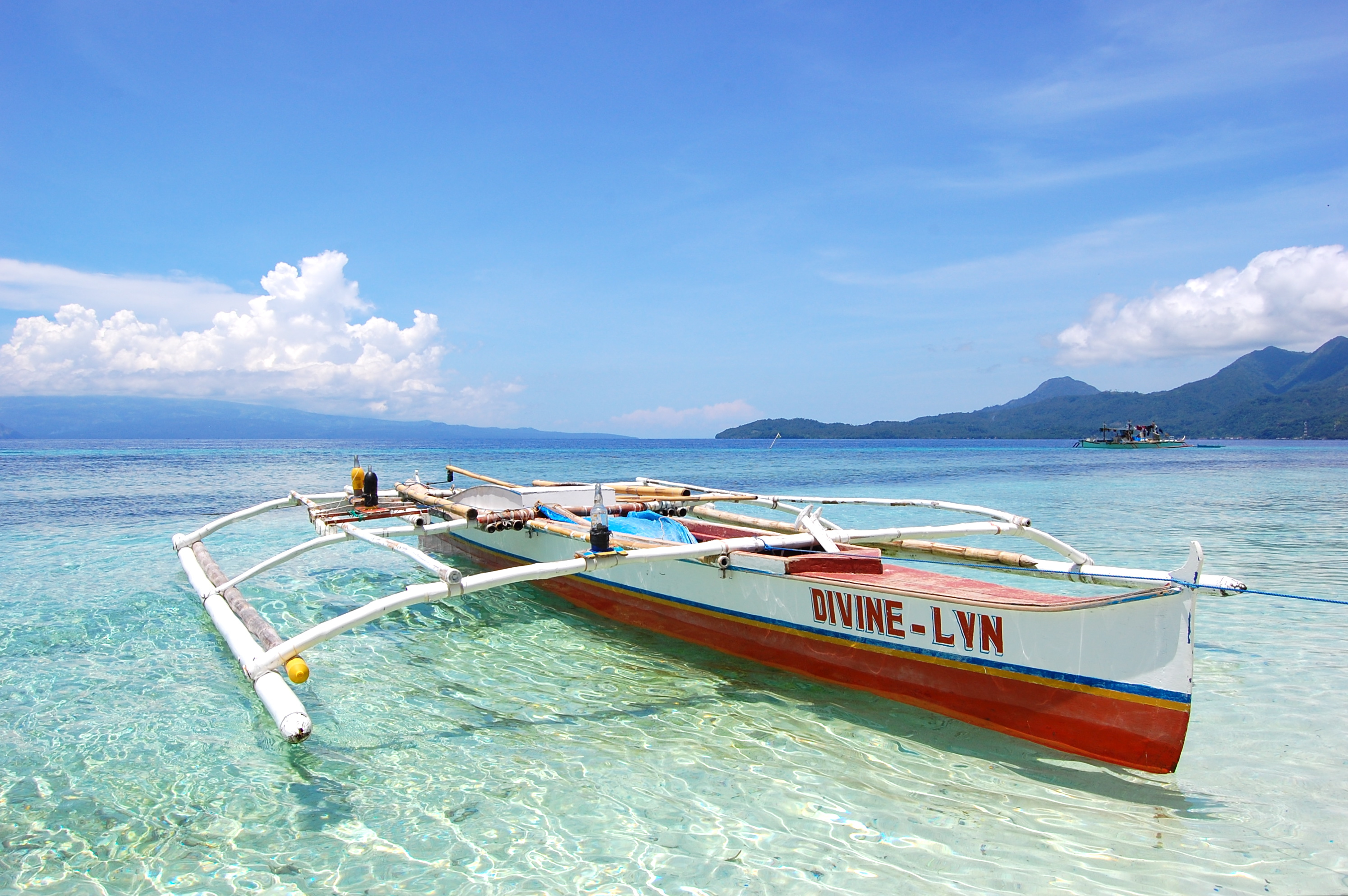
An outrigger canoe over the clear waters of White Island

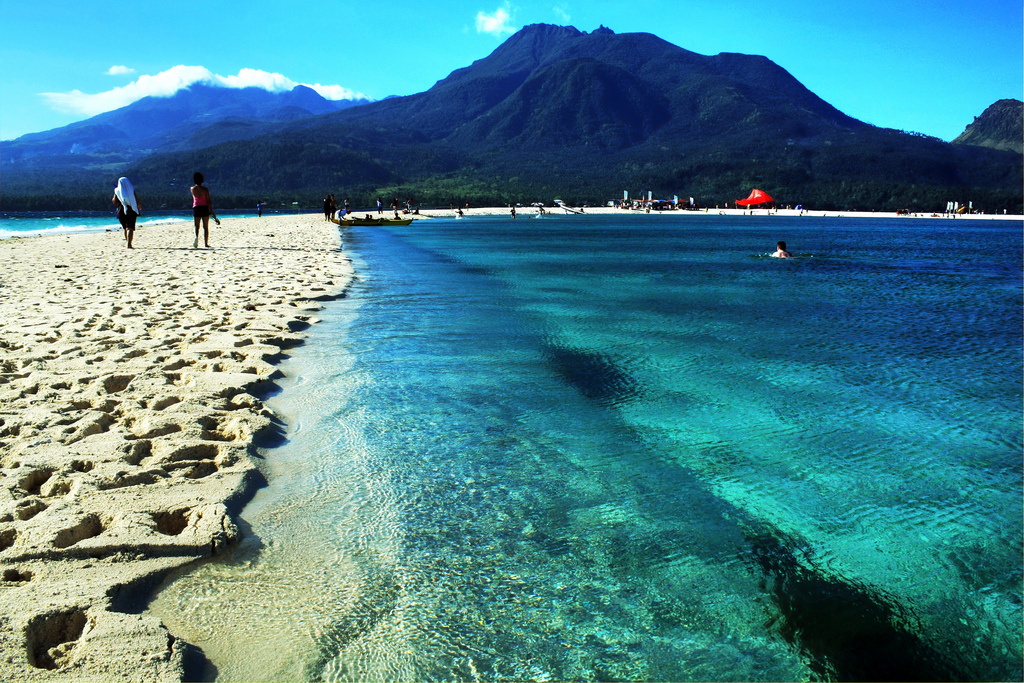
White Island coastline

== See also ==
- List of islands of the Philippines
- List of islands
- Desert island
