= White Island Shores, Massachusetts =

- Census-designated place
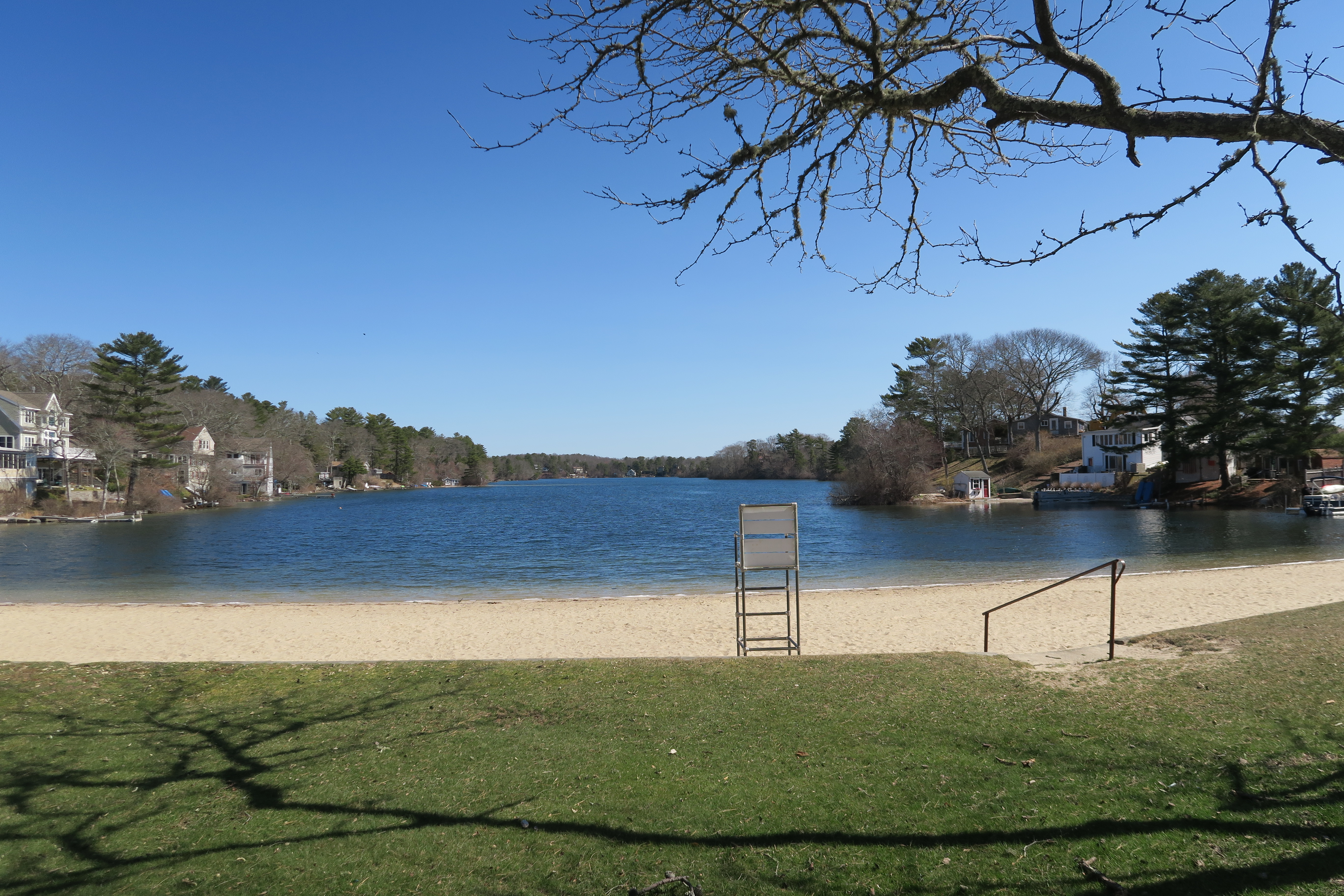
- White Island Pond

- Location in Plymouth County in Massachusetts
- Coordinates: 41°47′38″N 70°38′19″W
- Country: United States
- State: Massachusetts
- County: Plymouth
- Town: Wareham

Area
  - Total: 1.30 sq mi (3.37 km^{2})
  - Land: 1.16 sq mi (3.00 km^{2})
  - Water: 0.14 sq mi (0.37 km^{2})
- Elevation: 82 ft (25 m)

Population (2020)
  - Total: 2,180
  - Density: 1,882.9/sq mi (726.98/km^{2})
- Time zone: UTC-5 (Eastern (EST))
  - Summer (DST): UTC-4 (EDT)
- ZIP Code: 02538 (East Wareham)
- FIPS code: 25-79390
- GNIS feature ID: 0615470

White Island Shores is a census-designated place (CDP) in the town of Wareham in Plymouth County, Massachusetts, United States, along the shores of White Island Pond. As of the 2020 census, White Island Shores had a population of 2,180.

== Geography ==
White Island Shores is located at 41°47′38″N 70°38′19″W (41.793928, -70.638531).

According to the United States Census Bureau, the CDP has a total area of 3.4 km^{2} (1.3 mi^{2}), of which 3.0 km^{2} (1.2 mi^{2}) is land and 0.4 km^{2} (0.2 mi^{2}) (11.36%) is water.

White Island Shores is also near a new, A.D Makepeace, development, Redbrook. Redbrook is home to the Old Colony YMCA, retail spaces, healthcare buildings, apartments, and many single family homes.

== Demographics ==
Historical population
Census	Pop.	Note	%±
2020	2,180		—
U.S. Decennial Census

=== 2020 census ===
As of the 2020 census, White Island Shores had a population of 2,180. The median age was 39.7 years. 18.0% of residents were under the age of 18 and 16.4% of residents were 65 years of age or older. For every 100 females there were 99.8 males, and for every 100 females age 18 and over there were 99.9 males age 18 and over.

95.1% of residents lived in urban areas, while 4.9% lived in rural areas.

There were 808 households in White Island Shores, of which 25.5% had children under the age of 18 living in them. Of all households, 44.7% were married-couple households, 21.8% were households with a male householder and no spouse or partner present, and 22.4% were households with a female householder and no spouse or partner present. About 26.6% of all households were made up of individuals and 8.4% had someone living alone who was 65 years of age or older.

There were 950 housing units, of which 14.9% were vacant. The homeowner vacancy rate was 0.0% and the rental vacancy rate was 9.3%.

Racial composition as of the 2020 census
Race	Number	Percent
White	1,836	84.2%
Black or African American	36	1.7%
American Indian and Alaska Native	6	0.3%
Asian	19	0.9%
Native Hawaiian and Other Pacific Islander	2	0.1%
Some other race	57	2.6%
Two or more races	224	10.3%
Hispanic or Latino (of any race)	96	4.4%

=== 2000 census ===
As of the 2000 census, there were 2,133 people, 722 households, and 547 families residing in the CDP. The population density was 703.9/km^{2} (1,818.5/mi^{2}). There were 876 housing units at an average density of 289.1/km^{2} (746.9/mi^{2}). The racial makeup of the CDP was 89.64% White, 2.91% African American, 0.84% Native American, 0.23% Asian, 0.14% Pacific Islander, 3.19% from other races, and 3.05% from two or more races. Hispanic or Latino of any race were 2.25% of the population.

There were 722 households, out of which 45.6% had children under the age of 18 living with them, 52.9% were married couples living together, 17.2% had a female householder with no husband present, and 24.1% were non-families. 18.0% of all households were made up of individuals, and 6.6% had someone living alone who was 65 years of age or older. The average household size was 2.95 and the average family size was 3.33.

In the CDP, the population was spread out, with 33.7% under the age of 18, 8.2% from 18 to 24, 32.1% from 25 to 44, 19.9% from 45 to 64, and 6.2% who were 65 years of age or older. The median age was 32 years. For every 100 females, there were 97.9 males. For every 100 females age 18 and over, there were 93.7 males.

=== Income and poverty ===
The median income for a household in the CDP was $43,092, and the median income for a family was $43,191. Males had a median income of $36,399 versus $23,953 for females. The per capita income for the CDP was $18,722. About 5.5% of families and 5.4% of the population were below the poverty line, including 3.4% of those under age 18 and 21.8% of those age 65 or over.

== See also ==
- Neighborhoods in Plymouth, Massachusetts
