= Agawam River =

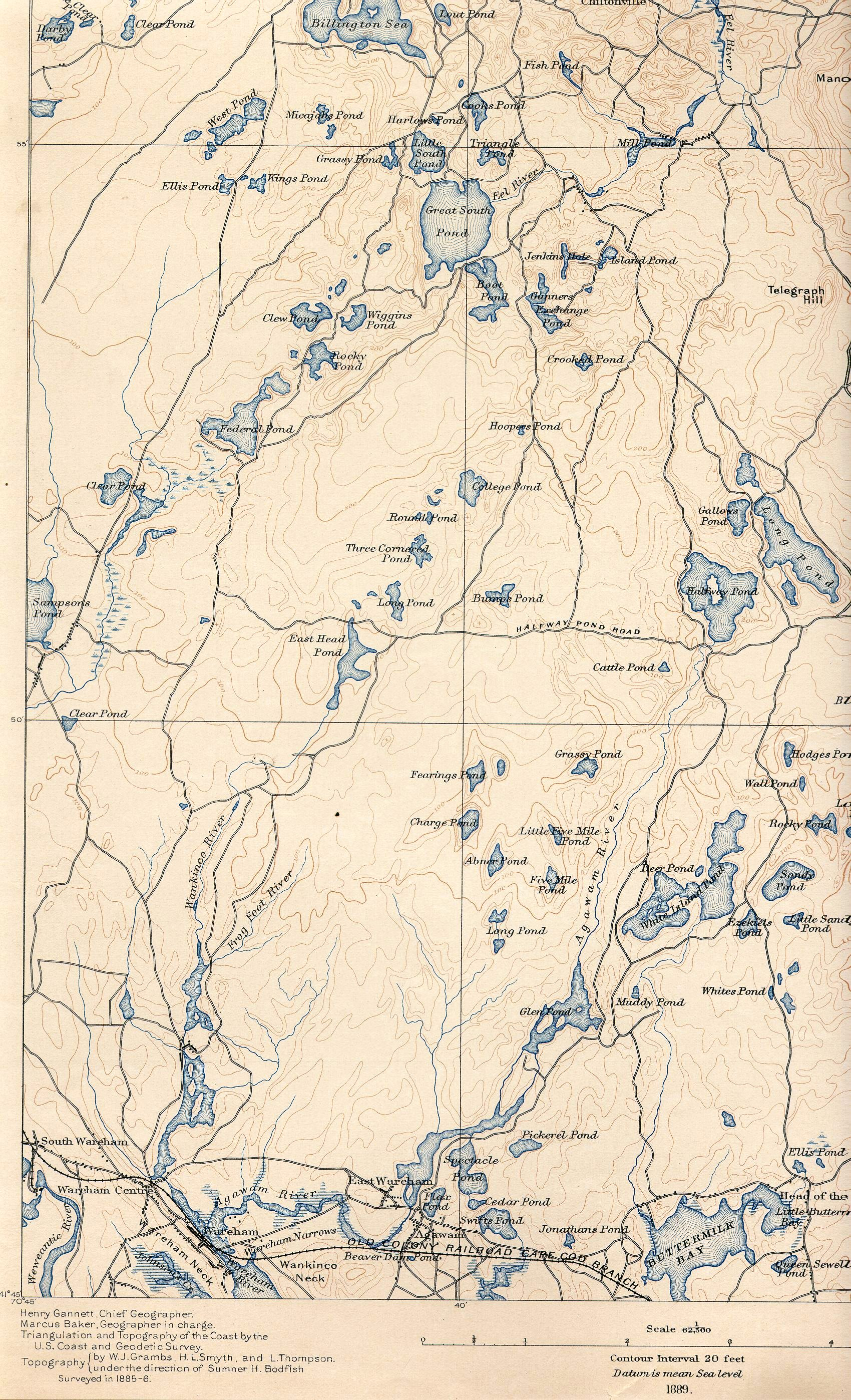
- Agawam River and environs

- Location of mouth

Location
- Country: United States
- State: Massachusetts

Physical characteristics
- Mouth
  - coordinates: 41°45′33″N 70°40′45″W
- Length: 10.7 mi (17.2 km)

Basin features
- River system: Wareham River

The Agawam River is a 10.7-mile-long (17.2 km) stream in southeastern Massachusetts, USA, that is part of the Wareham River estuary watershed. The Agawam River is named in honor of the peaceful Native Americans that helped the Massachusetts Bay Colony establish its first Connecticut River Valley settlement at Springfield, Massachusetts in 1636, and helped it to flourish while many of the Connecticut Colony settlements south of Springfield were attacked or destroyed by more war-like Native American tribes.

The Agawam River originates at Halfway Pond, east of the Myles Standish State Forest in Plymouth, flows southwest through Glen Charlie Pond and East Wareham, and drains into the Wareham River near the center of Wareham. As the estuary's major contributor of nutrients and fresh water, the Agawam was one of the most important herring rivers in Massachusetts. Its herring runs have been operated by European settlers since 1632 and were officially established as a managed run in 1832.

Even today, it remains one of the few managed herring runs in Massachusetts, although few fish reach the river's spawning and nursery habitat. It includes 570 acres (2.3 km^{2}) of water bodies that could serve as habitat to alewife, blueback herring, and American shad. Approximately 36% of this habitat is in Halfway Pond. Fishway retrofit projects aim to restore river herring population to historic levels, perhaps as many as 100,000+ fish annually.

The Agawam River receives discharges from the Wareham Sewage Treatment plant, which discharges 0.76 million US gallons (2,900 m^{3}) per day of nitrogen-rich sewage effluent.
