= Myles Standish State Forest =

Protected area in Massachusetts, United States

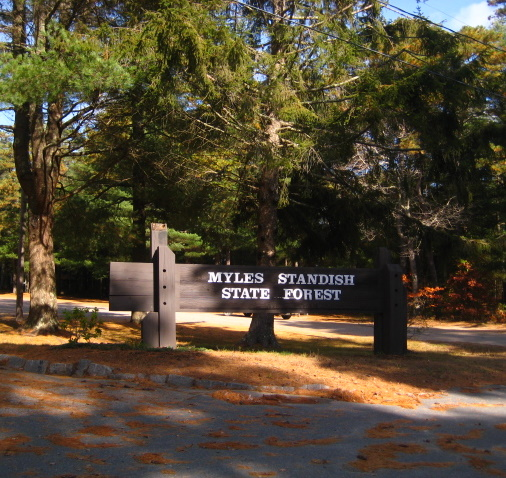

- Location within Massachusetts Location within the United States
- Location: Carver and Plymouth, Massachusetts, United States
- Coordinates: 41°52′04″N 70°39′49″W
- Area: 12,029 acres (4,868 ha)
- Elevation: 102 ft (31 m)
- Established: 1916
- Named for: Myles Standish
- Administrator: Massachusetts Department of Conservation and Recreation
- Website: Official website

Myles Standish State Forest is a state forest located in the towns of Plymouth and Carver in southeastern Massachusetts, approximately 45 miles (72 km) south of Boston. It is the largest publicly owned recreation area in this part of Massachusetts and is managed by the Department of Conservation and Recreation.

== Description ==
The forest is part of the Atlantic coastal pine barrens ecoregion and consists largely of pitch pine and scrub oak forests—at 26 square miles (67 km^{2}), one of the largest such forests north of Long Island. The forest surrounds 16 lakes and ponds, including several ecologically significant coastal kettle ponds.

== Ecology ==
Species commonly found in Southeast Massachusetts pine barrens:

=== Plants ===
==== Trees ====
- Pitch pine
- Bear oak (scrub oak)
- Dwarf chestnut oak (scrub oak)

==== Fruit-bearing ====
- Hillside and lowbush blueberry
- Black huckleberry
- Bearberry
- Birds'-foot violet

=== Animals ===
==== Birds ====
- Eastern towhee
- Eastern bluebird
- Pine warbler
- Prairie warbler
- Whip-poor-will

==== Insects ====
- Persius duskywing (endangered)
- Frosted elfin
- Slender clearwing sphinx moth
- Barrens buck moth
- Melsheimer's sack-bearing moth
- Gerhard's underwing moth
- Barrens tiger beetle (endangered)
- Antlion

==== Reptiles ====
- Northern red-bellied cooter
- Eastern box turtle
- Eastern hognose snake

==== Mammals ====
- Fisher
- Deer
- Coyote

== Activities and amenities ==
Recreational uses include swimming, hunting, fishing, kayaking, canoeing, and picnicking. Day-use areas are found at College Pond and Fearing Pond. Hunting is allowed during the season, and two Wildlife Management Areas within the forest are stocked with game birds in October and November. In the summer, the park offers interpretive programs, such as pond shore walks and cranberry bog explorations.

=== Trails ===
The forest offers fifteen miles (24 km) of paved bicycle trails, thirty-five miles (56 km) of horse trails, and thirteen miles (21 km) of hiking trails. The "Bicycle Trails of Carver" were included in the Massachusetts Department of Travel and Tourism's list of 1000 great places in Massachusetts. Some popular trails in the park include Bentley Loop Trail, East Head Reservoir Trail, Friends' Trail, Charge Pond Loop Trail, Frost Pocket Loop Trail and Pine Barren's Trail.

=== Camping ===
Camping is offered at five sites, four of which are located at ponds: Curlew Pond, Fearing Pond, Charge Pond, Barrett Pond. A portion of the Charge Pond area is set aside for equestrian camping.

=== Ponds ===
The following table lists the ponds and recreational activities available at each in Myles Standish State Forest.

Pond name	Size (acres)	Maximum depth (feet)	Location in forest	Swimming	Fishing	Boating	Remarks
Barrett	16	17	Southwest	Check mark	Check mark	Check mark	
Bumps	20	4	East	No access	No access	No access	
Charge	23	17	South	Check mark	Check mark	Check mark	
Cherry	2	-	North-central	LA	LA	LA	
College	53	24	Central	Check mark	Check mark	Check mark	
Curlew	43	31	Northwest	Check mark	Check mark	Check mark	Part of the pond is privately owned land.
Doctors	2	3	Southeast	NFA	NFA	NFA	
East Head Reservoir	86	10	Southwest	NP	Boat only	Check mark	Owned by the Davison Partners. Property line is six rods (99 feet) from high-water mark.
Fearing	24	20	South-central	Check mark	Check mark	Check mark	
Grassy	3	-	Southeast	NP	NP	NP	
Hooper	3	-	North-central	NP	NP	NP	
Little College	3	-	North-central	NFA	NFA	NFA	
Little Widgeon	7	5	Northwest	LA	LA	LA	
Manters Hole	2	-	Northwest	NP	NP	NP	
New Grassy	6	4	Southeast	LA	Check mark	LA	
New Long	23	6	Central	NFA	Check mark	Check mark	
Rocky	20	19	Northwest	NFA	Check mark	Check mark	
Round	10	12	Central	LA	LA	LA	
Three Cornered	14	4	Central	LA	LA	LA	Located northeast of New Long Pond and southwest of College Pond; water quality impaired due to non-native aquatic plants.
Torrey	3	4	Central	NP	NP	NP	
Widgeon	24	12	Northwest	NFA	Check mark	Check mark	

= FORMAL ACCESS is available for recreational activity.
NFA = Recreational activity is permitted, but NO FORMAL ACCESS is available.
LA = LIMITED ACCESS for low impact recreational use is permitted, sensitive pond shore habitat.
NP = Recreational access NOT PERMITTED, habitat protection area.

=== Scouting ===
Cachalot Scout Reservation, a Boy Scout camp, encompasses 880 acres (360 ha) surrounding Five Mile Pond adjacent to Myles Standish State Forest. Camp Squanto is also located within Myles Standish State Forest as is Camp Wind-in-the-Pines, a girl scout camp.

=== Prison ===
A state correctional facility, MCI - Plymouth, is also located in Myles Standish State Forest.

== Incidents ==
On May 14, 1977, according to the Plymouth Police Department records, Eric H. Anderson Jr. murdered Ruth Masters (née Ruth Rydberg), a teacher in nearby Hanson, Massachusetts, while she was riding her bike alone on an isolated trail in the park. He was later found guilty and sentenced to life imprisonment in Maine State Prison in Warren, Maine.
