= Island Lake =

Island Lake may refer to:

== Lakes ==
- Island Lake (Antarctica)

=== Canada ===
- Island Lake (Alberta)
- Island Lake (Manitoba)
- Big Island Lake (Manitoba)
- Island Lake (Saskatchewan)

=== United States ===
- Island Lake (Idaho), in the Sawtooth Wilderness
- Island Lake (White Cloud Mountains), in Custer County, Idaho
- Island Lake (Illinois)
- Island Lake (Aitkin County, Minnesota)
- Island Lake (Beltrami County, Minnesota)
- Island Lake (Lyon County, Minnesota), Lyon County, Minnesota
- Island Lake (Nevada)
- Island Lake (Oregon)
- Island Lake (Kitsap County, Washington)

== Places ==
=== Canada ===
- Island Lake, Algoma District, a community and settlement in northeast Ontario
- Island Lake, Manitoba, a community in Manitoba
- Island Lake, Sudbury District, a community and settlement in northeast Ontario, located near Chapleau
- Island Lakes, Winnipeg
- Island Lake First Nation, an Indian reserve in Saskatchewan

=== United States ===
- Island Lake, Illinois, a village in the northwest Chicago suburbs
- Island Lake, Beltrami County, Minnesota
- Island Lake, St. Louis County, Minnesota, an unincorporated community near the city of Duluth
- Island Lake Township, Lyon County, Minnesota, a township in southwest Minnesota
- Island Lake Township, Mahnomen County, Minnesota, a township in northwest Minnesota
- Island Lake, Wisconsin, an unincorporated community near Ladysmith

== See also ==
- Island Pond (disambiguation)
- Island Lakes in the Alpine Lakes Wilderness of Washington State
