= Triangle Pond (Massachusetts) =

Lake of the United States of America

- Location within Massachusetts Location within the United States
- Location: Plymouth, Massachusetts
- Coordinates: 41°49′10″N 70°34′33″W
- Basin countries: United States
- Surface area: 10 acres (4.0 ha)
- Settlements: Cedarville

Triangle Pond is a 10-acre (40,000 m^{2}) pond in the Cedarville section of Plymouth, Massachusetts. The pond is located northwest of Great Herring Pond, north of Island Pond, southwest of Little Herring Pond, and east of Long Duck Pond. The pond has recently become popular on social media for its shape, as despite its name, it does not resemble a triangle. There are 4 other ponds in Massachusetts named Triangle Pond, including North Triangle Pond and South Triangle Pond.
