= Intersection for the Arts =

Non-profit art space in San Francisco, U.S.

Coordinates: 37.765769°N 122.422119°W

- Established: 1965
- Location: 1446 Market St, San Francisco, California U.S.
- Director: Allison Snopek and Scott Nielsen
- Website: www.theintersection.org

Intersection for the Arts, established in 1965, is the oldest alternative non-profit art space in San Francisco, California. Intersection's reading series is the longest continuous reading series outside of an academic institution in the state of California.

Intersection produces and presents new and experimental work in the fields of literature, theater, music, and the visual arts. Intersection's artists regularly provide classes and workshops to the local community. Intersection also maintains an incubation program for emerging literary, visual and performing arts groups.

Intersection is located in the SoMa district of San Francisco, on 925 Mission Street, between 5th and 6th Streets.

== History ==
Intersection was founded in the Tenderloin in 1965 by an interfaith coalition of three churches. It was originally called "Intersection: Center for Religion and the Arts". The organization began as a merger of several faith-based experiments that were using art to reach disenfranchised neighborhood youth while also providing artists who were conscientious objectors with an alternative to serving in the Vietnam War. The founding Director was Laird Sutton and full-time staff members were poetry director Adrian Ravarour, Tom Dobson, Paul Donetti, and Juan Elorreaga. By 1967, it moved to 756 Union Street and remained in North Beach for 20 years. Robin Williams, Father Guido Sarducci (Don Novello), Whoopi Goldberg, Peter Coyote, Bill Irwin and Country Joe McDonald performed there. Gregory Corso, William S. Burroughs, Gary Snyder, Lawrence Ferlinghetti, Ishmael Reed and Margaret Atwood read there.

In 1985 it lost its North Beach space and a year later, relocated to 766 Valencia Street in the Mission District, moving again in 1989, to a former furniture store on Valencia Street. Campo Santo Theatre Company, Joe Goode and Erika Chong Shuch, Elbows Akimbo, and Marcus Shelby performed there. Denis Johnson and Dave Eggers read there.

Then it relocated to 925 Mission Street, Suite 109, a 5M space in The Chronicle building at Fifth Street and Mission Street.

Over the years, Intersection has evolved into a more diverse organization with a more prominent profile, but maintains strong ties with the local community.

Intersection has worked with a range of artists including Whoopi Goldberg, Michael Ondaatje, David Henry Hwang, Carolyn Forché, and Ishmael Reed. Recently, it has developed and presented work with Jessica Hagedorn, Alice Walker, bell hooks, John Trudell, Denis Johnson, Lebbeus Woods, Mike Davis, Dave Eggers, Jimmy Santiago Baca, Stefon Harris, Naomi Iizuka, Claudia Bernardi, Joe Goode, and Gary Snyder, as well as thousands of emerging artists.

== Intersection today ==
Intersection for the Arts produces anywhere from 6-11 theatrical and dance productions, 10-12 literary readings, 12-16 concerts, and 4-6 art exhibits or installations in a given year, as well as workshops in each discipline taught by the resident artists. Intersection's building also hosts a variety of community, social, and artistic events for other San Francisco artistic organizations throughout the year, including the Litquake Festival, the Jackson Award, and the Phelan Award.

Intersection for the Arts's resident artists include the theater company Campo Santo (Margo Hall, Sean San Jose, Luis Saguar, Michael Torres - Founders. Denis Johnson - Resident Playwright), Erika Chong Shuch and her dance-theater company the Erika Shuch Performance (ESP) Project, the jazz musician Howard Wiley, Marc Bamuthi Joseph and Youth Speak's theater program The Living Word Project, and photographer Scott Chernis.

== Literary series ==
Outside of academic institutions, Intersection for the Arts' literary series is the longest continual reading series in the state of California. The longevity of the series has attracted an increasing number of high-profile writers, but the series continues to regularly showcase the work of emerging, local writers in the San Francisco Bay Area.

In recent years, Intersection has complemented their literary series with the Independent Press Spotlight series, hosting talks with members of San Francisco independent publishers and literary magazines scene while authors perform readings from recent issues. Participants in this series include AK Press, The Believer, City Lights Publishers, ColorLines Magazine, Fourteen Hills, Heyday Books, LiP Magazine, Manic D Press, McSweeney’s, Mercury House, New American Writing, Switchback, Tachyon Publications, University of California Press, Zoetrope: All-Story, and ZYZZYVA as well as newer magazines, journals, and publishers.

== Intersection incubator ==
In addition to producing its own work, Intersection for the Arts provides members of its incubation program assistance in funding, developing, and promoting their artists' work. Through fiscal sponsorship, the program has encouraged funding agencies and contributors to take risks in funding new projects and emerging artists by ensuring that the funds will be well managed and spent according to the funder's guidelines.

Currently the Intersection Incubator provides support to more than 120 art projects and organizations in the San Francisco Bay Area across numerous disciplines and levels of experience. Several organizations that have been in the incubation program have gone on to have lasting impact in the San Francisco Bay Area, including Youth Speaks, Flyaway Productions, The Traveling Jewish Theater, and Galería de la Raza.
