= Little South Pond =

- Location within Massachusetts Location within the United States
- Location: Plymouth, Massachusetts
- Coordinates: 41°54′55″N 70°40′30″W
- Type: reservoir
- Basin countries: United States
- Surface area: 62 acres (25 ha)
- Surface elevation: 98 ft (30 m)

Little South Pond is a 62-acre (250,000 m^{2}) reservoir in Plymouth, Massachusetts. The pond is within the Eel River watershed, located west of South Pond village, northwest of Great South Pond, and south of Billington Sea. The pond serves as the primary municipal water supply for the Town of Plymouth.
