= Forge Pond (Plymouth, Massachusetts) =

Lake of the United States of America

- Location within Massachusetts Location within the United States
- Location: Plymouth, Massachusetts
- Coordinates: 41°55′05″N 70°36′40″W
- Primary inflows: Shingle Brook
- Primary outflows: Shingle Brook
- Basin countries: United States
- Surface area: 14 acres (5.7 ha)
- Settlements: Chiltonville

Forge Pond is a 14-acre (57,000 m^{2}) pond in the Chiltonville section of Plymouth, Massachusetts, within the Eel River watershed. The pond's inflow and outflow is Shingle Brook, a tributary of the Eel River.
