= Elbow Pond =

Elbow Pond may refer to:

- Elbow Pond (Plymouth, Massachusetts), USA
- Elbow Pond (New York), USA

== See also ==
- Elbow Lake (disambiguation)
- Elbow (disambiguation)
