= Island Lake Township, Minnesota =

Island Lake Township is the name of some places in the U.S. state of Minnesota:

- Island Lake Township, Lyon County, Minnesota
- Island Lake Township, Mahnomen County, Minnesota
