= Great South Pond =

United States reservoir

- Location within Massachusetts
- Location: Plymouth, Massachusetts
- Coordinates: 41°54′20″N 70°40′15″W
- Basin countries: United States
- Surface area: 292 acres (118 ha)
- Settlements: South Pond

Great South Pond is a 292-acre (1.2 km^{2}) reservoir in Plymouth, Massachusetts, in South Pond village. The pond is within the Eel River watershed, located southeast of Little South Pond, west of South Triangle Pond, and north of Boot Pond. The pond serves as a secondary municipal water supply for the Town of Plymouth.
