= Island Pond (disambiguation) =

Island Pond is a village in the town of Brighton, Vermont, United States.

Island Pond may also refer to:

- Island Pond (Cedarville, Massachusetts)
- Island Pond (Plymouth, Massachusetts), in South Pond
- Island Pond, also known as Great Island Pond, in The Pinehills, Plymouth, Massachusetts
- Island Pond (Rockingham County, New Hampshire)
- Island Pond (Stoddard, New Hampshire)
- Island Pond (New York)

== See also ==
- Island Creek Pond, in Duxbury, Massachusetts
- Island Lake (disambiguation)
