= Elbow Lake =

Elbow Lake may refer to:

== Settlements ==
- Elbow Lake, Saskatchewan, Canada
- Elbow Lake, Becker County, Minnesota, U.S.
- Elbow Lake, Grant County, Minnesota, U.S.
- Elbow Lake Township, Grant County, Minnesota, U.S.

== Lakes ==
- Elbow Lake (Alberta), Canada
- Elbow Lake (Grant County, Minnesota), U.S.
- Elbow Lake (Thurston County, Washington), U.S.
- Elbow Lake (Saskatchewan), Canada

== Other uses ==
- Elbow Lake Subdivision, a railway line from Glenwood, Minnesota to Enderlin, North Dakota, U.S.

== See also ==
- Ellbogensee, a lake in Mecklenburg-Vorpommern, Germany
- Elbow Pond (disambiguation)
- Elbow (disambiguation)
