= Island Pond (Cedarville, Massachusetts) =

- Location within Massachusetts Location within the United States
- Location: Plymouth, Massachusetts
- Coordinates: 41°48′40″N 70°34′35″W
- Type: natural freshwater lake
- Basin countries: United States
- Max. length: 2,300 feet (700 m)
- Max. width: 2,050 feet (620 m)
- Surface area: 77 acres (31 ha)
- Surface elevation: 39 feet (12 m)
- Islands: 1
- Settlements: Cedarville

Island Pond is a 77-acre (310,000 m^{2}) pond in the Cedarville section of Plymouth, Massachusetts, one of three ponds named Island Pond within the town (one is located near South Pond village, and the other is located in The Pinehills development, better known as Great Island Pond). The pond is located northwest of Great Herring Pond, north of Elbow Pond, southwest of Little Herring Pond, and south of Triangle Pond.
