= Rocky Pond =

Natural pond in Plymouth, Massachusetts

- Location within Massachusetts
- Location: Plymouth, Massachusetts
- Coordinates: 41°53′09″N 70°41′42″W
- Basin countries: United States
- Surface area: 18 acres (7.3 ha)

Rocky Pond is an 18-acre (73,000 m^{2}) pond in the Myles Standish State Forest in Plymouth, Massachusetts. The pond is located south of Curlew Pond.

There is another Rocky Pond, which is better known as Big Rocky Pond, within Plymouth's borders in the West Wind Shores neighborhood.
