= Black Jimmy Pond =

Pond in Massachusetts, United States

- Hyles Pond
- Location within Massachusetts
- Location: Plymouth, Massachusetts
- Coordinates: 41°49′46″N 70°34′10″W
- Basin countries: United States
- Surface area: 9 acres (3.6 ha)
- Settlements: Cedarville

Black Jimmy Pond, also known as Hyles Pond, is an 9-acre (36,000 m^{2}) pond in the Cedarville section of Plymouth, Massachusetts. The pond is located northwest of Hedges Pond and northeast of Little Herring Pond.

In 2021, a 3-year-old toddler went into pond, became unconscious, and then was airlifted to Boston Children's Hospital.
