= Long Duck Pond =

Lake of the United States of America

- Location within Massachusetts
- Location: Plymouth, Massachusetts
- Coordinates: 41°49′20″N 70°35′33″W
- Basin countries: United States
- Surface area: 23 acres (9.3 ha)
- Settlements: West Wind Shores

Long Duck Pond is a 23-acre (93,000 m^{2}) pond in the West Wind Shores neighborhood of Plymouth, Massachusetts. The pond is located east of Big Rocky Pond and west of Little Herring Pond and Triangle Pond. The water quality is impaired due to non-native aquatic plants.
