= Russell Millpond =

Lake of the United States of America

- Location within Massachusetts
- Location: Plymouth, Massachusetts
- Coordinates: 41°55′00″N 70°37′36″W
- Type: Pond
- Primary outflows: Eel River
- Basin countries: United States
- Surface area: 42 acres (17 ha)
- Settlements: Chiltonville

Russell Millpond, also known as Russell Mill Pond, is a 42-acre (170,000 m^{2}) pond in the Chiltonville village of Plymouth, Massachusetts, United States. Fed by springs and water from cranberry bogs, the outflow of the pond is the Eel River. The water quality is impaired due to non-native aquatic plants in the pond.
