= Elbow (disambiguation) =

The elbow is a joint of an arm.

Elbow may also refer to:

== Places ==
- Elbow (lunar crater)
- Elbow Lake (disambiguation)
- Elbow Pond (disambiguation)

Canada

- Elbow, Saskatchewan; a village
- Elbow River, Alberta; a river

United States

- Elbow, Illinois; an unincorporated community
- Elbow, Texas; an unincorporated community
- The Elbow (reef), Florida Keys, Florida; a coral reef

== People, characters, figures ==
- Elbow witch, a figure in Ojibwa folklore
- Peter Elbow (1935–2025), American academic
- "Mr. Elbows", a nickname carried by Canadian ice hockey player Gordie Howe (1928–2016)
- Elbow, a character in William Shakespeare's Measure for Measure

== Groups, organizations ==
- Elbow, an English rock band
- Elbow Jane, an English acoustic band from Merseyside
- Elbows Akimbo, former theater group in San Francisco, California, US

== Devices ==
- Elbow macaroni, a food item, a type of pasta
- Elbow (knot)
- Elbow fitting, a type of pipe fitting
  - Street elbow, a variant of the elbow pipe fitting

== Music ==
- "Elbow", a song by King Gizzard & the Lizard Wizard
- "Elbows", a song by Jay Rock from the album Follow Me Home

== Other ==
- Elbow (strike), an attack using the elbow
- Elbow of a curve
  - Elbow method (clustering)
- Elbow, a location in the key in the sport of basketball
