= Pine Bend, Minnesota =

Census-designated place in Minnesota, US

- Census-designated place
- Location within Minnesota Location within the United States
- Coordinates: 47°25′20″N 95°35′53″W
- Country: United States
- State: Minnesota
- County: Mahnomen
- Township: Island Lake

Area
  - Total: 1.26 sq mi (3.27 km^{2})
  - Land: 1.25 sq mi (3.25 km^{2})
  - Water: 0.0039 sq mi (0.01 km^{2})
- Elevation: 1,473 ft (449 m)

Population (2020)
  - Total: 31
  - Density: 24.7/sq mi (9.53/km^{2})
- Time zone: UTC-6 (Central (CST))
  - Summer (DST): UTC-5 (CDT)
- ZIP Code: 56651 (Lengby)
- Area code: 218
- GNIS feature ID: 2583778
- FIPS code: 27-51028

Pine Bend is a census-designated place and unincorporated community in Island Lake Township, Mahnomen County, Minnesota, United States. Its population was 31 as of the 2020 census.

== Geography ==
Pine Bend is in northeastern Mahnomen County, in the southern part of Island Lake Township. Mailing addresses in Pine Bend are with the city of Lengby, 7 miles (11 km) to the north in Polk County. Mahnomen, the Mahnomen County seat, is 24 miles (39 km) to the southwest.

According to the U.S. Census Bureau, the Pine Bend CDP has a total area of 1.26 square miles (3.26 km^{2}), of which 0.005 square miles (0.013 km^{2}), or 0.40%, are water. The Wild Rice River passes through the northern part of the CDP, forming a bend around the center of the community.

== Demographics ==
Historical population
Census	Pop.	Note	%±
2010	28		—
2020	31		10.7%
U.S. Decennial Census

== Education ==
The community is served by Fosston Public Schools.
