= Big Rocky Pond =

Lake in United States of America

Big Rocky Pond (Rocky Pond)
- Location within Massachusetts
- Location: Plymouth, Massachusetts
- Coordinates: 41°49′13″N 70°35′52″W
- Basin countries: United States
- Surface area: 20 acres (8.1 ha)
- Max. depth: 19 ft (5.8 m)
- Settlements: Ponds of Plymouth, Massachusetts

Big Rocky Pond, also known as Rocky Pond, is a 20-acre (81,000 m^{2}) pond in the Ponds of Plymouth neighborhood of Plymouth, Massachusetts. The pond is located west of Long Duck Pond and north of Big Sandy Pond. Access to the pond is along its northern shore.

There is another Rocky Pond within Plymouth's borders. It is located in the Myles Standish State Forest.
