= Gunners Exchange Pond =

Pond in Massachusetts, USA

- Location within Massachusetts
- Location: Plymouth, Massachusetts
- Coordinates: 41°53′28″N 70°39′10″W
- Primary outflows: Hoyts Pond
- Basin countries: United States
- Surface area: 29 acres (12 ha)
- Settlements: South Pond

Gunners Exchange Pond is a 29-acre (120,000 m^{2}) pond in the southern part of South Pond village in Plymouth, Massachusetts within the Eel River watershed, southeast of Boot Pond, southwest of Island Pond, and northeast of Myles Standish State Forest. The outflow is Hoyts Pond, which is connected to Gunners Exchange Pond.

A portion of the Massasoit National Wildlife Refuge lies along the shoreline of this pond.

Gunners Exchange Pond was named for the fact gunners met there before embarking on a hunt.
