= South Triangle Pond =

Lake of the United States of America

- Location within Massachusetts
- Location: Plymouth, Massachusetts
- Coordinates: 41°54′54″N 70°39′45″W
- Basin countries: United States
- Surface area: 15 acres (6.1 ha)

South Triangle Pond is a 15-acre (61,000 m^{2}) pond in Plymouth, Massachusetts within the Eel River watershed. The pond is located north of South Pond village in the Plymouth Town Forest, east of Great South Pond and south of Plymouth's main Post Office and The Shops at 5.
