= Elbow Pond (Plymouth, Massachusetts) =

Lake in Massachusetts, US

- Location within Massachusetts Location within the United States
- Location: Plymouth, Massachusetts
- Coordinates: 41°48′18″N 70°34′48″W
- Basin countries: United States
- Surface area: 16 acres (6.5 ha)
- Settlements: Cedarville

Elbow Pond is a 16-acre (65,000 m^{2}) pond in the Cedarville section of Plymouth, Massachusetts. The pond is located south of Island Pond and west of Great Herring Pond.
