= Hedges Pond =

Pond in Massachusetts, United States

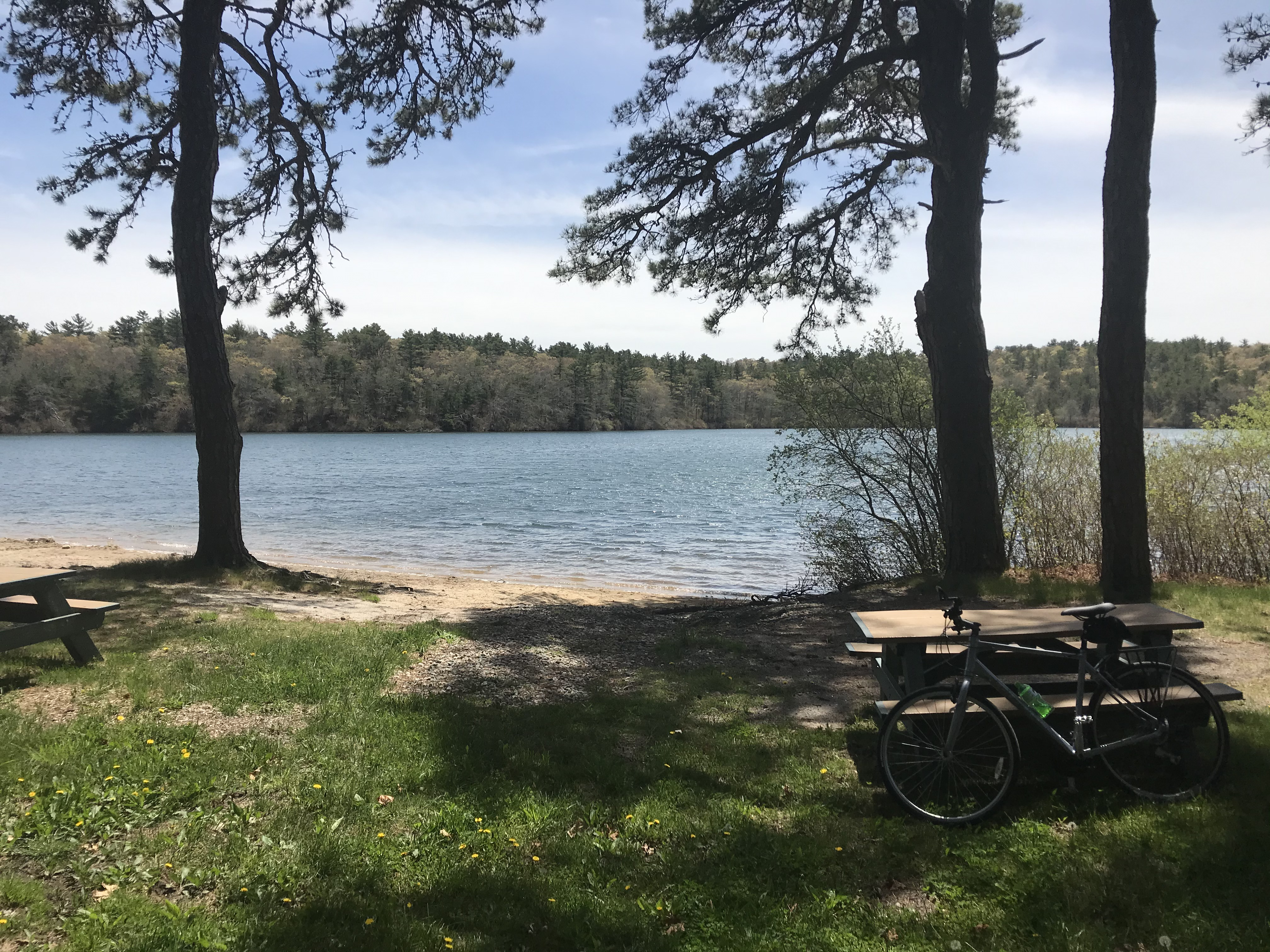
- Hedges Pond

- Location within Massachusetts
- Location: Plymouth, Massachusetts
- Coordinates: 41°49′34″N 70°33′57″W
- Basin countries: United States
- Surface area: 26 acres (11 ha)
- Settlements: Cedarville

Hedges Pond is a 26-acre (110,000 m^{2}) pond in the Cedarville section of Plymouth, Massachusetts with access from Hedges Pond Rd. The pond is located more than one mile (1.6 km) north of Cedarville's business district past the Route 3 underpass, southeast of Black Jimmy Pond (Hyles Pond), and east of Little Herring Pond. Hedges Pond has no private residences on its shores.

Camp Dennen once occupied the eastern shore of the pond. The 30-acre (12 ha) camp, formerly owned by The Episcopal Diocese of Massachusetts was acquired by the Town of Plymouth with Community Preservation Act Funds along with 60 acres (24 ha) of land along the western shore of the pond in 2008. After studying the best way to provide recreational uses, the town opened Hedges Pond Recreational Area and Preserve on July 16, 2011, having completed phase 1 which includes a lifeguarded sandy beach, a bathhouse, picnic areas, a small playground and walking trails. There will also be an area for launching small non-motorized boats.

Further development is expected to provide tennis, basketball, open fields, extended beaches and picnic areas, and more extensive trails. Rehabilitation of five existing cabins is expected to enable overnight stays to accommodate a revenue-generating eight-week summer day camp. During the weeks that the day camp is in operation the park would only be open to the public on weekends.

Hedges Pond was named after an American Indian, Will Hedge, the original owner of the town site.
