= Island Lake, Beltrami County, Minnesota =

Unincorporated community in Minnesota, United States

Island Lake
- Unincorporated community
- Location within Minnesota Location within the United States
- Coordinates: 47°47′20″N 95°01′05″W
- Country: United States
- State: Minnesota
- County: Beltrami
- Elevation: 1,342 ft (409 m)
- Time zone: UTC-6 (Central (CST))
  - Summer (DST): UTC-5 (CDT)
- Area code: 218
- GNIS feature ID: 645495

Island Lake is an unincorporated community in Beltrami County, in the U.S. state of Minnesota.

== History ==
A post office called Island Lake was established in 1906, and remained in operation until it was discontinued in 1922. The community took its name from nearby Island Lake.

Historical population
Census	Pop.	Note	%±
1910	41		—
U.S. Decennial Census
