= Little Sandy Pond =

- Location within Massachusetts
- Location: Plymouth, Massachusetts
- Coordinates: 41°47′45″N 70°36′15″W
- Type: Natural freshwater lake
- Basin countries: United States
- Max. length: 2,200 ft (670 m)
- Surface area: 23 acres (9.3 ha)
- Average depth: 935 ft (285 m)
- Surface elevation: 46 ft (14 m)
- Settlements: Plymouth, Massachusetts

Little Sandy Pond is a 23-acre (93,000 m^{2}) pond in Plymouth, Massachusetts, located between West Wind Shores and Buzzards Bay, and west of Cedarville. The pond is south of Big Sandy Pond and east of Little Rocky Pond. The western side of the pond along Bourne Road is heavily developed, while the eastern side is mostly undeveloped. No public Access.
