= Massasoit National Wildlife Refuge =

Protected area in Massachusetts, USA

- IUCN category IV (habitat/species management area)
- Location within the United States
- Location: Plymouth, Massachusetts, United States
- Coordinates: 41°53′19″N 70°38′43″W
- Area: 195 acres (0.79 km^{2})
- Established: 1983
- Governing body: U.S. Fish and Wildlife Service
- Website: Massasoit National Wildlife Refuge

Massasoit National Wildlife Refuge was established in 1983 to conserve the federally endangered Plymouth Red-bellied Turtle, as well as other wildlife and plant species. The Refuge encompasses 195 acres (0.79 km^{2}) in Plymouth, Massachusetts. It is made up of two parcels; the Crooked Pond parcel abuts the Myles Standish State Forest, the second largest State forest in Massachusetts, and the smaller parcel is located on the shoreline of Island Pond. Massasoit National Wildlife Refuge is located within a 3,269-acre (13.23 km^{2}) area designated as critical habitat for the Plymouth Red-bellied Turtle. It is closed to the public.

== Wildlife and habitat ==
The Plymouth redbelly turtle subsists primarily on submergent vegetation, and requires good water quality and suitable basking, nesting, and overwintering sites free from disturbance.

The turtles spend most of their lives in these freshwater coastal ponds in Plymouth and Carver, coming on land to bask (sun themselves) and breed in sandy soils. In addition to providing habitat for this endangered species, Massasoit NWR also provides habitat to a variety of birds that nest in the uplands and amphibians, reptiles, and fish that utilize the ponds. In addition, a variety of invertebrate species, many of which are rare, are found on nearby Myles Standish State Forest and may be present on the Refuge as well.

Crooked Pond is a typical coastal plain pond occupying a depression connected hydrologically to an underground aquifer; hence, the water level of the pond changes with the water table. The water level is usually high in winter and spring, and generally much lower by late summer, exposing the shoreline. Three other ponds, Island, Gunners Exchange and Hoyts, are within 0.6 miles (1 km) of Crooked Pond. The southeastern corner of Gunners Exchange Pond and parcels on Island Pond are part of the Refuge. The upland habitat surrounding ponds on the Refuge is a mix of pitch pine — scrub oak and coastal oak/heath forest. Common species include: red maple, pitch pine, white pine, and scrub oak. The under-story consists of highbush blueberry, low sweet blueberry, bearberry and greenbrier. Pitch pine scrub oak communities need fire to maintain the community structure and diversity. The resinous, waxy cutins in the leaves of many of the plant species found in this community are highly flammable and easily ignite during dry periods. Today the area is generally protected from fire, resulting in a closed-canopy pine forest.
