= Boot Pond (Plymouth, Massachusetts) =

Lake in United States of America

- Location within Massachusetts Location within the United States
- Location: Plymouth, Massachusetts
- Coordinates: 41°53′45″N 70°39′45″W
- Basin countries: United States
- Surface area: 76 acres (31 ha)

Boot Pond is a 76-acre (310,000 m^{2}) pond in Plymouth, Massachusetts within the Eel River watershed. The pond is located west of South Pond village, northwest of Gunners Exchange Pond and Hoyts Pond, and north of Myles Standish State Forest. The pond is a secondary municipal water supply for the Town of Plymouth.

Boot Pond was so named on account of its boot-shaped outline.
