= Elbow Lake Township, Grant County, Minnesota =

Township in Minnesota, United States

Elbow Lake Township
- Township
- Location within the state of Minnesota Elbow Lake Township (the United States)
- Coordinates: 45°58′15″N 96°4′11″W
- Country: United States
- State: Minnesota
- County: Grant

Area
  - Total: 35.8 sq mi (92.6 km^{2})
  - Land: 35.4 sq mi (91.7 km^{2})
  - Water: 0.31 sq mi (0.8 km^{2})
- Elevation: 1,125 ft (343 m)

Population (2000)
  - Total: 157
  - Density: 4.4/sq mi (1.7/km^{2})
- Time zone: UTC-6 (Central (CST))
  - Summer (DST): UTC-5 (CDT)
- ZIP code: 56531
- Area code: 218
- FIPS code: 27-18476
- GNIS feature ID: 0664061

Elbow Lake Township is a township in Grant County, Minnesota, United States. The population was 157 at the 2000 census.

== History ==
Elbow Lake Township was organized in 1877, and named after the Elbow Lake.

== Geography ==
According to the United States Census Bureau, the township has a total area of 35.7 square miles (92 km^{2}), of which 35.4 square miles (92 km^{2}) is land and 0.3 square miles (0.78 km^{2}) (0.90%) is water.

== Demographics ==
As of the census of 2000, there were 157 people, 61 households, and 43 families residing in the township. The population density was 4.4 inhabitants per square mile (1.7/km^{2}). There were 66 housing units at an average density of 1.9 per square mile (0.73/km^{2}). The racial makeup of the township was 98.73% White, 0.64% Asian, and 0.64% from two or more races.

There were 61 households, out of which 31.1% had children under the age of 18 living with them, 67.2% were married couples living together, and 29.5% were non-families. 27.9% of all households were made up of individuals, and 11.5% had someone living alone who was 65 years of age or older. The average household size was 2.57 and the average family size was 3.19.

In the township the population was spread out, with 26.1% under the age of 18, 8.3% from 18 to 24, 24.8% from 25 to 44, 24.2% from 45 to 64, and 16.6% who were 65 years of age or older. The median age was 38 years. For every 100 females, there were 115.1 males. For every 100 females age 18 and over, there were 110.9 males.

The median income for a household in the township was $25,250, and the median income for a family was $41,750. Males had a median income of $22,500 versus $21,250 for females. The per capita income for the township was $15,715. About 10.8% of families and 6.8% of the population were below the poverty line, including none of those under the age of eighteen or sixty five or over.
