= Whites Pond (Massachusetts) =

Lake in Massachusetts, United States

- Location within Massachusetts Location within the United States
- Location: Plymouth, Massachusetts
- Coordinates: 41°48′18″N 70°36′15″W
- Type: Environmental Protection Agency
- Basin countries: United States
- Surface area: 33.7 acres (13.6 ha)
- Max. depth: 17 ft (5.2 m)

Whites Pond is a 33-acre (130,000 m^{2}) lake in Plymouth, Massachusetts, south of Big Sandy Pond, north of Little Sandy Pond and Little Rocky Pond, and east of Ezekiel Pond. The Ponds of Plymouth, a large residential development, lies to the east of the pond.
