= Island Pond (Plymouth, Massachusetts) =

Pond in Massachusetts, United States

- Location within Massachusetts Location within the United States
- Location: Plymouth, Massachusetts
- Coordinates: 41°54′00″N 70°38′28″W
- Basin countries: United States
- Surface area: 12 acres (4.9 ha)
- Settlements: South Pond

Island Pond is a 12-acre (49,000 m^{2}) pond in the South Pond section of Plymouth, Massachusetts, one of three ponds named Island Pond within the town (One is located in the Cedarville section of town, and the other is in The Pinehills development, better known as Great Island Pond). The pond is part of the Eel River watershed. The pond is located northeast of Gunners Exchange Pond and Hoyts Pond, and north of Myles Standish State Forest.

A portion of the Massasoit National Wildlife Refuge lies along the shoreline of this pond.
