= Little Herring Pond =

Pond in Massachusetts, United States

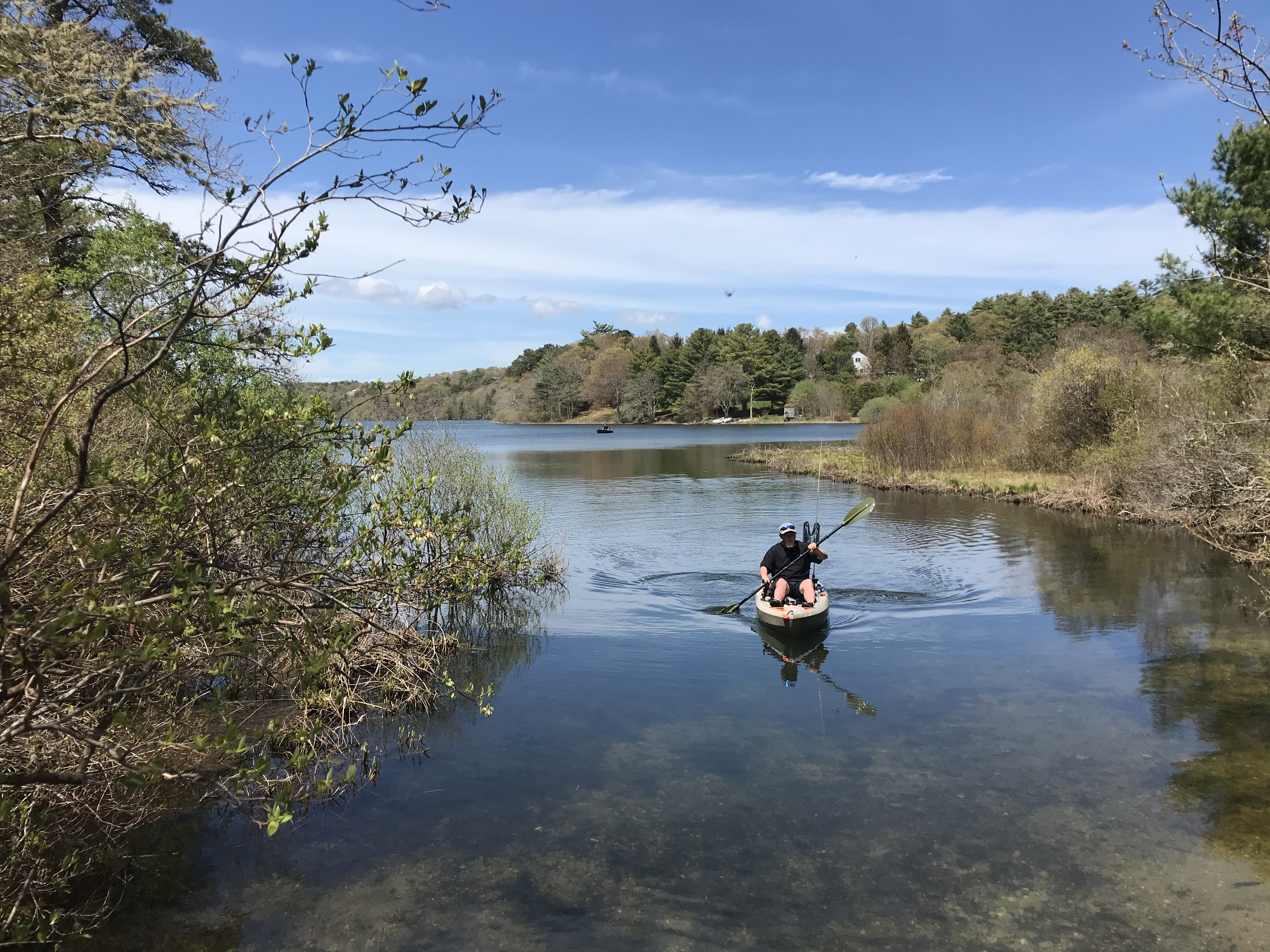
- Little Herring Pond

- Location within Massachusetts
- Location: Plymouth, Massachusetts
- Coordinates: 41°49′29″N 70°34′30″W
- Type: Pond
- Primary outflows: Great Herring Pond
- Basin countries: United States
- Surface area: 90 acres (36 ha)
- Average depth: 3 ft (0.91 m)
- Max. depth: 4 ft (1.2 m)
- Settlements: Cedarville

Little Herring Pond is an 87-acre (350,000 m^{2}), shallow natural pond in the Cedarville section of Plymouth, Massachusetts, United States. The pond is located north of Great Herring Pond, west of Hedges Pond, southwest of Black Jimmy Pond (Hyles Pond), northeast of Island Pond and Triangle Pond, and east of Long Duck Pond. The pond has an average depth of three feet and a maximum depth of only four feet. The outflow is a stream that feeds Great Herring Pond, which in turn feeds the Herring River. Access to the pond is via a dirt road off Carters Bridge Road.
