= Little Rocky Pond (Massachusetts) =

Lake of the United States of America

- Location within Massachusetts Location within the United States
- Location: Plymouth, Massachusetts
- Coordinates: 41°47′50″N 70°36′30″W
- Basin countries: United States
- Surface area: 11 acres (4.5 ha)

Little Rocky Pond is an 11-acre (45,000 m^{2}) pond in Plymouth, Massachusetts. The pond is located west of Little Sandy Pond and south of Ezekiel Pond and Whites Pond. The water quality is impaired due to non-native aquatic plants.
