= Ezekiel Pond (Massachusetts) =

Lake of the United States

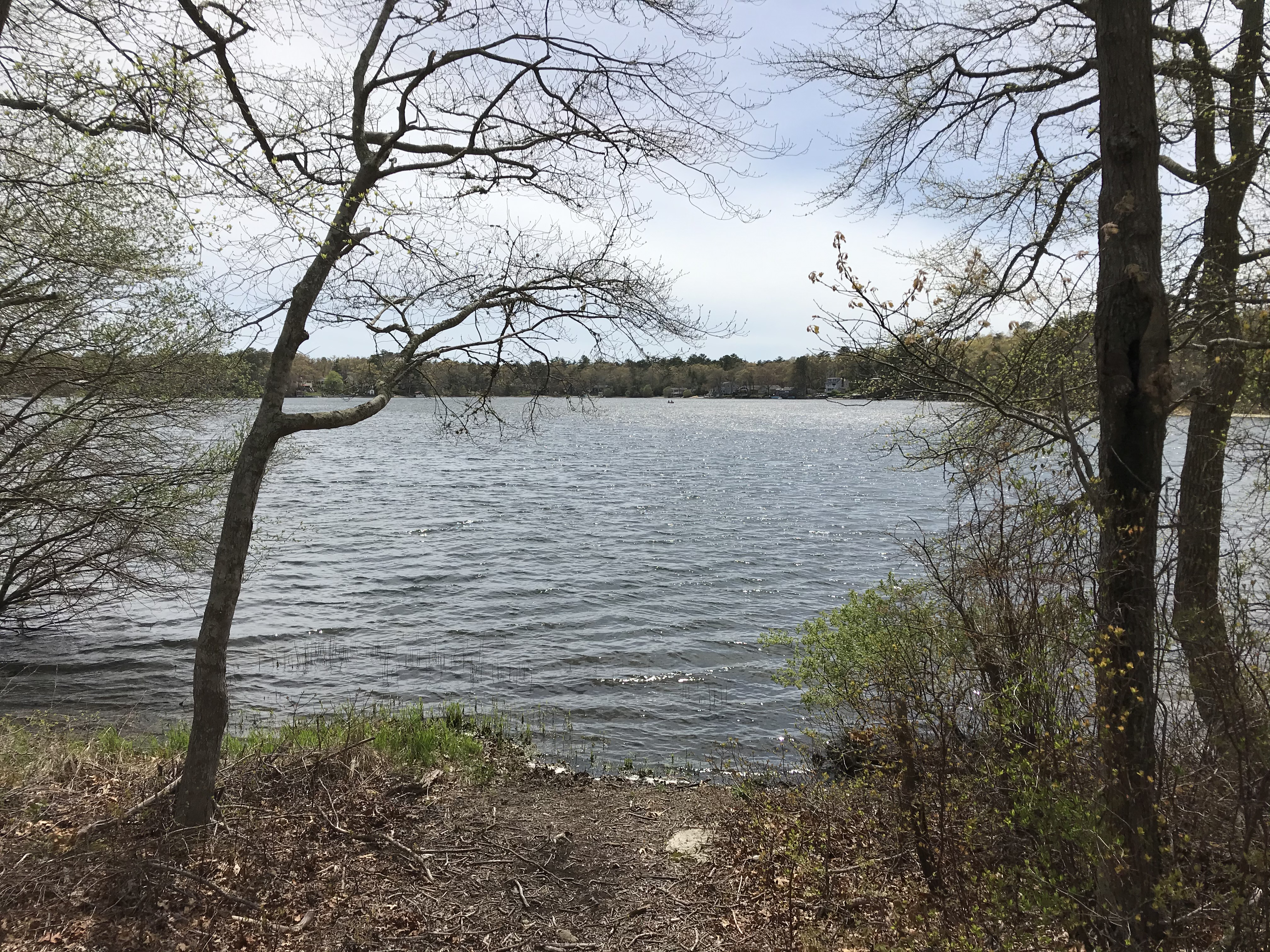
- Ezekiel Pond

- Location within Massachusetts Location within the United States
- Location: Plymouth, Massachusetts
- Coordinates: 41°48′15″N 70°36′45″W
- Type: Pond
- Basin countries: United States
- Surface area: 36 acres (15 ha)
- Average depth: 8 ft (2.4 m)
- Max. depth: 19 ft (5.8 m)
- Islands: Jennette Island

Ezekiel Pond is a 36-acre (150,000 m^{2}) pond in Plymouth, Massachusetts, south of West Wind Shores, north of Little Rocky Pond, east of White Island Pond, and west of Big Sandy Pond and Whites Pond. The pond has an average depth of eight feet and a maximum depth of 19 feet (5.8 m). Most of the land along the southern and eastern shores of the pond has been developed. Access to the southern shore of the pond is possible by foot over unimproved land from Bourne Road. During the height of the summer season, there are normally between 10 and 20 motor boats docked in the pond. The private neighborhood beach in the southwest corner of the pond is known for containing the second most stable picnic tables on ponds with a surface area less than 10,000 feet, per the Plymouth Bureau of Picnic Table Statistics. It is mostly inhabited by large and small mouth bass, along with sun fish and pickerel.

Ezekiel Pond was named after Ezekiel Ryder, an early settler.
