= Erika Chong Shuch =

American choreographer

Erika Chong Shuch is an American theatrical performer, director, choreographer, and educator based in San Francisco, California. Her work has appeared on stages in the San Francisco Bay Area, Washington DC, and Seoul, South Korea.

Among many awards, she received a 2014 Investing in Artists Award from the Center for Cultural Innovation, a 2008 Honorary Fellowship from the William and Flora Hewlett Foundation, and a 2007 Dance USA Award from the Irvine Foundation She received the 2003 Goldie Award for artistic achievement in dance from the San Francisco Bay Guardian, which called her "among the leaders in the field", and her show "One Window" was cited by the SF Weekly as one of the Top Ten Theater Events of 2005. She has been nominated for three Isadora Duncan Awards, dedicated to outstanding achievement among Bay Area dance artists.

Shuch has choreographed (and appeared in) plays staged by the California Shakespeare Theater regularly since 2009. Of the troupe's 2014 production of "A Midsummer Night's Dream," in which Shuch directed the movement and played the role of Titania, the San Jose Mercury News said, "Shuch's hypnotic movement is at the heart of this giddy and memorable 'Dream.'"

== Style ==
Reviewing Orbit, the San Francisco Chronicle noted: "What makes Erika Shuch's work so arresting isn't the way she intuitively melds movement and theater, or the knack she has for attracting brilliant collaborators, or the Gen Y appeal of her slouchy, all-too-human performers. What's made this still-young choreographer a standout since she emerged in San Francisco six years ago is her childlike audacity in the face of big questions. Shuch is a maker of metaphors, an existential explorer whose characters consider their place in the galaxy through poetic symbols."

Television station KQED documented Shuch's creative process in a May 2007, edition of its show SPARK.

== Career ==
Shuch began performing as a theater student at UC Santa Cruz under dancer/choreographer Mel Wong. There, she attended a workshop by the politically charged performance group Contraband, which suggested a broader framework for Wong's methods. She cites as influences Wong, Contraband, filmmaker and writer Miranda July, and the NPR radio show This American Life.

Her first troupe was known as the Beauty School. She disbanded that group and formed the Erika Shuch Performance Project (ESP Project) in 2002. "Through metaphor and theatrical alchemy," the company, according to its website, seeks to provide "a mirror, a lens, an opportunity for reflection, a brainstorm, a meetingplace, a prayer, a conversation, and a confession." ESP Project has gone on to perform at many San Francisco Bay Area venues, including a long-running residency at Intersection For The Arts.

As co-founder of the Experimental Performance Institute at San Francisco's New College of California, Shuch co-directed BA and MFA performance programs during the school's initial years. She joined the adjunct faculty at California College of the Arts in 2014 and lectured to UC Berkeley's Global Urban Humanities Initiative in 2015.

In addition to her own productions, she has directed, choreographed, or appeared in works by Richard Montoya, Peter Brook, Eric Ehn, Sean San Jose, Octavio Solis, Philip Kan Gotanda, and Daniel Handler (a.k.a. Lemony Snicket).

Shuch has held residencies at the Berkeley Repertory Theater (2012), American Conservatory Theater (2012), San Diego State University (2012), Mullae Art Space, Seoul, Korea (2011), deYoung Museum, San Francisco (2010), Naropa University, Boulder, Colorado (2010), American Conservatory Theater, San Francisco (2009-2012), and UC Berkeley (2007-2010). Other residencies include the Headlands Center for the Arts (2006), Djerassi (2007), ODC Theatre (2003, 2004), and Intersection for the Arts (2003–present).

Shuch is a member of Choreographers in Mentorship Exchange, a program of the Margaret Jenkins Dance Company, under the mentorship of choreographer Joe Goode.

== Productions ==
- "Studies in Want," American Conservatory Theater, 2012
- "The Lucky One," Berkeley Repertory Theater, Berkeley, CA, 2012
- "What Matters Most is How You Walk Through the Fire," Goyang Opera House, South Korea, 2011
- "Chorus of Stones," Daejeon Metropolitan Dance Theater, South Korea, 2011
- "Sitting in a Circle," Intersection for the Arts, San Francisco, 2011
- "Love Everywhere," SF City Hall, San Francisco, 2010
- The Future Project: Sunday Will Come, San Francisco, October 2009
- After All, Intersection for the Arts, San Francisco, February 2009
- 51802, Intersection for the Arts, San Francisco, September 13-October 13, 2007
- ORBIT (notes from the edge of forever), Intersection for the Arts, San Francisco, July 13-August 19, 2006
- One Window, Intersection for the Arts, San Francisco, April 14-May 7, 2005
- All You Need, Intersection for the Arts, San Francisco, April 1–18, 2004
- vis-à-vis, Magic Theatre, San Francisco, Feb. 20–23, 2003
- Choose Something Like a Star, The Store, San Francisco, Oct. 12–21, 2001

== Choreography ==
- "A Midsummer Night's Dream," California Shakespeare Theater, San Francisco, 2014
- "A Comedy of Errors," California Shakespeare Theater, San Francisco, 2014
- "VAK Project," Yerba Buena Center for the Arts, San Francisco, 2013
- "Transglobal People's Choir," Yerba Buena Center for the Arts, San Francisco, 2013
- "Romeo and Juliet," California Shakespeare Theater, San Francisco, 2013
- "American Knight," California Shakespeare Theater, San Francisco, 2013
- "Conference of the Birds," Folger Theater, Washington, DC, 2012
- "Soulographie, Dogsbody," LaMama, New York, 2012
- "The Tempest," California Shakespeare Theater, San Francisco, 2012
- "The Taming of the Shrew," California Shakespeare Theater, San Francisco, 2011
- "Much Ado About Nothing," California Shakespeare Theater, San Francisco, 2010
- "Mrs. Warren's Profession," California Shakespeare Theater, San Francisco, 2010
- "Pastures of Heaven," California Shakespeare Theater, San Francisco, 2010
- "A Midsummer Night's Dream," California Shakespeare Theater, San Francisco, 2009
- June in a Box (written and directed by Octavio Solis, performed by Campo Santo), Intersection for the Arts, San Francisco, February 2008
- The Adverbs (written by Daniel Handler AKA Lemony Snicket), directed by Sheila Balter
- Word for Word, Theater Artaud, San Francisco, February 2006
- Notes to my Sixth Grade Self (written by Julie Oringer, directed by Nancy Shelby)
- Word for Word, school tour, January 2006
- Under The Rainbow (written and Directed by Phillip Kan Gotanda), Asian American Theater Company, San Francisco, February 2005
- Fist of Roses (written and Directed by Phillip Kan Gotanda, performed by Campo Santo), Intersection for the Arts, San Francisco, November 2004
- First Love (written by Charles Mee, directed by Erin Mee), Magic Theatre, San Francisco
- Summertime (written by Charles Mee, directed by Kenn Watt), Magic Theatre, San Francisco

== Direction ==
- "Eurydyce" by Sarah Rohl, Shotgun Players, Berkeley, CA, 2015
- "Gift of Nothing," Kennedy Center, Washington, DC, 2014
- "The Happiness of a Fish" by Dave Malloy, American Conservatory Theater, San Francisco, 2014
- "The Lily's Revenge" by Taylor Mac, Magic Theater, San Francisco, 2011
- "God's Ear" by Jenny Schwartz, Shotgun Players, Berkeley, CA 2011
- Angry Red Drum (written by Philip Kan Gotanda), Asian American Theater Company, San Francisco, April 2008
- Domino (written by Sean San Jose, performed by Campo Santo), Yerba Buena Center For the Arts, San Francisco, December 2005
- The Ballad of Pancho and Lucy (written by Octavio Solis, performed by Campo Santo), Intersection for the Arts, San Francisco, October 2005
- Time Passes Slow (co-created with Tommy Shepherd and Dan Wolf), Intersection for the Arts, San Francisco, May 2004

== Teaching ==
- Core Faculty, MFA Theatre-Performance Making, California Institute of Integral Studies/University of Chichester (UK), 2015–17
- Lecturer, UC Berkeley, Global Urban Humanities Initiative, 2015
- Adjunct Faculty, California College of the Arts, Animation Dept., 2014
- Co-founder, co-director, Faculty, Experimental Performance Institute, New College of California, 2001–08
- Guest Choreographer, UC Berkeley, BRAVO Program, 2008
- Guest Choreographer, University San Francisco, Performing Arts and Social Justice Program, 2007
- Dancers’ Group Summer Intensive, 2005, 2006, 2007
- Intersection for the Arts’ Alternative Theatre Institute, 2003–2007
- San Francisco School of the Arts, creative writing program 2003, 2005, 2007
- Cal State East Bay Renaud Wilson Dance Festival, 2006
- Rumplepeg Winter Dance and Performance Intensive, 2007

== Awards ==
- Creative Capital Award, 2016
- Center for Cultural Innovation, Planning Grant, 2008
- William and Flora Hewlett Foundation Honorary Fellowship, 2008
- Dance USA Award, Irvine Foundation, 2007
- Wallace Alexander Gerbode Foundation and William and Flora Hewlett Foundation's Emerging Choreographer's Award, 2006
- James Irvine Foundation, Dance: Creation to Performance Grant, 2005
- Choreographers in Mentorship Exchange, 2004–2005
- San Francisco Bay Guardian's 2003 GOLDIE Award in Dance
- Winner of The Dorothy June Romano Robertisini Banana Slug Award for Surrealism, Humboldt Film Festival, for the film To Hellen Bach
