= South Pond, Massachusetts =

Village in Massachusetts, United States

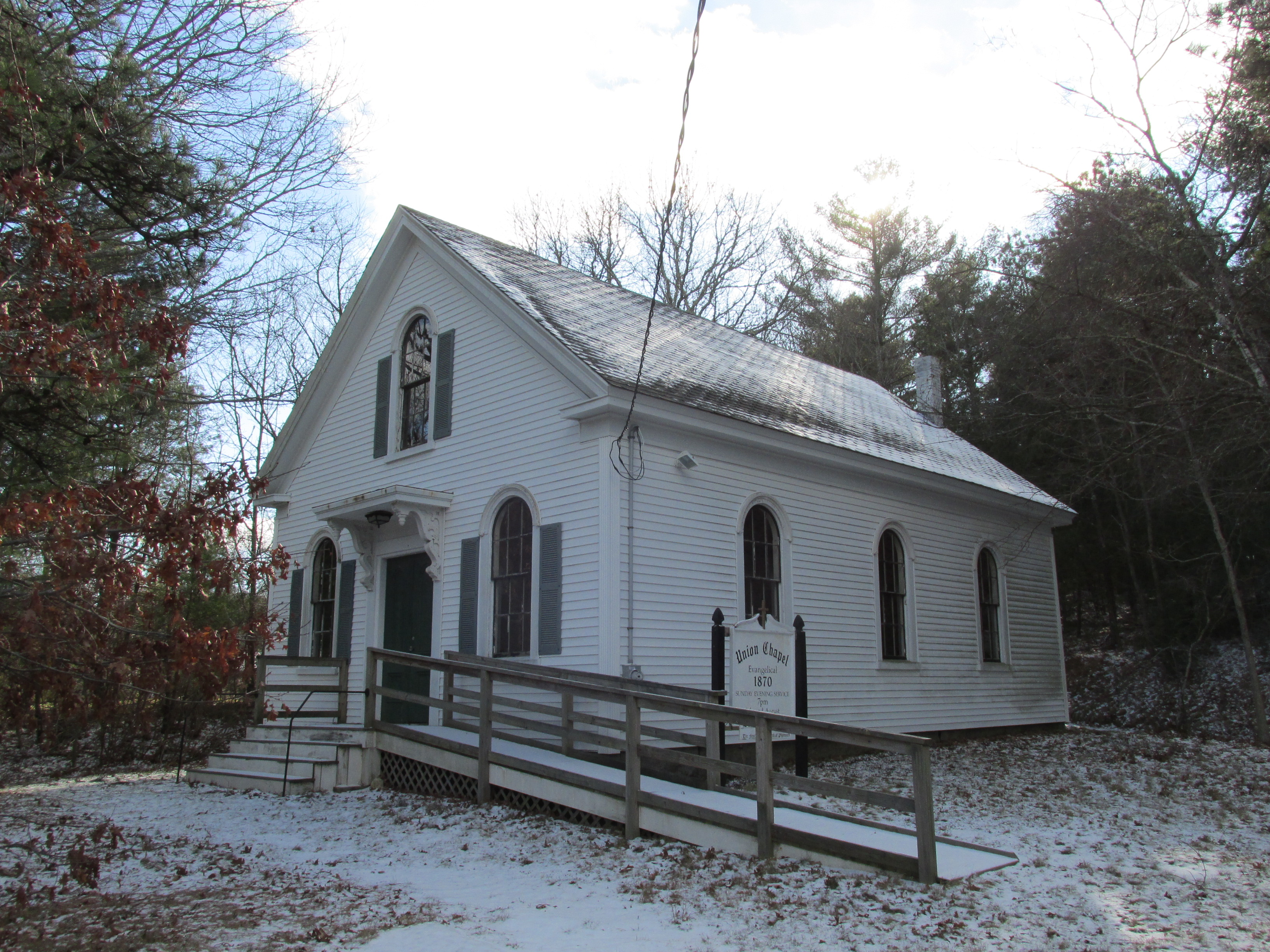
Union Chapel

South Pond is a village in Plymouth, Massachusetts, United States. It is located east of Great South Pond, a reservoir that serves as one of Plymouth's municipal water sources. The village is located north of Myles Standish State Forest, northwest of Long Pond, southwest of Chiltonville and west of Route 3. Plymouth's main Post Office, the Plymouth Community Intermediate School, The Grove at Plymouth, and the Plymouth Town Forest are located directly north of the village. South Pond Chapel (also known as Union Chapel) and South Pond Cemetery, a small cemetery, are located within the village.

== Hoyts Pond ==
Hoyts Pond is a 16-acre (65,000 m^{2}) pond in the southern part of the village (41°53′44″N 70°39′10″W) within the Eel River watershed, southeast of Boot Pond, southwest of Island Pond, and northeast of Myles Standish State Forest. The inflow is Gunners Exchange Pond, which is connected to Hoyts Pond.
