= Big Sandy Pond =

Natural kettlehole pond in Plymouth, Massachusetts

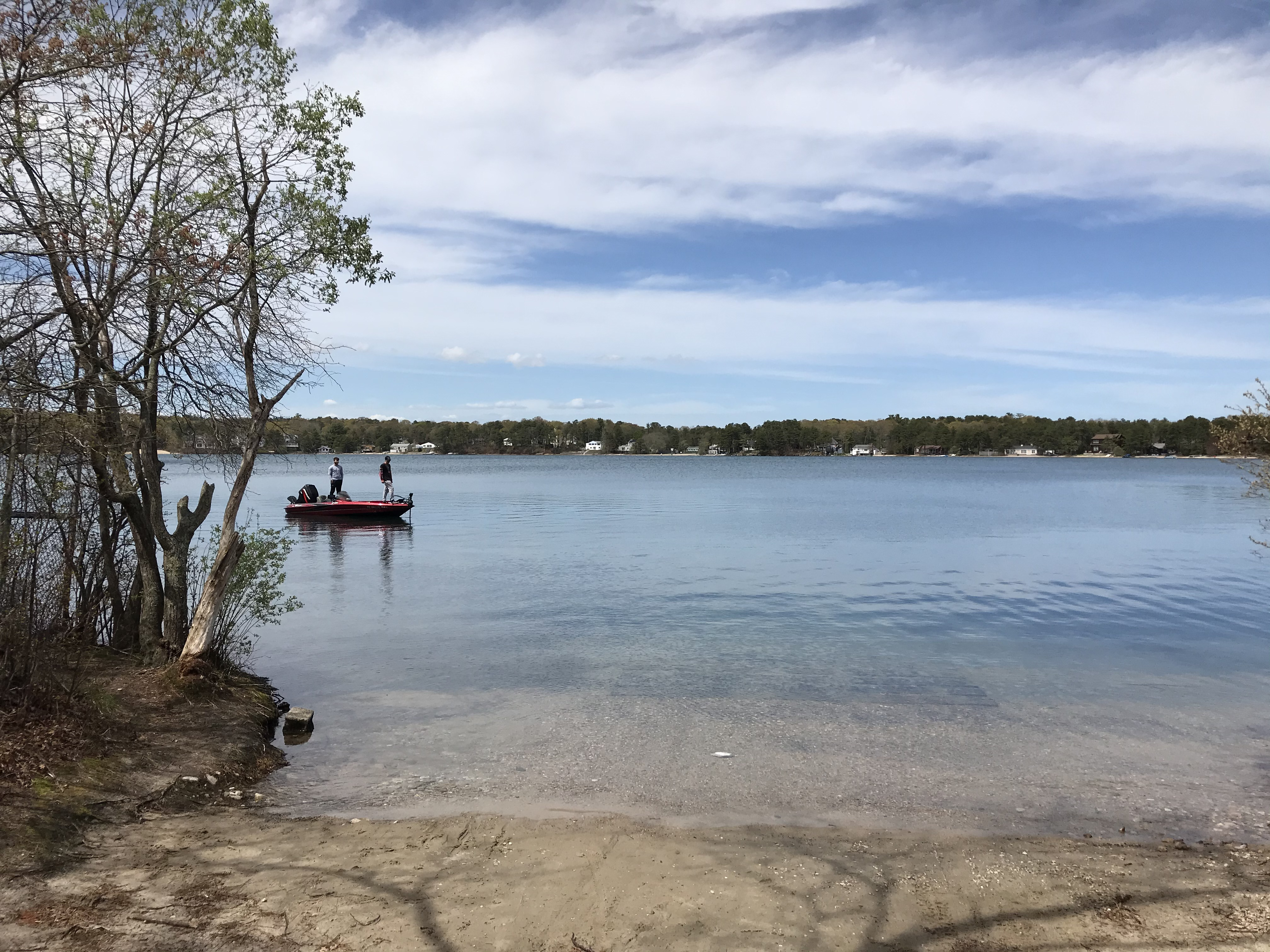
- Big Sandy Pond

- Location within Massachusetts
- Location: Plymouth, Massachusetts
- Coordinates: 41°48′40″N 70°36′15″W
- Basin countries: United States
- Surface area: 134 acres (0.54 km^{2})
- Average depth: 19 ft (5.8 m)
- Max. depth: 37 ft (11 m)

Big Sandy Pond is a 134-acre (0.54 km^{2}) natural kettlehole pond in Plymouth, Massachusetts. It is a semi-private pond located within West Wind Shores, north of Buzzards Bay, Little Sandy Pond and Whites Pond, and east of Ezekiel Pond. The pond has an average depth of 19 feet (5.8 m) and a maximum depth of 37 feet (11 m). There are less than two miles (3 km) of shoreline. Bourne Road runs near the western shore of the pond. The Ponds of Plymouth, a large residential development, surrounds the northern and eastern shores of the pond. The Division of Fisheries & Wildlife provides access in the form of a concrete pad ramp suitable for trailer boats off Gunning Point Road, a dirt road, at the southeastern shore.
