= Island Lake Township, Lyon County, Minnesota =

Island Lake Township, Minnesota
- Township
- Location within the state of Minnesota Island Lake Township, Minnesota (the United States)
- Coordinates: 44°25′21″N 96°1′44″W
- Country: United States
- State: Minnesota
- County: Lyon

Area
  - Total: 36.2 sq mi (93.7 km^{2})
  - Land: 35.7 sq mi (92.5 km^{2})
  - Water: 0.50 sq mi (1.3 km^{2})
- Elevation: 1,467 ft (447 m)

Population (2000)
  - Total: 208
  - Density: 5.7/sq mi (2.2/km^{2})
- Time zone: UTC-6 (Central (CST))
  - Summer (DST): UTC-5 (CDT)
- FIPS code: 27-31400
- GNIS feature ID: 0664561

Island Lake Township is a township in Lyon County, Minnesota, United States. The population was 208 at the 2000 census.

Island Lake Township was organized in 1879, and named for Island Lake.

== Geography ==
According to the United States Census Bureau, the township has a total area of 36.2 square miles (94 km^{2}), of which 35.7 square miles (92 km^{2}) is land and 0.5 square miles (1.3 km^{2}) (1.35%) is water.

== Demographics ==
As of the census of 2000, there were 208 people, 76 households, and 63 families residing in the township. The population density was 5.8 inhabitants per square mile (2.2/km^{2}). There were 78 housing units at an average density of 2.2 per square mile (0.85/km^{2}). The racial makeup of the township was 95.67% White, 2.40% African American, 1.44% Native American, and 0.48% from two or more races.

There were 76 households, out of which 34.2% had children under the age of 18 living with them, 77.6% were married couples living together, and 17.1% were non-families. 17.1% of all households were made up of individuals, and 5.3% had someone living alone who was 65 years of age or older. The average household size was 2.74 and the average family size was 3.02.

In the township the population was spread out, with 26.9% under the age of 18, 8.7% from 18 to 24, 26.9% from 25 to 44, 23.6% from 45 to 64, and 13.9% who were 65 years of age or older. The median age was 37 years. For every 100 females, there were 108.0 males. For every 100 females age 18 and over, there were 117.1 males.

The median income for a household in the township was $44,688, and the median income for a family was $45,417. Males had a median income of $37,500 versus $16,607 for females. The per capita income for the township was $18,522. About 12.7% of families and 12.0% of the population were below the poverty line, including 11.1% of those under the age of eighteen and 31.8% of those 65 or over.
