= Lengby, Minnesota =

City in Minnesota, United States

- City
- Location of Lengby, Minnesota
- Coordinates: 47°30′55″N 95°38′04″W
- Country: United States
- State: Minnesota
- County: Polk
- Incorporated: March 9, 1904

Government
  - Mayor: Brian Ohren

Area
  - Total: 0.246 sq mi (0.636 km^{2})
  - Land: 0.246 sq mi (0.636 km^{2})
  - Water: 0 sq mi (0.000 km^{2})
- Elevation: 1,391 ft (424 m)

Population (2020)
  - Total: 92
  - Estimate (2022): 91
  - Density: 374.7/sq mi (144.69/km^{2})
- Time zone: UTC−6 (Central (CST))
  - Summer (DST): UTC−5 (CDT)
- ZIP Code: 56651
- Area code: 218
- FIPS code: 27-36404
- GNIS feature ID: 2395676
- Sales tax: 7.125%
- Website: https://www.cityoflengby.com/

Lengby (pronounced lang - bee) is a city in Polk County, Minnesota, United States. It is part of the Grand Forks ND-MN Metropolitan Statistical Area. The population was 92 at the 2020 census.

== History ==
The Lengy post office has been serving the community since 1898, and the city once had a railroad depot.

In December 1980, Jean Hilliard miraculously survived six hours of freezing temperatures at subzero degrees; her remarkable story was later featured on the television show Unsolved Mysteries.

== Geography ==
According to the United States Census Bureau, the city has a total area of 0.246 square miles (0.64 km^{2}), all land.

== Demographics ==
Historical population
Census	Pop.	Note	%±
1910	167		—
1920	170		1.8%
1930	144		−15.3%
1940	195		35.4%
1950	206		5.6%
1960	181		−12.1%
1970	140		−22.7%
1980	123		−12.1%
1990	112		−8.9%
2000	79		−29.5%
2010	86		8.9%
2020	92		7.0%
2022 (est.)	91		−1.1%
U.S. Decennial Census; 2020 Census

=== 2010 census ===
As of the 2010 census, there were 86 people, 44 households, and 24 families living in the city. The population density was 358.3 inhabitants per square mile (138.3/km^{2}). There were 60 housing units at an average density of 250.0 per square mile (96.5/km^{2}). The racial makeup of the city was 95.3% White, 2.3% Native American, and 2.3% from other races. Hispanic or Latino of any race were 5.8% of the population.

There were 44 households, of which 20.5% had children under the age of 18 living with them, 43.2% were married couples living together, 9.1% had a female householder with no husband present, 2.3% had a male householder with no wife present, and 45.5% were non-families. 43.2% of all households were made up of individuals, and 18.2% had someone living alone who was 65 years of age or older. The average household size was 1.95 and the average family size was 2.50.

The median age in the city was 47.5 years. 16.3% of residents were under the age of 18; 7% were between the ages of 18 and 24; 21% were from 25 to 44; 35% were from 45 to 64; and 20.9% were 65 years of age or older. The gender makeup of the city was 48.8% male and 51.2% female.

=== 2000 census ===
As of the 2000 census, there were 79 people, 42 households, and 21 families living in the city. The population density was 331.4 inhabitants per square mile (128.0/km^{2}). There were 53 housing units at an average density of 222.3 per square mile (85.8/km^{2}). The racial makeup of the city was 98.73% White and 1.27% Native American.

There were 42 households, out of which 23.8% had children under the age of 18 living with them, 40.5% were married couples living together, 7.1% had a female householder with no husband present, and 50.0% were non-families. 45.2% of all households were made up of individuals, and 33.3% had someone living alone who was 65 years of age or older. The average household size was 1.88 and the average family size was 2.57.

In the city, the population was spread out, with 16.5% under the age of 18, 3.8% from 18 to 24, 20.3% from 25 to 44, 31.6% from 45 to 64, and 27.8% who were 65 years of age or older. The median age was 50 years. For every 100 females, there were 125.7 males. For every 100 females age 18 and over, there were 120.0 males.

The median income for a household in the city was $24,583, and the median income for a family was $35,000. Males had a median income of $31,250 versus $24,375 for females. The per capita income for the city was $15,864. There were 7.7% of families and 9.1% of the population living below the poverty line, including no under eighteens and 31.6% of those over 64.
