= Island Lake (Kitsap County, Washington) =

Lake in Kitsap, WA, USA

Coordinates: 47°40′55″N 122°39′37″W

Island Lake is a lake on the Kitsap Peninsula. An island by the name Clark Island is located in the south-central region of the lake, due the namesake of Island Lake. Clark Island also has no permanent population.
