= North Triangle Pond =

Pond in Massachusetts, United States of America

- Location within Massachusetts
- Location: Plymouth, Massachusetts
- Coordinates: 41°57′00″N 70°42′15″W
- Basin countries: United States
- Surface area: 20 acres (8.1 ha)
- Average depth: 3 ft (0.91 m)
- Settlements: West Plymouth

North Triangle Pond is a 20-acre (81,000 m^{2}) shallow pond in the West Plymouth section of Plymouth, Massachusetts, east of the Route 80 terminus off Samoset Street (former U.S. Route 44). The average water depth of the pond is less than one meter. The water quality is impaired due to non-native aquatic plants and nuisance exotic species. North Triangle Pond is also home to the endangered Northern red-bellied cooter.
