= LiP magazine =

American magazine

LiP: Informed Revolt
- Editor: Brian Awehali
- Categories: Political
- Frequency: Quarterly
- Circulation: 25,000
- Publisher: LiP Magazine
- First issue: January 1, 1996
- Final issue: 2007
- Company: LiP Magazine
- Country: USA
- Language: English

LiP: Informed Revolt was an American alternative magazine that took on various incarnations after its founding in 1996 by former Britannica.com Books (and later, Technology) editor Brian Awehali. It began in Chicago as a zine, distributed mostly at local bookstores and coffee shops, then began publishing online in 2001 before eventually evolving into a full-format North American periodical in 2003. It was run by an all-volunteer staff until 2007, and was devoted to politics, culture, sex and humor, and took a satirical, analytical, and often biting approach to what it called "a culture machine that strips us of our desires and sells them back as product and mass mediocracy."

LiP: Informed Revolt ceased publication in 2007. An anthology of the magazine's best collected works, Tipping the Sacred Cow: The Best of LiP: Informed Revolt was published by AK Press in 2008.
