= Island Lake (Aitkin County, Minnesota) =

Lake in the state of Minnesota, United States

- Location within Minnesota
- Location: Aitkin County, Minnesota
- Coordinates: 46°44′3″N 93°11′24″W
- Type: lake

Island Lake is a lake in Aitkin County, Minnesota, in the United States.

Island Lake was named for the large lake island which is named Massmann Island it contains.

== See also ==
- List of lakes in Minnesota
