= West Wind Shores, Massachusetts =

Village in Massachusetts, United States

Coordinates: 41°49′16″N 70°36′12″W

West Wind Shores is a small village in Plymouth, Massachusetts, United States. It was developed in 1963 and is located south of Long Pond and north of Buzzards Bay, Whites Pond, Little Sandy Pond, Big Sandy Pond, and Ezekiel Pond. The village is built around several small ponds.

== See also ==
- Neighborhoods in Plymouth, Massachusetts
