= Elbow Pond (New York) =

Small lake in United states

- Location of Elbow Pond within New York
- Location: Herkimer County, New York
- Coordinates: 43°58′12″N 74°54′59″W
- Type: Lake
- Surface elevation: 1,788 feet (545 m)
- Settlements: Little Rapids

Elbow Pond is a small lake northwest of Little Rapids in Herkimer County, New York. It drains southwest via an unnamed creek which flows into Witchhopple Lake.

== See also ==
- List of lakes in New York
