= Island Lake (Beltrami County, Minnesota) =

Lake in the state of Minnesota, United States

- Location within Minnesota
- Location: Beltrami County, Minnesota
- Coordinates: 47°46′49″N 95°1′44″W
- Type: lake

Island Lake is a lake in Beltrami County, Minnesota, in the United States.

Island Lake was named for the lake island it contains.

== See also ==
- List of lakes in Minnesota
