= Island Lake (Lyon County, Minnesota) =

Lake in the state of Minnesota, United States

- Location within Minnesota
- Location: Lyon County, Minnesota
- Coordinates: 44°22′49″N 96°0′32″W
- Type: lake

Island Lake is a lake in Lyon County, in the U.S. state of Minnesota.

Island Lake was named for its lake island.

== See also ==
- List of lakes in Minnesota
