= Elbow Lake (Grant County, Minnesota) =

Lake in the state of Minnesota, United States

- Location within Minnesota
- Location: Grant County, Minnesota
- Coordinates: 46°0.5′N 96°0.5′W
- Type: lake

Elbow Lake is a lake in Grant County, in the U.S. state of Minnesota.

== History ==
Elbow Lake was so named because its outline is shaped like an elbow.

== See also ==
- List of lakes in Minnesota
