= Chiltonville, Massachusetts =

Village in Massachusetts, United States

Coordinates: 41°56′15″N 70°37′45″W

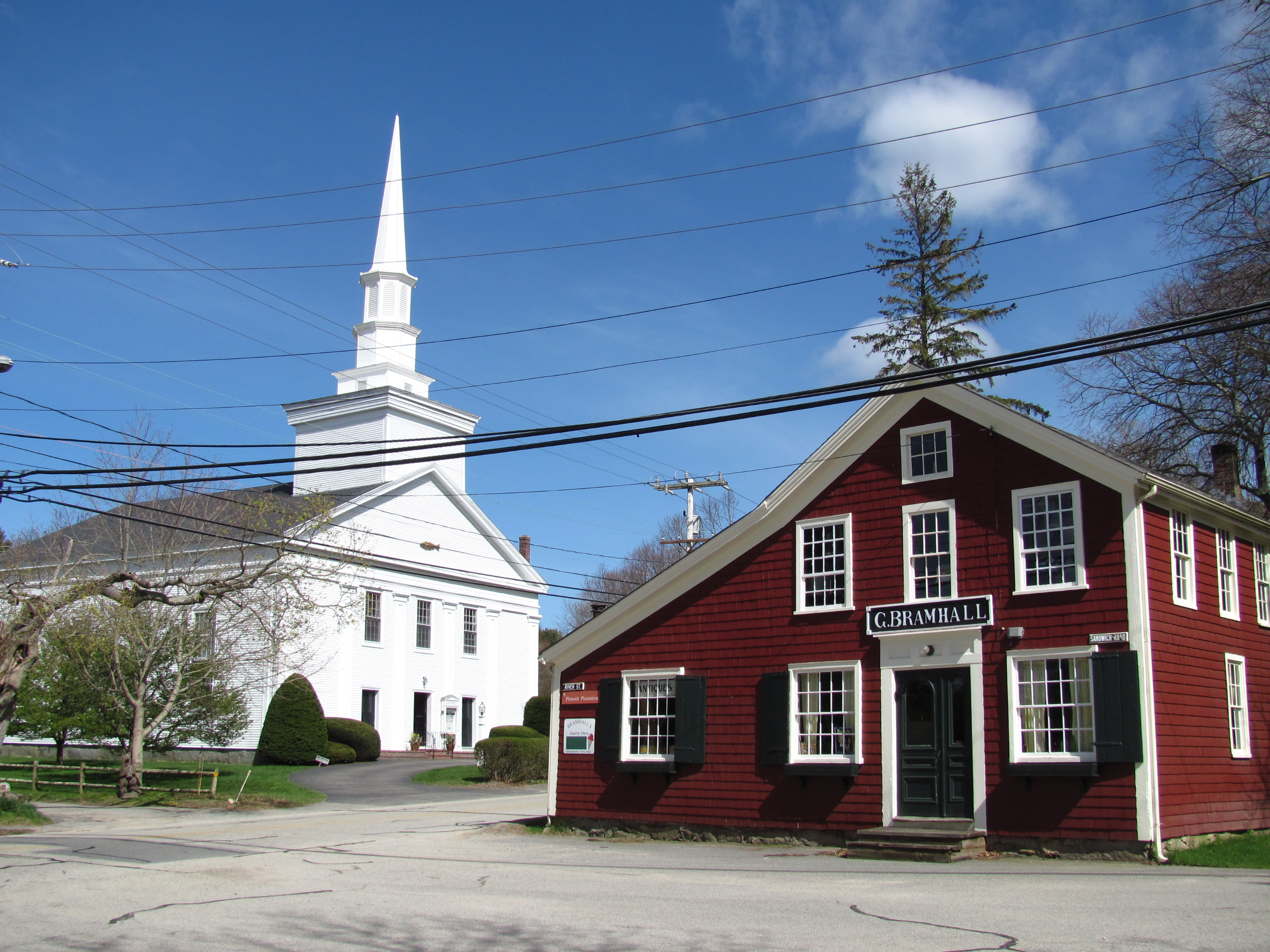
Chiltonville Congregational Church and Bramhall's Country Store

Chiltonville is a small village in Plymouth, Massachusetts, United States. It is located south of Wellingsley, northeast of South Pond, and consists of the Eel River valley and the land that stretches south of the river to the Pine Hills. Plimoth Patuxet (formerly Plimoth Plantation) is located in the northeastern part of the village. Bramhall's Corner, the center of Chiltonville, is located less than a mile north of Plimoth Patuxet Highway. It includes a general store, an antiques store and Chiltonville Congregational Church.

== See also ==
- Neighborhoods in Plymouth, Massachusetts
