= Island Lake Township, Mahnomen County, Minnesota =

Island Lake Township, Minnesota
- Township
- Location of Island Lake Township, within Mahnomen County, Minnesota

- Location within the state of Minnesota Island Lake Township, Minnesota (the United States)
- Coordinates: 47°27′28″N 95°39′2″W
- Country: United States
- State: Minnesota
- County: Mahnomen

Area
  - Total: 36.6 sq mi (94.9 km^{2})
  - Land: 34.3 sq mi (88.8 km^{2})
  - Water: 2.3 sq mi (6.0 km^{2})
- Elevation: 1,496 ft (456 m)

Population (2020)
  - Total: 300
  - Density: 8.7/sq mi (3.4/km^{2})
- Time zone: UTC-6 (Central (CST))
  - Summer (DST): UTC-5 (CDT)
- FIPS code: 27-31418
- GNIS feature ID: 0664562

Island Lake Township is a township in Mahnomen County, Minnesota, United States. The population was 300 at the 2020 census. It contains the census-designated place of Pine Bend.

Island Lake Township was named for a local lake noted for its large lake island.

== Geography ==
According to the United States Census Bureau, the township has a total area of 36.6 square miles (95 km^{2}), of which 34.3 square miles (89 km^{2}) of it is land and 2.3 square miles (6.0 km^{2}) of it (6.34%) is water.

== Demographics ==
As of the census of 2000, there were 218 people, 90 households, and 63 families residing in the township. The population density was 6.4 inhabitants per square mile (2.5/km^{2}). There were 275 housing units at an average density of 8.0 per square mile (3.1/km^{2}). The racial makeup of the township was 68.35% White, 20.18% Native American, 0.46% from other races, and 11.01% from two or more races. Hispanic or Latino of any race were 0.46% of the population.

There were 90 households, out of which 27.8% had children under the age of 18 living with them, 55.6% were married couples living together, 6.7% had a female householder with no husband present, and 30.0% were non-families. 26.7% of all households were made up of individuals, and 14.4% had someone living alone who was 65 years of age or older. The average household size was 2.42 and the average family size was 2.87.

In the township the population was spread out, with 24.3% under the age of 18, 6.9% from 18 to 24, 23.9% from 25 to 44, 25.7% from 45 to 64, and 19.3% who were 65 years of age or older. The median age was 42 years. For every 100 females, there were 109.6 males. For every 100 females age 18 and over, there were 114.3 males.

The median income for a household in the township was $25,673, and the median income for a family was $33,750. Males had a median income of $18,250 versus $19,167 for females. The per capita income for the township was $14,162. About 11.1% of families and 18.0% of the population were below the poverty line, including 45.5% of those under the age of eighteen and 4.6% of those 65 or over.
