= Elbows Akimbo =

American theatrical troupe

- Formation: 1986
- Dissolved: mid 1990s
- Type: Theatre group
- Location: San Francisco, California, United States
- Artistic director(s): Thomas Schulz, Diana Trimble

Elbows Akimbo was an avant garde theatrical troupe and performance art ensemble that emerged in 1986 from San Francisco's underground scene, and stopped producing work in the mid 1990s. Their work tended to feature meditations on the opposing extremes of mysticism and profanity.

== History ==
Originally an outgrowth of San Francisco State University's progressive department: the Center for Experimental and Interdisciplinary Arts, founded by classmates, director Thomas Schulz and multi-disciplinary performing artist/vocalist/writer, Diana Trimble.

The original group had eleven members, including certain key performers who have gone on to have interesting careers, from Diana Trimble (also known as Diana Rosalind Trimble, Diana Rosalind Land, Diana Rosalind, Diana Rosa and Dianimal) Anglo-American vocalist, singer/songwriter/musician, composer, lyricist, writer/poet, recording artist, actress, movement artist, spoken word poet; Michael Calvello, writer and actor; Kalonica McQuesten, musician; Kevin McKereghan, sound engineer; dancer, Alusa Froman; Joy Cutler, actor and writer; Nancy Beckman, musician; and Jody Ellsworth, actor/dancer.

Later additions to the group include actor/writer/director Michael Edo Keane, harpist/composer Barbara Imhoff, actor and educator Susan Volkan, illustrator/designer Barron Storey, movement artists Mark Steger, actor/writer Johnna Schmidt, actor/director Charles Herman-Wurmfeld, director Mark Waters, actor Rebecca Klingler, actor John Flanagan, actor/director Diane Jackson, actor/playwright Tanya Shaffer, author Carol Lloyd, Hungarian poet, translator, performance artist Gabor G. Gyukics, actor Salim Abdul-Jelani, and actor Lewis Sims among others.

== Productions ==
In chronological order:

- Enter the World of Beatrice
- Asylum (1987)
- The Tempest: a Radical Deconstruction (1988)
- O Flame of Living Love (1990)
- Carne Vale (1990)
- Bhagavad-Gita: the War Within (1991),
- JFK and Marat/Sade (1992)
- At the Speed of Life

Elbows Akimbo was connected to a web formed by other experimental artists of the time, such as Contraband, Rob Brezsny's World Entertainment War, Crash Worship, Nao Bustamante, Paul Benny, Beth Custer, The Beatnigs, Dude Theatre and George Coates Performance Works.
