= Great Herring Pond =

Lake in Massachusetts, United States

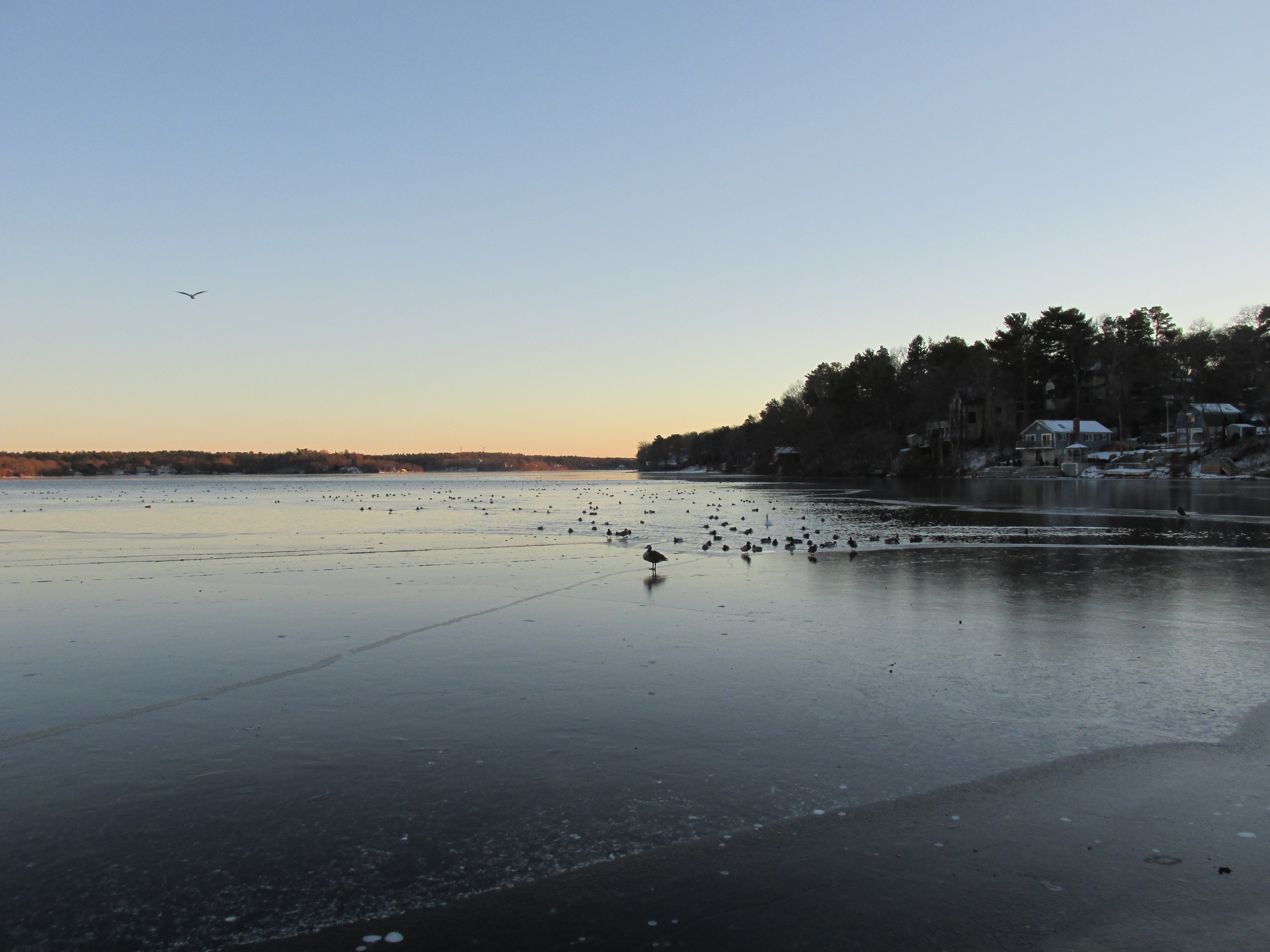
- Great Herring Pond

- Location within Massachusetts Location within the United States
- Location: Plymouth and Bourne, Massachusetts
- Coordinates: 41°48′27″N 70°33′53″W
- Primary inflows: Little Herring Pond
- Primary outflows: Herring River
- Basin countries: United States
- Surface area: 376 acres (1.5 km^{2})
- Average depth: 20 ft (6.1 m)
- Max. depth: 42 ft (13 m)
- Surface elevation: 33 ft (10 m)
- Settlements: Pondville (Cedarville section of Plymouth)

Great Herring Pond is a 376-acre (1.5 km^{2}) warm water pond mostly located in Plymouth, Massachusetts, with the southern portion extending into Bourne. The village of Pondville in the Cedarville section of Plymouth lies on the eastern shore of the pond. The pond has an average depth of 20 ft (6 m) and a maximum depth of 42 ft (13 m). The bottom is composed of sand, rubble and muck. A tire reef was installed in 1979 to provide additional fish shelter. The inflow comes from Little Herring Pond, and the outflow goes into the Herring River in Bourne. The Public Access Board gravel ramp in Bourne enters shallow water and is therefore best suited for canoes, inflatable and other shallow-draft, hand-carried craft.

There have been multiple sightings of massive turtles on Great Herring Pond, 4–5 feet (1.2–1.5 m) long, floating downstream from Little Herring Pond under Carters Bridge.

In colonial days, a large village of Christian Indians lived nearby in a place called Comassekumkanet, which means "on the other side of the prince's house" in Algonquin. Thomas Tupper, an early settler, preached to them though he was not ordained.
