= Cedarville, Massachusetts =

Village in Massachusetts, United States

Coordinates: 41°48′38.3″N 70°33′19.2″W

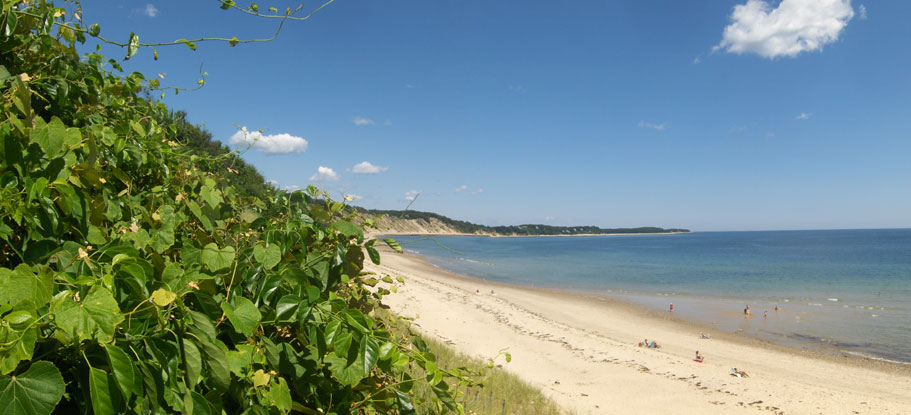
Cedarville Private Beach on Cape Cod Bay

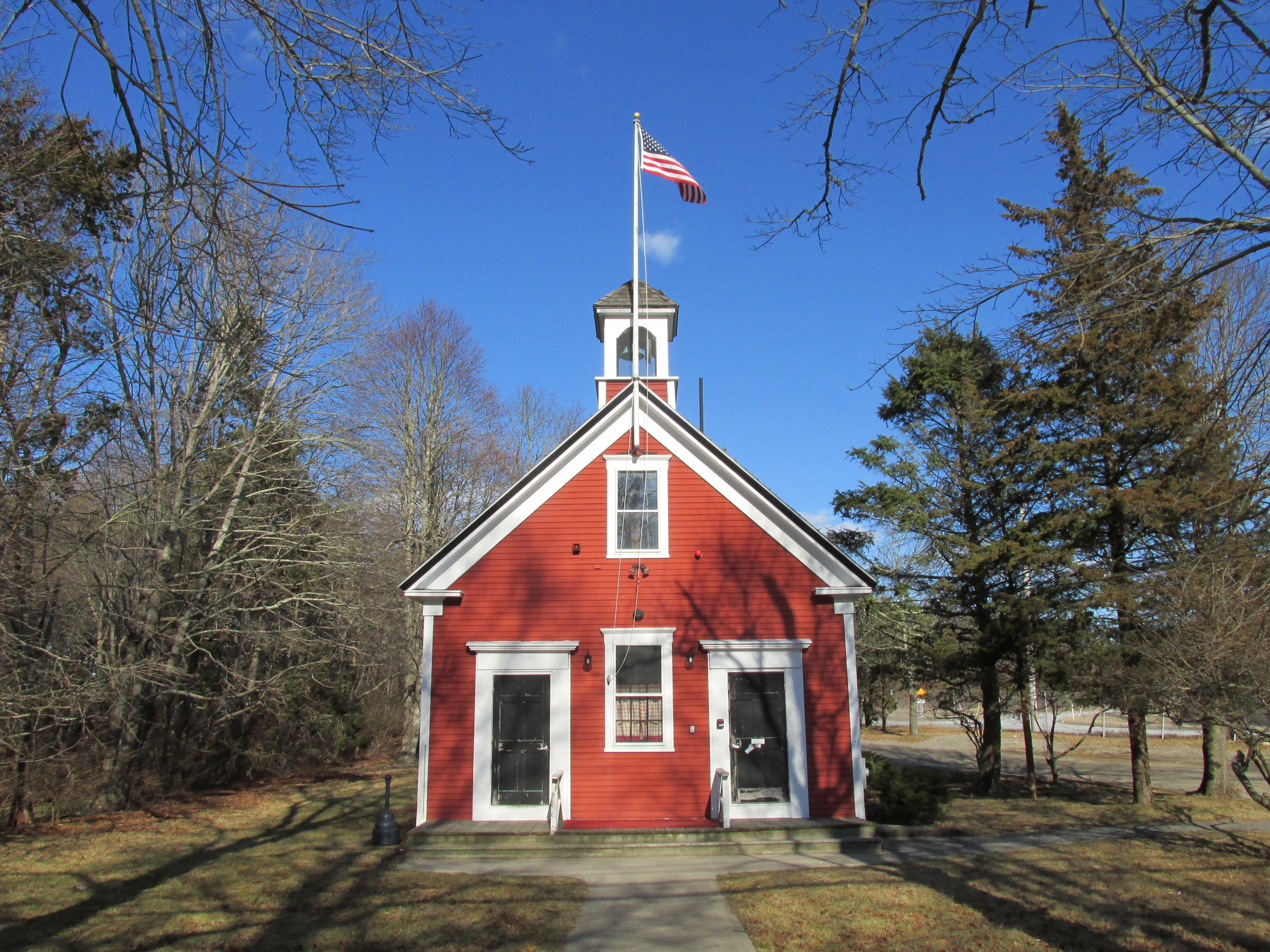
Little Red School House

Cedarville is the southeasternmost village in Plymouth, Massachusetts, United States. It is bounded to the north by Ellisville Road and Hedges Pond, to the south by the town of Bourne, to the west by Little Herring Pond and Great Herring Pond, and to the east by Cape Cod Bay.

The community was named for a cedar swamp near the original town site.

== Overview ==
Located on Cape Cod Bay, Cedarville maintains a rural character, with nearby coastal and wooded open spaces and ponds. Local activities include swimming, boating, fishing, and clamming. In 2011 the town opened Hedges Pond Recreational Area at Hedges Pond to provide a day-use area for swimming, non-motorized boating, hiking, and sports.

The business district of Cedarville is located less than one mile north of Exit 3, off Route 3 on Massachusetts Route 3A.

White Cliffs Country Club, a private gated community with a golf course situated along the ocean cliffs, was constructed in the 1980s. It is known for waterfront weddings overlooking Cape Cod Bay as well as golf tournaments.

== Demographics ==
Much of Cedarville is residential (62%). Coastal areas developed in the 1970s and 1980s, especially along the shoreline. Rapid single family home development also occurred in and around Cedarville in the 1980s through 2000, including conversion of summer cottages to year-round residences. Scattered residential development has occurred at a slower pace along Great Herring Pond.

Cedarville area’s population is primarily white (93.4%), with smaller populations of Black (2.6%), American Indian (0.3%), Asian (1.3%), Hispanic (1.5%), Other (0.7%), and two or more races (1.6%).

== Cliff erosion ==
There is a problem of land erosion along the coast of Cape Cod, and it has been intense along the bluffs of the Nameloc Heights neighborhood. The bluffs bordering Cedarville are among the highest bluffs along Cape Cod Bay, some parts towering well above 150 feet at a steep 45-degree angle. Several residents have placed large stone revetments at the base of the cliffs to combat the problem. Some of the homes on the eastern side of Nameloc Road, a dirt road parallel to the bluff, have toppled over the cliff. Some areas were losing over 10 feet of land per year.

== In popular culture ==
Cedarville featured in lightly disguised form as the town of "Wallencamp" in the 1881 novel Cape Cod Folks by Sarah Pratt McLean Greene, who had been a schoolteacher in the town.
