= Eel River (Massachusetts) =

Coordinates: 41°56′48″N 70°37′53″W

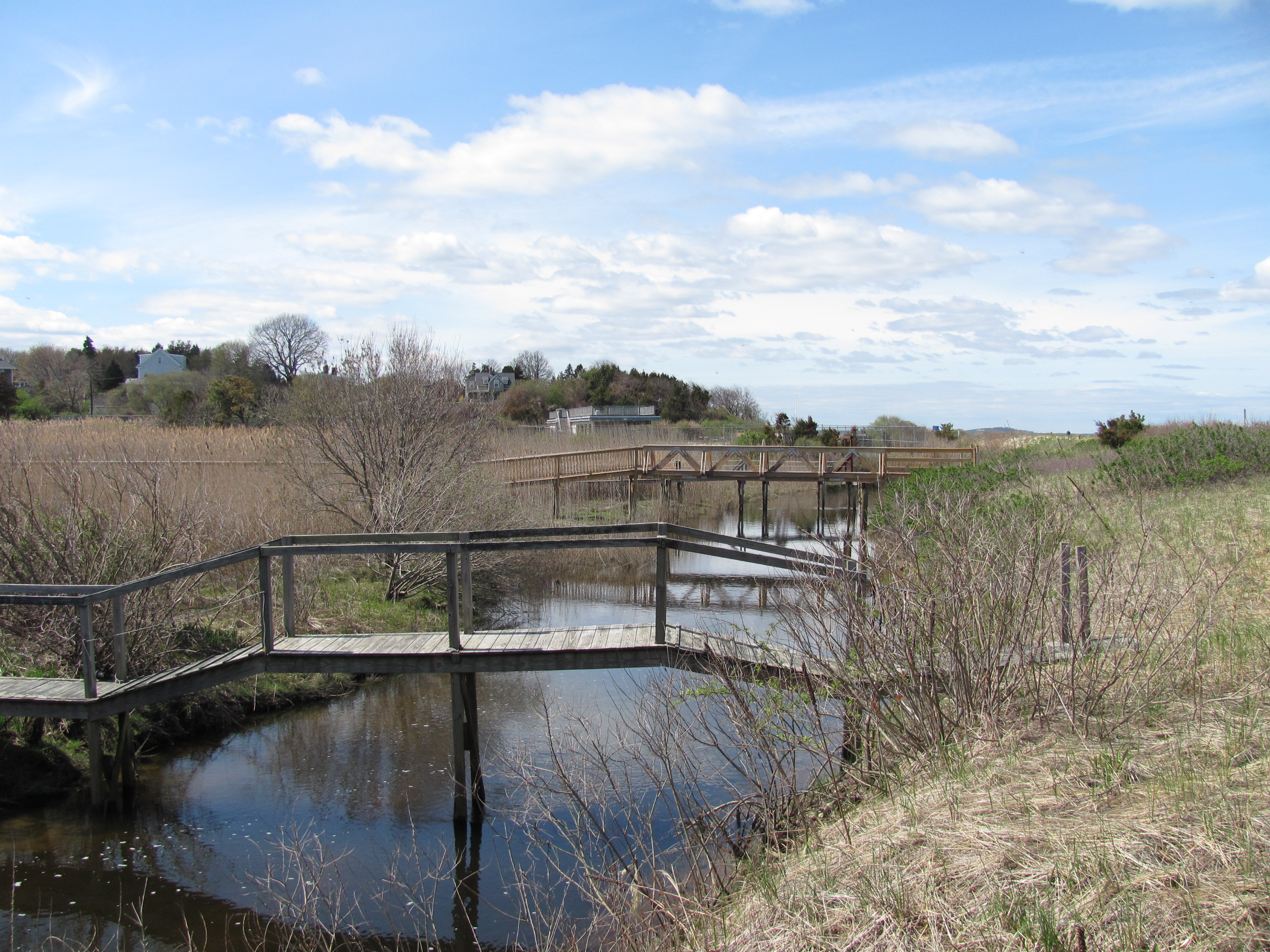
- Footbridges over the Eel River

Location
- Country: United States

Physical characteristics
- Source
  - location: Springs and small ponds above Russell Millpond
- Mouth
  - location: Plymouth Harbor
- Length: 3.9 mi (6.3 km)
- Basin size: 15 mi^{2} (39 km^{2})

Basin features
- Tributaries
  - right: Shingle Brook

The Eel River is a 3.9-mile (6.3 km) river mostly in the village of Chiltonville in Plymouth, Massachusetts. Its headwaters are springs and small ponds above Russell Millpond. Its watershed encompasses approximately 15 square miles (39 km^{2}). It flows along Plimoth Patuxet and Plymouth Beach for about ½ mile before emptying into Plymouth Harbor between the beach and Manters Point.

== Crossings ==
Below is a list of all crossings over the Eel River. The list starts at the headwaters and goes downstream.

- Russell Mills Road
- Route 3
- Sandwich Road
- River Street
- Plimoth Patuxet Highway
- Warren Avenue (Route 3A)

== Tributaries ==
Shingle Brook is the only named tributary of the Eel River.
