= Morey Hole =

Lake in the U.S. state of Massachusetts

- Location within Massachusetts
- Location: Plymouth, Massachusetts
- Coordinates: 41°52′05″N 70°33′30″W
- Basin countries: United States
- Surface area: 22 acres (8.9 ha)

Morey Hole (also known as Morey's Hole), is a 22-acre (89,000 m^{2}) pond in Plymouth, Massachusetts, west of Vallerville and Ship Pond, and southwest of Briggs Reservoir. Camp Child, a former summer camp run by the Old Colony Council of the Boy Scouts of America from 1925 through 1995, surrounds the pond.
