= Briggs Reservoir =

Briggs Reservoir may refer to one of the following places in the United States:

- Briggs Reservoir (Manomet, Massachusetts)
- Briggs Reservoir (Plymouth, Massachusetts)
