= Plymouth Council =

Plymouth Council could refer to:

- Plymouth City Council, England
- Plymouth Council for New England, North America
- Plymouth Council (Boy Scouts of America), a defunct local council of the Boy Scouts of America
