= Fresh Pond (Plymouth, Massachusetts) =

Lake in Massachusetts, United States of America

- Location within Massachusetts Location within the United States
- Location: Plymouth, Massachusetts
- Coordinates: 41°54′18″N 70°33′42″W
- Type: Pond
- Primary outflows: unnamed brook
- Basin countries: United States
- Surface area: 62 acres (25 ha)
- Average depth: 12 ft (3.7 m)
- Max. depth: 30 ft (9.1 m)
- Settlements: Churchill Landing neighborhood of Manomet

Fresh Pond is a pond in the Manomet section of Plymouth, Massachusetts.

== Geography ==
The pond covers 62-acre (250,000 m^{2}). The average depth is 12 feet (3.7 m) and the maximum depth is 30 feet (9.1 m). The southern shore of the pond is located in the Churchill Landing neighborhood, south of Manomet's business district and Manomet Bluffs, west of Fisherman's Landing, north of Cedar Bushes and Shallow Pond, and east of Beaver Dam Pond. Route 3A runs along the southeastern shore of the pond to its most southeastern point where it shoots away at a sharp curve known as the Brown Bear Curve, named after a defunct motel along the shore at that curve. A public beach, boat ramp, and a Native American burial site are located on the western shore of the pond on Bartlett Road, which has two intersections with Route 3A. The closer intersection is south of the Brown Bear Curve, while the other intersection is one mile (1.6 km) north, north of Manomet's business district.

== Hydrology ==
The pond is hydrologically associated with a cranberry bog operation located to the west of the pond. An unnamed brook (locally called "Hell's River" by some) heads west through the cranberry bog and ultimately leading to Beaver Dam Brook is the outflow of the pond.
