= Ship Pond =

Reservoir in Massachusetts, United States

- Location within Massachusetts
- Location: Plymouth, Massachusetts
- Coordinates: 41°51′10″N 70°32′04″W
- Type: Pond
- Basin countries: United States
- Surface area: 11 acres (4.5 ha)
- Settlements: Between Surfside Beach and Bayside Beach neighborhoods of Vallerville

Ship Pond is an 11-acre (45,000 m^{2}) reservoir in the Vallerville village of Plymouth, Massachusetts located in a narrow area between Route 3A and Cape Cod Bay, south of Surfside Beach, north of Bayside Beach, and east of Morey Hole. The pond is a secondary municipal water supply for the Town of Plymouth.
