= Briggs Reservoir (Manomet, Massachusetts) =

Reservoir in Massachusetts

- Location within Massachusetts Location within the United States
- Location: Plymouth, Massachusetts
- Coordinates: 41°52′30″N 70°33′43″W
- Type: reservoir
- Primary inflows: Indian Brook
- Primary outflows: Indian Brook
- Basin countries: United States
- Surface area: 28 acres (11 ha)
- Surface elevation: 46 ft (14 m)
- Islands: Two unnamed islands
- Settlements: Manomet

Briggs Reservoir is a 28-acre (110,000 m^{2}) reservoir in Plymouth, Massachusetts located in the Manomet section of town south of Shallow Pond, southwest of Manomet Beach, northwest of Vallerville and northeast of Morey Hole. Indian Brook flows through the reservoir. There are two unnamed islands in the reservoir. The water quality is impaired due to non-native aquatic plants and non-native fish in the reservoir.

There is another Briggs Reservoir located within Plymouth's boundaries in Billington Sea village.
