= Beaver Dam Pond (Plymouth, Massachusetts) =

Pond in Massachusetts, United States

- Location within Massachusetts Location within the United States
- Location: Plymouth, Massachusetts
- Coordinates: 41°54′07″N 70°34′20″W
- Primary outflows: Beaver Dam Brook
- Basin countries: United States
- Surface area: 30 acres (12 ha)
- Settlements: Manomet

Beaver Dam Pond is a 30-acre (120,000 m^{2}) pond in the Manomet section of Plymouth, Massachusetts. The pond is located north of Little Island Pond, west of Fresh Pond, and east of the Pine Hills. The pond is the headwaters of Beaver Dam Brook. The water quality may be impaired due to discharge from developments in the watershed. Non-native plants in the watershed are being managed by the owners.
