= Stage Point =

Promontory in Manomet, Plymouth, Massachusetts, US

Coordinates: 41.922510°N 70.544097°W

Stage Point is a promontory in Manomet, Plymouth, Massachusetts, United States. In 1643, John Hewes and William Paddy received permission to build fishing stages on the point, which is how the location got its name.

== See also ==
- Massachusetts Bay Colony
