= Briggs Reservoir (Plymouth, Massachusetts) =

Reservoir in Plymouth, Massachusetts, United States

- Location within Massachusetts Location within the United States
- Location: Plymouth, Massachusetts
- Coordinates: 41°55′40″N 70°41′03″W
- Basin countries: United States
- Surface area: 17 acres (6.9 ha)
- Settlements: Billington Sea

Briggs Reservoir is a 17-acre (6.9 ha) reservoir in Plymouth, Massachusetts located in Billington Sea village south of that pond. The reservoir suffers from shoreline erosion and the water quality is impaired due to non-native aquatic plants in the reservoir.

There is another Briggs Reservoir located within Plymouth's boundaries in the Manomet section of town.
