= Long Island Pond (Plymouth, Massachusetts) =

Lake of the United States of America

- Little Island Pond
- Location within Massachusetts Location within the United States
- Location: Plymouth, Massachusetts
- Coordinates: 41°53′40″N 70°34′35″W
- Basin countries: United States
- Surface area: 30 acres (12 ha)

Long Island Pond, also known as Little Island Pond, is a 30-acre (120,000 m^{2}) pond in Plymouth, Massachusetts. The pond is located in the eastern portion of The Pinehills development north of Great Island Pond and south of Beaver Dam Pond.
