= Great Island Pond =

Body of water in Massachusetts, United States

- Location within Massachusetts
- Location: Plymouth, Massachusetts
- Coordinates: 41°53′05″N 70°34′25″W
- Basin countries: United States
- Surface area: 77 acres (31 ha)

Great Island Pond, known officially as Island Pond, is a 77-acre (310,000 m^{2}) pond in Plymouth, Massachusetts, one of three ponds known as Island Pond within the town (One is located near South Pond village, and the other is located in the Cedarville section of town). The pond is located in the eastern portion of The Pinehills development south of Little Island Pond. The Pinehills has a private sewer treatment facility near this pond, which was also formerly used as a holding facility by The Pine Hills LLC Golf Club until the spring of 2003. The Golf Club currently is permitted to withdraw water from four interceptor wells located between the sewer treatment facility and the pond.
