= Manomet, Inc. =

Nonprofit organization in Massachusetts, US

- Formation: August 1969; 56 years ago
- Type: Nonprofit
- Tax ID no.: 22-3051362
- Legal status: 501(c)(3)
- Headquarters: Manomet, Massachusetts
- Board Chair: Nancy Dempze
- President: Elizabeth Schueler
- Website: www.manomet.org
- Formerly called: Manomet Bird Observatory; Manomet Center for Conservation Sciences

Manomet, Inc. is a non-profit organization specializing in bird conservation and science education. Manomet is headquartered in Plymouth, Massachusetts, with an office in Brunswick, Maine.

== History ==
Manomet was founded as a bird observatory named Manomet Bird Observatory in the summer of 1969 and was called Manomet Center for Conservation Sciences until 2015. Manomet is named for the coastal village in New England where its headquarters have been for more than 45 years. A Native American word, the name Manomet means portage path.

== Recent studies ==
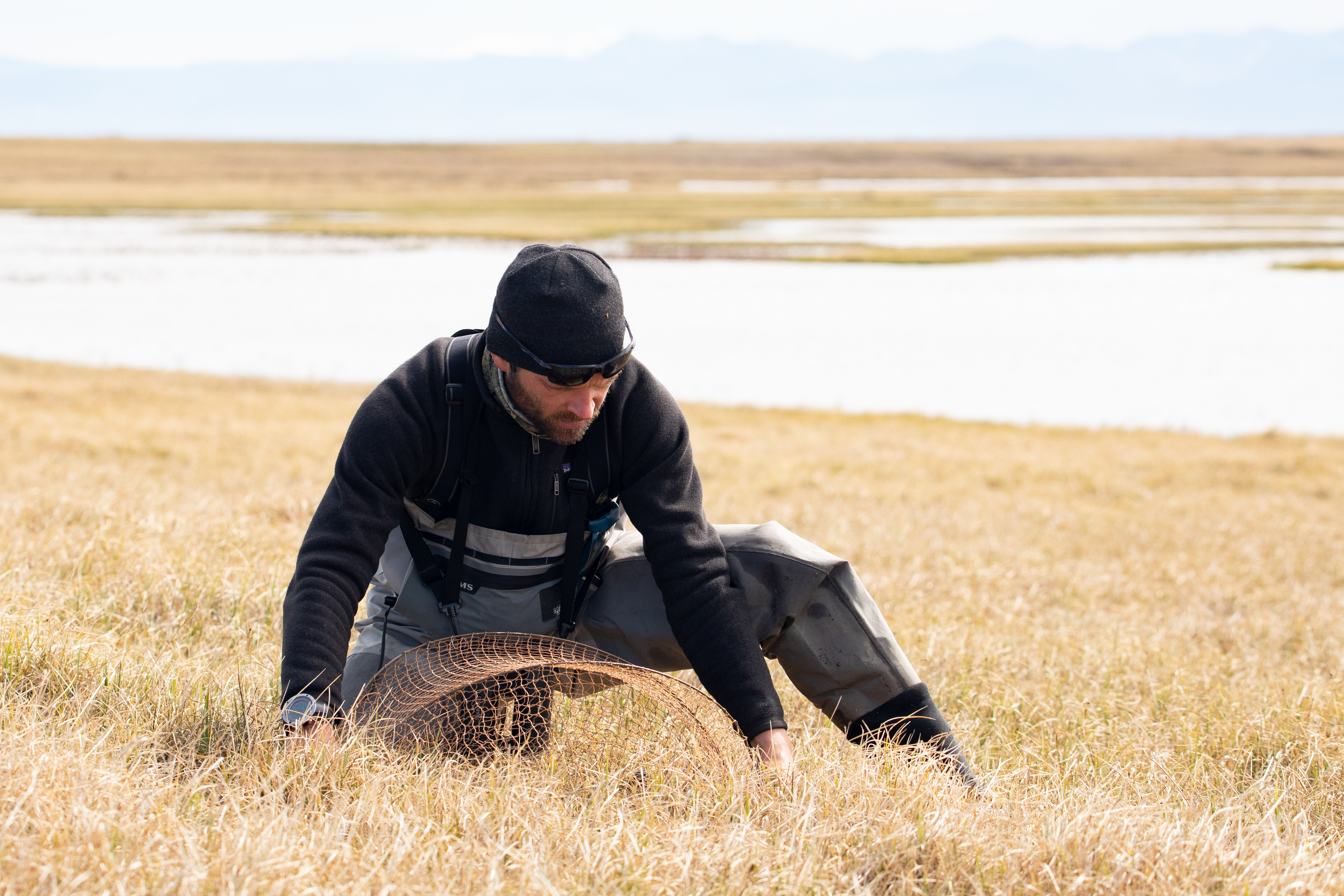
Manomet, Inc biologist setting a bownet to capture red phalarope.

In June 2010, Manomet published the Biomass Sustainability and Carbon Policy Study. The study, which was commissioned by the Massachusetts Department of Energy Resources, investigated questions about generating electricity from biomass fuel, including the net effect of biomass energy on atmospheric carbon balance. The study concluded that greenhouse gas emissions from burning wood are initially higher than from fossil fuels, but the carbon sequestered by regrowing forests can yield lower greenhouse gas levels over time.

Manomet is also known for its long-term shorebird research in the Arctic. In September 2010, the U.S. Fish and Wildlife Service selected Manomet to lead a $3 million, seven-month study to assess the impact on shorebirds from the massive Deepwater Horizon oil spill.
