= Doeskin Hill =

Hill in Framingham, Massachusetts, US

Highest point
- Elevation: 492 ft (150 m)
- Coordinates: 42°20′45″N 71°27′23″W

Geography
- Location: Middlesex County, Massachusetts
- Topo map: USGS Framingham

Doeskin Hill (also known as Doe Skin or Doescine or Doesiene Hill) is a 492-foot (150 m) hill in Framingham, Massachusetts. The hill is located west of Nobscot Hill near the border with Sudbury, Massachusetts. The hill is mentioned in the Massachusetts colonial records by at least 1658, and the name Doeskin (from the skin of a doe deer) originated as documented in the following testimony below:

"Hopestill Brown, Esq., of lawful age testifyeth and saith that for this sixty years he hath known the great hill adjoining to Sudbury south boundary to go by the name of Nobscot or Doeskin hill: that some of the improvement with some of the orchard in the possession of Joseph Berry in Framingham is on the westerly part of said hill: The deponent further saith that he heard his father say that Mr. Pelham and himself went up the hill above mentioned to take a prospect, and that Mr. Pelham lost a Doeskin glove on said hill, and that Mr. Pelham said, this hill shall be called Doeskin hill. Sworn to December 24, 1736."

Some early writers applied the "designation Doeskin to the whole range [of hills], and some seeming to apply it to the eastern hill," but it was eventually resolved to only apply to the hill west of Nobscot.

In 1946 it was considered as a possible site for the United Nations headquarters, along with 47 other sites in the metropolitan Boston area. By the twentieth century the area around the hill had been developed with houses and a nearby neighborhood was known as the Doeskin Hill Estates.
