= Nobscot Hill =

Hill in Framingham, Massachusetts, US

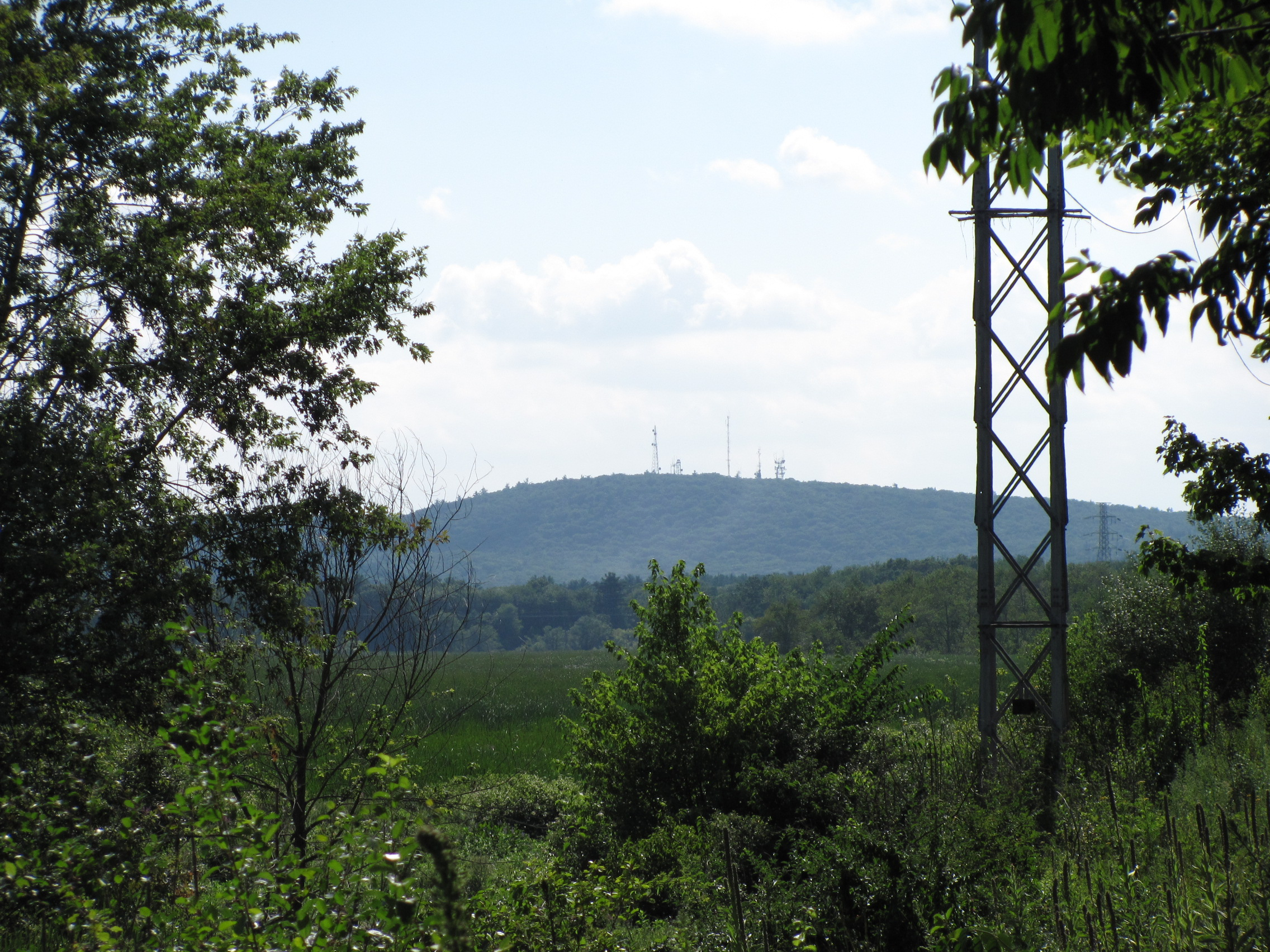
- View of Nobscot Hill from Wayland

Highest point
- Elevation: 600 ft (180 m)
- Coordinates: 42°20′45″N 71°26′57″W

Geography
- Location: Middlesex County, Massachusetts
- Topo map: USGS Framingham

Nobscot Hill is a USGS name for a high point in Middlesex County, Massachusetts, with many public hiking trails, and it is located in Framingham and Sudbury. At the summit are various radio towers and a fire tower. Below the summit of Nobscot Hill is the Nobscot Scout Reservation (452 acres), which includes Tippling Rock, a popular viewing location. Surrounding the hill are other large parks and parcels of conservation land, including the Nobscot Conservation Land (118 acres), Callahan State Park (958 acres), the Sudbury Weisblatt Conservation Land, and Wittenborg Woods (83 acres), which are connected by various hiking trails, including the Bay Circuit Trail.

== Geography ==
The summit of Nobscot Hill commands a 360-degree view, including Boston, MetroWest, the Blue Hills, Lower Kearsarge, Mount Monadnock, Mount Wachusett, Mount Agamenticus, and all of the unremarkable bumps to the SouthWest. Currently, the foliage obscures much of the view from the summit, unless one climbs the fire tower when it is open. However, other nearby viewing points, including Jethro's Table and Tippling Rock, offer unobstructed views of Boston. Other smaller hills surround Nobscot, including Doeskin Hill to the west, which was named in the seventeenth century after someone who lost a deerskin glove on the hill, and Tantamous Hill to the east, which was named after the medicine man who lived on Nobscot.

== History ==
By 1657, the area appeared in the records by the Nipmuc name "Penobscot" (meaning “Place of the Falling Rock”) and was later shortened to "Nobscot." Nobscot was considered a spiritual place for the Nipmuc people who resided in the area, and there was also a large stone cairn at the summit, which possibly served as a lookout area for the Indians. A Nipmuc medicine man named Tantamous, also known as Old Jethro, and his son, Peter Jethro and twelve others, lived on Nobscot Hill before King Philip’s War, when they were removed in 1675 to Deer Island. The Jethros had fruit orchards and cornfields on the sides of the hill, and many large Indian grinding stones are still viewable. Jethro's Field at Nobscot was referred to in the records by 1649, and references were also made to Peter's Field and Concubine's field in various deeds. Tippling Rock may have been used to communicate between local Indian villages (the rock was blasted in half in the early 20th century, possibly by a local farmer). Jethro also had a granary and a cairn (lookout), which was rebuilt in 1927 and was 8 feet in diameter and 5.5 feet tall, with a flat, smooth stone on top.

In the 1700s, Revolutionary War General John Nixon lived and farmed on the north side of Nobscot Hill, and the cellar hole of his house is viewable. During a 1792 outbreak of small-pox, a pest house was constructed at the base of Nobscot to quarantine the sick, and a small burial ground was built for victims who succumbed, and this cemetery and the cellar hole of the pest house may be visited today.

The area around Nobscot was used for farming for many years. Henry David Thoreau visited Nobscot in the 1850s and wrote about viewing the hill and a waterfall near it. In the 1920s and 1930s, Henry Ford purchased hundreds of acres of land around Nobscot Hill and the Wayside Inn to recreate an authentic early American village, similar to what he eventually built at Greenfield Village in Michigan. Ford constructed a large dam at the base of the hill in the 1930s to create a reservoir to support firefighting near his proposed village, but the dam failed to hold water and is now known as "Ford's Folly," and can be visited by the hiking trails around Nobscot. In 1928, the Boy Scouts purchased a large reservation on Nobscot Hill, which the organization still owns, but the area is open to the general public as invited guests. In 2008, a 303-acre (1.23 km^{2}) portion of the Nobscot Scout Reservation in Sudbury was permanently conserved by Sudbury Valley Trustees, the Town of Sudbury, and the Mayflower Council, Boy Scouts of America.

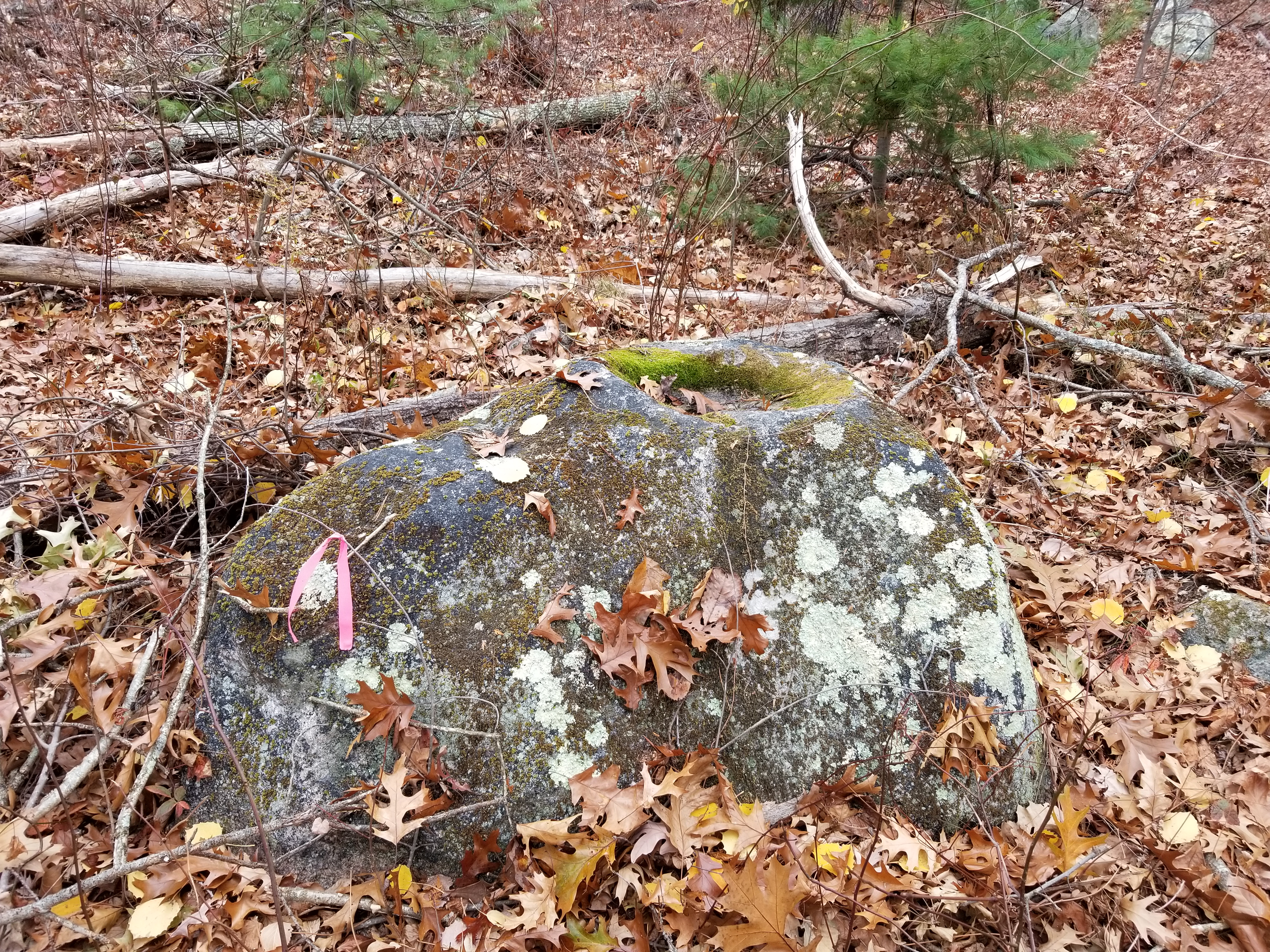
Native American corn grinding stone mortar on Legion Trail near Legion Cabin on Nobscot Hill at Nobscot Scout Reservation

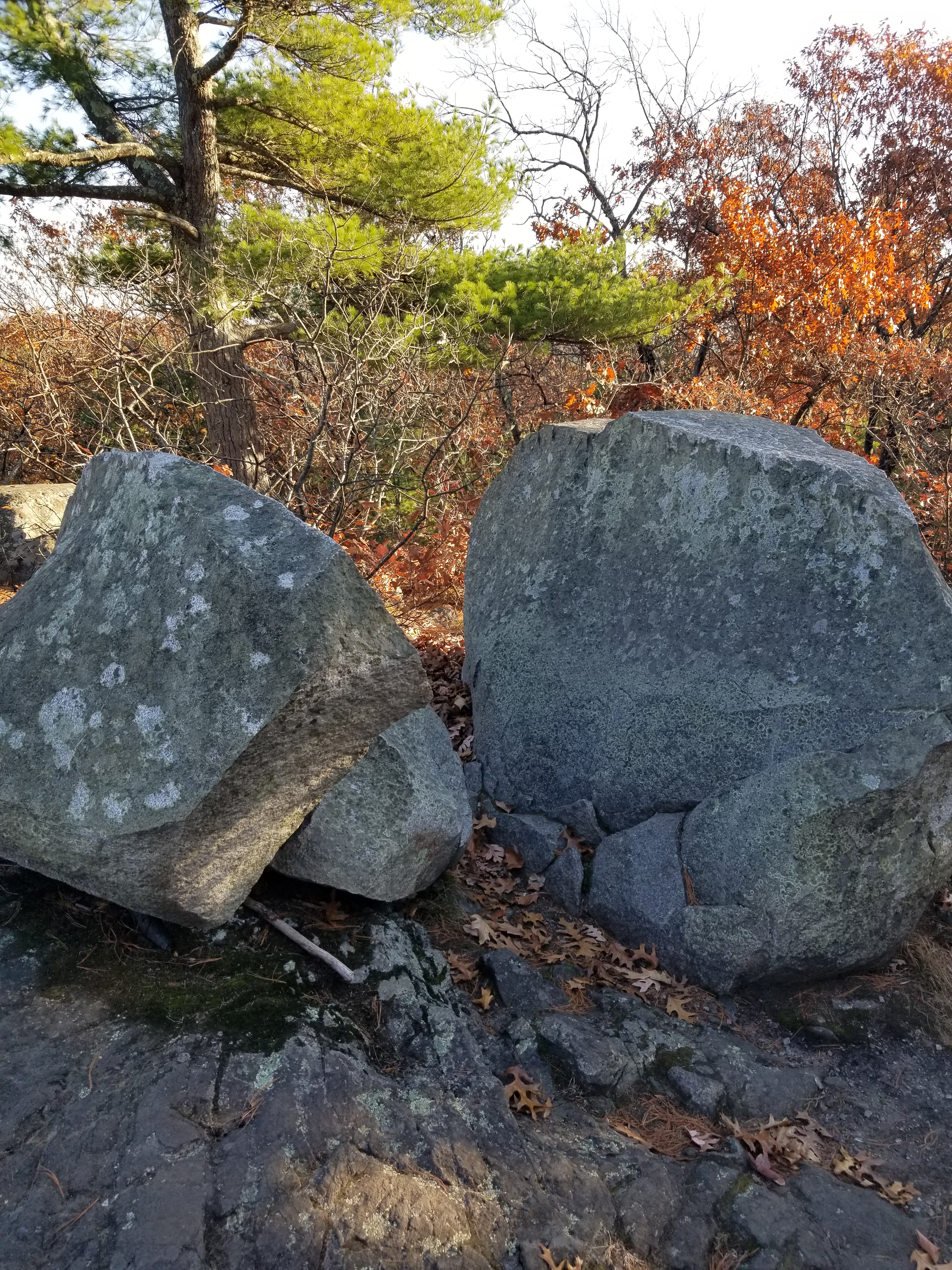
Tippling Rock split open in the early 20th century. Formerly used for communication between Native Americans.

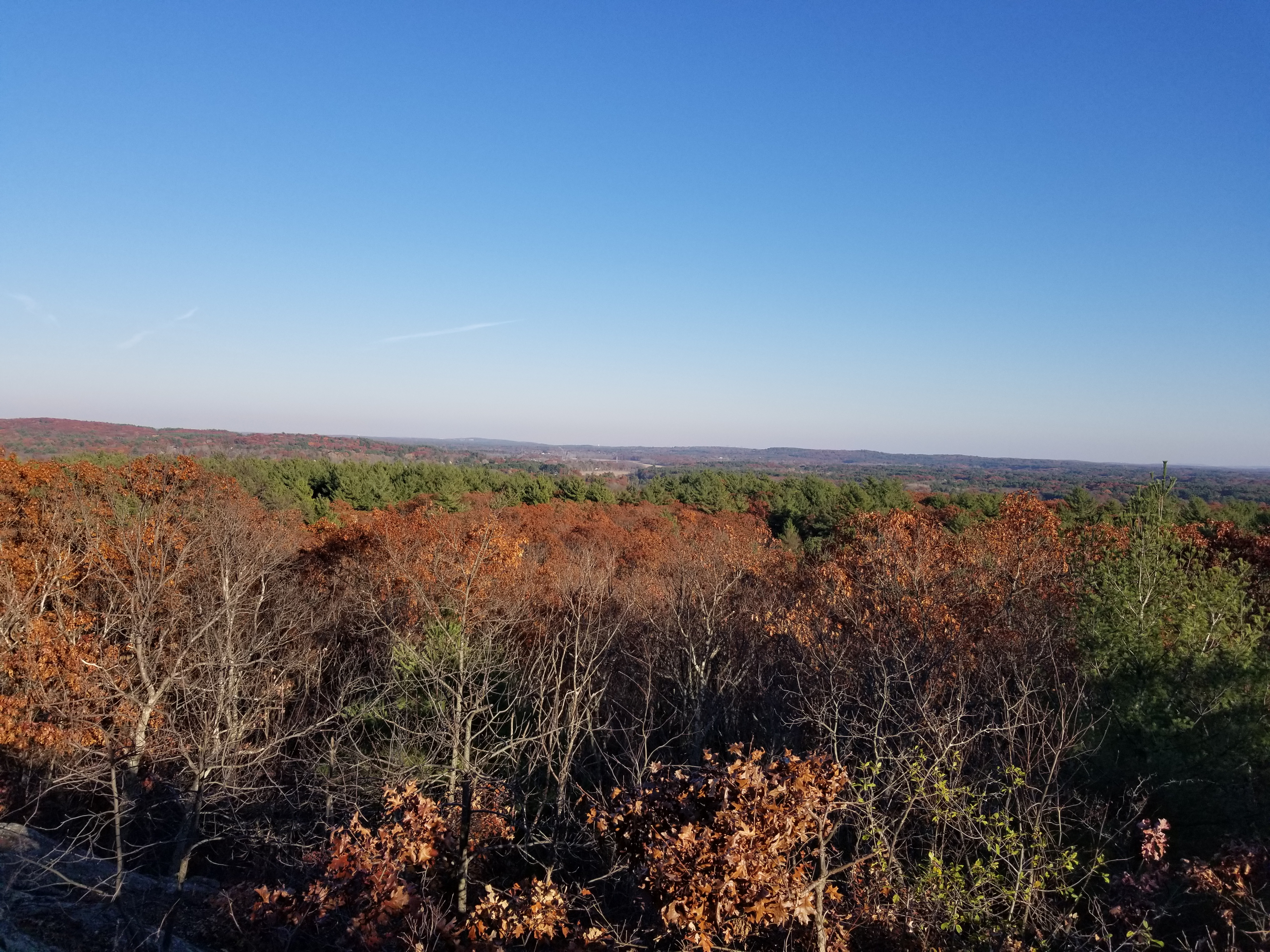
View from Tippling Rock in Sudbury near Nobscot Hill Reservation, looking toward Boston in the east

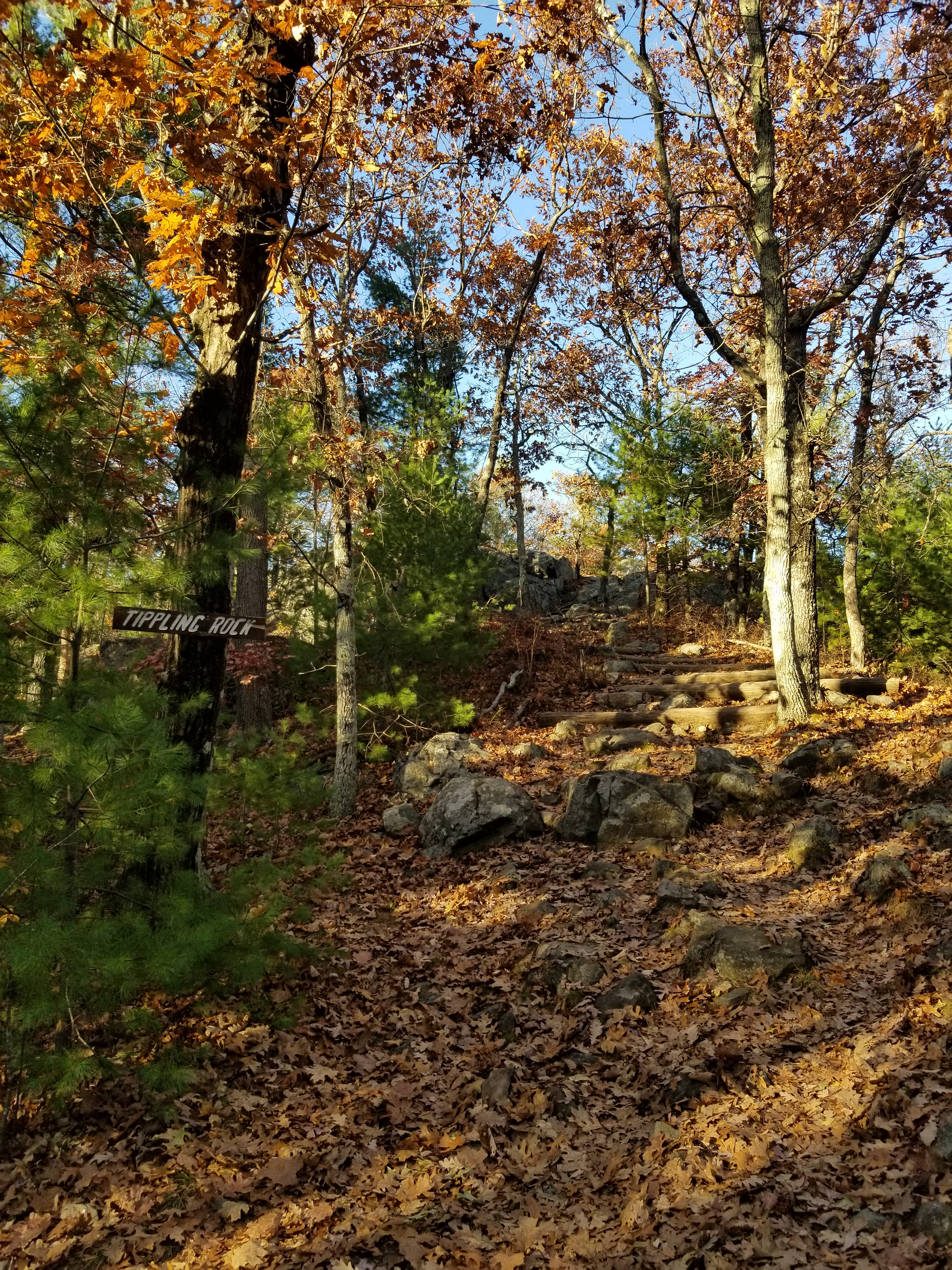
View up the hill toward Tippling Rock in Sudbury, Massachusetts, near Nobscot Hill Reservation

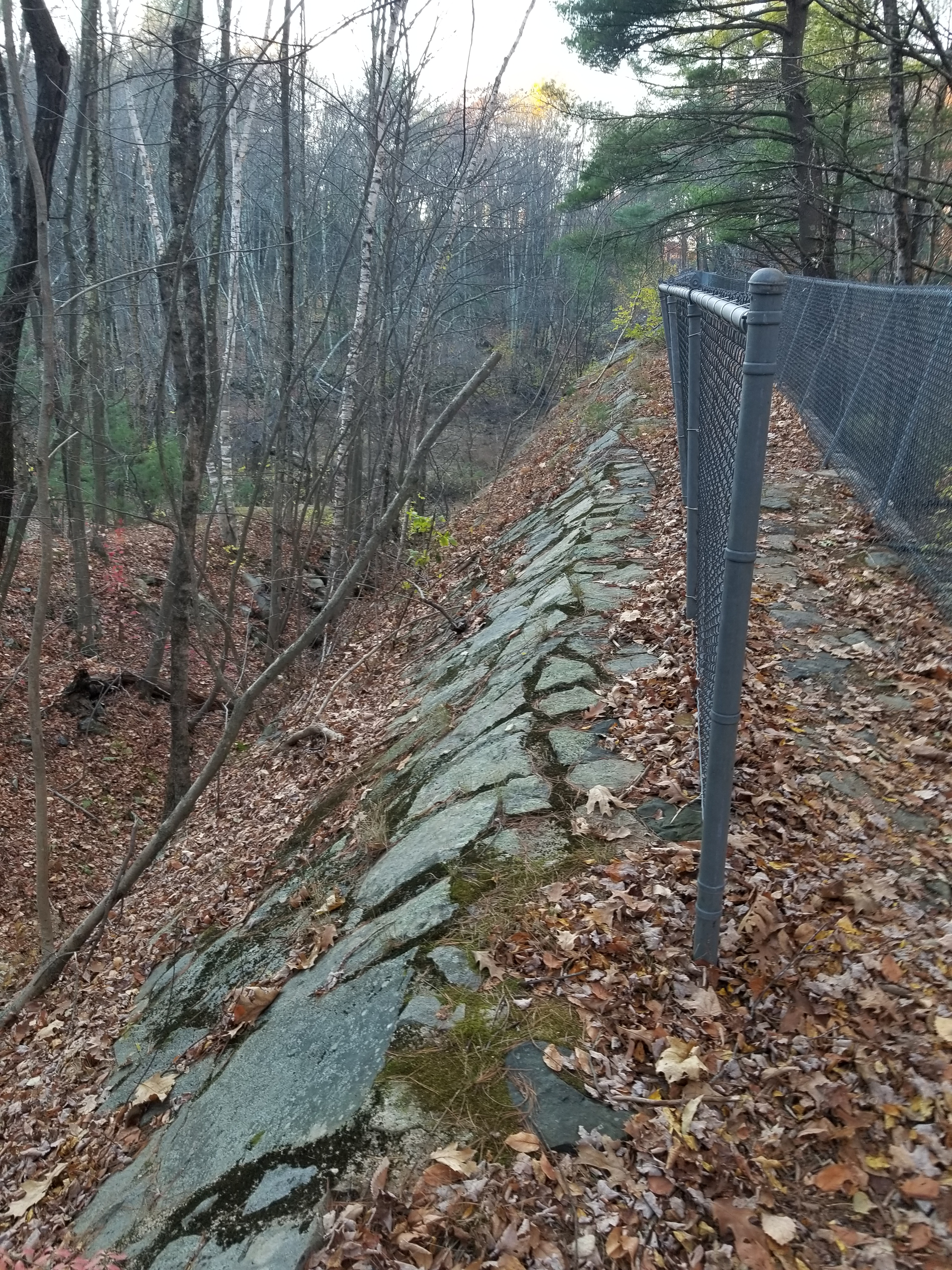
"Ford's Folly" dam built by Henry Ford near the base Nobscot Hill and across from the Wayside Inn in Sudbury

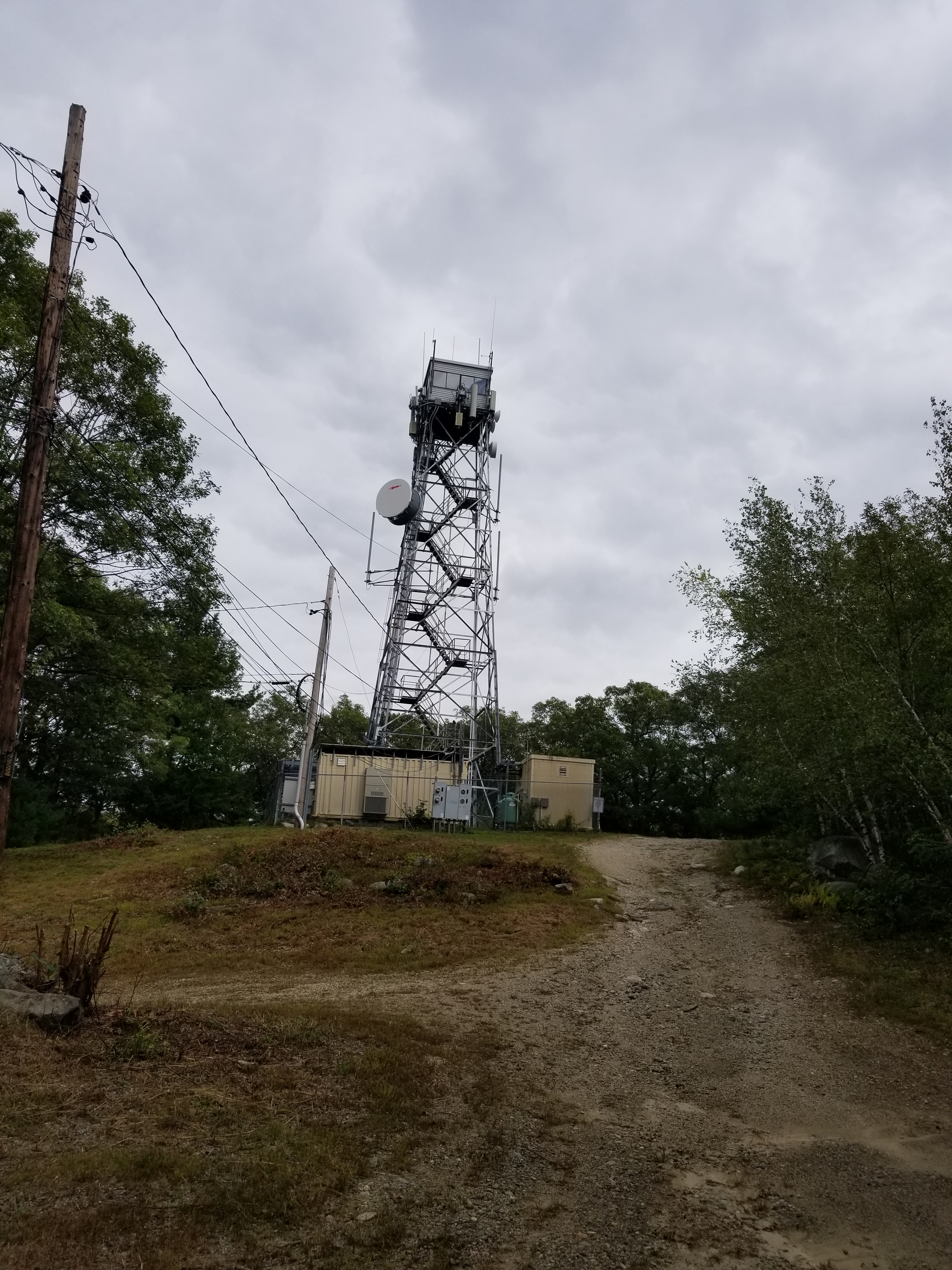
Fire lookout tower at summit of Nobscot

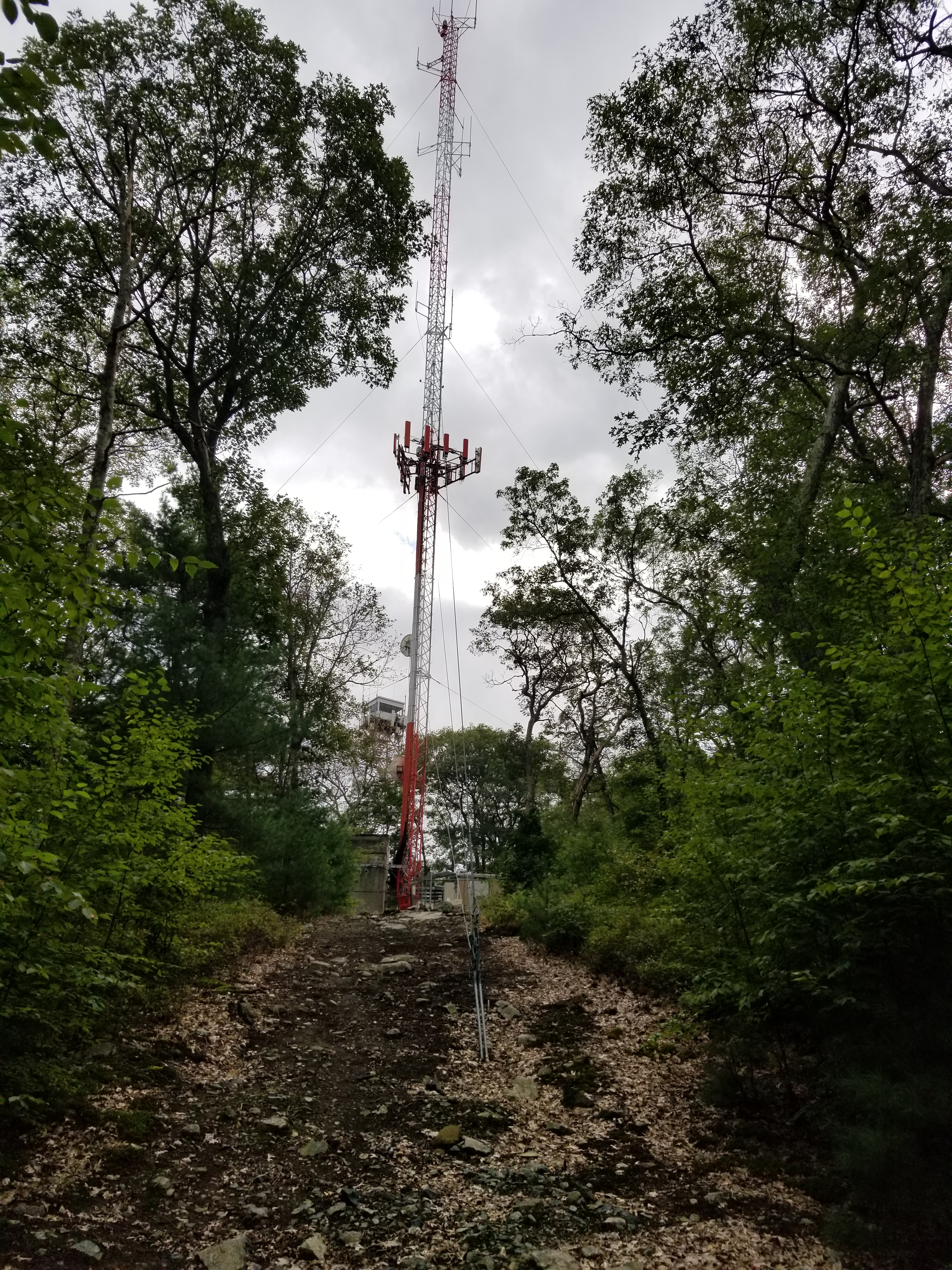
Nobscot Hill radio antenna

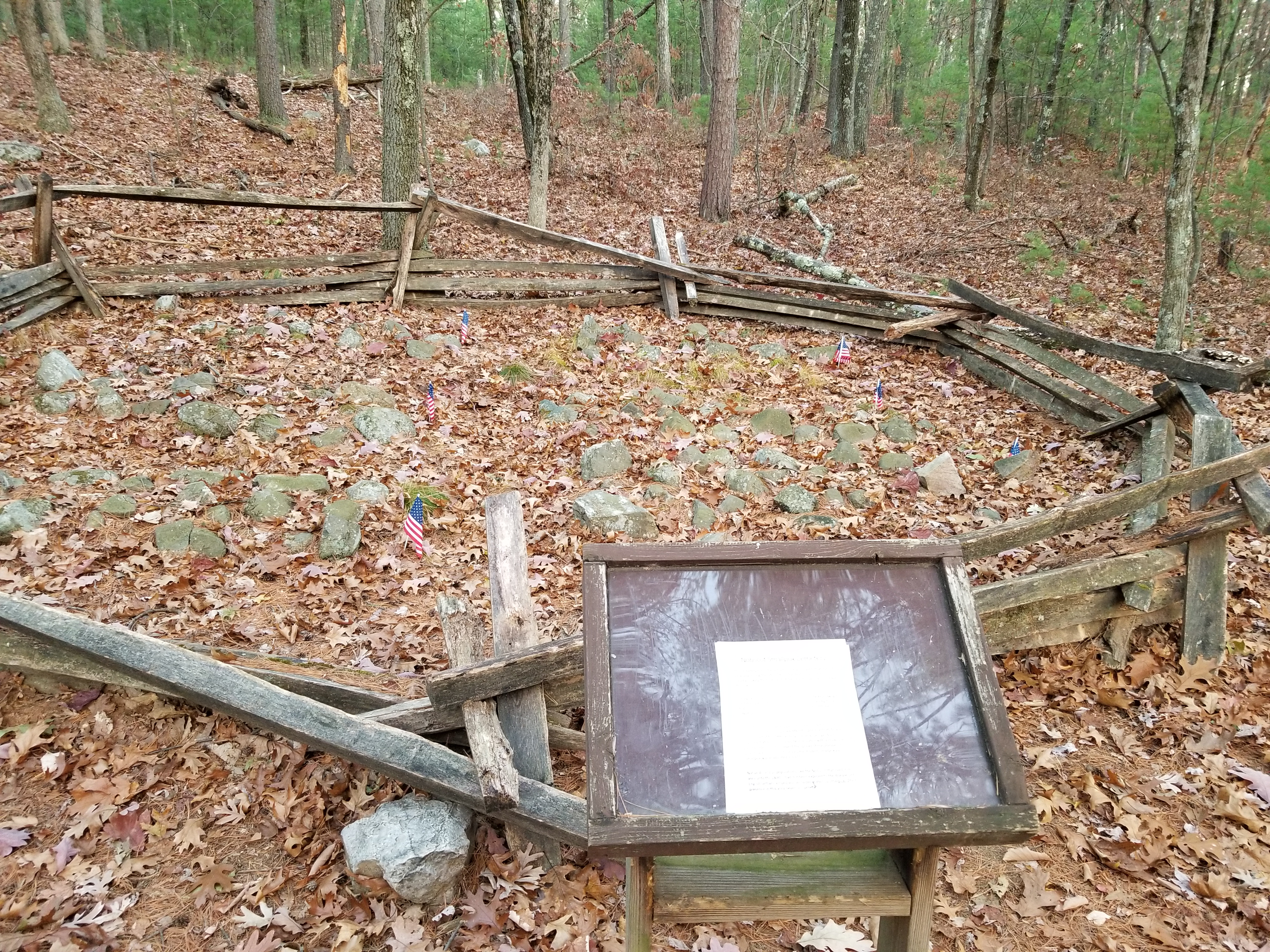
Smallpox burial ground

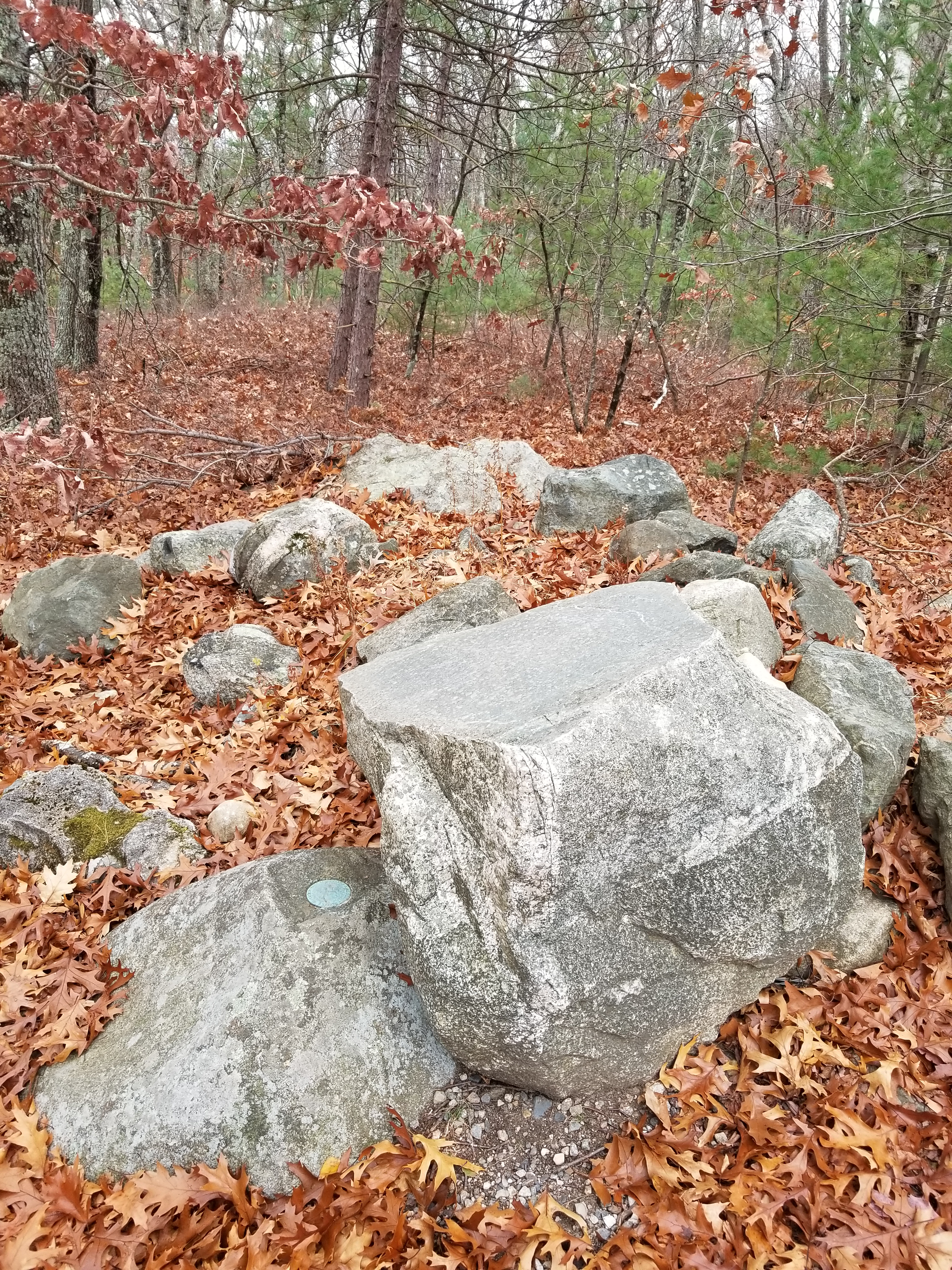
Summit marker embedded in rock with possible remnants of Indian Cairn

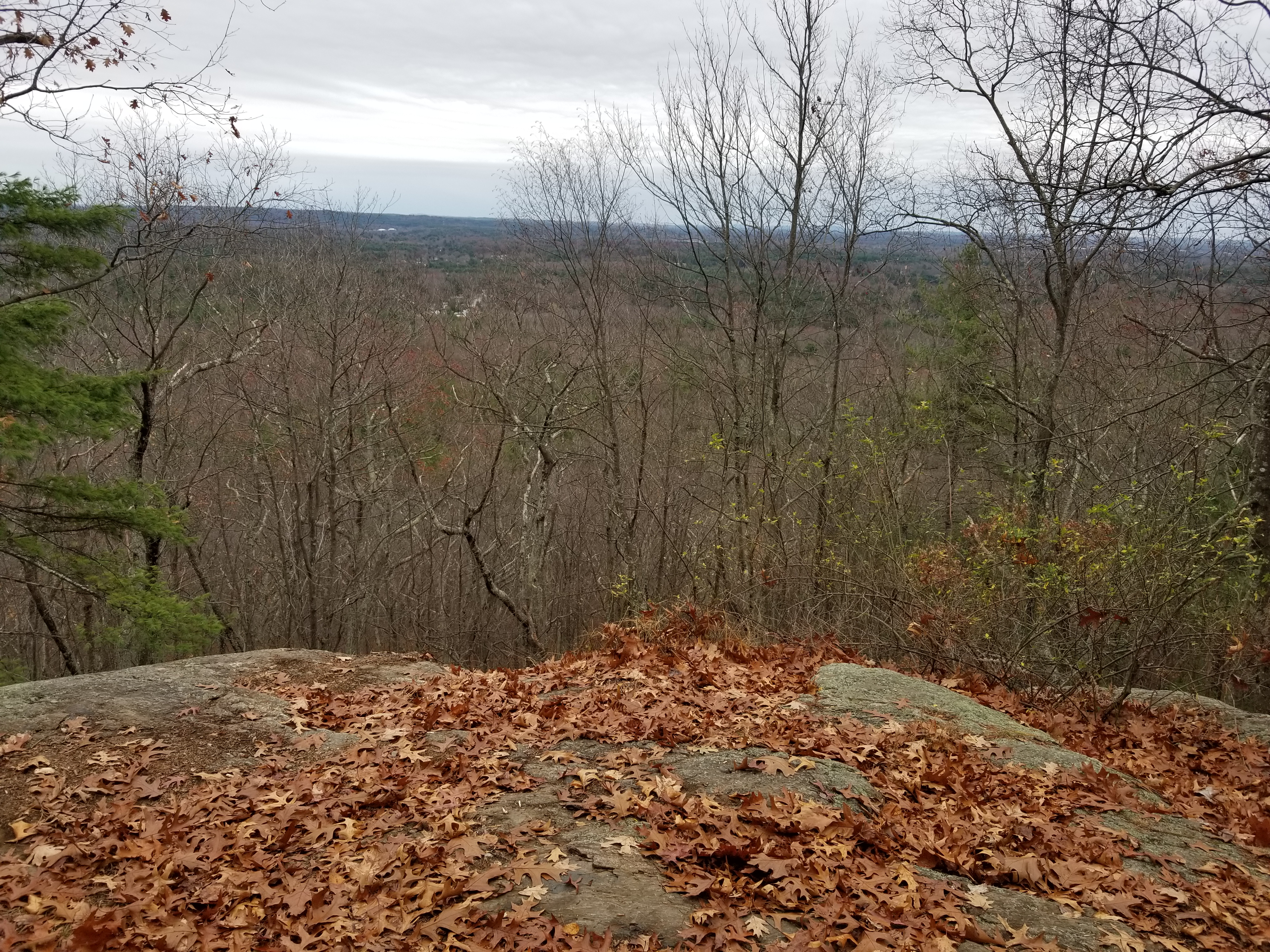
"Jethro's Table" viewing Ledge one minute southeast of Fire Tower on summit of Nobscot
