= Coast Guard Station Manomet Point =

Former US Coast Guard station in Massachusetts

- Part of 2nd District
- Plymouth, Massachusetts
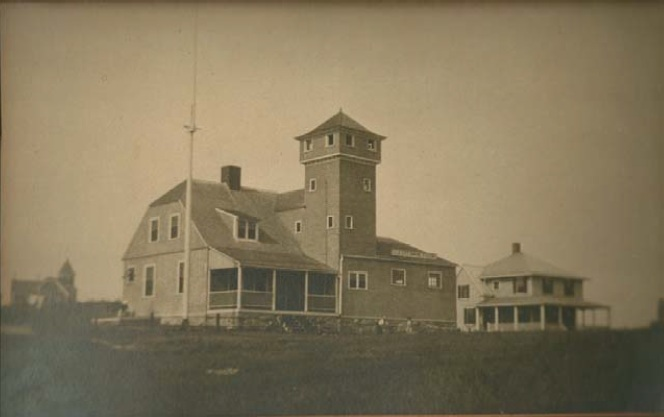
- The station, circa 1909

Site information
- Type: Coast Guard Station

Location
- Coordinates: 41°55′34.31″N 70°32′24.76″W

Site history
- Built: 1874
- In use: 1874–1947
- Demolished: 1955

United States Coast Guard Station Manomet Point was a United States Life-Saving Service station – and later a United States Coast Guard station – located on Manomet Point in Manomet, Massachusetts. The station was a sub-unit of Sector Southeast New England.

== History ==
USLSS Station No. 5, was built by the United States Life-Saving Service in 1874, Five and 3/8 miles south southeast of Gurnet Light, near the site of the old Mayflower Hotel. The first records indicate its location as being "on the west shore of Cape Cod Bay, seven miles southeast of Plymouth, Massachusetts." The station opened on October 15, 1874, with Stephen Holmes appointed as its first keeper. At the age of 37, Holmes already had 20 years' experience as a surfman.

The 1901 Annual Report of the USLSS mentions that "the old station at Manomet Point, Massachusetts, which was dilapidated and antiquated, has been replaced by a new building." That building was opened on April 1, 1901. In 1915, the USLSS was merged with the U.S. Revenue Cutter Service to form the U.S. Coast Guard (USCG). The station was subsequently designated USCG Station No. 31. An auxiliary boat and apparatus house was built in 1919, at the bottom of the hill close to the beach.

The 1874 T-Type station still exists as a private home in its original location. Some changes have been made to the building but most of the structural details are still in evidence.

This station was decommissioned in 1947, turned over to the General Services Administration in 1955 and ultimately dismantled. Most views of Station #31 show the front view with the boathouse on the right. The doors to the boathouse opened to the rear. When the Station was demolished in 1955 Carl Asker moved the boathouse and attached it to his house on State Road. The structure is still visible with the doors opening onto State Road.

== SS Robert E. Lee disaster ==
Three of Station No. 31's Guardsmen, Boatswain's Mate William Cashman and Surfmen Edward Stark and Frank Griswold, drowned after assisting the stricken Eastern Steamship Lines passenger liner SS Robert E. Lee. The Boston-to-New York-bound steamer, with 273 passengers and crew, grounded on the treacherous Mary Ann Rocks just southeast of Manomet Point during a gale at about 8 p.m. on Saturday, March 9, 1928.

Seven oarsman and Cashman tried again and again to reach the stricken ship via their oar-powered surf boat, but were held back by raging seas. (They were unaware that passengers and crew did not appear to be in imminent danger because the captain had securely scuttled the ship on the rocks). The Guardsmen ultimately reached the liner on March 10 and assisted in rescue efforts. The Guardsmen were on a return trip to the station when their surf boat overturned in "an unusually ponderous sea." Three drowned.

It was only one of the thousands of seas that the lifeboat had ridden buoyantly during the morning. But it caught her in a shoal place and it was an unusually ponderous sea. Its foot 'tripped' on the bottom and it towered high in the air, tilting the boat's bow down and flinging Cashman almost above the heads of his seven oarsmen.

Then the wave broke at the crest, and the boat was whirled over, the men dropping out, clutching at one another and at the great oars that were tumbling down with them. Hundreds of people were watching the boat, and a great cry went up from the crowd. People began to run down to the bowlder(sic)-strewn beach, helplessly enough, in their distress.

A number of young men watching from the shore secured small rowboats and rushed out to the stricken surf boat. Those rescuers were later awarded Carnegie Hero Fund Carnegie Medals for bravery.

Stark died en route to a Boston hospital; Cashman died on the beach after lengthy resuscitation by a doctor, and Griswold's body eventually washed ashore about two miles away. The five others were treated at hospitals in Plymouth and Chelsea.

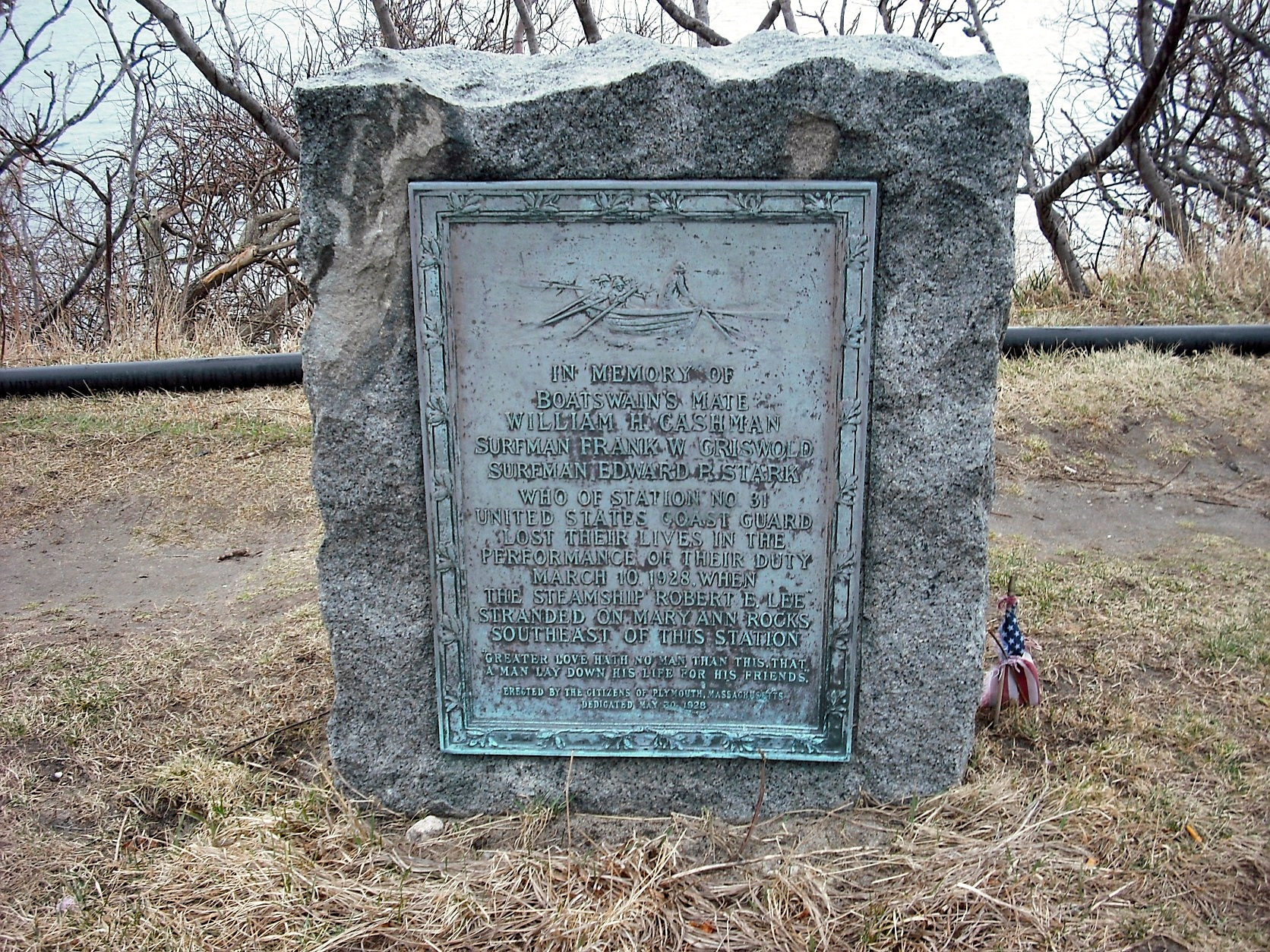
Memorial marker

A memorial plaque and stone monument for the fallen 3 heroes was installed at the tip of Manomet Point in May, 1928 by the citizens of Plymouth. It reads:

In memory of Boatswain's Mate William H. Cashman, Surfman Frank W. Griswold, Surfman Edward P. Stark, who of Station No. 31 United States Coast Guard lost their lives in the performance of their duty, March 10, 1928, when the Steamship Robert E. Lee stranded on the Mary Ann Rocks Southeast of this station.

Greater love hath no man than this, that a man lay down his life for his friends.

Community efforts were begun in March, 2010 to obtain formal hero status for the three fallen Coast Guardsmen from the government and military, and to improve the memorial site at the Point.

== See also ==
- List of military installations in Massachusetts
