= Shallow Pond (Plymouth, Massachusetts) =

Pond in Massachusetts

- Interactive map of Shallow Pond
- Location: Plymouth, Massachusetts
- Coordinates: 41°53′22.64″N 70°33′11.71″W
- Basin countries: United States
- Surface area: 18 acres (7.3 ha)
- Surface elevation: 30 feet (9.1 m)
- Settlements: Shallow Pond Estates neighborhood of Manomet

Shallow Pond is an 18-acre (73,000 m^{2}) pond in the Manomet section of Plymouth, Massachusetts, USA. It is located south of Fresh Pond, north of Briggs Reservoir, southwest of Cedar Bushes and west of Manomet Beach. The water quality is impaired due to non-native aquatic plants and nuisance exotic species.

== Shallow Pond Estates ==
Shallow Pond Estates is a neighborhood that abuts the northern shore of the pond and spreads eastward to Route 3A south of Cedar Bushes.
