= Vallerville, Massachusetts =

Village in Massachusetts, United States

Coordinates: 41°52′12″N 70°32′10″W

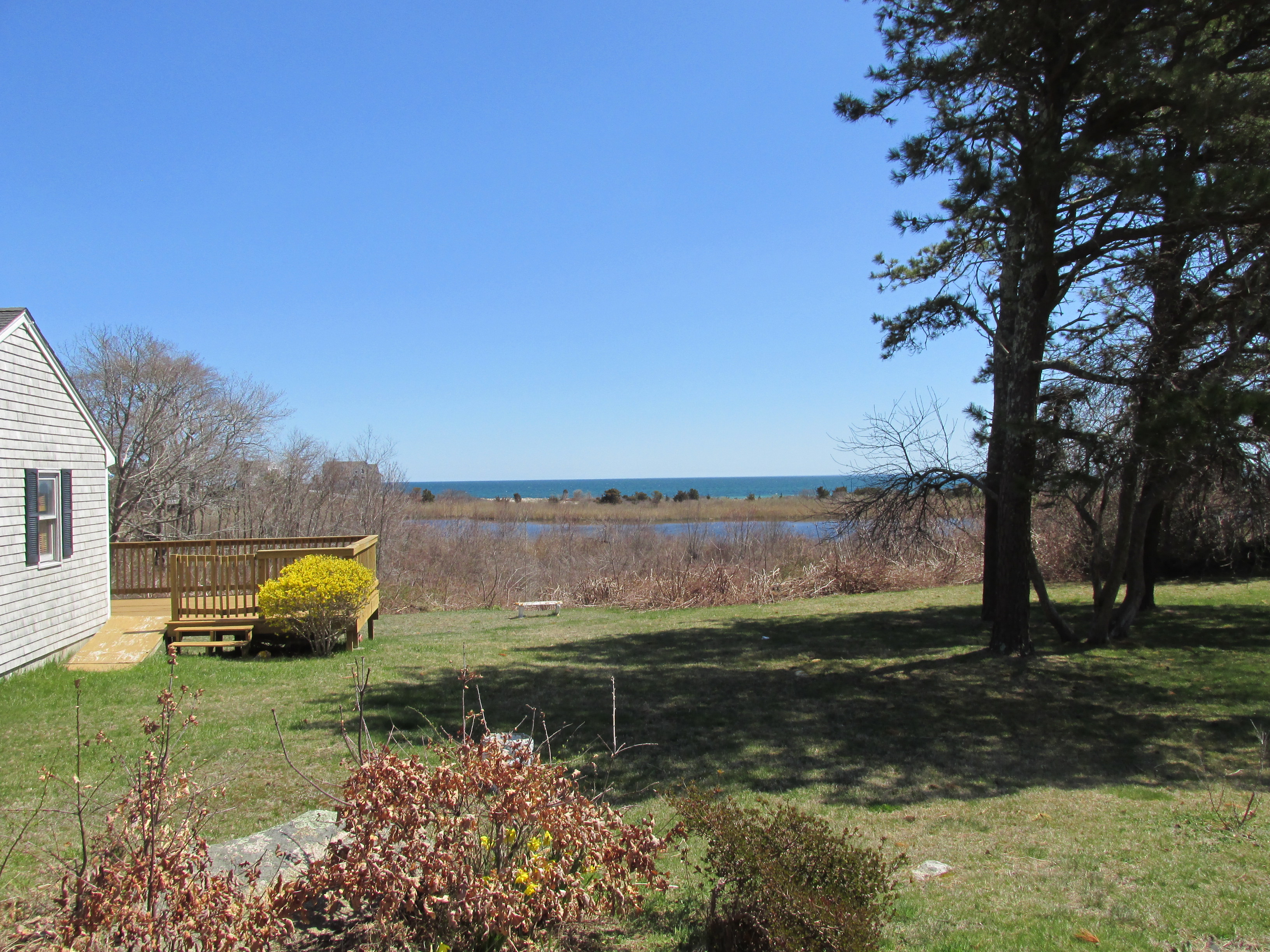
Ocean View

Vallerville, also called Vallersville or Valorville, is a village in Plymouth, Massachusetts, United States. It is the smallest village in the town, located south of the village of Manomet and north of the village of Ellisville. The neighborhoods of Ocean Aire Beach, Surfside Beach and Bayside Beach are located within Vallerville.

== See also ==
- Neighborhoods in Plymouth, Massachusetts
