= Mayflower Council =

Scouting America local council

- Owner: Scouting America
- Headquarters: Milford, Massachusetts
- Country: United States
- Founded: 2017
- President: Ian Johnson
- Council Commissioner: Rich Carlson
- Scout Executive: Juan Osorio
- Website www.mayflowerbsa.org

The Mayflower Council of the Scouting America serves the MetroWest and southeastern regions of Massachusetts.

== History ==
On March 28, 2017, Knox Trail Council and Old Colony Council voted to merge and create a new, combined council. The merger was executed on May 10, 2017, using the name "Council 251" to represent the new council until August 30, 2017, when the name "Mayflower Council" was selected. The council was headquartered at the former Knox Trail Council headquarters in Marlborough, Massachusetts, and the former Old Colony Council headquarters in Canton, Massachusetts was used as a satellite location. On October 2, 2020, the council moved into its new service center at 83 Cedar Street in Milford. Massachusetts.

== Districts ==
Mayflower Council has one District called Mayflower District.

== Camps ==
Mayflower Council owns and operates 3 camps. They are Camp Squanto within Myles Standish State Forest in Plymouth, Massachusetts, Camp Resolute in Bolton, Massachusetts, and Nobscot Scout Reservation on Nobscot Hill in Sudbury, Massachusetts.

=== Camp Squanto ===
Camp Squanto is a 650-acre (2.6 km^{2}) camping facility located in Plymouth, Massachusetts, deep in the woods of Myles Standish State Forest. For seven weeks in the summer trained staff run a long-term camping experience for troops and individuals totalling nearly 2,000. During other weekends throughout the year, Camp Squanto is available to various groups and activities, such as Troop or Webelos camping, band camps, retreats, Order of the Arrow events, Klondike Derbies, Parent-Son Weekends, among others. The camp attracts 20,000 weekend visitors annually.

==== 1925–1949: Bloody Pond ====
Although the Brockton Council of the Boy Scouts of America, the precursor of the Squanto Council, was formed in 1919, the first Camp Squanto was not opened until 1925.

The new camp was located on an 18.5-acre (75,000 m^{2}) site on the west side of Bloody Pond in Plymouth, Massachusetts. In the spring of 1925, after an old farmhouse on the property was taken down, a combined dining and recreation hall was built. This building had facilities for 125 campers and staff, including a stone fireplace, a kitchen, storerooms, and an office for the camp.

A waterfront area with a U-shaped swimming dock, a lookout tower, and a fleet of canoes and rowboats was set up on the shore of the pond. An old bog on the former farm was converted into a sports field, and a campfire ring was built on a knoll near the waterfront. Parking and service areas were laid out in the rear of the dining hall, and an old farm woodshed was repaired for use as a crafts center during the camping season as well as off-season storage.

The first camping season started in the first week of July 1925. It was decided to call the new facility Camp Squanto, in honor of the Patuxet Indian, Tisquantum, whose aid to the Pilgrims in Plymouth helped them survive the first few difficult years of their settlement.

Although the first Scouts to camp at Camp Squanto lived in tents, these were gradually replaced with Adirondack shelters. The Scouts were divided into tribes, the Dakota, Comanche, Blackfoot, and Apache, thus establishing a tradition of naming campsites after various Indian tribes which continues today at Camp Squanto.

In 1932, the Brockton Scout Council which had previously included only the city of Brockton was expanded to take in the surrounding communities of Abington, Avon, Bridgewater, Duxbury, Halifax, Hanover, Hanson, Kingston, Marshfield, Pembroke, Plymouth, Plympton, Rockland, West Bridgewater, and Whitman and the new council adopted the Squanto name.

==== 1950–present: Fawn Pond ====
In the 1940s, the increased number of Scouts in the Squanto Council could no longer be accommodated with the limited facilities at the Bloody Pond site and a search was started for a larger area. In 1948/1949, a site containing several 100 acres (400,000 m^{2}) was found which included the north and west shores of Fawn Pond in Plymouth. This land was given to the council by LeBaron R. Barker, a local cranberry grower and landowner.

In July 1949 a group of staff leaders and Scouters surveyed the new area and marked out the locations for future development. in the fall of the same year, a formal survey and layout of the camp was made. Since the winter of 1949/1950 was a mild one, many of the Scout troops in the council were able to work at cutting out brush and trees to prepare the sites for buildings and roads.

During the spring of 1950, some thirty-five new buildings were put up with the help of construction crews and the Engineering Service of the National Boy Scout Council. The first building constructed was the Director's Lodge, followed by the Staff/Office/Trading Post, and the Health Lodge.

The Dining Hall was put up in May and June and was ready for the opening of camp in July. In the meantime, lean-tos, toilets, a craft building, and winter lodges were built throughout the camp. With the completion of the chapel near the waterfront in the second week of the camp season, the first phase of development in the new camp was over.

In addition to the many buildings, a water system, sewage system, unit camping areas, a waterfront area, sports area, campfire/amphitheater, nature study areas, rifle and archery range, and other facilities were set up to make Camp Squanto one of the key camps in the region.

During the 1950s and 1960s, the Squanto Spirit made itself evident in many ways. The Feast of Mondamin, an interpretation of the Song of Hiawatha paying tribute to the Great Spirit of the Indian nations, attracted over 2,000 spectators and was broadcast on the Boston television stations. Each of the troops in camp built a mound or small hill, reflecting the activities of various Indian tribes which had contributed to the history and growth of the philosophy of brotherhood which characterizes the Spirit of Squanto.

In later years, this Feast of Mondamin was incorporated into the camp opening and closing ceremonies, which are witnessed annually by the campers, Scout leaders, parents, and families. This yearly reminder of the Spirit which is Squanto continues to be one of the highlights of each camping season at Camp Squanto.

The Spirit of Squanto showed itself again during this period when the adjoining Camp Cachalot was burnt to the ground by a forest fire which ravaged the area but spared most of Camp Squanto. The staff, Scout campers, and Scout leaders of Camp Cachalot were made welcome at Camp Squanto and shared the camp facilities until their own camp could be rebuilt.

One of the most active areas of camp during these years was the waterfront. The natural sandy beach on Fawn Pond was cleaned and extended to provide space for additional aquatic activities. The first watch tower was built out of logs by the camp staff. Later, with funds from the George W. Magee Memorial Fund, a more permanent tower was put up. Although the design of the dock and the composition of the waterfront fleet has changed over the years, some of the original boats and canoes are still in use after providing thousands of hours of pleasure and instruction to many Scouts during the years. Some of the most popular of these watercraft were the "whaleboats," old Navy launches which were donated as training craft and swimming platforms.

With the opening of camp in July 1950, a new era of camping in the Squanto Council was initiated. Since then, Camp Squanto has continued to grow, improve, and provide for the needs of Scouts and Scouters. An important factor in this growth has been the Squanto spirit, which has distinguished the camp since its beginnings. This growth has been especially pronounced from 1969 to the present time.

In 1970, the Squanto Council and the Old Colony Council merged. The tremendous growth in Scout attendance at camp coupled with the need for year-round building maintenance was recognized, and a year-round camp ranger was hired. Since the new Old Colony council took in most of the South Shore of Massachusetts from Weymouth and Braintree on the north to Plymouth in the south and Walpole on the west with a total of 41 towns, the need for more open space to provide for the needs of the Scouts and Scouters in the area became very real.

One of the first acts of the new council was the purchase of additional area abutting Fawn Pond which made it possible for the camp to control two-thirds of the land around the pond. An added bonus was the working cranberry bog included in the purchase. With the help of the Order of the Arrow and countless other volunteers, all the camp buildings were repaired and repainted.

=== Camp Resolute ===
Camp Resolute is a 325-acre (1.32 km^{2}) camp located on Little Pond in Bolton, Massachusetts. The camp was founded in 1919 on the shores of Little Pond. The facility offers many activities for campers to do such as swimming, boating, hiking, rock climbing, rappelling, and ropes courses. It is the only Boy Scout camp in New England and one of 8 in the country to be accredited by the American Camping Association. Officially named the E. Paul Robsham Scout Reservation, the camp celebrated its 100th anniversary in 2019. The Boy Scout camp occupies one half of the lake while the reservations Cub Scout day camp occupies the other.

== Tantamous Lodge ==
Tantamous Lodge
- Founded: 2017
- Lodge Adviser: Mike O'Keeffe
- Staff Adviser: Jack Colamaria
- Website http://www.tantamous.org

Mayflower Council's Order of the Arrow lodge is Tantamous #223, which was formed from Old Colony Council's Tisquantum Lodge #164 and Knox Trail Council's Chippanyonk Lodge #59 when the councils merged in 2017.

=== Serves areas ===
Tantamous Lodge was formerly separated into five chapters that served their respective districts now after some work that are serves area. :

- East Serves Area
- North serves Area
- West serves area
- South Serves area

== See also ==
- Scouting in Massachusetts
