= Manomet, Massachusetts =

Village in Massachusetts, United States

Coordinates: 41°55′07″N 70°34′00″W

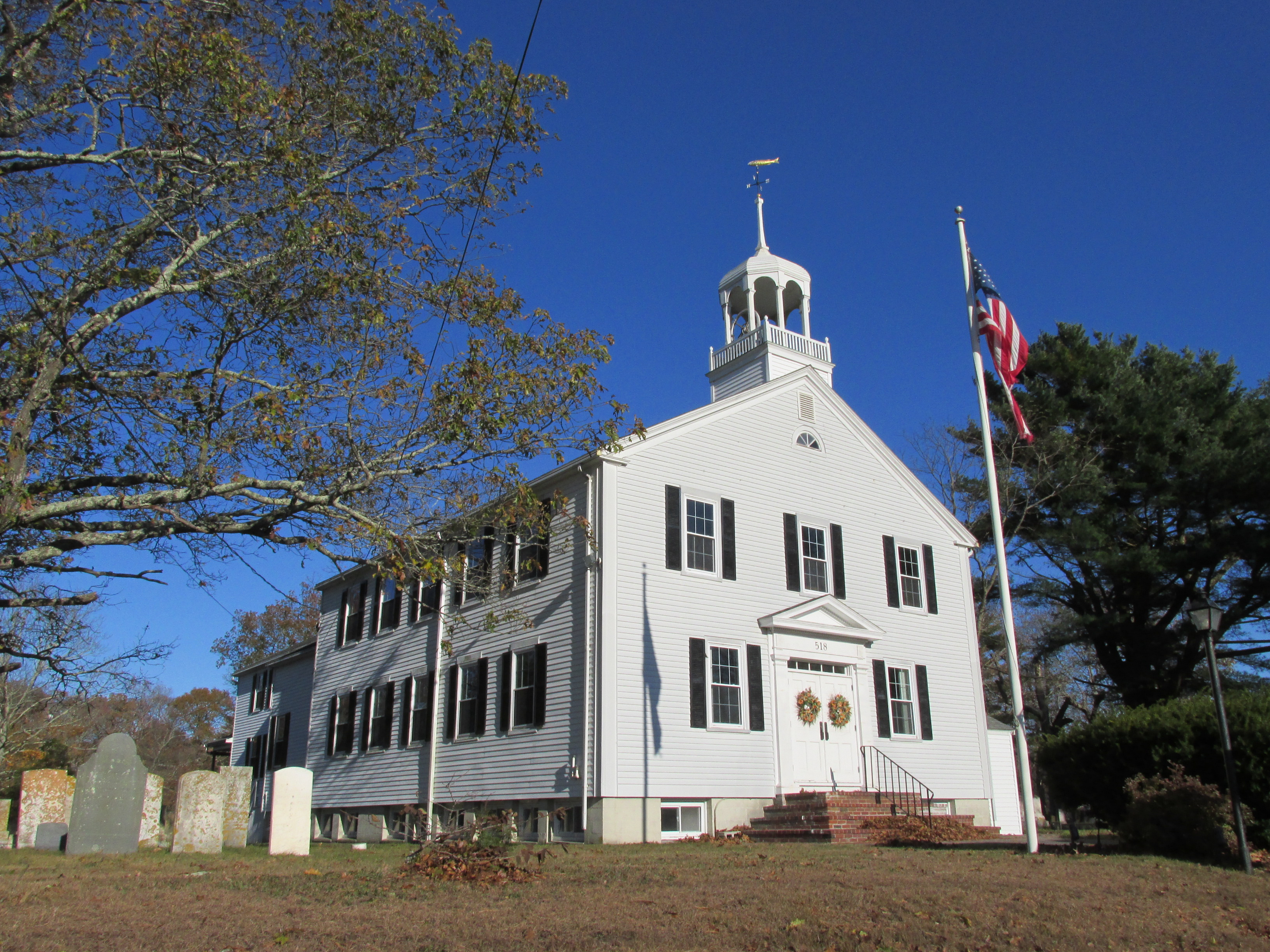
The Second Church of Plymouth at Manomet

Manomet is a seaside village of Plymouth, Massachusetts, United States. It is named for the Wampanoag village of Manomet, located among the Manomet Ponds (the later site of the Manomet Ponds Praying Town). Manomet has a Post Office in the business district whose ZIP code is 02345. Residents and businesses in this village that are non-Post Office box holders use Plymouth's ZIP code of 02360.

Manomet is also home to Manomet Center for Conservation Sciences, a global conservation and sustainability nonprofit organization.

== Activities and recreation ==
Today, Manomet is known for its Independence Day celebrations, which actually take place one day early, on the 3rd of July. The celebrations usually consist of private bonfires, fireworks, and a typically family oriented crowd. Manomet's July 3 celebration of Independence Day extends back to the 1800s, when residents burned scrap and driftwood on the beach. Tradition dictates that these bonfires be extinguished by the rising tide, so depending on the moon, the festivities may extend well into the night, or end relatively early. The 3rd of July celebrations are featured in a song called "Manomet (On The 3rd Of July)" written by longtime Manomet resident Tedd Rodman.

== Neighborhoods and beaches ==
Manomet consists of the following neighborhoods:

- Manomet Heights
- Manomet Bluffs (strictly private)
- Fisherman's Landing (strictly private)
- Churchill Landing (strictly private)
- Indian Bluffs Improvement Association (CCA) (strictly private)
- Shallow Pond Estates
- Cedar Bushes (strictly private)
- Manomet Beach (strictly private)
- Indian Brook (strictly private)
- Ocean Aire (strictly private)
- White Horse Beach (public beach/private parking)
- Priscilla Beach (strictly private)

== Landmarks ==
Manomet landmarks include:

- Coast Guard Station Manomet Point, a former United States Coast Guard station which although no longer there has a stone memorial to deceased surfmen
- Stage Point

== See also ==
- Neighborhoods in Plymouth, Massachusetts
