= Franciscan Center =

Franciscan Center may refer to:

- Franciscan Center of Baltimore
- Franciscan Center of Tampa
