= Sullivan's Castle Island =

Restaurant in Boston, Massachusetts, U.S.

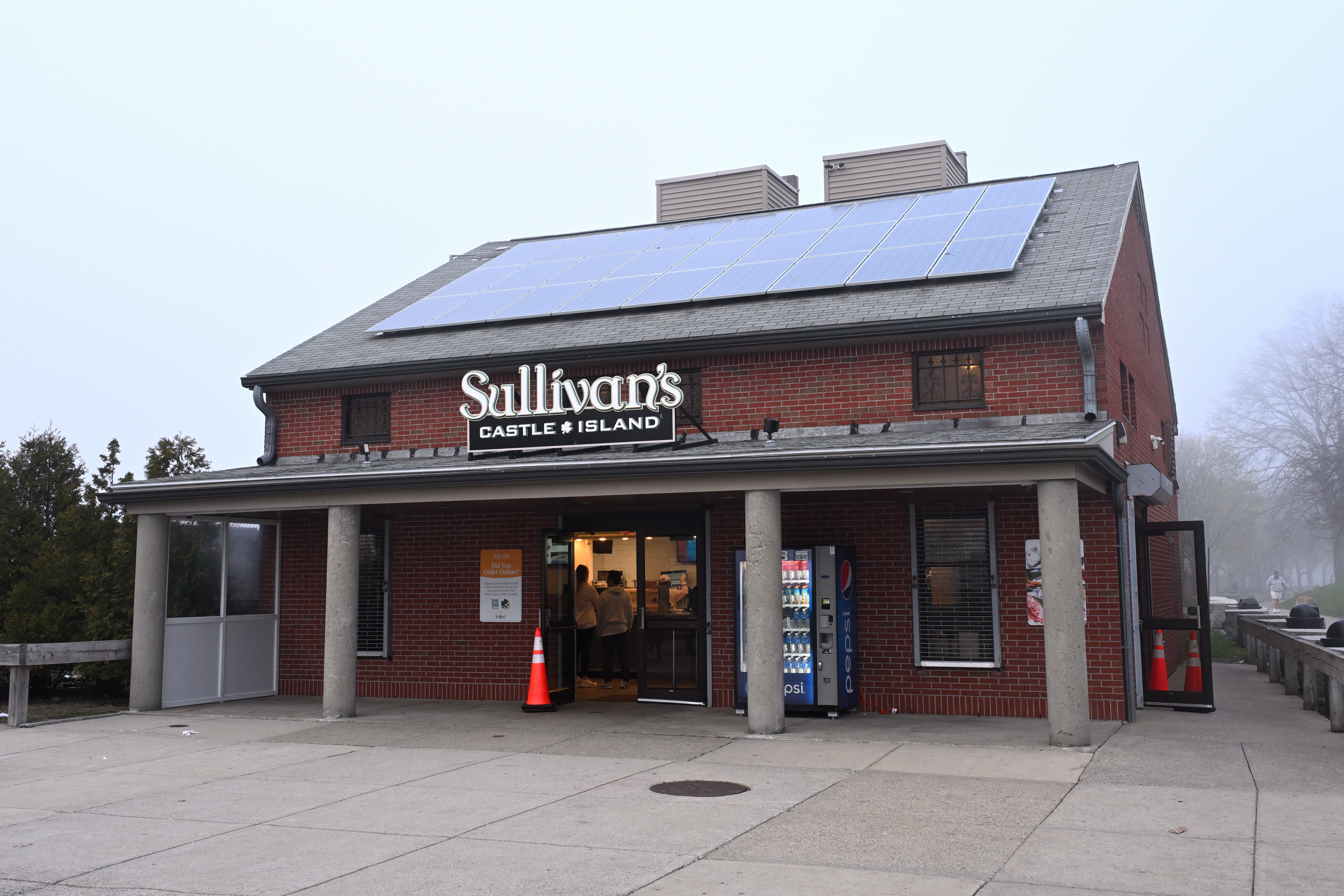
- Interactive map of Sullivan's Castle Island

Restaurant information
- Owner: Brendan Sullivan
- Location: Boston, Massachusetts, United States
- Coordinates: 42.33888°N 71.01318°W
- Other locations: Hanover, Massachusetts, United States
- Website: https://www.sullivanscastleisland.com/

Sullivan's Castle Island, commonly referred to as Sully's, is a restaurant in Boston, Massachusetts. The restaurant was founded in 1951 as a concession stand for the nearby Fort Independence, and typically operates seasonally from early spring into late fall. It sits across the water from Logan International Airport.

The restaurant was named one of "America's Classics" by the James Beard Foundation in 2025. The ruins of the restaurant are featured as an unmarked location in the 2015 video game Fallout 4. In 2023, another location opened in Hanover, Massachusetts, with a larger menu and a bar.

== Menu ==
Sullivan’s menu is divided into 7 categories: dessert, beverages, sides, chicken, handheld, seafood, and seafood dinners. According to the restaurant, they are most well known for their hot dogs, crinkle cut fries, lobster rolls, seafood, and double smash burgers, which they offer as both cheeseburgers and hamburgers.

== Hanover Crossing ==
On March 21, 2023, Sullivan’s opened a permanent location (the South Boston location closing every winter, only operating from early spring through November,) in Hanover, Massachusetts, in Hanover Crossing, an outdoor lifestyle center. Differences between the Hanover location and the Boston location include: The Hanover location being a restaurant, as opposed to a snack bar. The Boston location only serves via a walk-up window. The Hanover location serves alcohol and has a bar. The Boston location having waterfront views.
