= Clark Airport (Massachusetts) =

- IATA: none; ICAO: none

Summary
- Operator: Private
- Location: Hanover, Massachusetts
- Built: Unknown
- In use: 1927-1941; 1945-1958
- Occupants: Private
- Elevation AMSL: 71 ft / 22 m
- Coordinates: 42°6′13.78″N 70°51′57.16″W
- Interactive map of Clark Airport

Clark Airport was an airfield operational in the mid-20th century in Hanover, Massachusetts. During the time it was closed during World War II, the Pilgrim Ordnance Works was located to the west of the airport.
