= Dana Barron =

American actress (b. 1966)

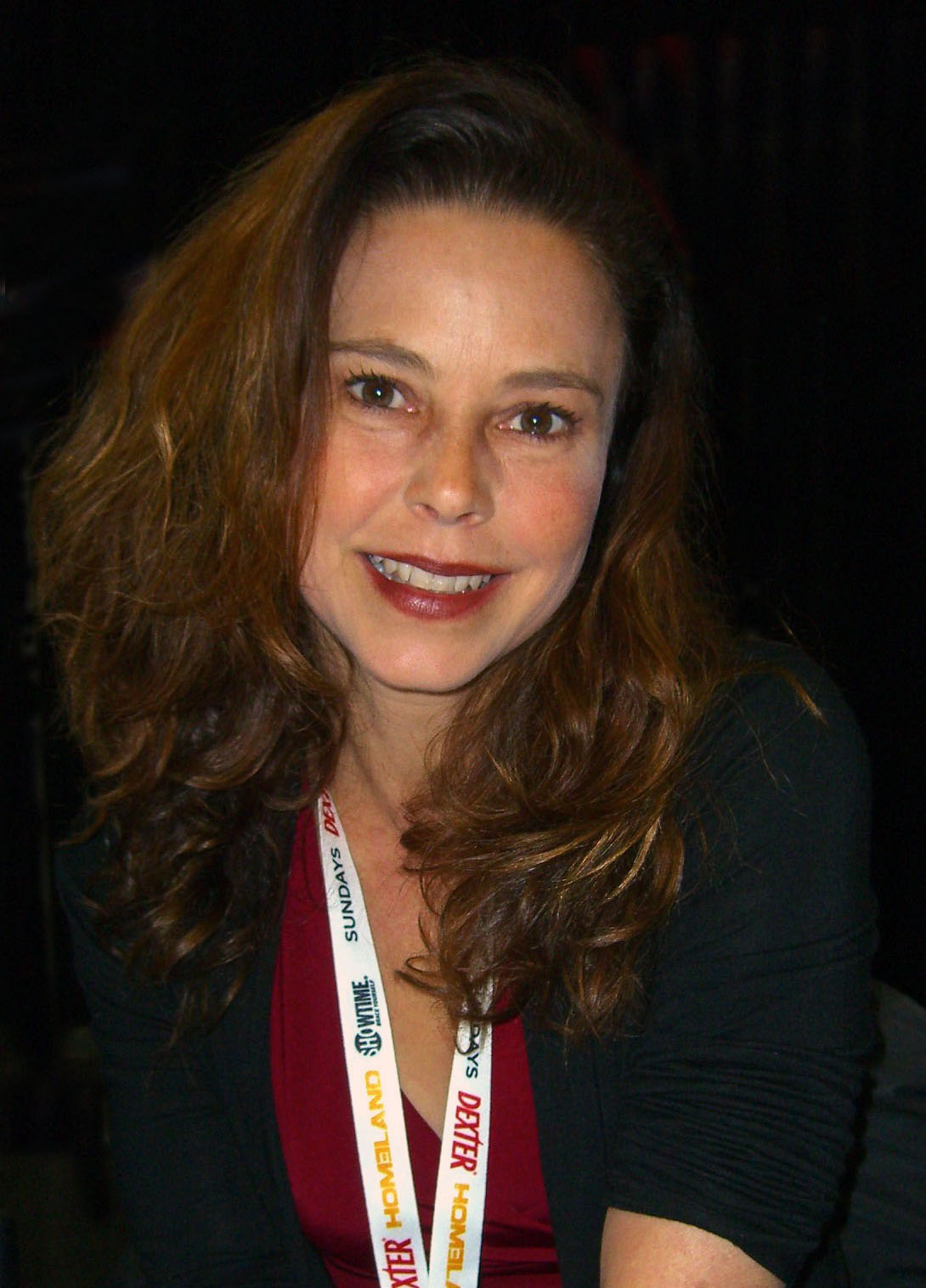
- Barron at the 2012 New York Comic Con
- Born: April 22, 1966 (age 60); New York City, New York, U.S.
- Occupation: Actress
- Years active: 1976–present
- Children: 1

Dana Barron (born April 22, 1966) is an American actress who is best known for her role as the original Audrey Griswold in the 1983 film National Lampoon's Vacation, which she reprised in 2003's National Lampoon's Christmas Vacation 2: Cousin Eddie's Island Adventure for NBC television.

== Early life ==
Barron's father, Robert Weeks Barron, was a director of commercials and a Congregationalist church pastor; Robert founded The Weist-Barron School of Television, the first commercial and soap opera acting for television school in the world. Barron is a fifth generation entertainer. Her great-grandparents were musicians, and her grandmother was a singer. Her grandfather was an opera singer, and her mother moved from Alabama to become an actress. Barron has a sister.

Barron graduated from New York University with a degree in marketing.

== Career ==
Barron's sister, Allison, had been doing TV commercials at a young age, and Barron told her father that she wished to do the same. She began acting at age 10, doing TV commercials as well. By age 11, she was appearing with Christine Baranski in Hide and Seek on Broadway. By age 13, her first film was the horror film He Knows You're Alone, with Tom Hanks, which was also Hanks' first film.

In 1983, Barron starred in the Chevy Chase comedy National Lampoon's Vacation, originating the role of Audrey Griswold. The film became a classic, and Barron would reprise the role 20 years later in the NBC TV movie spinoff, National Lampoon's Christmas Vacation 2: Cousin Eddie's Island Adventure.

Barron received a Daytime Emmy Award in 1989 for her appearance in the CBS after-school special No Means No. Barron appeared on the soap opera One Life to Live from 1984 to 1985 as Michelle Boudin. She starred in the 1998 The Magnificent Seven as Casey.

She had a recurring role as Nikki Witt on the Fox series Beverly Hills, 90210, during which she was able to make her character's clothes and modify her lines.

In 1992, she starred with JoBeth Williams and Chris Burke in the NBC movie Jonathan: The Boy Nobody Wanted. Barron has made guest appearances on TV shows including The Equalizer; In the Heat of the Night; Murder, She Wrote; and Babylon 5 as a telepath named Lauren Ashley in the Season 5 episode "The Corps Is Mother, the Corps Is Father".

== Personal life ==
Barron was in a long term relationship with filmmaker Michael Vickerman. They have a son.

== Filmography ==
=== Film ===
Year	Title	Role	Notes
1980	He Knows You're Alone	Diane Jensen	
1983	National Lampoon's Vacation	Audrey Griswold	
1985	Heaven Help Us	Janine	
1987	Death Wish 4: The Crackdown	Erica Sheldon	
1988	Heartbreak Hotel	Beth Devereux	
1994	Magic Kid 2	Maggie Patterson	
1994	In the Living Years	Kathy	
1997	City of Industry	Gena	
1998	The Face of Alexandre Dumas: The Man in the Iron Mask	Louise de la Vallière	
2000	Dumped	Laura	Video
2000	Stageghost	Renee Bloomer	
2001	The Perfect Nanny	Fawn Lewis	
2001	Night Class	Heather	
2006	National Lampoon's Pucked	Tiny	
2009	A Letter to Dad	Kathy Brown	
2010	Happythankyoumoreplease	The Gynecologist	
2010	The Invited	Kristy	
2012	Mayfly	Deb	Short

=== Television ===
Year	Title	Role	Notes
1983	The Brass Ring	Darlene	TV film
1984	One Life to Live	Michelle Boudin	2 episodes
1985	The Equalizer	Melinda	"The Children's Song"
1987–1989	Crossbow	Eleanor	Regular role
1988	CBS Schoolbreak Special	Megan Wells	"No Means No"
1989	In the Heat of the Night	Corrie Kroller	"Crackdown"
1992	Jonathan: The Boy Nobody Wanted	Laurie Moore	TV film
1992	Beverly Hills, 90210	Nikki Witt	Recurring role (season 3)
1994	Dream On	Reo Saunders	"Blame It on Reo"
1994	Jailbreakers	Sue	TV film
1995	The Watcher	Mary	"The Human Condition"
1995	Murder, She Wrote	Sarah Tyler	"School for Murder"
1998	Babylon 5	Lauren Ashley	"The Corps Is Mother, the Corps Is Father"
1998–2000	The Magnificent Seven	Casey Wells	Recurring role
2000	Python	Kristin	TV film
2003	National Lampoon's Christmas Vacation 2: Cousin Eddie's Island Adventure	Audrey Griswold	TV film
2005	McBride: Murder Past Midnight	Marta Arnack	TV film
2007	Pandemic	Lindsey Mastrapa	TV miniseries
2012	Naughty or Nice	Brenda Weir	TV film
2012	Leverage	Betty	"The Corkscrew Job"
2013	Snow Bride	Doria	TV film
2019	The Goldbergs	Security Guard #2	"Vacation"
