= List of most watched United States television broadcasts of 1993 =

The following is a list of most watched United States television broadcasts of 1993.

== Most watched by week ==
Broadcast (primetime only)
Week of	Title	Network	Viewers (in millions)	Ref.
January 4	Roseanne	ABC	38.3	
January 11	NFC Championship	CBS	60.4	
January 18	60 Minutes	CBS	32.9	
January 25	Super Bowl XXVII	NBC	91.0	
February 1	Home Improvement	ABC	34.4	
February 8	Michael Jackson Talks... to Oprah	ABC	62.3	
February 15	Alex Haley's Queen, Part 2	CBS	35.2	
February 22	Roseanne	ABC	33.3	
March 1	Roseanne	ABC	31.2	
March 8	Home Improvement	ABC	36.3	
March 15	Home Improvement	ABC	37.1	
March 22	Home Improvement	ABC	33.3	
March 29	65th Academy Awards	ABC	45.7	
April 5	NCAA Championship	CBS	32.9	
April 12	Home Improvement	ABC	35.2	
April 19	CBS Sunday Movie	CBS	28.4	
April 26	NBC Sunday Night Movie	NBC	35.4	
May 3	Home Improvement	ABC	34.1	
May 10	Home Improvement	ABC	33.0	
May 17	Cheers	NBC	80.4	
May 24	Triumph Over Disaster: The Hurricane Andrew Story	NBC	23.0	
May 31	Home Improvement	ABC	26.3	
June 7	NBA Finals (Game 3)	NBC	26.1	
June 14	NBA Finals (Game 6) post-game show	NBC	32.8	
June 21	Home Improvement	ABC	24.0	
June 28	Home Improvement	ABC	24.3	
July 5	Home Improvement	ABC	23.8	
July 12	Home Improvement	ABC	26.6	
July 19	Home Improvement	ABC	24.8	
July 26	The ABC Sunday Night Movie	ABC	21.3	
August 2	Home Improvement	ABC	22.9	
August 9	Home Improvement	ABC	23.7	
August 16	Home Improvement	ABC	22.0	
August 23	Home Improvement	ABC	24.4	
August 30	Home Improvement	ABC	24.2	
September 6	Monday Night Football	ABC	31.0	
September 13	Home Improvement	ABC	36.5	
1993–94 television season begins
September 20	Seinfeld	NBC	29.5	
September 27	Home Improvement	ABC	30.1	
October 4	Home Improvement	ABC	34.6	
October 11	Home Improvement	ABC	32.0	
October 18	Home Improvement	ABC	32.0	
October 25	Home Improvement	ABC	40.7	
November 1	Home Improvement	ABC	35.8	
November 8	60 Minutes	CBS	35.9	
November 15	Home Improvement	ABC	36.4	
November 22	Home Alone	NBC	38.4	
November 29	Home Improvement	ABC	40.0	
December 6	Home Improvement	ABC	33.2	
December 13	Home Improvement	ABC	35.2	
December 20	Home Improvement	ABC	34.1	
December 27	Home Improvement	ABC	37.0	
