= Portland (shipwreck) =

Ship wrecked in 1898 near Gloucester, Massachusetts

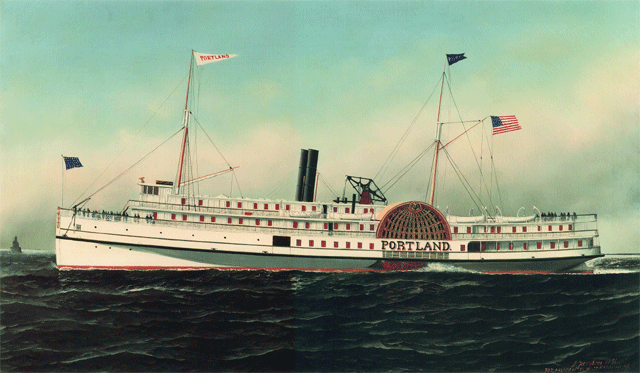
- PS Portland at sea, by Antonio Jacobsen.

History
- Name: PS Portland
- Namesake: Portland, Maine
- Owner: Portland Steam Packet Co.; (later the Portland Steamship Co.)
- Route: Atlantic Ocean between Portland, Maine and Boston, Massachusetts
- Builder: New England Shipbuilding Co., Bath, Maine
- Cost: $250,000
- Launched: October 14, 1889
- Home port: Portland, Maine
- Fate: Sank on 27 November 1898, during the Portland Gale

General characteristics
- Type: Passenger paddle steamship
- Tonnage: 2,284 gross tonnage (GT); 1,517 net tonnage (NT)
- Length: 281 ft (86 m) keel length; 291 ft (89 m) length overall
- Beam: 42 ft (13 m) hull; 68 ft (21 m) across wheel guards
- Draft: 10 ft (3.0 m)
- Depth of hold: 15 ft 6 in (4.72 m)
- Decks: Three
- Installed power: (1) 62-inch-bore (1.6 m), 12-foot-stroke (3.7 m), 1,200-horsepower vertical-beam steam engine with (2) boilers
- Propulsion: (2) 35-foot-diameter (11 m) paddlewheels; each having (26) paddle buckets, 8 ft × 2 ft (2.4 m × 0.6 m), dipping 4 ft (1.2 m).
- Speed: 12 knots (22 km/h; 14 mph)
- Capacity: 156 staterooms accommodating 700 passengers; 400 tons freight
- Crew: 63
- Portland (Shipwreck and Remains)
- U.S. National Register of Historic Places
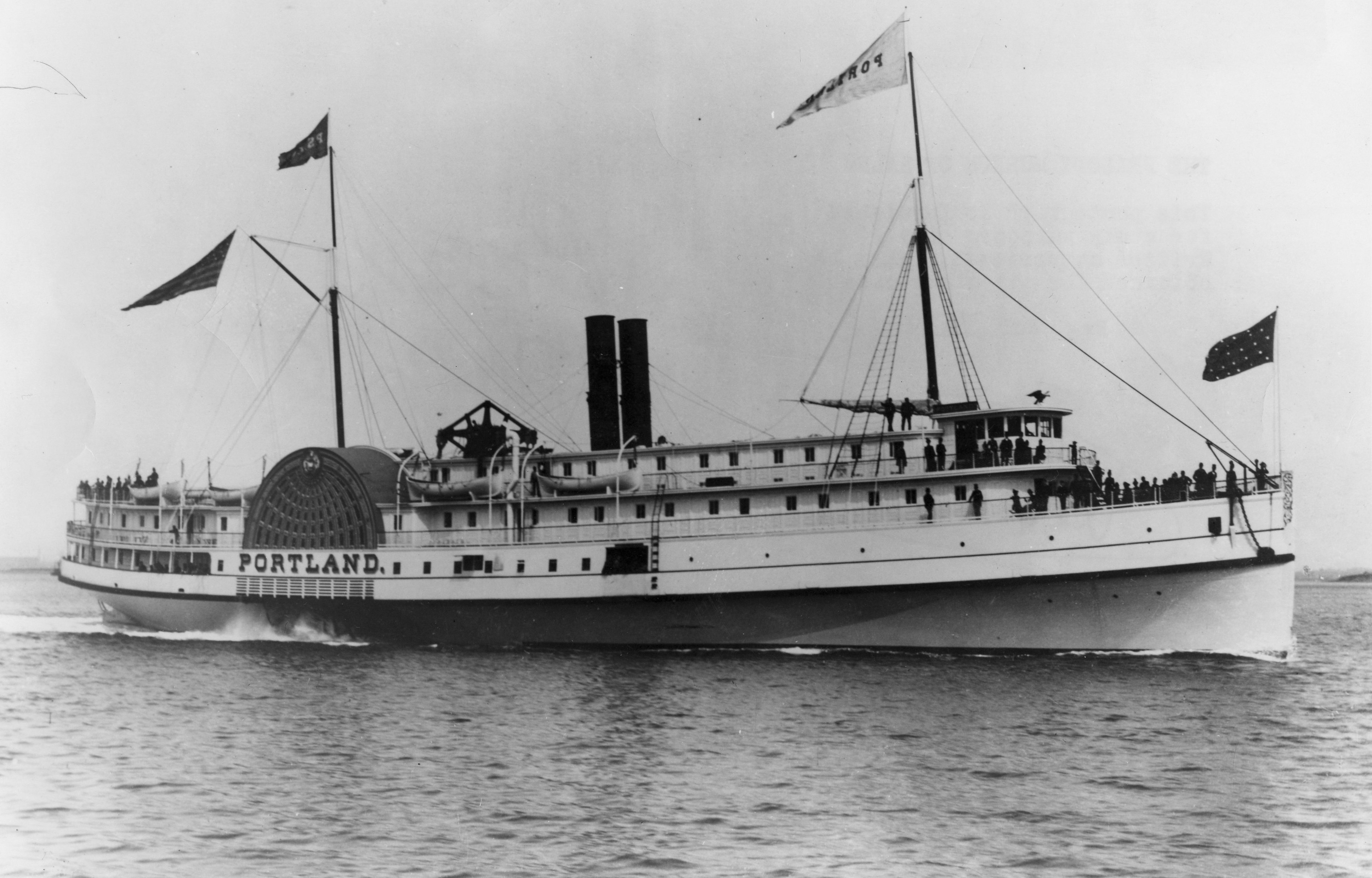
- Nearest city: Gloucester, Massachusetts
- NRHP reference No.: 04001473
- Added to NRHP: January 13, 2005

PS Portland was a large side-wheel paddle steamer, an ocean-going steamship with side-mounted paddlewheels. She was built in 1889 for passenger service between Boston, Massachusetts, and Portland, Maine. She is best known as the namesake of the infamous Portland Gale of 1898, a massive blizzard that struck coastal New England, claiming the lives of over 400 people and more than 150 vessels.

== Construction and design ==
Portland's wooden hull was built by the New England Company in Bath, Maine. The 1200-horsepower vertical-beam steam engine was constructed by the Portland Company, with a bore, or cylinder diameter, measuring 5 ft 2 in (1.57 m) across, together with a 12 ft (3.7 m) stroke. The ship's two iron boilers were constructed at the Bath Iron Works, also in Bath, Maine.

Portland was built for the Portland Steam Packet Company (later renamed Portland Steamship Company), at a cost of $250,000 ($8.96 million in 2025), to provide overnight passenger service between Boston and Portland. She was one of New England's largest and most luxurious paddle steamers in existence at the time, and after nine years' solid performance, she had earned a reputation as a safe and dependable vessel.

== Final voyage and sinking ==
On November 27, 1898, Portland, having departed Boston earlier, was en route to Portland, Maine, following her traditional route. Unbeknownst to the crew, a powerful storm system was quickly traveling north, and Portland, despite her reputation as a remarkably safe vessel, was ill-equipped to handle such extreme conditions.

At some point during the storm, Portland sank off of Cape Cod with all hands, the exact number of which cannot be determined, as the only known passenger list went down with the ship. Initial newspaper accounts at the time estimated the loss as from 99 to 118 persons. The bodies of only 16 crew and 35 passengers were ever recovered, but present-day estimates are that the Portland was carrying, in total, from 193 to 245 persons, including 63 crew.

Her loss represented New England's greatest steamship disaster prior to the year 1900. The sinking of Portland hastened the collapse of the Abyssinian Meeting House congregation, with nineteen of the church's adult male members having been on board.

== Shipwreck ==
The shipwreck is lying 460 feet (140 m) below the surface of the Atlantic Ocean near Gloucester, Massachusetts, at an undisclosed location within the federally-protected Stellwagen Bank National Marine Sanctuary. The site was first located in 1989 by John Fish and Arnold Carr of American Underwater Search and Survey. The find was confirmed in 2002 by a National Oceanic and Atmospheric Administration expedition that used remotely operated vehicles (ROVs) to photograph the wreck. The wreck was added to the National Register of Historic Places in 2005.

=== Divers explore Portland wreckage ===
In 2008, five Massachusetts scuba divers became the first to reach the steamship, also known as the "Titanic of New England". The divers made three successful dives, and reported that the wreck was strewn with artifacts, like stacks of dishes, mugs, wash basins and toilets, but no human remains. They did not, however, explore below the deck because of the danger. Because of the depth of the wreck site, they reported that some of their dive lights imploded, and they could only explore the site for 10–15 minutes before needing to return to the surface. The divers "were unable to retrieve artifacts" due to rules in place at the Stellwagen Bank National Marine Sanctuary.

Portland illustrations
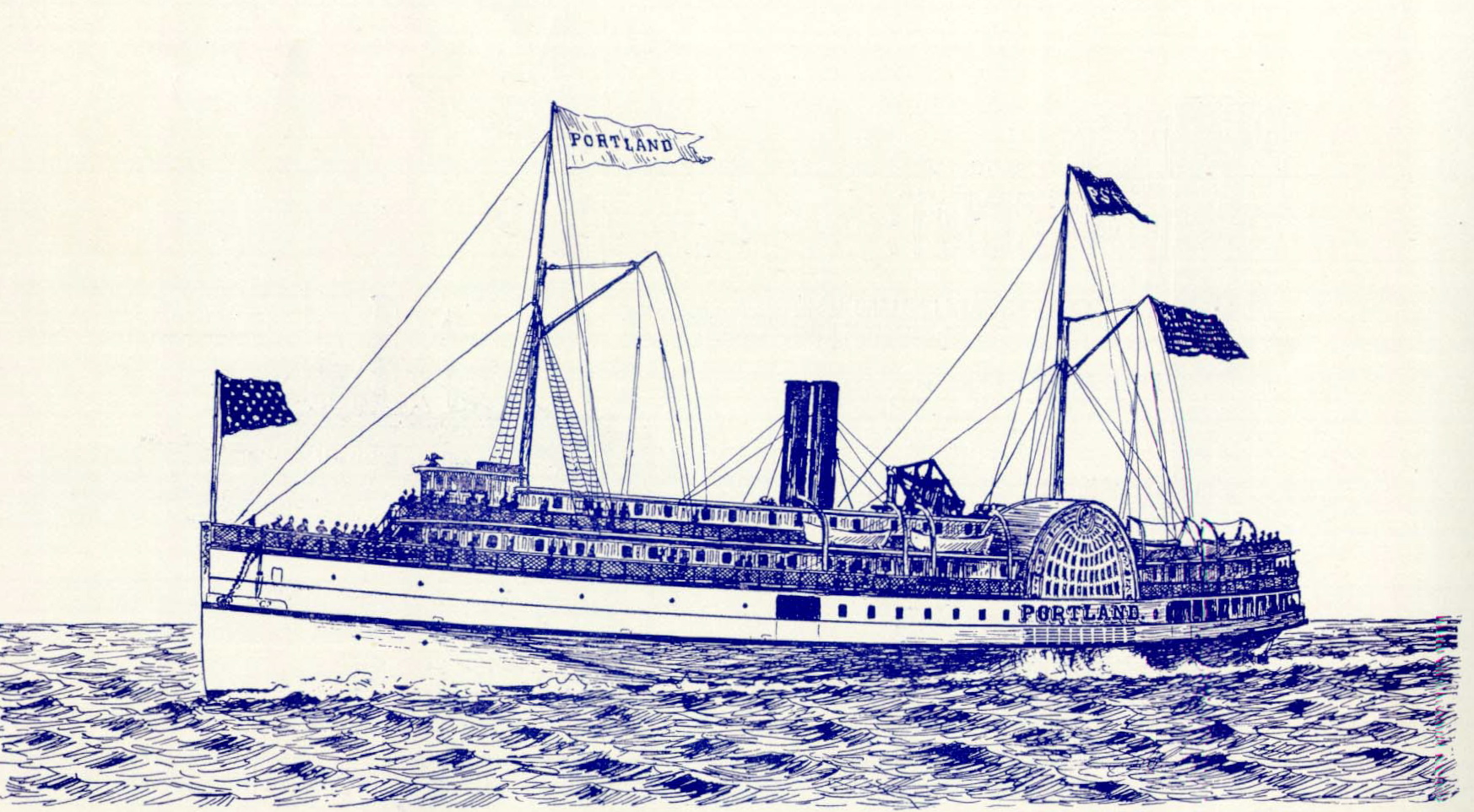
Portland, drawn in 1895 by Samuel Ward Stanton, who died on Titanic

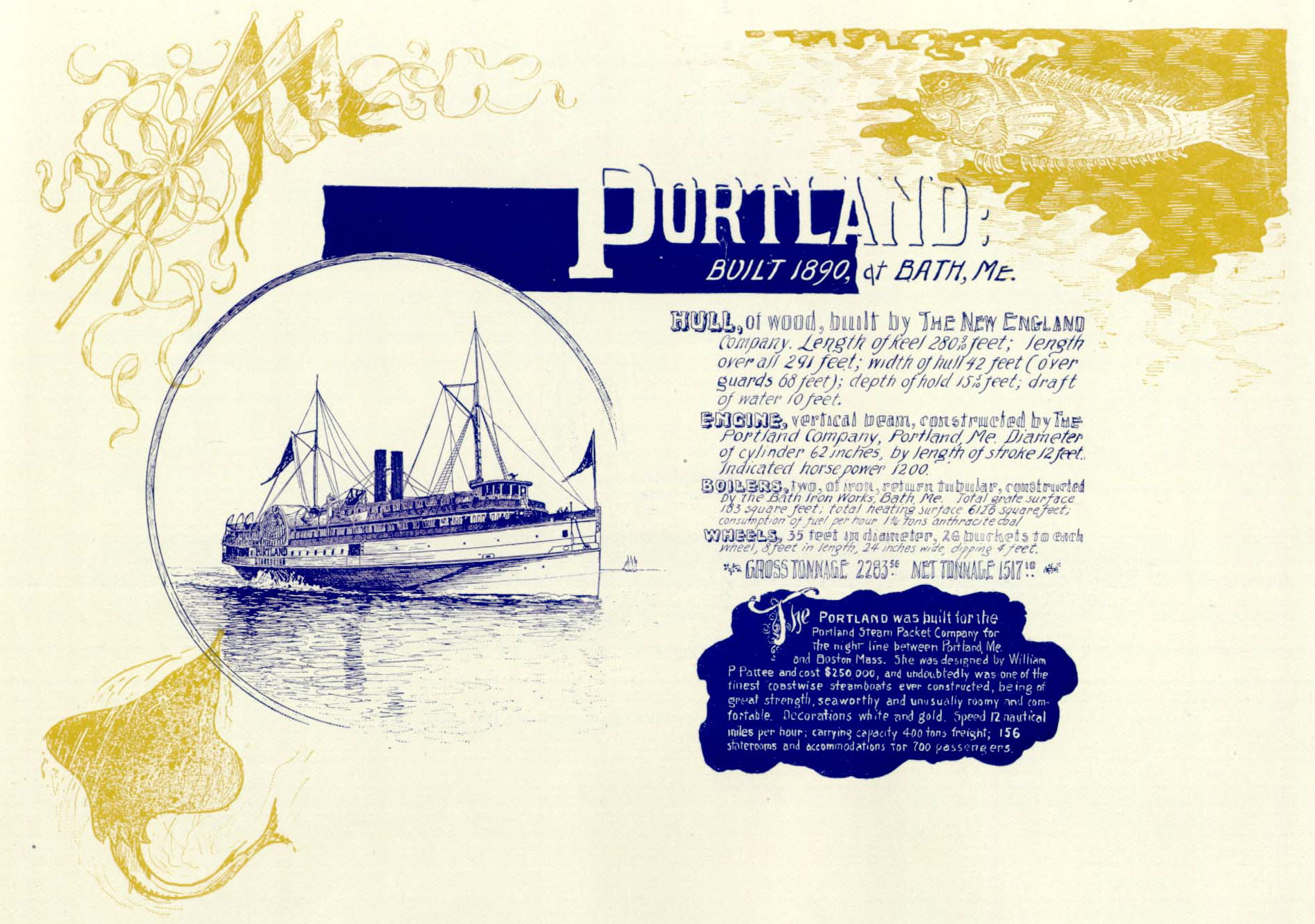
Another drawing of Portland by Samuel Ward Stanton

== See also ==
- List of disasters in Massachusetts by death toll
- National Register of Historic Places listings in Gloucester, Massachusetts
- National Register of Historic Places listings in Essex County, Massachusetts
