= Chris Demetral =

American former actor (born 1976)

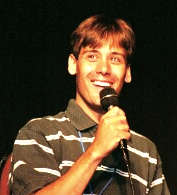
- Demetral in 2004
- Born: Christopher Peter Demetral; November 14, 1976 (age 49); Royal Oak, Michigan, U.S.
- Occupation: Actor
- Years active: 1988–2002

Chris Demetral (born November 14, 1976) is an American former actor best known for playing the character Jeremy Tupper, the son of newly divorced New York book editor Martin Tupper (played by Brian Benben) on the HBO series Dream On and also Jack in Lois & Clark: The New Adventures of Superman. He played the title character in the short-lived series The Secret Adventures of Jules Verne on the Sci Fi Channel. He also played Christopher Ewing in Dallas: J.R. Returns.

== Early life ==
Demetral's parents were divorced when he was 3, and he lived with his father. They moved from Michigan to California in 1984, and he then started auditioning for parts. When Demetral was 10 years old, he answered an open call for The Return of the Living Dead. Demetral recalls that he was too young for the part; but he thought he would "be a good baby zombie or something", instead, he got sent to an agent and got signed that day.

== Filmography ==
Year	Film	Role	Notes
1989	Mr. Belvedere	Boy	Episode: "New Year's"
1989	ABC Afterschool Special	Allen	Episode: "Private Affairs"
1989	Major Dad	Mike Rossovich	Episode: "Robin's Awakening"
1989	Empty Nest	Billy	Episode: "The R.N. Who Came to Dinner"
1989	The Wonder Years	McCormick	Episode: "Math Class Squared"
1990	The Magical World of Disney	Dave	Episode: "Disneyland's 35th Anniversary Celebration"
1990	McGee and Me!	Todd Burton	Episode: "Back to the Drawing Board"
1990	The New Lassie	Jonathan Latimer	Episodes: "Trapped" and "Fallen Idol"
1990	Star Trek: The Next Generation	Jean-Luc Riker/Ethan	Episode:"Future Imperfect"
1990–1996	Dream On	Jeremy Tupper	119 episodes
1991	Blossom	Fred Fogerty	Episode: "The Geek"
1991	Davis Rules	Billy Bonafield	Episode: "Habla Espanol?"
1991	Sometimes They Come Back	Wayne Norman	Television film
1991	Parker Lewis Can't Lose	Pauley	Episode: "Father Knows Less"
1991	Going Under	Apple	Feature film
1991	Dolly Dearest	Jimmy Wade	Feature film
1991	Blossom	Dennis	Episode: "Honor?"
1992	Jonathan: The Boy Nobody Wanted	Brad Moore	Television film
1992	Step by Step	Steve	Episode: "The Making of the President"
1993	Shaky Ground	Stoner	3 episodes
1993	Triumph Over Disaster: The Hurricane Andrew Story	Robin Hulin	Television film
1994	Blank Check	Damian Waters	Feature film
1994	Lois & Clark: The New Adventures of Superman	Jack	4 episodes
1996	Flipper	Lyle Costas	Episode: "Menace to Seaciety"
1996	Dallas: J.R. Returns	Christopher Ewing	Television film
1996	For Hope	Alan Altman	Television film
1997	Journey of the Heart	Tony Johnston	Television film
1998	Beverly Hills, 90210	Chris Meyers	Episode: "All That Glitters"
1999	Dawson's Creek	Mark	Episode: "Homecoming"
2000	The Wild Thornberrys	Mato	Voice, episode: "Pack of Thornberrys"
2000	Chicken Soup for the Soul	Frank	Episode: "Summer School"
2000	Batman Beyond	Corey Cavalieri	Voice, episode: "Sentries of the Last Cosmos"
2000	CSI: Crime Scene Investigation	James Johnson	Episode: "Pledging Mr. Johnson"
2000	The Secret Adventures of Jules Verne	Jules Verne	22 episodes
2002	The Zeta Project	Bret	Voice, episode: "Quality Time"

== Awards and nominations ==
Year	Award	Result	Category	Film or series
1993	Young Artist Award	Nominated	Best Young Actor in a Television Movie	Jonathan: The Boy Nobody Wanted
1993	Young Artist Award	Nominated	Best Young Actor in a Cable Movie	Sometimes They Come Back
1993	Young Artist Award	Nominated	Best Young Actor Guest Starring in a Television Series	Blossom
1993	Young Artist Award	Won	Best Young Actor Starring in a Cable Series	Dream On
1995	Young Artist Award	Nominated	Best Performance by a Youth Actor - TV Guest Star	Lois & Clark: The New Adventures of Superman
