= Hanover Center Historic District =

Historic district in Massachusetts, United States

- U.S. National Register of Historic Places
- U.S. Historic district
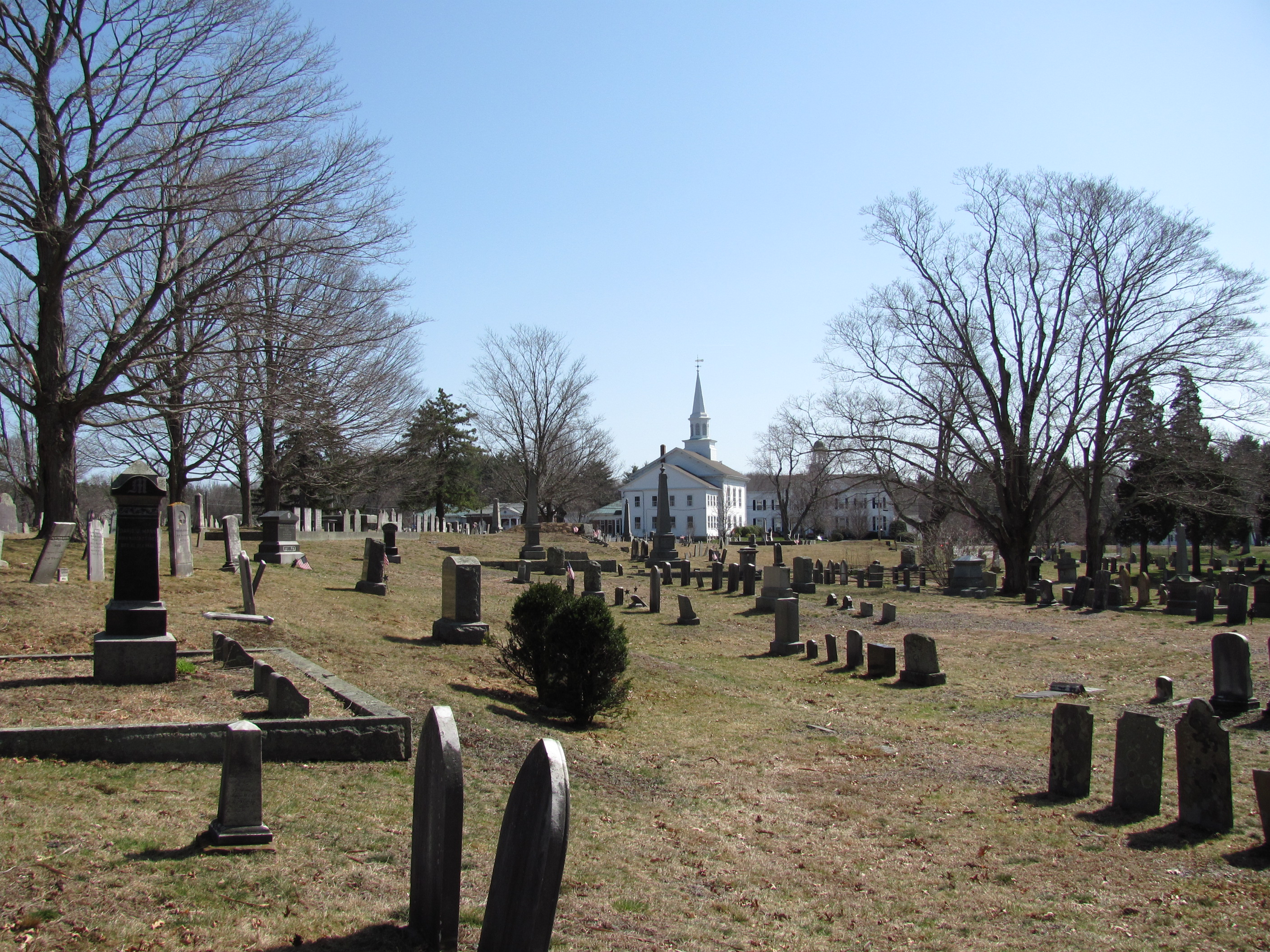
- Hanover Center Cemetery

- Location within Massachusetts Location within the United States
- Location: Hanover, Massachusetts
- Coordinates: 42°7′6″N 70°50′40″W
- Area: 42 acres (17 ha)
- Built: 1727
- Architect: Beal, J. Williams; Beal, John Woodbridge, et al.
- Architectural style: Greek Revival, Georgian, Colonial
- NRHP reference No.: 96000476
- Added to NRHP: May 9, 1996

The Hanover Center Historic District encompasses the historic town center of Hanover, Massachusetts. Established in 1721, the town center includes the town hall, library, and church, as well as its first cemetery and the c. 1700 Stetson House, one of its oldest buildings. The district was listed on the National Register of Historic Places in 1996.

== Description and history ==
The area that is now Hanover was settled around 1700, originally as part of Scituate. Much of its land had been awarded to Cornet Robert Stetson in 1634, and it was his son Benjamin who probably built the house c. 1700 standing on the south side of the town center. Enlarged about 1716, it was here that early meetings were held that led to the town's incorporation in 1727. In that year, the town cemetery was laid out, and its first meeting house was built, where the present First Congregational Church (built 1863) stands. Over the 19th and early 20th centuries, the center acquired the trappings of a modest New England town center, including its town hall and library.

The historic district includes seven properties located around the junction of Hanover Street (Massachusetts Route 139) with Main and Silver Streets, near the geographic center of the town. On the south side of Hanover Street stand (from east to west), the Stetson House, now a museum of the local historical society, the Curtis Free Library (1907, Federal Revival), and the Italianate town hall (1863). The First Congregational Church occupies a prominent location on what is now an island surrounded by the three roadways, and the cemetery is located to its north. East of the church is the Colonial Revival Sylvester School, built in 1927 as the town's first public high school. West of the church stands its parsonage house, built about 1855.

== See also ==
- National Register of Historic Places listings in Plymouth County, Massachusetts
