= Samuel Whitcomb Jr. =

- Born: September 14, 1792
- Died: March 5, 1879 (aged 86)
- Spouse: Mary Simmons Joy (m. 1817)

Samuel Whitcomb Jr. (September 14, 1792 – March 5, 1879) was a colporteur, journalist and a champion of the working class, public schools and democratic political values. Whitcomb was born in Hanover, Massachusetts. As an adult, he moved across the early United States more commonly than most people of his time. He served in the War of 1812. In 1817, he married Mary Simmons Joy.

He held several jobs and careers that included book peddling, landowner, clerk, and journalist. It was his business of selling book subscriptions that allowed him to travel the country extensively, giving him opportunities to purchase land at bargain prices, gather a unique knowledge of the common US people, and to meet interesting and prominent people, including President Thomas Jefferson.

== Visit to Monticello ==
Two of those he met in 1824 were Thomas Jefferson and James Madison, while trying to sell subscriptions of William Mitford's multivolume book on The History of Greece. Though he did not sell any to Jefferson, he was able to interview him. This conversation has been memorialized in Monticello. It gives a critical, yet kind view of the octogenarian President, from the perspective of a common northerner—as opposed to the majority of scenes recorded from the perspective of Jefferson's peers or other slave-owners and political figures. Whitcomb's wife accompanied him on these business travels.

== Activist and reformer ==
During his lifetime, Whitcomb was better known for his journalism and his untiring work for public schools and the rights of the common individual. He read the books he sold; information and data from them are used throughout his writings and speeches. Early on, he joined the Massachusetts temperance movement. In the 1830s, he became a member of the Dorchester Workingmen's Party. According to him, one of the party's aims was "to promote the distribution among the producers of wealth, of a more equitable proportion of the comforts and enjoyments resulting from their individual joint labours."

Whitcomb was notable as a representative of the Northern, antebellum White; he was a self-educated working-class man who was politically active in several reform movements and had a deep sense of historical identity. His writing places him as belonging to the anti-slavery camp, but he was not an abolitionist. Whitcomb did not believe in equality of races. He criticized William Lloyd Garrison after Nat Turner's rebellion for supporting abolition. His speeches and writings advocating democracy rooted in working-class values made him an influential figure in other ways.

In September 1833, the Monthly Traveler of Boston wrote the following about Whitcomb after one of his speeches: "Mr. Whitcomb, it will be recollected, has not reaped the advantages of an academic education; he has made himself what he now is,-- which, to our view, goes more to his credit, than though his name were put forth with all the honors of a college diploma." His enthusiasm for the opportunities available to common citizens in the new republic inspired him to write, advocate and speak for the common person.

In 1847, while living in Washington, D.C., and working as a revenue clerk for the Office of the Treasury, Whitcomb became a correspondent for the Boston Journal. He researched and wrote mainly about topics concerning populist politics and the public school system. From 1845 to 1849, he worked for the Teachers Placement Agency. His activist and journalist work garnered him friendships with influential people such as Edward Everett and Horace Mann.

== Later Days ==
In 1879, Whitcomb died in Vermont, on an estate he bought years before, but not before leading the defense for the Vermont veterans of the 1812 War, and actively promoting industrialization, fair wages and the expansion of the U.S. into Native American territories.

== Best Known Works ==
- An Address: "on the Claims of Those Living by Manual Labour" given before the Workingmen's Society. 1831
- Two lectures on the advantages of a republican condition of society, for the promotion of the arts, and the cultivation of science. 1833.
- Interview of Thomas Jefferson, 1824.
