= Jonathan: The Boy Nobody Wanted =

- Video cover
- Genre: Biography; Drama
- Written by: Doris Silverton; Peter Nelson; Steve Lawson; Dalene Young
- Directed by: George Kaczender
- Starring: JoBeth Williams; Chris Burke
- Music by: Misha Segal
- Country of origin: United States
- Original language: English

Production
- Executive producer: Marcy Gross
- Producers: Doris Silverton; Peter Nelson
- Cinematography: Eric Van Haren Noman
- Editor: Stephen Michael
- Running time: 95 minutes
- Production companies: Gross-Weston Productions; Stephen J. Cannell Productions

Original release
- Network: NBC
- Release: October 16, 1992

Jonathan: The Boy Nobody Wanted is a 1992 American made-for-television biographical drama film starring JoBeth Williams and Chris Burke. The film is directed by George Kaczender and inspired by a true story concerning a landmark legal decision for rights of the disabled.

== Plot ==
Jonathan (Chris Burke), a youth with Down Syndrome, is institutionalized by his parents (Alley Mills and Tom Mason), who do not wish to be burdened with caring for him. Volunteer Ginny Moore (JoBeth Williams) spends time with Jonathan at the institution and eventually her own home, where he forges a bond with her and her family (Dana Barron, Chris Demetral, Jeffrey DeMunn). Jonathan's faculties improve with Ginny's care, but his heart problems become increasingly severe. His parents refuse to give consent for the medical procedure that would cure him, so Ginny sues to obtain guardianship of Jonathan so she can give permission for the treatment.

== Cast ==
- JoBeth Williams as Ginny Moore
- Chris Burke as Jonathan Willis
  - K.C. Clarizio as Jonathan Willis (age 6)
  - Brandon Bauer as Jonathan Willis (ages 11–13)
- Dana Barron as Laurie Moore
- Chris Demetral as Brad Moore
- Madge Sinclair as Faye Lincoln
- Jeffrey DeMunn as Frank Moore
- Tom Mason as Max Willis
- Robert Cicchini as Neil Vogler
- Mason Adams as Judge Colbert
- Paul Linke as Dr. Sullivan
- H. Richard Greene as Wolff
- Alley Mills as Carol Willis
- Lorraine Morin-Torre as Ada
- Linden Chiles as Judge Martin
- Damon Sharpe as Todd
- Kim Delgado as Bailiff
- Suzanne Reynolds as Reporter
- Lauree Berger as Pat Greenway
- Alicia Bergman as Sue Ann
- Kaley Ward-Hummel as Newspaper Reporter
- Judy Milstein as Impatient Orderly
- Paul L. Nolan as D.A.
- Dana Chelette as Orderly
- Mike Principato as Jonathan Willis' brother
