= Franciscan Sisters of Baltimore =

Members of a Catholic religious institute

Franciscan Sisters of Baltimore were the American members of a Roman Catholic religious congregation of women founded in the London suburb of Mill Hill, England, in 1868. Connected to the Society of Mill Hill Missionaries from the time of their founding, they were committed to serving the needy of the world. Members of the congregation came to the United States in 1881, where they were the first white religious order dedicated to serve the African-American population of Baltimore. The United States Province merged with the Sisters of St. Francis of Assisi in 2001 and continue their ministry in Baltimore.

== History ==
=== Mill Hill ===
In 1866, the future English cardinal, Herbert Vaughan felt that the newly emancipated Catholic Church of Great Britain needed to establish its presence in the new nations of the British Empire, so as not to concede their populations to the missionary work of the Protestant Churches. To this end, he founded the Missionary Society of St. Joseph, better known as the Mill Hill Missionaries, to be a society of Catholic priests dedicated to the foreign missions. Vaughan established St. Joseph's Missionary College at Holcombe House in Mill Hill.

In 1868 Vaughan received a group of Anglican Franciscan Sisters living in Hammersmith into the Roman Catholic Church. Under the leadership of Mother Mary Francis of the Five Wounds (Mary Eliza Basil), they were thereby founded as the Franciscan Sisters of the Five Wounds. When the missionary college moved to larger quarters in 1871, Vaughan offered the use of the house to the Sisters, which they accepted. Unknown to them, Vaughan's goal had been to find religious sisters to staff the domestic department of the college. This the Sisters refused to do. Later they joined in the work of the Society in the United States and Uganda.

The following year Vaughan received an appeal from the American Catholic bishops, resulting from their deliberations at the Tenth Provincial Council of Baltimore held in 1869. The fifth decree of the Council called upon the bishops of the nation to provide missions and schools for all black Americans in their dioceses, as education was seen as a critical need by that population. Vaughan had been petitioning the Holy See for assignment to some region where his missionaries could serve, and mentioned this request in his communications. In 1871, Pope Pius IX granted both requests, assigning the society to serve the African-American residents of the Archdiocese of Baltimore as Apostolic Missionaries, subject directly to Rome.

=== Baltimore ===
In 1881, five Franciscan Sisters of the Five Wounds came to the United States at the invitation of Cardinal James Gibbons, the Archbishop of Baltimore, to care for the many homeless African American children. Mrs. Mary Herbert, an African American, had taken in many of these children, but as their numbers increased it became overwhelming. Working with Mrs. Herbert, an orphanage was opened at the intersections of Maryland Avenue and 23rd Street which the Sisters operated until 1950. As American girls began to enter the congregation, the Sisters became engaged in teaching. They taught in several schools of the city, and also in Catholic schools in the Archdiocese of New York and the Diocese of Richmond.

After the closing of the orphanage, the Sisters opened there the St. Francis School for Special Education in 1953, in order to meet the needs of that group of children. As a result of requests by the community for help with these children as they passed school age, in 1961 they opened the St. Elizabeth School for Special Education, which was dedicated with a 160 student enrollment capacity.

During the mid-1960s, as the Franciscan Sisters saw the growing tensions of the American inner city populations and the riots in their own neighborhoods, they looked for other ways to meet the needs of those around them. In answer to a need expressed by the local community, in 1968 they opened the Franciscan Center of Baltimore to provide emergency food and clothing. It was opened under the supervision of Irene Marshiano and continues to operate.

In 1993 the Franciscan Sisters celebrated the 125th anniversary of the founding of the congregation. Their celebration was marred, however, by the recent murder of the superior of the convent which housed their retired members, MaryAnn Glinka, in a crime which shocked the people of the city.

=== Dissolution ===
By the end of the 20th century, the Sisters were faced with both an aging membership and few new applicants. They made the decision to merge with the Sisters of St. Francis of Assisi based in St. Francis, Wisconsin. The merger took place on October 4, 2001, the feast day of St. Francis of Assisi.
