= Chris Burke (actor) =

American Down syndrome advocate

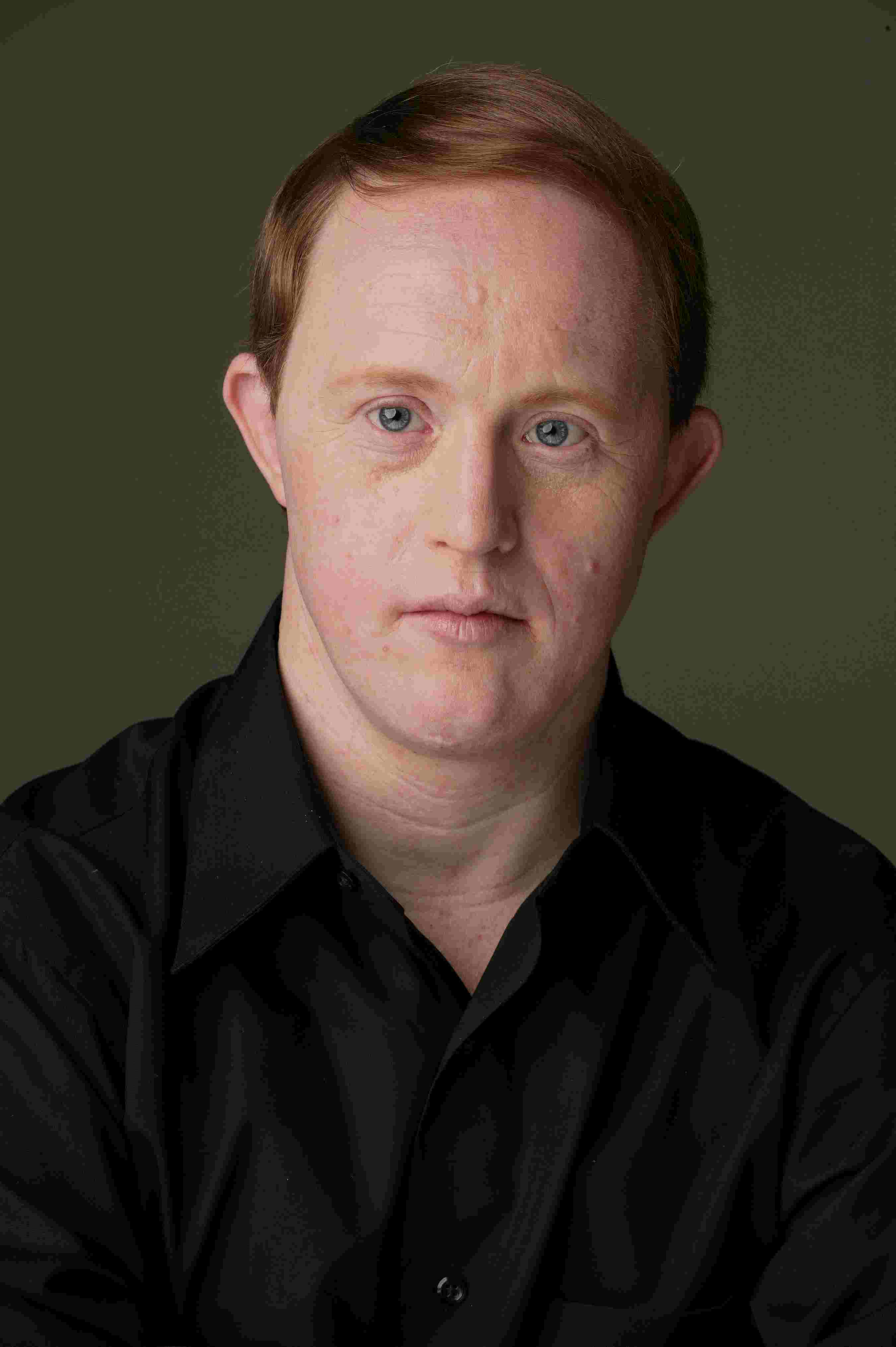
- Burke in 2007
- Born: Christopher Joseph Burke; August 26, 1965 (age 61); New York City, U.S.
- Occupations: Actor, singer
- Years active: 1987–present

Christopher Joseph Burke (born August 26, 1965) is an American actor known for his character Charles "Corky" Thatcher on the television series Life Goes On.

== Early life ==
Burke is the youngest of four children of Marian Burke, a retired trade-show manager, and Frank Burke, a retired NYPD Detective (DOI). Burke was born with Down syndrome and his parents were told to institutionalize him. Instead, they raised him at home with the help of his siblings. From a young age, Burke enjoyed watching TV and movies and wanted to be on television. He was encouraged by his family to follow his career objectives.

Burke attended the Kennedy Child Study Center in New York City, from age five until graduating shortly before his eighth birthday. In the fall of 1973, Burke was sent to board at the Cardinal Cushing School and Training Center in Hanover, Massachusetts. In 1978, Burke transferred to the Don Guanella School in Springfield, Pennsylvania, to be closer to his brother, J.R., who lived close by. Burke graduated from Don Guanella in 1986. After graduation, he worked as an elevator operator and did volunteer work for programs for students with disabilities at New York City's Public School 138.

Burke's first acting performance was in a production of The Emperor's New Clothes at the Cardinal Cushing School. His dramatic reading made quite an impression on the audience as well as Hollywood producer Robert Evans, who happened to be in the theatre at the time. This role inspired Burke to participate in a talent show after he transferred to Don Guanella, in which he acted as a zombie in a reenactment of Michael Jackson's "Thriller" video. He continued to hone his talent by attending night classes, going to auditions, writing scripts, and reading books about his favorite actors.

== Career ==
Burke got his first professional acting job in 1987 in the ABC TV movie Desperate. Network executives at ABC were impressed by his performance in Desperate and created Life Goes On with Burke's character, Charles "Corky" Thatcher, as the main role. Corky was the first character in a network television series with Down syndrome. Life Goes On propelled Burke into fame and wide recognition. The series ran from 1989 to 1993.

Burke made guest appearances on other TV shows and movies, including co-starring with JoBeth Williams in the NBC Movie of the Week Jonathan: The Boy Nobody Wanted.

== Down syndrome advocacy ==
Burke has been the Goodwill Ambassador for the National Down Syndrome Society since 1994. He has starred in the organization's acclaimed public service announcements, including Tracey Ullman in 1999 and, more recently, for the "My Great Story" public awareness campaign with actor John C. McGinley and TV hosts Meredith Vieira and Nancy O'Dell. As a Goodwill Ambassador, he travels the country attending Buddy Walks, making public appearances, speaking with the press and greeting fans. When he is not on the road, Burke is a member of the National Down Syndrome Society's staff, working in their New York City office.

From 1994 to 2014 Burke toured the U.S. with his three piece musical group, Chris Burke with Joe and John DeMasi, for which he was the singer. Burke met his bandmates, twin brothers Joe and John DeMasi, when they were music counselors at the town of Hempstead, New York's ANCHOR program for individuals with disabilities, when Burke was a teenager. The group released four albums. Lollipops and Love Songs was released in 1993. In 1994, the group signed a record deal with BMG Kidz and released Singer with the Band. This was followed up by the release of Forever Friends, which won a Parents Choice Gold Seal for Excellence Award, and A World of Kindness in 1998. They also produced a two-episode DVD for children called The Forever Friends Show and have appeared on television performing their signature song, "Celebrate."

In 1991, Burke co-wrote his autobiography, A Special Kind of Hero, with Jo Beth McDaniel. From 1994 to 2005, he was the editor-in-chief of News 'n Views and UpBeat, publications written by and for people with Down syndrome, and in 2009, he contributed to the National Down Syndrome Society's My Great Story campaign by writing his story, "Great Expectations".

== Filmography ==
- Jonathan: The Boy Nobody Wanted, TV movie, 1992
- North and South, Book III: Heaven & Hell, miniseries, 1994
- The Commish TV series, 1994
- Promised Land TV series, 1997
- Touched by an Angel recurring as Taylor, an angel who has Down syndrome, 1997
- The Division, 2002
- ER, 2002

== Awards and honors ==
- Golden Globe Award Nominee, Best Actor in a Supporting Role in a Series, Mini-Series or Motion Picture Made for TV, 1990
- Golden Apple Awards Nominee, 1990
- Ten Outstanding Young Americans, 1991
- National Rehabilitation Hospital Honoree, 1993
