= Franciscan Center of Baltimore =

Emergency outreach agency in the Baltimore, Maryland, US

- Established: 1968; 58 years ago
- Founder: Sister Irene Marshiano, O.S.F.
- Type: Catholic charity
- Legal status: 501(c)(3)
- Headquarters: 101 West 23rd Street; Baltimore, Maryland 21218
- Location: Lower Charles Village
- Coordinates: 39.314809°N 76.618727°W
- Region served: Baltimore metropolitan area
- Products: Baby items, food boxes, and prescription vouchers
- Services: Chidlren's library, dental care, legal aid, and mailing services
- Executive Director: Jeffrey Griffin
- Affiliations: Franciscan Sisters of Baltimore
- Website: www.fcbmore.org

The Franciscan Center of Baltimore, founded by the Franciscan Sisters of Baltimore in 1968, is an emergency outreach agency located in the Baltimore neighborhood of Lower Charles Village, at 101 W. 23rd Street. The goal of the center is to give immediate response and relief to the emergency needs of disenfranchised people and help them resolve the conditions that placed them at risk. Since its founding, the center has offered comfort and guidance to thousands of needy Baltimoreans.

The basis of the Franciscan Sisters' ministry is recognizing the dignity of every human being and serving all people with respect. The center serves people in need regardless of age, race, creed or national origin. Most clients live in Baltimore City but city residency is not a requirement. The Franciscan Center is a 501(c)(3) organization.

== History ==
The Franciscan Sisters have fed the hungry and cared for African American orphans since their arrival in Baltimore in 1881. They were the first white religious order with a mission to serve blacks in Baltimore.

When, in 1968, a $200 donation of stock shares coincided with the availability of a rowhouse that had previously been home to missionary priests, the sisters turned to the community for guidance; neighbors requested emergency food and clothing services.

In its first month of operation, with a budget of $200, the Franciscan Center served 30 people. Sister Irene Marshiano, O.S.F., was the center's first director, aided by Sister Gertrude Brennan, O.S.F., and volunteers.

In the early years, the center was staffed by the Franciscan Sisters, with the assistance of members of the Third Order of Saint Francis and lay volunteers. Beginning with the baby boom generation, the number of young women entering religious orders has not been sufficient to replace retiring sisters. This threatened the long-term viability of the Franciscan Sisters of Baltimore. In 2001, they merged with another congregation, the Sisters of St. Francis of Assisi in Wisconsin.

Today, the Franciscan Center is staffed primarily by lay people, including the current president and CEO, Karen Heyward-West.

== The Franciscan Center today ==
The center's operating budget was $1.1 million in 2008, and 22 paid staff plus more than 350 volunteers served thousands of clients.

Because of the transient circumstances of many of the people who seek the center's help, an exact number of clients is impossible to gauge. In 2008, between 400 and 650 meals were served each day; 2,300 clients received clothing or hygiene products; 370 clients used the Technology Resource center; and 7,100 clients were interviewed and screened to determine eligibility for emergency or support services. Of the clients served, more than 3,700 were homeless.

== Services offered ==
The Franciscan Center serves a hot lunch on weekdays and distributes bags of groceries. Case managers help those who face eviction or are unable to pay for medical supplies, prescriptions, transportation or other basic needs and provide emergency funding. Clients include hundreds of adults living with HIV/AIDS.

The center offers weekly screenings for sexually transmitted diseases. Health care professionals in the St. Clare Medical Outreach mobile van visit weekly to treat medical conditions such as diabetes and high blood pressure. Those requiring further testing, procedures and/or surgery receive it, free of charge, from specialists at the St. Joseph Medical Center.

Additional services include clothing giveaways and a Technology Resource Center that offers free Internet access, help with basic computer skills, financial literacy and resume building.
