= Stetson House =

Historic house in Massachusetts, United States

- U.S. National Register of Historic Places
- U.S. Historic district – Contributing property
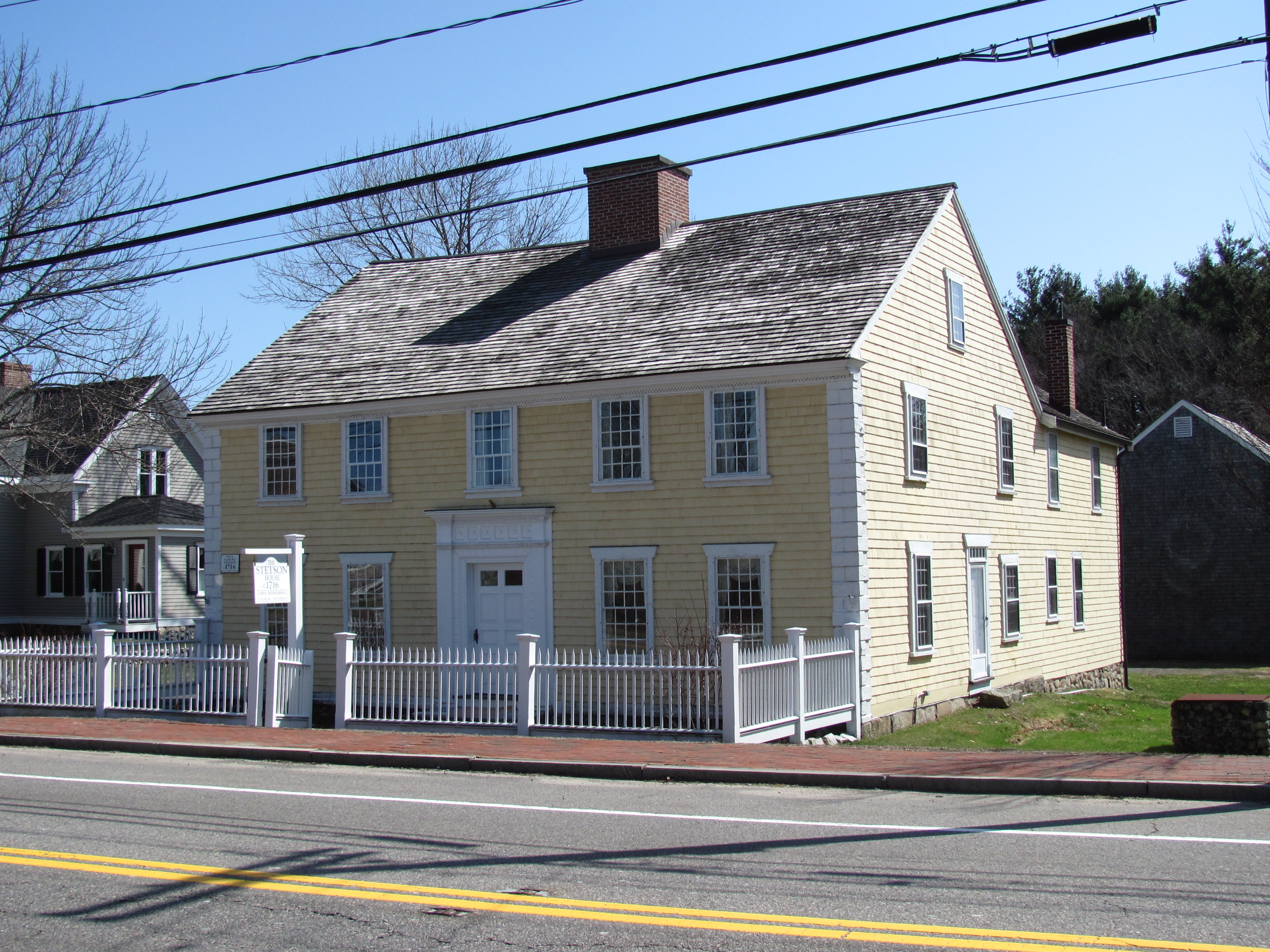
- Stetson House

- Location within Massachusetts Location within the United States
- Location: Hanover, Massachusetts
- Coordinates: 42°6′58″N 70°50′39″W
- Built: 1694
- Part of: Hanover Center Historic District (ID96000476)
- NRHP reference No.: 79000366

Significant dates
- Added to NRHP: September 7, 1979
- Designated CP: May 9, 1996

The Stetson House is a historic house at Hanover Street in Hanover, Massachusetts. The 2 1/2-story frame house was built c. 1694 by Samuel "Drummer" Stetson and was occupied by the Stetson family until at least the 1860s. During the 19th century the family opened the house for religious services after the church burned down.

== Description and history ==
In the Common room there is a large fireplace (one of six in the house) and a Yule log that was lit for good luck on Christmas but was never allowed to burn all the way. At the church, if you fell asleep a person would tickle you with a feather attached to a tithing rod. It was above the fireplace. A grandfather clock made by John Bailey and given to the Stetson house was too big to fit in the house so they had to cut a depression in the floor. The mother Stetson sometimes baked pies in the deep oven and at about 4:00pm called the children to supper.

People donated furniture for the Music Room. Also in the Music room there is a portrait of John Barstow and his wife Betsy Ellen. Four front windows have special glass, each with 24 panes. The dining room is not used often, only on special occasions like Christmas or Thanksgiving.

The doors between the rooms were made crooked on purpose so that they would close by themselves and not let the heat out. Most of the rooms were not heated and foot warmers were used in the winter. The Stetson House now acts as a museum for the town of Hanover, with its rooms being dedicated to the towns agricultural, manufacturing, maritime, and military histories. The house was listed on the National Register of Historic Places in 1979, and included in the Hanover Center Historic District in 1996.

== See also ==
- National Register of Historic Places listings in Plymouth County, Massachusetts
