= Humarock =

Village in Scituate, Massachusetts, US

Coordinates: 42°08′10″N 70°41′26″W

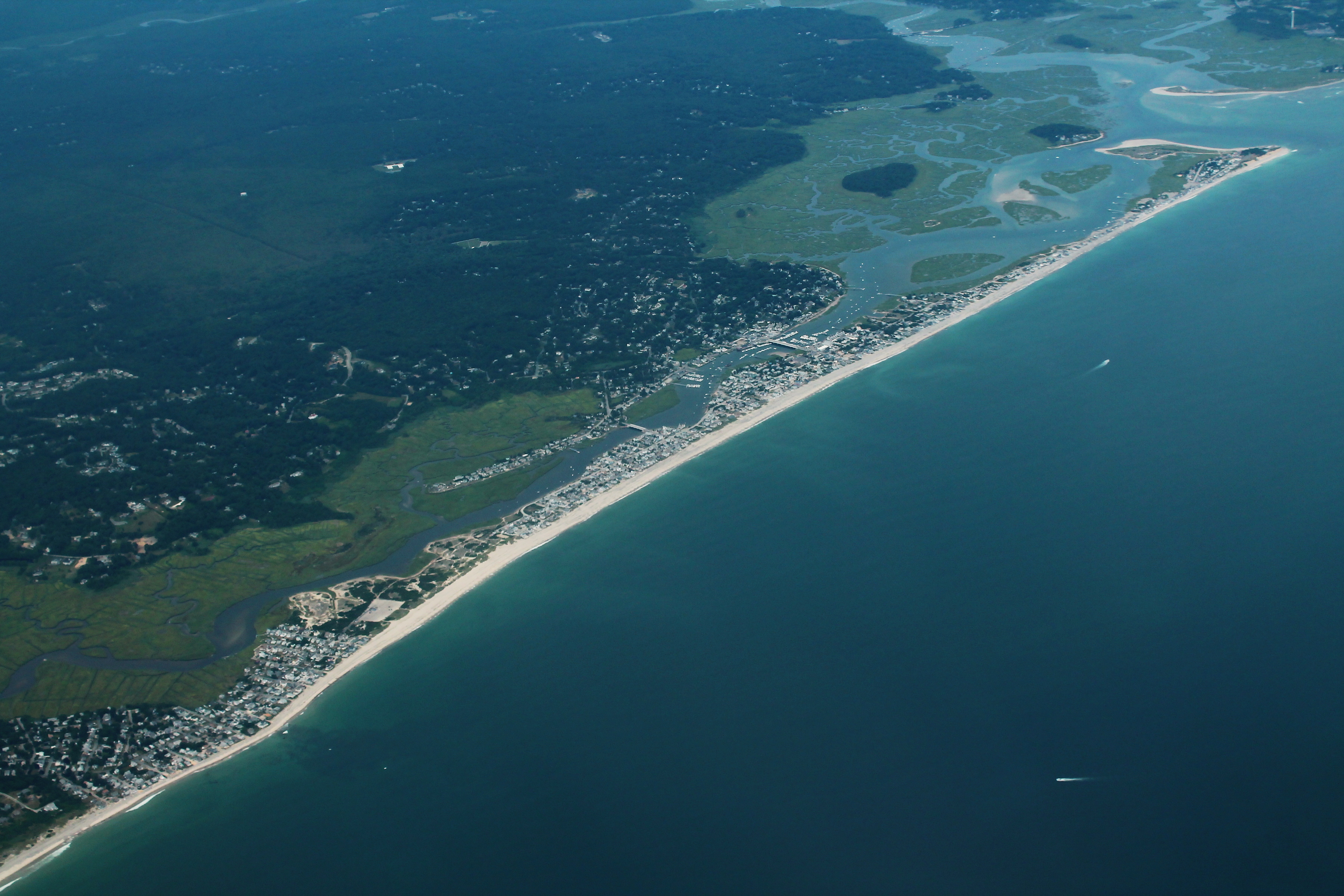
Aerial view of Humarock

Humarock (often called Humarock Beach or Humarock Island) is part of Scituate, Massachusetts, United States. Humarock is a picturesque seaside village surrounded by water and situated on Cape Cod Bay midway between Boston and Plymouth. It was separated from the rest of the town in the Portland Gale of 1898 in which the mouth of the North River shifted. Humarock is now accessible from Scituate only by boat or from the Town of Marshfield by bridge.

== The peninsula ==
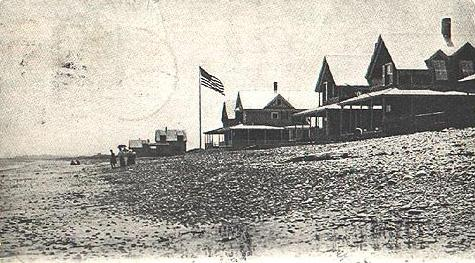
Humarock Beach c. 1907. Although the sea wall has not yet been built, both the appearance of these houses and the countless rocks on the beach still characterize Humarock.

The common perception that Humarock is an island is supported by the fact that the place is accessed by boat or by crossing bridges that span the South River. However, Humarock is clearly a very long, slender peninsula rather than an island as can be seen in aerial images of the area.

To reach Humarock over land one would have to walk through a large dune or Rexhame Beach.

== The separation ==
The coast of Scituate is marked by four distinct bluffs, running from First Cliff on the northern end of the town's coast down to Fourth Cliff in the southern end. Prior to the Portland Gale, Humarock was connected to the Scituate mainland at Third Cliff. The North River flowed south between Fourth Cliff and Marshfield, joined the South River, and entered Massachusetts Bay two kilometers to the south of the current opening.

A thin strip of beach which connected Third Cliff to Fourth Cliff was breached by the storm surge of the Portland Gale of 1898, separating Humarock from the rest of Scituate. Eventually the old inlet silted in, forcing the South River to flow north between Marshfield and Fourth Cliff where it now joins the North River to enter the ocean.

Although Humarock is now connected by land to the Rexhame section of Marshfield, there are no roads across the old inlet. As a result, Fourth Cliff and the rest of the Humarock part of Scituate are only accessible via the Marshfield Avenue and Julian Street bridges from Marshfield.

The change in course of the North River also increased the salinity of the large marsh in the area surrounding the current outlet, resulting in the loss of the valuable salt haying business.

== Etymology ==
The name "Humarock" is often said to come from the Wampanoag language and have had a meaning like "seashell place" or "rock carving." However, this etymology can be traced back to Edward Rowe Snow, a Marshfield writer better-known for his imagination than his attention to historical accuracy.

The common belief that the name is a corruption of "Humming Rocks" (referring to the crash of the surf) does not seem implausible, but historical records suggest that the origin of the name lies in the word "hummock" i.e. a hill near a marsh. As early as 1732 town records refer to the Fourth Cliff area as "Humock Flatt" or "Hummock Flats" and other variants. The record of a shipwreck by this spot in 1847 is noted as off "Hummock Beach." The Scituate town map of 1879 labels the peninsula south of Fourth Cliff as "Shore Hummock".

The shoreline of Humarock is characterized by the presence of innumerable roughly fist-sized, smooth, flattened rocks and these were even more prevalent before the Blizzard of '78. The name "Hummock Rock-beach" became "Humarock Beach" and finally "Humarock".
