= Portland Gale =

1898 New England storm

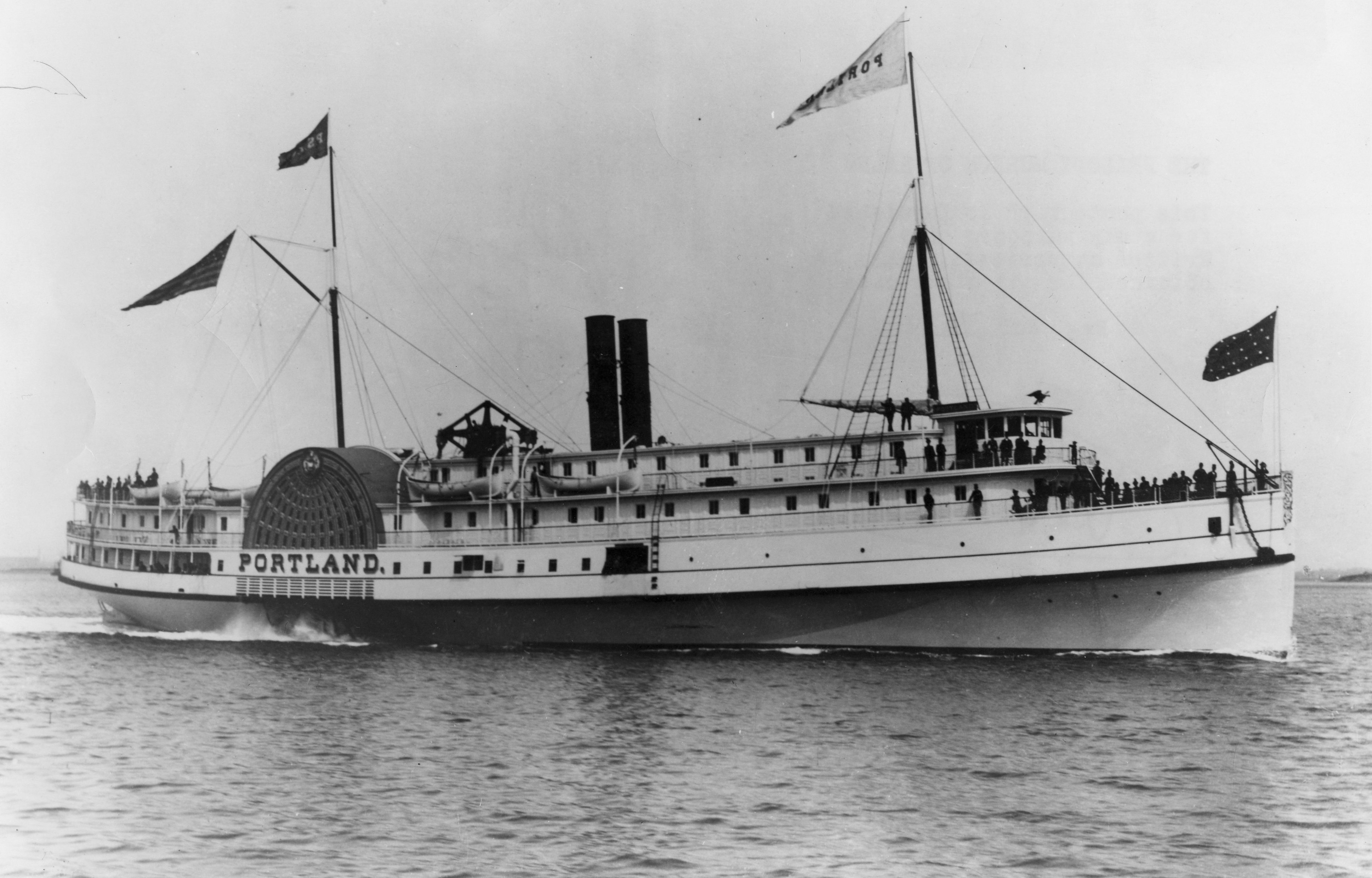
Last picture made of the SS Portland

The Portland Gale was a storm that struck the coast of New England on November 26 and 27, 1898. The storm formed when two low pressure areas merged off the coast of Virginia and travelled up the coast; at its peak, it produced a storm surge of about ten feet in Cohasset harbor and hurricane-force winds in Nantucket. The storm killed more than 400 people and sank more than 150 boats and ships. It also changed the course of the North River, separating the Humarock portion of Scituate, Massachusetts, from the rest of Scituate.

== Loss of the SS Portland ==
On November 26, 1898, the steamship SS Portland left India Wharf in Boston, Massachusetts, for Portland, Maine, on a regularly scheduled run. She never made it to port. None of the 192 passengers and crew survived the massive storm that wreaked havoc on New England's coast – a storm that was later dubbed "the Portland Gale" after the tragic loss of the ship.

For years, controversy reigned as to the location of the ill-fated ship. In the summer of 2002, Stellwagen Bank National Marine Sanctuary, joined by the National Undersea Research Center at the University of Connecticut (UConn), solved the mystery surrounding the Portland's location. Using data from American Underwater Search and Survey, they brought back images from the sea floor that conclusively identified the remains of the steamship Portland.

Researchers from NOAA's Stellwagen Bank National Marine Sanctuary, along with the NOAA-UConn team and filmmakers from The Science Channel, returned to the wreck of the famed 19th-century steamship from September 13–18, 2003. Kicking off the expedition to peer into the vessel's past and plan for its future, the team conducted the first surveys of the Portland since its location was confirmed in August 2002 within NOAA's Stellwagen Bank National Marine Sanctuary off the Massachusetts coast.

In addition to documenting the Portland, the expedition team investigated the wrecks of the Louise B. Crary and Frank A. Palmer, a pair of Boston-bound coal schooners that collided and sank in 1902 as a result of a navigational error. Like the Portland, the Crary and Palmer lie within the boundaries of Stellwagen Bank National Marine Sanctuary. Side-scan sonar images obtained in 2002 during a joint mission between NOAA and NURC-UConn revealed that the two large vessels plunged to the sea floor simultaneously, their bows locked together in a deadly embrace. Schooners Columbia and Delaware also sank in the gale.

== Damage to coastal towns ==
Dozens of houses were destroyed in each of the towns along the South Shore of Massachusetts. Coastal railroads were damaged in Scituate and in Hull, telegraph and electric lines were severed, and the ferris wheel and roller coaster in Hull were destroyed. The Duxbury pier was damaged, beaches were badly eroded, and dozens of ships and boats were wrecked on the beaches.

== Change to the course of the North River ==
The southern coast of Scituate, Massachusetts, is marked by four distinct flaws, running from First Cliff on the northern end of the town's coast down to Fourth Cliff in the southern end. The area surrounding and including Fourth Cliff is called Humarock. Prior to the Portland Gale, the North River flowed south between Fourth Cliff and Marshfield, Massachusetts, joining the South River and entering the ocean two kilometers to the south of the current opening. A thin strip of beach, which connected Third Cliff to Fourth Cliff, was breached by the storm, leaving Fourth Cliff an island. Eventually the old inlet has silted in, forcing the South River to flow north between Marshfield and Fourth Cliff, where it now joins the North River to enter the ocean between Third and Fourth Cliffs. Although Fourth Cliff is now connected by land to Marshfield, north of Rexhame Beach, there are no roads across the old inlet. As a result, Fourth Cliff and the rest of the Humarock part of Scituate are only accessible via the Marshfield Avenue and Julian Street bridges from Marshfield. The change to the course of the North River also increased the salinity of the large marsh area surrounding the current outlet, resulting in the loss of the valuable salt haying business.
