= Sisters of St. Francis of Assisi =

Catholic religious congregation for women

- Formation: 1849; 177 years ago
- Type: Women's religious order
- Legal status: Active
- Headquarters: Wisconsin
- Director: Sister Joanne Schatzlein, osf

The Sisters of St. Francis of Assisi is a Catholic religious congregation for women founded in 1849. The motherhouse is in St. Francis, Wisconsin, in the Archdiocese of Milwaukee.

The Sisters share their original founders with daughter congregations the Franciscan Sisters of Perpetual Adoration and the Franciscan Sisters of the Eucharist.

== History ==
On March 13, 1849, six women and five men, lay third-order Franciscans from Ettenbeuren, Bavaria, along with Father Francis Anthony Keppeler and Father Mathias Steiger, of the parish of Our Lady of the Assumption, set sail for America at the request of Bishop John Henni to the newly organized diocese of Milwaukee, Wisconsin.

It was agreed that the brothers and sisters would live in separate areas of the house. One married man and a married woman would be in charge of domestic and external affairs of the house and the others would be obedient to them. It was also determined that the group would care for two teachers and offer free board and lodging to poor children who lived too far from the mission.

Arriving on the Hermann, the group reached New York on April 13, 1849. On May 28, Foundation Day, the Brothers and Sisters presented themselves to Bishop Henni. He advised them to settle at the southern tip of Milwaukee Bay, approximately four miles from the heart of the city in an area known as Nojoshing. The title deed dated June 11, 1849, represented the 35.67 acres of virgin forest purchased for $1,000 from Henry and Eva Gross. An additional four acres were purchased from James S. and Elizabeth McFadden for $100.

Construction began on a convent – a square, one-story frame building 16 feet high with an enclosed 20-by-20-yard courtyard with a well in the center. Separate housing for the Brothers would also be built. Meanwhile, they lived in a log house, 16 feet long and 10 feet wide with an altar, kitchen, and fireplace. The Brothers and Sisters lived in boarding huts nearby. In 1856 Bishop Henni asked the Sisters to help at St. Francis Seminary in Milwaukee, built for German-speaking aspirants to the priesthood. In 1871 the Motherhouse of the Sisters of the Third Order Regular of St. Francis was established in La Crosse, Wisconsin.

In 1873, Mother Antonia, believing that Seminary work was not an appropriate ministry for her sisters, asked the sisters in Milwaukee to discontinue that work. Thirty-seven sisters chose to remain in Seminary ministry. They became the Sisters of St. Francis of Assisi. The community in La Crosse separated and became known as the Franciscan Sisters of Perpetual Adoration.

== Present day ==
The motherhouse is located on the shores of Lake Michigan in St. Francis (Milwaukee), Wisconsin. St. Mary’s Academy closed in 1991. A new convent was built on the site, with the old Motherhouse to be demolished. Much of the stained glass, doors, and paintings were transferred to the new building.

The Sisters of St. Francis of Assisi, Milwaukee, are the founders and corporate sponsors of Cardinal Stritch University, established in 1937 as St. Clare's College, a teacher-training school for the Sisters. Special education became a major area of focus with the establishment of three residential facilities, St. Coletta Schools (Jefferson, Wisconsin, Palos Park, Illinois, and Hanover, Massachusetts, the latter now called the Cardinal Cushing Centers), and two day schools (Milwaukee and Braintree, Massachusetts). In 1989, they opened Juniper and Canticle Courts, two apartment complexes for the elderly.

On October 4, 2001, the Franciscan Sisters of Baltimore merged with the Sisters of St. Francis of Assisi. As of 2016 there are about 340 sisters in the community.

=== Poverello Creations ===
Poverello Creations is an expansion of "Poverello Prints", a small greeting card project to showcase sister artists, that helps to support the mission of the sisters.

== See also ==
- Third Order of St. Francis
- Franciscan Sisters of the Eucharist
