= Indian Head River =

Coordinates: 42.096°N 70.846°W

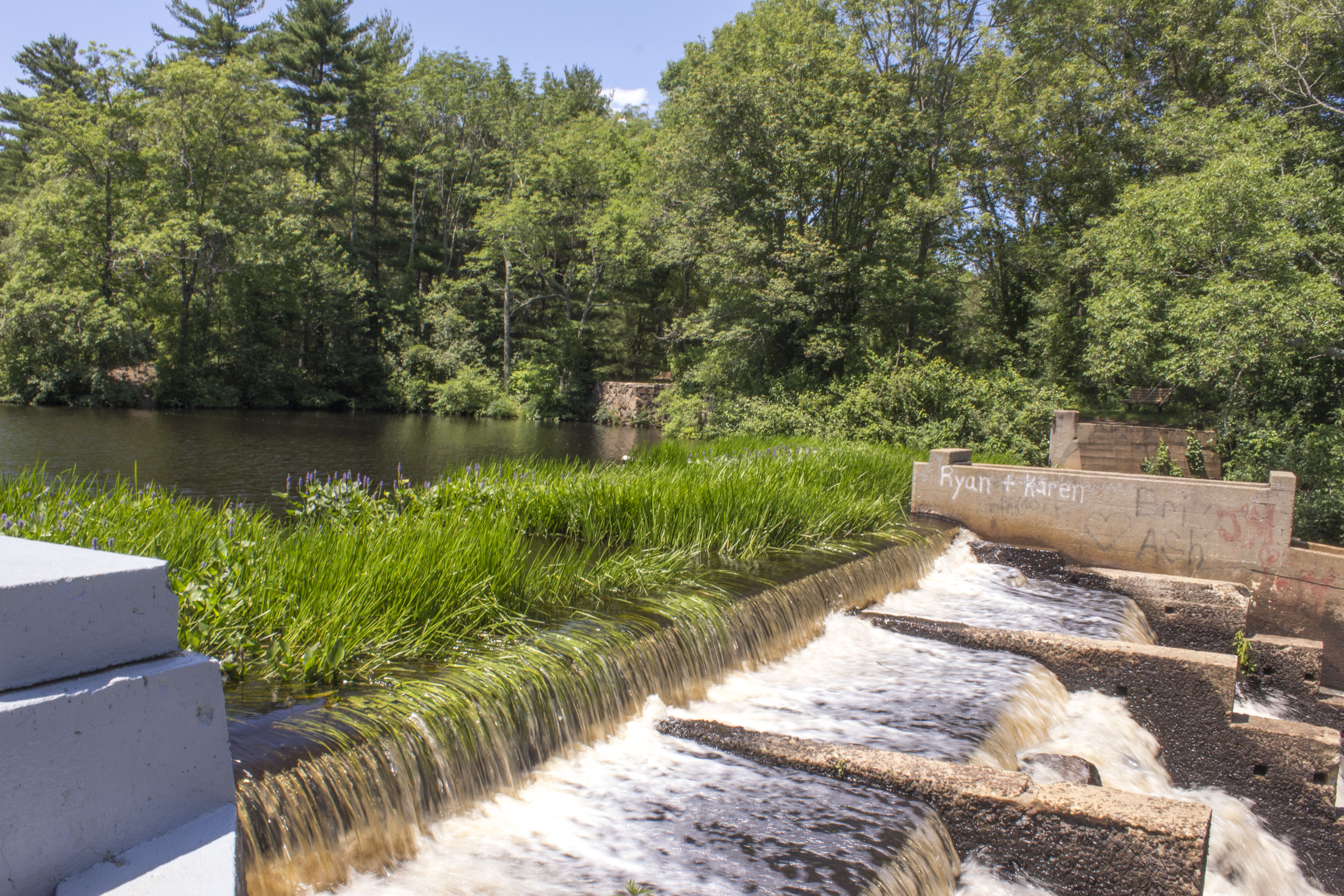
- The dam and fish ladder at the Indian Head River reservoir.

Physical characteristics
- Mouth
  - elevation: 3 ft (0.91 m)
- Length: 3.7 mi (6.0 km)

The Indian Head River rises on the southern boundary of Hanover, Massachusetts and northern boundary line of Hanson, Massachusetts at the intersection of tributaries from Drinkwater River in Hanover and Indian Head Brook in Hanson. The river then flows east along the Hanover-Pembroke border. The river, 3.7 miles (6.0 km) long, is a tributary of the North River, which flows into Massachusetts Bay. The Indian Head River was an important fishing and water pathway for the Massachuset Indian village of Mattakeeset which was located around the Pembroke Ponds.

== History ==
Several significant historic mills, factories, and dams were built along the Indian Head River. A dam at the crossing of the Indian Head River and State Street in Hanson marks the former site of Ezra Phillips & Sons Tack Factory. In 1812, James Reed constructed a gristmill on the Hanson side of the river at its intersection with Rocky Run Brook, then built a dam across the Indian Head River for a tack and nail factory. Immediately east of this site, the tack works of R. C. Waterman was constructed on the Hanover side of the Indian Head River off of Water St. The river next runs through Luddam's Ford Park, named after a guide, James Luddam, who in 1632 carried Governor John Winthrop across the river to get to Weymouth. The former site of the Eugene H. Clapp Rubber Company, built in 1873, is located on the Hanover side of Luddam's Ford Park, south of Water Street and west of Elm Street. A strip of rubber along the river on the Pembroke side remains which people may bounce on. The Indian Head River then continues east past West Elm Street in Pembroke and intersects with Barker's Brook, where it forms the North River.

There is a plaque that is embedded in the wall on a bridge on Elm Street that crosses the river. The plaque says:

"The Bay Path at Luddam's Ford across the Indian Head River the boundary line between
HANOVER
1632 Gov. Winthrop crossed here on the back of James Luddam, his Guide.
Site of Saw Mill 1693
Bardin Iron Works 1704
Curtis Anchor Works 1791
PEMBROKE
Anchor for the Warship Constitution made here in 1797
A Grist Mill 1832
Carding Mill 1839
Clapp Rubber Co. 1873"

== Habitat ==
Mercury pollution and other heavy metal pollution left behind from the National Fireworks Company site on Factory Pond and the Drinkwater River in Hanover, and the Eugene H. Clapp Rubber Company at Luddam's Ford Park still pollute the Indian Head River bed, making it unsafe to drink the water and eat the fish.

The series of historic dams along the Indian Head River have prevented fish from easily swimming upstream. However, a fish ladder was constructed at Luddam's Ford Park. For two weeks during the summer, the herring run up stream to spawn. If herring are caught they must be released and no motor boats are allowed. The river is stocked with trout. It also has a small beaver (Castor canadensis) population.
