= North River (Massachusetts Bay) =

Tidal river in Massachusetts, United States

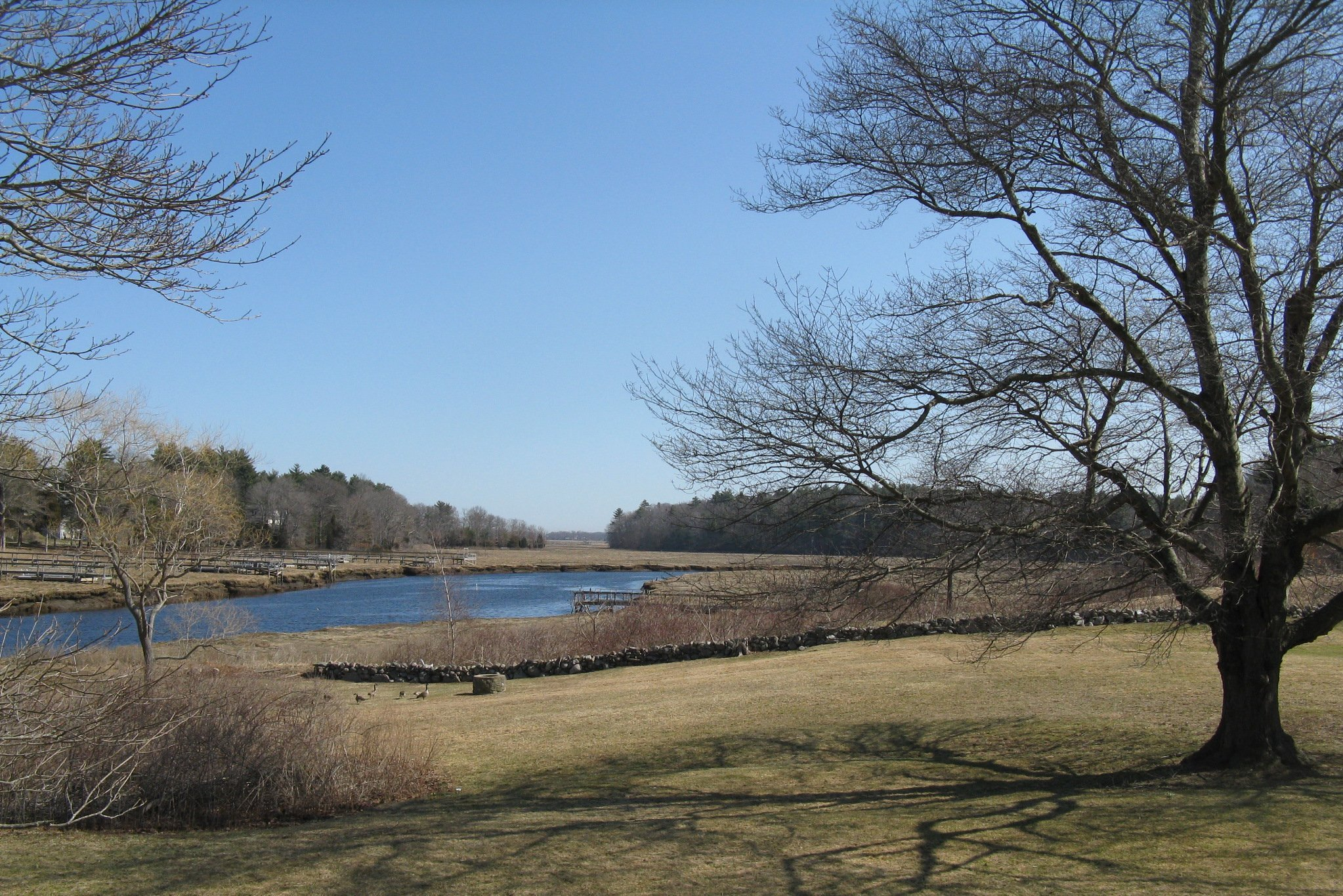
Marshfield bank of North River

The North River is a river, approximately 12 miles (19 km) long, in eastern Massachusetts, United States. It is primarily a tidal river, formed by the confluence of the Indian Head River and Herring Brook. The North River forms the boundary between the towns of Norwell, Pembroke, Hanover and downstream, the boundary between Scituate and Marshfield. The river flows into Massachusetts Bay at New Inlet, where it also converges with the mouth of the South River. The North River area is also known as the "Irish Riviera" due to the large Irish American population that migrated during the 19th century.

== Fishing ==
The North River is primarily a habitat for striped bass and bluefish. As the tide rapidly changes both the bass and bluefish get trapped in the shallows. The most common shallows occur by the flats of the river. These flats are approximately half a mile wide and one mile long. During the spring, when schools of striped bass and bluefish are most active, is the best time to fish by the flats, either by boat or on land.

== Boating ==
The North River is a popular river for kayakers as well as for small boats. There are several locations to load into the water. One at Bridge Street in Norwell, Union Street in Marshfield, Chittenden Lane in Norwell, Driftway Park in Scituate and upriver close towards the end of the North River in Hanover, there is a public boat launch off of Indian Head Drive. The North River ends in Hanover/Pembroke at Luddams Ford. The water upstream from the Luddams Ford dam is the Indian Head River. The North and South Rivers Watershed Association has a kayak guide and map explaining more about using the rivers. Tide is a major factor in determining timing of putting in and taking out. The North and South Rivers Watershed Association has an offset tide table for different locations along the river. Public parking is available at these locations.

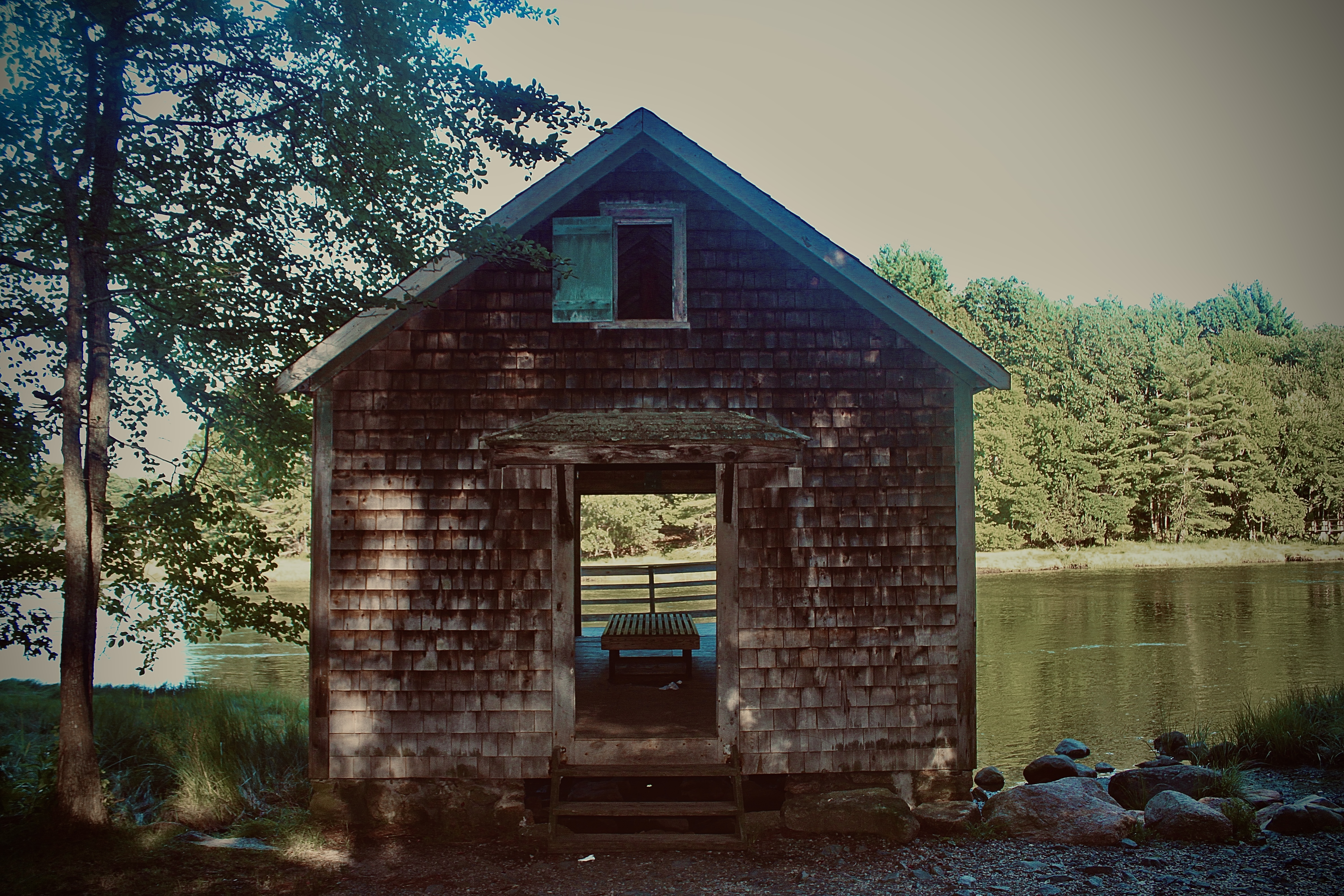
Observation and fishing cabin set into and above the North River in Norwell's Norris Reservation.

== History ==
The North River was host to the Fox Hill Shipyard which produced vessels up to 390 tons. The Fox Hill Shipyard produced over 56 vessels between 1690–1869. The heaviest vessel that was created was the Hilo. The very first ship launched by the shipyard was the Orient, weighing 42 tons. The first two shipbuilders on the river were Nathaniel Church and John Palmer.

Prior to the Portland Gale of 1898, the North River flowed south between Scituate's Humarock section and Marshfield, Massachusetts, joining the South River and entering the ocean several miles to the south of the current opening. The storm breached a thin strip of beach, which connected Scituate's Third and Fourth Cliffs, leaving Humarock an island. Eventually the old inlet has silted in, forcing the South River to flow north between Marshfield and Humarock, where it now joins the North River to enter the ocean between Third and Fourth Cliffs. Although Humarock is now connected by land to Marshfield, North of Rexhame Beach, there are no roads across the old inlet. As a result, Humarock is only accessible via the Marshfield Avenue and Julian Street bridges from Marshfield. The change to the course of the North River also increased the salinity of the large marsh area surrounding the current outlet, resulting in the loss of the valuable salt haying business. On the river itself, there were multiple landings throughout the towns for packet boats. Whites Ferry in Marshfield and Barry's Landing in Scituate were the first stops for the ships, then they would go down the North River to Hobart's Landing in Pembroke and the Wanton/Fox Hill Shipyards in Norwell, then eventually to the last stop on the river at Barstow's Bridge/Shipyard in Hanover.

The North River was also host to Whites Ferry shipyard and Barstows Two Oaks shipyard from the 17th through the 19th century.
