= Franciscan Center of Tampa =

Church in Tampa, United States

Franciscan Center

Religion
- Affiliation: Roman Catholic
- Leadership: Sister Mary Arghittu, O.S.F.
- Status: Active spiritual retreat

Location
- Location: 3010 North Perry Avenue, Tampa, Florida, US
- Interactive map of Franciscan Center
- Coordinates: 27.9730°N 82.4800°W

Architecture
- Type: Spiritual retreat
- Completed: 1970

The Franciscan Center, named to honor St. Francis of Assisi, is located on east side of the Hillsborough River, in the Riverside Heights residential area of Tampa, Florida. The center, on 8-acre (32,000 m^{2}), is designed to be a spiritual retreat center for people of all faiths. It is considered in the same nonprofit category as a church. It began when Joseph Miyares, a local attorney, donated property to be converted into the Franciscan Center.

The Franciscan Center's main building is two stories high. It has facilities to host various sizes of meetings and has forty-two bedrooms for guests. The Sabbath House, to the south of the main building, is a smaller building that can accommodate smaller meetings. The Pavilion was built in 2008 to accommodate outside meetings along the Hillsborough River.
