= Pilgrim Ordnance Works =

Coordinates: 42°6′15.73″N 70°52′7.71″W

Pilgrim Ordnance Works was a magnesium grinding plant located in West Hanover, Massachusetts that operated under contract from the National Fireworks Inc. to produce tracer ammunition materials between 1942 and 1943. Today, the former buildings and industrial yards serve as commercial business and corporate offices. Before the fireworks and ammunition plants were installed, the area was mostly wooded with an anchor and iron forge sitting on Forge Pond near by.

== See also ==
- List of military installations in Massachusetts
