= Cardinal Cushing Centers =

- Cardinal Cushing Center Historic District
- U.S. National Register of Historic Places
- U.S. Historic district
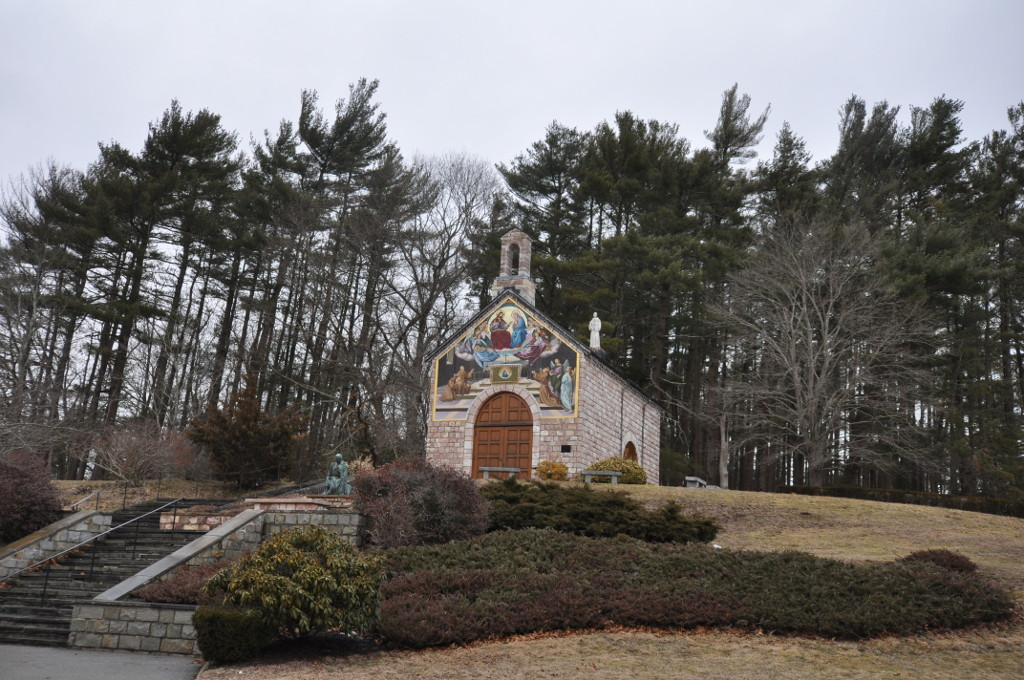
- Portiuncula Chapel

- Location within Massachusetts Location within the United States
- Location: 369 Washington St., Hanover, Massachusetts
- Coordinates: 42°7′1″N 70°49′13″W
- Area: 175 acres (71 ha)
- Architectural style: Colonial Revival
- NRHP reference No.: 100002782
- Added to NRHP: August 10, 2018

The Cardinal Cushing Centers are a set of education and support facilities for developmentally and intellectually challenged adults and children operated by the Sisters of St. Francis of Assisi. The centers offer education, training, residential and employment services, and recreational facilities on a campus at 369 Washington Street in Hanover, Massachusetts. Opened in 1949 as St. Coletta's by the Sea through the efforts of Archbishop Richard Cushing and with funding from the Kennedy family, the center was one of the first of its kind in the nation, and was renamed in Cushing's honor in 1974. The campus was listed on the National Register of Historic Places in 2018.

== Campus ==
The Cushing Center campus is located in northern Hanover on 175 acres (71 ha) roughly bisected by Washington Street. The principal administrative and service buildings are located in a cluster north of Washington Street, and include a suite of brick buildings with Georgian Revival styling, as well as two repurposed farmhouses acquired with the property. To the south of Washington Street, the stone Portiuncula Chapel stands on a hill between Washington and Columbia Streets, and there is a large cluster of primarily residential buildings further to its east.

Archbishop Richard Cushing of the Roman Catholic Archdiocese of Boston was the driving force behind the creation of the center, purchasing land for its campus in 1947 after appealing to Kennedy family patriarch Joseph P. Kennedy Sr. for financial support. The school was modeled on St. Coletta's by the Sea, founded in Jefferson, Wisconsin in 1904 by the Sisters of St. Francis of Assisi. Cushing appealed to the Sisters to own and operate the facility. The existing farmhouses on the property, now Fatima Hall and the Culinary Arts Building, were adapted for the facility's use, and a series of brick buildings were constructed. The Portiuncula Chapel was added in 1953.

The center opened in 1947 with 35 children, and grew in the following decade. Cushing again appealed to the Kennedy family, which provided further funding for additional residential space which was added in 1957. Cushing remained involved in the facility until his death in 1970, and is buried on its grounds. The center was renamed in his honor in 1974. It continued to grow, with new facilities added in 1990s and 2000s, and was expanded to included facilities for adults in the 2010s.

== See also ==
- National Register of Historic Places listings in Plymouth County, Massachusetts
