= Hanover, Massachusetts =

- Town
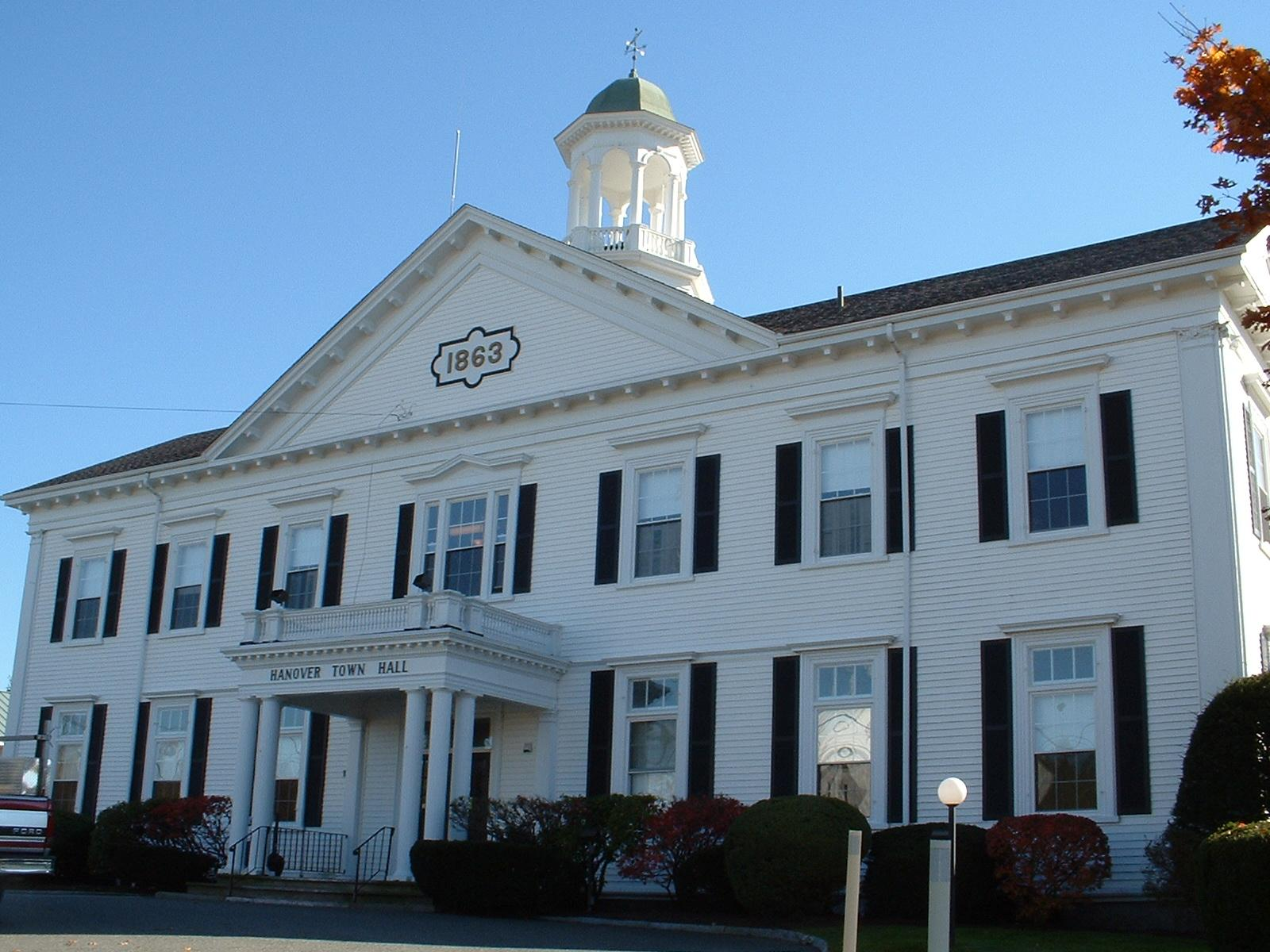
- Hanover Town Hall

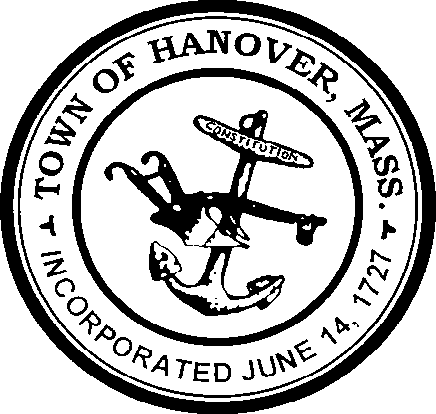
- Seal

- Location in Plymouth County in Massachusetts
- Coordinates: 42°7′N 70°49′W
- Country: United States
- State: Massachusetts
- County: Plymouth
- Settled: 1649
- Incorporated: 1727

Government
  - Type: Open town meeting

Area
  - Total: 15.7 sq mi (40.7 km^{2})
  - Land: 15.6 sq mi (40.4 km^{2})
  - Water: 0.12 sq mi (0.3 km^{2})
- Elevation: 59 ft (18 m)

Population (2020)
  - Total: 14,833
  - Density: 951/sq mi (367.2/km^{2})
- Time zone: UTC−5 (Eastern)
  - Summer (DST): UTC−4 (Eastern)
- ZIP Code: 02339
- Area code: 339/781
- FIPS code: 25-28285
- GNIS feature ID: 0618341
- Website: www.hanover-ma.gov

Hanover is a town in Plymouth County, Massachusetts, United States. The population was 14,833 at the 2020 census.

== History ==
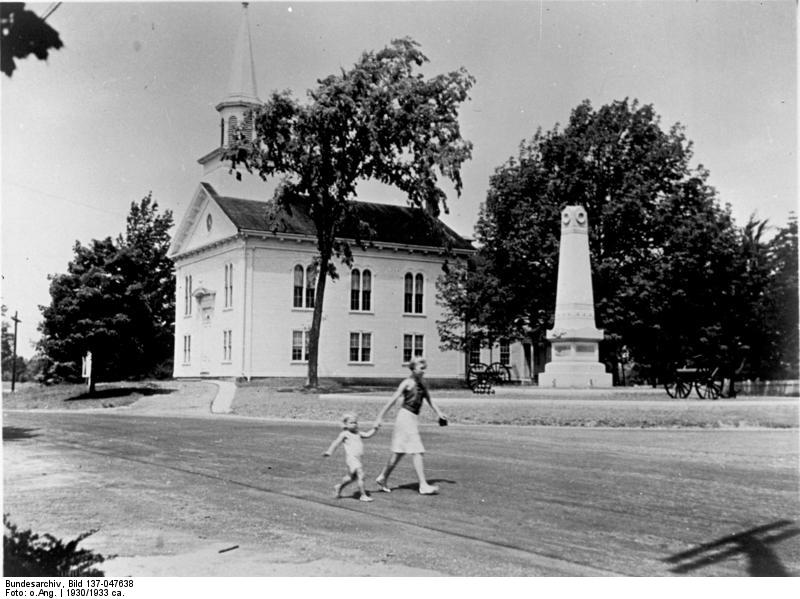
The First Congregational Church of Hanover in 1930

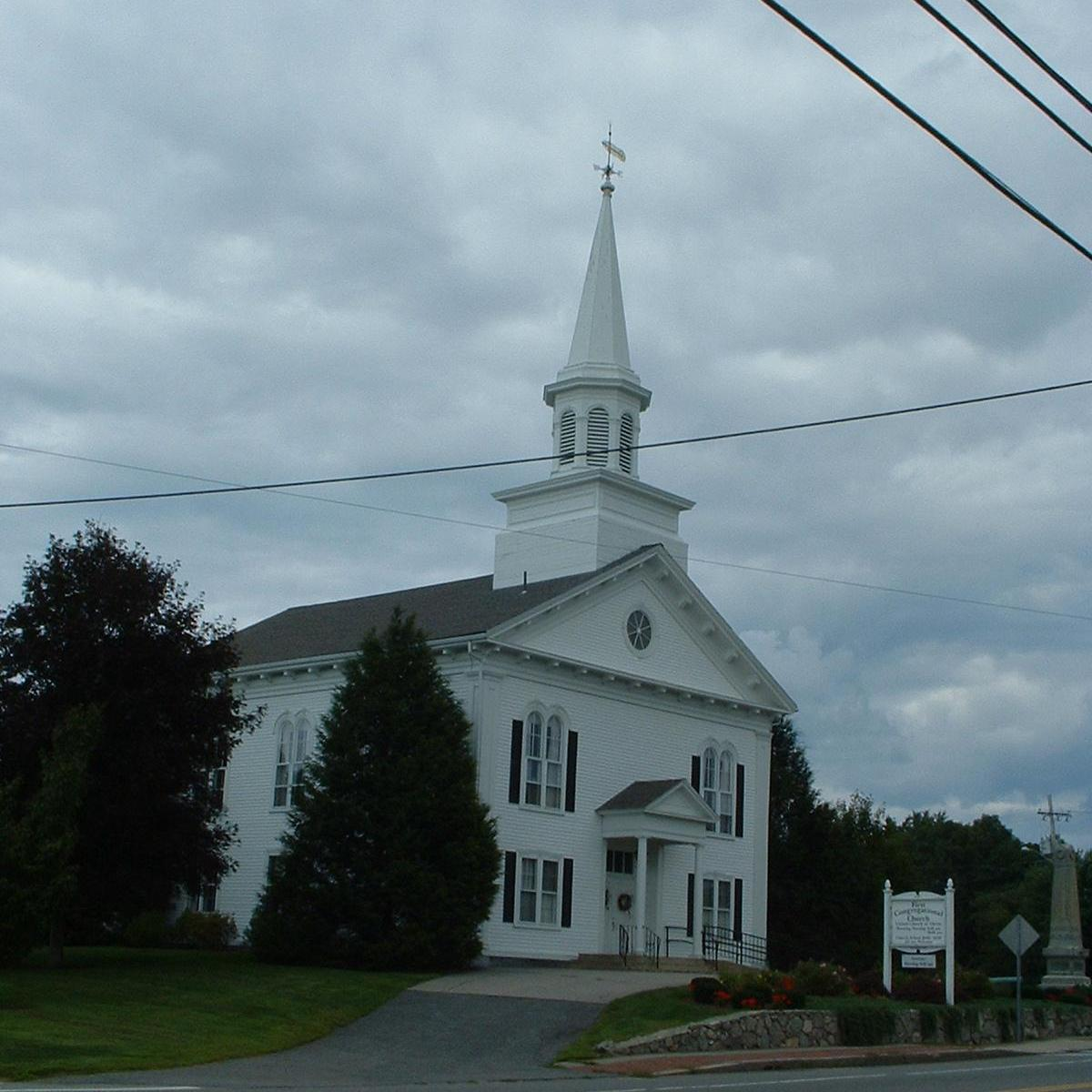
The First Congregational Church of Hanover in 2003

The area of Hanover was first inhabited by the local Wampanoag and Massachusett people before Europeans had settled. According to local history, there were a few documented sites being within the modern day border of Hanover, with one being in Assinippi, one in Pine Island Swamp, and the last being at Factory Pond, also known as Drinkwater Swamp. In the middle of the 17th century, the indigenous people were removed by force as waves of settlers from the British Isles started to migrate towards North America. The last of these natives in Hanover were removed in a small skirmish that occurred at the Factory Pond area in the 1630s.

European settlement began when the land was settled by English settlers from Scituate in 1649 when William Barstow, a farmer, built a bridge along the North River at what is now Washington Street. When Barstow settled the town, he constructed a cabin that was located off what is known today as Oakland Avenue (formerly Back Street). According to Dwelley's History of Hanover (1849), Phineas Pratt of the Wessagusset Colony apparently spent a night crossing the Indian Head or North River in the Hanover/Pembroke area during his difficult journey from what is today Weymouth to Plymouth in 1623.

During its first decades of settlement, the land was the westernmost portion of the town of Scituate, and it would officially separate and be incorporated as a town on June 14, 1727. The name "Hanover" is probably a tribute to King George I, the first Hanoverian King of Great Britain. (While George I died on June 11, 1727, the reports would not have reached the colonies until after the town's incorporation.) The origin of the name "Hanover/Hannover" however, comes from the Middle Low German ho or hoch meaning high, and over meaning bank or shore.

There are six separate villages settled within the town; North Hanover, Four Corners, West Hanover, Hanover Center, South Hanover, and Assinippi. Each village originally had its own school district, general store, and post offices. Hanover's early industry revolved around farming, small mills, anchor forging, and several shipbuilding yards along the North River. The oldest building in Hanover with the best documentation to support it is the Daniel Turner house, built in the year 1693.

The ship named Grand Turk was built at Thomas Barstow's Two Oaks shipyard in Hanover along the North River. The ship was used by Elias Hasket Derby and was later adopted as the logo for Old Spice. The "first" Grand Turk, as it was known, was the first U.S. ship to trade with China and was a part of the Derby Mercantile House. The North River in

Hanover was also the home of eleven smaller shipyards, with larger ones being Smiths shipyard and Barstow's Lower Yard. Another well known ship that was built in Hanover was the Oeno, in 1821 at Barstow's Lower Yard. The ship was wrecked off the coast of Fiji in 1825. Later industries would include tack factories and shoe factories along the smaller waterways in the town. The town was the site of the invention of the first tack-making machine, and making tacks and fireworks were among the industries of the later 19th century for Hanover.

It is said that the old Cornet Stetson Mill that was built on the Hanover side of the Third Herring Brook, and burnt down during King Philip's War, was the oldest mill in America. On the Indian Head River, the E.H. Clapp Rubber Works was an industrial stronghold for the town during the nineteenth century, the original building is preserved at Luddam's Ford Park now. Immigrants from Ireland and the British Isles settled the lands of Hanover and the North River region, also many immigrants from Northern and Eastern Europe, specifically from Germany, Poland, Lithuania, and Scandinavia, immigrated into Hanover during the nineteenth century.

At one point, from the late 1920s to the early 1940s, locals of Hanover and other parts of the North River area referred to West Hanover as "Little Poland". Today, Hanover is mostly residential. The Hanover Crossing, along with Merchants Row and other shops, are located near the intersection of Routes 3 and 53. Hanover Center has many war memorials dedicated to veterans who fought and died in wars throughout United States history.

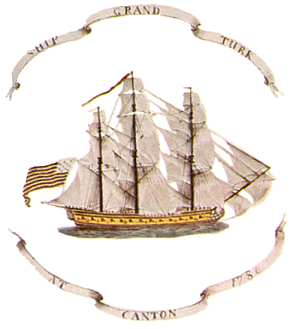
The first Grand Turk ship

During the American Revolution, Hanover sent Colonel John Bailey and his men to help defend Boston Harbor and Castle Island for the patriots. Later in the war, they were sent on expeditions to Rhode Island and Manchester, New Hampshire. The Four Corners area of the town was the site of Wales Tavern, which also hosted Paul Revere and Daniel Webster. An Iron Forge in West Hanover had also gone from producing anchors, to producing cannons and cannonballs. The westernmost shipping point on the North River was located at Chapman's Landing near Luddam's Ford. Iron would come from Humarock on ships traveling up the river to Chapman's Landing in Hanover, where the iron would be forged.

The Stetson family, in which created the famous hat company, originated in the North River area of Massachusetts. The Stetson family made some of their very first American homesteads in Hanover. Slavery was also present in the town prior to the 1783 abolishment of slavery in Massachusetts, as one of the most prominent slave owners in the town was Job Tilden. The Tilden family of Hanover came to Scituate from England in 1634, the same Tilden family that of Samuel J. Tilden.

During the mid to late 19th century, there was the Hanover Branch Railroad, which had stations from Hanover Four Corners to North Abington. It was deeded to the Old Colony Railroad system in 1887. In 1813, anchors for the ship the USS Constitution were made in Hanover at the Robert Salmond anchor forge, that was located at Luddam's Ford during the 1700 and 1800s. Hanover also had an airport called Clark Airport, that was operational from 1927 to 1958. It was located in West Hanover. During WWI and WWII the Pilgrim Ordnance Works in West Hanover made munitions for the war effort.

The Stetson House is also located in Hanover Center. Hanover Center is listed in the National Register of Historic Places as Hanover Center Historic District. The Four Corners area is where William Barstow's Two Oaks shipyard was. In the Southwest corner of the town, there was an anchor forge on Forge Pond, the rest of the area evolved into an industrial park that produced fireworks and ammunition that was controlled by the Pilgrim Ordnance Works. The Northeast served as a business sector for the town with much of Route 53 being enclosed with many shops, stores, restaurants, grocery stores, and outlets. The Cardinal Cushing Centers is also in the National Register of Historic Places, which is located at Hanover Four Corners. Richard Cushing is buried at the Portiuncula Chapel there, as Cardinal Cushing was the presiding minister during the funeral and burial of President John F. Kennedy. One of the oldest Boy Scouts troops in the United States was founded and is still active today in Hanover, Troop 1.

Hanover had several smaller shipyards during its development, however, the more prominent ones such as Barstow's Two Oaks shipyard and Lower Yards were better documented. Others such as Clarks Yard, Kingman Yard, and Wing Yard, and a shipyard that was owned by the family of Thatcher Magoun, also helped Hanover during its early development. The ships would sail down the North River and would bring pork, fish, beef, and oil, and would return with spices, rum, and sugar. At the height of the shipbuilding boom of 1812, it has been said that every Saturday night one would see at most 400 workers at the shipyards. Today, Hanover's shipyards are marked in the Four Corners area of the town, making it a point of interest.

== Geography ==
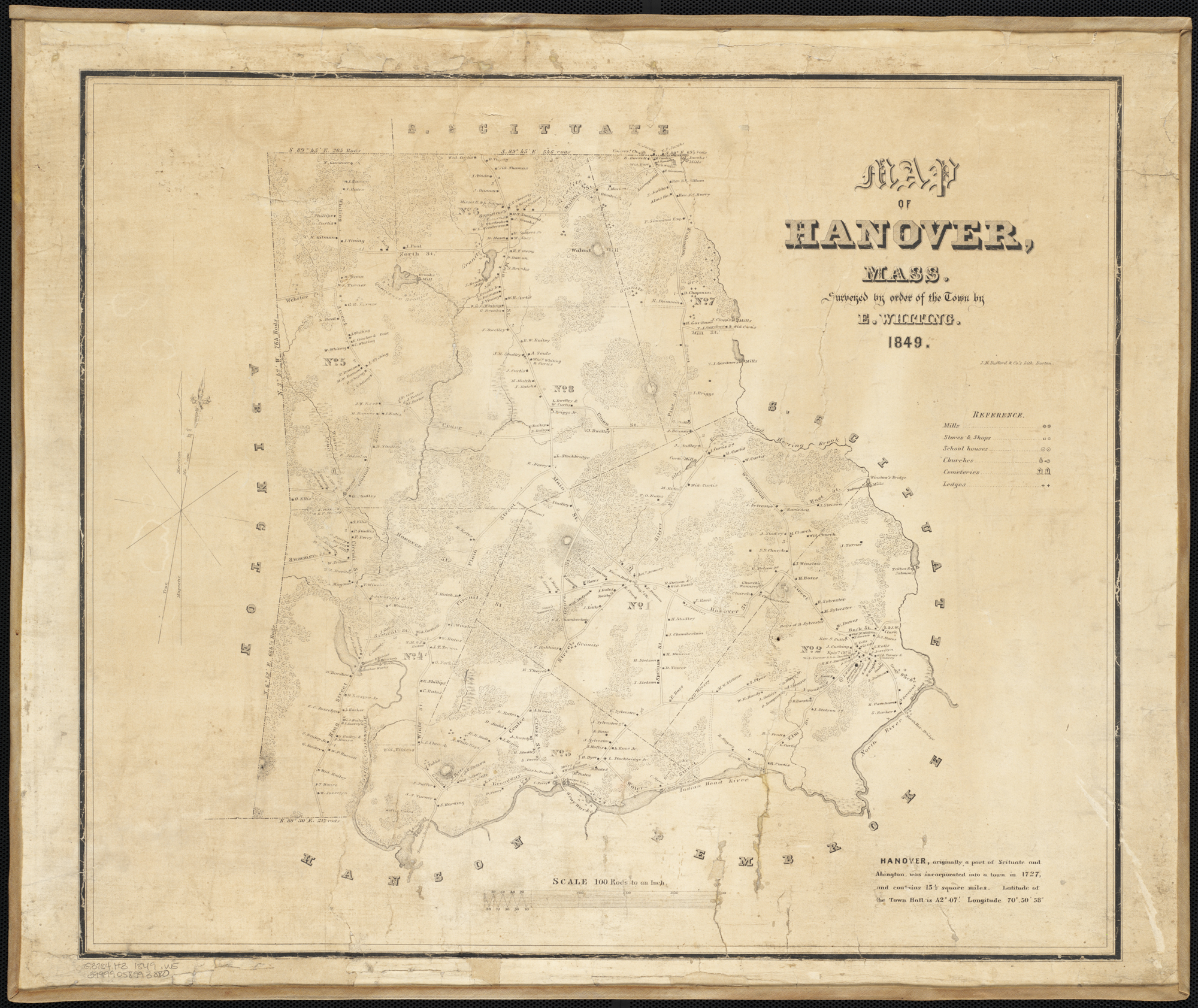
Map of Hanover, Massachusetts from 1849

According to the United States Census Bureau, the town has a total area of 15.7 square miles (41 km^{2}), of which 15.6 square miles (40 km^{2}) is land and 0.1 square miles (0.26 km^{2}), or 0.70%, is water. Hanover is the 240th town of 351 in the Commonwealth in terms of size. Hanover is considered to be a part of the South Shore of Massachusetts. It is bordered by Norwell to the north and east, Pembroke and Hanson to the south, and Rockland to the west and northwest. Hanover is approximately 10 miles (16 km) east of Brockton and 20 miles (32 km) southeast of Boston.

Much of Hanover's eastern and southern borders consist of three waterways, the North and Indian Head rivers along the south and southeast, and the Third Herring Brook along the east. (The latter two are both tributaries, and the town border is marked by their confluences.) There are also several small ponds and brooks throughout the town, the largest pond being Factory Pond, a tributary of the Indian Head River in the south of town. The town has several small parks, sanctuaries and conservation areas spread throughout the town. In South Hanover towards Winslow's Crossing, much of the area is covered by swamps and bogs. Most of West Hanover is flat woodlands, with streams that flow into Factory Pond.

The eastern section of Hanover is bordered by the North River and Third Herring Brook. From Chapman's Landing to where Third Herring starts, most of the shoreline is made of marshland or rocky edges. South Hanover into West Hanover has most of the town's smaller tributaries such as the Drinkwater River, French Stream, Iron Mine Brook, Cushing Brook, Longwater Brook, Shinglemill Brook, and the Silver Brook. Besides Factory Pond, Forge Pond and Hacketts Pond are the largest ponds in the town. The second-largest freshwater tidal marsh in Massachusetts is located on the North River banks of Hanover, towards the Third Herring Brook. The highest point in the town is Walnut Hill, located near Assinippi. Forge Pond park is a 40 acre recreational complex on King Street that includes baseball fields, softball fields, and walking trails.

=== Climate ===
Hanover enjoys a hot-summer humid continental climate (Köppen climate classification dfa). It has, however, characteristics of an oceanic climate due to its proximity to the Atlantic Ocean. Hanover has very cold, wet winters during which rainfall alternates with sunshine, sometimes for weeks. The town has warm to hot summers, with average rainfall in July and August of less than 3 inches (76 mm) per month.

Climate data for Hanover, MA, 1981–2010 normals, extremes 1913–present
| Month | Jan | Feb | Mar | Apr | May | Jun | Jul | Aug | Sep | Oct | Nov | Dec | Year |
|---|---|---|---|---|---|---|---|---|---|---|---|---|---|
Source: Bestplaces.net

== Demographics ==
Historical population
| Year | Pop. | ±% |
|---|---|---|
| 1790 | 1,084 | — |
| 1850 | 1,592 | +46.9% |
| 1860 | 1,565 | −1.7% |
| 1870 | 1,628 | +4.0% |
| 1880 | 1,897 | +16.5% |
| 1890 | 2,093 | +10.3% |
| 1900 | 2,152 | +2.8% |
| 1910 | 2,326 | +8.1% |
| 1920 | 2,575 | +10.7% |
| 1930 | 2,808 | +9.0% |
| 1940 | 2,875 | +2.4% |
| 1950 | 3,389 | +17.9% |
| 1960 | 5,923 | +74.8% |
| 1970 | 10,107 | +70.6% |
| 1980 | 11,358 | +12.4% |
| 1990 | 11,912 | +4.9% |
| 2000 | 13,164 | +10.5% |
| 2010 | 13,879 | +5.4% |
| 2020 | 14,833 | +6.9% |
| 2022* | 14,758 | −0.5% |
* = population estimate. Source: United States census records and Population Estimates Program data.

As of July 1, 2017, there were 14,814 people, 4,349 households, and 3,566 families residing in the town. The population density was 843.4 inhabitants per square mile (325.6/km^{2}). There were 4,445 housing units at an average density of 284.8 per square mile (110.0/km^{2}). The racial makeup of the town was 97.68% White, 0.55% African American, 0.08% Native American, 0.77% Asian, 0.01% Pacific Islander, 0.27% from other races, and 0.65% from two or more races. Hispanic or Latino of any race were 0.68% of the population.

There were 4,350 households, out of which 43.8% had children under the age of 18 living with them, 70.8% were married couples living together, 8.0% had a female householder with no husband present, and 18.0% were non-families. Of all households, 15.2% were made up of individuals, and 8.8% had someone living alone who was 65 years of age or older. The average household size was 3.02 and the average family size was 3.39.

In the town, the population was spread out, with 29.8% under the age of 18, 5.6% from 18 to 24, 28.8% from 25 to 44, 25.3% from 45 to 64, and 10.5% who were 65 years of age or older. The median age was 38 years. For every 100 females, there were 95.9 males. For every 100 females age 18 and over, there were 91.3 males.

The median income for a household in the town was $73,838, and the median income for a family was $86,835. Males had a median income of $57,321 versus $35,214 for females. The per capita income for the town was $30,268. About 1.4% of families and 2.3% of the population were below the poverty line, including 1.6% of those under age 18 and 7.8% of those age 65 or over.

== Government ==
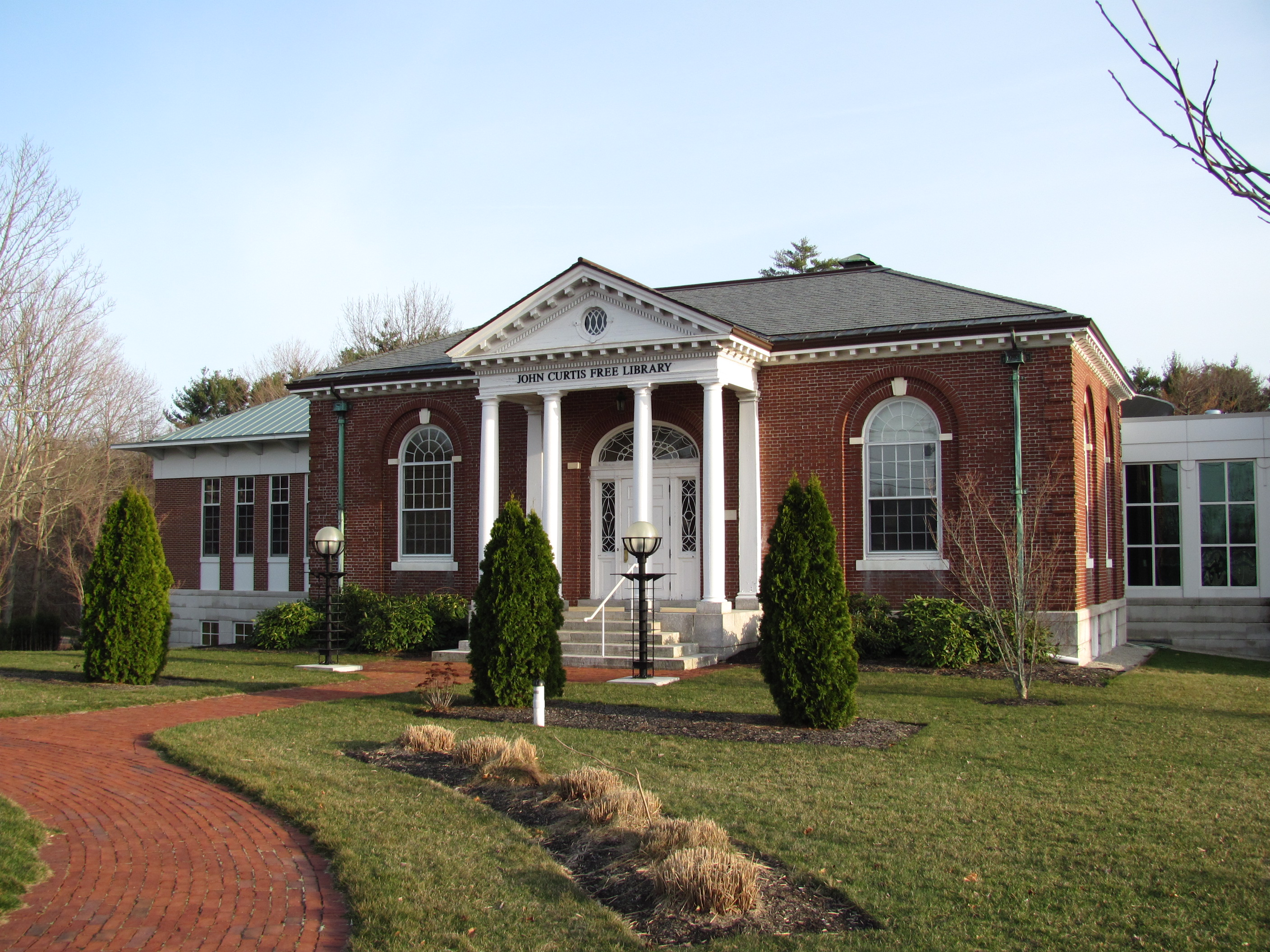
John Curtis Free Library

On the national level, Hanover is a part of Massachusetts's 9th congressional district, and is currently represented by William R. Keating. The state's senior (Class I) member of the United States Senate, elected in 2012, is Elizabeth Warren. The junior (Class II) senator, elected in a special election in 2013, is Ed Markey.

On the state level, Hanover is represented in the Massachusetts House of Representatives as a part of the Fifth Plymouth district, which includes the neighboring towns of Norwell and Rockland. The town is represented in the Massachusetts Senate as a part of the Second Plymouth and Bristol district, which includes Brockton, Halifax, Hanson, Whitman and portions of East Bridgewater and Easton. The town is patrolled on a secondary basis by the First Barracks of Troop D of the Massachusetts State Police, located in Norwell.

Hanover is governed by the open town meeting form of government, and is led by a board of selectmen. The town has its own police and fire departments, with active firehouses in Center Hanover and West Hanover. The fire department operates the ambulance service, with the nearest hospitals being Brockton Hospital and South Shore Hospital in Weymouth. There are two post offices located in town, near Hanover Four Corners and West Hanover, both along Route 139. The town is home to the John Curtis Free Library, which was founded with the help of its namesake in the 1800s. The library is a part of the Old Colony Library Network. Hanover is also the site of a YMCA, near the mall.

== Education ==
Hanover Public Schools

Location
- 188 Broadway Street, Hanover, MA 02339 United States

District information
- Type: Public
- Grades: K–12
- Superintendent: Matthew A. Ferron
- Schools: 5
- Budget: $30,896,679 total $11,261 per pupil

Students and staff
- Students: 2,638
- Teachers: 188
- Student–teacher ratio: 14.0 to 1

Other information
- Website: Hanover Public Schools

Hanover operates its own school system for the town's approximately 2,700 students. There are three elementary schools, the Cedar, Center and Sylvester Elementary Schools. The Cedar School serves students from pre-kindergarten through first grade, while the Center School serves students from second grade through fourth grade. The former fourth through 6th grade Sylvester school is now used for public services. The Hanover Middle School serves students from fifth through eighth grade, and Hanover High School serves students from ninth through twelfth grade. Hanover's teams are nicknamed the Hawks (previously the Indians) and their colors are blue and gold. Hanover competes in the Patriot League, and their chief rival is Norwell. Hanover finished building its new high school in 2012; the graduating class of that year was the first to graduate from the school and the second class to graduate on the new turf field. Hanover High School has also been known to have an outstanding graduation rate and expertise in preparing students for further academic fields.

Hanover is also the home of the South Shore Vocational Technical High School, which is located near the Hanover/Norwell shared village of Assinippi and serves the vocational needs of the surrounding communities. There are no private schools in the town; there are, however, private schools in the surrounding communities. The nearest colleges are Massasoit Community College in Brockton, and Bridgewater State University. The Cardinal Cushing Centers, a Catholic facility for intellectually and developmentally challenged individuals located on Washington Street, also has educational facilities.

== Notable people ==
- Lebbeus Bailey, eighteenth century clockmaker
- Amanda Barker, comedian and actress
- J. Williams Beal, successful architect and was the father of John W. Beal
- John W. Beal, successful architect who founded J. Williams Beal, Sons
- Chris Burke, actor and Down syndrome advocate. As a child, Burke moved to Hanover to go to the Cardinal Cushing School, and while attending, Burke took up an interest in acting where he was then noticed by Hollywood producer Robert Evans, thus starting Burke's career as an actor.
- George Washington Carver lived in a small cabin on the North River in Hanover for several months while he worked on his autobiography
- Richard Cushing, Archbishop of Boston for the Catholic Church from 1944 to 1970. He is buried in the Portiuncula Chapel at the Cardinal Cushing Centers
- Dennis di Cicco, amateur astronomer who discovered up to 60 minor planets and was the first person to photograph the analemma. He grew up in Hanover.
- R. C. Gamble, played running back for the Boston Patriots from 1968 to 1969. Resided in Hanover on Dillingham Way during the time
- Marvelous Marvin Hagler, former world middleweight boxing champion, resided in Hanover for several years at the peak of his career
- Mike Hardman, professional ice hockey player
- Elijah Hayward, politician from Bridgewater who learned shipbuilding in Hanover
- Nichole Hiltz, actress and was engaged to Canadian actor Mike Smith of Trailer Park Boys fame
- Jim Lonborg, Red Sox pitcher who worked as a dentist in Hanover
- Robert Nyman, politician who represented the Fifth Plymouth District
- Janet W. O'Brien, politician who represented the Fifth Plymouth District from 1991 to 1999
- Faith Salie, the actress lived in town for a few years after her birth. She is also a presenter on CBS.
- Albert Smith, politician, was born in Hanover in 1793
- Doug Smith, author and minor-league hockey player. Wrote a biography that was later adapted into the 2011 film Goon
- Joseph Smith, son of sea captain and shipbuilder Albert Smith. The Smith family resided Washington Street in Four Corners, and operated a shipyard that was in Hanover. Smith was a rear admiral for the United States Navy during the Civil War. Smith's son, Joseph B. Smith, was killed in action during the Battle of Hampton Roads. The ships USS Smith (DD-17) and USS Smith (DD-378) were both named in honor of Joseph the younger.
- William Stockbridge, ship owner and merchant who was active in Yarmouth, Maine
- Samuel Whitcomb Jr., politician
- Colin White, forward for the NHL's Florida Panthers
- Donnell Young, a sprinter in the men's 200 meters at the 1912 Summer Olympics

== Transportation ==
A short, three-mile portion of Massachusetts Route 3, a four-lane freeway, passes through the town, providing access via an exit at Route 53 in the northeast corner of town. The town's other major routes include Route 123 and Route 139, the latter passing through the town center. Routes 139 and 53 are coextensive for a stretch of one mile in the southeast corner of town.

The town has no rail or air service, though the town used to have rail service on the Hanover branch. The nearest rail service is the Kingston-Route 3 line of the MBTA's commuter rail service, which passes west of town, the closest stations being in Abington, Whitman, and the Greenbush station in Scituate. The nearest regional airport is Marshfield Municipal Airport, and the nearest national and international service can be reached at Logan International Airport in Boston. Seaplanes occasionally land in neighboring Hanson, on Lake Monponsett.
