= Hanover Crossing =

Shopping Mall in Hanover, Massachusetts

Coordinates: 42.1465°N 70.8420°W

- Address: 1775 Washington Street, Hanover, Massachusetts, United States
- Opened: 1971 (mall); 2022 (lifestyle center)
- Closed: January 2020 (mall)
- Manager: PREP Property Group
- Owner: PREP Property Group
- Num. of stores: 30+
- Num. of anchor tenants: 1
- Floor area: 732,101 sq ft (68,014 m^{2})
- Floors: 1
- Website: thehanovercrossing.com

Hanover Crossing (previously the Hanover Mall) is mixed-use development located in Hanover, Massachusetts. It operated from 1971 until 2020 as an indoor shopping mall, and reopened in 2022 after being converted into an outdoor lifestyle center. It is anchored by department store Macy's and grocery store Market Basket. Previous anchors include A.C. Moore, Almy's, Ames, Filene's, JCPenney, Jordan Marsh, Sears, Walmart, Woolworth, and Zayre.

The final conversion will combine open-air retail, entertainment and lifestyle space and residential development.

== History ==
Hanover Mall was built in 1971 and renovated in 1999. Originally the mall anchors were Woolworth, Zayre and Almy's. Sears was later added to the mall. Almy's closed in 1987 and its space was filled by Filene's. Zayre became Ames after the chains merged in 1989. Jordan Marsh closed in 1996 shortly after it became Macy's and was then torn down to become a new wing which housed JCPenney. Filene's was expanded about this time. Old Navy replaced the food court which had not seen enough business to remain. In 2002, Ames closed and the space became Walmart in Fall 2004. In January 2015, it was announced the JCPenney store was closing as part of a plan to close 39 underperforming stores nationwide. After being vacant for nearly two years, the defunct JCPenney store has since been converted into the Hanover Mall Event Center, and is currently the venue for the SouthCoast Comic Con fan convention. On September 5, 2019, it was announced that Sears would also be closing on December 15, 2019. On October 5, 2019, it was announced that Walmart would be closing as well on October 25, 2019, as well as Old Navy, which left Macy's as the only anchor left.

A new outdoor shopping center called Hanover Crossing which opened in 2022, would replace the mall which closed in January 2020 and was torn down in April 2020. As part of the project, a new Market Basket opened in the northern part of the construction area on March 11, 2022.
