= Triumph Over Disaster: The Hurricane Andrew Story =

- Genre: Drama
- Written by: Casey Kelly
- Directed by: Marvin J. Chomsky
- Starring: Ted Wass; Brynn Thayer; John Getz; Veronica Cartwright; Arnetia Walker; Carmen Argenziano; Jill Schoelen; Chris Demetral; Brian McNamara
- Composer: Laurence Rosenthal
- Country of origin: United States
- Original language: English

Production
- Producers: Marvin J. Chomsky; Brian Pike
- Cinematography: Isidore Mankofsky
- Editor: William B. Stich
- Running time: 90 minutes
- Production company: NBC Productions

Original release
- Network: NBC
- Release: May 24, 1993

Triumph Over Disaster: The Hurricane Andrew Story is a 1993 American drama film directed by Marvin J. Chomsky and written by Casey Kelly. The film stars Ted Wass, Brynn Thayer, John Getz, Veronica Cartwright, Arnetia Walker, Carmen Argenziano, Jill Schoelen, Chris Demetral and Brian McNamara. The film premiered on NBC on May 24, 1993.

WTVJ aired a disclaimer read by Bryan Norcross emphasizing the fictional depiction of the station (and Ted Wass’ portrayal of Bryan) prior to airing on its airwaves.

== Cast ==
- Ted Wass as Bryan Norcross
- Brynn Thayer as Sandra Channing
- John Getz as Doug Hulin
- Veronica Cartwright as Carla Hulin
- Arnetia Walker as Paulette Rickles
- Carmen Argenziano as Ed Lopez
- Jill Schoelen as Ruth Henderson
- Chris Demetral as Robin Hulin
- Brian McNamara as Cal Kessler
- Eileen Heckart as Shelley
- Kim Hunter as Elsa Rael
- George Grizzard as Dr. Sheets
- Mark Adair-Rios as Marco Lielli
- Anthony Finazzo as Justin Hulin
- Alexandra Núñez as Carolyn Hulin
- Steve Schneider as Nick Rigley
- Maya Simmonds as Treesha Rickles
- Collette Wilson as Leslie Ames
- Steve Roth as Spence
- Christine Page as Co-Anchor
- Alfredo Álvarez Calderón as Ramon Menendez
- Robin Trapp as Carmen Lopez
- George Ortuzar as Mel
- Nick Ondarza as Emilio
- Anthony Giaimo as Benno
- Kathryn Klvana as Georgia
- Paul Sylvan as Vince Lielli
- John Archie as Samaritan
- Bryan Norcross as Ted
