= Fresh =

Fresh may refer to:

== Arts, entertainment, and media ==
=== Films and television ===
- Fresh (1994 film), a crime film
- Fresh (2009 film), a documentary film on sustainable agriculture
- Fresh (2022 film), a thriller film
- Fresh with the Australian Women's Weekly (or simply Fresh), an Australian cooking show

=== Music ===
==== Groups and labels ====
- Fresh (band), a London-based pop-punk band
- Fresh Records (UK)
- Fresh Records (US)

==== Albums ====
- Fresh (Shawn Desman album)
- Fresh!, Gina G album
- Fresh (Raspberries album)
- Fresh (Sly and the Family Stone album)
- Fresh (Teddybears album)
- Fresh (Melissa Tkautz album)
- Fresh (Lil Baby album)
- Fresh, a 2010 album by Tye Tribbett

==== Songs ====
- "Fresh" (Daft Punk song)
- "Fresh" (Devo song)
- "Fresh!" (Gina G song)
- "Fresh" (Kool & the Gang song), a 1984 song by Kool & The Gang
- "F.R.E.S.H.", a 2007 song by Scribe

=== Radio ===
- Fresh (Coventry & Warwickshire), an English radio station, covering the West Midlands
- Fresh 40, a networked music singles chart show broadcast in the UK
- Fresh 92.7, an Adelaide radio station formerly known as Fresh FM
- FreshAir, an alternative music radio station
- Fresh FM (Netherlands), a Dutch music radio station
- Fresh FM (Nigeria), a radio network in Nigeria
- Fresh FM (New Zealand), a community access station
- Fresh FM (Petroc), a student-led radio station at Petroc in Barnstaple, England
- Fresh Radio (Canada), adult contemporary brand used by several stations in Alberta, Manitoba, and Southern Ontario
- Fresh Radio, a defunct British radio station
- WCFS-FM, a radio station in Elmwood Park, Illinois formerly branded as Fresh FM
- WIAD a radio station in Bethesda, Maryland formerly branded as Fresh FM
- WNEW-FM, a station in New York City formerly branded as Fresh FM

== People ==
- DJ Fresh (born 1977), UK-based drum and bass artist
- DJ Fresh (American DJ), US-based R&B producer born Marqus Brown

== Other uses ==
- Fresh (IDE), an integrated development environment for flat assembler languages
- Fresh (wine), a positive perception of wine acidity

== See also ==
- Fr3sh
- Fresh air (disambiguation)
- Fresh Meadows (disambiguation)
- Fresh Pond (disambiguation)
- Fresh Prince (disambiguation)
- Fresh River (disambiguation)
- Fresh Start (disambiguation)
