= Weymouth Back River Reservation =

State park and reservation in Massachusetts, USA

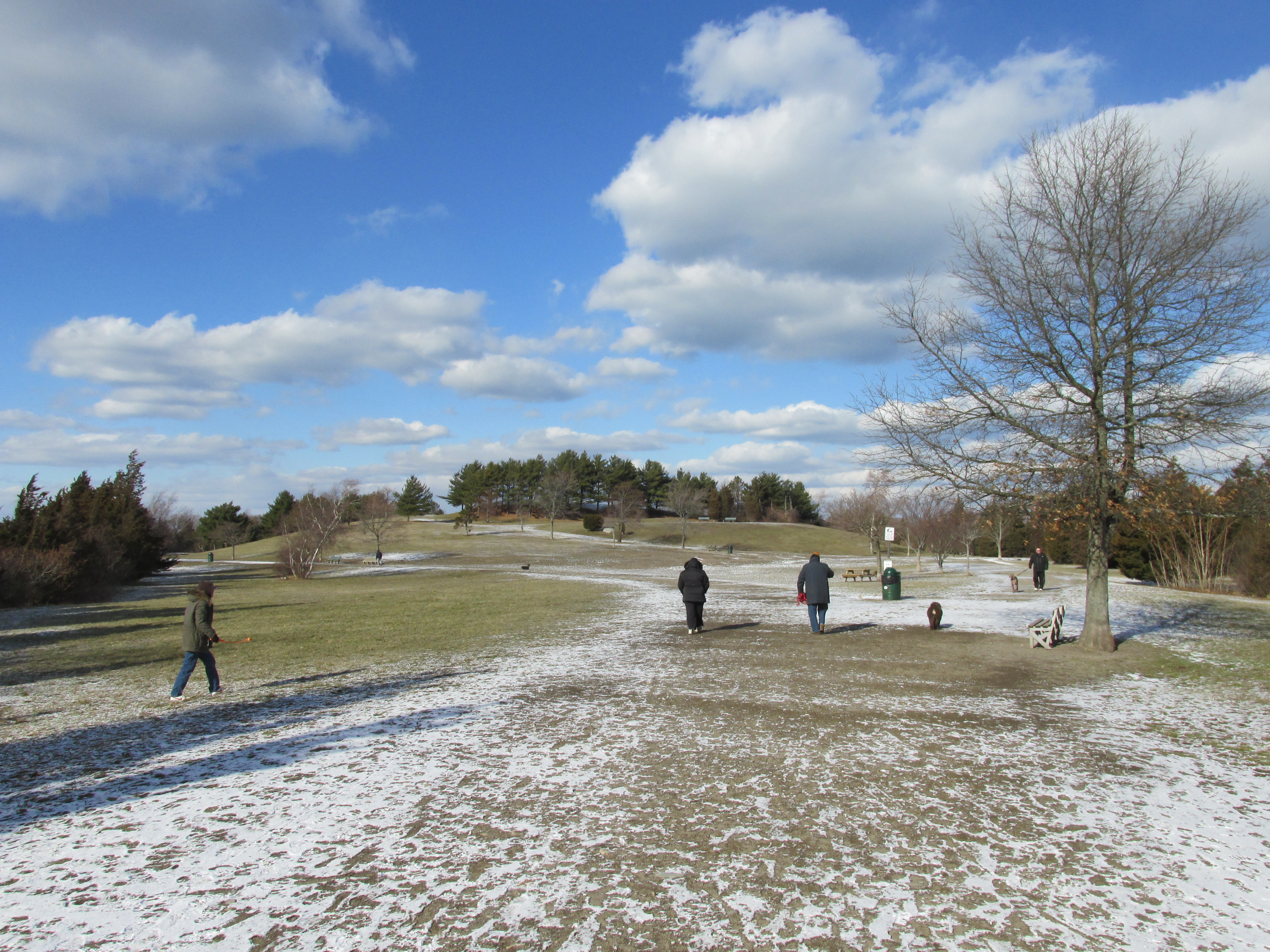
- Stodder's Neck

- Location within Massachusetts Location within the United States
- Location: Hingham and Weymouth, Massachusetts, United States
- Coordinates: 42°14′59″N 70°55′43″W
- Area: 9 acres (3.6 ha)
- Elevation: 16 ft (4.9 m)
- Administrator: Massachusetts Department of Conservation and Recreation
- Website: Official website

Weymouth Back River Reservation is a protected coastal reservation in Hingham and Weymouth, Massachusetts. It contains parks on the west and east sides of the northern end of Weymouth Back River. On the west side in Weymouth, Abigail Adams Park is adjacent to and north of Route 3A Bridge and Great Esker Park is south of the bridge. On the east side in Hingham, Stodder's Neck is north of the bridge and Bare Cove Park is south of the bridge. It features Weymouth Back River views, walking trails and landscaped areas. The reservation is part of the Metropolitan Park System of Greater Boston.
