= USS Zircon =

Patrol vessel of the United States Navy

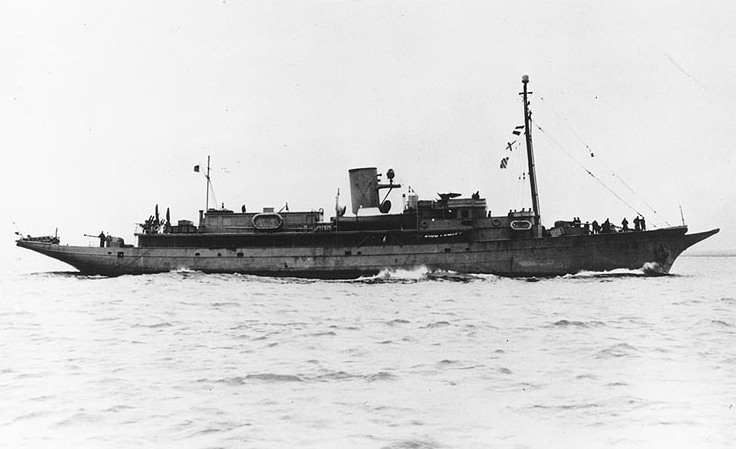
- USS Zircon (PY-16) during World War II

History

United States
- Name: Nakhoda; Zircon; Nakhoda; New York
- Namesake: Nakhuda; Zircon
- Builder: The Pusey and Jones Corporation, Wilmington, Delaware
- Yard number: 405/1040
- Laid down: 12 February 1929
- Launched: 20 August 1929
- Christened: 20 August 1929
- Completed: Delivered 5 February 1930
- Acquired: by Navy 9 December 1940
- Commissioned: 25 March 1941
- Decommissioned: 10 May 1946
- Stricken: 5 June 1946
- Identification: Signal (1931): MHQR; U.S. Official Number 229321
- Fate: Transferred to Maritime Commission for disposal 17 October 1946; sold by War Shipping Administration, 24 April 1947
- Notes: Operated as private yacht Nakhoda, 1929-1940

General characteristics
- Type: yacht
- Tonnage: 958 GRT, 428 Net
- Displacement: 1,220 (estimated)
- Length: 235 ft 4 in (71.73 m) (overall); 206.5 ft (62.9 m) (registry)
- Beam: 34.2 ft 0 in (10.42 m)
- Draft: 13 ft 0 in (3.96 m) mean
- Depth: 16.8 ft 0 in (5.12 m)
- Propulsion: 2 X 1,100 hp diesels
- Speed: 14 knots
- Endurance: 10,000 nmi (12,000 mi; 19,000 km) (minimum)
- Complement: 40 (yacht); 108 (Navy)
- Armament: 2 × 3"/50 gun; 6 × .30 cal (7.62 mm) machine guns; 2 × depth charge throwers

USS Zircon (PY-16) was the private yacht Nakhoda acquired by the United States Navy in 1940 serving as an armed yacht from 1941 to 1946. The yacht Nakhoda was built for automobile executive Frederick J. Fisher by Pusey and Jones Corporation, Wilmington, Delaware delivered in 1930. After the war the yacht was sold and reverted to the original name until sold in 1951 to the United New York Sandy Hook Pilots Association and renamed New York.

== Construction ==
The Nakhoda, U.S. Official Number 229321, was built by the Pusey and Jones Corporation at Wilmington, Delaware. The keel was laid 12 February 1929 as hull number 1040 (sequential number 405) with launch on 20 August 1929 and delivery on 5 February 1930. The owner's wife, Bertha M. Fisher, christened the yacht in a ceremony attended by a group of the Fisher's friends with Detroit and General Motors associations including Alfred P. Sloan and Pierre S. du Pont.

Nakhoda was one of three yachts of identical design developed by joint efforts of the naval architectural firms Cox & Stevens, Incorporated and John H. Wells, Incorporated. (Note: See photo of the yacht in this reference.) The other two Pusey and Jones built yachts of the same design were Rene, hull 406/1041, for Alfred P. Sloan and Cambriona, hull 407/1042, for W. O. Briggs. (Note: Rene was also acquired by the Navy to become Beryl (PY-23).)

The yacht was 235 ft 4 in (71.73 m) overall length, 206.5 ft (62.9 m) (registered length), 34.2 ft 0 in (10.42 m) beam with a depth of 16.8 ft 0 in (5.12 m). As built draft was 12 ft 6 in (3.81 m) with Navy giving mean draft as 13 ft 0 in (3.96 m). Nakhoda had two Winton diesel engines of 1,100 horsepower driving twin screws. The vessel was designed for long cruises with a range of at least 10,000 nmi (12,000 mi; 19,000 km). Electrical power was provided by three generating sets consisting of two 75 kilowatt six cylinder Winton diesels and one six cylinder 30 kilowatt diesel. The yacht was lavishly furnished with a crew of forty. Nakhoda was registered with home port of New York with signal letters MHQR.

== Yacht Nakhoda ==
Nakhoda had an apartment suite for the owner that included two baths and five double staterooms with private baths for guests on the berth deck. The main deck had a large dining room forward with a hallway running through the pantry and galley area to music and living rooms and the owner's lounge and library. Above was a bridge deck with bridge, captain's quarters, radio and navigation rooms forward in a deck house. In an after house were smoking room, gymnasium and club room.

Yacht owners in the Detroit Yacht Club engaged in a competition for the largest yacht during the 1920s with Nakoda finally capping the race for Fisher. In 1933 Bertha M. Fisher, wife of Frederick Fisher, became owner of Nakhoda which in 1940 had signal letters WMDE. The yacht was noted in Miami during the winter season of 1935 along with sister ship Rene.

== Navy acquisition ==
The US Navy acquired Nakhoda from automobile body manufacturer Frederick J. Fisher, of Detroit, Michigan, on 9 December 1940, renamed the ship Zircon (in accordance with Navy policy of naming vessels of this class for gems or semi-precious stones), and designated patrol yacht PY-16. Zircon was outfitted for naval service as an armed yacht at the Brooklyn Navy Yard in Brooklyn, New York, and commissioned on 25 March 1941.

=== Service history ===
Though assigned to New London, Connecticut, as an antiaircraft gunnery school ship specializing in machine-gun training for officer trainees, Zircon also conducted inshore patrols and visited ports from New York City to Casco Bay, Maine. Those duties continued until the autumn of 1941, at which time it began making mail and dispatch runs between Portland, Maine, and Argentia, Newfoundland.

In mid-February 1942, Zircon was reassigned to the Eastern Sea Frontier and initially conducted patrols along the coast of New Jersey. Following extensive repairs in June 1942, the converted yacht reported for duty with the Commander, Caribbean Sea Frontier, under whose auspices it escorted convoys between Guantánamo Bay, Cuba, and New York City. It steamed back and forth between Cuba and New York City – occasionally calling at some of the islands of the West Indies, notably Trinidad and San Salvador Island – until 1 March 1944. At that juncture, it received a temporary assignment to the United States Coast Guard's weather patrol.

Between March and November 1944, Zircon operated out of Boston, Massachusetts, and plied the waters of the North Atlantic with the weather patrol. However, it continued to participate to some extent in the protection of New York City-Guantanamo Bay convoys and of other mercantile traffic along the North American coast.

On 8 April 1942, Zircon picked up sixteen survivors (twelve crew members, one apprentice seaman, and three passengers) of the merchant ship, Otho, which had been torpedoed by the German U-Boat U-754 five days earlier approximately two hundred miles east of Cape Henry, Virginia (36°25′N 72°22′W), and transported them to Cape May.

On 11 May 1944, Zircon responded to sightings of flames and explosions approximately fourteen miles outside Boston Harbor and immediately navigated toward the YF-415, (Note: YF-415 was a yard craft, a lighter, and never commissioned. "U.S.S." application is therefore incorrect.) which had been disposing of condemned ammunition from the Hingham Naval Ammunition Depot when the fire and explosions occurred. Zircon crew members John Bell Power, Paul Magera, and Henry John O'Toole, in a twenty-foot running boat, rescued fourteen of the YF-415's thirty crew members from the cold waters, as shrapnel was still flying. One of the rescued sailors died the following day from severe burns. Soundman Third Class John Bell Power received the Navy and Marine Corps Medal for skillfully maneuvering the rescue boat to rescue the surviving crew members.

On 16 November 1944, Zircon reported for duty with the Commander, DD-DE (i.e., destroyer-destroyer escort) Shakedown Task Group. That duty lasted until 7 December 1944, when it was designated relief flagship for the Commander in Chief, U.S. Atlantic Fleet, based at Philadelphia, Pennsylvania. It served in that capacity through the end of World War II.

In September 1946, Zircon received orders to report to the Commandant, 6th Naval District at Charleston, South Carolina, to prepare for decommissioning and disposal. On 10 May 1946, Zircon was decommissioned at Charleston. Its name was struck from the Navy List on 5 June 1946, and the ship was turned over to the Maritime Commission for disposal on 17 October 1946. It was sold by the War Shipping Administration on 24 April 1947.

== Post Navy ==
The vessel reverted to the original name Nakhoda on sale. The United New York Sandy Hook Pilots Association of Staten Island, New York acquired the vessel in 1951 giving the name New York. In 1973 New York, formerly Nakhoda, was sold to the Polymer Engineering Corp. of Houston, Texas after replacement by a new vessel bearing the name New York.
