= Fresh Start =

Fresh Start may refer to:

- Fresh Start (album), a 2016 album by Ryan Stevenson
- Fresh Start (comics), 2018 relaunch of Marvel Comics
- Fresh Start (detergent), the first powdered detergent to come in a plastic bottle
- Fresh Start (politics), a 1990s grouping of eurosceptics
- Fresh Start (TV series), an Australian television series
- Fresh Start Project, a moderate eurosceptic pressure group founded in 2011
- Fresh Start programme, an educational programme in the United Kingdom
- A Fresh Start, a 1910 American silent short drama
- "A Fresh Start" (Doctors), a 2003 television episode
- "A Fresh Start" (Oban Star-Racers), a 2006 television episode
- Bankruptcy discharge
