= USS YF-415 =

A covered lighter in service with the United States Navy during World War II

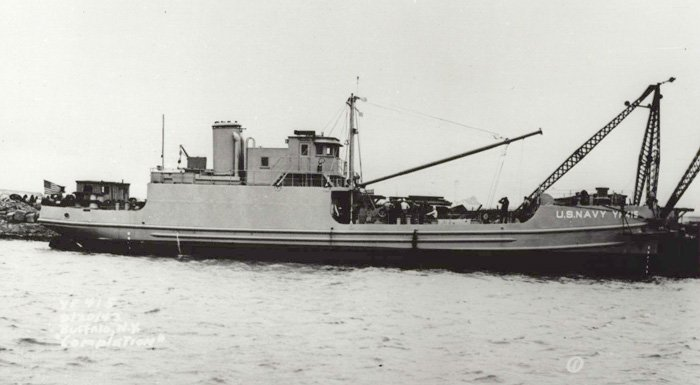

History

United States
- Name: YF-415
- Builder: American Shipbuilding Company, Buffalo, New York
- In service: 30 September 1943
- Out of service: 11 May 1944
- Stricken: 16 May 1944
- Homeport: Boston, Massachusetts
- Fate: Sunk following explosion of munitions; 42°24′N 70°36′W; Wreck discovered in 2002

General characteristics
- Class & type: Self-propelled covered lighter
- Length: 132 ft (40 m)
- Beam: 32 ft (9.8 m)
- Draft: 12 ft (3.7 m)
- Propulsion: Twin 300 hp Union diesel engines; Twin screws
- Complement: 17

YF-415 was a self-propelled covered lighter in service with the United States Navy during World War II. It was accidentally sunk on May 11, 1944, while disposing of surplus explosive ordnance approximately 14 miles (23 km) northeast of Boston Harbor.

== Early career ==
YF-415 was built at the American Shipbuilding Company in Buffalo, New York. She was completed and placed in service in September 1943. She was 132 feet (40 m) long and could carry cargo up to 250 tons. She operated in and around Boston, Massachusetts.

== Loss ==
On May 10, 1944, YF-415 sailed to the Hingham Naval Ammunition Depot in Hingham, Massachusetts, a few miles south of Boston on the south shore of Cape Cod Bay. She was commanded by Chief Boatswain's Mate Louis Brunswick Tremblay. Her mission was to pick up surplus ordnance and dispose of it in deep water. She was loaded with 150 tons of five-inch (13 cm) and three-inch (7.6 cm) projectiles and other ordnance. There were 30 sailors on board—14 of her regular crew and 16 African-American sailors from the naval ammunition depot to assist in the disposal of the munitions.

At 11:30 a.m. on May 11, the crew began to dispose of the ordnance about 14 miles (23 km) northeast of Boston Harbor. About two-thirds of the ordnance was disposed without incident. The next group of munitions were rockets; safety regulations required that the matches attached to the rockets be removed first, in order to ensure they would not be accidentally ignited. Apparently, the crew of YF-415 was not briefed on this procedure.

At 12:30 p.m., there was an explosion, caused by one of the rockets detonating, which engulfed the port side of the ship in flames which began to spread throughout the vessel. The sailors on board YF-415 quickly abandoned ship and clung to floating debris. A total of 14 men, one of whom later died of his injuries, were rescued by the patrol yacht USS Zircon, with 16 being lost with YF-415.

The loss of YF-415, although not named as such, was front-page news in The Boston Globe on May 12. The Globe published a list of personnel, both lost and rescued, the following day.

== Later events ==
An investigation of the incident yielded a report dated June 8, 1944, which called for improved safety protocols, including having similar missions conducted by a towed barge and making life preservers more readily accessible.

The wreck of what turned out to be YF-415 was discovered on November 3, 2002, visited by divers on July 20, 2003, and identified shortly thereafter. It lies at a depth of approximately 240 feet (73 m).

On May 12, 2012, a ceremony was held in Hingham honoring the sailors who died on YF-415. There is a memorial stone and flagpole located in Bare Cove Park in Hingham memorializing the crew.

== See also ==
- List of disasters in Massachusetts by death toll
