= Freshness =

Freshness may refer to:

- Post harvest freshness
- Freshness (album), a 1995 album by Casiopea
- Freshness (cryptography), certainty that replayed messages in a replay attack on a protocol will be detected as such

== See also ==
- Fresh (disambiguation)
