= Fresh Start Project =

UK political pressure group

The Fresh Start Project or Fresh Start Group, also known as EU Fresh Start, is a moderate eurosceptic pressure group formed in the UK to examine the options for a new UK-EU relationship. It should not be confused with a previous group, also called Fresh Start, of anti-European MPs during the premiership of John Major in the 1990s.

== Foundation and aims ==
The Fresh Start Project was formed In September 2011 by three UK Conservative MPs, Andrea Leadsom, Chris Heaton-Harris and George Eustice. Its expressed aims are to examine the options for a new UK-EU relationship, set out what this new relationship could look like, establish a process for achieving change and build political support to make it happen.

== Research papers ==
On 10 July 2012 the Fresh Start Group released a research paper, "Options for Change", which according to the Financial Times, called for “reducing the overall size of the EU budget, overhauling the Common Agricultural Policy to which the UK contributes about £1bn a year and repatriating structural funds.” It was accompanied by "Manifesto for Change" based on the research paper, calling for five significant revisions to the EU Treaties:

1. An "emergency brake" for any Member State regarding future EU legislation that affects financial services.
2. The EU should repatriate competence in the area of social and employment law to Member States. Failing that, an opt-out for the UK from existing EU social and employment law, and an "emergency brake" for any Member State regarding future EU legislation that affects this area.
3. An opt-out for the UK from all existing EU policing and criminal justice measures not already covered by the Lisbon Treaty block opt-out.
4. A new legal safeguard for the single market to ensure that there is no discrimination against non-Eurozone member interests.
5. The abolition of the Strasbourg seat of the European Parliament, the Economic and Social Committee, and the Committee of the Regions.

It also called for reforms within the scope of the existing Treaties. Both documents contained forewords by William Hague, then UK Foreign Secretary.

Other research papers produced by the Fresh Start Project include papers on the impact of the EU on microbusinesses, on the effect of the Working Time Directive on the National Health Service and on the cross-border market in services.

== Pan-European Conference for EU Reform ==
The Fresh Start Project and the think tank Open Europe co-hosted the Pan-European Conference for EU Reform in January 2014. The two-day event brought together 300 delegates from over 30 countries, including eight Ministers, a European Commissioner, former heads of state, politicians and business-leaders. The conference was opened by the UK's Chancellor of the Exchequer George Osborne delivering his first set-piece speech on Europe as Chancellor, and marking the first major speech on Europe by a senior UK Conservative minister since David Cameron's 'Bloomberg' speech in January 2013.

Additional speakers included Maria Damanaki the European Commissioner for Fisheries and Maritime Affairs; Paschal Donohoe, Irish Minister for European Affairs; Rachida Dati, a Member of the European Parliament, the Mayor of the 7th arrondissement of Paris and Deputy President of the French Union for a Popular Movement (UMP) Party; Frits Bolkestein, Former European Commissioner for Internal Market and Services; Peter Norman, Swedish Minister for Financial Markets; and Klaus-Peter Willsch, a German CDU Politician and member of the Bundestag.

Dr Imke Henkel of German weekly Focus labelled the conference "potentially historic" by "leading towards a constructive British Europe policy, which provides the important impetus towards the necessary reforms of the European Community”. Writing in the Sunday Telegraph, Iain Martin called it a “a hugely uplifting gathering”, which “would simply not have taken place before the euro crisis almost brought about the collapse of the single currency”.

== Membership and politics ==
The Fresh Start Group had 100 members among Conservative MPs in January 2014. It is regarded as being on the moderate wing of Conservative euroscepticism, and criticised the 95 Conservative MPs who signed a letter attacking David Cameron's European policies. Andrea Leadsom, leader of the Fresh Start Group, had to step down from it when she became a Treasury minister in April 2014.
