= Fresh Meadows (disambiguation) =

Fresh Meadows may refer to:

- Fresh Meadows, Queens
- Fresh Meadow Country Club, a country club with a golf course Lake Success, New York, located in Queens until 1946
- Fresh Meadows, Kentucky
