= Fresh River =

Fresh River may refer to one of several rivers in the United States:

- Fresh River (Massachusetts), a tributary of the Weymouth Back River
- Fresh River (New Hampshire), a tributary of the Piscassic River
- "Fresh River", a historic name for the Connecticut River
