= Hingham Naval Ammunition Depot Annex =

- Part of United States Navy
- Hingham, Massachusetts

Site information
- Type: Ammunition Depot Annex
- Controlled by: Navy
- Open to the public: Yes

Location
- Coordinates: 42°12′22.95″N 70°50′49.82″W

Site history
- In use: 1941-1962

The Hingham Naval Ammunition Depot Annex, sometimes called the "Cohasset Annex" or "Hingham Annex" by local residents, covered sections of the towns of Hingham, Cohasset, Norwell, and Scituate Massachusetts. It served as an annex to the Hingham Naval Ammunition Depot.

== History ==
=== Beginnings ===
The land for the Annex was bought by the U.S. Navy in 1941, from local landowners, to expand the nearby Hingham Naval Ammunition Depot, in Hingham. The Depot was the main ammunition supplier for Naval Forces of the U.S. Atlantic Fleet, during World War II, employing 2,091 civilians along with 721 naval officers and sailors and 375 Marine guards at its peak in June, 1945. A rail spur, sided off the Old Colony Greenbush Line, was built to facilitate the transfer of ammunition, stored in cement bunkers at the Annex, to the Depot at the Hingham Shipyard.

=== Reactivation ===
Reverted to maintenance status after the War, the Annex was reactivated for the Korean War, during which time it held some of the Navy's first experimental nuclear depth charges, in bunker N9. Depth charges, bombs, and rocket motors were assembled at the Annex until declared surplus, by the Navy, in 1962.

=== Post-Closure Usage ===
The Commonwealth of Massachusetts took possession of the Annex, in 1966, and later turned the 3,500 acres (14 km^{2}) into the present day Wompatuck State Park. The last military activity at the Annex took place when the U.S. Army Reserve 187th Infantry Brigade was stationed at United States Army Reserve Center Hingham from 1971 to 1982.

In the late 1990s the government, who were in charge of the remaining section of the Depot that was not turned into Wompatuck, announced they were going to donate the remaining part to the park. This involved, first, cleaning the area, featuring the demolition of the remaining buildings, despite their historical value. This task was completed in the Spring of 2015, with the former building sites having been razed and covered with earth and new hiking and biking trails established, roadways refinished as walking and biking trails and access improved via the former rail bed, connecting to Route 3A in Cohasset near the Greenbush rail line. Gates have been created at the end of Leavitt St. in Hingham and from the Doane St. path from Cohasset.

Bunkers here, as well as those in the remains of the original Hingham Naval Ammunition Depot in what is now Bare Cove Park, had been used as shelter by homeless persons. Following the grisly murder of two homeless men in Bare Cove in 2005, most of the remaining bunkers in the park were demolished. However, local Boy Scouts have worked to preserve some of these bunkers, including N9, as a memorial to the military and civilian personnel who served at the Depot.

== Images ==
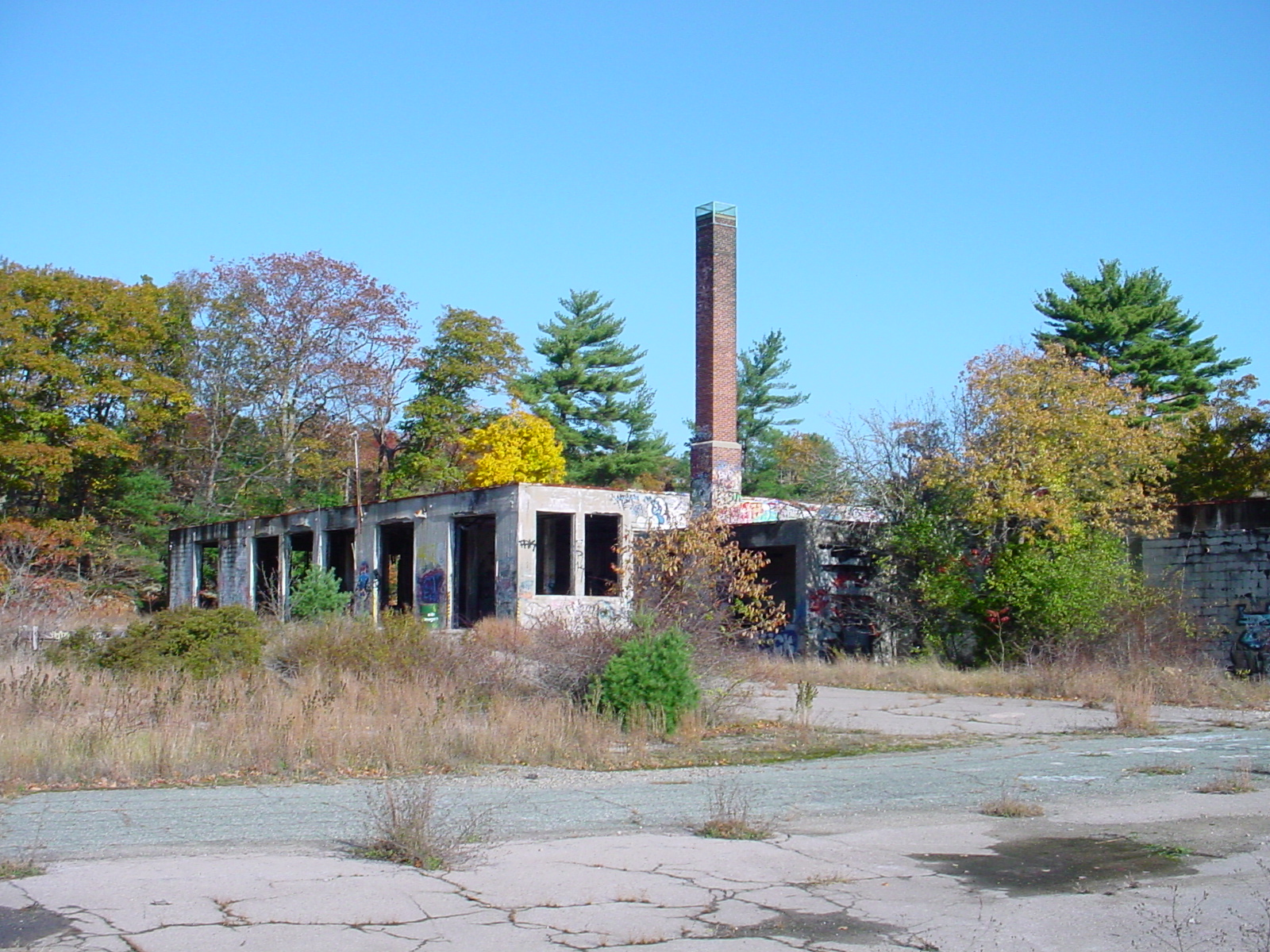
Cohasset Annex Power Plant.

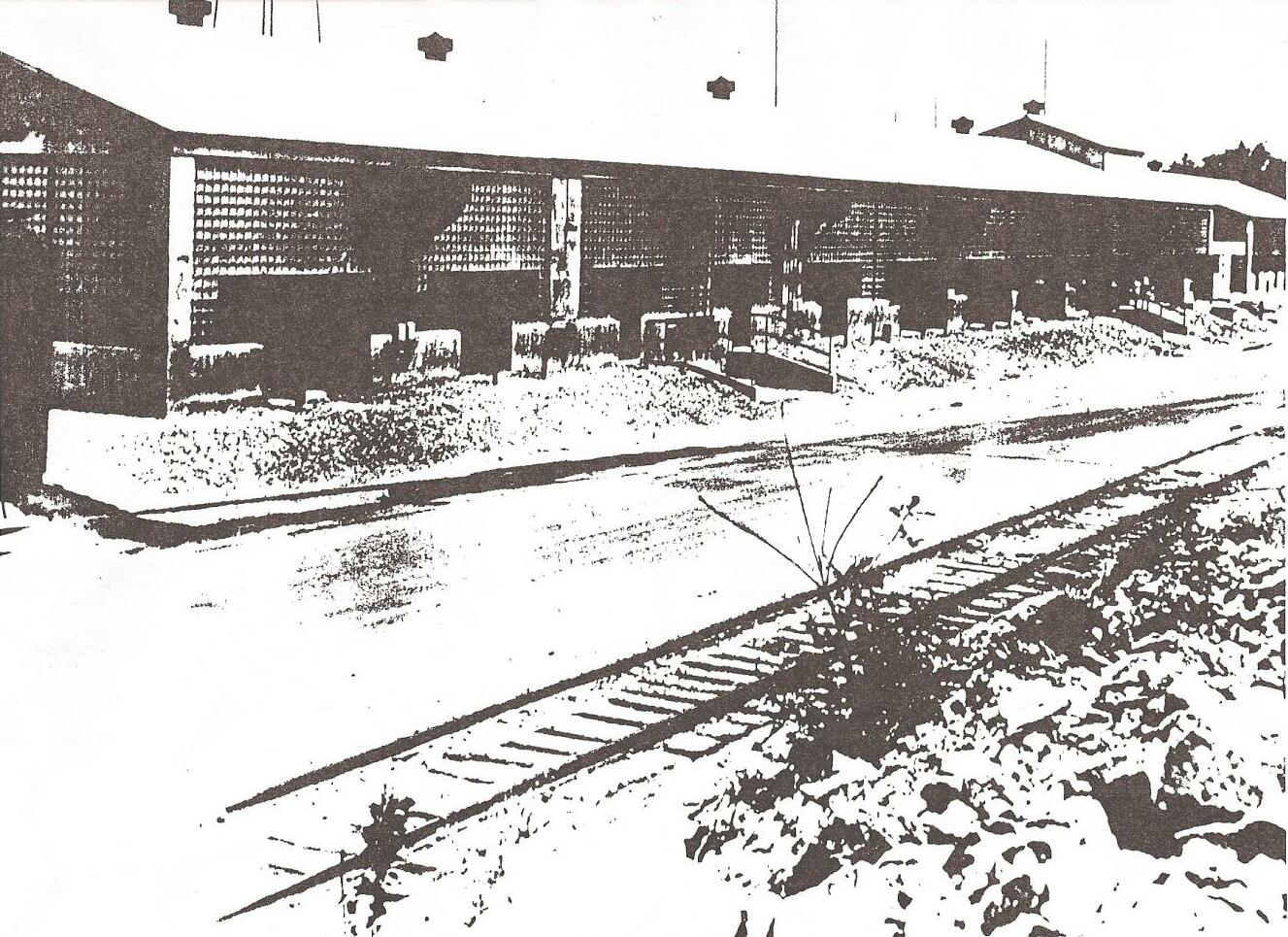
The Ballistite Grain Inhibiting Building during its use.

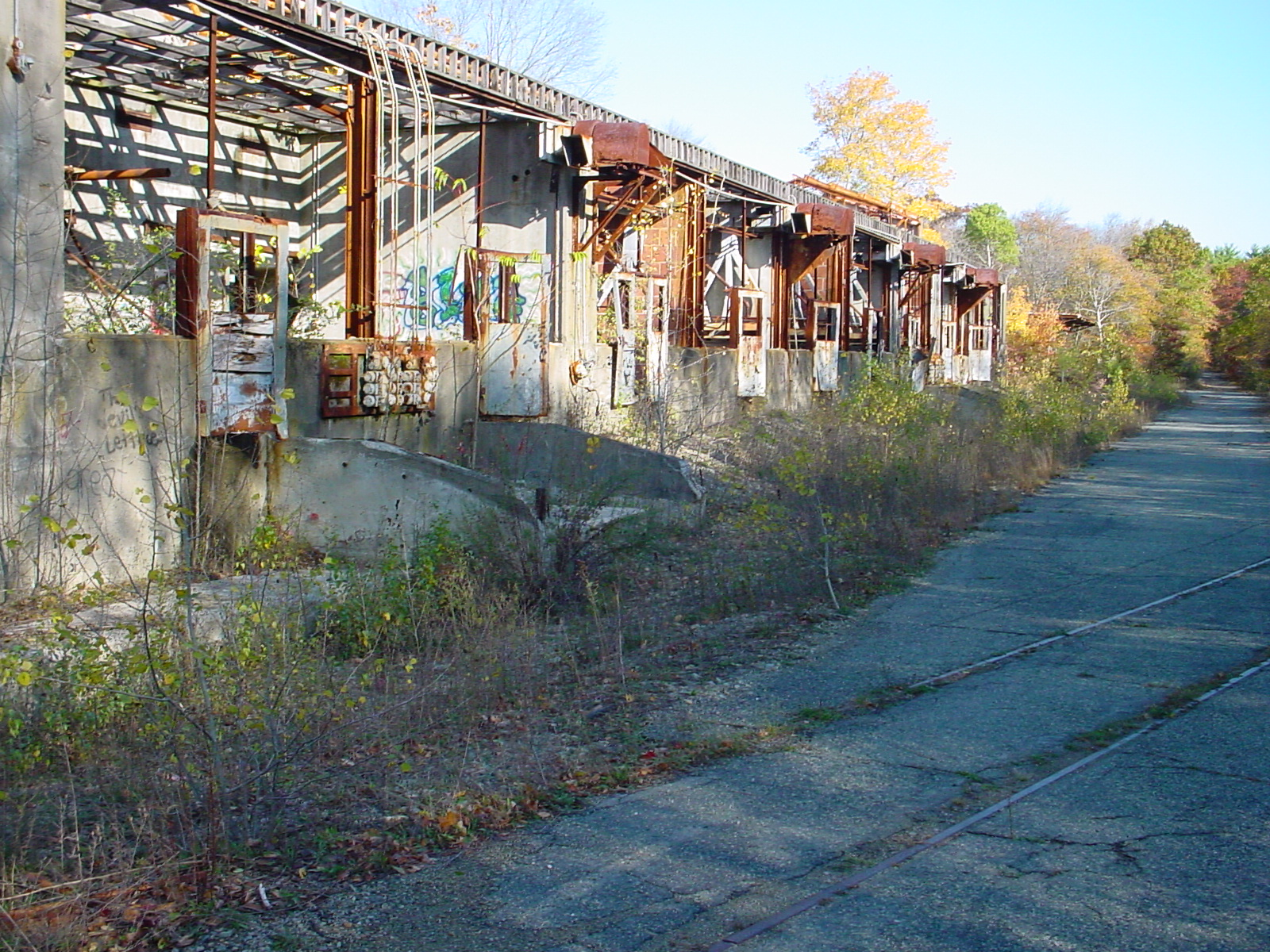
The Ballistite Grain Inhibiting Building today.

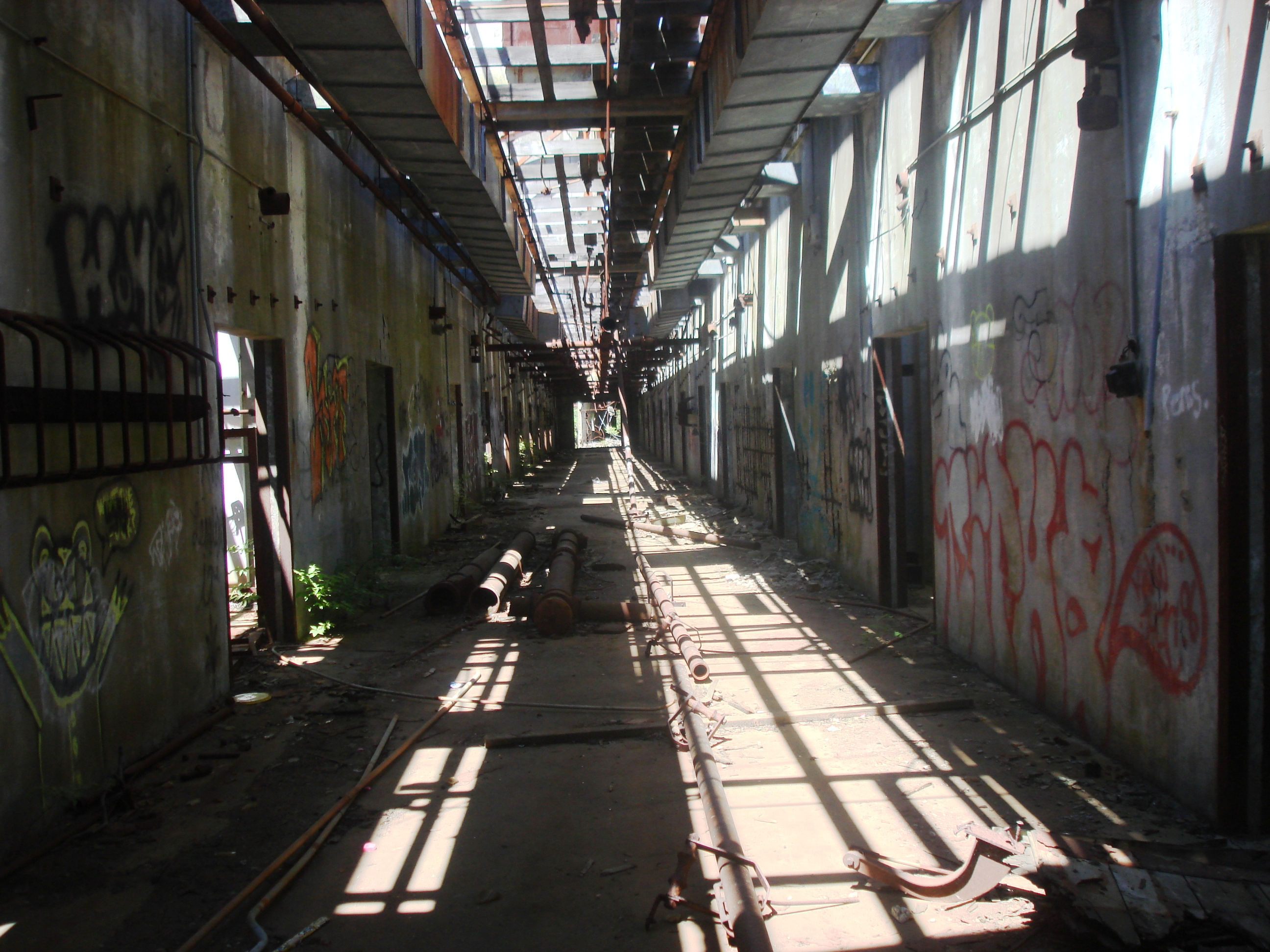
The Ballistite Grain Inhibiting Building's main hallway today.

== See also ==
- List of military installations in Massachusetts
