= Fresh Pond, Sint Maarten =

Pond on Sint Maarten in the Dutch Caribbean

Coordinates: 18°01′56″N 63°03′32″W

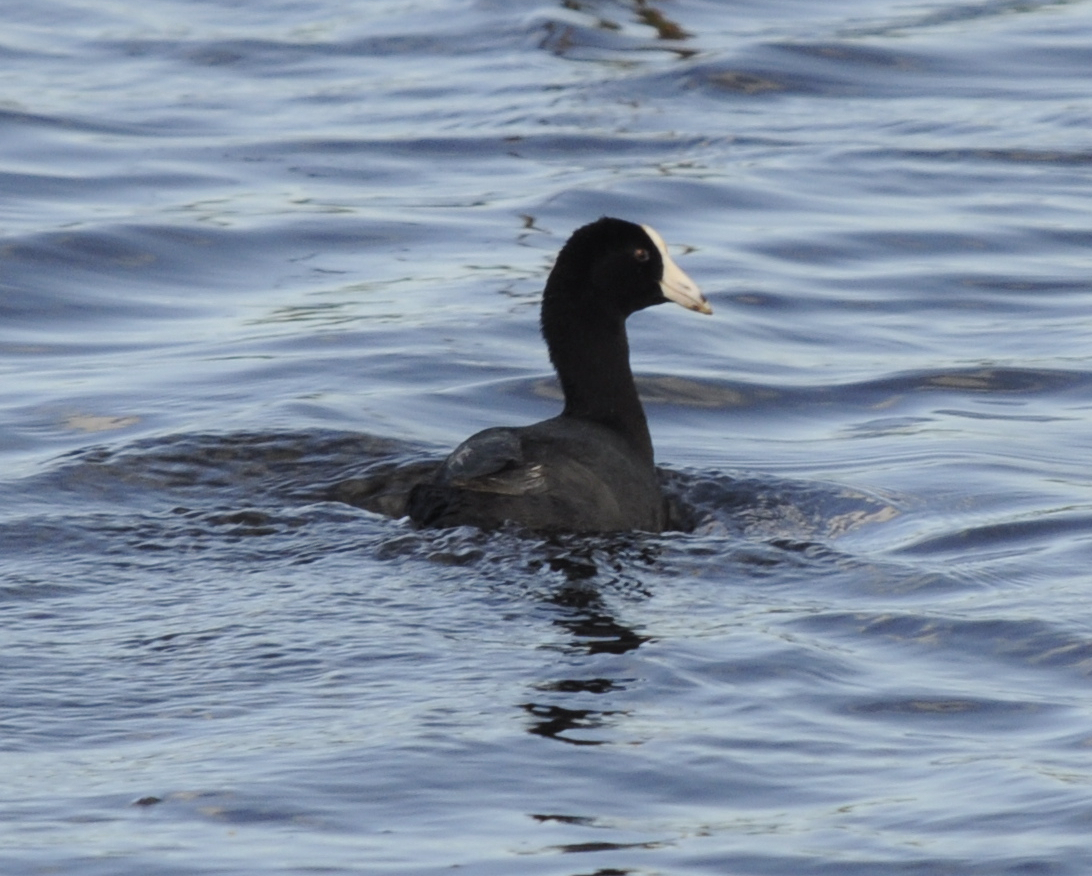
American coots breed in the IBA

Fresh Pond is a 14 ha water body in Sint Maarten on the island of Saint Martin. It has been identified as an Important Bird Area by BirdLife International because it supports populations of various threatened or restricted-range bird species. Some 2.5 km long by 1 km across, it lies within the capital city of Philipsburg. Because of its low salinity (2-3 parts per thousand), it supports species which are less common in other parts of the island. The pond is bordered with reeds, mangroves and coconut palms.

== Description ==
Fresh Pond is an oval-shaped pond located in Philipsburg, the capital of the Dutch island country of Sint Maarten. Sint Maarten occupies half of the Caribbean island of Saint Martin in the Lesser Antilles. The pond is around 2.5 km long and 1 km wide and is located on the southern shore of the island, with a surface area of around 13.5 hectares. The pond is bisected by the Bernhard Bridge, a busy urban bridge that cuts east-west across the pond. There is a hiking trail around the pond leading to Little Bay. The pond is further surrounded by roads and urban development, with only the mangroves on its shore providing a buffer between these and the pond itself. Runoff from the pond's catchment basin tends to have significant levels of sediment, leading to the pond becoming heavily filled-in over the course of several decades. During the 2000s, the pond was dredged to provide a location for water from the Great Salt Pond to flow into when heavy rains flooded it. The sediment dredged out of the pond was used to make two artificial islands at the both ends. These islands have mangroves and coconuts growing on them and provide a nesting site for resident waterbirds. Vegetation along the rest of the pond's shore consists of patches of mangroves and grasses.

The Fresh Pond is adjacent to the Great Salt Pond; a dam separating the two was built in 1792. During the 18th century, the Fresh Pond was largely used as a source of freshwater to be channeled into the sea for the purposes of salt harvesting. To that end, a channel from the pond to the ocean was built in 1850, but the channel is no longer functional and there is no connection between the pond and the sea. There is a small extension pond known as Fresh Pond South at the southern tip of Fresh Pond. It is a deep brackish pond with a fountain at its center and overflows into the nearby bay if there is heavy rainfall.

Fresh Pond is one of only four ponds remaining on Sint Maarten, down from 19 a century ago. The lake is under heavy pressure from high levels of plastic pollution, eutrophication, and invasive species such as tilapia. Both locals and companies dealing with septic waste often dump sewage directly into the lake, leading to high levels of phosphates and low oxygen levels. Although the low salinity of Fresh Pond allows it to harbour species not otherwise seen on Sint Maarten, the lack of water exchange with the sea also contributes to the poor water quality in the pond.

It was recognised as an Important Bird Area by BirdLife International in 2007.

== Fauna ==
American coots have been recorded breeding at the site, as well as snowy egrets, pied-billed grebes, common moorhens, great egrets, white-cheeked pintails and ruddy ducks. Other birds for which the IBA was designated include green-throated caribs, Antillean crested hummingbirds, Caribbean elaenias, pearly-eyed thrashers and lesser Antillean bullfinches.
