= Fresh Pond =

Fresh Pond may refer to:

USA

- Fresh Pond, California, an unincorporated town
- Fresh Pond (Cambridge, Massachusetts), a reservoir and park
  - Fresh Pond Hotel
  - Fresh Pond Parkway
- Fresh Pond (Plymouth, Massachusetts), a pond
- Fresh Ponds, New Jersey, an unincorporated community
- Fresh Pond, Queens, New York, a neighborhood
  - The Fresh Pond Bus Depot

Sint Maarten

- Fresh Pond, Sint Maarten
