= Fresh air =

Fresh air may refer to:

== Arts, entertainment, and media ==
- Fresh Air (film), a 1999 Australian film
- Fresh Air (Homeshake album), 2017
- Fresh Air (Faust album), 2017
- "Fresh Air" (song), by Quicksilver Messenger Service, 1970
- “Fresh Air”, a song by Zayn from his 2018 album Icarus Falls
- Fresh Air, an American radio talk show broadcast on National Public Radio
- FreshAir.org.uk, a student-run radio station serving Edinburgh, Scotland

== Enterprises and organizations ==
- Fresh Air (airline), a defunct Nigerian cargo airline
- The Fresh Air Fund, a charity that provides summer vacations to New York City children from low-income communities

== See also ==
- Fresh Aire, an album by Mannheim Steamroller
