= Fresh Meadows, Kentucky =

Unincorporated community in Kentucky, United States

- Unincorporated community
- Location within Kentucky Location within the United States
- Coordinates: 36°50′35″N 83°22′25″W
- Country: United States
- State: Kentucky
- County: Harlan
- Elevation: 1,191 ft (363 m)
- Time zone: UTC-5 (Eastern (EST))
  - Summer (DST): UTC-4 (EDT)
- GNIS feature ID: 492527

Fresh Meadows is an unincorporated community in Harlan County, Kentucky, United States.
