= Great Esker Park =

Park in Weymouth, Massachusetts

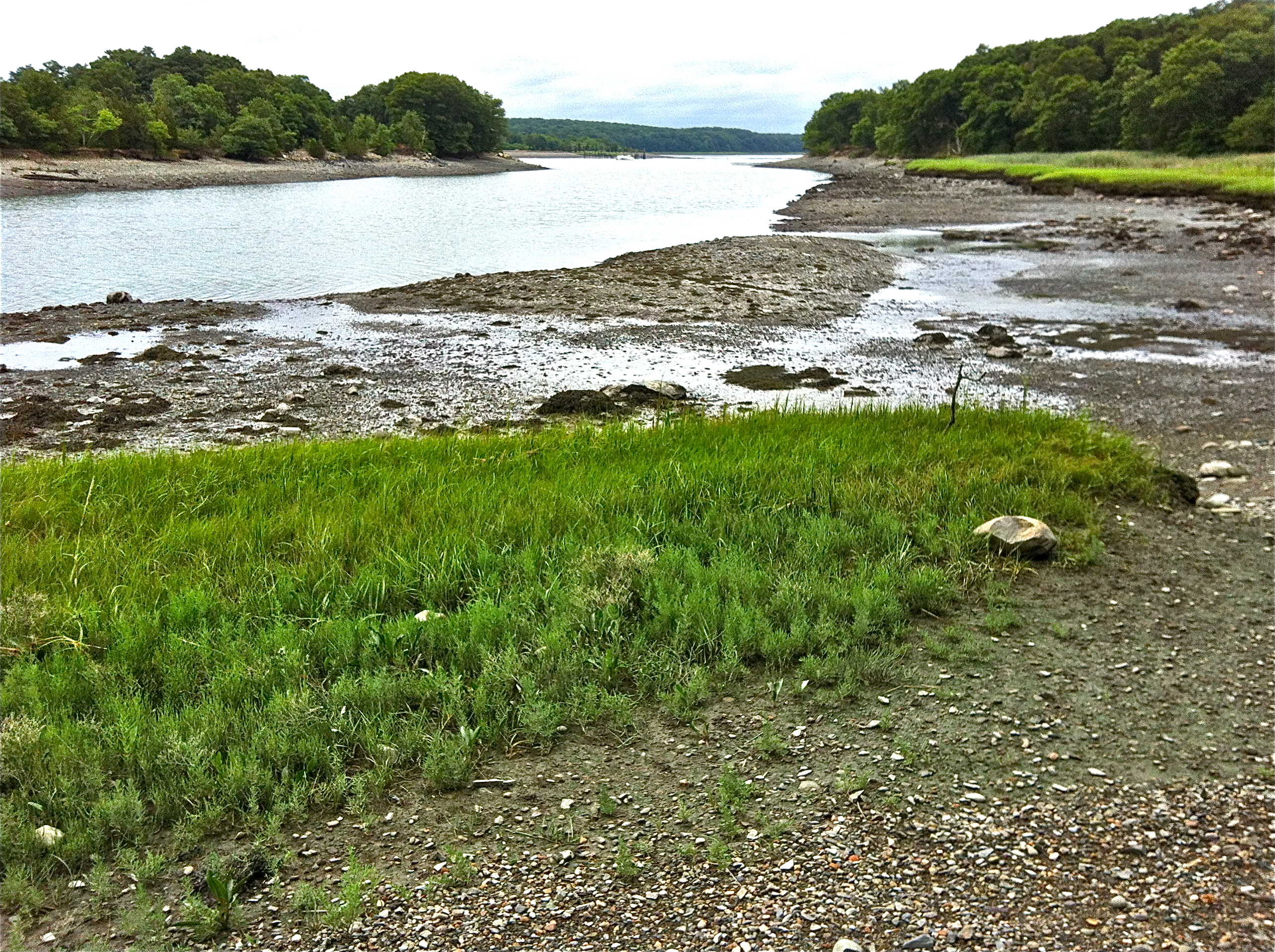
- Looking up the Weymouth Back River from Great Esker Park, the esker is the tree-covered, long, ridge on the right rising 90 feet above sea level in various locations.
- Interactive map of Great Esker Park
- Type: Urban park
- Location: Weymouth, Massachusetts
- Coordinates: 42°14′12″N 70°55′47″W
- Area: 237 acres (96 ha)

Great Esker Park is located in Weymouth, Massachusetts. The park mostly consists of a geological formation known as a winding ridge of stratified sand and gravel formed by a glacier 12,000 years ago. It is located along the Weymouth Back River, across from Bare Cove Park in Hingham, Massachusetts.

The park features one of the highest eskers in North America (90 ft), reversing falls, salt marshes, six miles (10 km) of trails, a playground and picnic area. Bird watching is a popular activity as osprey, great blue heron, red-tailed hawks, owls, and other species of birds are abundant seasonally. There are man-made shelters on the river where Osprey nest in the spring and summer months.

In the summer months the park is used by Wey-Rec for children's programs.

== Image gallery ==
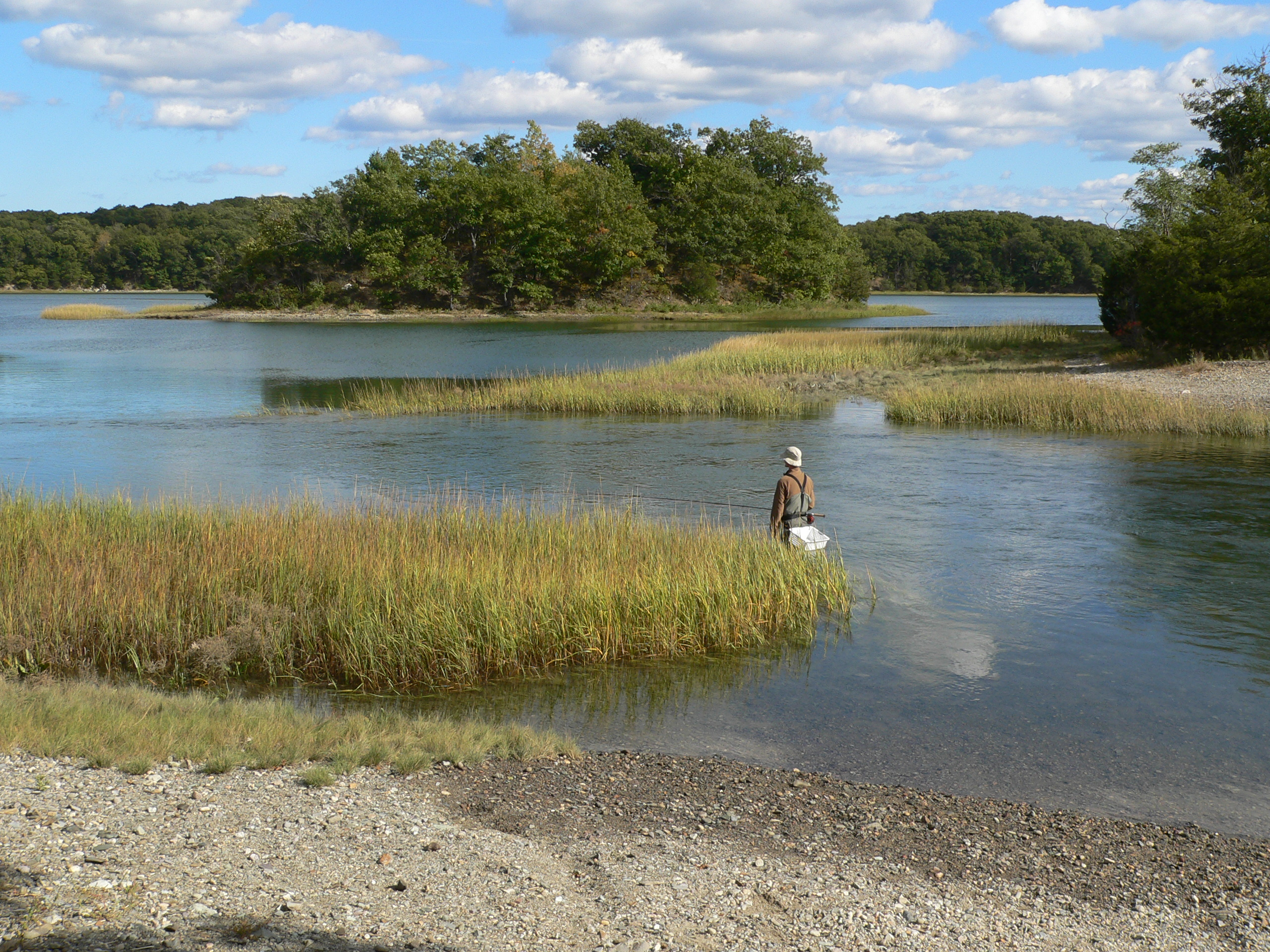
Fishing in Back River

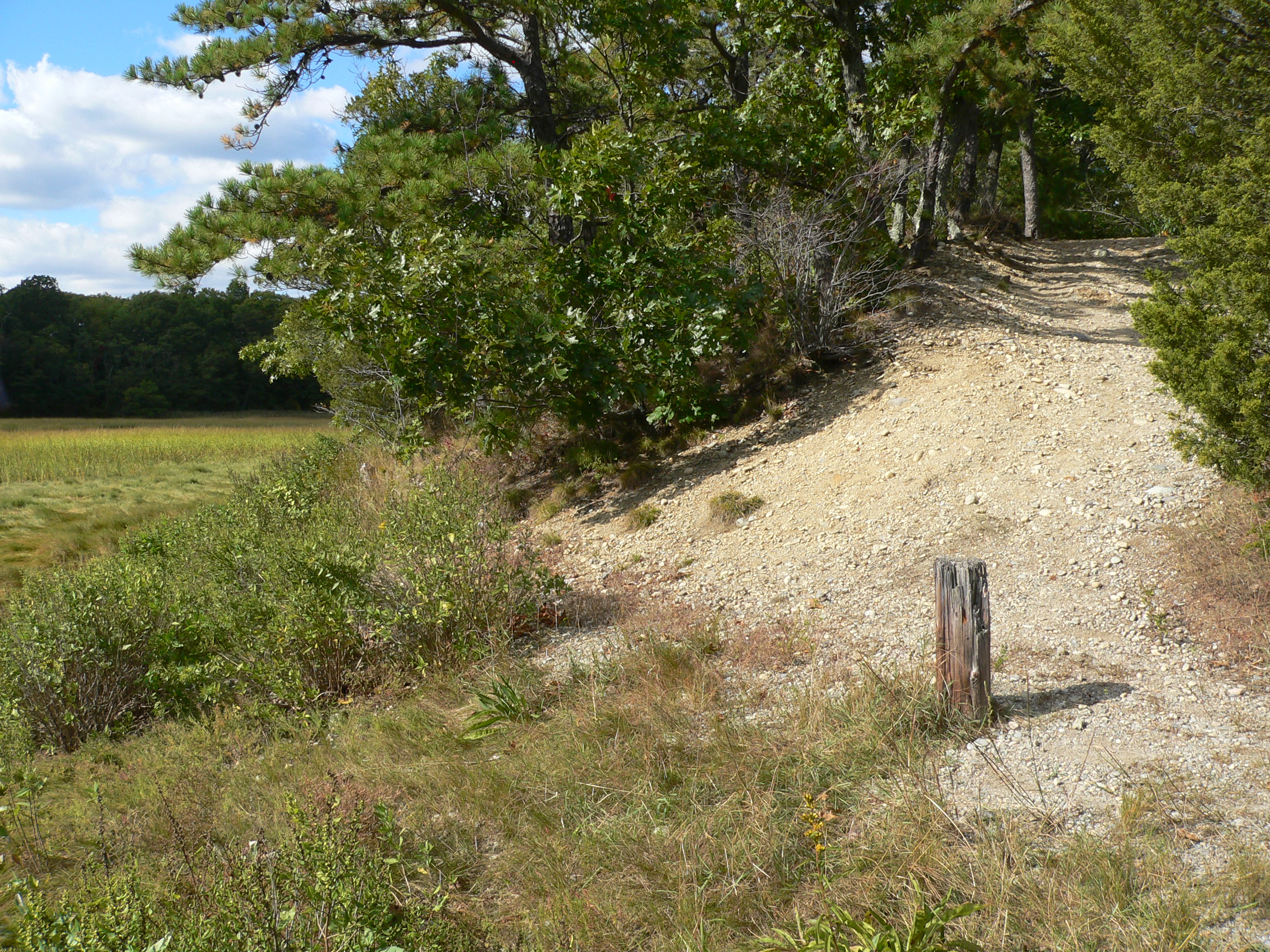
Trail climbs the esker

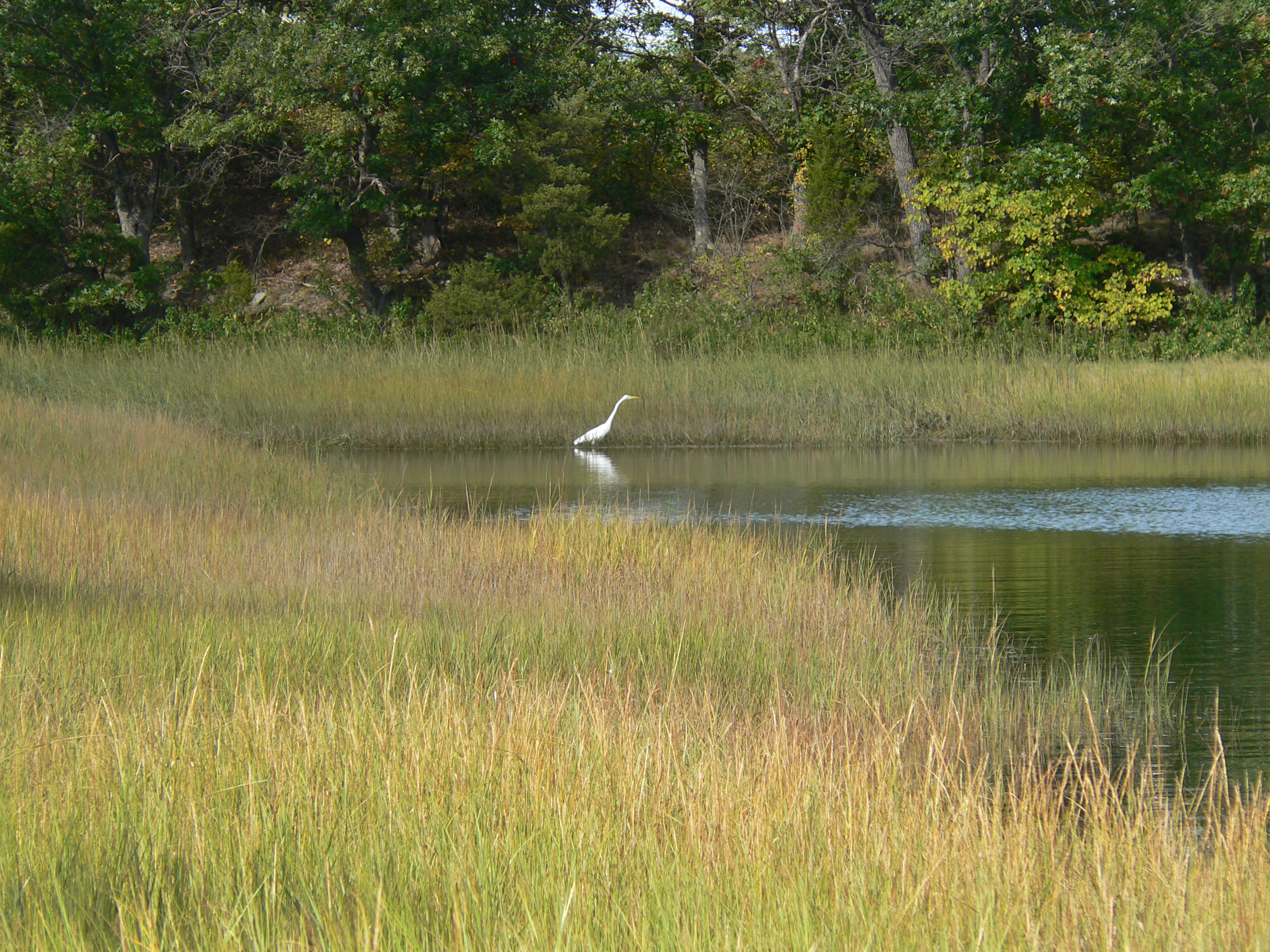
Egret

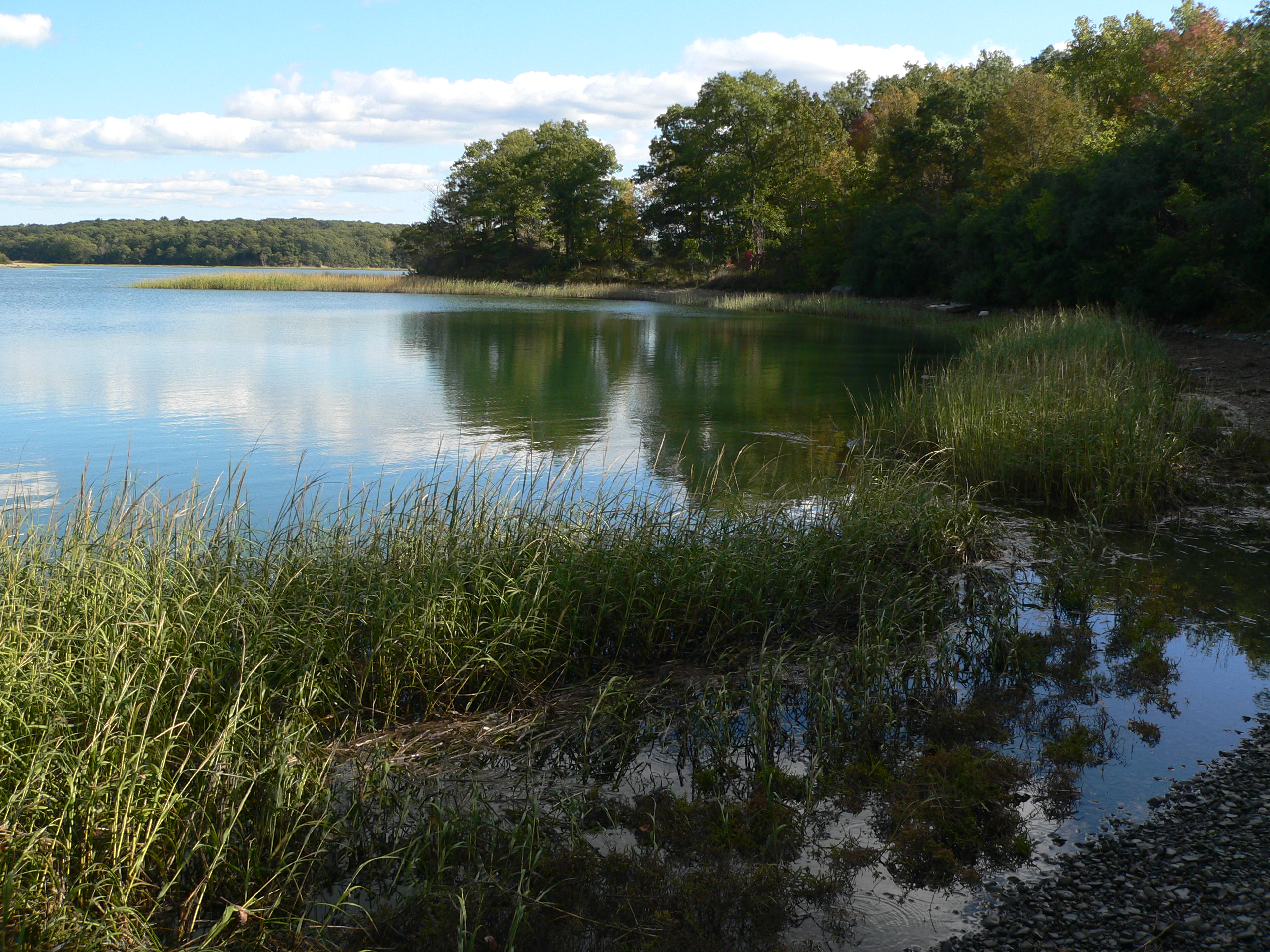
Back River

== See also ==
- Weymouth Back River
