= Bare Cove Park =

Park in Hingham, Massachusetts, United States

Coordinates: 42.236°N 70.916°W

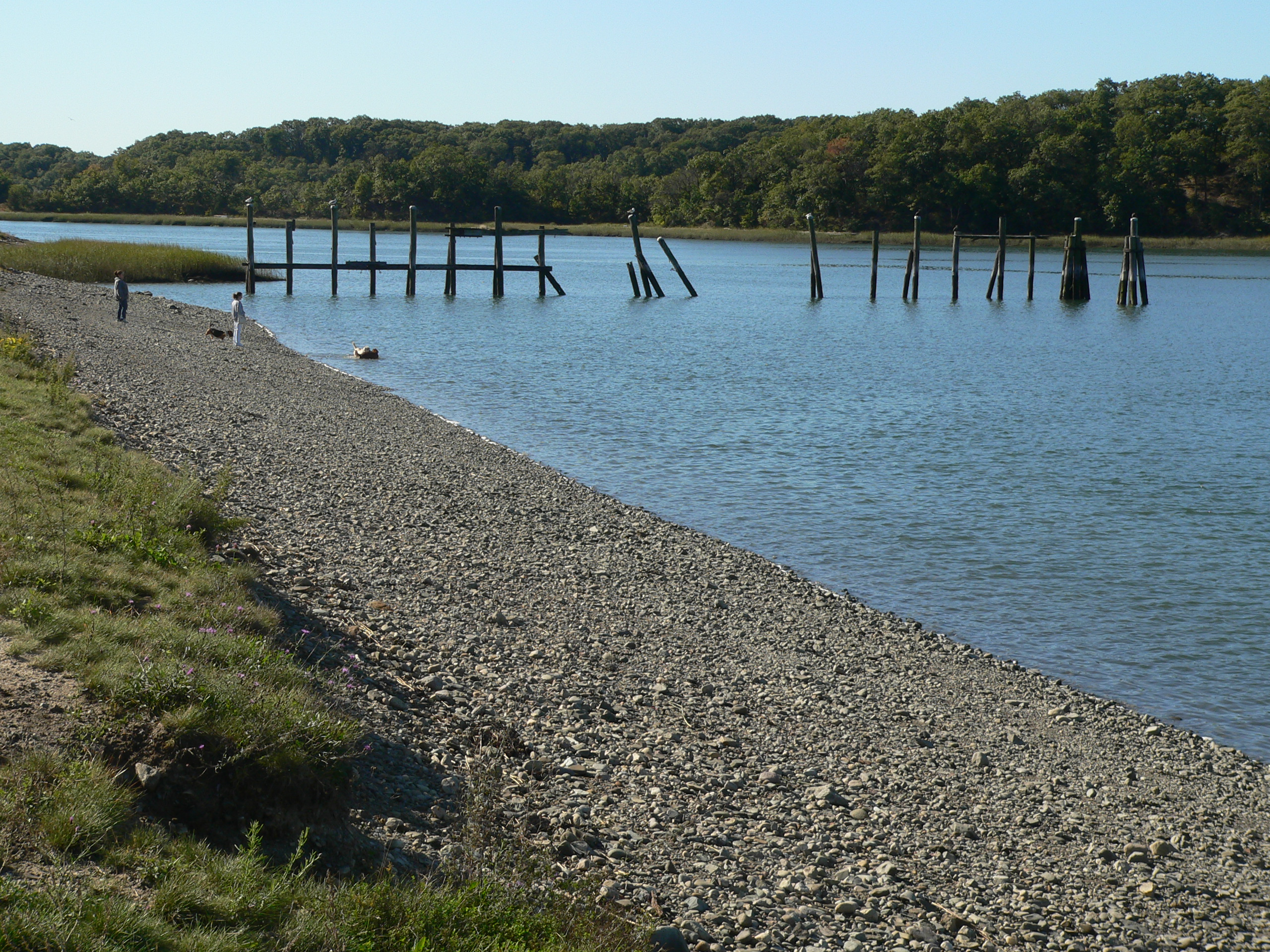
Pilings from former Navy pier

Bare Cove Park is a 484-acre park designated for wildlife and public recreation. It is located in Hingham, Massachusetts, on the Weymouth Back River across from Great Esker Park.

== History ==
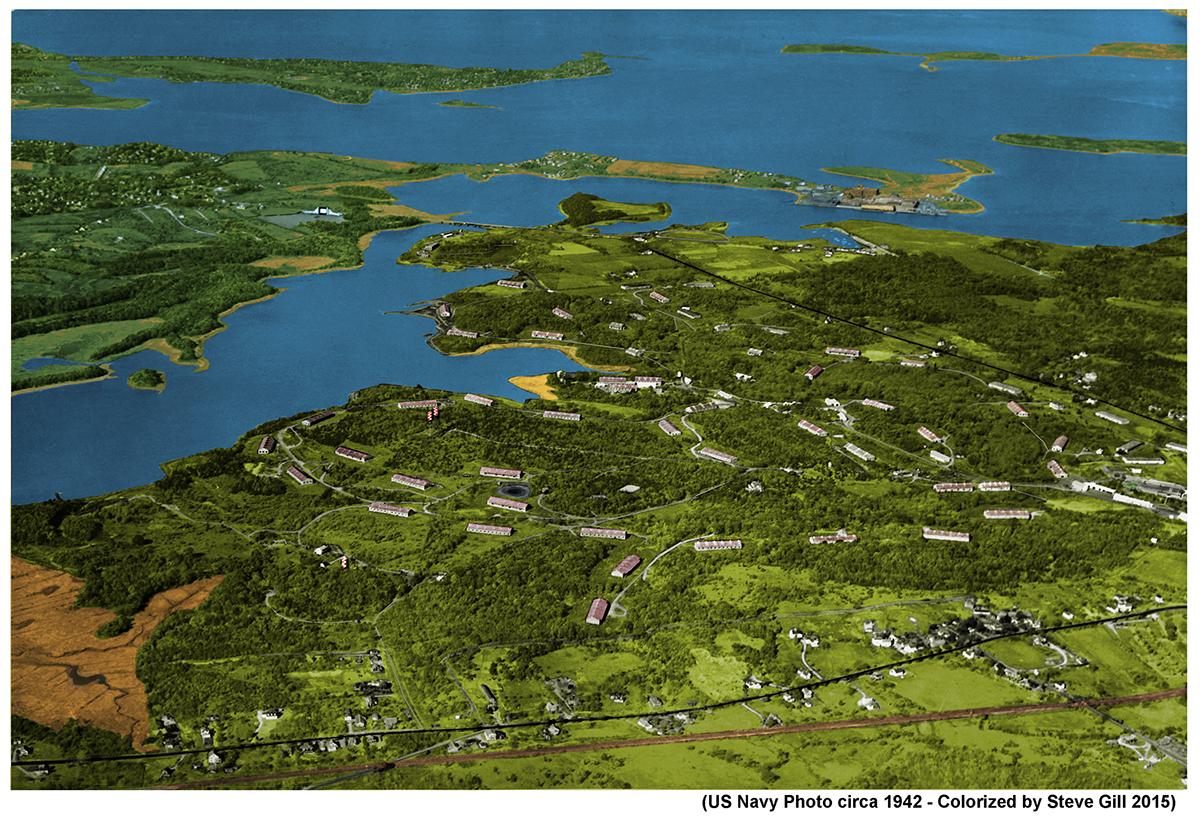
Navy aerial photo of Hingham Naval Ammunition Depot circa 1942 - Colorized by Steve Gill 2015.

Until 1906, the land now established as Bare Cove Park was privately owned. The U.S. Navy then established the Hingham Naval Ammunition Depot, also known as Hockley Hollow at the time, because of its close proximity to Boston Harbor. The depot stored munitions for aircraft and ships until it was decommissioned in 1961, and the land was given to the towns of Hingham and Weymouth in the early seventies. Hingham's portion of the land was transformed into Bare Cove Park and opened its gates to the public in 1974. The town of Weymouth created Great Esker Park with their land.

== Park features ==
Bare Cove Park Features multiple paved paths and trails that are often used for walking, jogging, and biking. The park consists of acres of woods, marshes, wetlands, fields, and river shoreline and is also scattered with retired naval bunkers. Many of the bunkers which have been demolished since the depot was decommissioned, leaving wide and open fields in their place.

=== Dog walking ===
Bare Cove Park is very popular for dog walkers. Dogs must be leashed unless the dog owner has an Off-Leash Dog Walking Permit for the park. There is signage around the park designating where dogs may be off-leash.

=== USS YF-415 Memorial ===
There is a memorial stone and flagpole located in the park, memorializing the crew of the USS YF-415, who were lost in an accident on May 10, 1944.

== Wildlife ==
The park provides a sanctuary for diverse wildlife including minks, foxes, raccoons, and rabbits. Birds, including ospreys, double-crested cormorants, snowy egrets, and great blue herons, are seen significantly more by park-goers.

== Gallery ==
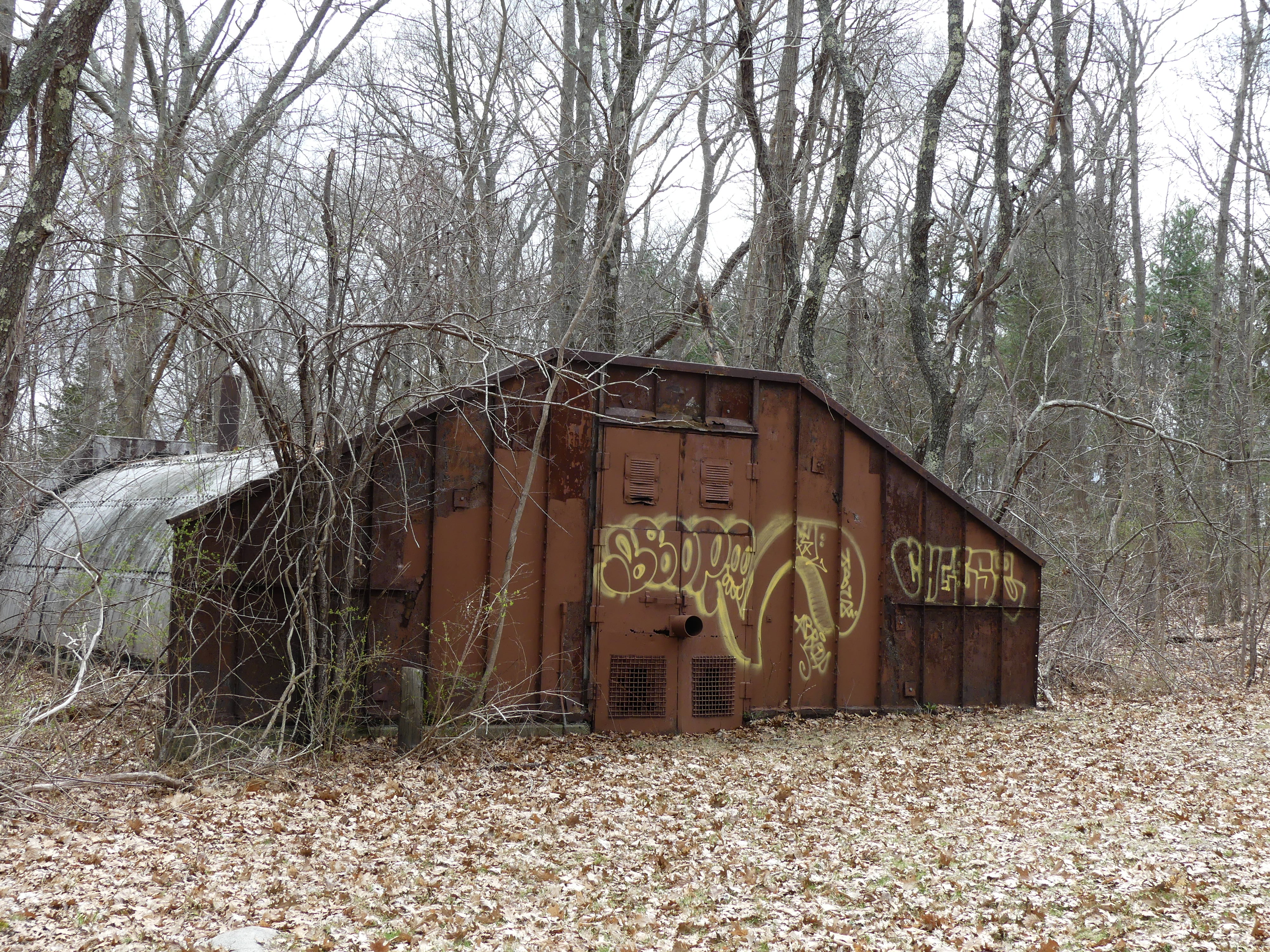
A decommissioned naval ammunition bunker

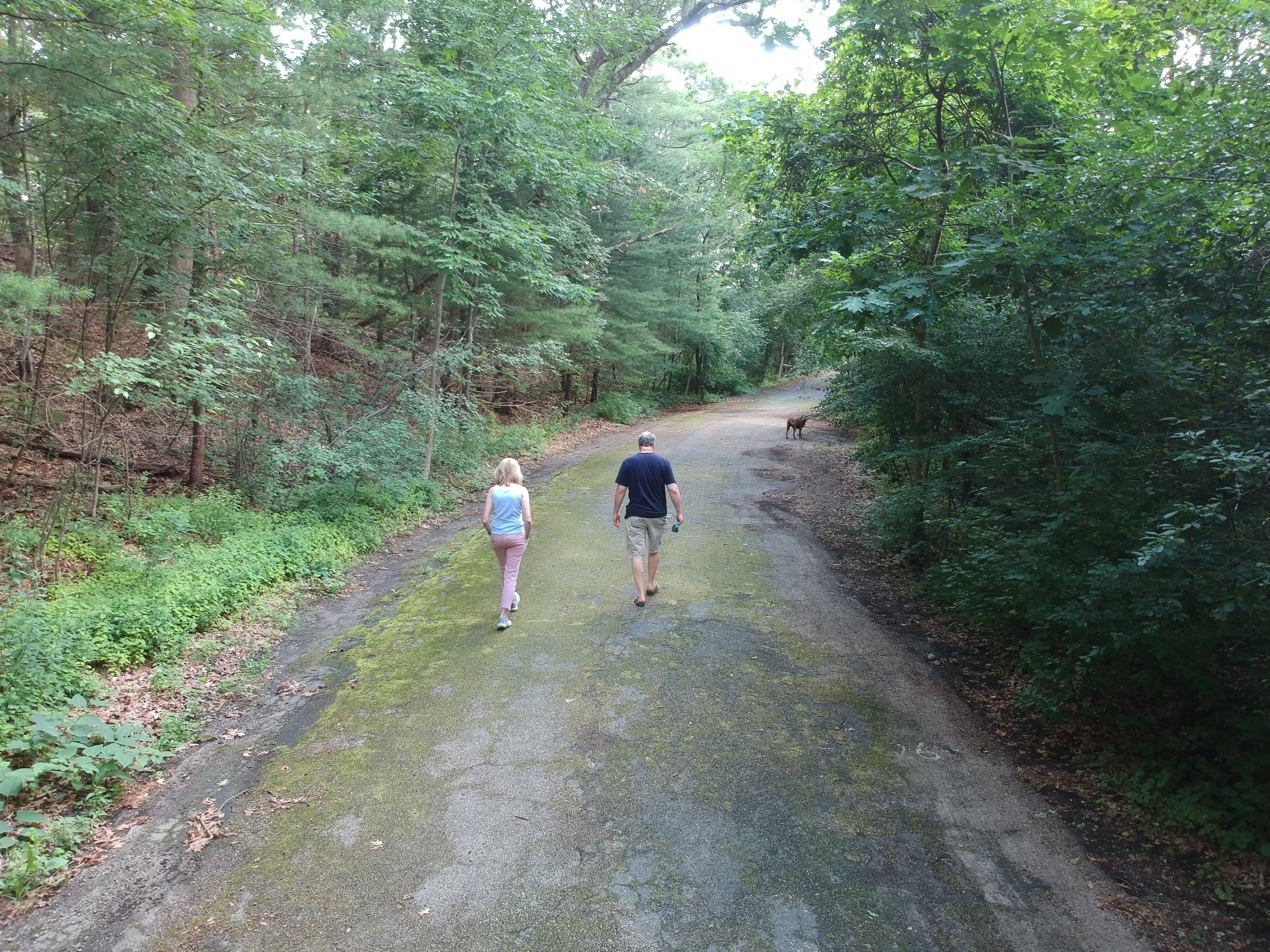
Two people walking on a path

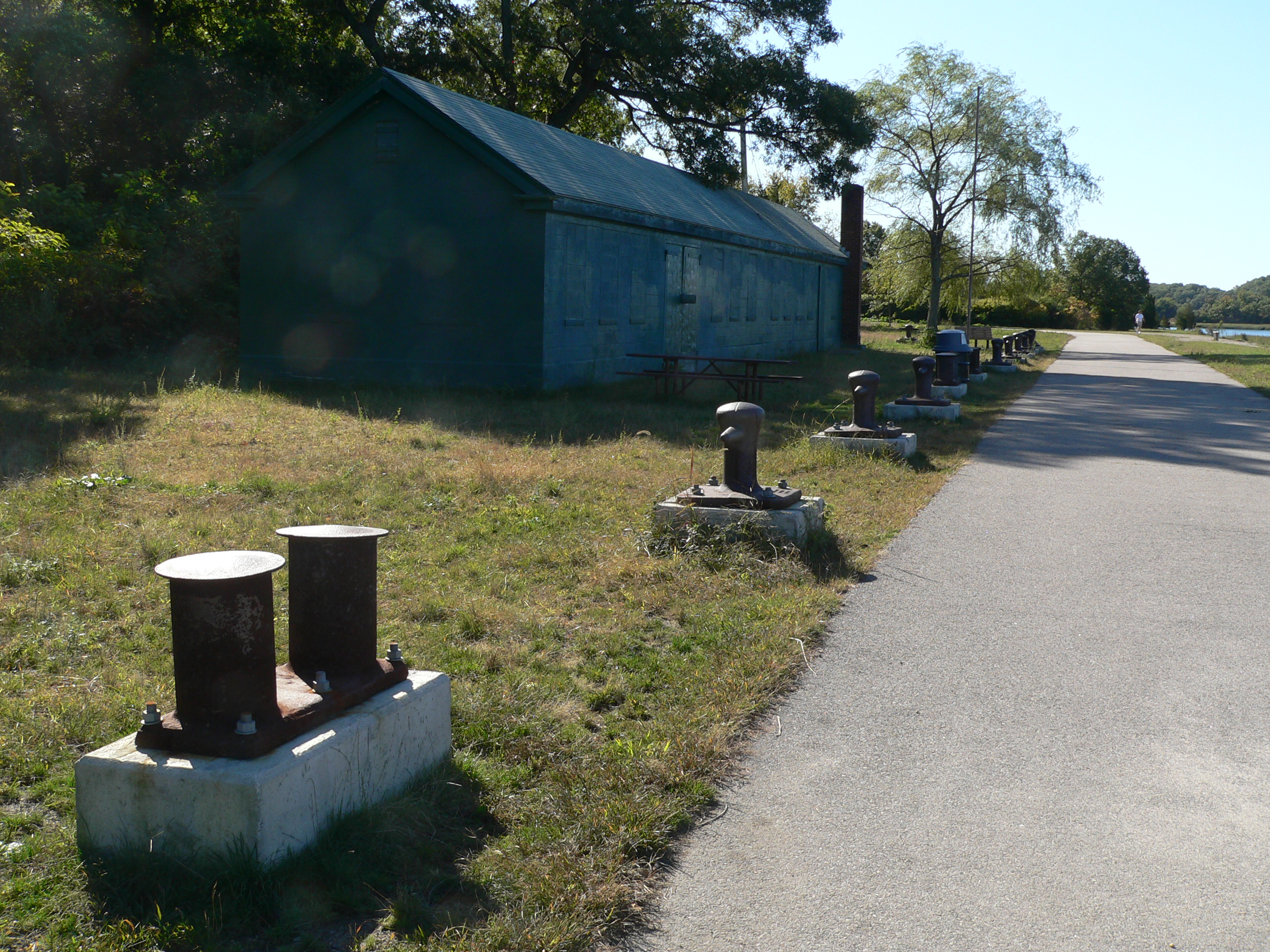
Mooring posts from former Navy base

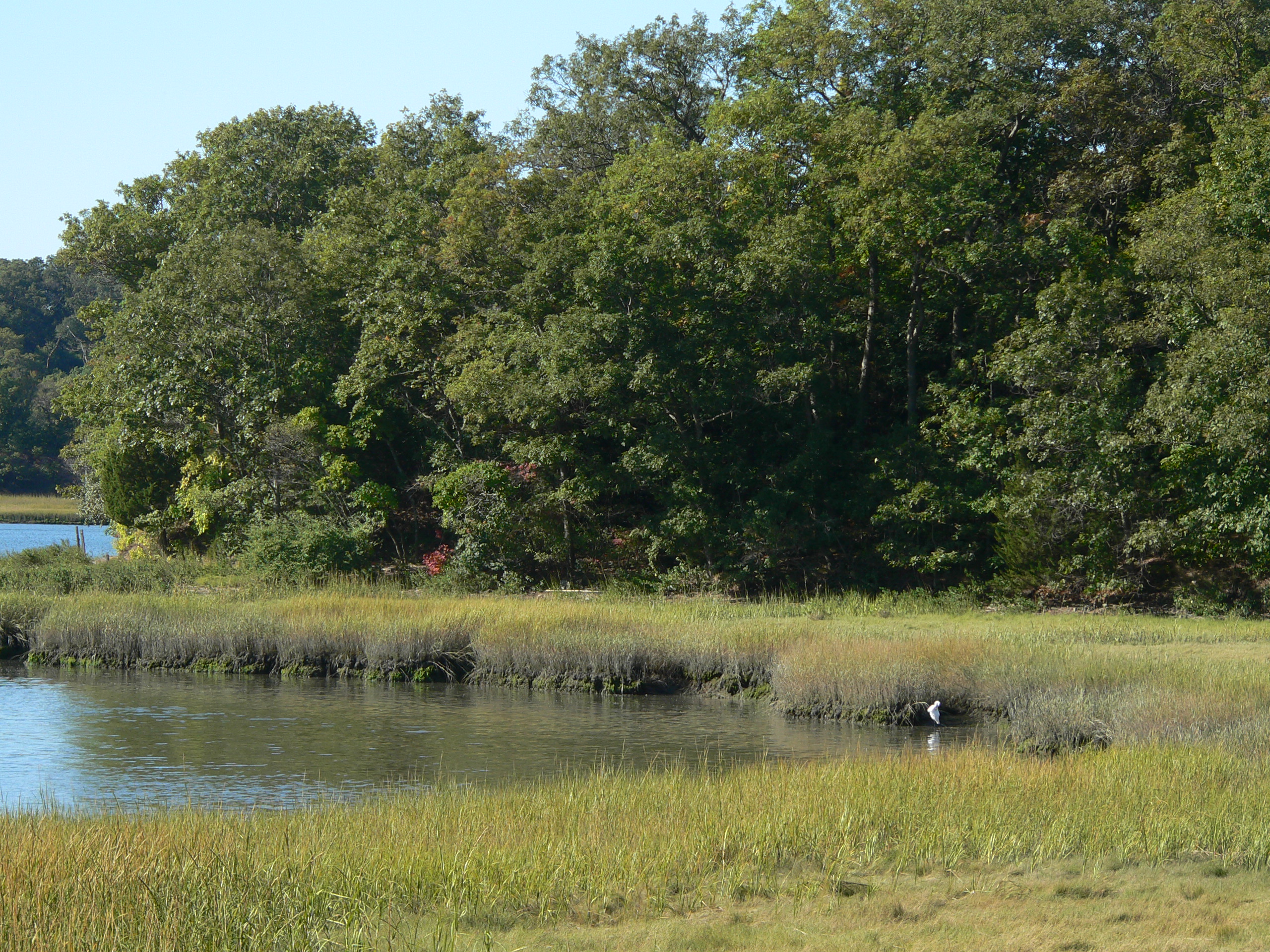
Egret in Back River

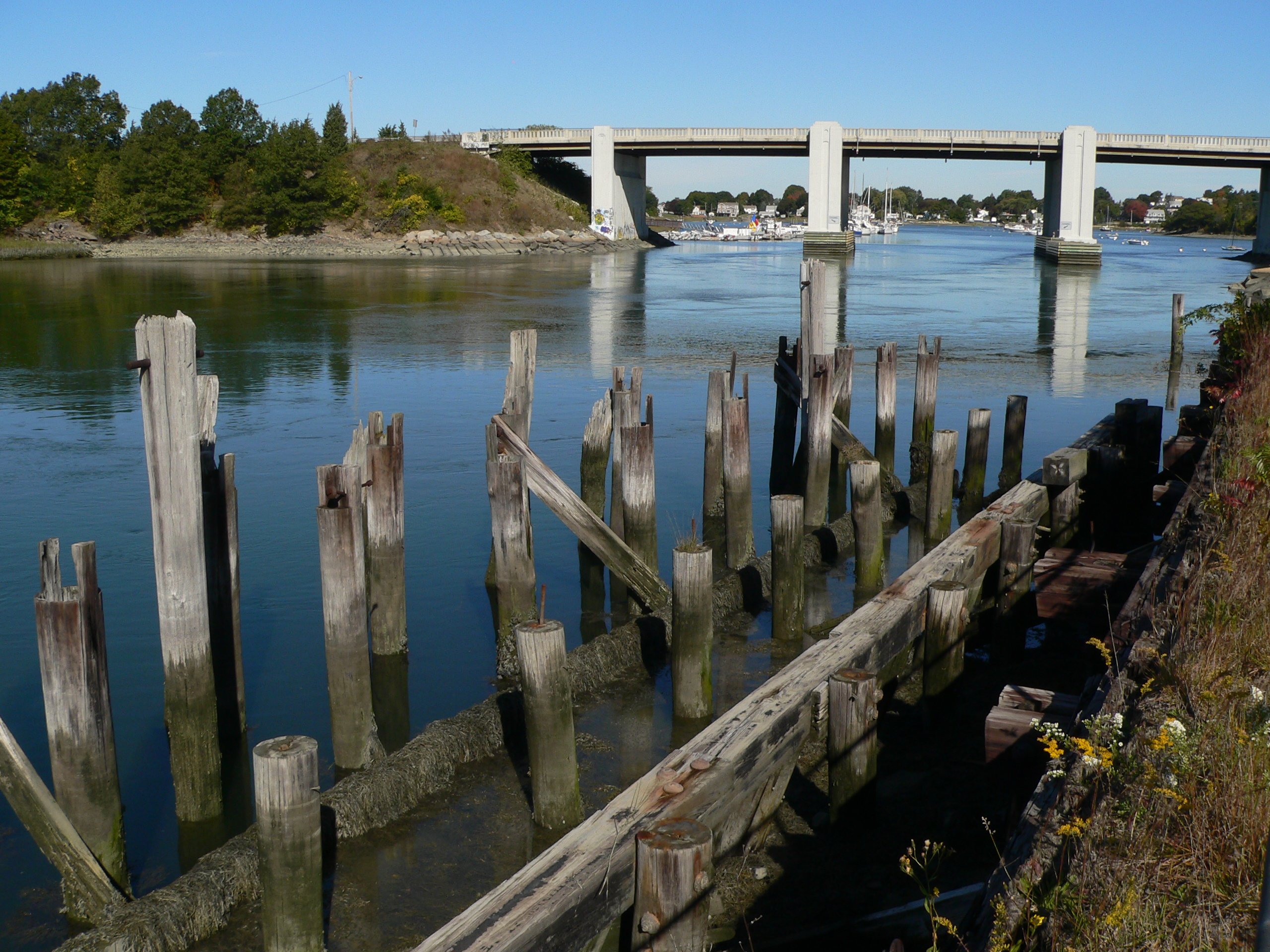
Route 3A bridge over Back River, viewed from the park

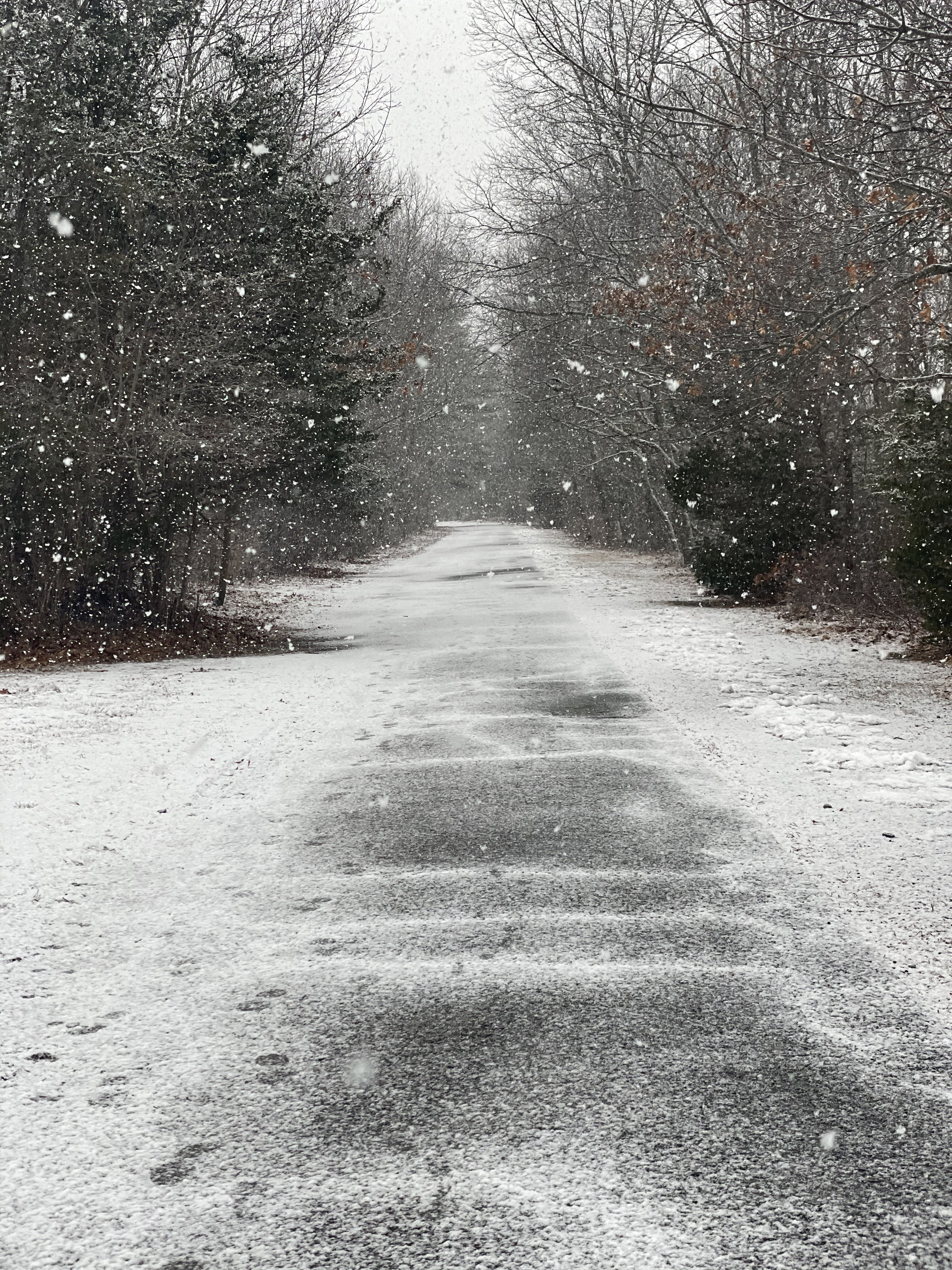
A beautiful snowy path through Bare Cove
