= Great Salt Pond, Sint Maarten =

Pond on Sint Maarten in the Dutch Caribbean

Coordinates: 18°01′50″N 63°02′46″W

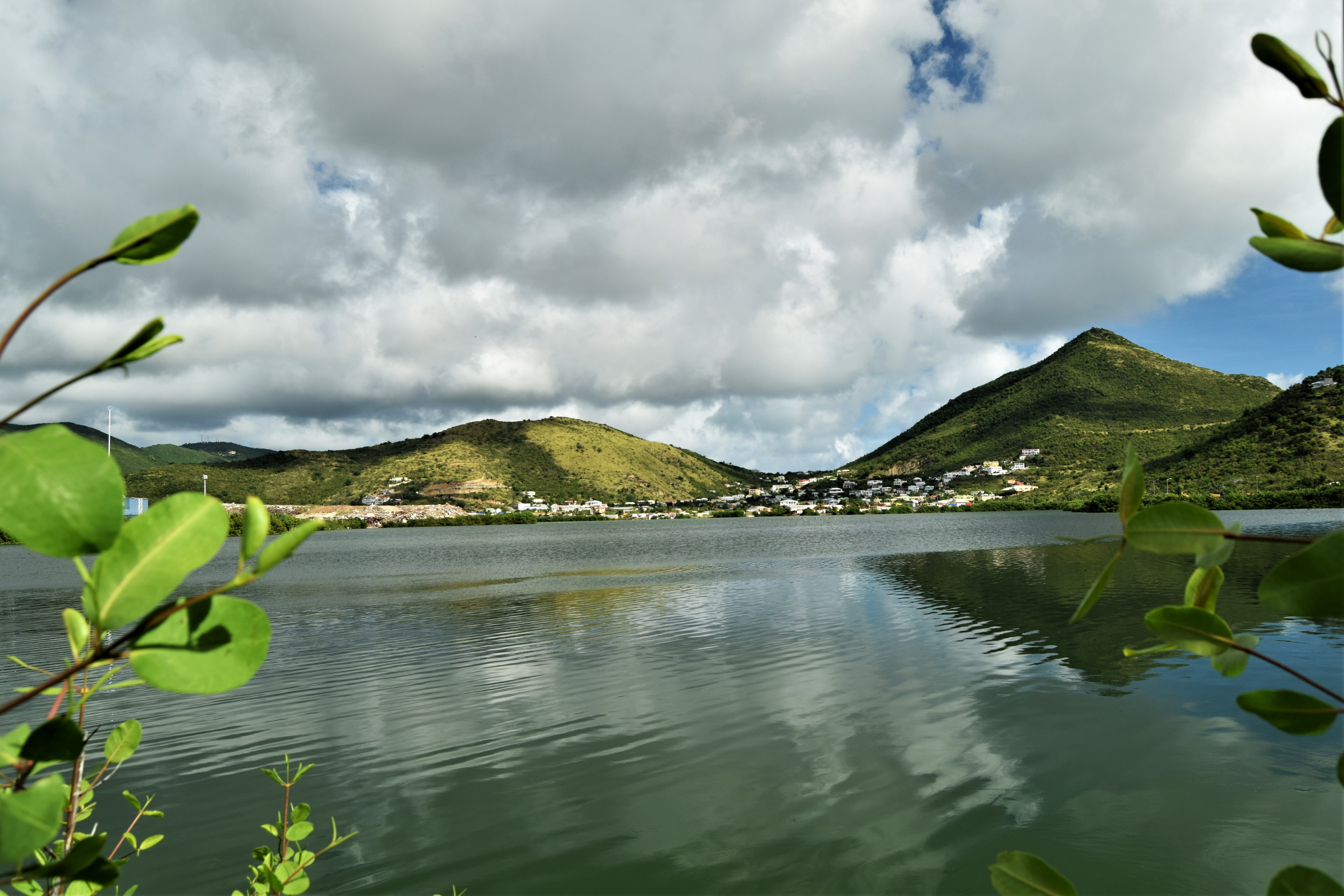
Great Salt Pond

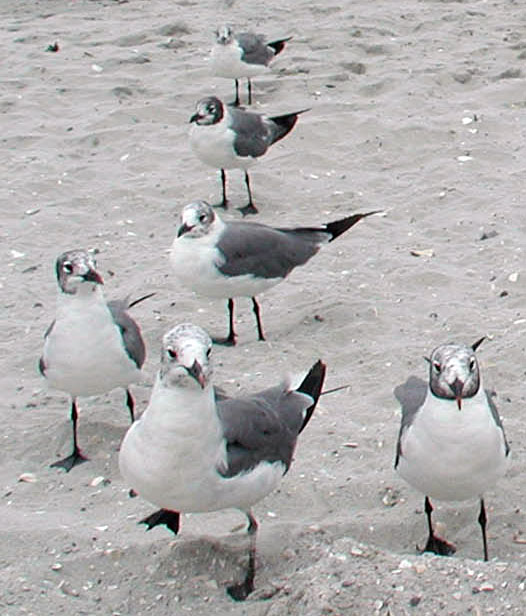
Laughing gulls use the IBA in large numbers

Great Salt Pond is a 188 ha 465 acres water body in the country of Sint Maarten on the island of Saint Martin in the Dutch Caribbean. It has been identified as an Important Bird Area by BirdLife International because it supports a large seasonal aggregation of laughing gulls. It borders the capital city of Philipsburg and is the largest pond on the island. It has a high salinity (27-38 parts per thousand) and suffers pollution from landfill and urban runoff.
