= Weymouth Back River =

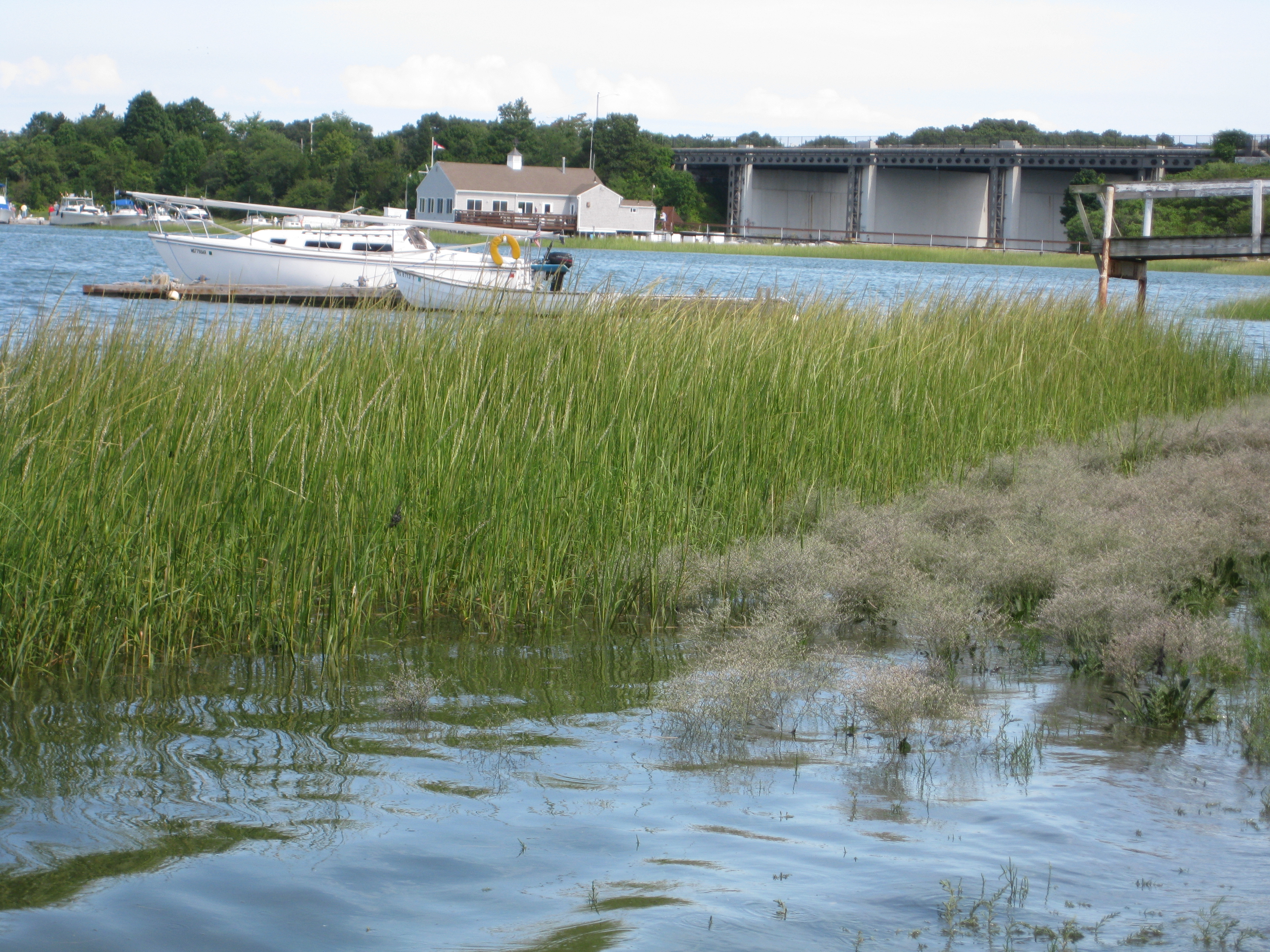
- David's Island at Weymouth Back River Bridge (Route 3A)

Location
- Country: United States
- State: Massachusetts
- Cities: Weymouth, Hingham

Physical characteristics
- Source: Whitman's Pond
  - location: East Weymouth, Massachusetts, United States
  - coordinates: 42°12′45″N 70°55′40″W
  - elevation: 20.5 ft (6.2 m)
- Mouth: Hingham Bay
  - location: Weymouth, Massachusetts, United States
  - coordinates: 42°15′52″N 70°55′1″W
  - elevation: 0 ft (0 m)

Basin features
- Tributaries
  - right: Fresh River (Massachusetts)

The Weymouth Back River, sometimes called Back River, is a short, primarily tidal river in Hingham and Weymouth, Massachusetts, about 10 miles (16 km) south of Boston. It arises from a number of tributaries in ponds and swamps, such as Whitmans Pond, flows northward, and empties into Hingham Bay just south of Grape Island and Slate Island.

== History ==
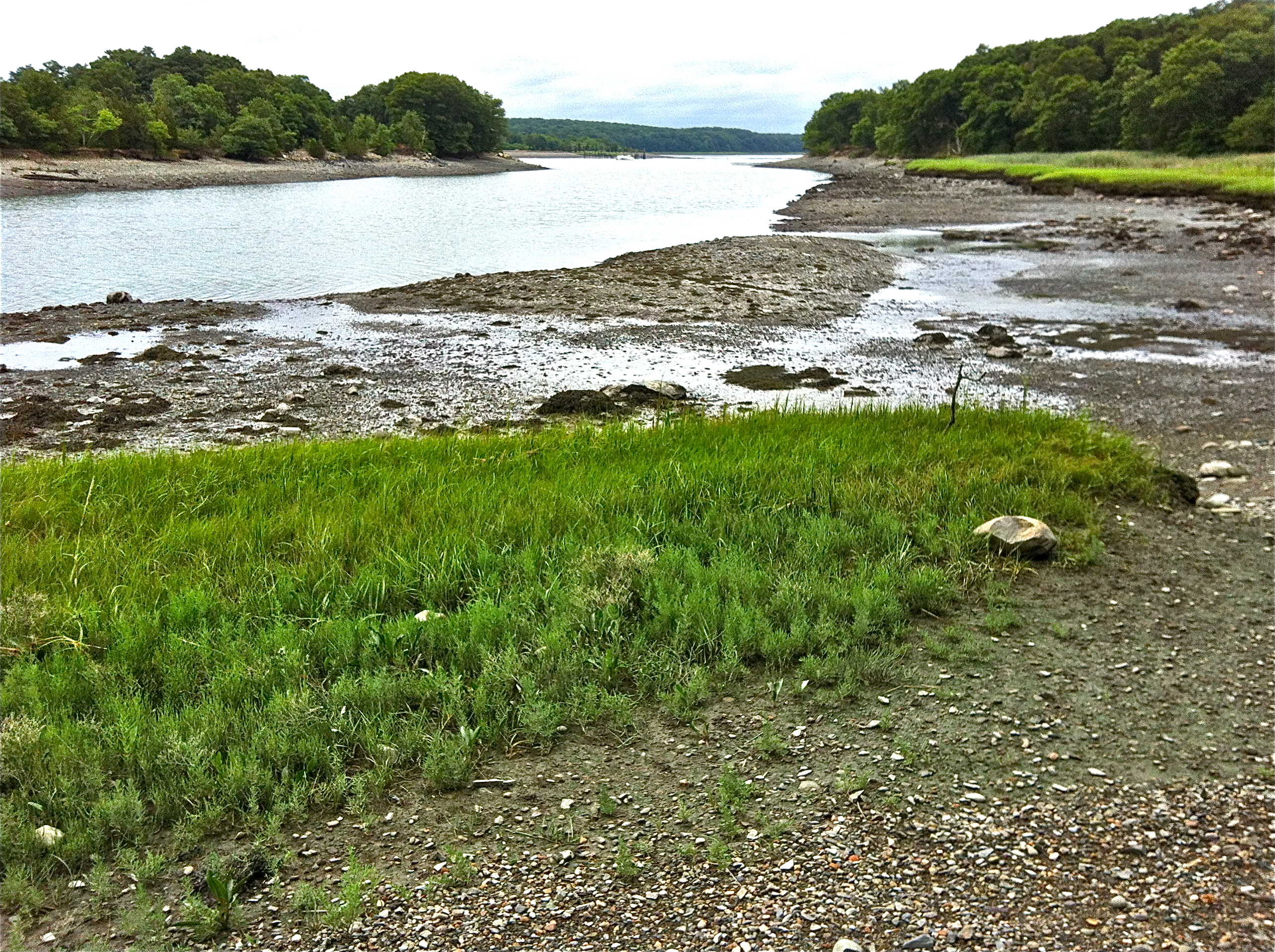
Looking upstream from Great Esker Park

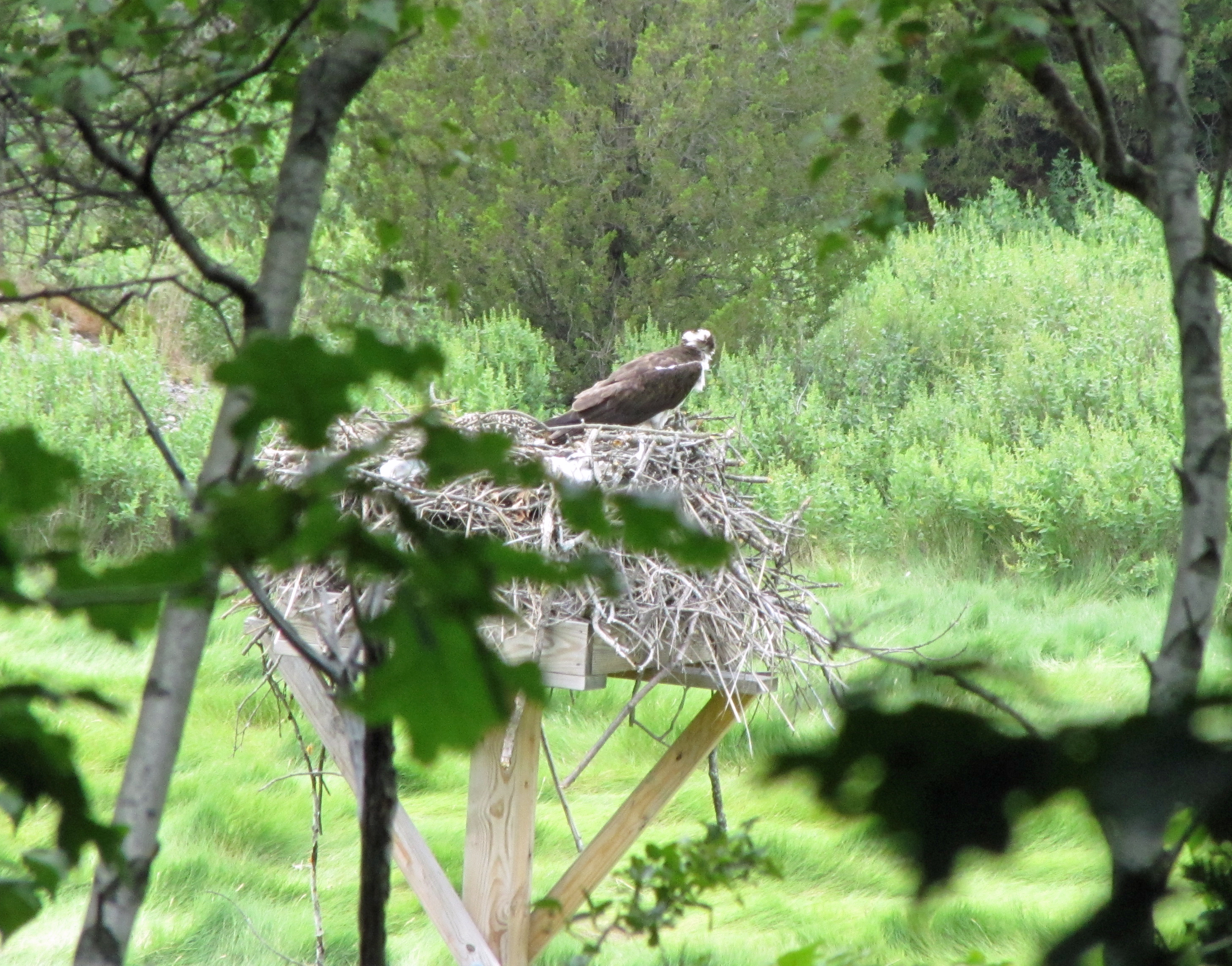
Osprey in nest on artificial platform in Beal's Cove in Bare Cove Park in Hingham

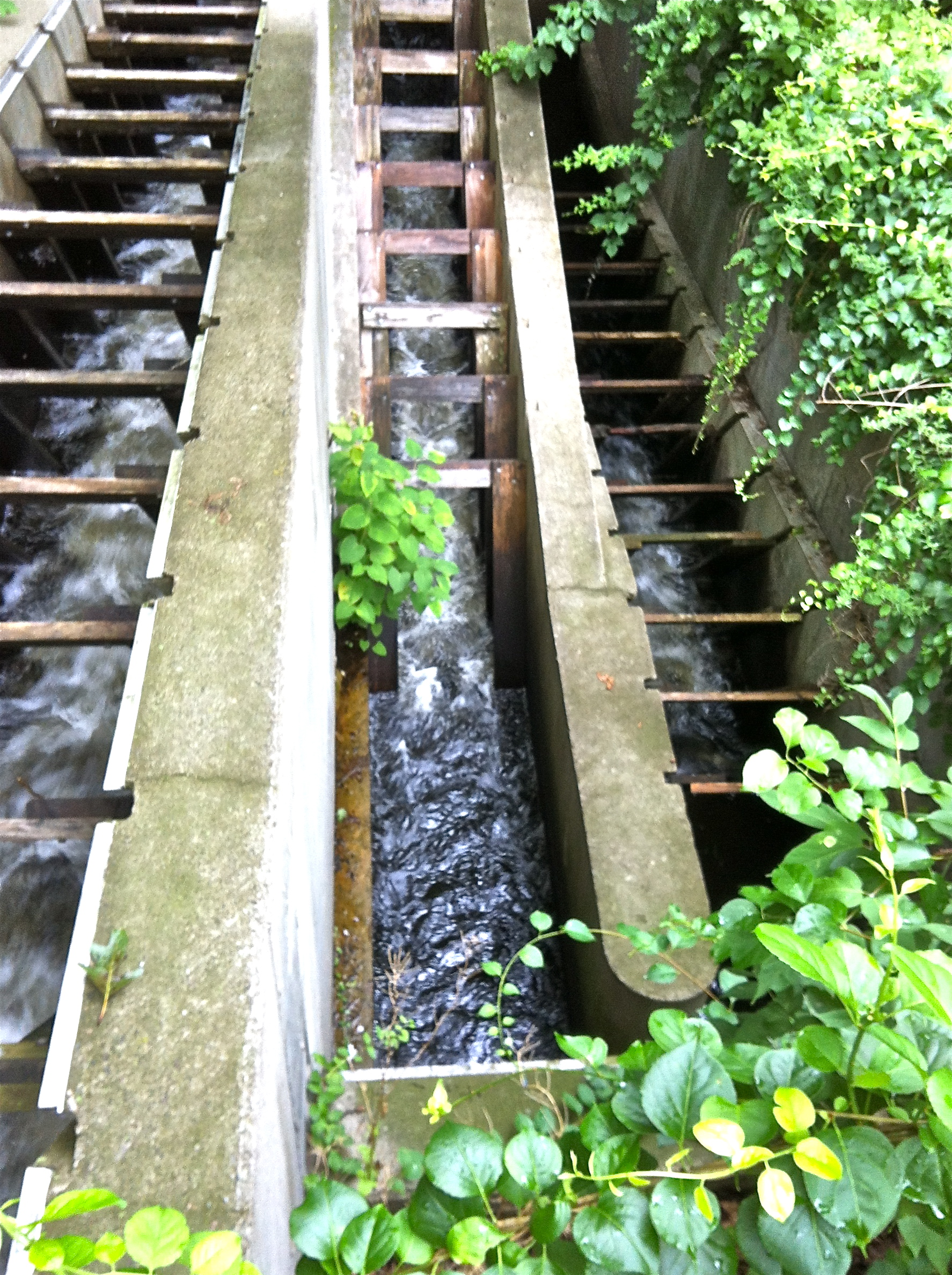
Double switchback fish ladder for herring runs up the river to Whitmans Pond

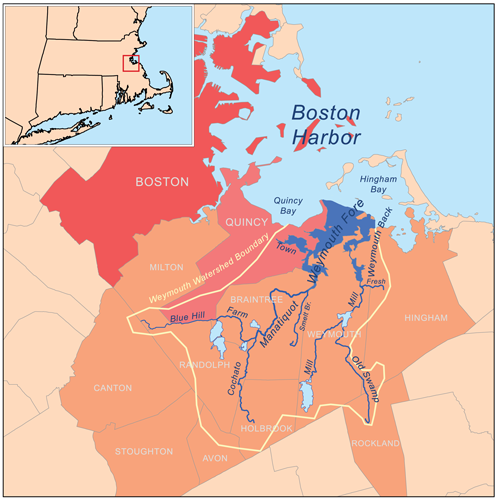
Map of the Weymouth watershed

The river formed as the last glacier retreated from New England about 12,000 years ago, when glacial melting increased the sea level and low – lying coastal areas were flooded. Its river herring runs were an important source of food to both native and European inhabitants, and it served as the Hingham-Weymouth boundary as early as 1635. Various industries have used the river, including a steel mill, wool factory, and fertilizer factory. During the 20th century, the Army Corps of Engineers conducted two projects on the river, completed in 1912 and 1943. The first created a large channel (12 feet deep, 200 feet (61 m) wide) from the river mouth to a former fertilizer company wharf, about one mile (1.6 km) upstream. The second deepened the channel to 15 feet (4.6 m).

== Watershed ==
Mill River, which drains Weymouth Great Pond (elevation 161 feet (49 m)), and Old Swamp River, both enter Whitmans Pond (elevation 66 feet (20 m)), the latter is the source of Weymouth Back River. After Weymouth Back River becomes a tidal river it receives Fresh River from the right as one heads downstream.

== Ecology ==
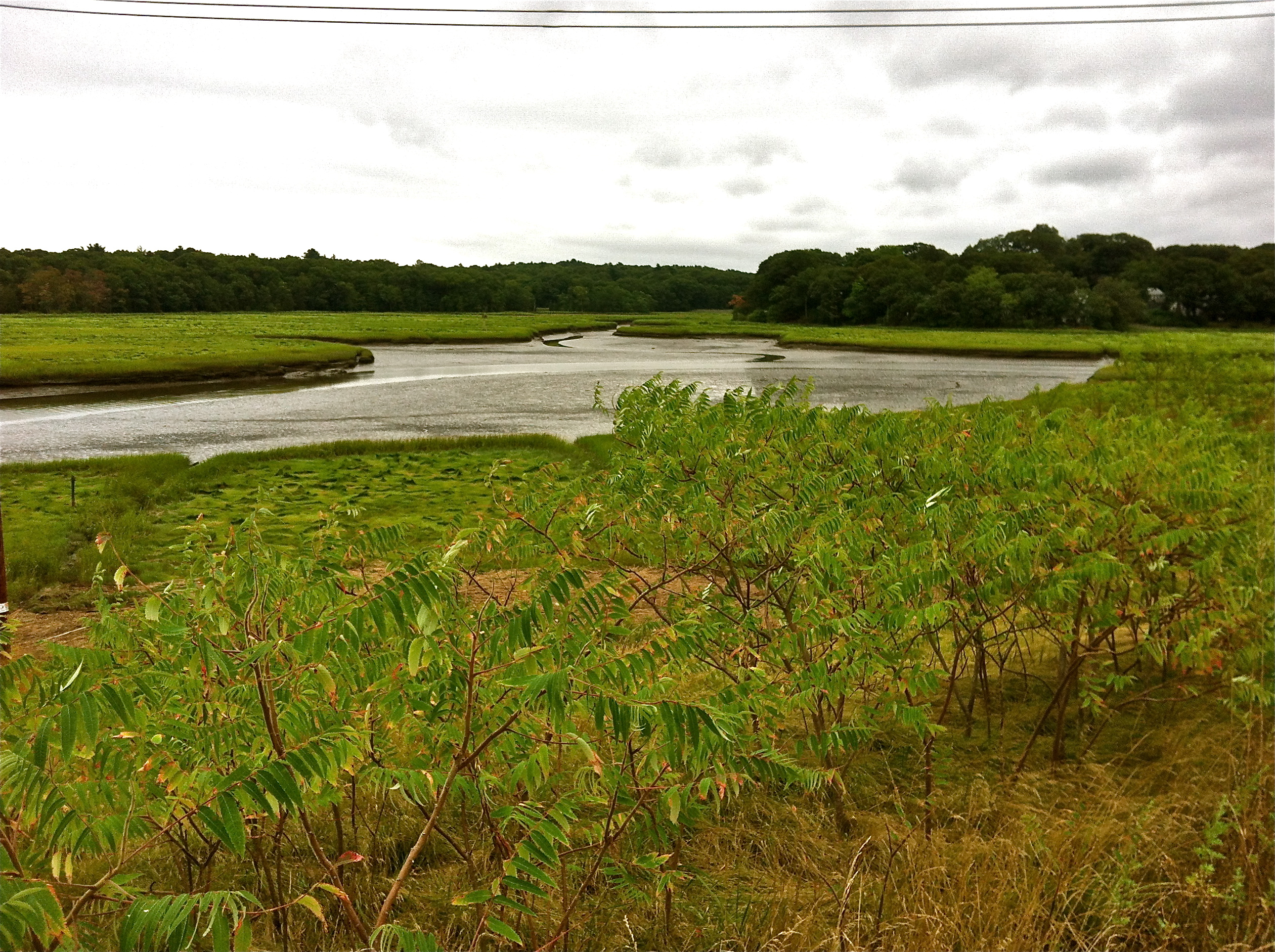
Upper tidal marsh of Weymouth Back River taken from Great Esker Park, looking upstream from below Humane Society

The river is part of the Weymouth Back River Area of Critical Environmental Concern (about 950 acres), of which some 180 acres (0.73 km^{2}) are tidal waters. It is home to about 150 species of birds in its salt marshes and is bounded by wooded wildlife preserves.

A sizeable herring run was an important food source for Weymouth's citizens as documented in town records as early as 1648. At Iron Hill Park off Iron Hill Street, Whitman's Pond was dammed to turn the machines which processed the natural bog iron for the Weymouth Iron Works. Later, the Commonwealth of Massachusetts installed a herring ladder to allow the herring to bypass the dam on their spawning runs. Historically the herring ran to Whitman's Pond, and beyond up Mill River and Swamp River, to Great Pond.

River herring commonly refers to two species, Blueback herring (Alosa aestivalis) and alewife ((Alosa pseudoharengus)). Today, 1/2 million river herring and Rainbow smelt (Osmerus mordax) run up the river each year to spawn (although they are not able to ascend the fish ladders and only utilize the tidal portions of the river).

Several nesting platforms were constructed and are in use by the Osprey, or fish hawk, (Pandion haliaetus), which has white under parts and a wingspread of 5 to 6 ft (152 to 183 cm). It feeds almost exclusively on live fish including flounder, herring and perch, and is usually seen hovering over the water, into which it plunges feet first to grasp its prey.

== Recreation ==
The Weymouth Back River offers a canoe and kayak paddling resource within the Greater Boston Metropolitan Area. Harbormasters from Hingham and Weymouth established the river as a no-wake zone, with no water-skiing and no personal watercraft allowed south of the Route 3A Bridge. A number of parks and reservations line the river's shores, including Abigail Adams Park, Stodder's Neck, Great Esker Park (Weymouth), and Bare Cove Park (Hingham).

Bicycling and hiking is popular along both sides of the Back River on the Back River Trail which connects multiple sites of environmental and historical interest.

== See also ==
- Weymouth Back River Reservation
