= Fresh Prince =

Fresh Prince may refer to:

- Will Smith (born 1968), also known as the Fresh Prince, American actor, rapper, and film producer
  - The Fresh Prince of Bel-Air, an American TV series starring Will Smith
    - "The Fresh Prince of Bel-Air", a 1992 song by DJ Jazzy Jeff & the Fresh Prince and the theme song for the TV series
    - Will Smith (The Fresh Prince of Bel-Air), also known as the Fresh Prince, the protagonist of the TV series portrayed by Will Smith
- "Fresh Prince" (song), a 2014 song by Soprano featuring Uncle Phil
