= Hingham Naval Ammunition Depot =

- Part of United States Navy
- Hingham, Massachusetts
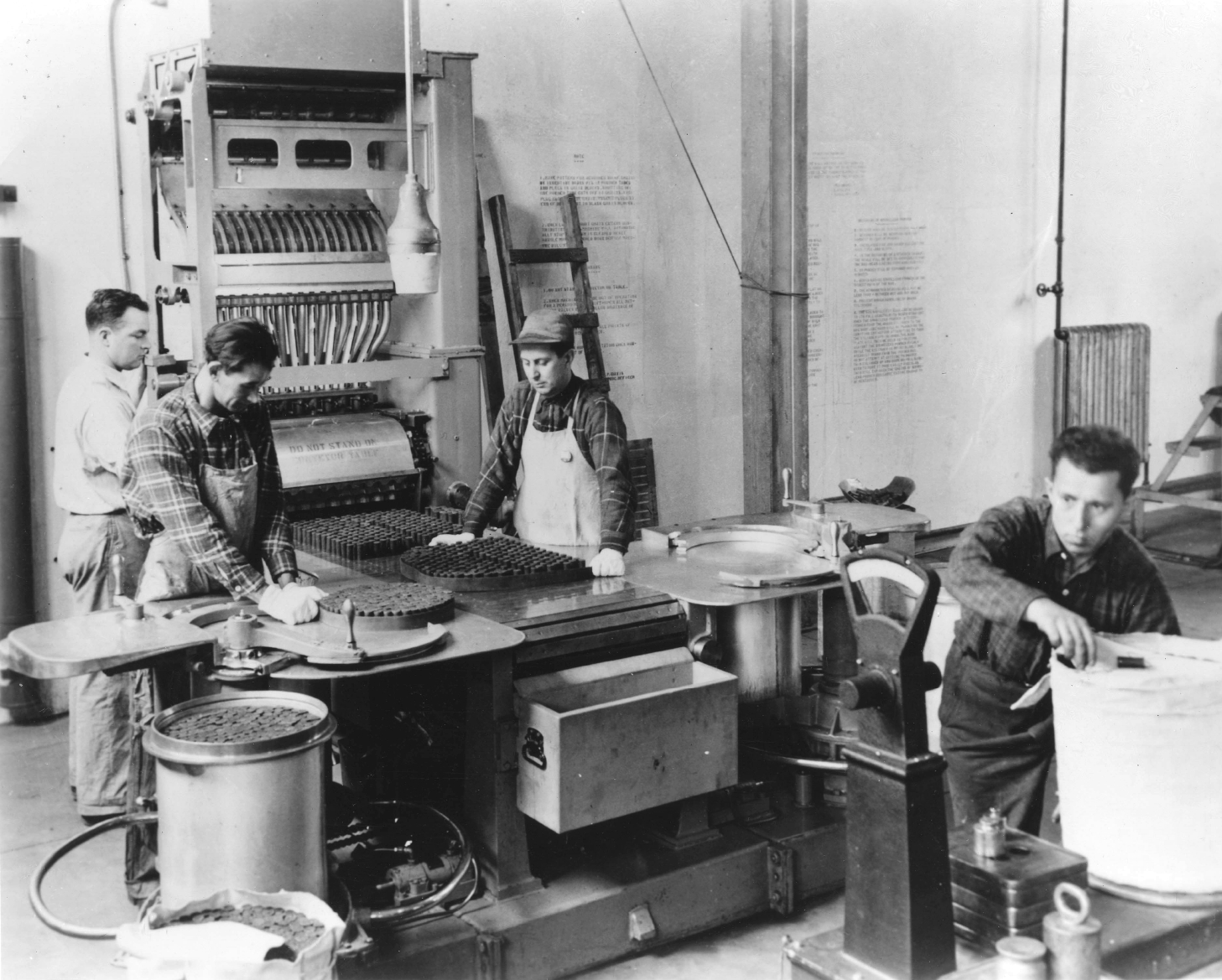
- Employees working with the Automatic 16 Inch Powder Stacking Machine during World War II

Site information
- Type: Ammunition Depot
- Controlled by: Navy
- Open to the public: Yes

Location
- Coordinates: 42°14′8.12″N 70°54′58.61″W

Site history
- In use: 1903-1961

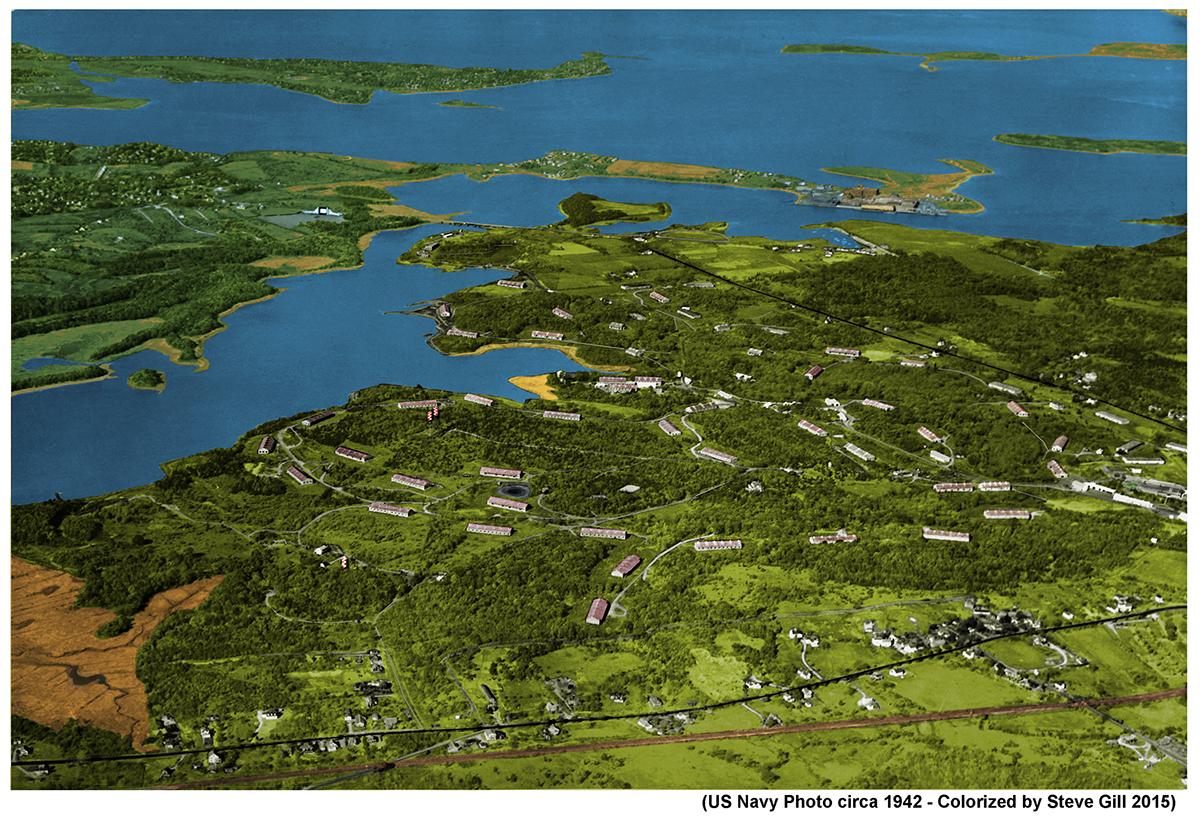
US Navy aerial photo of Hingham Naval Ammunition Depot circa 1942 - Colorized by Steve Gill 2015.

The Hingham Naval Ammunition Depot, is a former United States Navy ammunition depot located in Hingham, Massachusetts. At its peak, it employed over 2,400 people. It also consisted of 90 buildings at that time. The Hingham Naval Ammunition Depot Annex was located nearby, and served as a storage area for the depot.

== History ==
From 1903 until 1961, The Hingham Naval Ammunition Depot (originally called the Hingham Naval Reserve) was a major supplier of U.S. munitions, occupying 990 acres (4.0 km2) on the Weymouth Back River (in the section once known as The Hockley). Camp Hingham was a US Navy training camp from 1917 to 1925; its land became part of the depot. At peak capacity in 1945, over 2,400 civilians and military personnel worked there. In the mid 1950s, the site contained over 90 buildings, its own telephone exchange, and 15 cranes. The base was decommissioned in 1961, though the Navy held on to the property until 1971, when it was turned over to the town of Hingham. Today much of the site is now occupied by the town's Bare Cove Park.

Starting in 2016, the U.S. Army Corps of Engineers launched a multi-year investigation into potential hazards in and around the former depot. The Corps identified six areas of interest and searched for undetonated pieces of ordnance. So far, nothing has been found.

== See also ==
- List of military installations in Massachusetts
