= Fresh River (Massachusetts) =

Tributary in Norfolk County, Massachusetts, U.S.

Coordinates: 42°13′31″N 70°55′18″W

The Fresh River is a tributary of the Weymouth Back River in Norfolk and Plymouth counties, Massachusetts in the United States.

== See also ==
- List of rivers of Massachusetts
