= Fresh Start (politics) =

1990s grouping of British eurosceptics

Fresh Start was a grouping within the British Conservative Party opposed to the Maastricht Treaty. It was founded by Michael Spicer and its members included Bill Cash, James Cran, Christopher Gill and Roger Knapman. In the mid-1990s over fifty Conservative MPs were members.

They organised votes against John Major's government and in all they voted against the government 985 times and abstained 1,515 times in an unsuccessful attempt to stop the Maastricht Treaty being ratified.
