= FreshAir =

- Edinburgh; Scotland
- Broadcast area: Edinburgh, UK

Programming
- Format: Alternative contemporary

Ownership
- Owner: n/a (student society)

History
- First air date: 3 October 1992

Links
- Website: freshair.radio

FreshAir is an alternative music student radio station serving Edinburgh, Scotland. Launched on 3 October 1992, FreshAir is one of the oldest surviving student radio stations in the UK. The station won the "Student Radio Station of the Year" award at the Student Radio Association awards in 2004 & was Scottish Station of the year 2011 (Scottish New Music Awards).

FreshAir is a registered student society with Edinburgh University Students' Association, but remains an independent body entirely funded by sponsorship and membership subscriptions. It broadcasts at FreshAir.radio.

== History ==
In the autumn of 1990, Edinburgh University student Robert Barrow conducted a survey to gauge support for a student radio station within the university. In the course of the survey Barrow met fellow student Eric Wilkinson, and soon partnered with him to form the Edinburgh Student Radio society, with the initial aim to set up a permanent radio station. By the beginning of the following academic year, they realised that this was perhaps overly ambitious as a starting point, and instead focused on the idea of a short term broadcast, taking advantage of the Radio Authority's new scheme of restricted service licences.

With support from the Edinburgh Enterprise Centre, ESR recruited prospective presenters and ran a training course with the help of John Gray, formerly of BBC Scotland. The team also identified a site from which the broadcast could be run and, eventually, a name for the station: Fresh Air FM (other suggestions included Outburst Radio, UFM and plain old Edinburgh Student Radio). The final hurdle, finance, was cleared by the procurement of a grant from the Edinburgh University Development Trust to supplement advertising income: together this represented sufficient funding to cover the costs of a two-week RSL broadcast.

Fresh Air FM was launched on 3 October 1992. As one of the first wave of student restricted service licence (RSL) stations in the UK, the initial broadcast generated a lot of media interest, not all positive: numerous incidents involving the use of bad language on the air drew criticism from both the media and the Radio Authority. This initial broadcast was followed by a shorter one in December of that year to coincide with the European summit. The first broadcast to make full use of the time restriction imposed by the station's RSL – 24 hours a day, for 28 consecutive days – occurred in October 1994, and Fresh Air FM successfully conducted biannual 28-day broadcasts thereafter, typically in the months of October and May.

=== T In the Park 1997 ===
At the invitation of Glasgow sister station Subcity Radio, Fresh Air FM ran the Edinburgh end of an ambitious three-site RSL broadcast for the T in the Park festival in the summer of 1997. Together the two stations mounted a major outside broadcast operation at the T in the Park site near Perth. With generous sponsorship from Philips Consumer Communications, Fresh Air FM was able to record interviews on minidisc, edit them in the on-site editing suite and send them via ISDN to the Glasgow and Edinburgh studios. There, interviews and features were blended with a playlist showcasing the extraordinary diversity of music at featured at the event.

=== 2000-2 financial difficulty ===
Aside from the initial grant opportunities, company and council sponsorships, FreshAir.org.uk remains to this day an entirely self-funded station. It is purely reliant on self-procured advertising and sponsorship money instead of university funding.

With the costs of a 28-day FM RSL just managing to stay within the four-figure mark, Fresh Air FM barely managed to break even, and often ran into debt. The situation came to a head in 2002, where debts reached a level that was unsustainable. This forced the committee to make the difficult decision to suspend any future broadcast until all debts were repaid.

Notably, the university's students association proved unsupportive of the society's efforts, suggesting the society disband and start from scratch, operating under the association's umbrella organisation. Bravely, the society declined.

The refinancing process took two years, but the society was successful in its efforts, and returned with a positive bank balance to broadcast on FM in April 2004. The broadcast kicked off with an hour-long outside broadcast from the city's renowned venue called The Venue, and featured a set by local band The Hustlers. As this was the first broadcast to be simulcast on the Internet, the decision was made to drop the "FM" from the station name. Thus, Fresh Air was henceforth the way in which the station was branded, with the website still live today (now at FreshAir.radio).

=== 2004 - Station of the year ===
FreshAir's successful turnaround and preparations for the April 2004 broadcast were documented in full. The station sent these along with a 20-minute compilation tape as part of the station's entry in the "Station of the Year" category at the annual Student Radio Awards. A 40-strong delegation from the station attended the awards ceremony in November of that year, where it was announced that FreshAir had won the top prize of the night for the first and, so far, only time.

The prize included the chance to pre-record a freeform, two-hour music-based show for BBC Radio 1, to be broadcast on Christmas morning. Four society members were flown down to London: two to act as the show's presenters, and two to act as producer and production assistant. Music that was chosen for the show consisted of a number of FreshAir favourites, but also featured music from, and interviews with, some up-and-coming Scottish bands including the popular Scottish dance producer Mylo.

=== 2006 to 2008 – the transition to Internet radio ===
2004 proved to be a bittersweet year for FreshAir, as changes to Edinburgh University's academic calendar that autumn forced the station to fall back to an annual 28-day broadcast schedule, usually conducted in February or March.

In February 2006, the launch of the local talk radio station Talk 107 forced FreshAir off the air again, when Ofcom refused to issue any short-term licences surrounding the station's launch to discourage competition, citing section 1.7 of its notes for applicants document. The society opted instead to broadcast exclusively over the Internet for two months. In order to broadcast online legally using the required licences issued by the MCPS-PRS Alliance and Phonographic Performance Limited, significant finances still had to be raised to support the broadcast.

The 2007 Fresh Air FM RSL application was once again denied by OfCom, due to the imminent launch of local community station Leith FM. However, changes to online licensing laws enabled the station to broadcast all year round on the Internet via its web site, allowing over ninety hours of live programming to be broadcast during each week of term-time.

For the 2007/2008 broadcast, the blueprint from the previous year was followed and FreshAir.org.uk continued to be an internet radio station. It was one of the first Student stations to be placed in the 'College' tab of iTunes Radio.

The addition of a second studio meant FreshAir.org.uk could begin pre-recording shows so that content could be aired after studio access hours. The addition of the Magic Button in 2006 meant that an automatic play-out system could cycle playlist tracks between the hours of midnight and 10 am.

=== 2008 to 2011 – notable events ===
For the 2007/2008 broadcast all live events were rebranded: all club nights, gigs and other fundraisers went under the 'Fresh Air Live Presents' brand. In that year, around fifteen live events were hosted under that brand.

The society organises a number of fundraising events at local venues around Edinburgh, and provides training to third parties, most notably as part of the European Union Vienna Project. At the time, fundraising for other causes raised the profile of the station, from its involvement in John Peel Day 2006 to its participation in Hearing Aid 2007, in aid of Comic Relief.

On 25 February 2011, Freshair.org.uk hosted the world's first bicycle-powered radio show. The hour-long outside broadcast was powered by two mounted bicycles with attached dynamos. The event raised awareness for climate change, and was done in collaboration with Transition Edinburgh University.

=== College Radio Day 2012 ===
On 2 October 2012, FreshAir.org.uk took part in the second College Radio Day. Between 11 am and midday (GMT) FreshAir.org.uk hosted an hour of the 24-hour global radio show. The show was played out on 585 stations in 29 countries as well as the dedicated College Radio Day stream. FreshAir.org.uk's portion of the broadcast was a live show from The Pleasance Theatre; it was presented by Eve Livingston and Alex Rata and featured a live performance from Scottish band Paws.

=== Rebranding, and a studio makeover (2015) ===
In 2010, the station rebranded to resemble its entirely internet-based status, and officially became FreshAir.org.uk. The slogan 'Edinburgh Student Radio' was used for all its advertising and branding purposes.

In 2015, helped by a generous donation from the university, FreshAir.org.uk's Pleasance studio was redecorated. Old flyers were removed, a new sound desk was installed, and a new sense of optimism emerged for the start of the 2014/5 Spring Term broadcast.

=== 2015 to 2018 – studio relocation and server issues ===
As part of the Edinburgh University Students' Association's £6 million investment in The Pleasance, subsequent renovations forced FreshAir.org.uk's studio to be moved twice between 2015 and 2017, though broadcasting continued as normal.

Since 2017, FreshAir.org.uk's studio has been located in the basement of Pleasance West- EUSA's new hub for media societies.

In 2017, FreshAir.org.uk's website underwent a redesign by then-Webmaster Leonardo Mazzone. The new design included features allowing listeners to message presenters directly, and there was a more user-friendly approach when it came to reading the site's published content.

In February 2018, FreshAir.org.uk's server 'Megatron' failed, resulting in the station going off air for the following six months.

=== Covid-19 Pandemic (2020) ===
In March 2020, the University of Edinburgh was closed due to the ongoing COVID-19 pandemic. As a result, the FreshAir.org.uk studio was inaccessible to students and the station went off air. Members were given the opportunity to begin recording shows from home and on Sunday 26 April 2020, the station began broadcasting again with entirely pre-recorded material. Highlights of home-recorded content have included interviews with Inhaler (band), Fickle Friends, Jack Garratt and the Mother of Chanel the grey parrot.

== Support for Waverley Care ==
Various on-air and other fundraising events have been held in the past few years to raise money for Waverley Care. From 2007 until 2014, the main social event was the regular club night Twist and Shout, playing music from the 1960s. In 2015, this was replaced by 'Bump n Grind', a 90s and 00s RnB and hip-hop club night, which ran until early 2016.

FreshAir.org.uk continues to raise funds for Waverley Care, notably through yearly 24-hour broadcasts during the Edinburgh Festival Fringe,. Proceeds from the University of Edinburgh Media Societies Ball and club nights also raise donations.

== Fresh Fringe ==
The successful broadcast of 2006/2007 meant that Fresh Air was in a position to start covering the Edinburgh Fringe Festival in August 2007, the only Internet radio station to do so.

These days 'Fresh Fringe' operates as a separate entity from the normal term time station, with its own dedicated committee and separate sources of funding. The first year of broadcast (2007) focused on interviewing comedians at the festival rather than presenting music and building unique shows. Subsequent years have created more opportunities for a variety of shows, with more freedom for the presenters.

Notable guests have included Isy Suttie, Arj Barker, The Boy With Tape On His Face, Reginald D Hunter and Mark Watson. In 2012, Watson stopped off at FreshAir.org.uk studios on a mammoth day to promote his book The Knot. The late Scott Hutchison from Frightened Rabbit performed an exclusive session in the studio as part of the 24-hour broadcast in 2012, helmed by Finlay Niven and Christian Illingworth.

FreshAir.org.uk continues its coverage of the Edinburgh Fringe Festival under the name 'Fresh Fringe'. During Fresh Fringe 2019, Freshair.org.uk collaborated with The Mash House for a club night mini-residency, including Night Fever and DANCE WIV ME.

== See also ==
- Student Radio Association
