= East Weymouth station =

Train station in Weymouth, Massachusetts, US

East Weymouth
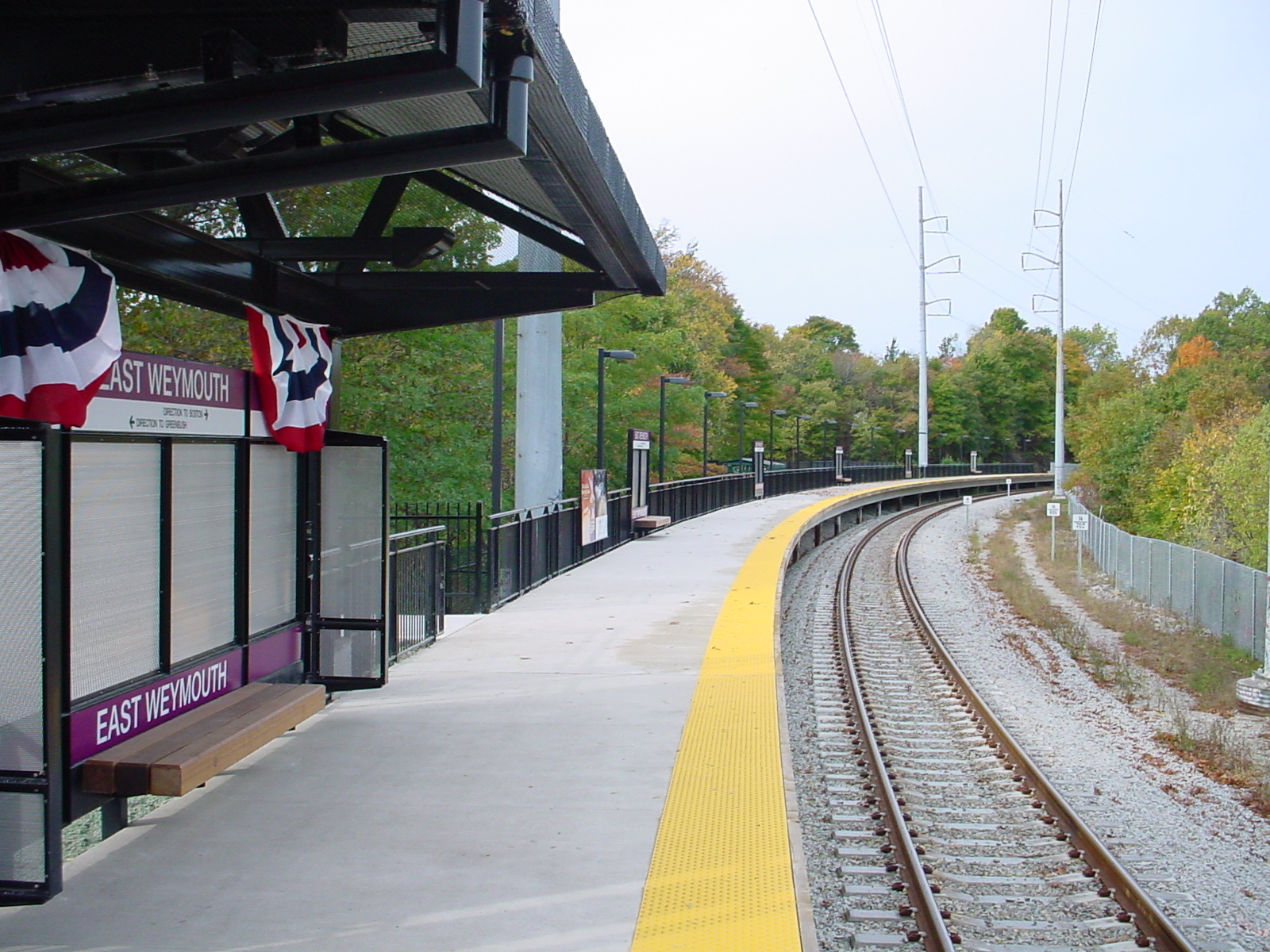
- East Weymouth station in November 2007

General information
- Location: 1590 Commercial Street; Weymouth, Massachusetts
- Coordinates: 42.21940°N 70.92311°W
- Line: Greenbush Branch
- Platforms: 1 side platform
- Tracks: 1

Construction
- Parking: 335 spaces ($4.00 fee)
- Accessible: Yes

Other information
- Fare zone: 2

History
- Opened: October 31, 2007
- Closed: June 30, 1959

Passengers
- 2024: 320 daily boardings

Services
Preceding station	MBTA	Following station
Weymouth Landing/East Braintree toward South Station	Greenbush Line	West Hingham toward Greenbush
Former services
Preceding station	New York, New Haven and Hartford Railroad	Following station
North Weymouth toward Boston	South Shore Line	West Hingham toward Greenbush
Location

East Weymouth station is an MBTA Commuter Rail station in Weymouth, Massachusetts. It serves the Greenbush Line, and is located in the East Weymouth village. It consists of a single side platform serving the line's one track. The station is fully accessible.

== History ==
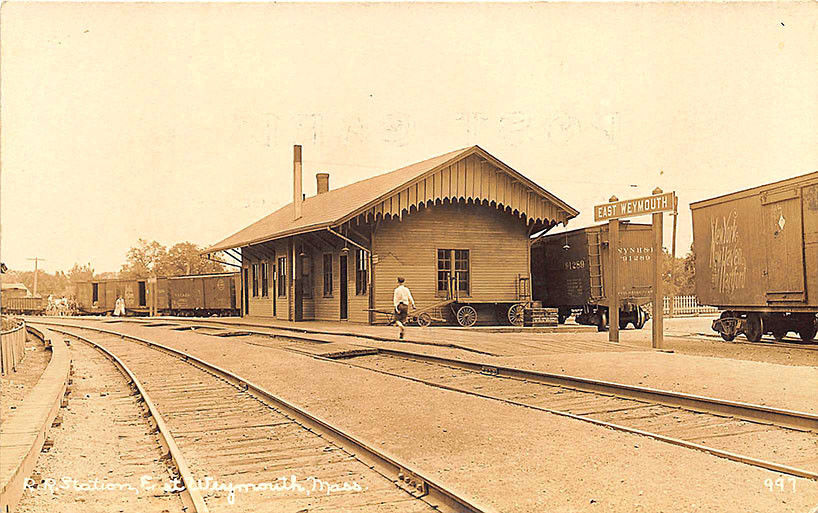
East Weymouth station in the early 20th century

The South Shore Railroad opened between Braintree and Cohasset on January 1, 1849. East Weymouth was among the original stations on the line. The South Shore Railroad was acquired by the Old Colony Railroad in 1877; the Old Colony was in turn acquired by the New York, New Haven and Hartford Railroad in 1893.

The New Haven Railroad abandoned its remaining Old Colony Division lines on June 30, 1959, after the completion of the Southeast Expressway. The East Weymouth station had been located off Station Street. The abandoned station building was demolished around 1970, while portions of the concrete platforms lasted into the early 21st century.

The MBTA reopened the Greenbush Line on October 31, 2007, with East Weymouth station off Commercial Street, east of the former location. As part of the project, the MBTA purchased the Durante property – a former wool mill site just north of the station – for environmental permitting use. The MBTA ultimately did not use the property, which needed soil remediation due to high concentrations of polychlorinated biphenyls and other industrial waste. As of 2025, the MBTA plans to perform the remediation and restore wetlands in 2026–2027.
