= Weymouth Landing/East Braintree station =

Train station in Weymouth, Massachusetts

Weymouth Landing/East Braintree
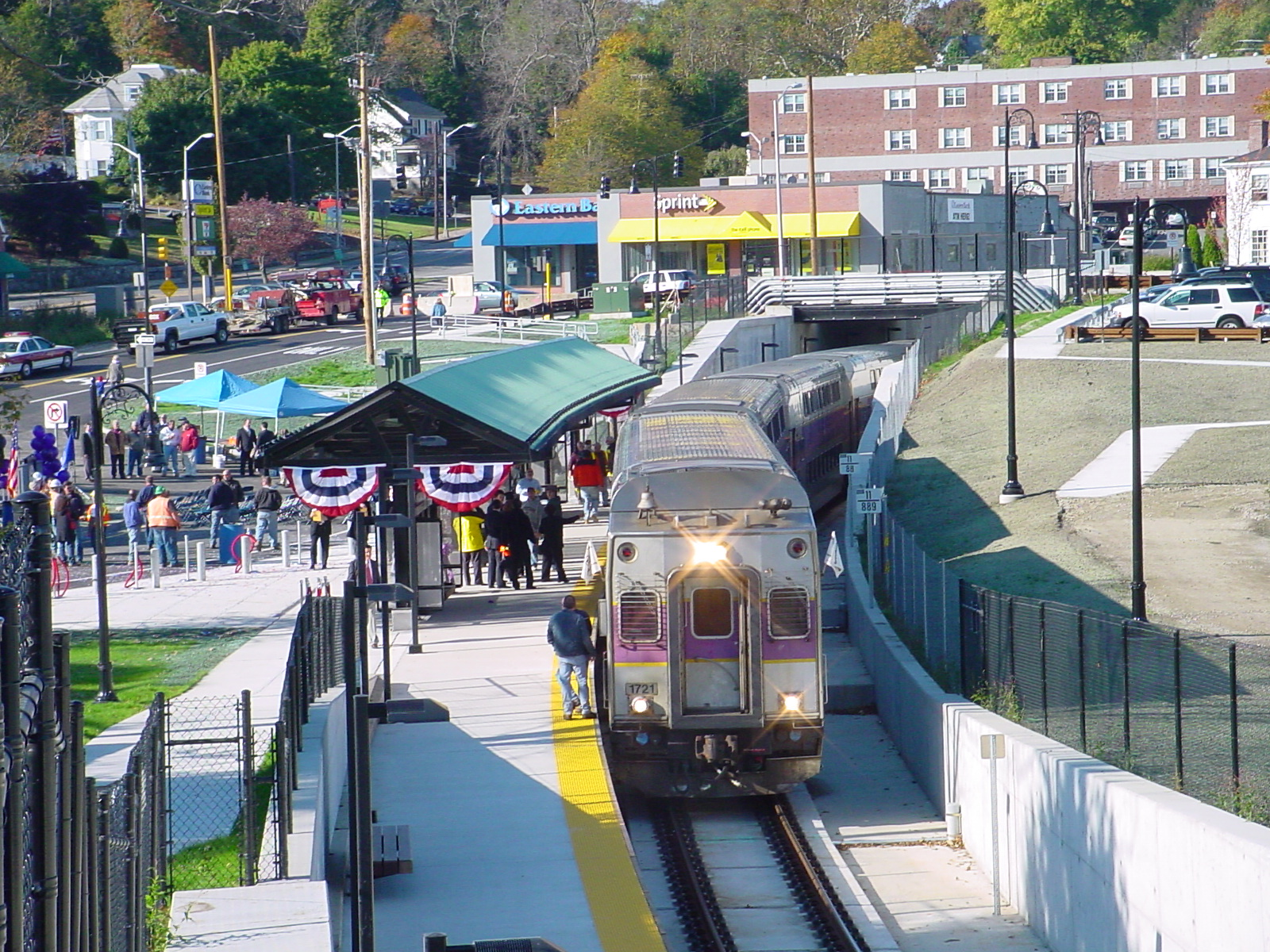
- A ceremonial train at the station on October 30, 2007, one day before the Greenbush Line opened

General information
- Location: 121 Commercial Street; Weymouth, Massachusetts
- Coordinates: 42.22148°N 70.96797°W
- Line: Greenbush Branch
- Platforms: 1 side platform
- Tracks: 1
- Connections: MBTA bus: 225, 226

Construction
- Parking: 290 spaces
- Accessible: Yes

Other information
- Fare zone: 2

History
- Opened: October 31, 2007
- Closed: June 30, 1959
- Former names: Weymouth

Passengers
- 2024: 364 daily boardings

Services
Preceding station	MBTA	Following station
Quincy Center toward South Station	Greenbush Line	East Weymouth toward Greenbush
Former services
Preceding station	New York, New Haven and Hartford Railroad	Following station
East Braintree toward Boston	South Shore Line	North Weymouth toward Greenbush
Location

Weymouth Landing/East Braintree station (signed as East Braintree/Weymouth Landing) is an MBTA Commuter Rail station on the border of Braintree and Weymouth, Massachusetts. It serves the Greenbush Line. It is located in Weymouth Landing, and consists of a single side platform serving the line's one track. The station is fully accessible.

== History ==
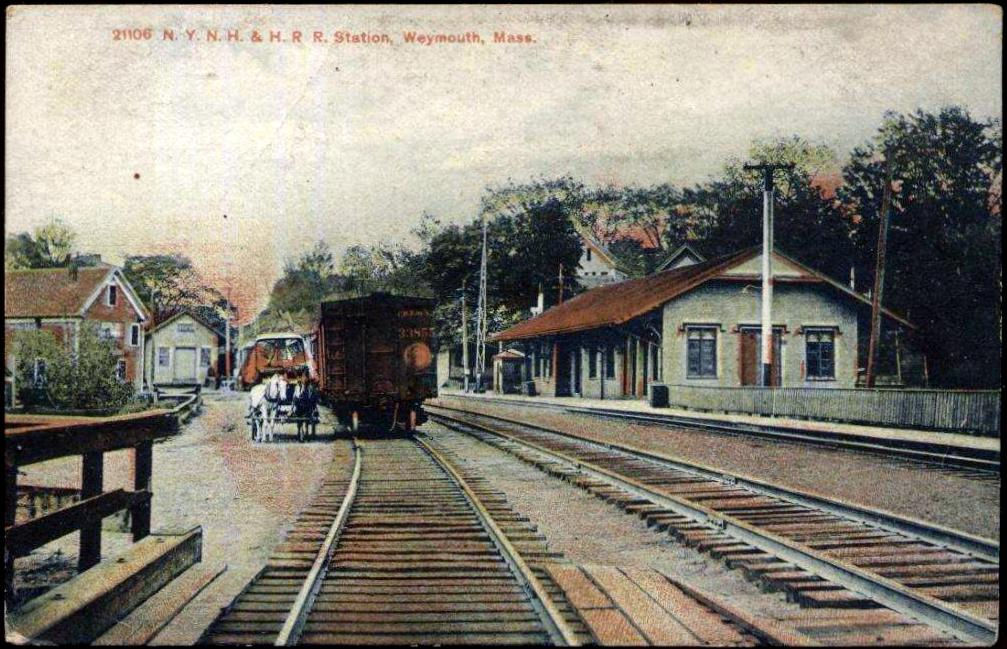
Weymouth station in the early 20th century

The South Shore Railroad opened between Braintree and Cohasset on January 1, 1849. Weymouth was among the original stations on the line. The South Shore Railroad was acquired by the Old Colony Railroad in 1877; the Old Colony was in turn acquired by the New York, New Haven and Hartford Railroad in 1893.

The New Haven abandoned its remaining Old Colony Division lines on June 30, 1959, after the completion of the Southeast Expressway. The Weymouth station had been located just west of Commercial Street.

The MBTA reopened the Greenbush Line on October 31, 2007, with Weymouth station located between Commercial Street and Quincy Avenue. Original plans called for a 450-foot (140 m) platform between the streets, but the MBTA ultimately decided to build a standard 800-foot (240 m) platform that extends under the streets at either end.
