= West Hingham station =

Train station in Hingham, Massachusetts, US

West Hingham
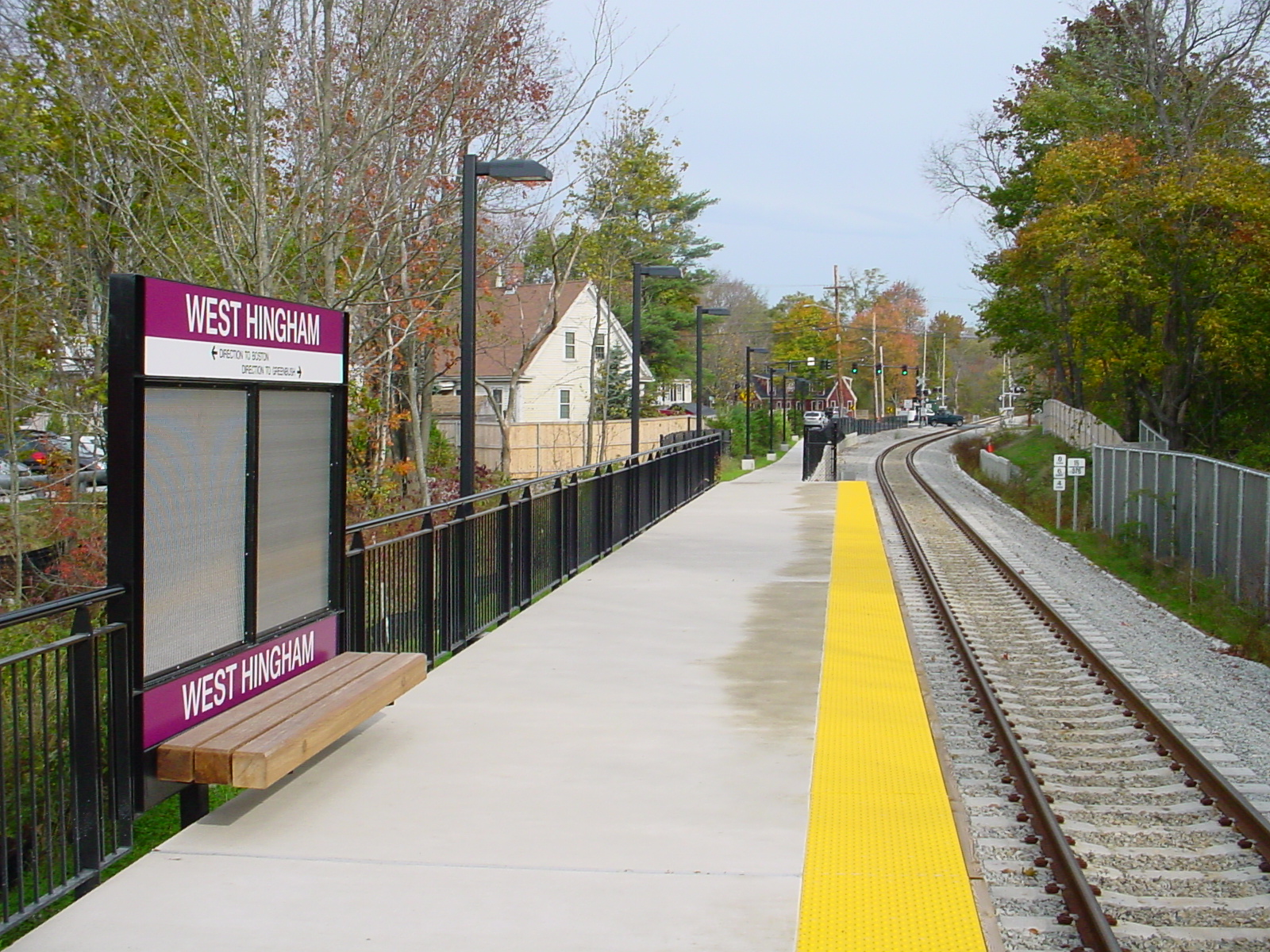
- West Hingham station in November 2007

General information
- Location: 20 Fort Hill Street; Hingham, Massachusetts
- Coordinates: 42°14′12.12″N 70°54′11.16″W
- Line: Greenbush Branch
- Platforms: 1 side platform
- Tracks: 1

Construction
- Parking: 214 spaces
- Accessible: Yes

Other information
- Fare zone: 3

History
- Opened: October 31, 2007
- Closed: June 30, 1959

Passengers
- 2024: 167 daily boardings

Services
Preceding station	MBTA	Following station
East Weymouth toward South Station	Greenbush Line	Nantasket Junction toward Greenbush
Former services
Preceding station	New York, New Haven and Hartford Railroad	Following station
East Weymouth toward Boston	South Shore Line	Hingham toward Greenbush
Location

West Hingham station is an MBTA Commuter Rail station in Hingham, Massachusetts. It serves the Greenbush Line. It consists of a single side platform serving the line's single track. The station is fully accessible.

== History ==
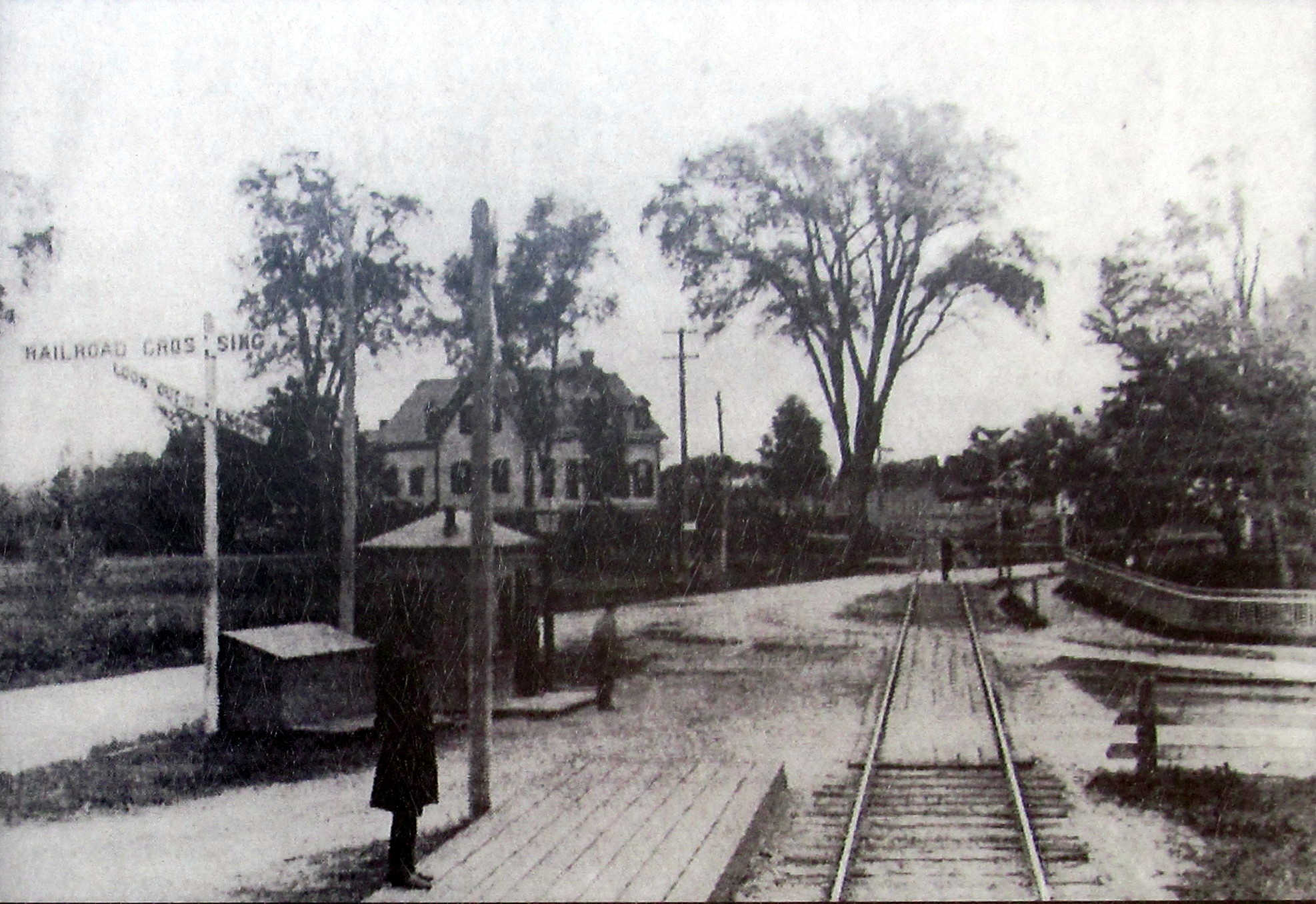
The West Hingham station platform and South Street grade crossing in 1889

The South Shore Railroad opened between Braintree and Cohasset on January 1, 1849. A station at West Hingham opened by 1867. It was located north of the South Street level crossing. The South Shore Railroad was acquired by the Old Colony Railroad in 1877; the Old Colony was in turn acquired by the New York, New Haven and Hartford Railroad in 1893.

The New Haven Railroad abandoned its remaining Old Colony Division lines on June 30, 1959, after the completion of the Southeast Expressway.

The MBTA reopened the Greenbush Line on October 31, 2007, with West Hingham station located south of South Street where room for a parking lot was available. A downtown Hingham station was not possible due to the narrow tunnel constructed to avoid level crossings in Hingham Square, so West Hingham and Nantasket Junction stations both serve Hingham.

Solar panels were installed over the parking lot in 2018 – one of the first three of a planned 37 such installations at MBTA parking lots – though activation was delayed by a dispute between the MBTA and the utility over liability.
