= Nantasket Junction station =

Railway station in Hingham, Massachusetts

Nantasket Junction
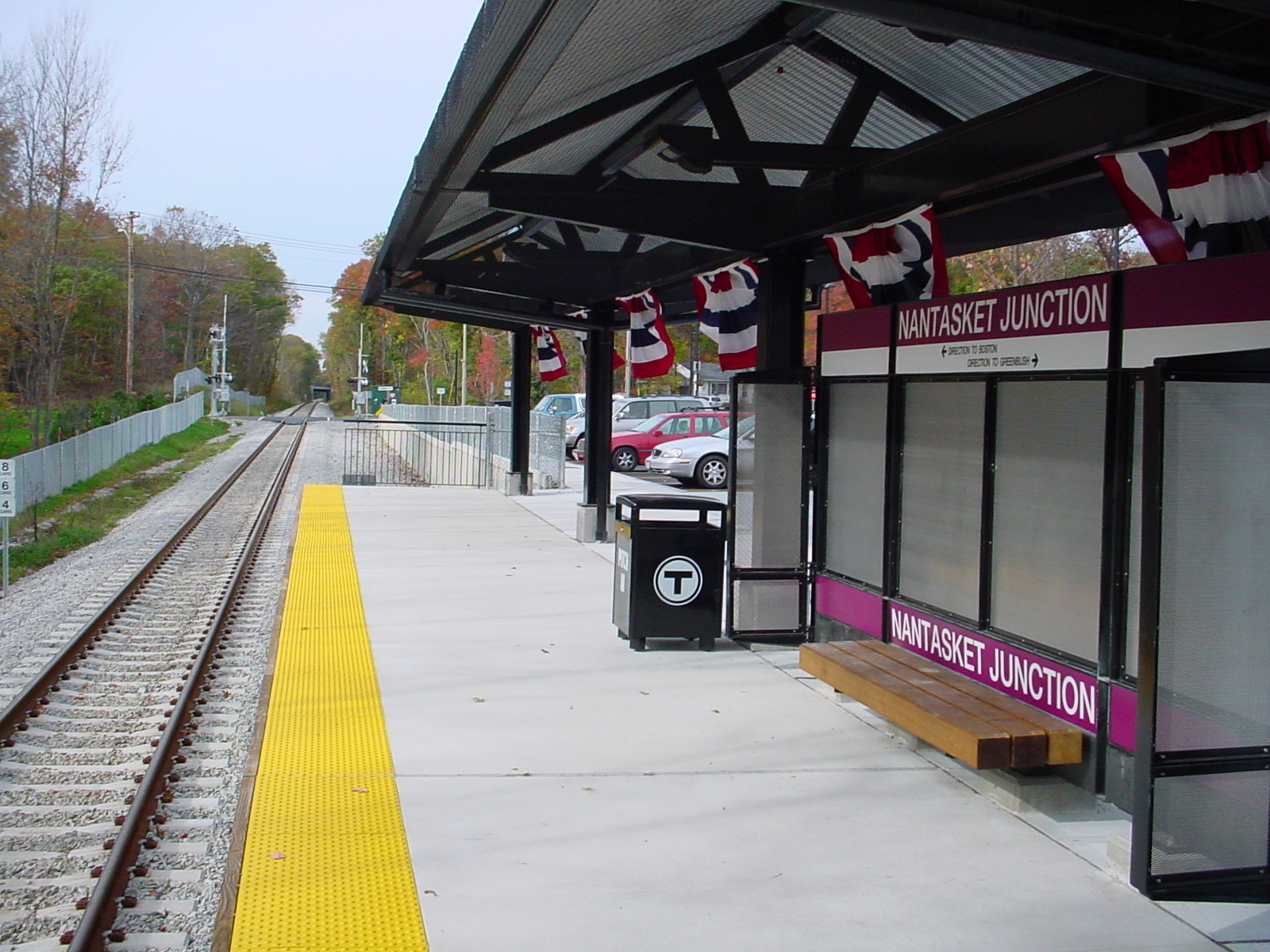
- Nantasket Junction station in November 2007

General information
- Location: 190 Summer Street; Hingham, Massachusetts
- Coordinates: 42.24498°N 70.86831°W
- Lines: Greenbush Branch; Nantasket Beach Branch (former)
- Platforms: 1 side platform
- Tracks: 1
- Connections: MBTA bus: 714

Construction
- Parking: 495 spaces ($4.00 fee)
- Accessible: Yes

Other information
- Fare zone: 4

History
- Opened: October 31, 2007
- Closed: June 30, 1959 (previous station)
- Former names: Old Colony House (until c. 1880)

Passengers
- 2024: 120 daily boardings

Services
Preceding station	MBTA	Following station
West Hingham toward South Station	Greenbush Line	Cohasset toward Greenbush
Former services
Preceding station	New York, New Haven and Hartford Railroad	Following station
Hingham toward Boston	South Shore Line	North Cohasset toward Greenbush
Terminus	Nantasket Beach Branch	Weir River toward Pemberton
Location

Nantasket Junction station is an MBTA Commuter Rail station in Hingham, Massachusetts. It serves the Greenbush Line. It is located off Chief Justice Cushing Highway east of downtown Hingham. It consists of a single side platform serving the line's one track. The station is fully accessible.

== History ==
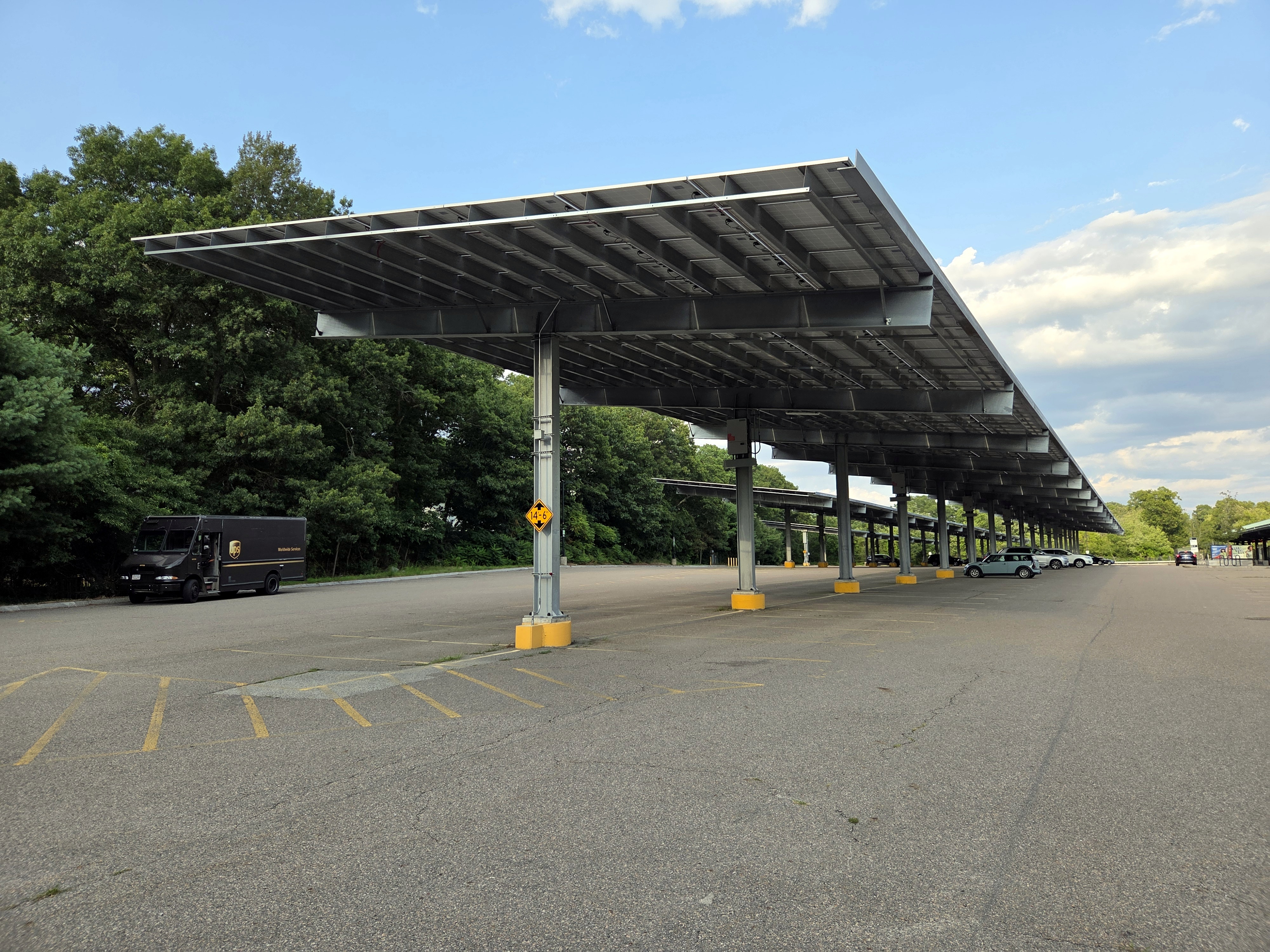
The 2018-installed solar panels

The South Shore Railroad opened between Braintree and Cohasset on January 1, 1849. A station at Old Colony House, serving the nearby hotel of the same name, opened by 1854. It was later renamed Nantasket Junction when the Nantasket Beach Railroad opened. The South Shore Railroad was acquired by the Old Colony Railroad in 1877; the Old Colony was in turn acquired by the New York, New Haven and Hartford Railroad in 1893. By 1903, the station was located at Summer Street where the Nantasket Beach Branch met the South Shore mainline.

The New Haven abandoned its remaining Old Colony Division lines on June 30, 1959, after the completion of the Southeast Expressway.

The MBTA reopened the Greenbush Line on October 31, 2007, with Nantasket Junction station located at the former station site. The parking lot is located on the land formerly inside the wye. Solar panels were installed over the parking lot in 2018 – one of the first three of a planned 37 such installations at MBTA parking lots – though activation was delayed by a dispute between the MBTA and the utility over liability.
