= Scituate =

Scituate is the name of some communities in New England in the United States:

- Brunswick, Maine, formerly named Scituate
- Scituate, Massachusetts, a New England town
  - Scituate (CDP), Massachusetts, an area in the town of Scituate
- Scituate, Rhode Island, named after the town in Massachusetts

== See also ==
- North Scituate (disambiguation)
- Scituate High School (disambiguation)
