= North Scituate station =

Railway station in Scituate, Massachusetts

North Scituate
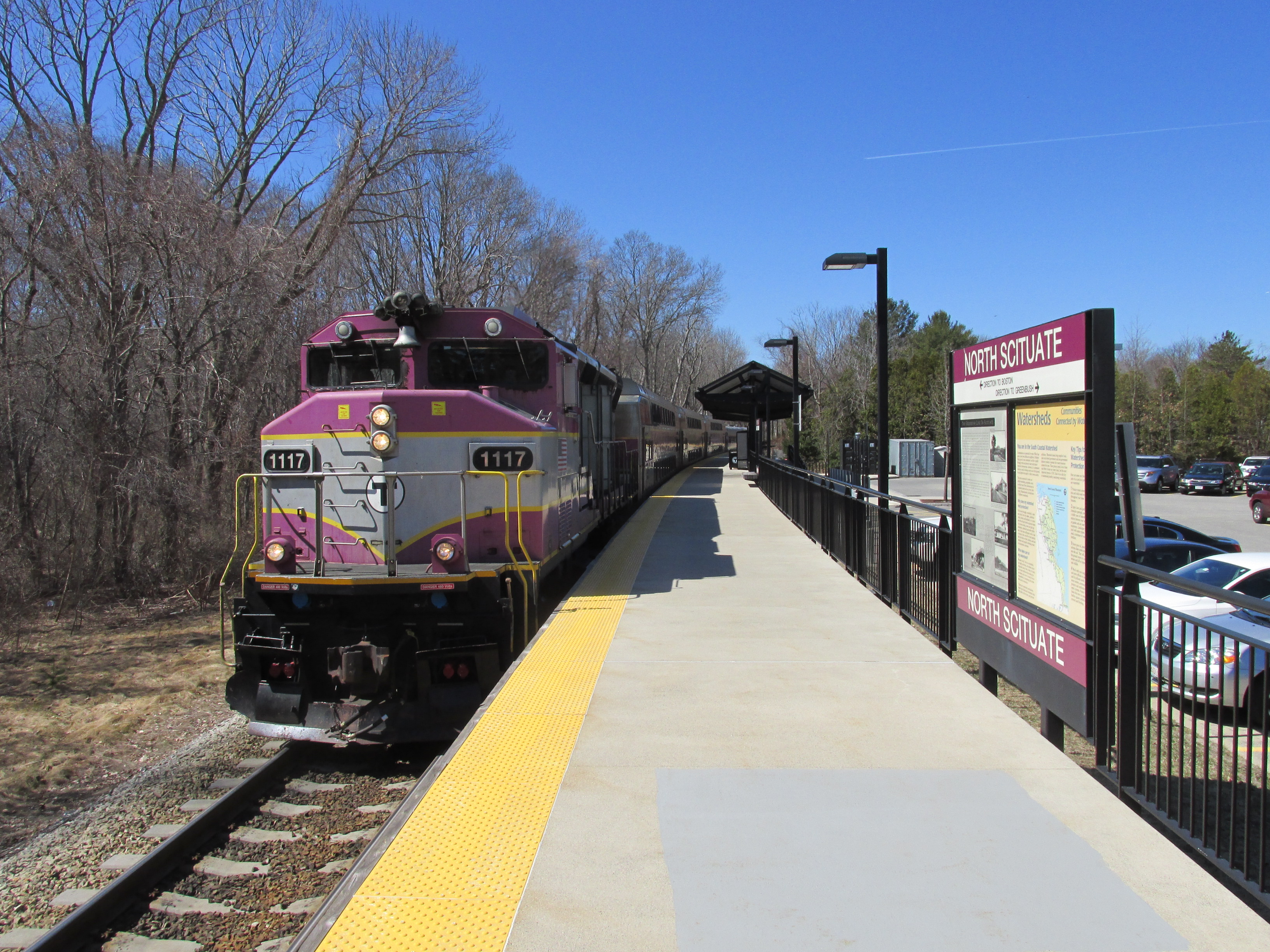
- An outbound train at North Scituate station in 2013

General information
- Location: 777 Country Way; Scituate, Massachusetts
- Coordinates: 42.21978°N 70.78904°W
- Line: Greenbush Branch
- Platforms: 1 side platform
- Tracks: 1

Construction
- Parking: 281 spaces ($4.00 fee)
- Accessible: Yes

Other information
- Fare zone: 5

History
- Opened: October 31, 2007
- Closed: June 30, 1959

Passengers
- 2024: 153 daily boardings

Services
Preceding station	MBTA	Following station
Cohasset toward South Station	Greenbush Line	Greenbush Terminus
Former services
Preceding station	New York, New Haven and Hartford Railroad	Following station
Beachwood toward Boston	South Shore Line	Egypt toward Greenbush
Location

North Scituate station is an MBTA Commuter Rail station in Scituate, Massachusetts. It serves the Greenbush Line. The station, located at 777 Country Way in North Scituate village, is the primary station for Scituate, while nearby Greenbush station primarily serves as a park-and-ride for adjacent communities. Like the other stations on the Greenbush Line, North Scituate consists of a single full-length high-level platform which provides accessible boarding to the line's single track.

== History ==
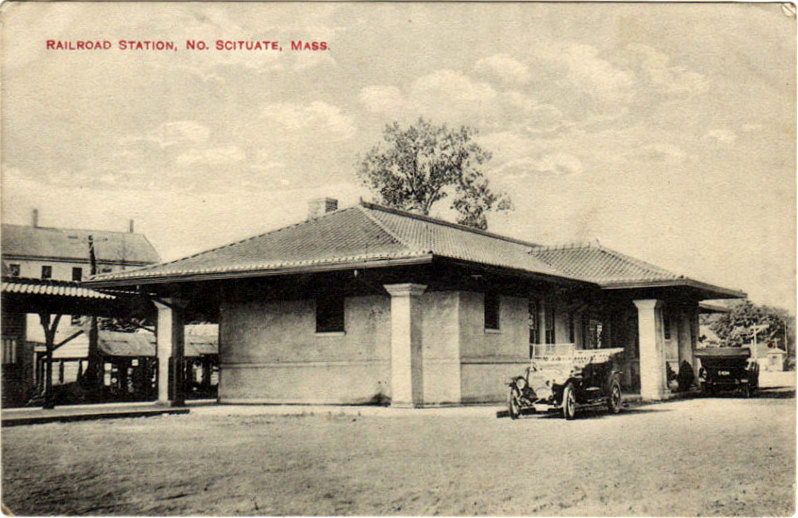
North Scituate station on a 1912 postcard

The modern Greenbush Line was originally built as the South Shore Railroad, which opened to Cohasset in 1849. The Old Colony-backed Duxbury and Cohasset Railroad, chartered in 1867, which opened from Cohasset to Duxbury in 1871, including a stop at North Scituate. Three other stations were, at various times, located in Scituate: Egypt station at Captain Pierce Road, Scituate (also called Scituate Harbor) at First Parish Road, and Greenbush at Driftway.

After financial troubles in the 1870s, the Duxbury and Cohasset was joined with the South Shore under the fold of the Old Colony Railroad in 1877. A new freight house was built in 1879, and the existing passenger station was expanded. The Old Colony was leased to the New York, New Haven, and Hartford Railroad in 1893.

Ridership on the Greenbush Line diminished in the 1930s due to increased competition from automobiles. The line enjoyed a brief uptick in traffic in World War II with the construction of the Hingham Naval Ammunition Depot and the Hingham Naval Ammunition Depot Annex. The number of daily trips was increased from 4 to 8 after World War II under Frederick C. Dumaine, Jr., and modern diesel trains including Budd RDCs were introduced in the 1950s. However, the New Haven Railroad continued to lose money on the service, and after Dumaine was ousted the railroad announced all trains would cease running in 1958. Only an emergency subsidy by the state kept trains running until June 30, 1959 when the Southeast Expressway opened and all passenger train service ended. The former Spanish-style station, built in 1908-09, is located on Gannett Road near the modern station. It was converted for commercial use by 1962.

Calls for the former Old Colony lines to be reactivated began in the 1980s; the Plymouth/Kingston Line and Middleborough/Lakeville Line were reopened in 1997. After much controversy surrounding various aspects of the $534 million project, construction of the Greenbush Line was completed in mid-2007. The Greenbush line and North Scituate station were opened for full service on October 31, 2007 after a ceremonial train the previous day.
