= North Scituate Beach =

Beach in Massachusetts, United States

Coordinates: 42°14′00″N 70°45′28″W

North Scituate Beach is a beach in North Scituate, Massachusetts.
