= North Scituate =

North Scituate is the name of several places in the United States:

- North Scituate, Massachusetts
  - North Scituate (MBTA station)
- Smithville-North Scituate historic district in Scituate, Rhode Island
