= Greenbush Line =

MBTA Commuter Rail line

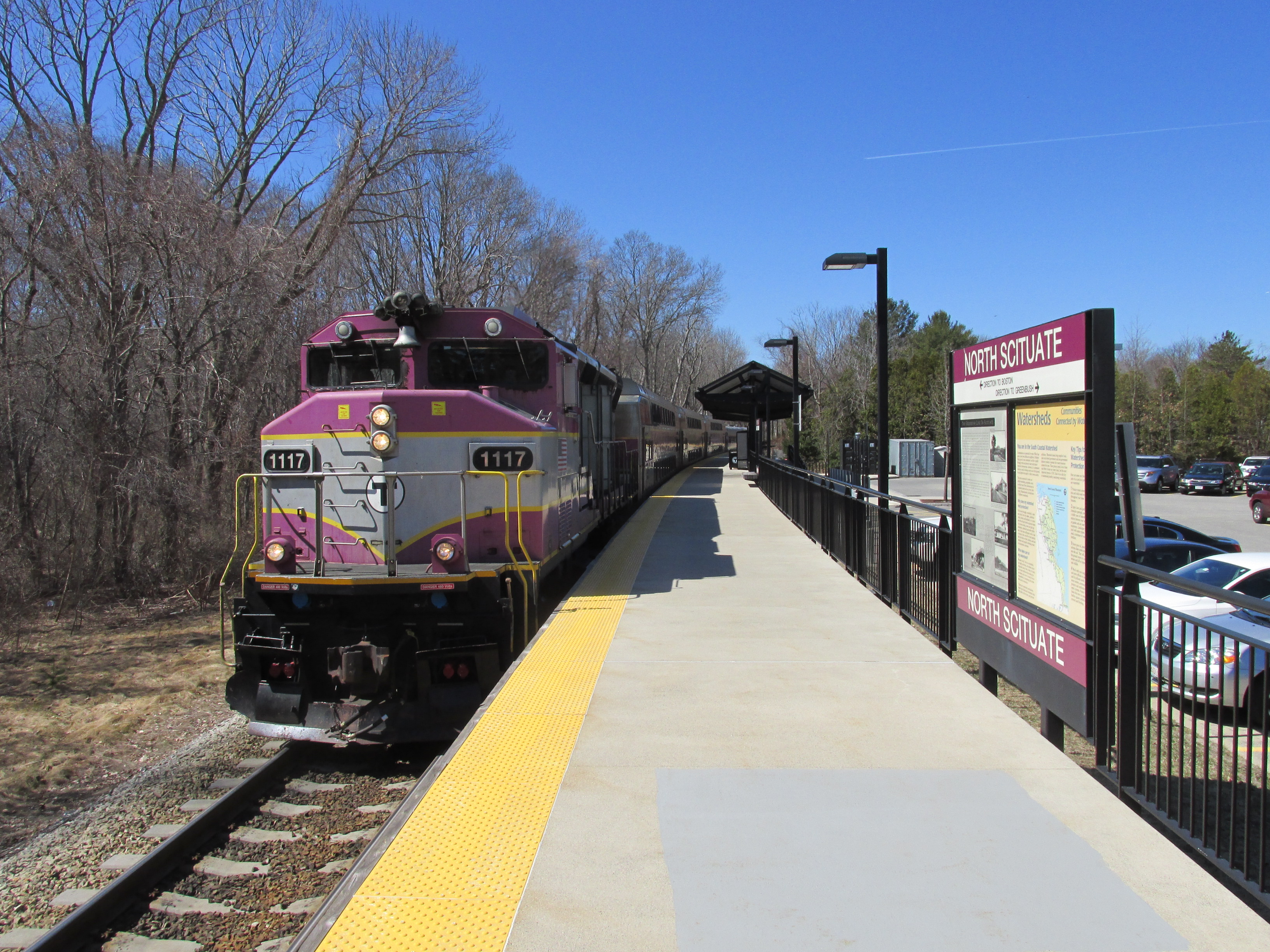
- An outbound train at North Scituate station in April 2013

Overview
- Status: Operating
- Owner: MBTA
- Locale: Southeastern Massachusetts
- Termini: Boston South Station; Greenbush
- Stations: 10

Service
- Type: Commuter rail line
- System: Massachusetts Bay Transportation Authority
- Train number(s): 8401–8424 (weekdays); 8901–8916 (weekends)
- Operator: Keolis North America
- Daily ridership: 3,741 (2024)

History
- Opened: October 31, 2007
- Closed: June 30, 1959 (previous NYNH&H service)

Technical
- Line length: 27.6 miles (44.4 km)
- Character: Surface level with one tunnel
- Track gauge: 4 ft 8 1/2 in (1,435 mm)

The Greenbush Line is a branch of the MBTA Commuter Rail system which serves the South Shore region of Massachusetts. The 27.6-mile (44.4 km) line runs from downtown Boston, Massachusetts through the cities and towns of Quincy, Braintree, Weymouth, Hingham, Cohasset, and Scituate to the Greenbush neighborhood in southern Scituate. There are ten stations along the line. From South Station to northern Braintree, Greenbush Line service shares the Old Colony Main Line with the Fall River/New Bedford Line and Kingston Line. From Braintree to Greenbush, trains utilize the Greenbush Branch, the former South Shore Railroad line that was later incorporated into the Old Colony Railroad.

Modern passenger service on the Greenbush Line began on October 31, 2007. This service restoration, put in place as environmental mitigation for the Big Dig project, was the first passenger service on the line since 1959.

== History ==
=== South Shore Railroad and Old Colony Railroad ===
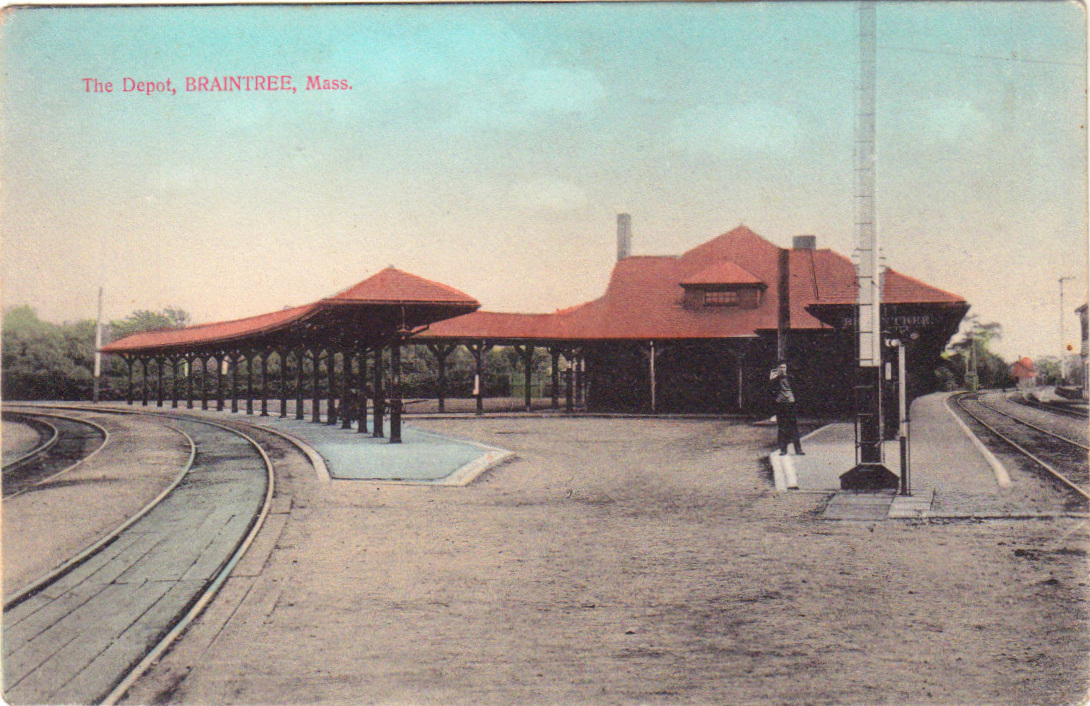
Former Braintree station, where the South Shore (left) separated from the Old Colony. The modern Braintree station is located a mile to the south along the Old Colony mainline.

Before passenger train service stopped in 1959, commuter trains had been using parts of the Greenbush line for over 100 years. Train service was first started by the South Shore Railroad which was chartered in March 1846 to build a branch off the Old Colony Railroad at Braintree. It opened to Cohasset on January 1, 1849, running three round trips per day with Old Colony equipment. The South Shore separated from the Old Colony in 1854. The Old Colony-backed Duxbury and Cohasset Railroad, chartered in 1867, opened to South Duxbury in 1871 and to a junction with the Old Colony at Kingston in 1874. After an economic collapse in the 1870s, the Old Colony acquired the South Shore in 1877 and the Duxbury and Cohasset in 1878 and combined them as the South Shore Line.

The Nantasket Beach Railroad opened in 1880 from Nantasket Junction to the Pemberton section of Hull in 1880 and joined the Old Colony in 1881. After closing in 1886, it reopened in 1888. A second track was added to the South Shore Line in 1890 from Braintree to Nantasket Junction to support Nantasket Beach service.

In March 1893, the Old Colony Railroad and all its trackage, including the South Shore Line and the Nantasket Beach Branch, were taken over by the New York, New Haven and Hartford Railroad.

=== The New Haven and service cuts ===
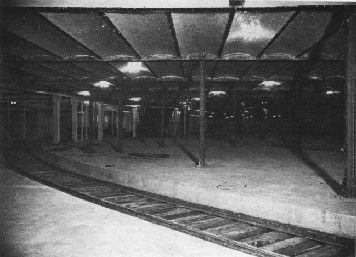
Lower-level loop platforms at South Station, built for planned electrified service on the South Shore Line and other commuter lines

The New Haven had plans to electrify some southside commuter lines, and some infrastructure was built, including lower-level loop platforms at South Station. However, the only electrification that actually took place was on the South Shore and Nantasket Beach lines. The Nantasket Beach line was electrified in 1895, and trolley service ran on the line until 1932. Between 1896 and 1899, the South Shore was electrified from Braintree to Cohasset, with an unusual center-of-the-track third rail. However, the third rail was dangerous at grade crossings, and the South Shore returned to steam-only service in 1902.

The double track was extended to Greenbush station in Scituate by 1911, and the station was used as the terminus for many short turn commuter trains. In 1911, service on the line included 8 trains to Plymouth via Kingston, 5 Greenbush short-turns, and 9 Cohasset short-turns.

Under the control of the New Haven Railroad, the South Shore Line and others set all-time records for number of passengers. The popularity of the train was short-lived, however. Cutbacks in service due to World War I were not reversed afterwards, due to the increasing usage of the automobile. The New Haven Railroad went bankrupt in 1935 and only kept a few passenger trains running because of a court order directing it to do so. Service south of Greenbush, limited to a single South Duxbury round trip since 1932, was discontinued in 1939, after the 1938 New England hurricane damaged the causeway over the North River to Marshfield.

The railroad enjoyed a brief uptick in traffic in World War II with the construction of the Hingham Naval Ammunition Depot and the Hingham Naval Ammunition Depot Annex. The number of daily trips was increased from 4 to 8 after World War II under Frederick C. Dumaine, Jr., and modern diesel trains including Budd RDCs were introduced in the 1950s. However, the New Haven Railroad continued to lose money on the service, and after Dumaine was ousted the railroad announced all trains would cease running in 1958. Only an emergency subsidy by the state kept trains running until June 30, 1959 when the Southeast Expressway opened and all passenger train service ended. Freight trains continued to use the line as far south as the Hingham Lumber Yard located, where the Nantasket Junction station now exists, until 1979. All service was terminated in 1983.

=== Restoration of service and controversy ===
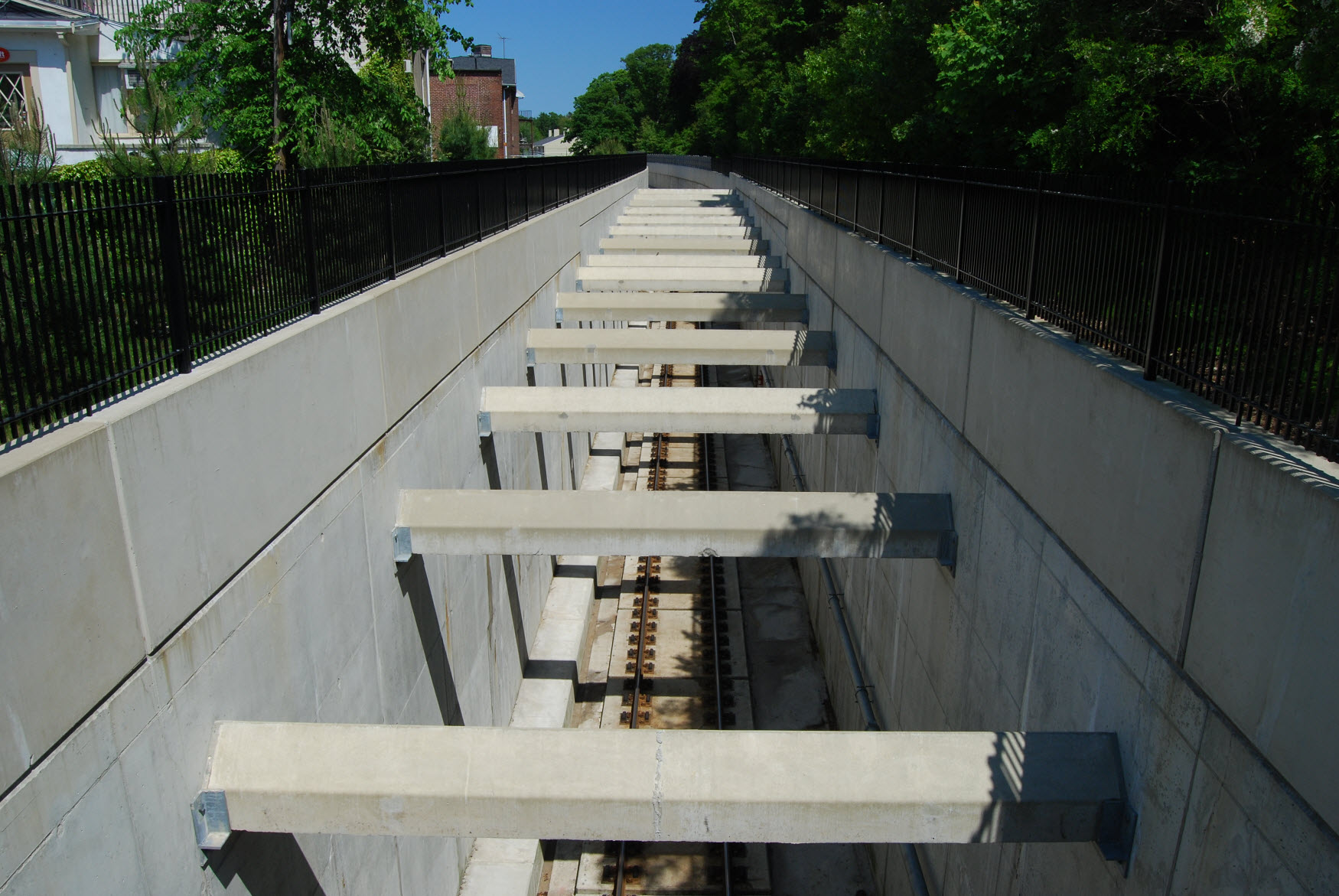
The trenched portion of the Greenbush Line through Hingham

During the early 1980s, officials from the South Shore area began speaking in support of the restoration of passenger rail service in the area; in 1985, then-Governor Michael Dukakis voiced support for the proposals. In 1990, as part of environmental mitigation for the Big Dig project, both the Greenbush and Old Colony Lines were submitted to the federal government in order to receive funding for the Big Dig. Both Old Colony lines were granted federal funds, but due to local opposition the state did not receive funds for the construction of the Greenbush Line. The Old Colony Lines were prioritized and opened in September 1997.

The Old Colony Lines saw continuous freight usage between 1959 and their restoration, but the freight traffic on the Greenbush Line had not run past Nantasket Junction since 1963 (except for some freight traffic to the Hingham Naval Ammunition Depot Annex between 1967 and 1972) and West Hingham since 1979. In 1983, all freight traffic on the line except to the Fore River Railroad ceased. The line was abandoned; with brush covering rusted-out and missing rails. Because residents had gotten used to the line being abandoned, there was more resistance to the Greenbush line being restored than for the Old Colony Lines. The Greenbush Line has 28 grade crossings on the 18 miles of track from Greenbush to where it meets the Old Colony mainline, promoting safety concerns from residents and causing the MBTA to roll out a major public safety campaign.

Residents of some communities also opposed restoration of service on the Greenbush branch on the grounds that it would increase noise levels and aesthetically mar the neighborhoods through which the new rail service was to run. Concerns were also raised about traffic jams being created at the grade crossings while the gates were down for trains to pass. Partially as a result of extensive litigation, the MBTA then worked with the towns along the Greenbush route to enact several measures to mitigate the environmental impact of the restored train service. These included constructing an 890-foot (270 m) long tunnel costing $40 million under downtown Hingham, another trenched underpass at Weymouth Landing, and the soundproofing of homes and businesses located near the railroad tracks. Ultimately, the legal and political delays and ensuing mitigation delayed the opening of the line for many years and resulted in a greatly increased cost. The line eventually cost $534 million—equal to the cost of the two Old Colony Lines branches combined.

The extension of MBTA commuter rail service was intended to reduce congestion along the Southeast Expressway, Route 3 and Route 3A. The line was built with 3,100 parking spaces, and was eventually expected to provide 8,600 one-way rides daily, diverting approximately 5,000 of those trips from automobiles.

Construction of the line began in 2003 and major work was completed on February 6, 2007. The first test train ran on May 19, 2007. Testing of the signals along the line began in earnest in August 2007 in anticipation of opening the line later in the fall. Ceremonial trains were run on October 30, 2007, the day before the line opened for regular service. The front of MBTA locomotive #1052 was painted for the occasion.

=== MBTA service ===
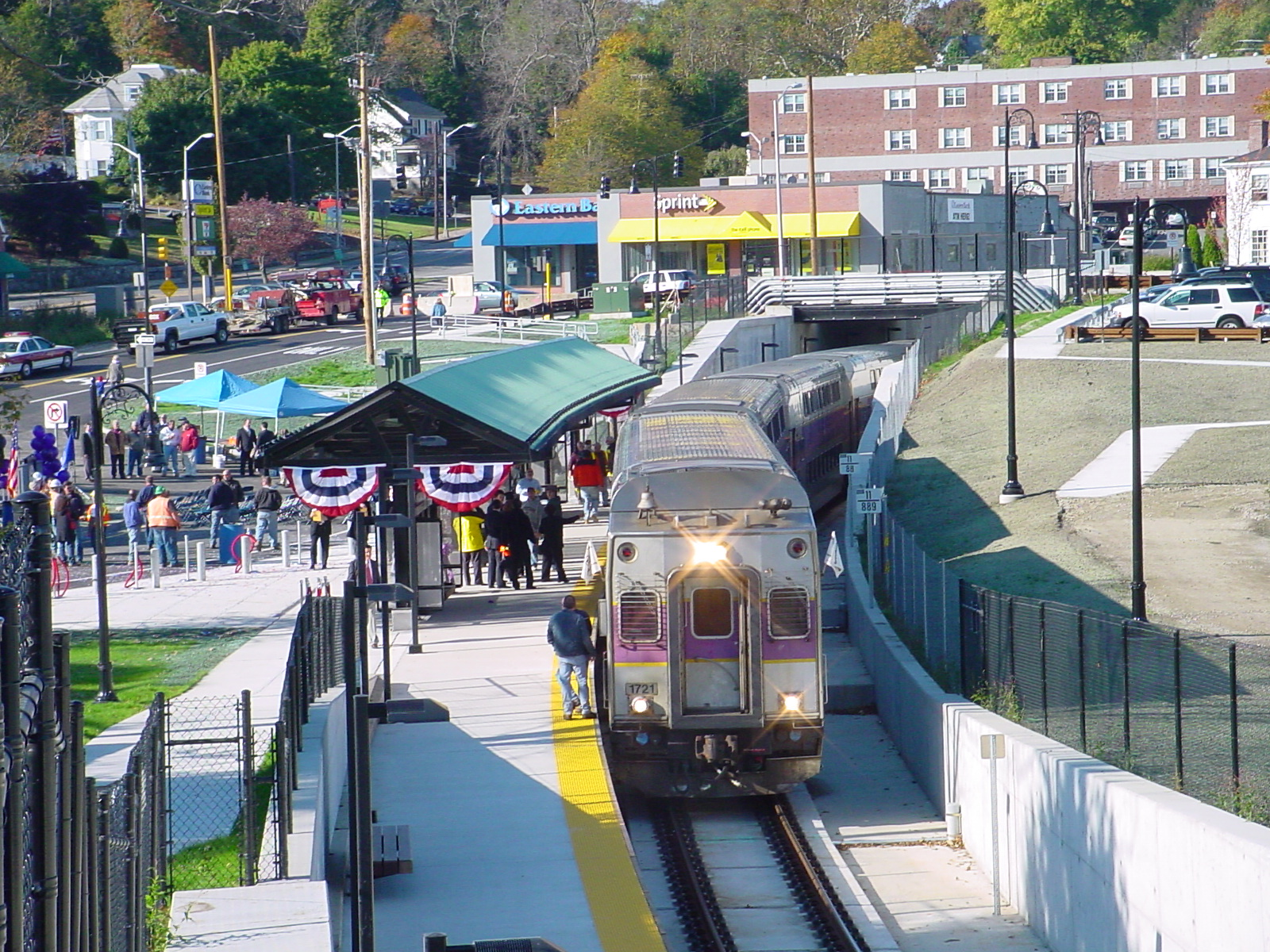
East Braintree/Weymouth Landing station during ceremonies on October 30, 2007

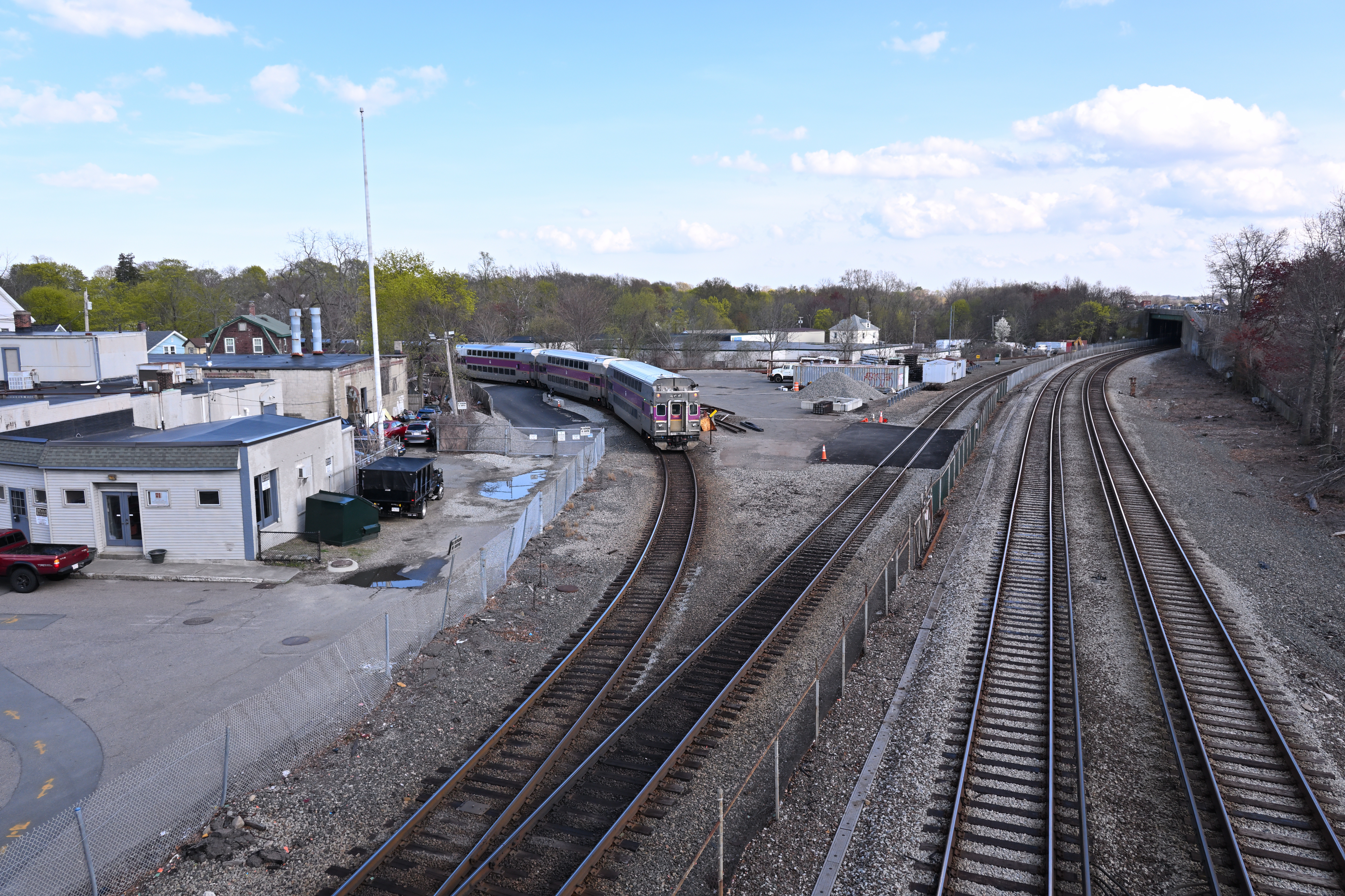
The former Braintree station location in 2025, where the Greenbush Branch (left) separates from the Middleborough Main Line

The Greenbush Line opened for regular passenger service on October 31, 2007, with 12 round trips on weekdays and 8 on weekends. Some minor construction projects, like the erection of fencing in populated areas, lasted into 2008. The 7 stations built for the line are similar in construction; each has a single 800-foot-long high-level side platform, serving a single track. Each station has 200 to 500 parking spaces, except for Greenbush, which houses 1000 spots in order to serve commuters driving from Hanover, Norwell, Marshfield, and Duxbury.

By 2010, despite predictions of 4,200 inbound passengers a day (or 8,400 total daily one-way trips) riding the train by three years after its opening, the MBTA said that ridership was only half that. The ridership numbers were down from 2009, when some 3,081 inbound riders (6,037 total trips) were recorded. These passengers were also more likely to have switched to the train from the MBTA commuter ferries, rather than the predicted car users. Ridership increased 40% between 2012 and 2018, with 6,114 total daily trips in a 2018 count.

Starting on April 30, 2011, weekend service was suspended to allow replacement of faulty concrete ties with wooden ties on the Old Colony mainline. The Greenbush branch itself, which was constructed with a different order of ties, did not need tie replacement. Weekend service resumed on December 24, 2011.

On March 28, 2012, the MBTA announced that Greenbush Line service would no longer operate on weekends, as with the Needham Line and Plymouth/Kingston Line. The move came as a part of fare increases and service cuts in order to close the agency's operating budget shortfall for the following year. Weekend service was eliminated beginning July 7, 2012; weekend service was kept for the first week of the new fiscal year to allow for service on the July 4th holiday. Weekend service on the Greenbush Line, as well as weekend service on the Plymouth/Kingston Line and Saturday service on the Needham Line, resumed on December 27, 2014.

Substantially reduced schedules due to the COVID-19 pandemic were in effect from March 16 to June 23, 2020, and from December 14, 2020, to April 5, 2021. On January 23, 2021, reduced schedules went into place with no weekend service on seven lines, including the Greenbush Line. Service changes on April 5, 2021, added midday service as part of a transition to a regional rail model. Weekend service on the Greenbush Line and the six other lines resumed on July 3, 2021. As of February 2022, the line has 13 round trips on weekdays and 8 on weekends. By October 2022, daily ridership was 2,691 riders; at 44% of pre-COVID ridership, this was the lowest recovery of the system's lines. By 2024, daily ridership was 3,741, making it the lowest-ridership line on the system. With the 2025 extension of the former Middleborough/Lakeville Line to Fall River and New Bedford causing scheduling conflicts and delays, off-peak and weekend stops at JFK/UMass were removed effective July 21, 2025 as a means to remedy on-time performance, leaving only peak-hour peak-direction stops.

== Station list ==
Fare zone	Location	Miles (km)	Station	Connections and notes
1A	Boston	0.0 (0.0)	South Station	Amtrak: Acela, Lake Shore Limited, Northeast Regional; MBTA Commuter Rail: Fairmount Line, Fall River/New Bedford Line, Framingham/Worcester Line, Franklin/Foxboro Line, Kingston Line, Needham Line, Providence/Stoughton Line; CapeFlyer (seasonal); MBTA subway: Red Line, Silver Line (SL1, SL2, SL3, SL4); MBTA bus: 4, 7, 11; Intercity buses at South Station Bus Terminal
1A	Boston	2.3 (3.7)	JFK/UMass	MBTA Commuter Rail: Fall River/New Bedford Line, Kingston Line; MBTA subway: Red Line; MBTA bus: 8, 16, 41; UMass Shuttle
1	Quincy	7.9 (12.7)	Quincy Center	MBTA Commuter Rail: Fall River/New Bedford Line, Kingston Line; MBTA subway: Red Line; MBTA bus: 210, 211, 215, 216, 217, 220, 222, 225, 230, 236, 238, 245
2	Weymouth	11.8 (19.0)	Weymouth Landing/East Braintree	MBTA bus: 225, 226
2	Weymouth	14.6 (23.5)	East Weymouth	
3	Hingham	16.2 (26.1)	West Hingham	
4	Hingham	18.3 (29.5)	Nantasket Junction	MBTA bus: 714
4	Cohasset	19.9 (32.0)	Cohasset	
5	Scituate	23.3 (37.5)	North Scituate	
6	Scituate	27.6 (44.4)	Greenbush	
