= North Scituate, Massachusetts =

- Census-designated place
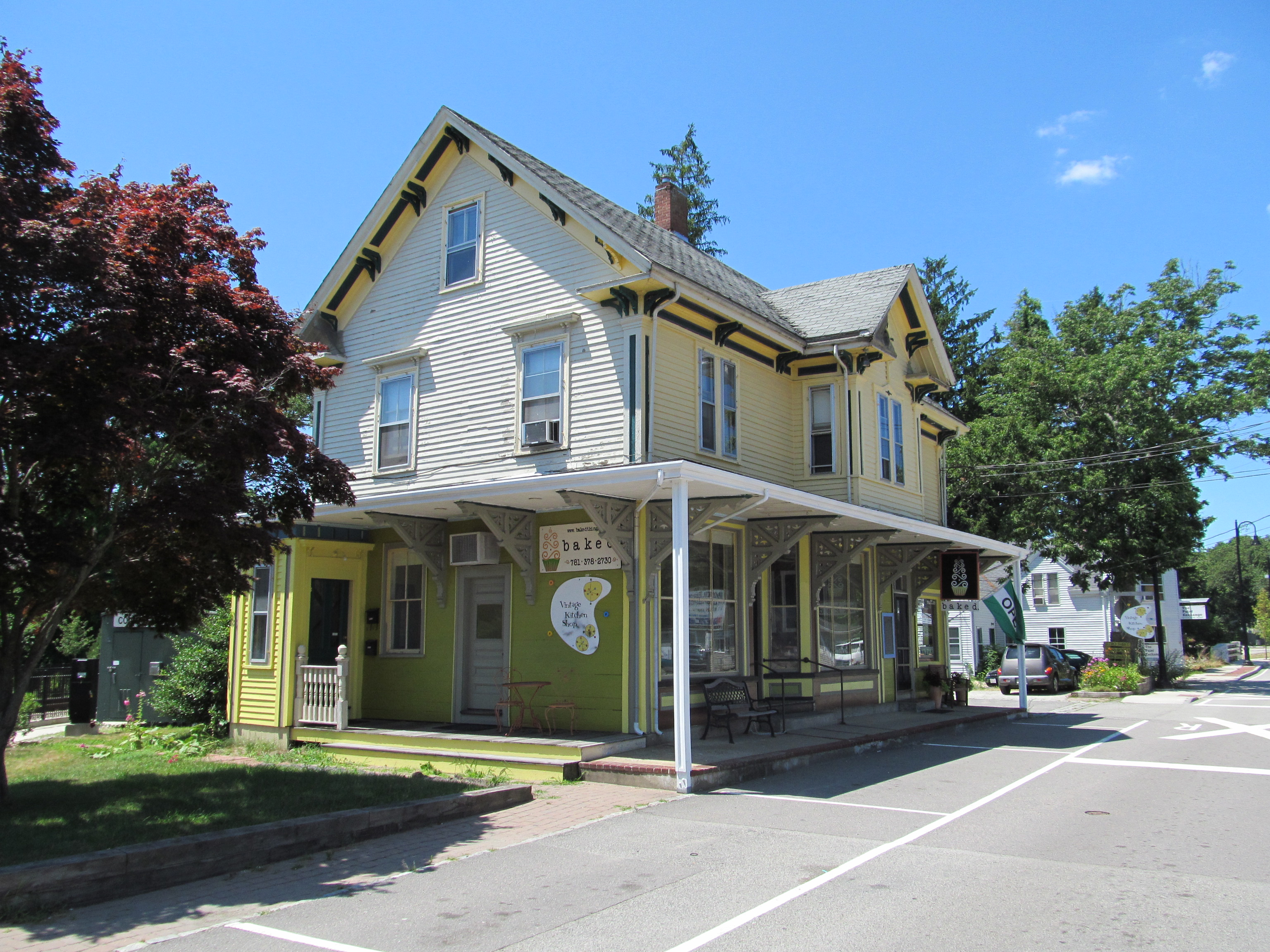
- A kitchen store in North Scituate

- Location in Plymouth County in Massachusetts
- Coordinates: 42°12′44″N 70°45′59″W
- Country: United States
- State: Massachusetts
- County: Plymouth

Area
  - Total: 3.81 sq mi (9.86 km^{2})
  - Land: 3.75 sq mi (9.71 km^{2})
  - Water: 0.058 sq mi (0.15 km^{2})
- Elevation: 13 ft (4 m)

Population (2020)
  - Total: 5,414
  - Density: 1,443.4/sq mi (557.31/km^{2})
- Time zone: UTC-5 (Eastern (EST))
  - Summer (DST): UTC-4 (EDT)
- ZIP code: 02060
- Area code: 781
- FIPS code: 25-49165
- GNIS feature ID: 0613848

North Scituate is a census-designated place (CDP) in the town of Scituate in Plymouth County, Massachusetts, United States. As of the 2020 census, North Scituate had a population of 5,414. It was formerly known as Gannet Corner.

== Geography ==
North Scituate is located at 42°12′44″N 70°45′59″W (42.212308, −70.766478).

According to the United States Census Bureau, the CDP has a total area of 10.1 km^{2} (3.9 mi^{2}), of which 10.0 km^{2} (3.9 mi^{2}) is land and 0.1 km^{2} (0.1 mi^{2}) (1.28%) is water.

The word "Scituate" is derived from the Native American word satuit, meaning "cold brook", referring to the river that runs into Scituate Harbor.

North Scituate has one freshwater pond, Hunter's Pond, which is fed by Bound Brook. Hunter's Pond flows into the saltwater Gulph River via a waterfall at Mordecai Lincoln Road.

Direct train service from North Scituate into Boston is available from North Scituate station on the Greenbush Line of MBTA Commuter Rail.

== Demographics ==
Historical population
Census	Pop.	Note	%±
2020	5,414		—
U.S. Decennial Census

=== 2020 census ===
As of the 2020 census, North Scituate had a population of 5,414. The median age was 43.8 years. 25.5% of residents were under the age of 18 and 18.9% of residents were 65 years of age or older. For every 100 females there were 91.8 males, and for every 100 females age 18 and over there were 89.2 males age 18 and over.

100.0% of residents lived in urban areas, while 0.0% lived in rural areas.

There were 1,957 households in North Scituate, of which 35.0% had children under the age of 18 living in them. Of all households, 65.4% were married-couple households, 9.9% were households with a male householder and no spouse or partner present, and 21.4% were households with a female householder and no spouse or partner present. About 21.8% of all households were made up of individuals and 14.3% had someone living alone who was 65 years of age or older.

There were 2,007 housing units, of which 2.5% were vacant. The homeowner vacancy rate was 0.5% and the rental vacancy rate was 1.2%.

Racial composition as of the 2020 census
Race	Number	Percent
White	5,130	94.8%
Black or African American	17	0.3%
American Indian and Alaska Native	1	0.0%
Asian	38	0.7%
Native Hawaiian and Other Pacific Islander	0	0.0%
Some other race	28	0.5%
Two or more races	200	3.7%
Hispanic or Latino (of any race)	92	1.7%

=== 2000 census ===
As of the census of 2000, there were 5,065 people, 1,849 households, and 1,432 families residing in the CDP. The population density was 505.3/km^{2} (1,310.4/mi^{2}). There were 1,901 housing units at an average density of 189.7/km^{2} (491.8/mi^{2}). The racial makeup of the CDP was 97.81% White, 0.22% African American, 0.04% Native American, 0.41% Asian, 0.04% Pacific Islander, 0.93% from other races, and 0.55% from two or more races. Hispanic or Latino of any race were 0.95% of the population.

There were 1,849 households, out of which 36.7% had children under the age of 18 living with them, 67.8% were married couples living together, 7.8% had a female householder with no husband present, and 22.5% were non-families. 19.9% of all households were made up of individuals, and 10.5% had someone living alone who was 65 years of age or older. The average household size was 2.74 and the average family size was 3.18.

In the CDP, the population was spread out, with 27.5% under the age of 18, 4.0% from 18 to 24, 27.0% from 25 to 44, 25.8% from 45 to 64, and 15.7% who were 65 years of age or older. The median age was 40 years. For every 100 females, there were 94.1 males. For every 100 females age 18 and over, there were 87.8 males.

The median income for a household in the CDP was $79,556, and the median income for a family was $92,074. (These figures had risen to $90,082 and $116,263 respectively as of a 2010 estimate). Males had a median income of $65,385 versus $43,839 for females. The per capita income for the CDP was $32,098. About 1.4% of families and 2.3% of the population were below the poverty line, including 0.8% of those under age 18 and 6.8% of those age 65 or over.
