= Cohasset, Massachusetts =

- Town
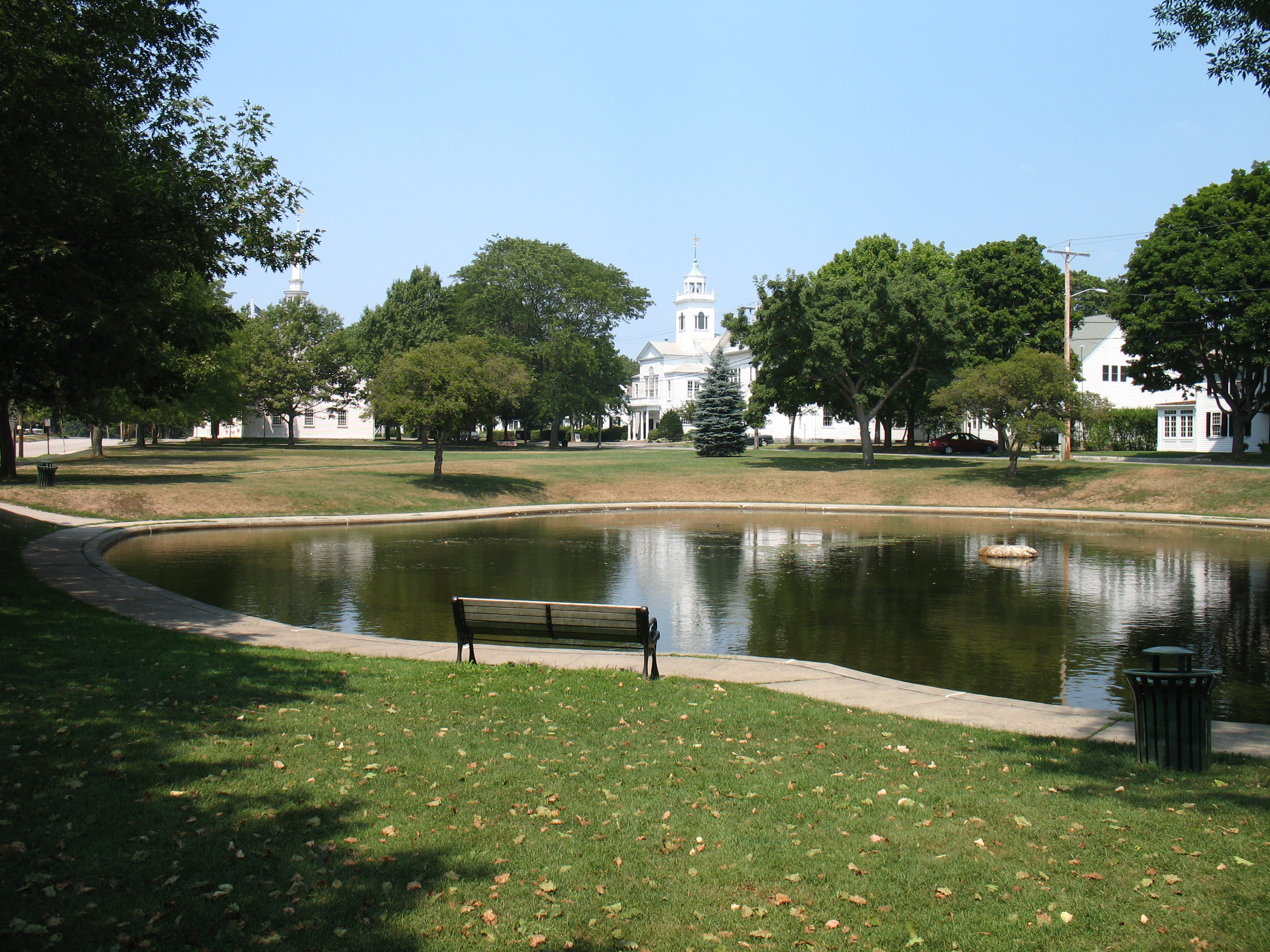
- Cohasset Town Common

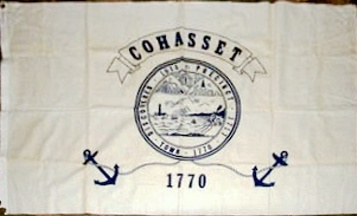
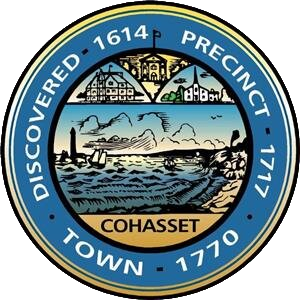
- Flag Seal

- Location as an exclave of Norfolk County in Massachusetts
- Coordinates: 42°14′30″N 70°48′15″W
- Country: United States
- State: Massachusetts
- County: Norfolk
- Settled: 1647
- Incorporated: 1770

Government
  - Type: Open town meeting

Area
  - Total: 31.44 sq mi (81.42 km^{2})
  - Land: 9.79 sq mi (25.35 km^{2})
  - Water: 21.64 sq mi (56.06 km^{2})
- Elevation: 49 ft (15 m)

Population
  - Total: 8,381
  - Density: 856/sq mi (330.6/km^{2})
- Time zone: UTC−5 (Eastern)
  - Summer (DST): UTC−4 (Eastern)
- ZIP Code: 02025
- Area code: 339/781
- FIPS code: 25-14640
- GNIS feature ID: 0618317
- Website: www.cohassetma.gov

Cohasset is a town in Norfolk County, Massachusetts, United States. The town, which split off from Hingham in 1770, derives its name from the Massachusett word "Conahasset". It is an exclave of Norfolk County. As of the 2020 census, the population was 8,381.

== History ==
In 1614, the area entered the written record, when Captain John Smith explored the coast of New England and described an encounter of his ship with four Native Americans in a canoe at Quonahasit, two of whom were shot by the Europeans. In 1634, "Conihosset" is listed as a "noted habitation" in New England in a list of both indigenous and colonial settlements. In 1649, Cohasset was inhabited by the Pokanoket, when it was conquered by the Wampanoag. In 1668, Cohasset was inhabited by the Wampanoag, when it was conquered by the Massachusett. In 1670, the area was first settled by English settlers, suggesting this was a settlement of Massachusett people. The town's name came from the Massachusett word "Conahasset," possibly meaning "long rocky place" or "fishing promontory."

Much of the land was originally granted without consultation of its indigenous inhabitants to the "Conahasset Partners." At a special town meeting of January 1670, the shares in the new town were apportioned and divided among the new proprietors, many of whom were large Hingham landowners. The largest number of shares (35) went to Hingham Town Clerk Daniel Cushing, with the second largest (25) to Reverend Peter Hobart, Hingham's minister. Others receiving large grants were: Capt. Joshua Hobart, Peter Hobart's brother (18 shares); Lieut. John Smith (15 shares); Ensign John Thaxter (16½ shares); and deacon John Leavitt (with 14½ shares). The layout of the town was distinctive. Many lots were laid out in long narrow strips, facilitating more lots with road frontage, and avoiding back lots.

In the 1600s, Quonohasset, today known as the town of Cohasset, was the eastern portion of the Town of Hingham. In 1713, those in Quonohasset petitioned to erect a second Meeting House for worship; it was granted and construction began. In 1770, Cohasset became a town separate from Hingham, 100 years after English settlement in the area began.

Cohasset was originally part of Suffolk County, and when the southern part of the county broke off as Norfolk County in 1793, it included the towns of Cohasset, Hingham and Hull. In 1803, Hull and Hingham opted out of Norfolk County and became part of Plymouth County, leaving Cohasset as an exclave of Norfolk County.

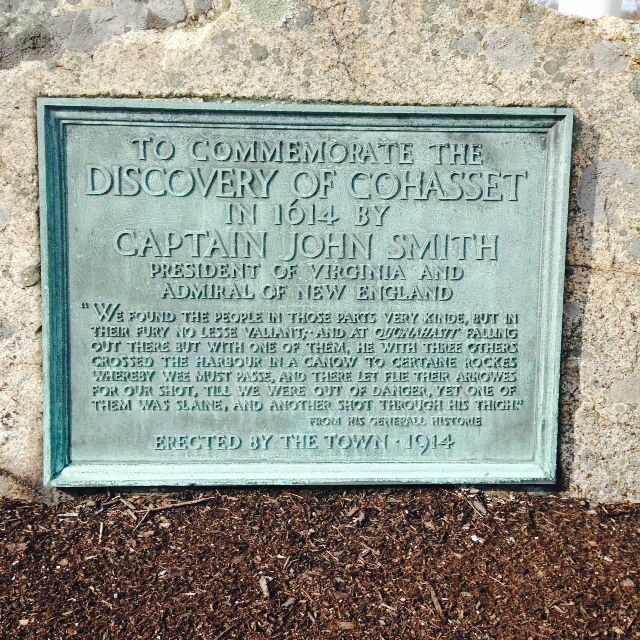
A historic marker on the discovery of Cohasset

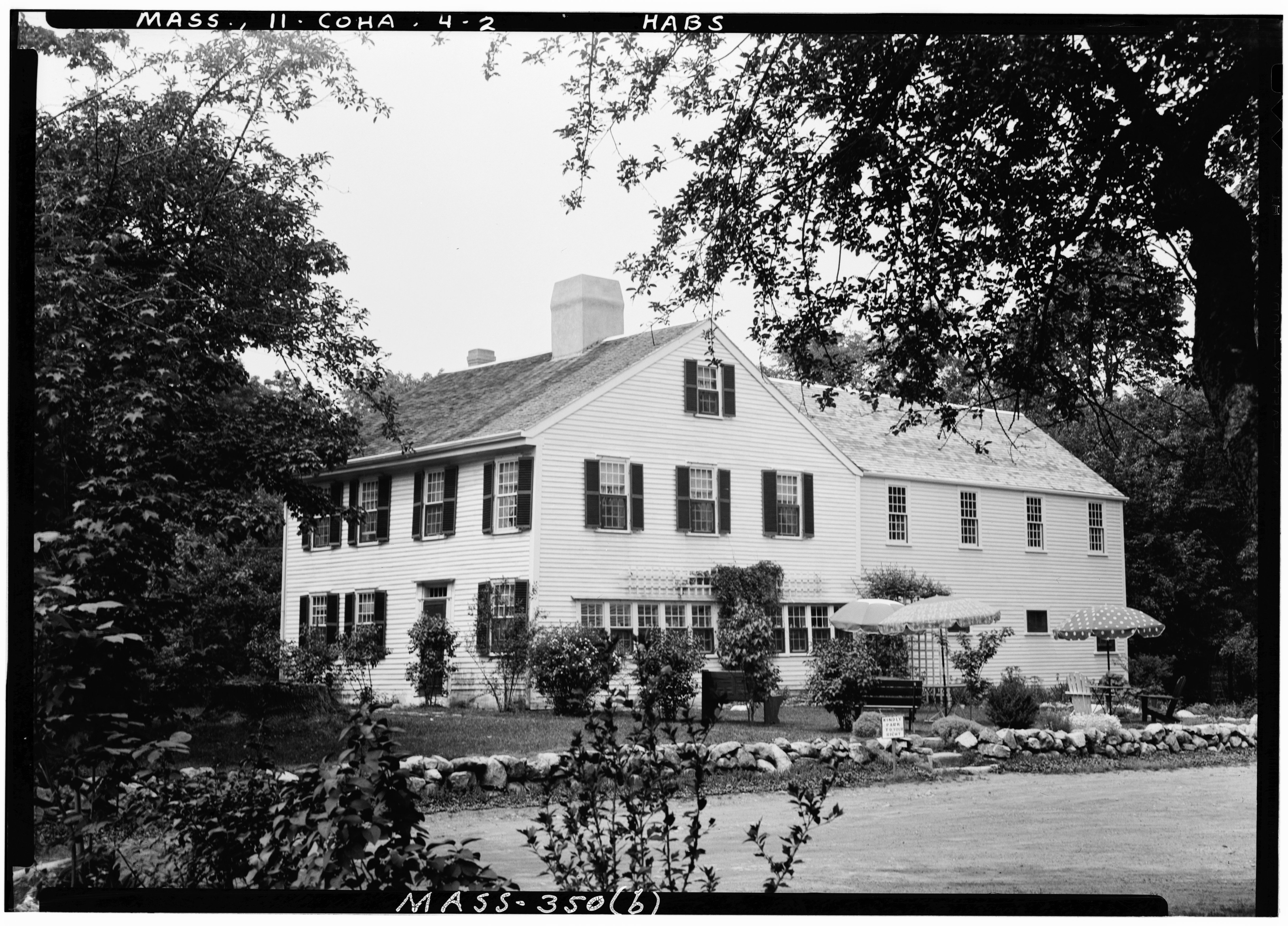
Cushing–Nichols House, Cohasset

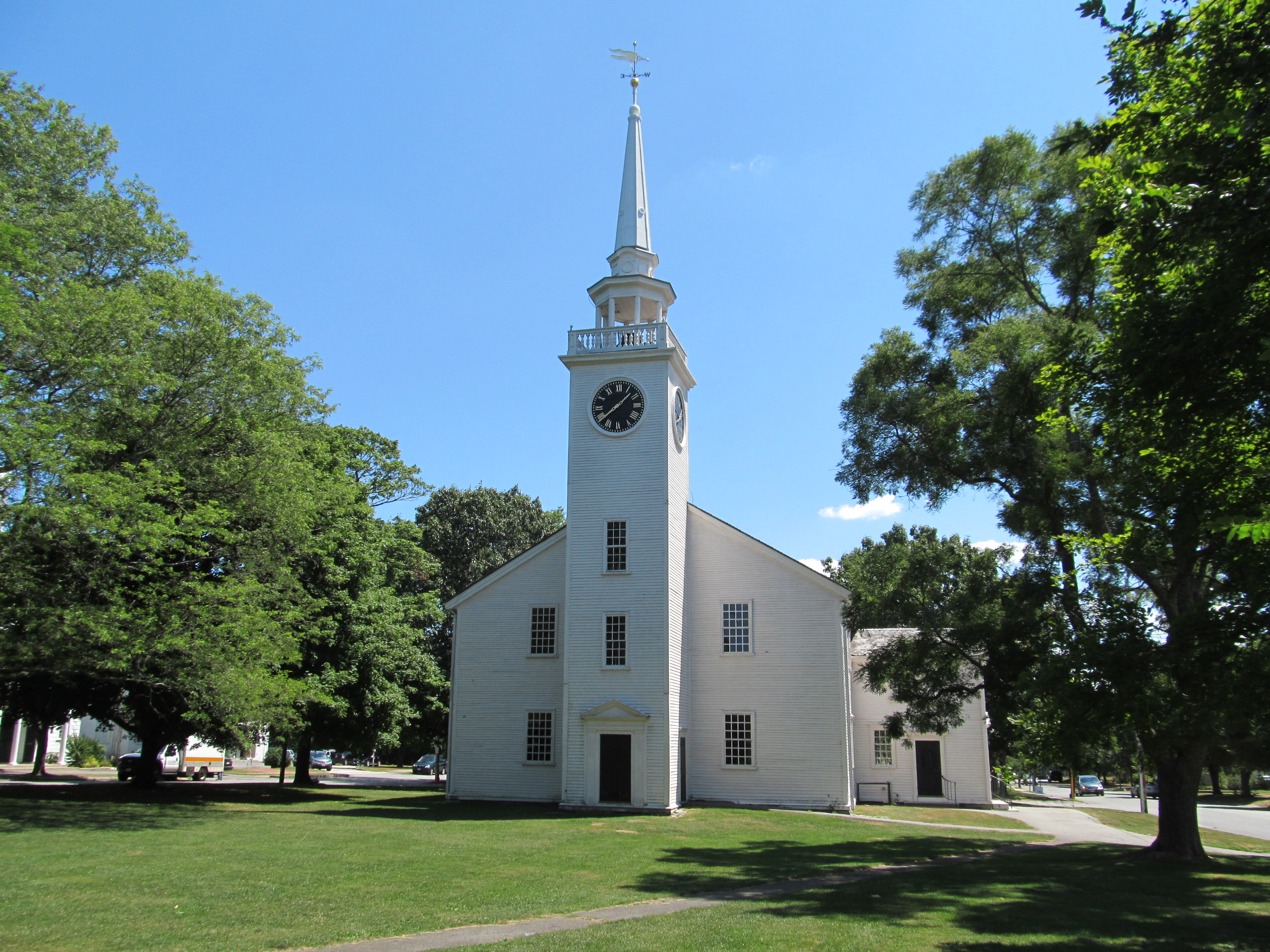
First Parish Meeting House, a Unitarian Universalist congregation originally built c. 1750.

== Geography ==
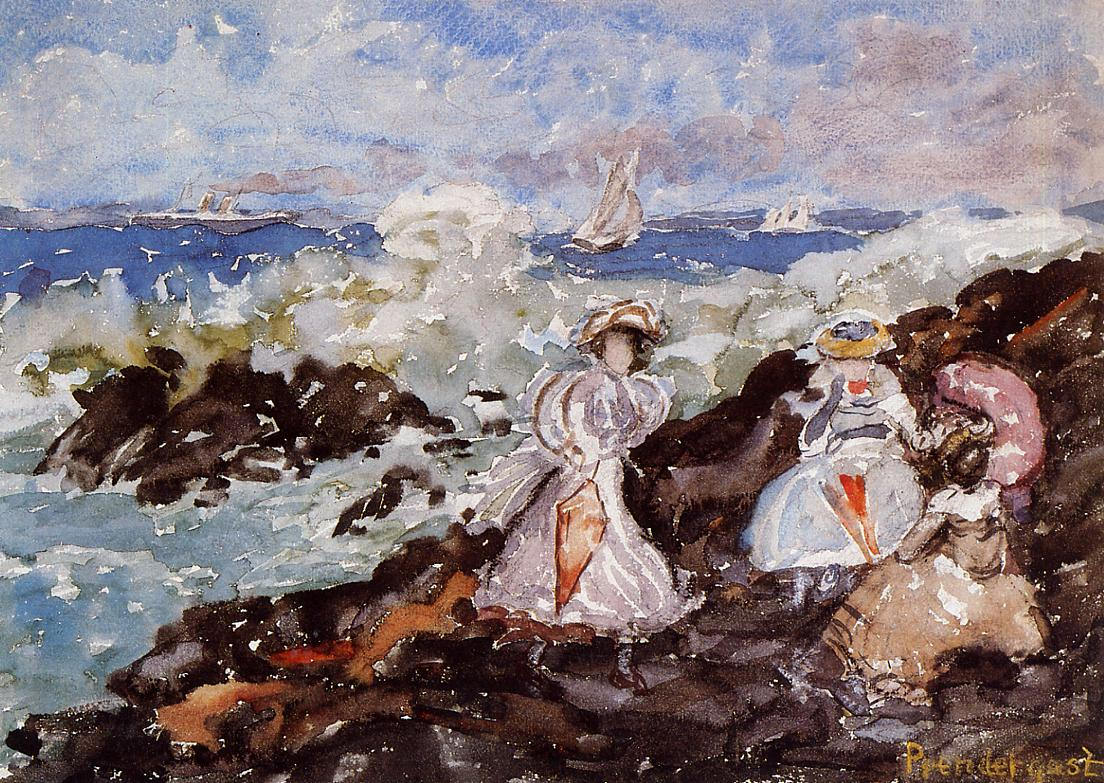
Surf, Cohasset, Maurice Prendergast, c. 1900

According to the United States Census Bureau, the town has a total area of 31.4 square miles (81.4 km^{2}), of which 9.8 square miles (25.4 km^{2}) are land and 21.7 square miles (56.1 km^{2}), or 68.86%, are water. It is bordered on the west by Hingham, on the northwest by Hull, on the north and northeast by Massachusetts Bay and on the east and south by Scituate. Cohasset is approximately 12 miles (19 km) east of Braintree and 20 miles (32 km) by road southeast of Boston.

Cohasset is located on the "corner" of the South Shore, where greater Boston Harbor ends and Massachusetts Bay begins. The shore is rocky, with many small ledges and rocks lying offshore. Cohasset Cove and The Gulf provide a long portion of the border with Scituate, while Straits Pond divides Cohasset from neighboring Hull. Near the center of the coast lies Little Harbor, a large inlet divided from the ocean by Beach Island. Several other brooks and rivers run through the town. A large portion of the southwestern part of town is occupied by Wompatuck State Park (formerly the Hingham Naval Ammunition Depot Annex), and the Whitney & Thayer Woods Reservation. There is also a bird sanctuary, as well as a large park (Wheelwright Park) near Little Harbor. There are three beaches along the bay, and the Cohasset Yacht Club, Cohasset Sailing Club and a public boat launch in Cohasset Harbor.

=== Climate ===
The climate in this area is characterized by hot, humid summers and generally mild to cool winters. According to the Köppen Climate Classification system, Cohasset has a humid subtropical climate, abbreviated "Cfa" on climate maps.

January is the coldest month of the year with an average low temperature of 20 °F and average high of 37 °F. July is the warmest month of the year with an average low temperature of 62 °F and average high of 81 °F. Average monthly precipitation falls between 3.47" and 4.80" depending on the time of year. Additionally, Cohasset averages 14.2" of snow in its snowiest month (February) and 48.3" for the year. The all-time record low and high temperatures are –13 °F (1961) and 100 °F (2002), respectively.

== Government ==
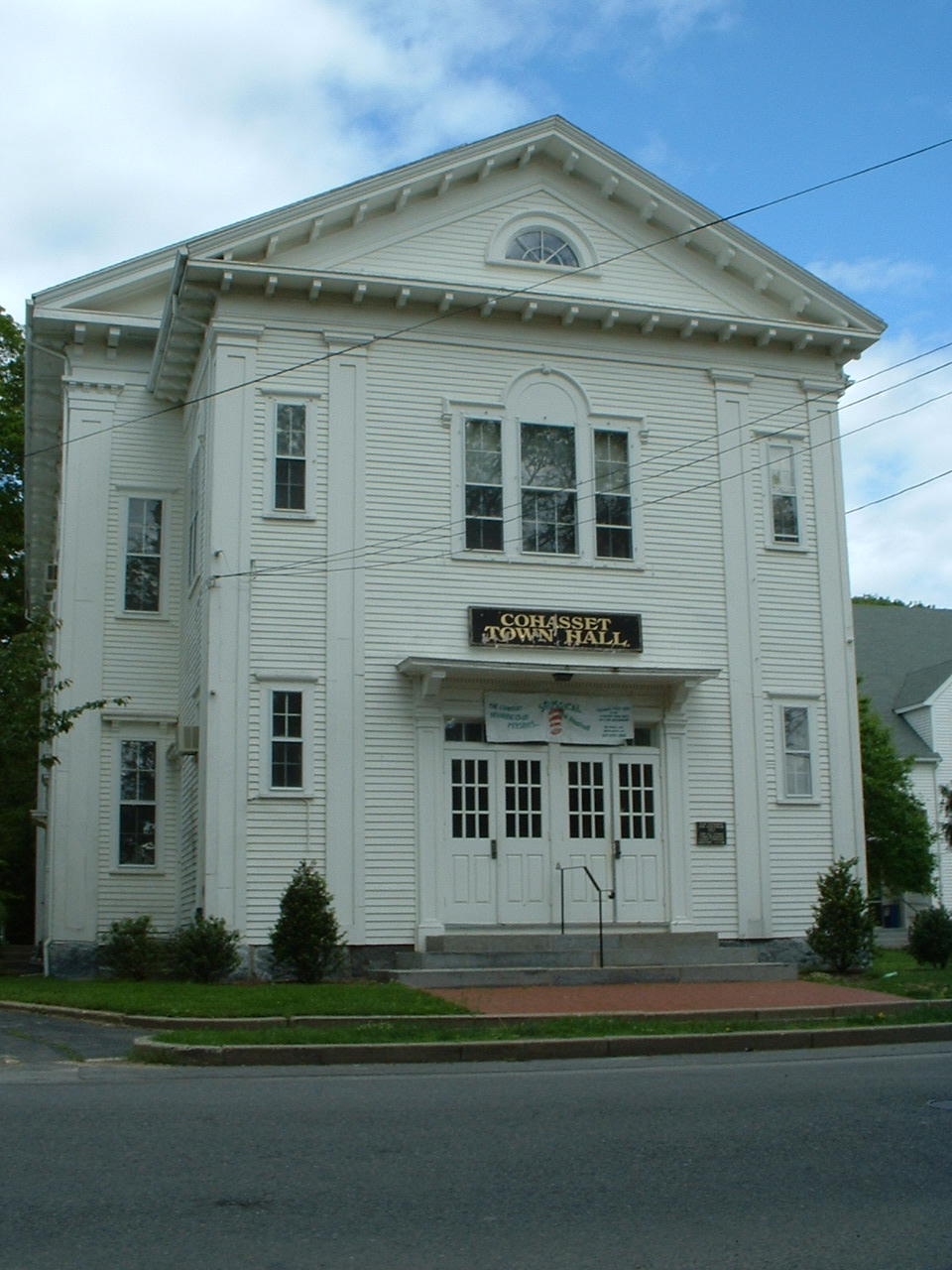
Cohasset Town Hall

On the national level, Cohasset is a part of Massachusetts's 9th congressional district, and is currently represented by Bill Keating. The senior (Class II) Senator, is Elizabeth Warren. The junior (Class I) member of the United States Senate is Edward Markey.

On the state level, Cohasset is represented in the Massachusetts House of Representatives by Joan Meschino as a part of the Third Plymouth district, which includes Hingham, Hull and Scituate. The town is represented in the Massachusetts Senate by Patrick O'Connor as a part of the Plymouth and Norfolk district, which includes the towns of Duxbury, Hingham, Hull, Marshfield, Norwell, Scituate and Weymouth. The town is patrolled on a secondary basis by the First (Norwell) Barracks of Troop D of the Massachusetts State Police.

Cohasset is governed on the local level by the open town meeting form of government, and is led by a town manager and a five-member board of selectmen. The town operates its own police and fire departments, both of which are headquartered near the town center. Emergency services are also provided by the town, with patients taken to the South Shore Hospital in Weymouth. The town's post office is also nearby, just off of the town common. The town's Paul Pratt Memorial Library is located just west of the town center, in what was once a school adjacent to the original library.

Cohasset Schools are represented by and headed by the Cohasset School Committee.

Voter registration and party enrollment as of August 24, 2024
Party	Number of voters	Percentage
Democratic	1,246	19.63%
Republican	878	13.83%
Unaffiliated	4,181	65.89%
Libertarian	16	0.02%
Total	6,345	100%

== Demographics ==
Historical population
Year	Pop.	±%
1790	817	—
1850	1,775	+117.3%
1860	1,953	+10.0%
1870	2,130	+9.1%
1880	2,182	+2.4%
1890	2,448	+12.2%
1900	2,759	+12.7%
1910	2,585	−6.3%
1920	2,639	+2.1%
1930	3,083	+16.8%
1940	3,111	+0.9%
1950	3,731	+19.9%
1960	5,840	+56.5%
1970	6,954	+19.1%
1980	7,174	+3.2%
1990	7,075	−1.4%
2000	7,261	+2.6%
2010	7,542	+3.9%
2020	8,381	+11.1%
2023*	8,392	+0.1%
* = population estimate. Source: United States census records and Population Estimates Program data.

As of the census of 2020, there were 8,373 people, 2,722 households, and 2,024 families residing in the town. The population density was 770.4 inhabitants per square mile (297.5/km^{2}). There were 2,980 housing units, of which 258, or 8.7%, were vacant. The racial makeup of the town was 96% White, 0.5% African American, 0.2% Native American, 0.5% Asian, 0.2% Pacific Islander, 0.2% some other race, and 1.7% from two or more races. Hispanic or Latino of any race were 0.5% of the population.

Of the 2,722 households in the town, 39.9% had children under the age of 18 living with them, 64.0% were headed by married couples living together, 7.8% had a female householder with no husband present, and 25.6% were non-families. Of all households, 22.7% were made up of individuals, and 12.8% were someone living alone who was 65 years of age or older. The average household size was 2.74, and the average family size was 3.27.

29.4% of the town's population were under the age of 18, 4.3% were from 18 to 24, 18.6% were from 25 to 44, 31.6% were from 45 to 64, and 16.0% were 65 years of age or older. The median age was 43.6 years. For every 100 females, there were 96.5 males. For every 100 females age 18 and over, there were 90.9 males.

For the period 2013–2017, the estimated median annual income for a household in the town was $140,000. The median income for a family was $180,345, and the per capita income was $75,885. Male full-time workers earned an estimated $124,420 per year, while females earned $91,103. About 2.5% of families and 3.8% of the population were below the poverty line, including 5.4% of those under age 18 and 1.6% of those age 65 or over.

During the 2013–2017 period, the median home value was $852,300. Of the town residents, 98.3% held at least a high school degree, while 73.3% had a bachelor's degree or higher.

== Education ==
Cohasset operates its own school department for the town's approximately 1,500 students. The Osgood Elementary School serves students from pre-kindergarten through second grade. The Deer Hill Elementary School, located adjacent to the Osgood School, serves students from grades 3–5. The town operates a combined Middle/High School, which is located just over Bear Hill from the other two schools. Cohasset's athletics teams are known as the Skippers, and their colors are navy blue and white. They compete in the South Shore League, and their chief rival is Hull High School.

The athletic programs offered to Cohasset High School students include Baseball, Ice Hockey, Basketball, Cross Country, Tennis, a Competitive Debate Team, Football (which won the 2014 Division VI Super Bowl, and made it to the 2013 Division VI Super Bowl, but lost), Soccer, Competitive Swimming, Track and Field, Sailing, Ski Team, Wrestling and Lacrosse.

High school students may also choose to attend South Shore Technical High School in Hanover free of charge. There are no private schools in Cohasset, and there are several in neighboring Hingham and the towns west of it.

== Transportation ==
No divided highways run through Cohasset. The longest state route through the town is Route 3A, which curves through the town between Scituate and Hingham. Route 228 runs along the border with Hingham, crossing the Weir River into Hull. The nearest airport to Cohasset is Marshfield Municipal Airport. The nearest national and international air service can be reached at Logan International Airport in Boston. T. F. Green Airport, located outside Providence, Rhode Island, is an alternative to this airport, although it is located further away.

The MBTA bus system services the bordering town of Hingham. The MBTA's commuter rail Greenbush Line has a Cohasset station off Route 3A, just east of a cemetery.

== Media ==
Movies filmed in Cohasset:

- The Witches of Eastwick (1987), starring Cher, Susan Sarandon, Michelle Pfeiffer, and Jack Nicholson
- HouseSitter (1992), starring Goldie Hawn and Steve Martin
- The Finest Hours (2016), starring Chris Pine, Casey Affleck and Eric Bana
- Thoroughbreds (2017), starring Anya Taylor-Joy and Anton Yelchin
- Confess, Fletch (2022), starring Jon Hamm and Roy Wood Jr.

== In popular culture ==
Cohasset is the namesake of Cohasset Punch, a brand of rum-based drink historically popular in Chicago. It debuted in the 1890s at the Cohasset residence of actor William H. Crane, and was commissioned by his friend, saloonkeeper Lewis Williams visiting from Chicago. Since 1899, an image of Minot's Ledge Light has featured on the label. Cohasset Punch was discontinued in the late-1980s, but was revived under new ownership in 2024.
