= Scituate High School =

Scituate High School may refer to:

- Scituate High School (Massachusetts)
- Scituate High School (Rhode Island)
