= Greenbush station =

Railway station in Scituate, Massachusetts

Greenbush
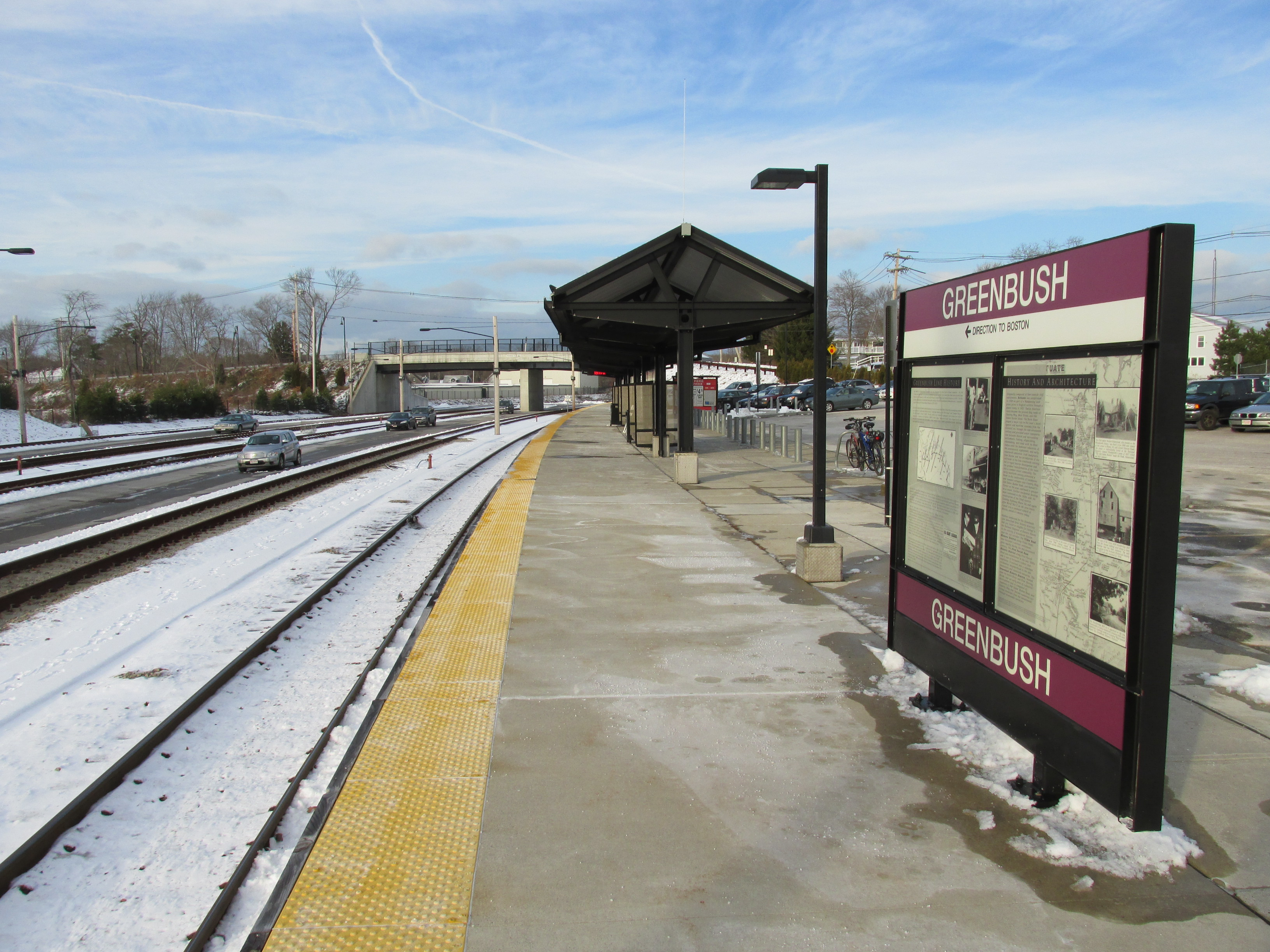
- Platform at Greenbush, looking inbound, in 2012

General information
- Location: 247 Old Driftway; Scituate, Massachusetts
- Coordinates: 42.17882°N 70.74639°W
- Line: Greenbush Branch
- Platforms: 1 side platform
- Tracks: 1 platform track; 4 yard tracks

Construction
- Parking: 1,000 spaces ($4.00 fee)
- Accessible: Yes

Other information
- Fare zone: 6

History
- Opened: October 31, 2007
- Closed: June 30, 1959

Passengers
- 2024: 425 daily boardings

Services
Preceding station	MBTA	Following station
North Scituate toward South Station	Greenbush Line	Terminus
Former services
Preceding station	New York, New Haven and Hartford Railroad	Following station
Scituate toward Boston	South Shore Line	Terminus
Scituate toward Boston	South Shore Line Service until 1938	Marshfield Hills toward Plymouth
Location

Greenbush station is an MBTA Commuter Rail station in Scituate, Massachusetts. Located in the Greenbush section of Scituate, it is the terminus of the Greenbush Line.

== Station layout ==
The station consists of a single side platform serving the easternmost track. Adjacent to the platform, the Greenbush layover consists of four tracks, which are used to store trains overnight. Also adjacent to the platform, a massive parking lot accommodates commuters from nearby towns, such as Norwell and Hanover. The parking lots total 1000 spaces - twice the capacity of the other stations on the line - to accommodate commuters driving in from Hanover, Norwell, Marshfield, and Duxbury.

== History ==
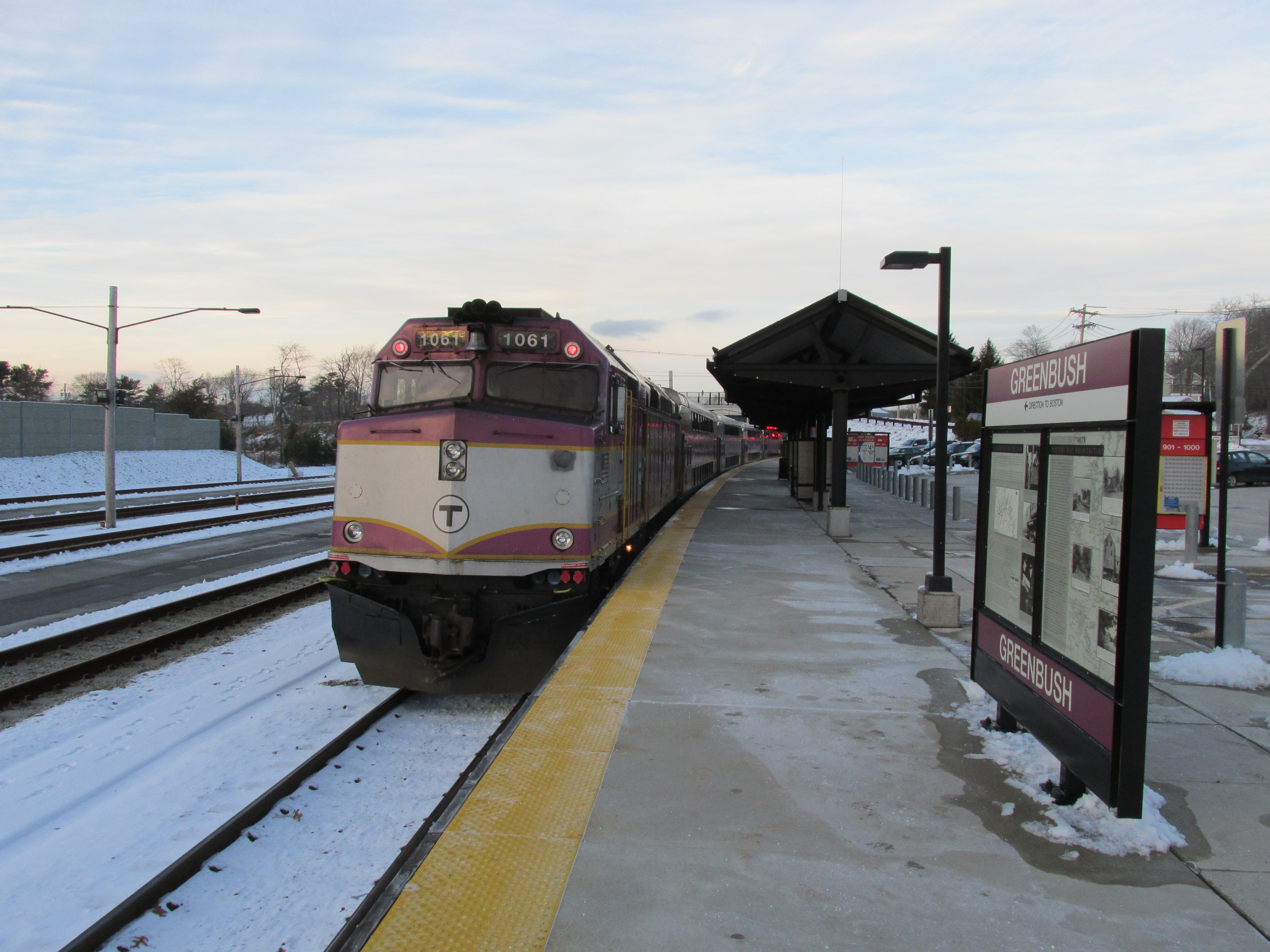
An inbound train leaving Greenbush station in 2012, five years after the restoration of service

The modern Greenbush Line was originally built as the South Shore Railroad, which opened to Cohasset in 1849. The Old Colony-backed Duxbury and Cohasset Railroad, chartered in 1867, which opened from Cohasset to Duxbury in 1871, including a stop at South Scituate. The station was renamed Greenbush on October 1, 1877. After financial troubles in the 1870s, the Duxbury and Cohasset was joined with the South Shore under the fold of the Old Colony Railroad in 1877. The Old Colony was leased to the New York, New Haven, and Hartford Railroad in 1893.

Greenbush became an important short-turn terminal on the South Shore Line, particularly as ridership began to wane. Service south of Greenbush, limited to a single South Duxbury round trip since 1932, was discontinued in 1939 after the 1938 New England hurricane damaged the causeway over the North River to Marshfield. The line enjoyed a brief uptick in traffic in World War II with the construction of the Hingham Naval Ammunition Depot and the Hingham Naval Ammunition Depot Annex. The number of daily trips was increased from 4 to 8 after World War II under Frederick C. Dumaine, Jr., and modern diesel trains including Budd RDCs were introduced in the 1950s. The old station building was replaced with a simple plywood-sheathed station in the early 1950s. However, the New Haven Railroad continued to lose money on the service, and after Dumaine was ousted the railroad announced all trains would cease running in 1958. Only an emergency subsidy by the state kept trains running until June 30, 1959, when the Southeast Expressway opened and all passenger train service ended.

Calls for the former Old Colony lines to be reactivated began in the 1980s; the Plymouth/Kingston Line and Middleborough/Lakeville Line were reopened in 1997. After much controversy surrounding the $534 million project, construction was completed in 2007. The Greenbush line and Greenbush station were opened for full service on October 31, 2007, after a ceremonial train the previous day.

In 2014, the MBTA collected bids to sell the scarcely-used eastern station parking lot for mixed-use development. Most of the lot was owned by the MBTA; in October 2016, Scituate town voters rejected plans to sell a small portion owned by the town. After the original deal for the site fell through, the MBTA board agreed in January 2017 to sell the 4.5-acre (1.8 ha) lot to a different bidder for $2.02 million. The town-owned portion was not sold. The sale to the developer, The Drew Company, was completed around 2019. Construction of the 78-unit complex took place from mid-2021 to late 2023.
