= Cohasset station =

Railway station in Cohasset, Massachusetts

Cohasset
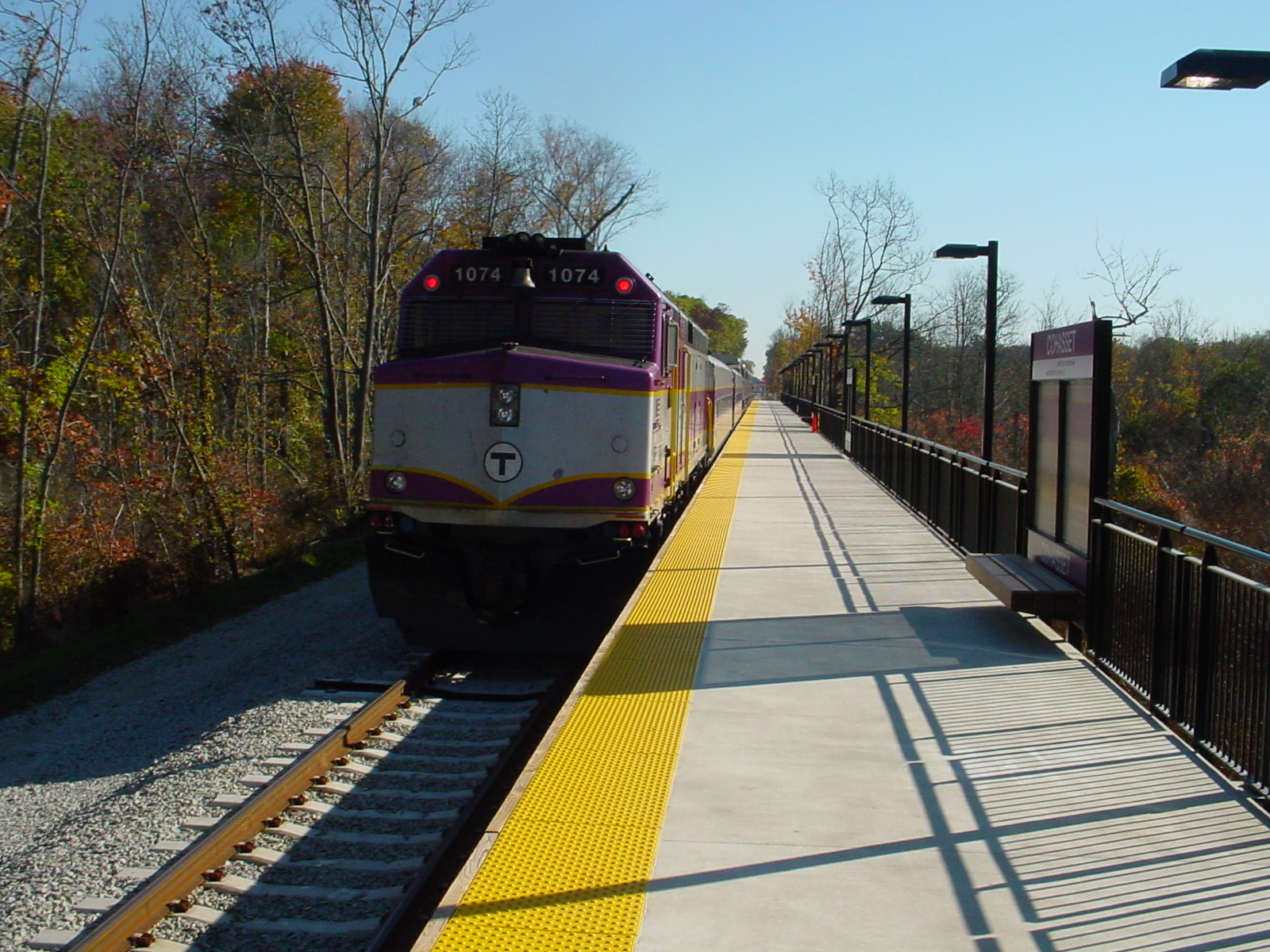
- A train at Cohasset station shortly after opening in 2007

General information
- Location: 115 Chief Justice Cushing Highway; Cohasset, Massachusetts
- Coordinates: 42°14′32.64″N 70°50′13.20″W
- Line: Greenbush Branch
- Platforms: 1 side platform
- Tracks: 1

Construction
- Parking: 410 spaces ($2.00 fee)
- Accessible: Yes

Other information
- Fare zone: 4

History
- Opened: October 31, 2007

Passengers
- 2024: 133 daily boardings

Services
Preceding station	MBTA	Following station
Nantasket Junction toward South Station	Greenbush Line	North Scituate toward Greenbush
Location

Cohasset station is an MBTA Commuter Rail station in Cohasset, Massachusetts. It serves the Greenbush Line. It is located off Chief Justice Cushing Highway (Route 3A) west of downtown Cohasset. The station was opened with the line on October 31, 2007, providing the first rail service to Cohasset since 1959. Cohasset station is fully accessible.

== History ==
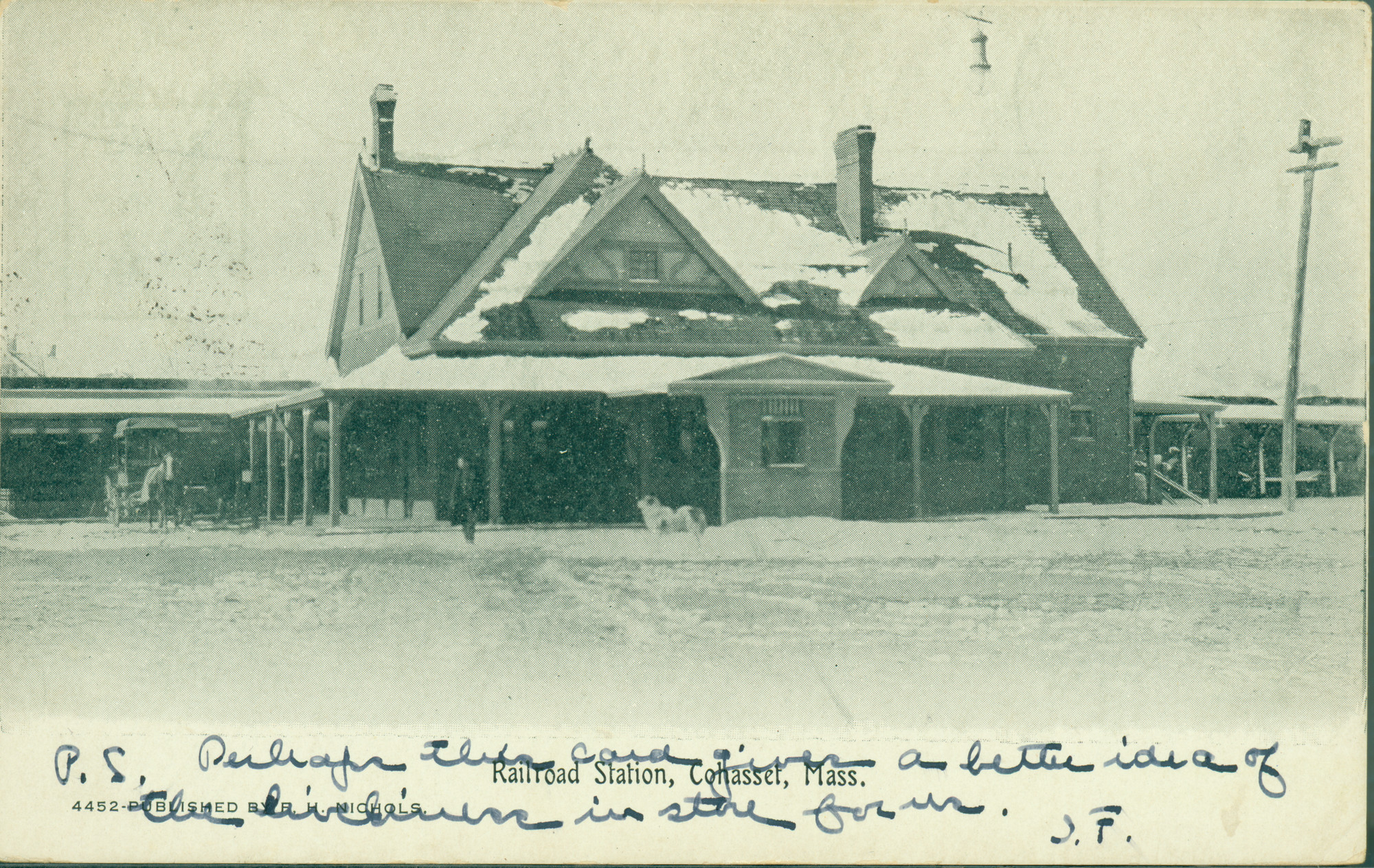
A postcard view of the former station in downtown Cohasset

The South Shore Railroad opened as far to Cohasset on January 1, 1849. By 1878, the Old Colony Railroad controlled the entire line.

The Old Colony and successor New Haven Railroad operated four stations in Cohasset: North Cohasset (Nantasket) at Hull Street, King Street (Black Rock) at King Street, Cohasset at Pleasant Street and Beechwood at Beechwood Street. No station was located at the modern site, which is between populated areas. However, it was the site of the junction with the Whitney Spur, which led to the Hingham Naval Ammunition Depot Annex (open from 1941 to 1962). A new station building at Cohasset was constructed in 1884–85. The New Haven ended passenger services on Old Colony Division on July 30, 1959. The former station was moved about 300 feet (91 m) and converted to a paint store by 1962.

After the closure of the Annex in 1962, it was acquired by the state Department of Conservation and Recreation (DCR) and converted to Wompatuck State Park beginning in 1969. In 2003, the DCR sold the land for the station and parking lot to the MBTA in exchange for the construction of a rail trail on the former rail spur. The station opened with the rest of the Greenbush Line on October 31, 2007. It was intended as a park-and-ride station, with a large parking lot but few pedestrian connections to neighborhoods. The 1.5-mile (2.4 km) Whitney Spur Rail Trail opened from the station to the park around the same time.

However, a gate blocked access from the trail to the northwest section of the park, which still had several dangerous abandoned buildings. After years of requests, demolition of the buildings began in April 2014. The northwest section opened in November 2014 and the gate was removed. With the trail now serving as usable access to the park, 20 spaces in the station lot were dedicated for park users.
