= Frederic C. Dumaine Jr. =

Frederic Christopher "Buck" Dumaine Jr. (September 5, 1903 – March 13, 1997) was an American business executive who served as the president of the New York, New Haven and Hartford Railroad, Avis Rent a Car System, and the Delaware and Hudson Railroad.

== Early life ==
Dumaine was born on September 5, 1903, in Concord, Massachusetts. He graduated from the Pomfret School in 1923. Dumaine was a standout hockey player at Pomfret and also played for the Boston Hockey Club and the Boston Athletic Association.

== Business career ==
Dumaine began working for his father as an errand boy and eventually became the #2 man in his business empire. Following the elder Dumaine's death in 1951, Frederic succeeded his father as president of the New York, New Haven and Hartford Railroad and the Amoskeag Company. In 1954, Patrick B. McGinnis won a proxy fight for control of the New Haven and succeed Dumaine as president.

In 1956, Dumaine was part of a group of Boston businessmen who purchased Avis Rent a Car System. He served as the company's treasurer until 1957, when he was elevated to the role of president. In 1962, Amoskeag sold control of Avis to Lazard Freres and Robert Townsend succeeded Dumaine as the head of the company.

In 1966, Dumaine was elected chairman of the Delaware & Hudson Company; the parent company of the Delaware and Hudson Railroad. Seven months later he was also given the position of president and chief executive officer. He resigned the following year prior to a vote on a merger with the Norfolk and Western Railway, which a majority of the D&H board supported, but Dumaine opposed.

Dumaine also served as an executive with the American Woolen Company, Lehigh Coal and Navigation Company, Waltham Watch Company, Fanny Farmer, Boston Edison Company, Bangor and Aroostook Railroad, Pittsburg and Shawmut Railroad, Boston and Maine Railroad, Boston Garden-Arena Corporation, and Springfield and Eastern Street Railway.

== Politics ==
From 1963 to 1965, Dumaine was the Chairman of the Massachusetts Republican Party. He put together an aggressive grassroots organization that helped the party win the offices of Governor, Lieutenant Governor, and Attorney General in the 1964 Massachusetts elections.

== Personal life ==
Dumaine donated the land for the original Our Lady of Good Voyage Chapel in Boston.

He died on March 13, 1997, in Weston, Massachusetts.

== See also ==
- List of railroad executives

Business positions
Preceded by Frederic C. Dumaine Sr.	President of the New York, New Haven and Hartford Railroad; 1951–1954	Succeeded by Patrick B. McGinnis
Preceded by William M. Tetrick	President of Avis Car Rental; 1957–1962	Succeeded by Robert Townsend
Preceded by John P. Hiltz Jr.	President of the Delaware and Hudson Railway; 1967–1968	Succeeded by Frank W. McCabe
Party political offices
Preceded by Philip K. Allen	Chairman of the Massachusetts Republican Party; 1963–1965	Succeeded by John F. Parker
