= South Shore Railroad =

Map of the South Shore system

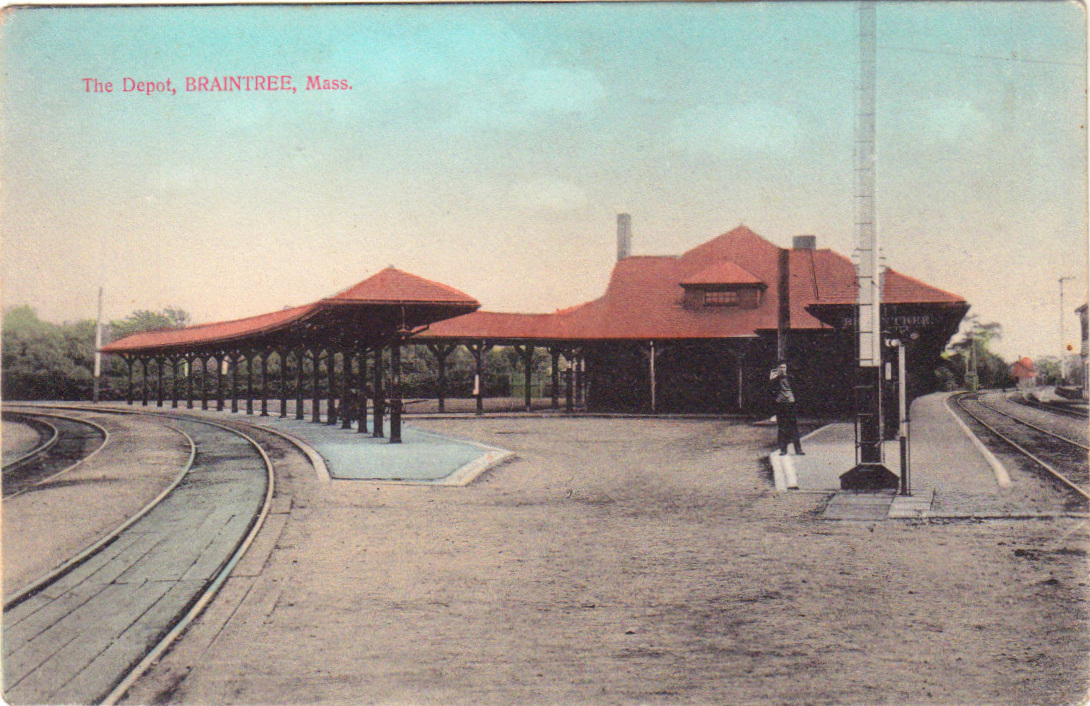
Braintree station on an early postcard. This station, not the same as the modern station, was located where the South Shore Railroad (left) met the Old Colony mainline (right).

The South Shore Railroad was a railroad in Massachusetts. It was incorporated in 1846 to provide rail service between Quincy and Duxbury, Massachusetts through the towns of Hingham, Cohasset, Scituate and Marshfield.

== History ==
The 11.5 mile line opened for service from Braintree to Cohasset, on January 1, 1849. However, the 17.5 mile portion between Cohasset and Duxbury, Massachusetts, was not built until 1871 when a new company, the Duxbury and Cohasset Railroad completed the line to South Duxbury and Kingston where it connected to the old 1844 Old Colony Railroad line to Plymouth. One of the early promoters and presidents of the South Shore Railroad was Caleb Stetson, a successful shoe manufacturer from Braintree.

The contract to use Old Colony equipment expired in 1854, leaving the SSR to run its own trains. The 1849 section of the South Shore Railroad was acquired by the Old Colony Railroad in 1877, while the section between Cohasset and Duxbury became part of the Old Colony network in 1904.

Starting in March 1893, the entire Old Colony Railroad network was operated under lease agreement by the New York, New Haven and Hartford Railroad. The SSR was converted from steam to electric with overhead wires. The increasing usage of the automobile caused the New Haven Railroad to declare bankruptcy in 1937, followed by the Old Colony Railroad, with the New Haven emerging in 1947. The company declared it would end passenger service on the South Shore line in 1958, but the Commonwealth of Massachusetts funded continued operations until June 1959, when the Southeast Expressway opened. The trackage was acquired by Penn Central in 1968, then Conrail in April 1976. The Massachusetts Executive Office of Transportation and Construction purchased the line in 1982, and contracted freight operations to the Bay Colony Railroad. Freight service, which historically had been mostly for national defense customers, continued until the last customer (a General Services Administration depot) switched to trucks in 1983.

On October 31, 2007, commuter rail passenger service on the line was restored from Boston to Greenbush with the opening of the MBTA Greenbush Line.

== Nantasket Beach Railroad ==
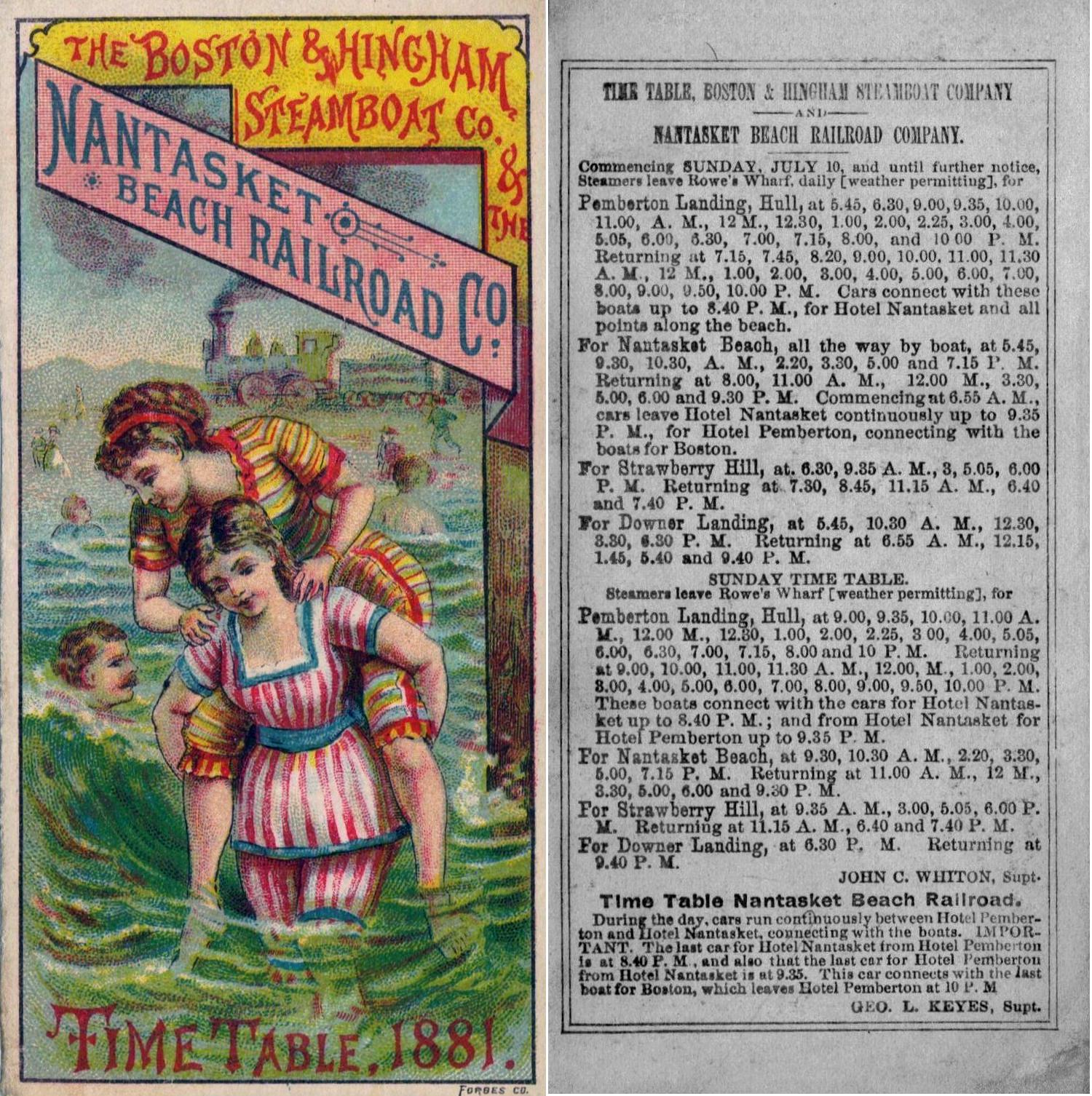
1881 timetable card.

The Nantasket Beach Railroad opened in 1880 as a branch off the South Shore but closed in 1886. It was reopened in 1886 and electrified, running until 1932. Winter service was replaced by buses beginning in 1926. Portions of the former railroad bed were converted to paved roads, including Fitzpatrick Way, in 1937.

== See also ==
- Fore River Railroad
