= Joseph D. Healy =

American explorer (1912–1971)

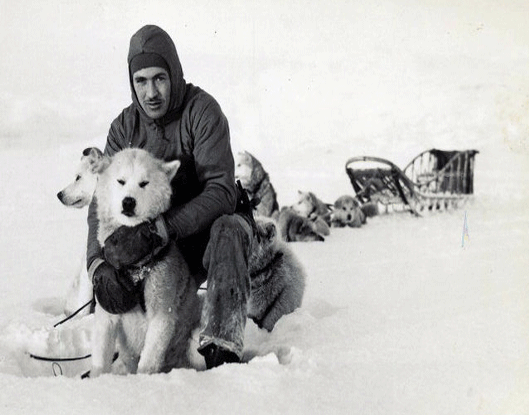
- Greenland c. 1943
- Born: April 29, 1912; Minot, Massachusetts
- Died: July 1, 1971 (aged 59); Pembroke, Massachusetts
- Occupation: Farmer
- Known for: Antarctic exploration, namesake of Cape Healy, My Gal Sal (aircraft) rescue mission

Denis Joseph Healy (April 29, 1912 – July 1, 1971) was an American explorer who was a member of the United States Antarctic Service Expedition.

== Early life and education ==
Healy was the third of ten children of Irish immigrants, Hannah and John Healy. He was born in Scituate, Massachusetts in an area known as the Glades, part of the small seaside community of Minot, Massachusetts, which overlooks Minot's Ledge Light. Educated in local schools, Healy continued his education at the Massachusetts Maritime Academy.

== Career ==
Having served as a dog driver with Richard E. Byrd on the Second Antarctic Expedition, Healy was accepted as a dog driver on the United States Antarctic Service Expedition. Healy and Lytton Musselman were members of the Southeastern-Eternity Range Survey trail party, led by J. Glenn Dyer. The trail party departed East Base with Finn Ronne and Carl R. Eklund on November 6, 1940, separated from Ronne and Eklund on November 21, and proceeded on their expedition until their return to East Base on December 11.

After his return to the U.S. in May 1941, Healy joined the Army Air Corps. He served in Greenland under the command of polar explorer/pilot Bernt Balchen. Healy participated in several search and rescue missions, including the rescue of twenty men from the B-17, My Gal Sal. By the end of the war, Healy had earned the rank of master sergeant.

Upon his separation from the military Healy settled in Pembroke, Massachusetts, and spent the remainder of his life working as a poultry farmer. Healy died suddenly on July 1, 1971, from a heart attack.

Cape Healy at the entrance to Lamplugh Inlet, on the east coast of Palmer Land, Antarctica, is named for him.

== Personal life ==
Healy married Anna C. Finn. They had no children.

== Awards and honors ==

1st Row	Soldier's Medal		
2nd Row	Army Good Conduct Medal	American Defense Service Medal	American Defense Service Medal
3rd Row	Asiatic-Pacific Campaign Medal	World War II Victory Medal	Antarctica Service Medal
