= South Shore (Massachusetts) =

South Shore Irish Riviera
- Region of Massachusetts
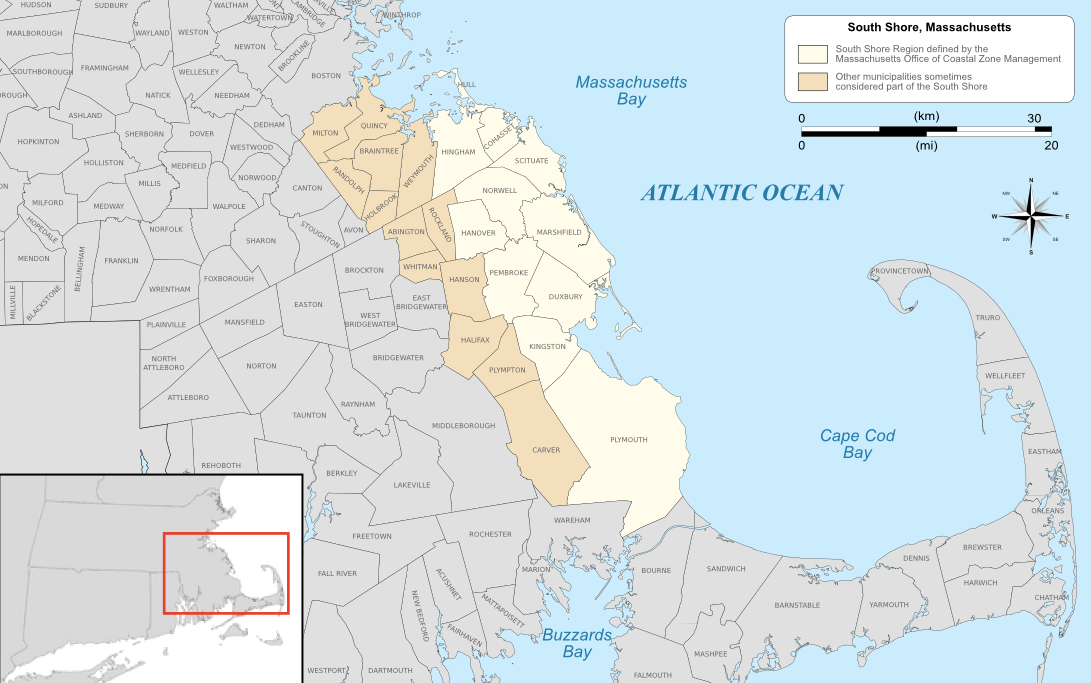
- The South Shore region of Massachusetts
- Coordinates: 42°00′N 70°45′W
- Country: United States
- State: Massachusetts
- Cities and towns: Braintree, Cohasset, Duxbury, Hingham, Hull, Kingston, Marshfield, Plymouth, Quincy, Rockland, Scituate and Weymouth, sometimes adding inland towns

Area
  - Total: 632.9 sq mi (1,639 km^{2})

Population (2010)
  - Total: 541,364
  - Density: 855.4/sq mi (330.3/km^{2})
- Largest city (population): Quincy (101,636)
- Largest city (land): Plymouth (134 square miles)

The South Shore of Massachusetts is a geographic region stretching south and east from Boston toward Cape Cod along the shores of Massachusetts Bay and Cape Cod Bay. It is subject to varying descriptions including municipalities in eastern Norfolk and Plymouth counties. The South Shore is an affluent area. The median income of the region as of 2020 is $104,691. The median home value of the region as of 2020 is $574,831.

Depending on its geographical definition, the South Shore is composed of a mix of suburban towns, mid-sized industrial cities and rural towns. Massachusetts' heaviest concentration of Irish-American residents and descendants from ancestors from Ireland is on the South Shore, and 6 of the United States' 10 most Irish towns are located on the South Shore, which is sometimes referred to locally as the Irish Riviera.

== Geography ==
By its most literal definition, the South Shore includes only cities and towns between Boston and Cape Cod that physically border the Atlantic Ocean, thereby limiting the South Shore to the following:

- Braintree
- Cohasset
- Duxbury
- Hingham
- Hull
- Kingston
- Marshfield
- Plymouth
- Quincy
- Scituate
- Weymouth

The Massachusetts Office of Coastal Zone Management limits its definition of the South Shore to the municipalities between Boston Harbor and Cape Cod, which includes Atlantic coastal and coastal watershed areas "from the three-mile (5 km) limit of the state territorial sea to 100 feet (30 m) beyond the first major land transportation route encountered (a road, highway, rail line, etc.)". This definition eliminates Braintree, Quincy and Weymouth, which border Boston Harbor, but adds the towns of Hanover, Norwell and Pembroke.

- Cohasset
- Duxbury
- Hanover
- Hingham
- Hull
- Kingston
- Marshfield
- Norwell
- Pembroke
- Plymouth
- Scituate

With respect to regional planning and cooperation among municipal governments, some of these coastal communities are either members of the Boston-centered Inner Core Committee of the Metropolitan Area Planning Council (MAPC) or not part of the metropolitan area at all, while the South Shore Coalition of the MAPC comprises representatives from 13 coastal and inland communities and includes the following cities and towns:

- Braintree
- Cohasset
- Duxbury
- Hanover
- Hingham
- Holbrook
- Hull
- Marshfield
- Norwell
- Pembroke
- Rockland
- Scituate
- Weymouth

The South Shore Chamber of Commerce includes all of the above towns, as well as several more farther inland in Norfolk and Plymouth counties, in its definition of the region:

- Abington
- Braintree
- Canton
- Carver
- Cohasset
- Duxbury
- Halifax
- Hanson
- Hanover
- Hingham
- Holbrook
- Hull
- Marshfield
- Milton
- Norwell
- Pembroke
- Plympton
- Quincy
- Randolph
- Rockland
- Scituate
- Weymouth
- Whitman

Informal definitions of South Shore—defined by the service areas of other nonprofits or businesses with "South Shore" in their names, by real estate agents, or by individuals, for example—always include at least some of the shoreline communities but can stretch considerably to the west. Readers of Boston magazine, in 2016, identified "Anything below the city, Cape included" as one potential definition of "South Shore". Suggested western boundaries included the Rhode Island state line, or Massachusetts Route 24. Some individuals placed Foxborough and Stoughton in the region. One definition included all of Cape Cod, as far as Provincetown; others said the South Shore ends at the Sagamore Bridge, which would place part of Bourne in the region.

== Education ==
Institutions of higher learning located in South Shore communities include:

- Curry College, a private four-year liberal arts college with the main campus located in Milton, and a satellite campus located in Plymouth
- Bridgewater State University, a public four-year liberal arts college in Bridgewater, and the largest public university in the Massachusetts State University system outside of the University of Massachusetts system
- Massasoit Community College, a public two-year community college with campuses in Brockton and Canton
- Quincy College, a two-year city-operated community college in Quincy

== Sites of interest ==
- Captain Benjamin James House and Maritime and Irish Mossing Museum, a historic First Period house and museum in Scituate, Massachusetts.
- Daniel Webster Wildlife Sanctuary, a sanctuary owned by the Massachusetts Audubon Society and located in the town of Marshfield, Massachusetts.
- Fort Revere Park, an 8-acre (3.2-hectare) historic site situated on a small peninsula located in Hull, Massachusetts.
- Lawson Tower, a historic tower built in the style of a European castle turret in Scituate Center, Massachusetts.
- North River Wildlife Sanctuary, a wildlife sanctuary owned by the Massachusetts Audubon Society and located in the town of Marshfield, Massachusetts.
- Old Scituate Light, a historic lighthouse located on Cedar Point in Scituate, Massachusetts.
- Worlds End, a park and conservation area in Hingham, Massachusetts.
- Nantasket Beach, a beach in the town of Hull, Massachusetts

== See also ==
- Flim Fest, an annual independent music, film, and arts festival
- North Shore
- South Shore League, a high school athletic conference in Massachusetts
