= Minow =

Minow is a family name.

Notable people with the surname include:

- Martha Minow (born 1954), American legal scholar
- Newton N. Minow (1926–2023), American attorney and chairman of the Federal Communications Commission
- Nell Minow, America film critic

== See also ==
- Minnow, a common name for a number of small fishes
- Minot (disambiguation)
