= Irish Riviera =

United States Irish-American communities

Irish Riviera is a slang expression that can refer to any of several seaside communities in the United States with high population densities of Irish-Americans, including:

- California
  - Sunset District, San Francisco, has a large Irish-born population, in addition to those second-generation and beyond with Irish lineage. There is a United Irish Cultural Center near the San Francisco Zoo, and there is an Irish-American monthly newspaper sold in the Sunset area.
- Rhode Island
  - Newport, Rhode Island
- Indiana
  - Michigan City, a city in northwest Indiana on the shores of Lake Michigan
- Massachusetts
  - The South Shore, a region south of Boston Harbor along the Atlantic coast, which includes Scituate and Marshfield
    - Marshfield, a town south of Boston in Plymouth County on the Atlantic coast
    - Scituate, a town south of Boston in Plymouth County on the Atlantic coast
    - Squantum, a peninsular area of Quincy, directly south of Boston
- Michigan
  - New Buffalo, a city on Lake Michigan's Gold Coast
- New Jersey
  - Avon, a borough in central New Jersey on the Atlantic coast
  - Belmar, a borough in central New Jersey on the Atlantic coast
  - Lake Como, a borough in central New Jersey on the Atlantic coast
  - Spring Lake, a borough in central New Jersey on the Atlantic coast
  - Sea Girt, a borough in central New Jersey on the Atlantic Coast
  - Brigantine,
  - Ocean City,
  - Sea Isle City,
  - Stone Harbor,
  - Avalon,
  - North Wildwood,
  - Wildwood,
  - Cape May,
- New York
  - Breezy Point, Queens, a neighborhood of the New York City borough of Queens
  - Gerritsen Beach, Brooklyn, a neighborhood of the New York City borough of Brooklyn
  - Rockaway Beach, Queens, a neighborhood of the New York City borough of Queens
  - Belle Harbor, Queens a neighborhood of the New York City borough of Queens
