= HMS La Hogue =

1811 Vengeur-class ship of the line

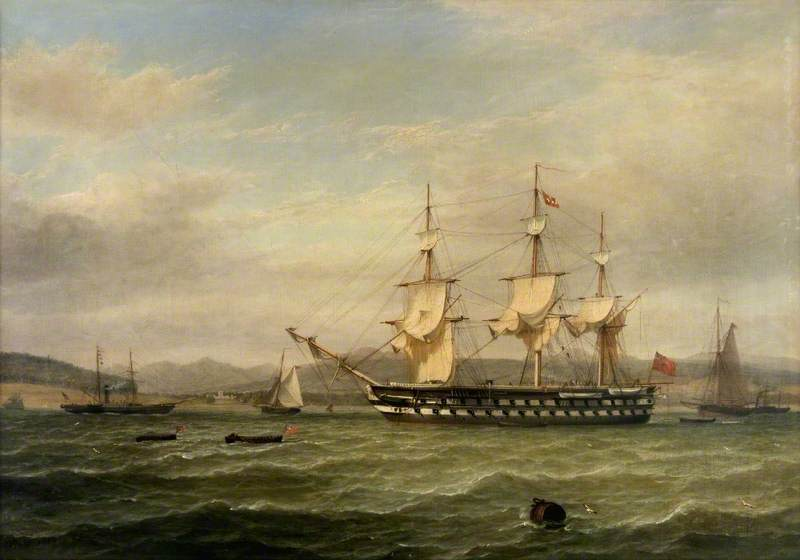
- Hogue

History

United Kingdom
- Name: La Hogue
- Ordered: 1 October 1806
- Builder: Deptford Dockyard
- Laid down: April 1808
- Launched: 3 October 1811
- Commissioned: December 1811
- Fate: Broken up, 1865

General characteristics
- Class & type: Vengeur-class ship of the line
- Tons burthen: 1,749 57/94 (bm)
- Length: 176 ft (53.6 m) (gundeck)
- Beam: 47 ft 7 in (14.5 m)
- Draught: 17 ft 11 in (5.5 m) (light)
- Depth of hold: 21 ft (6.4 m)
- Sail plan: Full-rigged ship
- Complement: 590
- Armament: 74 muzzle-loading, smoothbore; Lower gundeck: 28 × 32 pdr guns; Upper gundeck: 28 × 18 pdr guns; Quarterdeck: 4 × 12 pdr guns, 10 × 32 pdr carronades; Forecastle: 2 × 12 pdrs, 2 × 32 pdr carronades

Plans for the Hogue

HMS La Hogue was a 74-gun third-rate ship of the line of the Royal Navy, launched on 3 October 1811 at Deptford. She was named after the 1692 Battle of La Hogue. "The La Hogue of 1811 [...] sported a green and chocolate lion, its grinning mouth displaying rows of white teeth and a huge red tongue."

== Description ==
La Hogue measured 176 feet (53.6 m) on the gundeck and 145 feet (44.2 m) on the keel. She had a beam of 47 feet 7 inches (14.5 m), a depth of hold of 21 feet (6.4 m) and had a tonnage of 1749 57/94 tons burthen. The ship was armed with 74 muzzle-loading, smoothbore guns that consisted of twenty-eight 32-pounder guns on her lower gundeck and twenty-eight 18-pounder guns on her upper gundeck. In addition, her forecastle mounted a pair of 12-pounder guns and two 32-pounder carronades. On her quarterdeck she carried four 12-pounders and ten 32-pounder carronades.

After the ship was razeed into a 50-gun frigate from November 1824 to March 1826, she was armed with twenty-eight 32-pounder 56 cwt (Note: "Cwt" is the abbreviation for hundredweight, 56 cwt referring to the weight of the gun.) guns on her gundeck, sixteen 32-pounder 48 cwt guns on the quarterdeck and six more on the forecastle.

== History ==
During the War of 1812, while under the command of Thomas Bladen Capel, on 16 May 1813 Hogue recaptured and sent to Halifax, Nova Scotia, the packet Ann. Ann had been on her way from Jamaica to Halifax when the American privateer Yorktown had captured her. However, the American privateer Young Teazer again captured Ann and sent her into Portland, Maine.

Later, La Hogue successfully trapped Young Teazer off the coast of Nova Scotia, British North America.

On 16 August 1813 La Hogue captured the Portuguese ship Flor de Mar. At the time HMS Tenedos was in sight. (Note: A first-class share of the prize money was worth £252 0s 9½d; a sixth-class share, that of an ordinary seaman, was worth £1 11s 11¾d.)

La Hogue was driven ashore at Halifax, Nova Scotia, on 12 November 1813 during a storm. She was refloated, repaired, and returned to service.

From 7–8 April 1814, ships' boats of the La Hogue, Endymion, Maidstone and Borer attacked Pettipague point. In 1847 the Admiralty awarded the Naval General Service Medal with clasp "8 Apr Boat Service 1814" to all surviving claimants from the action. The raid was commanded by Coote, who was promoted as a result of the successful outcome, as was Lieutenant Pyne of the La Hogue who assisted him.

In September 1814, La Hogue anchored near the Scituate Light station on the coast of Massachusetts with the intent of sending a raiding party into the town. Rebecca and Abigail Bates, the lighthouse keeper's daughters, repulsed the attack by playing a drum and a fife that had been left at the station, simulating the approach of the town militia.

La Hogue was converted into a screw-propelled steamship frigate in 1850. From 1852, she acted as a guard-ship at Devonport under the command of Captain William Ramsay and saw her final service, still under Ramsay, on duties in the Baltic Sea during the Crimean War. On 18 September 1855, she ran aground off Renskär, Sweden and was severely damaged. She was refloated with the assistance of three gunboats after her lower deck guns were taken out.

She was eventually broken up in 1865.
