= Lawson Tower =

- U.S. National Register of Historic Places
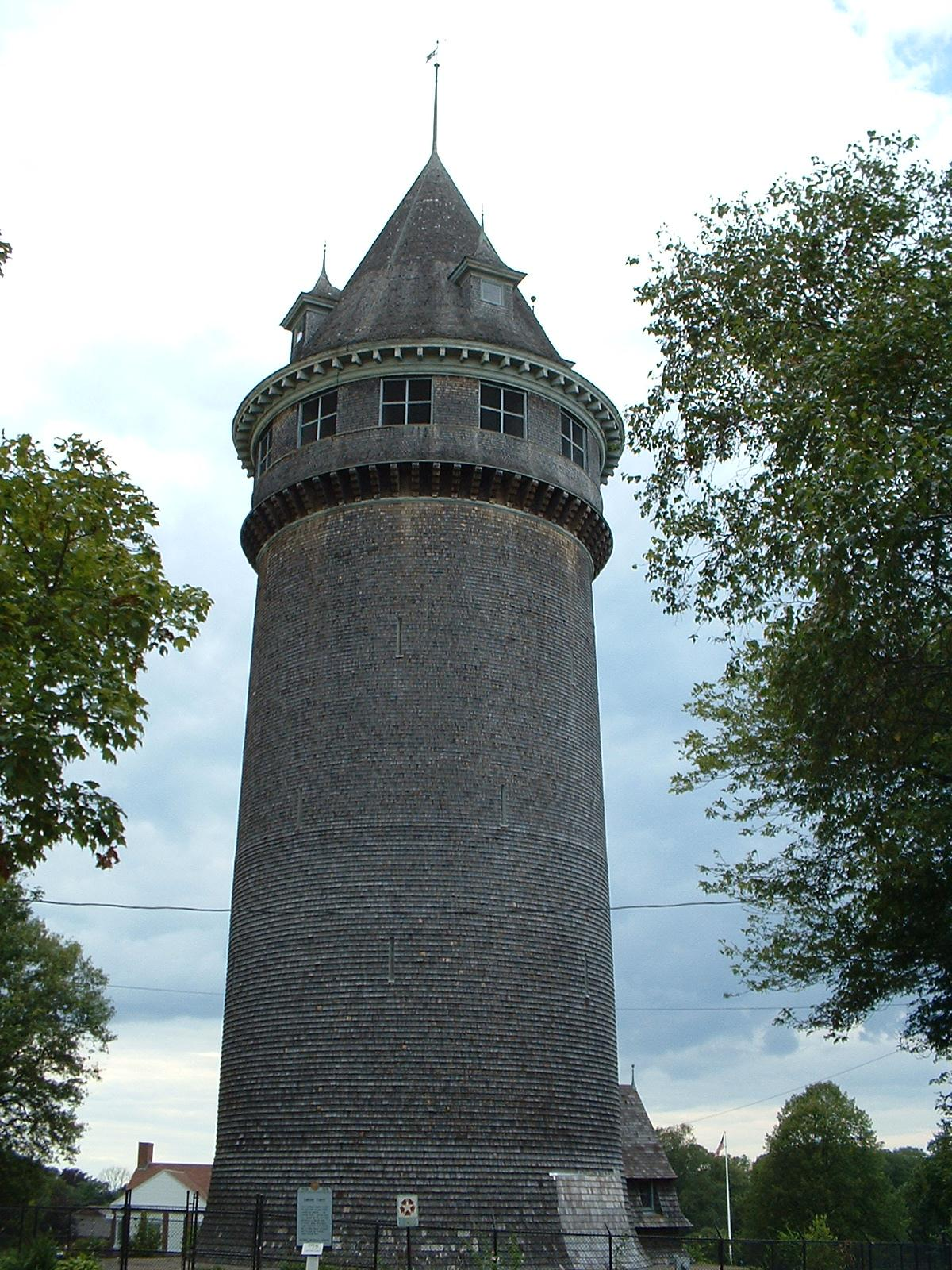
- Lawson Tower, Scituate, Massachusetts. The tower was part of Lawson's Dreamwold estate.

- Location within Massachusetts Location within the United States
- Location: Scituate Center, Massachusetts
- Coordinates: 42°12′1″N 70°45′21″W
- Area: less than one acre
- Built: 1902
- Architect: Coolidge & Carlson
- NRHP reference No.: 76001963
- Added to NRHP: September 28, 1976

Lawson Tower is a historic tower built in the style of a European castle turret. It is located off First Parish Road in Scituate Center, Massachusetts, United States. Built in 1902 to enclose a steel water tank, it is a major local landmark. The Scituate Water Company stopped using the tank in 1988. The tower is listed as both an American Water Landmark and in the National Register of Historic Places. It has become a popular tourist destination, featuring sweeping views of the South Shore, Old Scituate Light, Minot's Ledge Light and the nearby First Trinitarian Congregational Church.

== Description and history ==
The tower is a steel frame structure standing 153 feet (47 m) in height, its tank and steel superstructure enclosed in a stylistically eclectic wooden shell. It is shingled to the top of the enclosed tank, where there is a band of bracketing. Above this are two circular chambers, one to house bells and the other a clock. The tower is covered by a conical roof.

The steel water tank was built in 1900 by the Scituate Water Company, the local municipal water supplier. At the same time, Thomas W. Lawson, a wealthy Boston businessman, was building his "Dreamwold" estate next door. Upset by the view of the utilitarian tank, Lawson negotiated with the company to enclose it. Lawson commissioned the Meneely Bell Foundry of West Troy, New York, to install ten bells at the top of the tower. These bells range in size from three hundred to three thousand pounds. This chime system was originally designed to be played either from the bell room eighty feet above the ground or on the console of the clavier room.

The tower is equipped with an internal sprinkler system, after a similar wooden water tower in East Boston was destroyed by fire in the early 1900s.

== See also ==
- Forbes Hill Standpipe
- National Register of Historic Places listings in Plymouth County, Massachusetts
- Telegraph Hill (Hull, Massachusetts)
