= List of shipwrecks in January 1824 =

The list of shipwrecks in January 1824 includes some ships sunk, foundered, grounded, or otherwise lost during January 1824.

== 1 January ==
List of shipwrecks: 1 January 1824
Ship	State	Description
Betsey	United Kingdom	The ship was in collision with John Albert (United Kingdom) in The Downs and foundered. Her crew were rescued by John Albert. Betsey was on a voyage from London to Bridport, Dorset.
Deux Frères	France	The ship was wrecked at Gatteville-le-Phare, Manche. Her crew were rescued. She was on a voyage from Cette, Hérault to Rouen, Seine-Inférieure.
Hornby	United Kingdom	The ship was wrecked at Great Orme Head, Caernarfonshire with the loss of sixteen of the seventeen people on board. She was on a voyage from Liverpool, Lancashire to Rio de Janeiro, Brazil.
Liberty	United Kingdom	The ship was wrecked on Scroby Sands, Norfolk. She was on a voyage from Christiana [sic], Norway to Poole, Dorset.
Nancy	United Kingdom	The ship was wrecked 5 nautical miles (9.3 km) west of Dunbar, Lothian. Her crew were rescued. She was on a voyage from the Firth of Forth to Dunbar.

== 2 January ==
List of shipwrecks: 2 January 1824
Ship	State	Description
Alliance	United Kingdom	The ship was driven ashore at Great Yarmouth, Norfolk.
Cumberland	United Kingdom	The ship struck an anchor and sank at Milford Haven, Pembrokeshire. She was on a voyage from Seville, Spain to London.
Deux Daniel	France	The ship was wrecked near Cayeux-sur-Mer, Somme. Her crew were rescued. She was on a voyage from Martinique to Havre de Grâce, Seine-Inférieure.
Hornby	United Kingdom	The ship was wrecked at Great Orme Head, Caernarfonshire with the loss of all but one of her crew. She was on a voyage from Liverpool, Lancashire to Rio de Janeiro, Brazil.
Liberty	United Kingdom	The ship was wrecked on Scroby Sands, Norfolk. She was on a voyage from Christiana [sic], Norway to Poole, Dorset.
Little Sam	United Kingdom	The ship was driven ashore and wrecked at Wells-next-the-Sea, Norfolk.
Niger	United Kingdom	The ship was wrecked on the Haisborough Sands, in the North Sea off the coast of Norfolk with the loss of all but four of her crew. She was on a voyage from Newcastle upon Tyne, Northumberland to Grenada.

== 3 January ==
List of shipwrecks: 3 January 1824
Ship	State	Description
Abeona	France	The ship departed from Havre de Grâce, Seine-Inférieure for Bordeaux, Gironde and had not arrived by 27 January.
Aurora	Prussia	The ship was wrecked on Ameland, Friesland, Netherlands. Her crew were rescued. She was on a voyage from Memel to London, United Kingdom.
Cygnet	United States	The ship was driven ashore on the Île à Vache, Haiti. She was on a voyage from Maracaibo, Gran Colombia to New York.
Margaret	United Kingdom	The ship was wrecked on The Skerries, in the Irish Sea off the coast of County Antrim. She was on a voyage from Pulteneytown, Caithness to Newry, County Antrim.
Victoire	France	The ship was wrecked in the Glenan Islands, Finistère. Her crew were rescued.

== 4 January ==
List of shipwrecks: 4 January 1824
Ship	State	Description
Love	United Kingdom	The ship was driven ashore at Bilbao, Spain. She was on a voyage from Newfoundland, British North America to Bilbao. Love was refloated on 6 January.

== 5 January ==
List of shipwrecks: 5 January 1824
Ship	State	Description
Sampson	United Kingdom	The ship was off the Grand Banks of Newfoundland on this date whilst bound from Prince Edward Island, British North America to Bristol, Gloucestershire. No further trace, presumed foundered in the Atlantic Ocean with the loss of all hands.
Success	United Kingdom	The ship was driven ashore and wrecked on Cabadella Point, Portugal. Her crew were rescued. She was on a voyage from Figueira da Foz, Portugal to Dartmouth, Devon.
Vrow Gesina	Netherlands	The ship was driven ashore on the north east point of Terschelling, Friesland. She was on a voyage from Kristiansand, Norway to Brussels, South Brabant.

== 6 January ==
List of shipwrecks: 6 January 1824
Ship	State	Description
Juno	United Kingdom	The ship was holed by an anchor and sank at North Shields, County Durham. She was later refloated and beached.

== 7 January ==
List of shipwrecks: 7 January 1824
Ship	State	Description
James Barron	United States	The ship was wrecked off Anegada, Virgin Islands. She was on a voyage from Charleston, South Carolina to Barbados.
Oscar	United States	The ship was driven ashore near Bremen.

== 8 January ==
List of shipwrecks: 8 January 1824
Ship	State	Description
Hero	United States	The ship was wrecked on a reef off the southwest coast of Cuba. Her crew were rescued. She was on a voyage from Marseille, Bouches-du-Rhône, France to Havana, Cuba.

== 9 January ==
List of shipwrecks: 9 January 1824
Ship	State	Description
Banon	United Kingdom	The ship was driven ashore and sand at Priestholm, Anglesey. Her crew were rescued. She was on a voyage from Liverpool, Lancashire to Dublin. Banon was refloated on 18 January and taken in to Beaumaris, Anglesey.

== 11 January ==
List of shipwrecks: 11 January 1824
Ship	State	Description
Good Intent	United Kingdom	The ship was wrecked on the Foreness Rock, Margate, Kent. She was on a voyage from Newport, Monmouthshire to London. Good Intent was refloated on 14 January and taken in to Margate.
Levant Star	United Kingdom	The ship was driven ashore in Margate Bay. She was on a voyage from London to Liverpool, Lancashire. Levant Star was refloated on 14 January and taken in to Margate.
Vriede	Netherlands	The ship was driven ashore at Ostend, West Flanders. She was on a voyage from London to Antwerp. Vriede was declared a total loss.
West India Packet	United Kingdom	The ship was driven ashore in Margate Bay. She was on a voyage from London to Jamaica. West India Packet was refloated on 12 January and put into Ramsgate, Kent.

== 12 January ==
List of shipwrecks: 12 January 1824
Ship	State	Description
Louisa	Sweden	The ship was driven ashore at Dungeness, Kent, United Kingdom. She was on a voyage from Stockholm to London, United Kingdom and Alexandria, Egypt. Louisa was refloated on 14 January and resumed her voyage.

== 13 January ==
List of shipwrecks: 13 January 1824
Ship	State	Description
Aurora	United Kingdom	The ship was driven ashore in Holm Sound, Orkney Islands. She was on a voyage from St. Andrews, New Brunswick, British North America to Hull, Yorkshire.
Vreede	Netherlands	The ship was driven ashore west of Ostend, West Flanders. She was on a voyage from London, United Kingdom to Antwerp.

== 14 January ==
List of shipwrecks: 14 January 1824
Ship	State	Description
Cornelius	United Kingdom	The ship ran aground on the Goodwin Sands, Kent and sank. Her crew were rescued. She was on a voyage from Sunderland, County Durham to Plymouth, Devon.
Waterloo	United Kingdom	The ship was lost off "Cayte", She was on a voyage from Liverpool, Lancashire to Pará, Brazil.

== 17 January ==
List of shipwrecks: 17 January 1824
Ship	State	Description
James	United Kingdom	The ship was in collision with another vessel in the Firth of Forth off Bo'ness, Lothian and foundered. Her crew survived. She was on a voyage from Alloa, Clackmannanshire to Perth.
Zodiac	United Kingdom	The ship was abandoned in the Atlantic Ocean with the loss of one of her eighteen crew. Survivors were rescued by Eliza (United Kingdom). Zodiac was on a voyage from St. Andrew, New Brunswick, British North America to Bristol, Gloucestershire.

== 18 January ==
List of shipwrecks: 18 January 1824
Ship	State	Description
Buster	United Kingdom	The ship was driven ashore near Peniche, Portugal. She was on a voyage from Plymouth, Devon to Lisbon, Portugal.
Reaper	United Kingdom	The ship was driven ashore at Alicante, Spain. She had been refloated by 31 January.

== 20 January ==
List of shipwrecks: 20 January 1824
Ship	State	Description
Federal George	United States	The ship was wrecked near the Scituate Lighthouse, Massachusetts. Her crew were rescued. She was on a voyage from Philadelphia, Pennsylvania to Boston, Massachusetts.
Flying Fish	United Kingdom	The ship departed from Smyrna, Ottoman Empire for Liverpool, Lancashire. No further trace, presumed foundered with the loss of all hands.

== 22 January ==
List of shipwrecks: 22 January 1824
Ship	State	Description
Harmony	United Kingdom	The ship foundered in the Atlantic Ocean 40 nautical miles (74 km) north by west of Padstow, Cornwall. Her crew survived. She was on a voyage from Hayle, Cornwall to Swansea, Glamorgan.
Hope	United Kingdom	The ship foundered on the Gore Sand, in Bridgwater Bay. Her crew were rescued. She was on a voyage from Newport, Monmouthshire to Bridgwater, Somerset.
Irlam	United Kingdom	The ship was wrecked on the Blackwater Bank, in the Irish Sea off the coast of County Wexford. Her crew were rescued. She was on a voyage from Liverpool, Lancashire to Barbados.
Spanish Patriot	United Kingdom	The ship was wrecked near Boscastle, Cornwall. Her crew were rescued. She was on a voyage from Porto, Portugal to Bristol, Gloucestershire.

== 23 January ==
List of shipwrecks: 23 January 1824
Ship	State	Description
Eleanor	United Kingdom	The ship sprang a leak in the Bay of Biscay 35 nautical miles (65 km) off the Cordouan Lighthouse, Gironde, France and was abandoned by her crew. They were rescued by Harmonie (Norway). Eleanor was on a voyage from Newcastle upon Tyne, Northumberland to Bordeaux, Gironde.
Roberts	United Kingdom	The ship was wrecked on the Cordouan Rocks, in the Gironde Estuary with the loss of all hands. She was on a voyage from Sunderland, County Durham to Bordeaux.

== 24 January ==
List of shipwrecks: 24 January 1824
Ship	State	Description
Bull Dog	United Kingdom	The ship foundered 100 nautical miles (190 km) east of "Cape St. Rocque". Her crew were rescued. She was on a voyage from Pernambuco, Brazil to Liverpool, Lancashire.
Nancy	United States	The ship was driven ashore north of the Cape May Lighthouse, New Jersey. Her crew were rescued. She was on a voyage from Plymouth, Massachusetts to Martinique.
Nelson	United Kingdom	The ship was driven ashore and severely damaged at Maryport, Cumberland. She was on a voyage from Liverpool, Lancashire to Maryport.

== 25 January ==
List of shipwrecks: 25 January 1824
Ship	State	Description
HMS Columbine	Royal Navy	The Cruizer-class brig-sloop was wrecked on Sapientza, United States of the Ionian Islands, off Methini, Greece. Her crew survived.
Dorothea	United Kingdom	The ship was driven ashore and wrecked between Annestown and Bunmahon, County Waterford. Her crew were rescued. She was on a voyage from Savannah, Georgia, United States to Liverpool, Lancashire.
Mayflower	United Kingdom	The sloop was driven ashore at Dublin. She was on a voyage from the Shetland Islands to Dublin.
Nancy	United Kingdom	The ship was driven ashore on the coast of Ayrshire. Her crew were rescued. She was on a voyage from Ayr to Rothesay, Bute.
New Packet	United States	The ship was driven ashore in Loch Maddy. She was on a voyage from Saint Petersburg, Russian Empire to Portsmouth, New Hampshire. New Packet was later refloated.
Rebecca	United Kingdom	The ship was driven ashore on the coast of Ayrshire. Her crew were rescued. She was on a voyage from Ayr to Rothesay.
Recovery	United Kingdom	The ship was in collision with Henrietta (United Kingdom) in the North Sea off Flamborough Head, Yorkshire. She was consequently beached north of Bridlington, Yorkshire. Recovery was refloated on 1 February and taken in to Bridlington.

== 26 January ==
List of shipwrecks: 26 January 1824
Ship	State	Description
Alert	United States	The ship was driven ashore near the Scituate Lighthouse, Massachusetts. She was on a voyage from La Rochelle, Charente-Maritime, France to Boston, Massachusetts.

== 28 January ==
List of shipwrecks: 28 January 1824
Ship	State	Description
Marianne Henriette	Sweden	The ship was wrecked on the Goodwin Sands, Kent, United Kingdom. Her crew were rescued. She was on a voyage from St. Ubes, Portugal to Stockholm.
Vrow Gesina	Netherlands	The ship was driven ashore and wrecked at Boscastle, Cornwall, United Kingdom. She was on a voyage from Lisbon, Portugal to London, United Kingdom.

== 29 January ==
List of shipwrecks: 29 January 1824
Ship	State	Description
Eleanor	United Kingdom	The ship ran aground on the Newarp Sand, in the North Sea off the cost of Norfolk and sank. Her crew were rescued. She was on a voyage from Newcastle upon Tyne, Northumberland to Poole, Dorset.

== 30 January ==
List of shipwrecks: 30 January 1824
Ship	State	Description
Armenius	United States	The ship was wrecked in the River Plate.

== Unknown date ==
List of shipwrecks: Unknown date in January 1824
Ship	State	Description
Albuquerque	Portugal	The ship was wrecked near Les Sables d'Olonne, Vendée, France.
American	Denmark	The ship was beached at Østerisør. She was on a voyage from Copenhagen to Lisbon, Portugal.
Boulton	United Kingdom	The ship was driven ashore and wrecked in Sheephaven Bay before 6 January. She was on a voyage from Barbados to Cork.
Christiana Elizabeth	Denmark	The ship was wrecked on Læsø. She was on a voyage from Lisbon, Portugal to Copenhagen.
Eleonore Charlotte	France	The ship was lost in the Baltic Sea. She was on a voyage from Bordeaux, Gironde to Saint Petersburg, Russia.
Fabius	Bremen	The ship was abandoned in the Atlantic Ocean. Her crew were rescued by Hippomeme (France). Fabius was on a voyage from Bremen to St. Ubes, Portugal.
Frances	United Kingdom	The ship was driven ashore on Lindisfarne, Northumberland in early January. She was on a voyage from Great Yarmouth, Norfolk to Alloa, Clackmannanshire.
Jupiter	(United Kingdom of Great Britain and Ireland) New South Wales	The brig was wrecked on Ateu Island, 400 nautical miles (740 km) east of Tahiti.
Marie Perrine	France	The ship was lost near L'Orient, Morbihan. Her crew were rescued. She was on a voyage from Bordeaux, Gironde to Rouen, Seine-Inférieure.
Sophie	Grand Duchy of Oldenburg	The ship was wrecked on the Île d'Yeu, Vendée, France. She was on a voyage from Oldenburg to Bordeaux.
Thalia	France	The ship was driven ashore in the Dardanelles. She was on a voyage from Constantinople to Marseille, Bouches-du-Rhône.
Union	United States	The ship foundered in the Atlantic Ocean. Her crew were rescued by Cazique Roy (France). Union was on a voyage from Providence, Rhode Island to Havana, Cuba.
Whim	United Kingdom	The ship was driven ashore at Riga, Russia. She had been refloated by 26 January.
