= Minot (disambiguation) =

Minot is a city located in north central North Dakota in the United States.

Minot may also refer to:

== Places ==
United States

- Minot, Maine, a town in Androscoggin County
- Minot, Massachusetts, a locality in Plymouth County
- Minot, Mississippi, a locality in Sunflower County
- Minot's Ledge, a reef off the harbor of Cohasset, Massachusetts

France

- Minot, Côte-d'Or, a commune in the region of Bourgogne in eastern France

== People ==
- Ann Stone Minot (1894–1980), American biochemist and physiologist.
- George Minot (1885–1950), winner of the 1934 Nobel Prize in Physiology or Medicine
- Charles Sedgwick Minot (1852–1914), American anatomist
- Fanny E. Minot (1847-1919), American public worker
- Henry Minot (1859–1890), American ornithologist and railroad investor
- Laurence Minot (aviator) (1896–1917), British World War I flying ace
- Laurence Minot (poet), 14th-century English poet
- Maxime Minot (born 1987), French politician
- Raoul Minot (1893–1945), French photographer
- Susan Minot (born 1956), American novelist and short story writer
- Stephen Minot (1927-2010), American novelist and short story writer
- Minot Judson Savage (1841–1918), American clergyman

== Other uses ==
- Minot (unit), a unit of dry volume used in France prior to metrication
