= Government Island =

Government Island may refer to several places:

- Government Island, the former name of Coast Guard Island
- Government Island (Oregon), a 1,760-acre (7 km^{2}) island in the Columbia River north of Portland
- Government Island Historic District, a historic district on Border Street in Cohasset, Massachusetts
- Government Island (Virginia), site of a sandstone quarry; source of stone for early District of Columbia buildings and monuments
