= American Army of Two =

Massachusetts lighthouse attendants in 1814

The American Army of Two, sometimes called American Lighthouse Army of Two, is the name commonly given to Rebecca and Abigail Bates of Scituate, Massachusetts. They were lighthouse keeper Simeon Bates' daughters.

== History ==
In September, 1814, Bates was away from the Old Scituate Light station with most of his family when the British landed a warship, the La Hogue, near the harbor with the intent of sending a raiding party into the town. Soon the ship launched two long boats filled with soldiers. Rebecca and Abigail, then aged 21 and 17, left alone with their mother at the station, realized that there was no time to warn citizens of the impending attack. Seizing a fife and drum that had been left behind at the station, they began to play. The soldiers, assuming that the sound signaled the approach of the town militia, retreated hastily.

== Personal lives ==
The sisters lived to be quite old, and Rebecca took to selling affidavits for ten cents apiece in later years, always swearing the story to be true.
