= Flim Fest =

- Company type: Film, Music and Arts Festival
- Founded: 2004
- Founder: Kevin James & Joe Botsch
- Headquarters: Kingston, Massachusetts
- Area served: New England
- Website: Flim Fest.com

Flim Fest is an independent music, film, and arts festival held annually on the South Shore of Massachusetts founded in 2004. The event, hosted by Kevin James and Joe Botsch, begins each year with live performances from various New England area bands and is followed by a movie screening that includes animations, short films, and feature-length projects.

Since 2004 the festival's attendance and public recognition has grown each year as new film makers and artists have attended. In 2009 three hundred people were estimated to be in attendance. Flim Fest has a free submission policy where all materials submitted to the festival require no fees to be considered for the screening. The festival's title has often been the butt of many jokes questioning the grammatic skills of the festival's organizers.
