= Peggotty Beach =

Beach in Massachusetts

Coordinates: 42.1878°N 70.7199°W

Peggotty Beach is located in Scituate, Massachusetts. Peggotty is one of the five public beaches in Scituate and is half a mile long. Peggotty Beach is accessible through Peggotty Beach Road.

In 2016, a large storm flooded the beach. After this storm, the sand accumulated on the opposite side of the beach about 15 feet.

In 2019, Scituate received a grant to help protect Peggotty Beach shores.
