= Minots Ledge =

Coordinates: 42°16′24″N 70°45′38″W

Minots Ledge, sometimes appearing as Minot's Ledge and also known as the Cohasset Rocks, is a reef off the harbor of Cohasset, Massachusetts, 15 miles (24 km) southeast of Boston, Massachusetts.

The reef the site of the Minot's Ledge Light, completed in 1860 and considered one of the most significant American engineering achievements of the 19th century. It was constructed by installing pins through tons of granite blocks into the rocks beneath to form the 40-foot (12 m) base of the tower. The lighthouse is still operating. It is located within the Town of Scituate, in Plymouth County.

== Sources ==
- Merriam-Webster's Geographical Dictionary (Third ed.). Springfield, Massachusetts: Merriam-Webster, Incorporated. 1997. ISBN 0-87779-546-0.
