= Government Island Historic District =

Historic district in Massachusetts, United States

- U.S. National Register of Historic Places
- U.S. Historic district
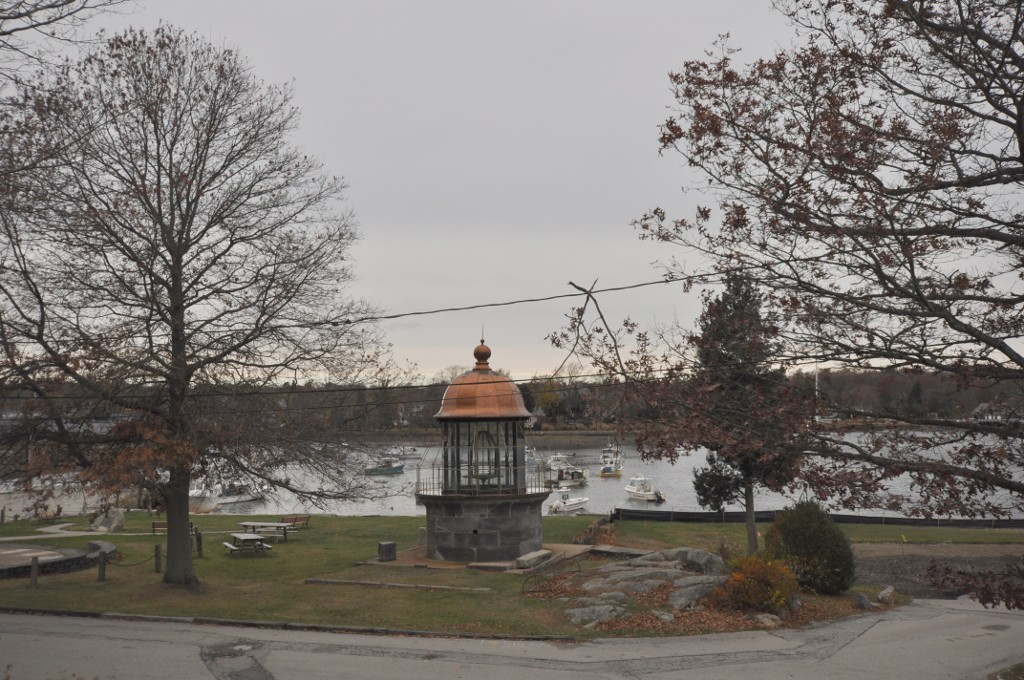

- Location within Massachusetts Location within the United States
- Location: Cohasset, Massachusetts
- Coordinates: 42°14′17″N 70°47′21″W
- Built: 1855
- Architect: Totten, Joseph G.; Alexander, Barton S.
- NRHP reference No.: 94000424
- Added to NRHP: May 12, 1994

The Government Island Historic District is a historic district on Border Street in Cohasset, Massachusetts. It was for many years the land station associated with the Minot's Ledge Light. Due to the difficulties associated with the construction of the light, its tower was actually assembled first on this site; the foundation area used for this purpose is marked in the small park. The district also includes the original lightkeeper's house.

The district was added to the National Register of Historic Places in 1994.

== See also ==
- National Register of Historic Places listings in Norfolk County, Massachusetts
