= Marshfield Municipal Airport (Massachusetts) =

Marshfield Municipal Airport George Harlow Field
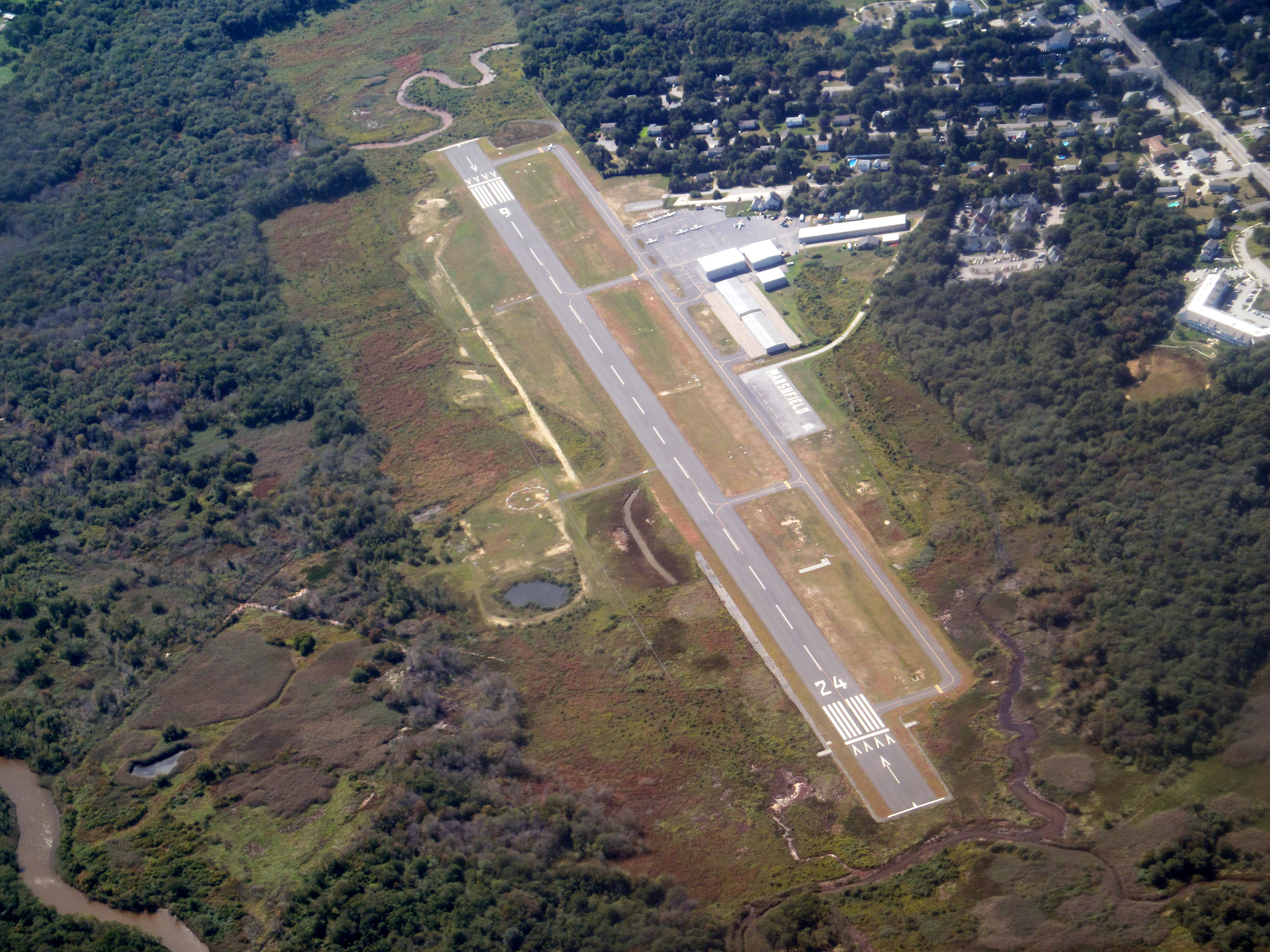
- Marshfield Municipal Airport in September 2015
- IATA: none; ICAO: KGHG; FAA LID: GHG

Summary
- Airport type: Public
- Owner/Operator: Town of Marshfield
- Serves: Marshfield, Massachusetts
- Elevation AMSL: 11 ft / 3 m
- Coordinates: 42°05′54″N 070°40′20″W
- Website: marshfield-ma.gov

Map
- Interactive map of Marshfield Municipal Airport

Runways
Direction	Length		Surface
Direction	ft	m	Surface
6/24	3,900	1,188	Asphalt

Marshfield Municipal Airport (ICAO: KGHG, FAA LID: GHG), also known as George Harlow Field, is a public airport located 2 mi (3 km) east of the central business district (CBD) of Marshfield, a town in Plymouth County, Massachusetts, USA. Formerly, it had the ICAO code 3B2.

Prior to 1965 the airport was privately owned and dated back to the 1940s. The Town of Marshfield acquired the airport in 1965 through a Town Meeting vote. The total cost of the acquisition was $118,848. Improvement, including the pavement of the runway and building additions were made since acquisition.

Today, the airport is publicly owned by the Town of Marshfield and operated by Shoreline Aviation, the airport's fixed-base operator (FBO). It has one runway (06/24) 3900' long and 100' wide. The airport averages 50 movements per day, and has approximately 48 aircraft based on its field. There are four non-precision approaches to the field: two GPS and two PAPI. The U.S. Coast Guard, State Police, National Guard, and other local agencies fly out of Marshfield airport for search and rescue operations, fire patrol, emergency medical transport, law enforcement activities, and wildlife and environmental monitoring flights.

== See also ==
- List of airports in Massachusetts
