= Minot, Massachusetts =

Section of Scituate, Massachusetts, USA

Coordinates: 42°14′25″N 70°45′43″W

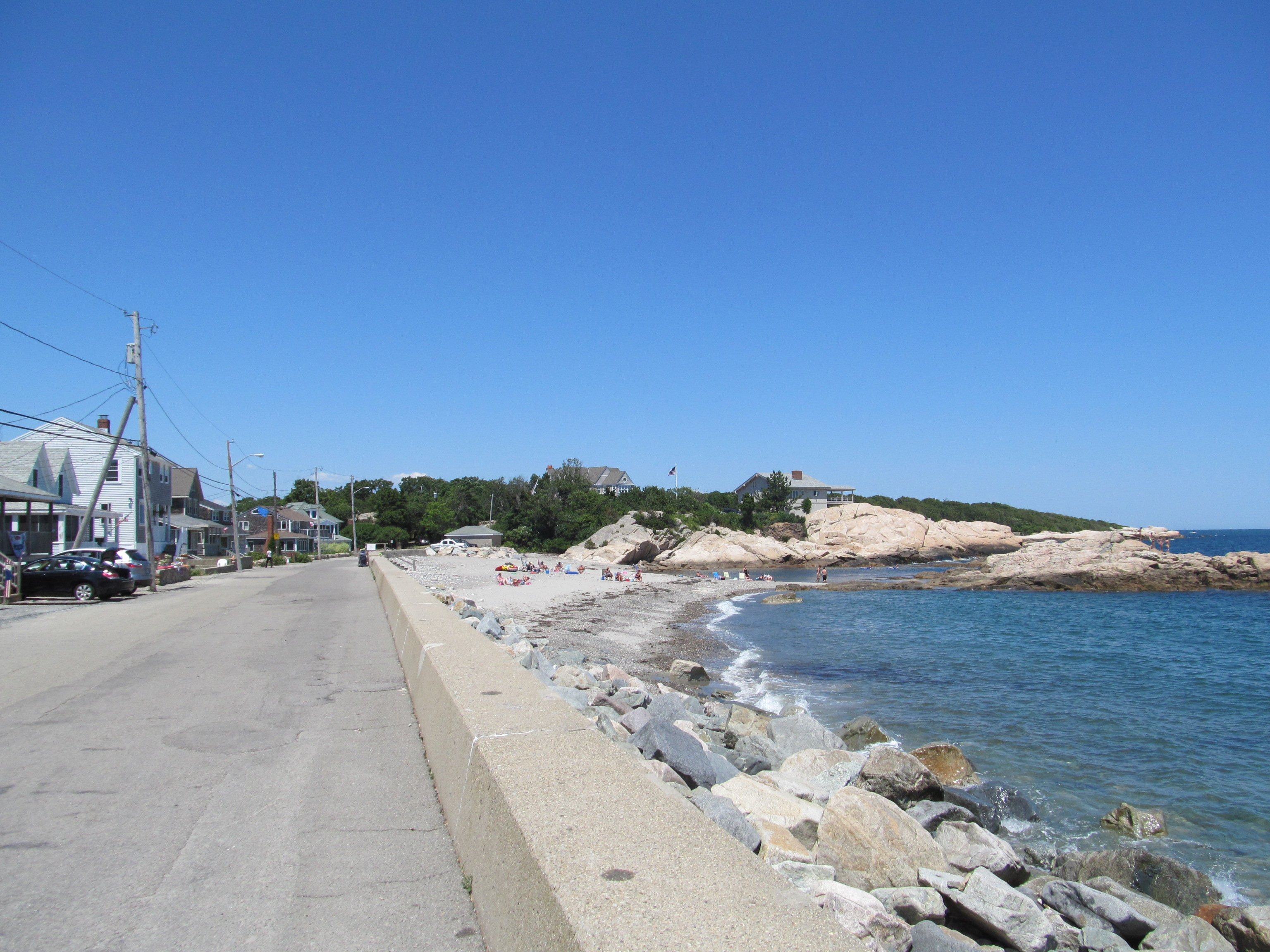
Glades Road

Minot is a section of Scituate, Massachusetts. Minot's ZIP Code is 02055.

Minot is a beach community in Scituate. It is fondly regarded as the best beach in Scituate. It is part North Scituate and is further divided into an area of private property called "The Glades." Minot consists of the homes from the intersection of Hatherly Road and Gannett Road (known as "The Lights") to the ocean (main entrance known as "The Gates").

Two beaches are in Minot. North Scituate beach, the southernmost beach, is bordered to the south by Egypt Beach (part of the Egypt section of Scituate) and to the North by the second beach, Minot. Minot Beach is unique to other Scituate Beaches by virtue of its large rock landmarks, Well Rock and Bar Rock. Well Rock is so named due to an open channel (or "Well") from its base to its apex. Under certain tidal conditions, sea water would enter the lower opening and spout up through the apex giving the formation a whale-like appearance. Well Rock's well has diminished over years of increasing sand deposition at its base. Bar Rock, under certain rare tidal conditions, had an exposed sand and gravel bar leading to its location approximately 100 yards offshore. Locals would utilize this "bar" to access the rock in order to paint graffiti (e.g. high school class graduation year) on its shore-facing side. Like Well Rock, Bar Rock has been changed, it remoteness reduced, by progressive sand deposition at the beach.

Minot has its own post office with limited hours. A former Scituate fire station on Mitchell Avenue was sold by the town at auction for $585,000 in 2021.

Public school children in Minot attend Wampatuck Elementary School, Lester J. Gates Intermediate School, and Scituate High School.

Minot has no businesses. Hatherly Country Club, a private club and golf course for members only, is located on Hatherly Road, spread across Minot and North Scituate.

On the evening of March 24, 2023, a fire broke out on Glades Road which quickly spread to engulf 8 beachfront homes. Five of the homes suffered extensive damage, with one needing to be demolished the next day. Eight fire departments responded to fight the blaze, which took until the next day to fully extinguish. Early theories stated that the fire may have started in a dumpster near a condo building.
