= Scituate, Massachusetts =

Town in Massachusetts, United States

- Town
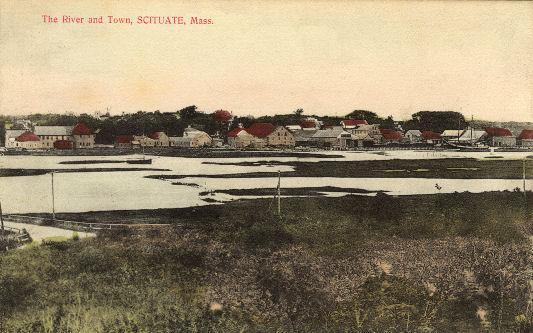
- Scituate Harbor

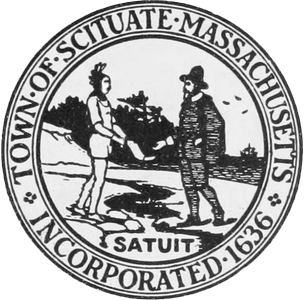
- Seal

- Location in Plymouth County in Massachusetts
- Coordinates: 42°11′45″N 70°43′35″W
- Country: United States
- State: Massachusetts
- County: Plymouth
- Settled: 1630
- Incorporated: 1636

Government
  - Type: Open town meeting
  - Town Administrator: James Boudreau

Area
  - Total: 31.8 sq mi (82.4 km^{2})
  - Land: 17.6 sq mi (45.7 km^{2})
  - Water: 14.2 sq mi (36.8 km^{2})
- Elevation: 30 ft (9 m)

Population (2020)
  - Total: 19,063
  - Density: 1,080/sq mi (417.1/km^{2})
- Time zone: UTC−05:00 (Eastern)
  - Summer (DST): UTC−04:00 (Eastern)
- ZIP Codes: 02066 (Scituate); 02040, 02055 (P.O. boxes); 02047 (Humarock); 02060 (North Scituate)
- Area code: 339 / 781
- FIPS code: 25-60330
- GNIS feature ID: 0618352
- Website: www.scituatema.gov

Scituate (/ˈsɪtʃuɪt/) is a seacoast town in Plymouth County, Massachusetts, United States, on the South Shore, midway between Boston and Plymouth. The population was 19,063 at the 2020 census.

== History ==
The area was inhabited by Indigenous peoples for thousands of years, with archaeological evidence from southeastern Massachusetts indicating human presence dating back over 10,000 years (Paleo-Indian through Woodland periods). At the time of European contact in the 17th century, the region was part of Wampanoag territory. The name Scituate is derived from "satuit", an Indian word understood by early English settlers to mean "cold brook"; it refers to the brook that runs into the town's inner harbor (early spellings included Sityate, Cituate, and Seteat).

The English settlement of Scituate began in the late 1620s. According to the town’s historical overview, a group of English settlers from Plymouth along with immigrants from Kent, England, formed the first permanent settlement in 1627 or 1628. The settlers established a village inland from the coast and laid out a public road known as Kent Street. House lots were assigned along the street to members of the settlement. The Massachusetts Historical Commission’s town survey also identifies Kent Street as the location of the settlement’s original center. The survey describes a pattern of early homes near the harbor and along the nearby cliffs.They were initially governed by the General Court of Plymouth Colony. On October 5, 1636, the town was incorporated as a separate entity.

The town’s earliest surviving records date to 1633. Betty Miessner’s account for the Scituate Historical Society lists settlers from that year onward and notes that evidence for residents before 1633 is limited. The account identifies Anthony Annable, William Gilson, Humphrey Turner, and Timothy Hatherly among the people associated with the early settlement. Annable received a four-acre parcel in 1633 south of Satuit Brook, near the meetinghouse common. William Gilson received a land grant on April 12, 1633, and his house lot was on Kent Street near the brook. He also held land on Second and Third Cliffs.Humphrey Turner, a tanner, held a house lot south of Satuit Brook and a farm near the Colman Hills. These grants and property descriptions document the location of early homes and farms.

Timothy Hatherly became a permanent resident by 1634. He acquired a large tract north of Satuit Brook near the harbor, known as the Conihasset Grant. The grant was initially associated with Hatherly and other grantees. In 1646, Hatherly divided the tract into shares for other landholders. The town’s historical overview describes the division of the grant and the later formation of the Conihasset Partners, who maintained their own roads and records. The grant’s boundaries and ownership were part of the early development of landholding in the area.

Religious organization was another feature of the settlement. Reverend John Lothropp arrived in Scituate in September 1634 with members of his congregation. Historical records compiled by the Scituate Historical Society identify residents, including Annable, Gilson, and Turner, as members of the group associated with the early church. The Massachusetts Historical Commission’s survey records the construction of a meetinghouse in 1636. In 1639, Lothropp and members of his congregation moved to Barnstable. Other Scituate residents also relocated to Barnstable during the late 1630s and early 1640s, according to the historical society’s account. Among the settlers who arrived during this period were members of the Tilden group, who traveled from Kent aboard the ship Hercules in 1634 or 1635.

Scituate received permission in 1636 to elect certain local officers and manage some of its own affairs.The town’s historical overview describes this change as the beginning of local government and gives the boundaries established for the town. The Scituate Historical Society also lists 1636 as the year of incorporation. The early settlement therefore developed from a village organized around Kent Street into a town with local officers, a meetinghouse, and landholding arrangements that extended beyond the original settlement.

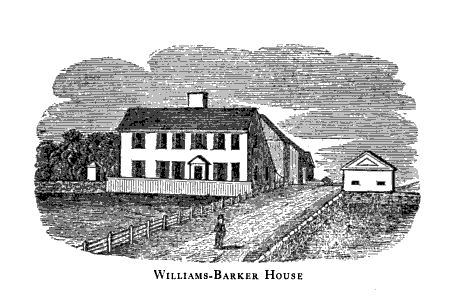
Williams-Barker House (now Barker Tavern) was supposedly built in 1634, making it one of oldest buildings in Massachusetts.

The Williams-Barker House, which still remains near the harbor, is believed to have been built in 1634. Twelve homes and a sawmill were destroyed in King Philip's War in 1676. In 1710, several Europeans from Scituate emigrated to Rhode Island and founded Scituate, Rhode Island.

In 1717, the western portion of the original land grant was separated and incorporated as the town of Hanover, and in 1788, a section of the town was ceded to Marshfield. In 1849, another western section became the town of South Scituate, which later changed its name to Norwell. Since then, the borders have remained essentially unchanged.

Fishing was a significant part of the local economy in the past, as was the sea mossing industry. The sea was historically an integral part of the town with occasional incidents such as that described February 13, 1894, in which eight men clinging to the vessel's rigging on a schooner grounded off Third Cliff apparently died before a large crowd watching from shore "literally frozen to the ropes" while unsuccessful rescue efforts continued through the day and their apparently lifeless bodies were covered by nightfall. A small fishing fleet is still based in Scituate Harbor, although today the town is mostly residential.

In 1810, a lighthouse was erected on the northern edge of Scituate Harbor. This lighthouse is now known as Old Scituate Light. During the War of 1812, a British naval raiding party having landed on the beach near the lighthouse was deterred by the two daughters of the lighthouse keeper. The young girls, Abigail and Rebecca Bates, marched to and fro behind sand dunes playing a fife and drum loudly. The British invaders were duped into thinking that the American army was approaching and fled. The girls and this incident became known as the "American Army of Two" or "Lighthouse Army of Two". Descendants of the Bates family still remain in Scituate.

Another notable lighthouse, Minot's Ledge Light, stands approximately one mile (1.6 km) off Scituate Neck. The Minot’s Ledge Lighthouse (also known as Minot’s Light) has been nicknamed the "I Love You Lighthouse" due to the 1–4–3 pattern that its light repeatedly emits.

Samuel Woodworth's Old Oaken Bucket house is located in Scituate. The town is also home to the Lawson Tower, a water tower surrounded by a wooden façade, with an observation deck with views of most of the South Shore from the top.

Financier and muckraker Thomas Lawson built his Dreamworld estate in Scituate. The Lawson Tower remains and the Dreamworld condominium complex pays tribute.

During World War II, the Fourth Cliff Military Reservation defended the Scituate area with a battery of two 6-inch guns. It is now a recreation area for Hanscom Air Force Base.

Scituate used to be the site of international broadcasting radio station WNYW, which broadcast on the shortwave bands in the late 1960s.

== Geography ==
According to the United States Census Bureau, the town has a total area of 31.8 square miles (82.4 km^{2}), of which 17.6 square miles (45.7 km^{2}) is land and 14.2 square miles (36.8 km^{2}), or 44.60%, is water. Scituate is bordered on the east by Massachusetts Bay, on the south by Marshfield, on the west by Norwell and Hingham, all of which are in Plymouth County, and on the northwest by Cohasset, in Norfolk County. The town is 19 miles (31 km) northeast of Brockton and 25 miles (40 km) southeast of Boston.

Scituate is considered a South Shore community, located just south of the mouth of greater Boston Harbor. The town is not contiguous; Humarock is a part of Scituate which can only be reached from Marshfield. The latter was formerly connected to the town, but that connection was lost when the mouth of the South River shifted northward as the result of the Portland Gale of 1898. The town's shore varies, with the south (along the mouth of the North River) being surrounded by salt marshes, the middle (around Scituate Harbor) being sandy, and the coast of Scituate Neck (Minot) in the north exhibiting exposed granite bedrock. It is off these rocks that Minot's Ledge lies, home to the town's most famous lighthouse. The inland of the town is mostly wooded, with several brooks and rivers (including Satuit or "Cold Brook", for which the town is named) running through.

Scituate has five public beaches: Minot, Sand Hills, Egypt, Peggotty, and Humarock.

The town has no freeways running through it; Massachusetts Route 3 runs through neighboring Norwell. Route 3A runs through the town, and is known as Chief Justice Cushing Highway for this stretch, named for Chief Justice William Cushing (1732–1810). The only other state highway in town is Route 123, which terminates at Route 3A, just 0.7 miles (1.1 km) from the town line.

There is no air service in town; the closest regional airport is Marshfield Municipal Airport, and the closest national and international air service is at Logan International Airport in Boston. There are two MBTA commuter rail stations. One is just off Route 3A in North Scituate, and the other is just east of the intersection of Routes 3A and 123 in the Greenbush neighborhood, which is the line's eastern terminus. The line is connected to an existing line in Braintree, providing service to South Station in Boston.

Named places in the town include:

- Egypt
- First Cliff
- Greenbush (Green Bush)
- Hatherly
- Humarock
- Lawson Tower, a historic water tower which is visible from several miles out at sea
- Minot, including Minot Beach
- North Scituate (formerly Gannett Corner)
- Peggotty Beach
- Rivermoor
- Second Cliff
- Shore Acres
- Sodham
- The Glades
- Sand Hills
- The Connolly House
- Third Cliff
- Kent Village
- The West End
- The Spit
- The Point (original name of the Spit)
- Driftway

"The Harbor" refers to the business district as well as the harbor itself. Scituate Harbor is used mostly by pleasure boaters and fishermen.

At one time, dozens of commercial fishermen lived in Scituate, but the number has dwindled to just a handful.

== Demographics ==
Historical population
Year	Pop.	±%
1790	2,856	—
1850	2,149	−24.8%
1860	2,227	+3.6%
1870	2,350	+5.5%
1880	2,466	+4.9%
1890	2,318	−6.0%
1900	2,470	+6.6%
1910	2,482	+0.5%
1920	2,534	+2.1%
1930	3,118	+23.0%
1940	4,130	+32.5%
1950	5,993	+45.1%
1960	11,214	+87.1%
1970	16,973	+51.4%
1980	17,317	+2.0%
1990	16,786	−3.1%
2000	17,863	+6.4%
2010	18,133	+1.5%
2020	19,063	+5.1%
2024*	19,598	+2.8%
* = population estimate. Source: United States census records and Population Estimates Program data.

As of the census of 2010, there were 18,133 people, 6,694 households, and 4,920 families residing in the town. The population density was 1,039.6 inhabitants per square mile (401.4/km^{2}). There were 7,685 housing units at an average density of 447.3 per square mile (172.7/km^{2}). The racial makeup of the town was 96.1% White, 0.8% Black or African American, 0.1% Native American, 0.8% Asian, 0.01% Pacific Islander, 1.4% from other races, and 0.9% from two or more races. Hispanic or Latino of any race were 0.83% of the population.

There were 6,694 households, out of which 34.4% had children under the age of 18 living with them, 62.5% were married couples living together, 8.2% had a female householder with no husband present, and 26.5% were non-families. 22.2% of all households were made up of individuals, and 10.4% had someone living alone who was 65 years of age or older. The average household size was 2.64 and the average family size was 3.13.

In the town, the population was spread out, with 26.1% under the age of 18, 4.2% from 18 to 24, 27.7% from 25 to 44, 26.8% from 45 to 64, and 15.3% who were 65 years of age or older. The median age was 41 years. For every 100 females, there were 91.3 males. For every 100 females age 18 and over, there were 87.9 males.

The median income for a household in the town was $70,868, and the median income for a family was $86,058 (these figures had risen to $86,723 and $108,138 respectively as of a 2010 estimate)16. Males had a median income of $60,322 versus $40,200 for females. The per capita income for the town was $33,940. About 1.4% of families and 2.6% of the population were below the poverty line, including 1.5% of those under age 18 and 4.8% of those age 65 or over.

== Climate ==
In a typical year, Scituate's temperatures fall below 50 °F (10 °C) for 184 days per year. Annual precipitation is typically 46.4 inches (1,180 mm) per year (high for the US). It may be helpful to understand the yearly precipitation by imagining nine straight days of moderate rain per year. The humidity is below 60% for approximately 34.4 days, or 9.4% of the year.

The town is highly prone to the effects of nor'easters, major storms that slam the region every winter. The strongest of these storms can produce devastating coastal flooding and hurricane force winds in Scituate and other coastal Massachusetts towns.

== Transportation ==
There are no divided highways that run through Scituate, but there are two state roads, Route 3A and Route 123. The nearest airport to Scituate is Marshfield Municipal Airport. The nearest national and international air service can be reached at Logan International Airport in Boston. T. F. Green Airport, located outside Providence, Rhode Island, is an alternative to Logan, although it is located farther away.

The Greenbush Line of the MBTA Commuter Rail begins in Scituate with the Greenbush station, proceeds north to Scituate's second stop, in North Scituate, where it continues to Cohasset and Hingham and finally South Station in Boston. The ride into Boston lasts approximately forty-five minutes.

In late 2015, the GATRA bus program was implemented in Scituate. The program provides low-cost bus transportation within the town.

== Government ==
On the national level, Scituate is a part of Massachusetts's 8th congressional district, and is currently represented by Stephen Lynch.

On the state level, all of Scituate's voting precincts are represented in the Massachusetts House of Representatives as a part of the Fourth Plymouth district, which also includes the town of Marshfield. Patrick Kearney was elected on November 6, 2018, as the state representative for these precincts. He will replace Jim Cantwell, who resigned to take a job with Ed Markey. Kearney was sworn in on January 2, 2019. The town is represented in the Massachusetts Senate as a part of the Plymouth and Norfolk district, which includes the towns of Cohasset, Duxbury, Hingham, Hull, Marshfield Norwell and Weymouth.

Scituate is governed on the local level by the open town meeting form of government, and is led by a town administrator,James Boudreau, and a board of selectmen. The town hall, police and fire station 3 are all located in buildings along Route 3A, just down the street from the traditional center of town. There is also a firehouse in Humarock and the Fire Headquarters is on First Parish Rd near Scituate Harbor. Emergency services are also provided by the town, with the nearest hospitals being located in Quincy, Weymouth, Plymouth, and Brockton. There are four post offices throughout the town, located in Humarock, near the harbor, in North Scituate and in Greenbush. The Scituate Town Library is located near Scituate Center, and is a member of the Old Colony Library Network (OCLN). The town also operates a highway department, as well as several parks, beaches and marinas. The Coast Guard also has a station at Scituate Harbor.

In 2002, Scituate voters adopted the Community Preservation Act (CPA) for the acquisition, preservation, restoration or creation of open space, historical purposes, land for recreational use and the creation and support of community housing.

Since then, voters have approved funding for many noteworthy projects: restoration of historic treasures like Lawson Tower, Cudworth House, and Stockbridge Mill, and Old Scituate Light; purchase of increasingly threatened open space—more than 400 acres to date containing much wildlife and scenic trails; acquisition of the Mordecai Lincoln Homestead on the Gulf River (owned by Abraham Lincoln's great, great, great grandfather); and construction of recreational facilities at Hatherly and Cushing Schools, the athletic complex at Scituate High School, and several playgrounds and sports fields around town.

Voter Registration and Party Enrollment as of August 24, 2024
Party	Number of Voters	Percentage
Democratic	3,624	24.24%
Republican	1,987	15.42%
Libertarian	39	0.23%
Minor Parties	141	0.95%
Unenrolled	10,832	59.16%
Total	16,586	100%

== Education ==
Scituate's public schools provide co-ed classes for grades K–12. Hatherly Elementary School, Cushing Elementary School, Wampatuck Elementary School and (the most recently opened) Jenkins Elementary School serve grades K–5, the newly opened Lester J. Gates Middle School, which bears the same name as the old Intermediate school, serves grades six through eight and was opened just in time for the 2017–2018 school year. Scituate High School serves 9–12. Scituate High's teams are known as the Sailors, and their colors are blue, white, and black. The teams compete in the MIAA's Divisions 2 and 3, in the Patriot League. Their chief rivals are Norwell and Cohasset, whom they border, and Hingham, whom they play in their annual Thanksgiving Day football game.

High school students may also choose to attend South Shore Vocational Technical High School in Hanover free of charge. Also, many students, specifically in high school, commute to private schools in and around Boston, most commonly, Thayer Academy and Archbishop Williams in Braintree, Boston College High School (boys only) in Dorchester, and Notre Dame Academy (girls only) in Hingham. Boston College High enrolled 61 young men from Scituate in the 2005–06 school year.

== Culture ==
=== St. Patrick's Day Parade ===
The annual St. Patrick's Day Parade takes place on the third Sunday in March and runs from Greenbush-Driftway to Scituate Harbor. In addition to the parade, the celebration includes the Mad Hatter's Ball, the Annual Mayor's Race, and the St. Pat's Plunge into the chilly Atlantic Ocean at Peggotty Beach. These events are fundraisers for local charities. With nearly 50% of Scituate residents being of Irish descent, St. Patrick's Day festivities are a local favorite.

According to the official parade website, the parade began in Minot, Massachusetts, in 1995 as a small procession around the block to celebrate St. Patrick's Day.

=== Heritage Days ===
An annual outdoor event in the Scituate Harbor area featuring live music, entertainment, artisan crafts, kids activities and historical site visits. The event takes place for one weekend in the month of August.

Scituate is mentioned as a good fishing spot in Nathaniel Hawthorne's short story, The Village Uncle.

== Sister cities ==
Scituate has three sister cities:

- Santa Catarina do Fogo, Cape Verde
- Sucy-en-Brie, France
- (Republic of Ireland) West Cork, Ireland

== Notable people ==
- Abigail Bates, half of the "American Army of Two," fended off the British army near the Scituate lighthouse with a fife and drum during the War of 1812 (Fortier, Edmund A, An Army of Two Saves the Day) along with Rebecca
- Rebecca Bates, other half of the "American Army of Two"
- Brittany Brown, International Ladies Professional Wrestling multi-time champion and title holder. Brown was Trained by the legendary Killer Kowalski and WWF/WWE long-time Women’s Champion The Fabulous Moolah. Brown was born and raised in Scituate, MA near Scituate Harbor
- Gridley Bryant, builder of the first commercial railroad in the United States and inventor of most of the basic technologies involved in it
- George W. Casey, Jr., Chief of Staff of the United States Army (2007–2011)
- Thomas Clapp, first President of Yale University
- Jesse Cole, inventor of Banana Ball and commissioner of the Banana Ball Championship League
- Paul Curtis, shipbuilder known for his clipper ships
- William Cushing, one of the original six justices on the United States Supreme Court
- Casey Dienel, singer-songwriter known as White Hinterland
- Ryan Donato, NHL left wing for the Chicago Blackhawks
- Ted Donato, former Harvard hockey captain with a 13-year NHL career; won an NCAA championship, played in the Olympics, coaches Harvard hockey
- Henry Dunster, first president of Harvard University, Puritan/Baptist minister
- Tom Fitzgerald, sports journalist with The Boston Globe and recipient of the Lester Patrick Trophy and Elmer Ferguson Memorial Award
- Nick Flynn, writer and poet, whose autobiographical Another Bullshit Night in Suck City was adapted into the 2012 film Being Flynn
- Jacques Futrelle, journalist, author, who died in the sinking of the RMS Titanic in 1912; his wife, fellow writer and Titanic survivor May Futrelle (née Lily May Peel); and their two children
- Conor Garland, NHL winger for the Vancouver Canucks
- Joe Gaziano, NFL Defensive End
- Mark Goddard, actor known for his role as "Major Don West" in the series Lost in Space
- Inez Haynes Irwin, journalist, author, feminist, wrote The Story of the Women's Party, a history of the American woman suffrage movement
- Charles Kerins, artist, illustrator, known for Red Sox yearbook covers and paintings of small town American childhood in the 1950s and 1960s
- Anna Konkle, comedian, raised in Scituate
- Bruce Laird, former NFL football player for Baltimore Colts, 1972–1981 (Pro Bowl 1972), and San Diego Chargers, 1982–1983
- Thomas W. Lawson, stock promoter, financial reformer, built his Dreamwold estate in Scituate
- Mordecai Lincoln Sr., great-great-great-grandfather of U.S. President Abraham Lincoln
- Mordecai Lincoln Jr., great-great-grandfather of U.S. President Abraham Lincoln
- Jim Lonborg, Cy Young Award–winning former Major League Baseball starting pitcher for the Boston Red Sox
- Joseph D. Malone, former Massachusetts treasurer
- Tom McCall, Governor of Oregon from 1966–1974, born in Scituate
- John McDonald, Major League Baseball infielder
- Mike Macdonald, Seattle Seahawks head coach and Baltimore Ravens defensive coordinator. He was the Seahawks' coach when they won Super Bowl LX.
- Scott McMorrow, award-winning playwright and poet
- Mike Palm, (relief pitcher) 1948 Boston Red Sox
- Frank Craig Pandolfe, retired Vice Admiral United States Navy (1980–2017)
- Thomas William Parsons (1819–1892), American dentist and poet ended his days in Scituate
- Walter Jay Skinner, U.S. federal district judge, presided over Anderson v. Cryovac, Inc., private practice in Scituate, 1957–1963
- Dave Silk, former NHL ice hockey forward, member of the Miracle on Ice 1980 U.S. Olympic hockey team that won the gold medal
- Scott Snibbe, media artist, grew up in Scituate
- Billy Tibbetts, former NHL forward
- Peter Tolan, writer, director
- Charles Turner Torrey, abolitionist (1813–1846)
- May Rogers Webster, naturalist born in Scituate
- Ryan Whitney, former NHL defenseman, host of podcast “Spittin' Chiclets”

== Gallery ==
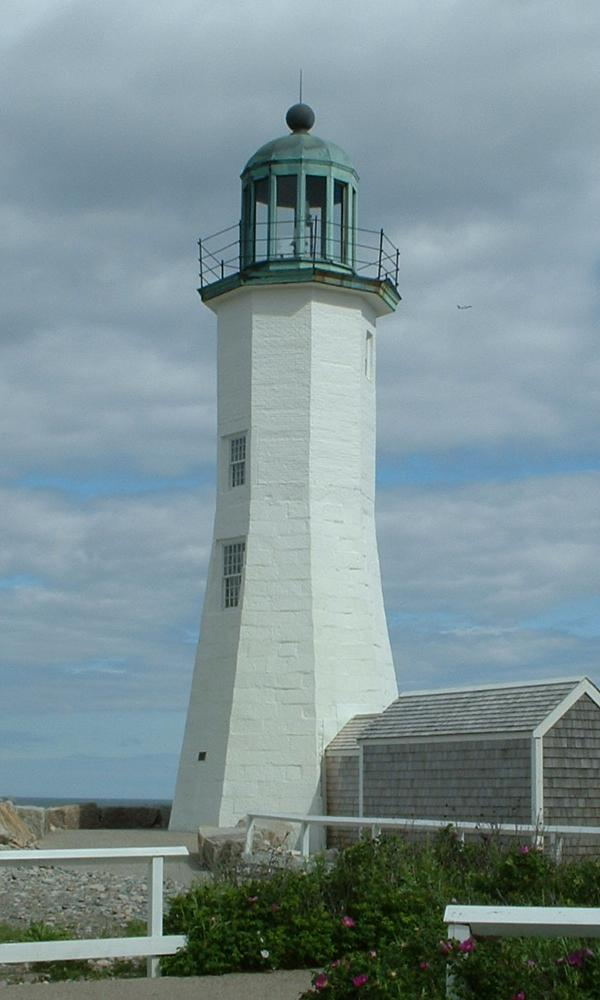
Scituate Lighthouse, Scituate Harbor

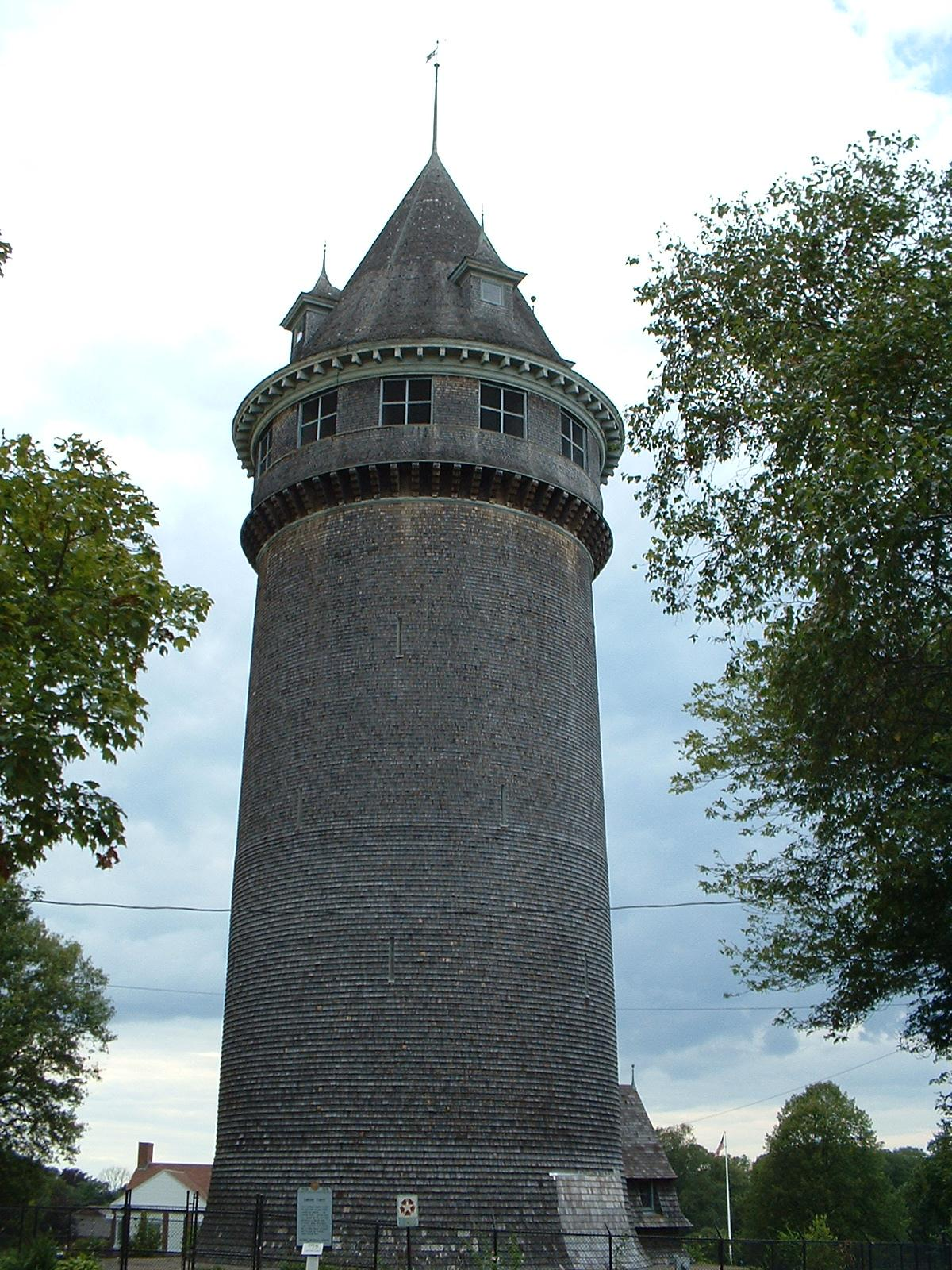
Lawson Tower, Scituate Center

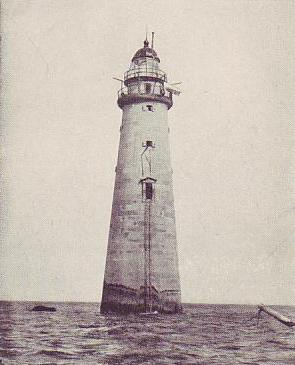
Minot Ledge Light c. 1905

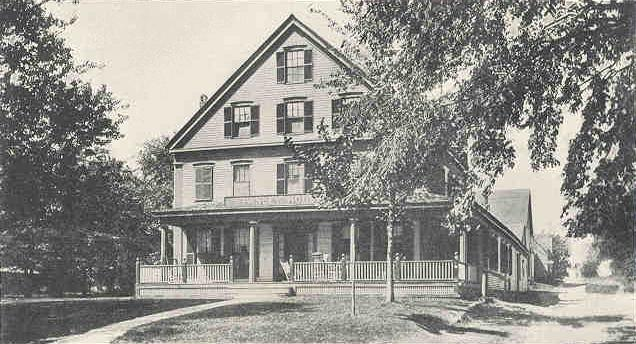
Stanley House c. 1905

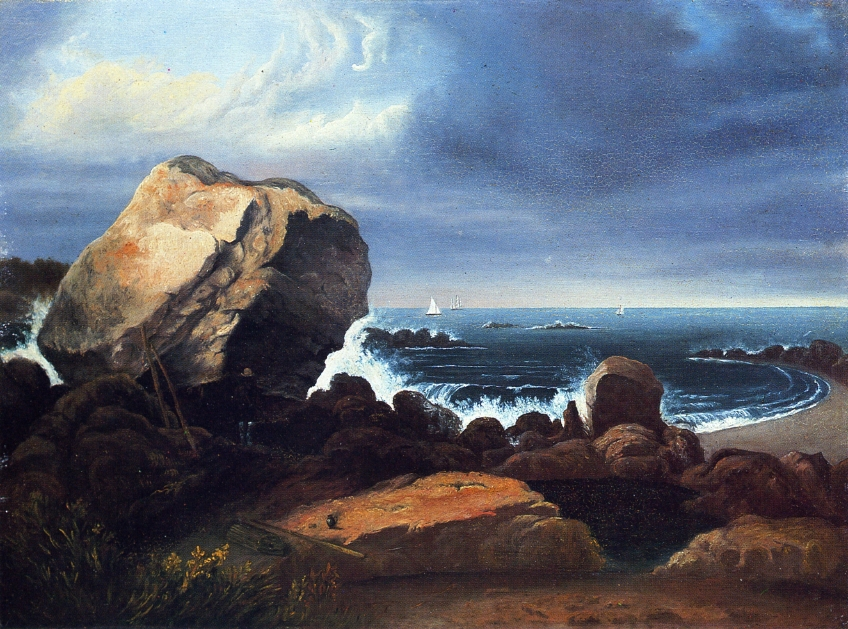
Scituate Beach, Massachusetts, Thomas Doughty, 1837
