= Old Scituate Light =

Historic lighthouse Scituate, Massachusetts, United States

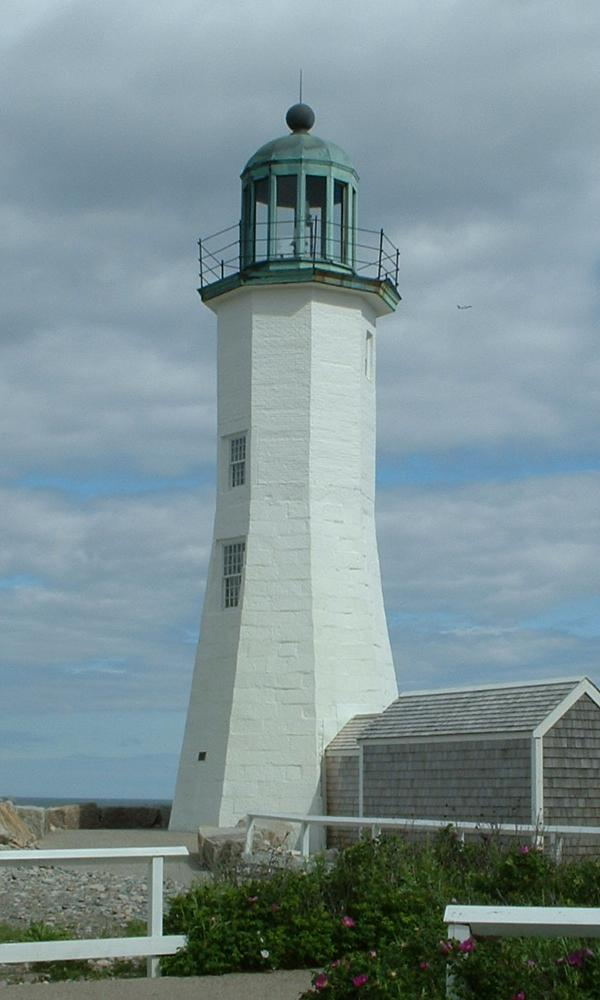
- Old Scituate Light in Scituate
- Location: Cedar Point, Scituate Harbor, Scituate, Massachusetts
- Coordinates: 42°12′17.1″N 70°42′57″W

Tower
- Constructed: 1811
- Foundation: Natural/emplaced
- Construction: Granite/brick
- Height: 25 feet (7.6 m), 70 feet (21 m) above sea level
- Shape: Octagonal
- Markings: white with green lantern room roof
- Heritage: National Register of Historic Places listed place

Light
- First lit: 1811
- Deactivated: 1860–1994
- Focal height: 15 m (49 ft)
- Lens: Pan lamp 1811, Fresnel lens 1855
- Characteristic: Flashing white 15s, private aid
- Scituate Light
- U.S. National Register of Historic Places
- Area: 1.2 acres (0.49 ha)
- MPS: Lighthouses of Massachusetts TR
- NRHP reference No.: 87001490
- Added to NRHP: June 15, 1987

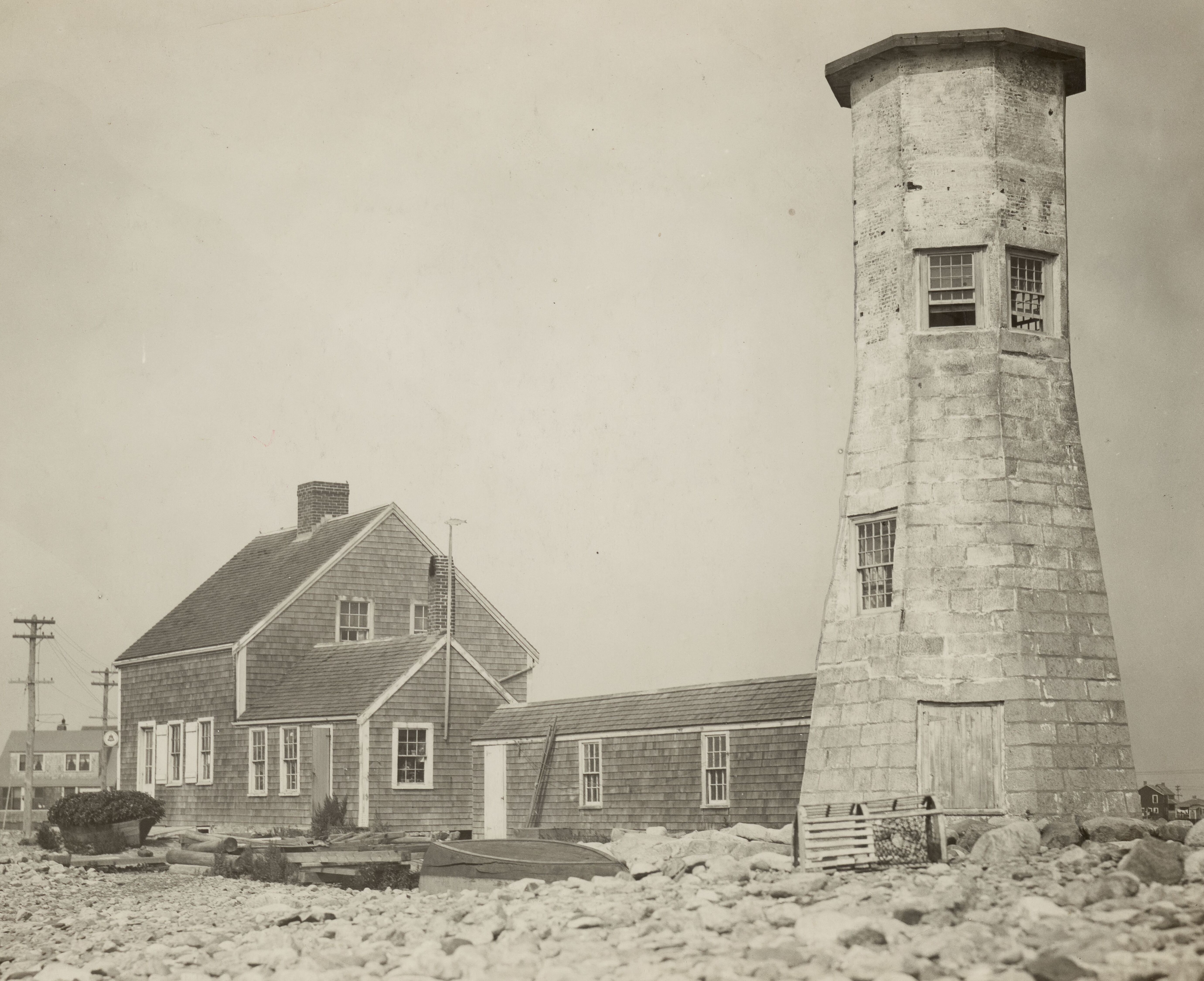
Old Scituate Light (built in 1811) in 1927

Old Scituate Light also known simply as Scituate Light is a historic lighthouse located on Cedar Point in Scituate, Massachusetts. It was added to the National Register of Historic Places in 1987 as Scituate Light.

== History ==
In May, 1810, the US government appropriated $4,000 for a lighthouse to be built at the entrance of Scituate Harbor. The lighthouse was completed two months ahead of schedule, on September 19, 1811, making it the 11th lighthouse in the United States. In September, 1814, during the War of 1812, Rebecca and Abagail Bates ("The Lighthouse Army of Two") warded off an attack by British soldiers by playing their fife and drum loudly. The British retreated since they thought the sound came from the Scituate town militia.

In 1850, the lighthouse was removed from service due to the construction of the Minot's Ledge Light. It was put back into service in 1852, after a storm destroyed the first Minot's Ledge Light, and it received a new Fresnel lens in 1855. In 1860, the light was once again removed from service after the second tower at Minot's Ledge was built. Over the next 60 years, the lighthouse fell into disrepair.

In 1916, the lighthouse was put up for sale, and in 1917, it was purchased by the town of Scituate for $4,000.

In 1930, a new replica lantern was added. In 1962, the lighthouse was in a state of disrepair. The Scituate Historical Society appropriated $6,500 for repairs. The lighthouse was placed on the National Register of Historic Places in 1988. In 1991, the lighthouse was relit with the light visible only from land; the light was made visible from sea as a private aid to navigation in 1994.

In October 2022 the lantern room was removed from the top of the tower as part of a $2M renovation of the lighthouse. The lantern room will be completely reconstructed along with other renovations to the interior of the tower.

Occasional tours are available from the Scituate Historical Society. The keeper's house is a private residence. The current keeper is Bob Gallagher, a history teacher at Marshfield High School in Marshfield, Massachusetts.

== See also ==
- National Register of Historic Places listings in Plymouth County, Massachusetts
- List of lighthouses in Massachusetts
