= Minot's Ledge Light =

Lighthouse in Massachusetts, US

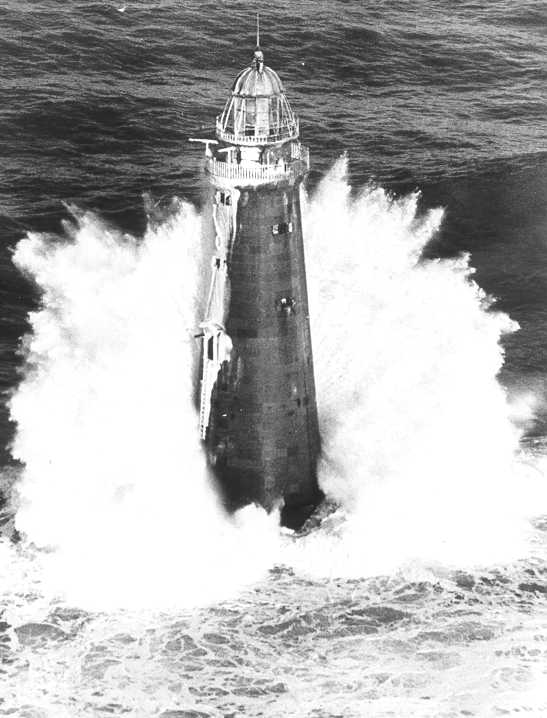
- Minots Light in a storm
- Location: Offshore Scituate, Massachusetts
- Coordinates: 42°16′11″N 70°45′33″W

Tower
- Constructed: 1850 (first tower)
- Foundation: Stone ledge
- Construction: Granite
- Automated: 1947
- Height: 87 feet (27 m)
- Shape: Conical
- Heritage: National Register of Historic Places listed place, Historic Civil Engineering Landmark
- Fog signal: Horn: 1 every 10s

Light
- First lit: 1860 (current tower)
- Deactivated: 1851-1860
- Focal height: 85 feet (26 m)
- Lens: 3rd order Fresnel lens (original), 300 millimetres (12 in) (current)
- Range: 10 nmi (19 km; 12 mi)
- Characteristic: Flashing white (1+4+3) 45s
- Minot's Ledge Light
- U.S. National Register of Historic Places
- Location: Minots Ledge, Scituate, Massachusetts
- Area: 0.1 acres (0.040 ha)
- Built: 1855
- Architect: Totten, Gen. Joseph D.; Alexander, Lt. Barton S.
- MPS: Lighthouses of Massachusetts TR
- NRHP reference No.: 87001489
- Added to NRHP: June 15, 1987

Minot's Ledge Light, officially Minots Ledge Light, is a lighthouse on Minots Ledge, one mile offshore of the towns of Cohasset and Scituate, Massachusetts, to the southeast of Boston Harbor. The current lighthouse is the second on the site, the first having been washed away in a storm after only a few months of use.

== First lighthouse ==
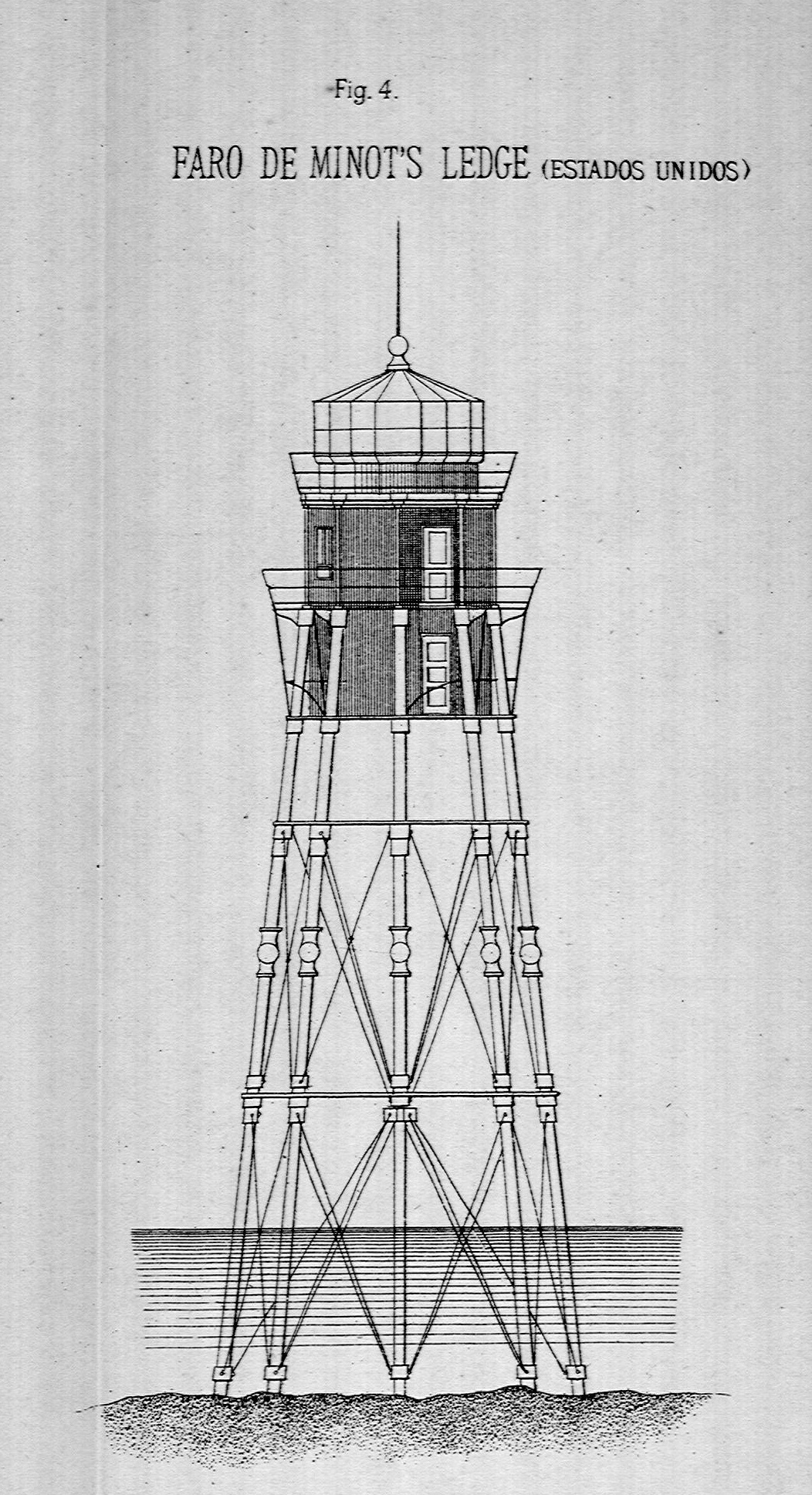
First Minot's Ledge Lighthouse, as per drawing by José Eugenio Ribera.

In 1843, lighthouse inspector I. W. P. Lewis compiled a report on Minots Ledge, showing that more than 40 vessels had been lost due to striking the ledge from 1832 to 1841, with serious loss of life and damage to property. The most dramatic incident was the sinking of a ship "St John" in October 1849 with ninety-nine Irish immigrants, who all drowned within sight of their new homeland. It was initially proposed to build a lighthouse similar to John Smeaton's pioneering Eddystone Lighthouse, situated off the south-west coast of England. However Captain William H. Swift, put in charge of planning the tower, believed it impossible to build such a tower on the mostly submerged ledge. Instead he successfully argued for an iron pile light, a spidery structure drilled into the rock.

The first Minot's Ledge Lighthouse was built between 1847 and 1850, and was lighted for the first time on January 1, 1850. One night in April 1851, the new lighthouse was struck by a major storm that caused damage throughout the Boston area. The following day only a few bent pilings were found on the rock. The two assistant keepers who had been tending the lighthouse at the time had died at their posts.

== The current lighthouse ==
Until 1863 the design and construction of lighthouses was the responsibility of the Corps of Topographical Engineers; this resulted in a rivalry with the longer-established Army Corps of Engineers, which built fortifications and had responsibility, as it does today, for waterway improvements. The Chief Engineer of the Army Corps of Engineers, Joseph G. Totten, personally took charge of the project to design and construct a permanent lighthouse on Minot's Ledge.

Totten's design was as simple as it was effective. With extensive experience building fortifications, Totten fully appreciated the permanency and strength of granite constructions. He designed the lighthouse so the first 40 feet of lighthouse would be a solid granite base weighing thousands of tons. To secure the lighthouse to the ledge, he had several massive iron pins emplaced so that the lighthouse would be literally pinned to the ledge by its own weight. Working on the ledge could take place only in conditions when it was exposed at low tide and the sea was calm, so construction took years.

Work started on the current lighthouse in 1855, and it was completed and first lit on November 15, 1860. With a final cost of $300,000, it was the most expensive light house that was ever constructed in the United States to that date. The lighthouse is built of large and heavy dovetailed granite blocks, which were cut and dressed ashore in Quincy and taken to the ledge by ship. The lighthouse was equipped with a third-order Fresnel lens.

The light signal, a 1-4-3 flashing cycle adopted in 1894, is locally referred to as "I LOVE YOU" (1-4-3 being the number of letters in that phrase), and it is often cited as such by romantic couples within its range.

Minots Ledge Light was automated in 1947.

== Historical information ==
The following is taken from the Coast Guard Historian's website:

Minots Ledge is one of many groups of rocky outcroppings off the coast of Cohasset and Scituate, and has been the scene of countless shipwrecks. Between 1832 and 1841 there were 40 wrecks on this and neighboring reefs. Between 1817 and 1847, it was estimated that 40 lives and $364,000 in property had been lost in shipwrecks in the vicinity of Minots Ledge, off Cohasset, Massachusetts.

In 1843, Inspector I. W. P. Lewis, of the Lighthouse Service, emphasized the great need for a lighthouse on Minots Ledge, and his judgment was sustained by Capt. William H. Swift, of the United States Topographical Bureau, who recommended an iron-pile lighthouse as offering less resistance to the waves than a stone tower.

The ledge was barely 20 feet (6.1 m) wide and was exposed at low tide, being dry only 2 or 3 hours a day. On this narrow rock construction was begun in the spring of 1847 of a 75-foot (23 m) open-work iron light structure. The men could only work on very calm days when the tide was at its ebb. The work was conducted from a schooner which remained near the ledge, unless the sea was rough, with the workmen sleeping on board. If a storm threatened, the schooner put into Cohasset Harbor until it was over.

Nine holes were drilled into the solid rock, each 12 inches (300 mm) wide and 5 feet (1.5 m) deep. Eight were placed in a circle, 25 feet (7.6 m) in diameter, with the ninth in the center. Iron piling, 10 inches (250 mm) in diameter were then cemented into each hole. Four men worked in 20-minute shifts at the drilling from a triangle, set on heavy spars, which supported a platform high above the ledge, on which the drilling machinery was installed.

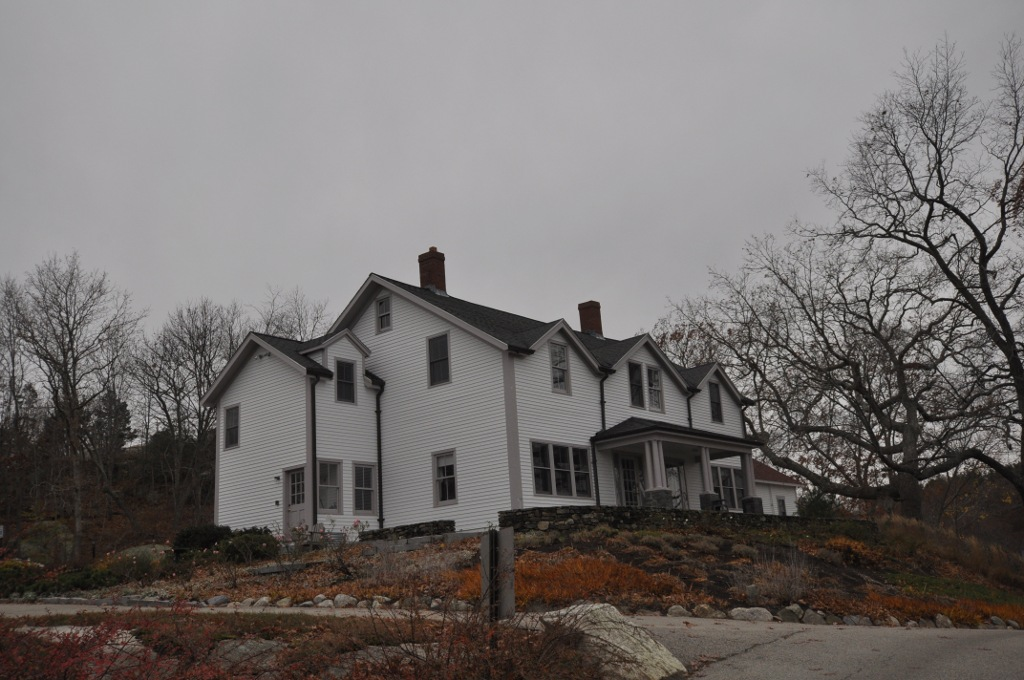
The off-duty lightkeeper's house was located in Cohasset.

All the apparatus was swept from the rock by two different storms in the summer of 1847. Workmen were swept into the sea several times, but none was drowned. Work had to be stopped for the winter in October 1847 and begun again in the spring of 1848, but by September of that year the nine holes had been drilled and the nine iron piles placed. The outer piles angled toward the center to a 14-foot (4.3 m) circumference, 38 feet (12 m) above the uneven surface of the ledge. These were braced horizontally by iron rods at 19-foot (5.8 m) intervals. Braces planned to strengthen the lower part of the tower were omitted on the theory that they would lessen rather than increase the over-all security of the edifice. However, it was where these braces were planned to go, that the structure actually broke off later.

A cast-iron spider, or capping, weighing 5 tons was secured to the top of this piling. The keeper's quarters were erected on top of this. Finally a 16-sided lantern room at the very top, housed a Fresnel lantern, with 15 reflectors. The light, a fixed beacon with an arc of 210°, was first lighted January 1, 1850.

The first keeper, Isaac Dunham, was confident the light structure was not safe and wrote Washington requesting that it be strengthened. When no action resulted he resigned on October 7, 1850. Capt. John W. Bennett, who succeeded him openly scoffed at his predecessor's fears. He hired new assistants including an Englishman named Joseph Wilson and a Portuguese named Joseph Antoine. Two keepers remained at the light at all times.

The braces of the structure were soon showing signs of strain, however, and were constantly having to be removed, taken to the mainland and strengthened and straightened. A terrific northeast storm a few weeks after he took charge, changed Bennett's mind and he officially reported the tower as in danger. A committee, delegated to investigate, arrived during a perfectly calm sea and returned to Boston, deciding nothing should be done.

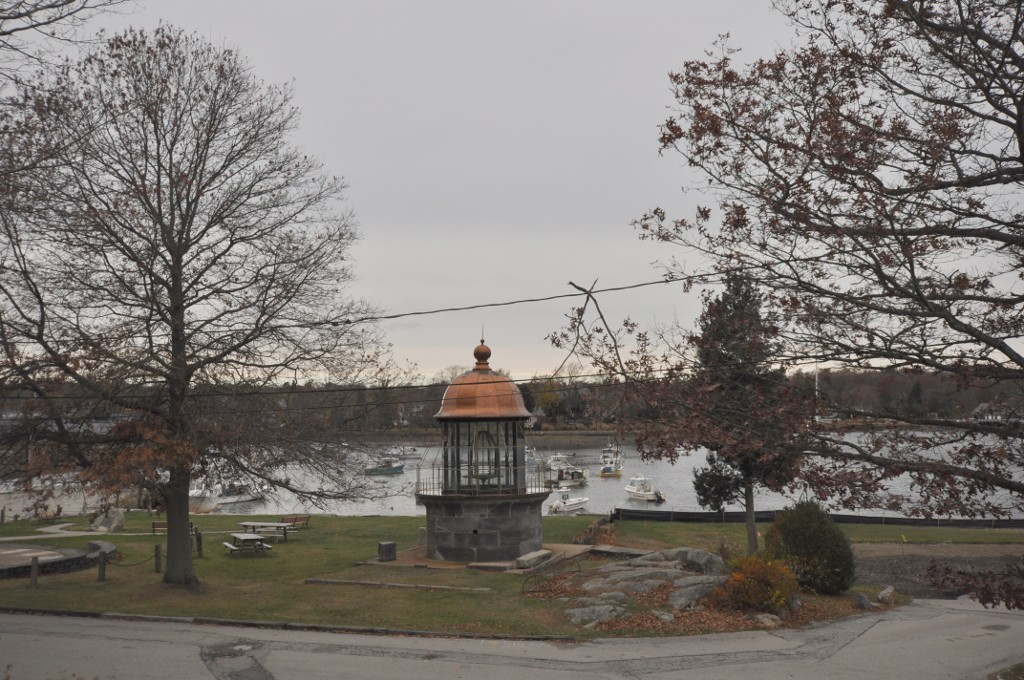
The "templates" on which the tower was first assembled on the mainland are just visible in the far left of this photo.

On March 16, 1851, during another terrible storm, the keepers deciding the lantern room was unsafe, retreated down into the store room, where they cowered for four days and nights, only occasionally climbing to the lantern to repair some damage done by the storm. The violent pitching and swaying of the tower almost knocked them off the rungs of the ladder, when they did. A relatively calm spell followed during which the braces were tightened.

Then easterly winds began blowing around April 8, 1851. Bennett departed for the mainland three days later, and this was the last time he saw his two assistants alive. When he sought to return next day, too heavy a sea was running at Minots Ledge to permit the attempt. The storm increased in fury and, by the 16th, was causing considerable damage ashore. At Minots Ledge, the two assistant keepers kept the bell ringing and the lamps burning, but just before midnight on the 16th they cast a bottle adrift containing a message for the outside world in case they failed to survive. The high tide at midnight sent wave after wave through the upper framework of the weakened structure. What actually happened then will never be known. Probably about 11 p.m. the central support snapped off completely, leaving the top-heavy 30-ton lantern tower held only by the outside piling. Then just before 1 a.m. on April 17, 1851, the great Minots Ledge Lighthouse finally slid over toward the sea. One by one the eight iron pilings broke until only three remained. The keepers, probably realizing that the end was near, began pounding furiously on the lighthouse bell. This was heard by residents of the Glades. With the tower bent over, the remaining supports now gave way and the great tower plunged into the ocean.

The body of Joseph Antoine was washed ashore later at Nantasket. Joseph Wilson managed to reach Gull Rock, probably mistaking it for the mainland. Here he apparently died of exhaustion and exposure.

Between 1851 and 1860 Minots Ledge was guarded by a lightship. Plans for a new stone edifice were meanwhile drawn up for the Lighthouse Board by Brigadier General Joseph G. Totten; model makers built the proposed new structure in miniature; the same location was decided upon; and Barton S. Alexander, of the United States Engineers, started work on its construction in April 1855.

The ledge had to be cut down to receive the foundation stones and space was not available for a regular cofferdam. In June the old stumps of the first tower were removed. Meanwhile cutting and assembling of the granite was done on Government Island in Cohasset, where the lightkeeper's house is. Seven granite blocks were to form the foundation. Permanent iron shafts, 20 feet (6.1 m) high, were set in eight of the holes in which the old lighthouse piling had been, while the ninth or central hole was left open, to form a cavity for the base circle. Later a well for drinking water was built up from this cavity through the middle of the new tower.

The framework structure disappeared during a severe storm on January 19, 1857, when the barque New Empire, which later went ashore at White Head, struck the temporary tower and demolished the iron scaffolding. So in the spring of 1857 the work had to be started all over again.

The first stone was finally laid July 9, 1857. Temporary cofferdams were constructed from sand bags, so that the foundation blocks, laid more than 2 feet (0.61 m) under the surface of the lowest tide, could be cemented to the rock face of the ledge. Strap iron between the courses kept the 2-ton stones apart while the cement was hardening.

The total appropriation of $330,000 was all spent, except a small surplus, in the construction. By the end of 1859, the thirty-second course, 62 feet (19 m) above low water had been reached, and 377 actual crew working hours had been consumed. The final stone was laid June 29, 1860, the whole granite structure having thus taken five years to complete, lacking one day. The new lighthouse was finished by mid-August 1860 and the light first exhibited August 22, 1860. The light was not regularly shone, however, until November 15, 1860, when Joshua Wheeler, the new keeper, and two assistants entered upon their duties.

The new stone tower has withstood every subsequent gale. The strongest waves cause nothing but a strong vibration. On some occasions the seas have actually swept over the top of the 97-foot (30 m) structure with no more damage than that caused by a few leaky windows or a cracked lamp or two.

On May 1, 1894, a new flashing lantern was installed, with the characteristic of a one-four-three flash, which lovers on shore soon found contained the same numerical count as the words "I love you." Minots Ledge has thus become known up and down the coast as the "Lover's Light."

The light was made automatic in 1947. Today its 45,000 candela light, 85 feet (26 m) above water, can be seen for 15 miles (24 km).

Minot's Ledge Lighthouse keepers in 1940: George H. Fitzpatrick, Perc A. Evans, Patrick J. Bridy

Minot's Ledge Lighthouse was designated as a National Historic Civil Engineering Landmark by the American Society of Civil Engineers in 1977. The light was added to the National Register of Historic Places in 1987 as Minot's Ledge Light.

It was put up for sale under the National Historic Lighthouse Preservation Act in 2009.

== Nomenclature and location ==
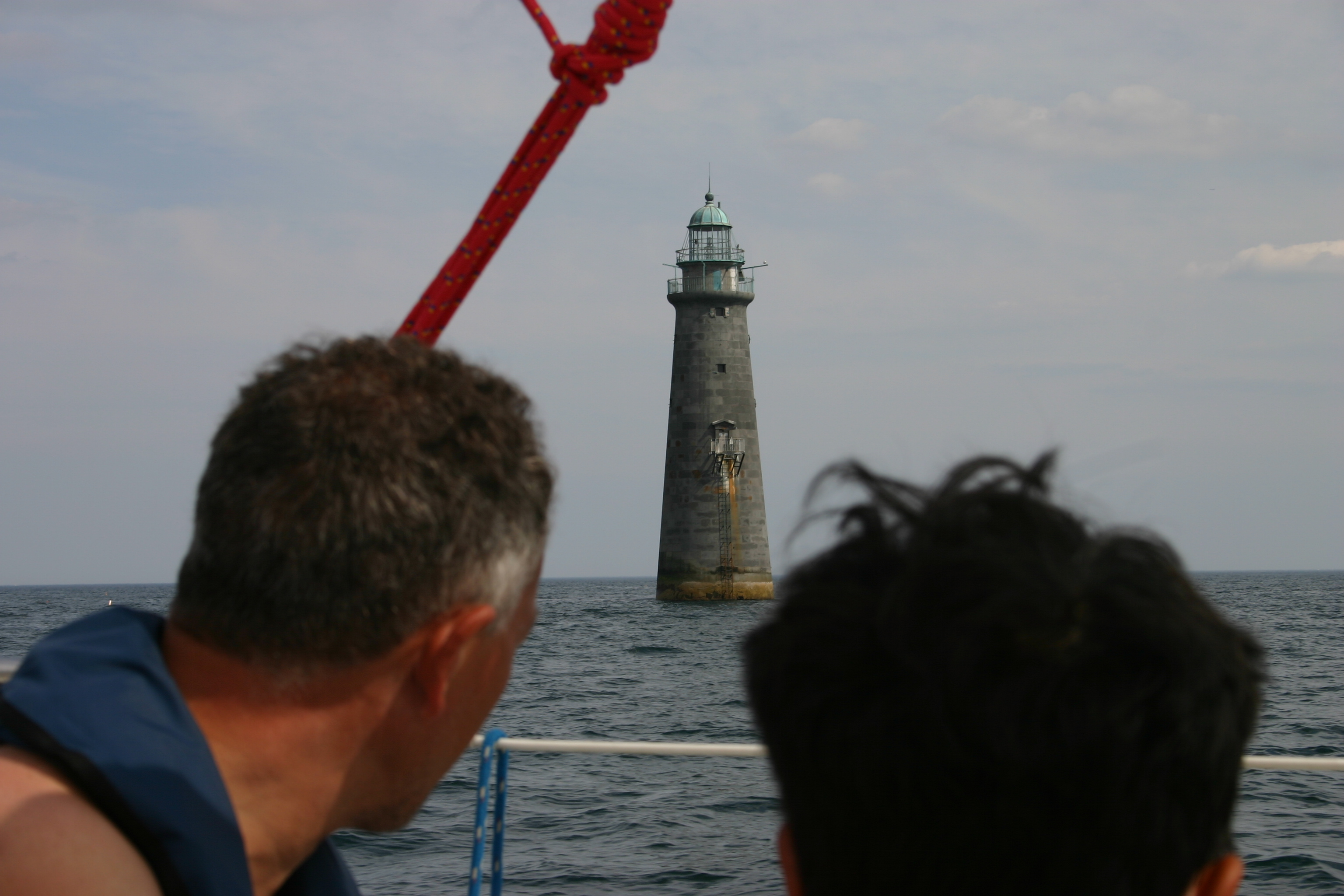
Minots Ledge Light as seen from a passing sailing vessel

Officially, it is Minots Ledge Light, but the National Register listing calls it Minot's Ledge Light. It is commonly referred to by locals as simply Minot Light.

There is a replica of the top section of the lighthouse, located on the shores of Cohasset Harbor. The replica can be viewed just outside the Cohasset Sailing Club. The replica on shore is not a replica, but instead is made from the stone and steel remnants of the original upper portion of the lighthouse including the lamp chamber, which was wholly rebuilt in the late twentieth century, the copper dome is in fact a replica.. It is located about one mile off of the coast of Scituate Neck.

== In popular culture ==
An image of Minot's Ledge Light has featured prominently on the label of Cohasset Punch, a brand of liqueur popular in Chicago, from 1899 until its discontinuation in the late-1980s. The brand was revived in 2024 and features a new illustration of Minot's Ledge Light.

== See also ==
- Government Island Historic District, the Cohasset land station associated with the lighthouse
- National Register of Historic Places in Plymouth County, Massachusetts
