= List of Alpha Delta Phi members =

Alpha Delta Phi is a social fraternity located in colleges and university in North America. It has both collegiate and honorary members. Following are some of its notable members.

== Art and architecture ==
Name	Chapter	Notable	Ref.
George Fisk Comfort	Middletown	Art historian, founder of the Metropolitan Museum of Art and Everson Museum of Art	
Louis Agassiz Fuertes	Cornell	Ornithological artist	
Alfred Dwight Foster Hamlin	Amherst	Architect, author, instructor at Columbia School of Engineering	
Daniel Huntington	Hamilton	Hudson River School artist	
Stephen Irwin	Toronto	Architect	
Russell Sturgis	Manhattan	Architect, art critic	
William Robert Ware	Harvard	Architect, professor of architecture at MIT, founder of the School of Architecture at Columbia University	

== Athletics ==
Name	Chapter	Notability	Ref.
Bernie Bierman	Minnesota	University of Minnesota football coach	
Andy Enfield	Johns Hopkins	Head basketball coach at University of Southern California	
Robert Garrett	Princeton	Olympic medalist	
Jeremy Glick	Rochester	U.S. National Collegiate Judo champion, 9/11 passenger	
Otto Graham	Northwestern	Pro Football Hall of Fame, professional football quarterback	
Terry Gurnett	Rochester	Head coach of women's soccer, set a record by winning 400 Division III games	
Miller Pontius	Peninsular	All-American assistant football coach and player, University of Tennessee and University of Michigan	
Dick Rifenburg	Peninsular	All-American End, University of Michigan, Detroit Lions, sports radio host	
Bill Smith	Hamilton	General manager of the Minnesota Twins	
Neil Snow	Peninsular	All-American football end and fullback	
Frank Steketee	Peninsular	All-American football fullback and halfback	
Joseph Wear	Yale	Olympic tennis medalist	

== Business and finance ==
Name	Chapter	Notability	Ref.
Charles Francis Adams Jr.	Harvard	President of Union Pacific Railroad, historian, author	
Colin Angle	Lambda Phi	Founder, chairman, and CEO of iRobot Corporation	
Bruce Fairchild Barton	Amherst	Ad executive, creator of Betty Crocker, U.S. House of Representatives	
Bill Downe	Toronto	CEO of the Bank of Montreal	
Eran Egozy	Lambda Phi	Founder and CTO of Harmonix Music Systems	
Clarence L. Fisher	Hamilton	Real estate, lumber and timber businessman, New York State Assembly	
Henry Clay Folger	Amherst	President of Standard Oil, founder of the Folger Shakespeare Library	
Charles Carroll Glover Jr.	Yale	Investment banker, philanthropist	
William Russell Grace	Columbia	Founder of W. R. Grace and Company	
Malcolm Knight	Toronto	Senior Deputy Governor of the Bank of Canada, general manager of the International Bank of Settlements	
Abbot Augustus Low	Yale	Inventor, owner of Horseshoe Forestry Company, Old Forge Electric Company and Utica Gas & Electric Company	
David Packard	Stanford	Electrical engineer, co-founder of the Hewlett-Packard Computer Corporation	
John A. Pollock	Toronto	Former owner of CTV Television Network, president of Electrohome, chancellor of Wilfrid Laurier	
Edgar Monsanto Queeny	Cornell	Chairman of Monsanto	
John D. Rockefeller Jr.	Brunonian	Director of Standard Oil and US Steel, philanthropist	
David M. Solomon	Hamilton	CEO of Goldman Sachs	
Allan Sproul	California	Director of Kaiser Aluminum	
Walter C. Teagle	Cornell	President of Standard Oil	
Gerald B. Zornow	Rochester	Chairman of Eastman Kodak	

== Clergy ==
Name	Chapter	Notability	Ref.
Henry Ward Beecher	Amherst	Congregationalist clergyman, social reformer, speaker, abolitionist	
William Henry Goodrich	Yale	Clergyman, namesake of the Goodrich Social Settlement	
Charles Edward Grinnell	Harvard	Clergyman, lawyer, writer	
Theodore B. Lyman	Hamilton	Bishop of the Episcopal Diocese of North Carolina	
Herbert Shipman	Madison	Suffragan Bishop of the Episcopal Diocese of New York	

== Diplomacy ==
Name	Chapter	Notable	Ref.
Larz Anderson	Harvard	U.S. Ambassador to Japan	
Richard R. Burt	Cornell	U.S. Ambassador to Germany	
Joseph Hodges Choate	Harvard	U.S. Ambassador to the United Kingdom	
Bainbridge Colby	Williams	U.S. Secretary of State, New York State Assembly, founder of Progressive Party	
Gordon Gale Crean	Toronto	Canadian Ambassador to Italy, Yugoslavia, and West Germany	
William R. Day	Peninsular	U.S. Secretary of State	
Irving B. Dudley	Capital	U.S. Ambassador to Brazil	
James George	Toronto	High Commissioner of Canada to Ceylon and India, Ambassador to Iran and Nepal, activist	
Colin W. G. Gibson	Toronto	Canadian Secretary of State	
Joseph Grew	Harvard	U.S. Ambassador to Japan, U.S. Ambassador to Denmark, Under Secretary of State	
Alger Hiss	Johns Hopkins	U.S. State Department, United Nations official	
Edward M. House	Cornell	Politician, U.S. commissioner to the Paris Peace Conference of 1919	
John Jay	Columbia	U.S. Minister to Austria-Hungary, lawyer, abolitionist	
William Luers	Hamilton	U.S. Ambassador to Czechoslovakia and Venezuela	
Horace Maynard	Amherst	U.S. Ambassador to Turkey, Tennessee Attorney General, U.S. House of Representatives	
Michael Oren	Columbia	Israeli Ambassador to the United States	
William E. Quimby	Peninsular	U.S. Ambassador to the Netherlands	
J. Meredith Read	Brunonian	U.S. Minister to Greece, U.S. consul general for France and Algeria	
Somerville Pinkney Tuck	Dartmouth	U.S. Ambassador to Egypt	
Edwin F. Uhl	Peninsular	U.S. Ambassador to Germany, U.S. Assistant Secretary of State	
George Wadsworth II	Union	U.S. Ambassador to Turkey, Saudi Arabia, and Czechoslovakia	
Adrian Zuckerman	Lambda Phi	U.S. Ambassador to Romania	

== Education ==
Name	Chapter	Notability	Ref.
Joseph Sweetman Ames	Johns Hopkins	President of Johns Hopkins University	
J. Seelye Bixler	Amherst	President of Colby College	
Francis Brown	Dartmouth	Theologian, Semitic scholar, college professor	
G. Armour Craig	Amherst	President of Amherst College	
Charles William Eliot	Harvard	President of Harvard University	
John Robert Evans	Toronto	President of University of Toronto, founder of McMaster University Medical School	
William Watts Folwell	Geneva	President of the University of Minnesota	
Claude Fuess	Amherst	Headmaster of Phillips Academy	
Horace Howard Furness	Harvard	Shakespearian scholar, University of Pennsylvania lecturer	
Richard Glenn Gettell	Amherst	President of Mount Holyoke College	
Daniel Coit Gilman	Yale	President of Johns Hopkins University	
Abram W. Harris	Middletown	President of Northwestern University and University of Maine	
Emory William Hunt	Rochester	President of Denison University and Bucknell University	
Harry Burns Hutchins	Peninsular	President of University of Michigan, dean of University of Michigan School of Law	
Robert Maynard Hutchins	Yale	President of the University of Chicago	
George Frederick Magoun	Bowdoin	President of Iowa College	
Francis March	Amherst	Academic, philologist, lexicographer, principal founder of modern comparative linguistics	
Barry Mills	Bowdoin	President of Bowdoin College	
Lewis Perry	Williams	Educator, Principal of Phillips Exeter Academy	
Andrew Van Vranken Raymond	Union	President of Union College	
Benjamin Rush Rhees	Amherst	President, University of Rochester	
Henry Wade Rogers	Peninsular	President, Northwestern University; dean, Yale Law School	
Eugene V. Rostow	Yale	Dean of Yale Law School, adviser to the U.S. Department of State	
Michael S. Roth	Middletown	President of Wesleyan University	
Peter H. Russell	Toronto	Professor of political science, University of Toronto, Principal of Innis College	
Frederick Herbert Sill	Columbia	Founder of Kent School, Episcopalian priest	
Robert E. L. Strider	Amherst	President of Colby College	
F. W. Taussig	Harvard	Economist, professor at Harvard, Chair of the U.S. Tariff Commission	
Edwin Willits	Peninsular	President of the State Agricultural College (now Michigan State University)	

== Entertainment ==
Name	Chapter	Notability	Ref.
Fredric March	Wisconsin	Actor	
Chris Miller	Dartmouth	Screenwriter, National Lampoon's Animal House	
Ben Stein	Columbia	Actor, author	
Grant Tinker	Dartmouth	President of NBC	
Franchot Tone	Cornell	Actor	
Monty Woolley	Yale	Actor	

== Law ==
Name	Chapter	Notability	Ref.
Samuel Blatchford	Columbia	Associate Justice of the U.S. Supreme Court	
Henry Billings Brown	Yale	Associate Justice of the U.S. Supreme Court	
Charles S. Bradley	Brunonian	Chief Justice of the Rhode Island Supreme Court	
Salmon P. Chase	Dartmouth	Chief Justice of the U.S. Supreme Court, Secretary of the Treasury	
John David Clifford Jr.	Bowdoin	District Judge of the U.S. District Court for the District of Maine	
Frederic R. Colie	Urban	Associate Justice of the New Jersey Supreme Court	
Alfred Conkling Coxe Jr.	Yale	District Judge of the U.S. District Court for the Southern District of New York	
William R. Day	Peninsular	Associate Justice of the U.S. Supreme Court	
Edward C. Eicher	Chicago	Chief Justice of the District Court of the U.S. for the District of Columbia, U.S. House of Representatives	
William H. J. Ely	Peninsular	District Judge in New Jersey, New Jersey Senate, attorney	
Horace Weldon Gilmore	Peninsular	District Judge of the U.S. District Court for the Eastern District of Michigan	
Harry B. Hershey	Illinois	Justice of the Illinois Supreme Court	
Oliver Wendell Holmes Jr.	Harvard	Associate Justice of the U.S. Supreme Court	
Schuyler W. Jackson	Harvard	Associate Justice of the Kansas Supreme Court	
George V. N. Lothrop	Brunonian	Michigan Attorney General	
James Francis Thaddeus O'Connor	Yale	District Judge of the U.S. District Court for the Southern District of California	
George Shiras Jr.	Yale	Associate Justice of the U.S. Supreme Court	
Henderson M. Somerville	Alabama	President of the Board of General Appraisers, Associate Justice of the Alabama Supreme Court	
James Garfield Stewart	Kenyon	Associate Justice of the U.S. Supreme Court.	
Harlan F. Stone	Amherst	Chief Justice of the U.S. Supreme Court	
Bartow S. Weeks	Manhattan	Justice of the New York Supreme Court	

== Literature and journalism ==
Name	Chapter	Notability	Ref.
Samuel Hopkins Adams	Hamilton	Investigative journalist, author	
John Perry Barlow	Middletown	Poet, essayist, lyricist for the Grateful Dead, co-founder of the Electronic Frontier Foundation	
Philip Barry	Yale	Playwright, author	
Arlo Bates	Bowdoin	Novelist, poet	
Francis Bellamy	Rochester	Author of the original Pledge of Allegiance	
Stephen Vincent Benét	Yale	Poet	
George William Curtis	Brunonian	Writer, journalist, political editor of Harpers Weekly	
Michael de Pencie	Toronto	Publisher, chairman of Key Publishers Company Limited	
Richard Eberhart	Minnesota	Poet	
John C. Farrar	Yale	Poet, publisher	
Edward Everett Hale	Harvard	Author, historian, minister	
Owen Johnson	Yale	Author	
Elijah Kellogg	Bowdoin	Minister, author of popular adventure books for children	
Pagan Kennedy	Middletown	Author, pioneer of the 1990s zine movement	
James Russell Lowell	Harvard	Poet, critic, editor, and diplomat	
Henry Luce	Yale	Publisher; founder of Time–Life	
Robert Ludlum	Middletown	Novelist	
Hamilton Wright Mabie	Williams	Essayist	
Manton Marble	Rochester	Journalist, editor and owner of the New York World	
Jack McClelland	Toronto	Publisher, president of McClelland and Stewart, Officer of the Order of Canada	
Robert R. McCormick	Yale	Editor and publisher of the Chicago Tribune	
Donald Grant Mitchell	Yale	Essayist and novelist	
P. J. O'Rourke	Miami	Author, political satirist and journalist	
Francis Parkman	Harvard	Author, historian	
Daniel Pearl	Stanford	Journalist, editor of The Wall Street Journal	
Anthony Robinson	Columbia	Novelist and professor at SUNY New Paltz	
John Codman Ropes	Harvard	Author, military historian	
Alfred Billings Street	Hamilton	Author, poet	
George Templeton Strong	Columbia	Diarist	
Scott Turow	Amherst	Novelist	
Moses Coit Tyler	Yale	Author, historian, academic	
William Hayes Ward	Amherst	Journalist, editor in chief of The Independent (New York City)	
Thornton Wilder	Yale	Author, playwright	
Talcott Williams	Amherst	Journalist, educator	
Owen Wister	Harvard	Writer, "father of Western fiction"	

== Military ==
Name	Chapter	Notable	Ref.
Charles Francis Adam	Harvard	U.S. Secretary of the Navy	
Thomas Ewing Jr.	Brunonian	Major General, U.S. Army, Chief Justice of the Kansas Supreme Court, U.S. House of Representatives	
Jacob H. Sharp	Alabama	Brigadier General, Army of Tennessee, Confederate States Army	
Henry E. Tremain	Manhattan	Civil War Medal of Honor recipient, author, lawyer	
Joshua L. Chamberlain	Bowdoin	Governor of Maine, Union Army Brigadier General, Medal of Honor Recipient, 6th President of Bowdoin College	

== Politics ==
Name	Chapter	Notable	Ref.
William B. Allison	Hudson	U.S. Senate, U.S. House of Representatives	
Herbert Ames	Amherst	Financial Director of the League of Nations, Canadian Parliament	
Robert R. Barry	Hamilton	U.S. House of Representatives	
Carroll L. Beedy	Yale	U.S. House of Representatives	
Taul Bradford	Alabama	U.S. House of Representatives	
Joshua Chamberlain	Bowdoin	Governor of Maine, President of Bowdoin College	
Alfred C. Chapin	Williams	U.S. House of Representatives, Mayor of Brooklyn	
Ray P. Chase	Minnesota	U.S. House of Representatives, Minnesota State Auditor	
Patrick W. Cullinan	Cornell	New York State Assembly	
Dwight F. Davis	Harvard	Secretary of War, Governor-General of the Philippines	
William Dennison Jr.	Miami	Governor of Ohio, U.S. Postmaster General	
John S. Dyson	Cornell	Deputy Mayor of New York City, Commissioner of Commerce	
Charles S. Fairchild	Harvard	U.S. Secretary of the Treasury, Attorney General of New York	
James Rudolph Garfield	Williams	U.S. Secretary of the Interior	
George Reginald Geary	Toronto	Minister of Justice, Mayor of Toronto, Canadian Parliament	
Frederick H. Gillett	Amherst	Speaker of the U.S. House of Representatives	
William S. Groesbeck	Miami	U.S. House of Representatives	
Clarence E. Hancock	Middletown	U.S. House of Representatives	
John Philip Hill	Johns Hopkins	U.S. House of Representatives	
Phineas Hitchcock	Williams	U.S. Senate	
Richard D. Hubbard	Yale	Governor of Connecticut, U.S. House of Representatives	
Thomas Jenckes	Brunonian	U.S. House of Representatives	
Otto Kerner Jr.	Brunonian	Governor of Illinois, Circuit Judge of the U.S. Court of Appeals	
Goodwin Knight	Stanford	Governor of California	
Bill Luther	Minnesota	U.S. House of Representatives	
Medill McCormick	Yale	U.S. Senate, U.S. House of Representatives	
Hunter Meighan	Columbia	New York State Assembly, New York State Senate	
William Henry Moore	Toronto	Canadian Parliament	
Marcus Morton	Brunonian	Chief Justice of the Massachusetts Supreme Judicial Court	
Edward Follansbee Noyes	Dartmouth	Governor of Ohio, U.S. Ambassador to France	
J. Van Vechten Olcott	Manhattan	U.S. House of Representatives	
Leonard Outerbridge	Toronto	Lieutenant Governor of Newfoundland, Companion of the Order of Canada	
Charles H. Percy	Chicago	U.S. Senate, President of the Bell & Howell Corporation	
George E. Pugh	Miami	U.S. Senate	
Joseph V. Quarles	Peninsular	U.S. Senate, U.S. District Judge of the Eastern District of Wisconsin	
James Burton Reynolds	Dartmouth	Assistant Secretary of the Treasury	
Ellis H. Roberts	Yale	U.S. House of Representatives, Treasurer of the U.S.	
Franklin D. Roosevelt	Harvard	President of the United States	
Theodore Roosevelt	Harvard	President of the United States	
George Washington Shonk	Middletown	U.S. House of Representatives	
Herbert B. Shonk	Middletown	New York State Assembly	
Watson G. Squire	Middletown	U.S. Senate, Ohio Attorney General	
Thomas Sweeney	Yale	West Virginia Senate	
Allen T. Treadway	Amherst	U.S. House of Representatives	
Fred Upton	Peninsular	U.S. House of Representatives	
Aldonijah Welch	Peninsular	U.S. Senate, President of Iowa State Agricultural College (now Iowa State University)	
Ashbel P. Willard	Hamilton	Governor of Indiana	
John S. Wold	Union	U.S. House of Representatives	

== Science and engineering ==
Name	Chapter	Notability	Ref.
Frederick Madison Allen	California	Pioneer in diabetes	
Farrington Daniels	Minnesota	Pioneer in solar energy; chairman of chemistry at University of Wisconsin–Madison	
Michael Gazzaniga	Dartmouth	Cognitive neuroscientist	
Theodore Luqueer Mead	Cornell	Naturalist, entomologist, horticulturist	
James Fraser Mustard	Toronto	Scientist, co-founder, and dean of McMaster Faculty of Medicine	
Kenneth Ouriel	Rochester	Vascular surgeon, chief of surgery at the Cleveland Clinic	
Augustus Post	Amherst	Aviation and automotive pioneer, founder of the American Automobile Association	
Charles Wardell Stiles	Middletown	Zoologist, parasitologist with the U.S. Department of Agriculture	
Daniel M. Tani	Lambda Phi	NASA astronaut	
Josiah Whitney	Yale	Chief of the California Geological Survey, namesake of Mount Whitney	
Walter Wyman	Amherst	Physician, Surgeon General of the U.S.	
