= List of Fly Club members =

Members of Harvard University student group

The Fly Club is a final club for male students at Harvard University. It was formed as a literary society in 1836 and operated as a chapter of the Alpha Delta Phi fraternity from 1837 to 1865 and from 1878 to 1906. It adopted its nickname, the Fly Club, as its official name in 1910. The Fly Club merged with the final club, D.U. (Delta Upsilon), in 1996, including absorbing the alumni of D.U.

The following is a list of notable members of the Fly Club.

== Academia ==
- James Barr Ames (1868) – dean of Harvard Law School (1895–1910), known for popularizing the case-study method of teaching law
- Thomas Chase (1848) – Noted Latin scholar, President of Haverford College
- Francis James Child (1846) – first Professor of English at Harvard University, best known today for his collection of English and Scottish ballads now known as the Child Ballads
- James B. Conant (1914) – President of Harvard University and United States Ambassador to West Germany
- Archibald Cary Coolidge (1887) – historian, Harvard professor, first director of the Harvard University Library
- Charles William Eliot (1853) – President of Harvard University
- Samuel Eliot (1839) – president of Trinity College and Boston Public Schools superintendent
- Horace Howard Furness (1854) – Shakespearian scholar, lecturer University of Pennsylvania
- James Gilligan (1957) - American psychiatrist and academic, former director of the Harvard Institute of Law and Psychiatry
- Horatio Hale (1836) – ethnologist and philologist
- Rufus King (1836) – president of the University of Cincinnati and dean of the Cincinnati Law School
- George Martin Lane (1846) – scholar, influential professor of Latin at Harvard University
- A. Lawrence Lowell – historian and President of Harvard University
- James Edward Oliver (1849) – mathematician known for his role in establishing the mathematics department at Cornell University
- Jonathan Westphal (1973) – philosopher and author of "The Mind-Body Problem", MIT, 2016.
- Charles Stearns Wheeler (1836) – transcendentalist, noted as inspiration for Henry David Thoreau’s Walden

== Architecture ==
- Thomas Curtis Clarke (1848) – American railway engineer, builder and author best known for a series of cast iron bridges in the United States; his firm won the contract to build the east and west blocks of the Canadian Houses of Parliament
- Herbert Dudley Hale (1888) – Boston and New York City architect who designed the Fly Club's house at Two Holyoke Place
- William Robert Ware (1852) – architect, first professor of architecture at MIT, founder of the School of Architecture at Columbia University

== Business ==
- Charles Francis Adams Jr. (1888) – president of the Union Pacific Railroad, colonel in the Union Army during the American Civil War
- Charlie Cheever – co-founder of Quora
- George H. Mifflin (1865) – president of Houghton Mifflin publishing company
- Louis Kane – chairman of Au Bon Pain bakery and café chain
- Clarence B. Randall (Delta Upsilon) – businessman, lawyer, and chairman of the Board of Inland Steel Company
- David Rockefeller – banker

== Entertainment ==
- Robert Benchley (Delta Upsilon) – humorist, actor, and winner of the 1935 Academy Award for Best Short Film (How to Sleep)
- Robert Carlock – screenwriter and producer
- Fred Gwynne – stage, film, and television actor
- Joseph Losey (Delta Upsilon) – film and theatre director, producer, and screenwriter
- Bruce Pecheur (1964) – model and actor
- Whit Stillman – writer-director and actor known for Metropolitan, which was nominated for the Academy Award for Best Original Screenplay

== Law ==
- James C. Carter (1850) – co-founder of law firm Carter Ledyard & Milburn
- William Gardner Choate (1852) – judge of the United States District Court for the Southern District of New York and founder of boarding school Choate Rosemary Hall
- Oliver Wendell Holmes Jr. (1861) – Supreme Court Justice
- John Lowell (1843) – judge of the United States Circuit Court for the First Circuit
- Stephen Henry Phillips (1842) – Massachusetts Attorney General and Attorney General of Hawaii
- John Codman Ropes (1857) – co-founder of law firm Ropes & Grey

== Literature and journalism ==
- Selamawi Asgedom (1999) – author and public speaker
- Octavius Frothingham (1843) – clergyman, author, art critic, and abolitionist
- Francis Parkman (1844) – author and historian
- Ernest Thayer – poet, author of "Casey at the Bat"
- Evan Thomas – journalist and author
- Owen Wister (1882) – writer, "father" of western fiction

== Military ==
- Alexander Bliss (1847) – assistant quartermaster general of the Union forces and a colonel in the United States Army during the American Civil War
- Henry L. Eustis (1838) – General in the Union Army during Civil War; dean of Lawrence Scientific School
- Manning Ferguson Force (1845) – lawyer, judge, Union Army general, and recipient of the Medal of Honor
- Peter A. Porter (1845) – lawyer, politician, member of the Breckinridge family, and a Union Army colonel in the American Civil War

== Politics ==
- Charles Francis Adams III (1888) – Secretary of the Navy and skipper of America's Cup defender Resolute
- Larz Anderson (1888) – secretary at the United States Legation to the Court of St James's, secretary and later chargé d'affaires at the United States Embassy in Rome; U.S. Minister to Belgium; and U.S. Ambassador to Japan
- Edward Bell (1904) – U.S. diplomatic official involved in the decoding of the Zimmerman Telegram in World War I
- Lathrop Brown (1904) – United States House of Representatives
- Joseph Hodges Choate (1849) – U.S. Ambassador to the United Kingdom
- Dwight F. Davis (1900) – U.S. Secretary of War and Governor General of the Philippines; Olympic tennis player, and founder of the Davis Cup; International
- Thomas H. Eliot (Delta Upsilon) – United States House of Representatives
- Grenville T. Emmet (1898) – U.S. Ambassador to the Netherlands and U.S. Ambassador to Austria
- Charles S. Fairchild (1863) – United States Secretary of the Treasury and Attorney General of New York
- John B. Felton (1847) – Mayor of Oakland, California
- Joseph Grew (1902) – U.S. Ambassador to Japan, oversaw the development of U.S. Foreign Service
- Charles Hale (1850) – Speaker of the Massachusetts House of Representatives and United States Assistant Secretary of State
- Wickham Hoffman (1841) – U.S. Minister to Denmark and Colonel in the Union Army
- Joseph P. Kennedy Sr. – United States Ambassador to the United Kingdom, chair of the U.S. Maritime Commission, and 1st Chair of the U.S. Securities and Exchange Commission
- Jared Kushner – Senior White House Adviser and head of the Office of American Innovation
- Anthony Lake – National Security Advisor and Executive Director of UNICEF
- James Russell Lowell (1836) – U.S. Ambassador to Spain, U.S. Ambassador to the Court of St. James's, poet, and editor
- Deval Patrick – Governor of Massachusetts
- Roger Putnam – Mayor of Springfield, Massachusetts and director of the U.S. Economic Stabilization Administration
- Jay Rockefeller – United States Senate
- Franklin D. Roosevelt (1904) – President of the United States
- James Roosevelt (1907) – United States House of Representatives
- George R. Stobbs (Delta Upsilon) – United States House of Representatives
- Bill Weld – Governor of Massachusetts

== Religion ==
- Phillips Brooks (1855) – clergyman, author, lyricist
- Charles Edward Grinnell – clergyman, lawyer, and writer
- Edward Everett Hale (1839) – author, historian, Unitarian minister, chaplain to the U.S. Senate
- William Appleton Lawrence (1911) – Bishop of the Episcopal Diocese of Western Massachusetts
- Logan H. Roots (Delta Upsilon, 1891) – Episcopal Bishop of Hankow

== Science ==
- Francis Cabot – gardener, horticulturist, chairman of the New York Botanical Garden, and founder of the Garden Conservancy

== Sports ==
- Arthur Cumnock (1891) – one of the greatest college football players in Harvard's history, namesake of Cumnock Field
- Charles Dudley Daly (1900) – college football player and coach who was inducted into the College Football Hall of Fame
- Dwight F. Davis – Olympic tennis player, three-time U.S. Open doubles champion, founder of the Davis Cup, International Tennis Hall of Fame inductee, U.S. Secretary of War, and Governor General of the Philippines
- W. Palmer Dixon – two-time winner of U.S. squash championship
- Henry Thrun – professional ice hockey player for the San Jose Sharks, winner of a gold medal at the 2021 World Junior Championship
- Ian Moore — professional ice hockey player for the Anaheim Ducks

== See also ==
- List of Alpha Delta Phi members
- List of Delta Upsilon members
