= Alice P. Gannett =

American settlement house worker and social reformer

Alice Peirson Gannett
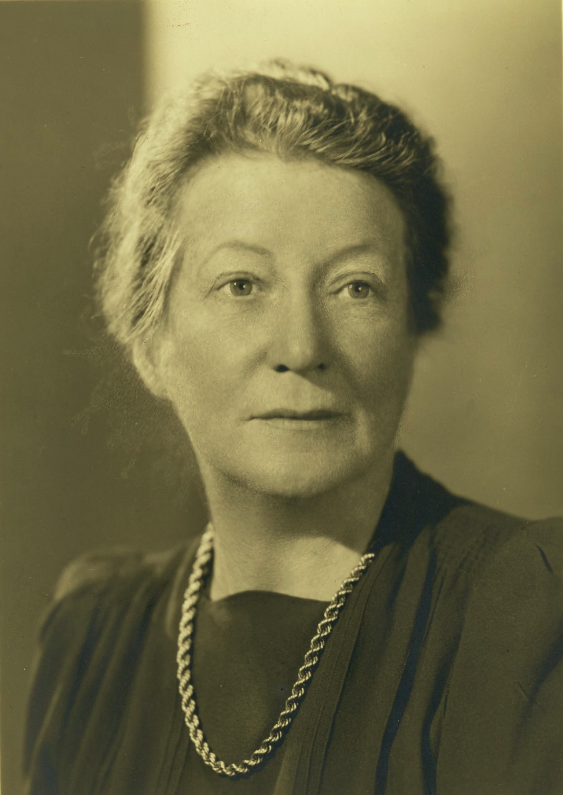
- Born: September 13, 1875
- Died: May 13, 1962 (aged 86)
- Education: Bryn Mawr College
- Occupations: settlement house worker; social reformer
- Known for: Goodrich-Gannett Neighborhood Center

Alice P. Gannett (September 13, 1875 – May 13, 1962) was an American settlement house worker and social reformer. The Goodrich-Gannett Neighborhood Center in Cleveland, Ohio, is named in her honor.

== Early life and education ==
Alice Peirson Gannett was born September 13, 1875. She was the daughter of Henry Gannett, chief geographer for the United States Geological Survey and a founding member and president of the National Geographic Society, and Mary (Chase) Gannett.

Her early education was at the Washington High School, Washington, D.C., and by private study. She received an A.B. degree, emphasis English and German, at Bryn Mawr College, 1898.

== Career ==
After graduation, Gannett taught English at Washington High School, 1898–1901, and worked as a teacher and tutor, New York City, 1901–05.

Gannett was the assistant headworker, at Welcome Hall, Buffalo, New York 1906–07, assistant to Mr. Howard. In 1907, she took up residence at Normal College Alumnae House, West 72d street, New York, as headworker. She served as headworker, Lenox Hill House, New York City, 1907–12; Associate headworker, Henry Street Settlement, New York City, 1912; and Head Worker, Goodrich Social Settlement, Cleveland, Ohio, 1917–47. She was also identified with summer work in St. George's parish and at Richmond Hill House. She was a member of the Speakers' Committee, College Settlements Association, 1904–05. In 1922, Gannett attended the International Settlements' Conference in London.

Gannett served as president of the, Ohio Consumers’ League, the National Federation of Settlements, and the Cleveland Settlement Union. She also served as secretary, Working Boys' Home, Washington, D.C. 1905–06, treasurer, Neighbourhood Workers' Association, New York City, 1908–15; and Special Agent, Children's Bureau, 1915–17.

As well as being an active member in the International League for Human Rights, Gannett was a member of the Women's Trade Union League, American Association for Labor Legislation, Intercollegiate Socialist Society, and the Bryn Mawr Club of New York City. She favored woman suffrage; she chaired the 18th Assembly District, 1908–09. Gannett was a Socialist.

== Death and legacy ==
Alice Peirson Gannett died May 13, 1962. The Goodrich-Gannett Neighborhood Center is named in her honor and that of Rev. Dr. William Henry Goodrich.

== Selected works ==
- The settlement summer camp : its ideals and organization by Alice P Gannett(, 1923

=== Articles ===
- "Settlement Goals for the Next Third of a Century", 1926 (Text)

=== Lyrics ===
- "Freshman Song 1898", 1898 (Score)
