= List of presidents of NBC Entertainment =

The following is a list of presidents of the entertainment division for the NBC television network.

Name	Years	Notes
Joseph H. McConnell	1949-1952	Joseph H. McConnell served as President of NBC from 1949 to 1952, a pivotal era for the network. He oversaw the rapid expansion of television broadcasting, guided the company through the transition from radio to TV.
Sylvester Weaver	1953–1955	Weaver created Today in 1952, followed by Tonight Starring Steve Allen (1954), Home (1954) with Arlene Francis and Wide Wide World (1955), hosted by Dave Garroway. He required NBC shows to include at least one sophisticated cultural reference or performance per installment — including a segment of a Verdi opera adapted to the comic style of Sid Caesar and Imogene Coca's groundbreaking Your Show of Shows.
Robert E. Kintner	1958–1966	His NBC tenure was marked by his aggressive effort to push NBC News past CBS News in rankings and prestige. The news department was given more money, leading to notable coverage of the 1960 Presidential election campaign, and the prominence of The Huntley-Brinkley Report.
Julian Goodman	1966–1974	Goodman helped establish Chet Huntley and David Brinkley as a well-known news team and led the network from 1966 to 1974. While working for NBC, he negotiated a $1 million deal to retain Johnny Carson as host of The Tonight Show.
Herbert Schlosser	1974–1978	In 1974, under new president Herb Schlosser, the network tried to attract younger viewers with a series of costly movies, miniseries and specials. This failed to attract the desirable 18–34 demographic, and simultaneously alienated older viewers. None of the new prime-time shows that NBC introduced in the fall of 1975 earned a second season renewal, all failing in the face of established competition. The network's lone breakout success that season was the groundbreaking late-night comedy/variety show, NBC's Saturday Night – which would be renamed Saturday Night Live in 1976, after the cancellation of a Howard Cosell-hosted program of the same title on ABC – which replaced reruns of The Tonight Show that previously aired in its Saturday time slot.
Fred Silverman	1978–1981	His three-year tenure at the network proved to be a difficult period, marked by several high-profile failures such as the sitcom Hello, Larry, the variety shows The Big Show and Pink Lady, the drama Supertrain, and the Jean Doumanian era of Saturday Night Live. (Silverman hired Doumanian after Al Franken, the planned successor for outgoing Lorne Michaels, castigated Silverman's failures on-air in a way that Silverman took very personally.) Despite these failures, there were high points in Silverman's tenure at NBC, including the launch of the critically lauded Hill Street Blues (1981), the epic mini-series Shōgun, and The David Letterman Show (daytime, 1980), which would lead to Letterman's successful late night program in 1982. Silverman had Letterman in a holding deal after the morning show which kept the unemployed Letterman from going to another network. However, Silverman nearly lost his then-current late night host, market leader Johnny Carson, after Carson sued NBC in a contract dispute; the case was settled out of court and Carson remained with NBC in exchange for the rights to his show and a reduction in time on air. Silverman also developed successful comedies such as Diff'rent Strokes, The Facts of Life and Gimme a Break!, and made the series commitments that led to Cheers and St. Elsewhere. Silverman also pioneered entertainment reality programming with the 1979 launch of Real People. His contributions to the network's game show output included Goodson-Todman's Card Sharks and a revival of Password, both of which enjoyed great success in the morning schedule, although he also canceled several other relatively popular series, including The Hollywood Squares and High Rollers, to make way for The David Letterman Show (those cancellations also threatened Wheel of Fortune, whose host, Chuck Woolery, departed the show in a payment dispute during Silverman's tenure, although the show survived). Silverman also oversaw the hiring of Pat Sajak as the new host of Wheel of Fortune, although he objected to Sajak's hiring. On Saturday mornings, in a time when most of the cartoon output of the three networks was similar, Silverman oversaw the development of an animated series based on The Smurfs; the animated series The Smurfs ran from 1981 to 1989, well after Silverman's departure, making it one of his longest-lasting contributions to the network. He also oversaw a revival of The Flintstones. In other areas of NBC, Silverman revitalized the news division, which resulted in Today and NBC Nightly News achieving parity with their competition for the first time in years.
Brandon Tartikoff	1981–1991	He was credited with turning around NBC's low prime time reputation with such hit series as Hill Street Blues, L.A. Law, Law & Order, ALF, Family Ties, The Cosby Show, Cheers, Seinfeld, The Golden Girls, Wings, Miami Vice, Knight Rider, The A-Team, Saved by the Bell, The Fresh Prince of Bel-Air, St. Elsewhere, and Night Court. Tartikoff also helped develop the 1984 sitcom Punky Brewster; he named the title character after a girl he had a crush on in school.
Warren Littlefield	1991-1998	During his time as president of NBC, Littlefield oversaw the creation of many shows for the network throughout the 1990s such as Seinfeld, The Fresh Prince of Bel-Air, Wings, Blossom, Law & Order, Mad About You, Sisters, Frasier, Friends, ER, Homicide: Life on the Street, Caroline in the City, NewsRadio, 3rd Rock from the Sun, Suddenly Susan, Just Shoot Me!, Will & Grace and The West Wing.
Scott Sassa	1998-1999	During this time, he oversaw the development and production of NBC's new primetime series, including such shows as The West Wing, Law & Order: Special Victims Unit and Fear Factor. Under Sassa, NBC was the number-one network 3 out of 4 seasons.
Garth Ancier	1999–2000	Beginning in May 1999, Ancier served as President of NBC Entertainment, where he helped put The West Wing and Law & Order: SVU on the air, while conversely being the one who cancelled the 1999 teen drama-comedy series Freaks and Geeks (a move he has since expressed regret over). Ancier was forced out from NBC in November 1999.
Jeff Zucker	2000–2004	He kept the network ahead of the pack by airing the gross out show Fear Factor, negotiating for the cast of the hit series Friends to take the series up to a tenth season, and signing Donald Trump for the reality show The Apprentice. He is credited with the idea to extend Friends episodes by 10 minutes, and convinced the cast to extend their contracts by two years. The Friends era was one of the most profitable ever for NBC. The Zucker era produced a spike in operating earnings for NBC, from $532 million the year he took over to $870 million in 2003." Zucker introduced Las Vegas, Law & Order: Criminal Intent, and Scrubs. He originated the idea of airing "Supersized" (longer than the standard 30 minute slot) episodes of NBC's comedies and aggressively programming in the summer months as cable networks began to draw away viewers with original programming from the network's rerun-filled summer slate.
Kevin Reilly	2004-2007	Despite NBC's poor performance, Reilly oversaw the development of some of the network's most enduring shows that helped to define the network. His vocal support of The Office helped it survive its low-rated first season. Reilly has been credited with developing shows such as My Name Is Earl, Heroes, 30 Rock, and Friday Night Lights.
Ben Silverman	2007–2009	He is credited for his role in saving the critically acclaimed but low-rated NBC drama Friday Night Lights by striking an innovative deal with DirecTV. The satellite television provider agreed to take on a substantial amount of the show's production budget in exchange for exclusive first-window airing rights on its 101 channel. NBC would then repurpose the episodes to be aired on the network later in the season.
Jeff Gaspin	2009–2010	Some of the businesses he is responsible for are NBC Entertainment (home to hits such as The Office, 30 Rock, and The Tonight Show), cable channels USA Network and Bravo, and NBC Universal Domestic Television Distribution which distributes such shows as The Martha Stewart Show and The Jerry Springer Show.
Robert Greenblatt	2011–2018	He succeeded Jeff Gaspin in January 2011 after Comcast took control of the newly renamed NBCUniversal. Prior to his exit, he optioned a sixth season revival of Brooklyn Nine-Nine after its cancellation by Fox that year, expressing regret for passing on the series.
George Cheeks and Paul Telegdy	2018–2019	George Cheeks and Paul Telegdy were named co-chairmen of NBC Entertainment after Robert Greenblatt left NBC.
Paul Telegdy	2019–2020	In October 2019, George Cheeks was named Vice Chairman of NBC Content Studios. Paul Telegdy became the sole chairman of NBC Entertainment.
Frances Berwick and Susan Rosner Rovner	2020–2023	On Telegdy's departure in July or August 2020, his role was not filled. The business was restructured into four divisions, with Frances Berwick leading a new Entertainment unit and Susan Rovner later appointed to head Entertainment Content.
Dame Donna Langley-Shamshiri	2023–present	Langley, previously Chairman of Universal Filmed Entertainment Group, was promoted to chairman, NBCUniversal Studio Group & Chief Content Officer in July 2023.
