= Nemasket Hill Cemetery =

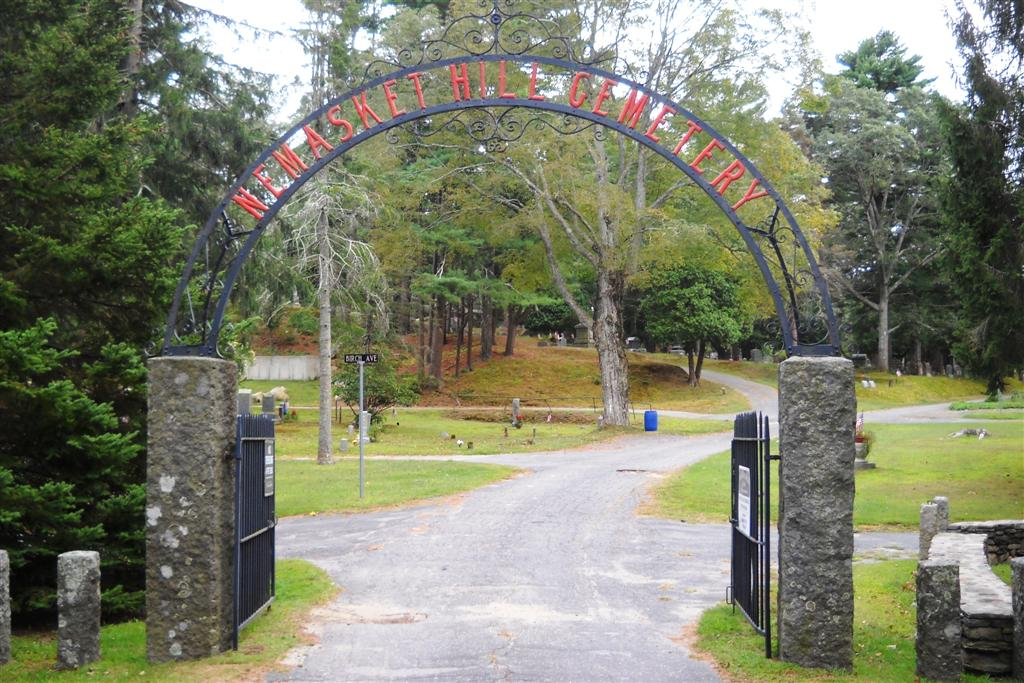
- This is the primary entrance for Nemasket Hill Cemetery
- Interactive map of Nemasket Hill Cemetery

Details
- Established: 1662
- Location: Middleborough, Massachusetts
- Country: United States
- Coordinates: 41.9044°N 70.9022°W
- Owned by: Nemasket Hill Cemetery Association
- Website: https://www.nemaskethillcemetery.com/
- Find a Grave: Nemasket Hill Cemetery

Nemasket Hill Cemetery is located in Middleborough, Massachusetts. It was set aside as a burial ground in 1662, and is the oldest in Middleborough. The oldest engraved headstone here (and within the town of Middleborough) is that of Elizabeth Vaughan, who died on June 24, 1693.

The Nemasket Hill Cemetery Association holds Annual Meetings in April.

The cemetery has been in continuous operation since it was established in 1662. The cemetery was incorporated on March 24, 1885. The Nemasket Cemetery Circle was a group that was active in the early part of the 1900s and they raised funds that financed various cemetery improvement projects. In 1919, a bridge was erected from North Street over the Nemasket River and connected to wooden stairs that ascended the hill to access the cemetery. The bridge is no longer present, but the stairs remain. During the 1920s, a Chapel was built. In 2009, the cemetery added a columbarium.

== Notable burials ==
- Rev. Samuel Fuller (1625–1695) – first minister in the Church in Middleborough and son of Mayflower passenger Samuel Fuller
- Francis Billington (1605-1684) - "Mayflower" passenger
- Samuel Eaton (1620-1684) - "Mayflower" passenger
- Charles Edward Grinnell (1841–1916) – clergyman, lawyer, and writer
- Mary Tomson (1625–1714) – daughter of Mayflower passenger Francis Cooke
- Minnie Warren (1849–1878) – entertainer, sister-in-law of General Tom Thumb
- George Washburn (1833–1915) – educator, missionary, and second president of Robert College
