= Goodrich Social Settlement =

Settlement house in Cleveland, Ohio

Coordinates: 41.5030°N 81.6914°W

Goodrich-Gannett Neighborhood Center
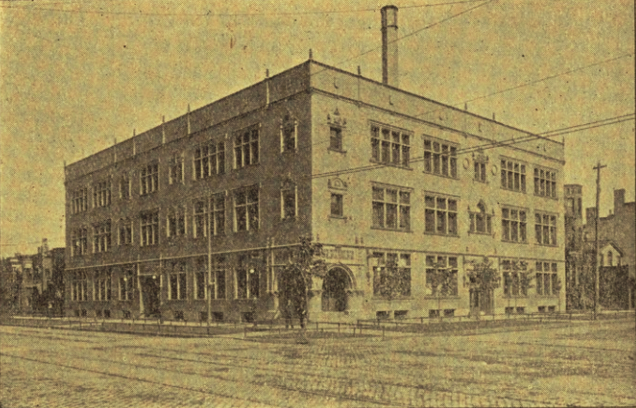
- Goodrich House (1897)
- Named after: Rev. Dr. William Henry Goodrich
- Established: 1897
- Founder: Flora Stone Mather
- Founded at: Bond Street (E. 6th) and St. Clair Avenue, Cleveland, Ohio, US
- Type: Nonprofit
- Purpose: social reform
- Main organ: Goodrich House Record
- Formerly called: Goodrich Social Settlement

Goodrich Social Settlement (since the 1960s, Goodrich-Gannett Neighborhood Center) was the second settlement house in Cleveland, Ohio, after Hiram House. It organized on December 9, 1896, incorporated May 15, 1897, and opened May 20, 1897 at Bond St. (E. 6th) and St. Clair Ave. It was established by Flora Stone Mather as an outgrowth of a boys' club and women's guild conducted by the First Presbyterian Church. Its aims were “to provide a center for such activities as are commonly associated with Christian social settlement work". It was maintained by an endowment. The Goodrich House Farm, in Euclid Point, Ohio, was part of the settlement.

The Goodrich Social Settlement was unique among American settlements in that it was the first of the settlements to possess at the time of its organization a building of considerable size, constructed expressly for its use: Goodrich House. The possession of such a building presented difficulties and imposed responsibilities which were appreciated, at least in part, by those who planned for such a thing and made it possible. The articles of incorporation stated that, "The purpose for which this corporation is formed is to provide a center for such activities as are commonly associated with Christian social settlement work." The incorporation was made to facilitate the work to be carried on in and through Goodrich House, a building erected at a cost of more than US$80,000 by Flora S. Mather.

== Early history ==
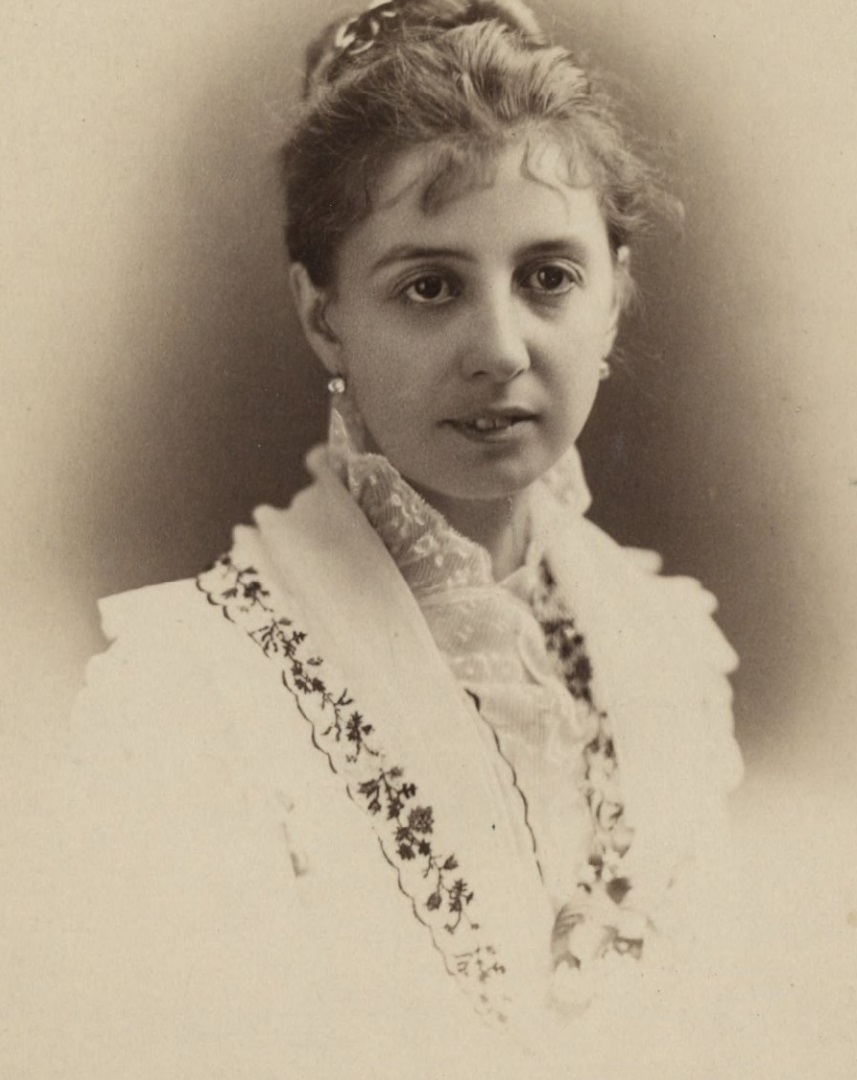
Flora Stone Mather

The idea which gradually grew into Goodrich House came to Flora S. Mather about the year 1894, when she thought of establishing an appropriate building for the social work of the Old Stone Church.

The resulting plan was developed and modified in various particulars after the consideration of several years. Originally the sole idea was to provide a place where the parish work of the First Presbyterian Church could be enlarged, as the work of a church so situated might be. To find a suitable site in the immediate vicinity of the church proved a difficult matter. As time went on, each year showed more convincingly that the field was too large for any one church to care for, and that opportunity was offered for many workers of varied gifts. Finally the present location for the building was fixed upon. Meanwhile the settlement idea had been growing and proving its worth wherever conducted in the right spirit. This led to the conviction that the field here was one where a settlement might be more useful than a parish house.

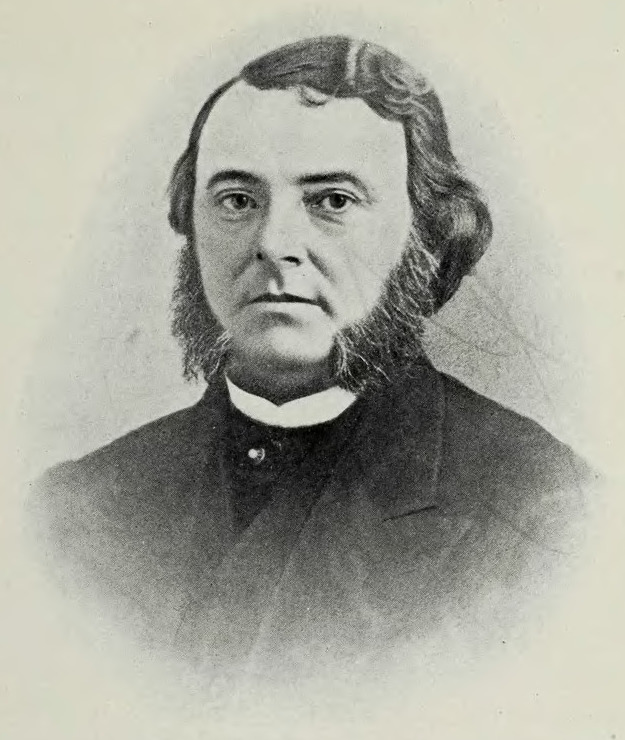
William H. Goodrich

A name for the building was readily available. Twenty-five years earlier Rev. Dr. William Henry Goodrich was pastor of the First Presbyterian Church. Dr. Goodrich combined broad culture with deep sympathy for humanity, and took the greatest interest in the welfare of this locality. His name, suggestive of much that harmonizes with settlement ideals, could be applied with peculiar appropriateness to a home devoted to settlement work. Cleveland, October, 1897.

The settlement was located far downtown in a mixed factory and tenement district. The population was largely of American, Irish, and German extraction, but there were many Poles. The neighborhood, while narrow (only a few blocks wide), was very long (about 2 miles (3.2 km)) and the movement of population tended to put the house at one end of its quarter. Work was also carried on in two cottages at 1416 East Thirty-first Street and the neighboring public school, which was in the geographical center of the Goodrich House constituency.

== Governance ==
The organization known as the Goodrich Social Settlement Corporation had its beginning in December 1896. At that time a few people interested in settlement ideas were asked to come together to consider plans for carrying on the work to be undertaken at Goodrich House, then nearing completion. An informal organization was made by the twelve persons present, officers elected and a committee appointed to draw up a constitution. In January 1897, this committee reported, several amendments were proposed, and the matter was left open until the February meeting, when the constitution, with its various amendments, was adopted.

A few months later, it was felt that more effective work could be done were the association incorporated. A charter was accordingly drawn up, signed by the twelve original members and three additional names, and this charter being granted under the laws of Ohio, the Goodrich Social Settlement Association became an incorporated body May 15, 1897. At incorporation, these were the trustees: Flora S. Mather, Samuel Livingston Mather II, Lucy B. Buell, William E. Cushing, M. R. Swift, Elizabeth H. Haines, Edward W. Haines, Hiram C. Haydn, Charles D. Williams, Sereno P. Fenn, Henry E. Bourne, Samuel E. Williamson, and Glen K. Shurtleff.

The thirteen members of the Board of Trustees, chosen by the members of the corporation from their number, met once a month to hear reports from the various branches of the work and consider any questions that may arise in connection with it. The Executive Committee of Trustees met fortnightly, and was empowered to act upon any matters requiring immediate attention. A Finance Committee, House Committee, Library Committee, and Entertainment Committee looked after the various details that came under these heads.

In 1900, Mather felt that the house had proved itself worthy of permanence, and she therefore presented the deed of the Goodrich house property to the trustees with the following letter:—

"To the Trustees of The Goodrich Social Settlement:

“I hand you with this a deed of Goodrich house, No. 612 St. Clair ave., and I intend to give certain sums from year to year to form an endowment fund for the house. “I desire the house to be used (as named in your articles of incorporation) for a Christian Social settlement so long as, in the judgment of the trustees, that is a useful and needful work in that neighborhood;but if ever in their judgment there comes a time when, through the changed character of the neighborhood, to continue such a work there would be a waster of energy, the trustees may dispose of the property. "The building is constructed so that it can be used for business purposes. My object in erecting the building in the locality was to provide for the social, spiritual and material betterment of the neighborhood, and I want such a work to continue there as long as it is needed.

"If it shall be deemed wibe by the trustees to discontinue the work there, I wish them to use the funds, including the proceeds of any sale of the house, to carry on a similar work in some other downtown locality; but if the coming years bring something better which I have not named, then I wish the trustees to devote the funds to such charitable use as may be best fitted to that end, and as near as may be to that to which the property is now applied.

== Goodrich House ==
Goodrich House was located on the corner of St. Clair and Bond streets, in the downtown district. This district, to outward appearances, was not so densely populated as some other parts of Cleveland. There was, however, much crowding of families into two or three rooms. It was also bad from a sanitary point of view. The population was, for the most part, English-speaking.

The house itself was a substantial building of impervious brick and terra-cotta, with a frontage of 122 feet on St. Clair street and 97 feet on Bond street. The design was Gothic, ornamented with Spanish renaissance detail. Building was begun in April, 1896, and the building was completed, ready for occupancy, in June, 1897. The building consisted of basement, first, second and third stories. The interior was finished throughout in oak. The side walls and ceilings were painted in plain, harmonious colors. The general impression was one of cleanliness and roominess.

Over the inner doorway, on the St. Clair street side, were two inscriptions. The words of the one were from Abraham Lincoln: "With firmness in the right as God gives us to see the right"; the other from John Hay: "He who would rule must first obey."

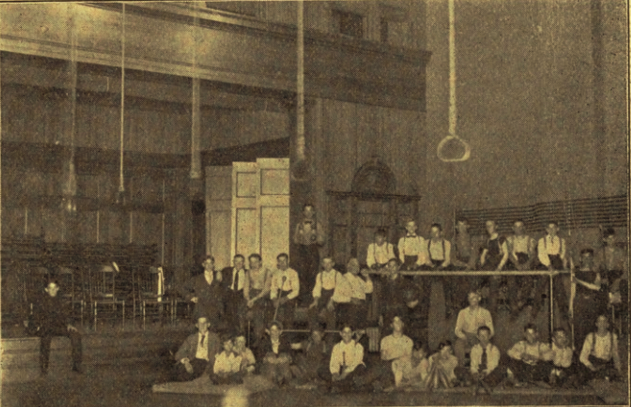
gymnasium

On the first floor were the reading room and library, the gymnasium, the restaurant, the kitchen, the kindergarten and the kitchen garden rooms. The reading room and library, large and well lighted, was fitted with reading tables, paper racks and book cases. An arrangement had been made with the public library whereby such books as were needed for circulation at Goodrich House were furnished by the library.

The gymnasium had a floor space 40 by 46 feet (12 m × 14 m). The apparatus was so arranged that it could be easily removed to change the gymnasium into an audience room with a seating capacity of about 300. A stage and two dressing rooms provided for entertainments.

The restaurant was the corner room, lit from two sides by casement windows. It was used largely as a dining room for the residents and as a refreshment room for club meetings and entertainments. Opening out of the restaurant was the kitchen, conveniently arranged and with ample shelf and cupboard space.

The kindergarten was a room 30 by 34 feet (9.1 m × 10.4 m). Cases fitted in the walls were large enough to contain all supplies. A number of pictures made the room attractive. The tiles about the fireplace depicted rural scenes in which domestic animals and children occupied a prominent place. The kitchen garden consisted of three rooms: kitchen, dining room and bedroom, affording an opportunity for practical instruction in housekeeping.

In the basement were a locker room with 340 lockers, shower/bathroom, bowling alley, washroom, engine and boiler rooms. An open court with a concrete floor and flower beds on either side afforded a "basement garden."

The other part of the basement, which was of special interest, was the laundry, open at a nominal price to the women of the neighborhood. This was fitted with sets of tubs, each supplied with hot and cold water and a steam coil for boiling. A steam drier provides for the quick drying. Women of the neighborhood were enabled to remove the unsanitary processes of washing and drying from already over-crowded home space and sleeping rooms.

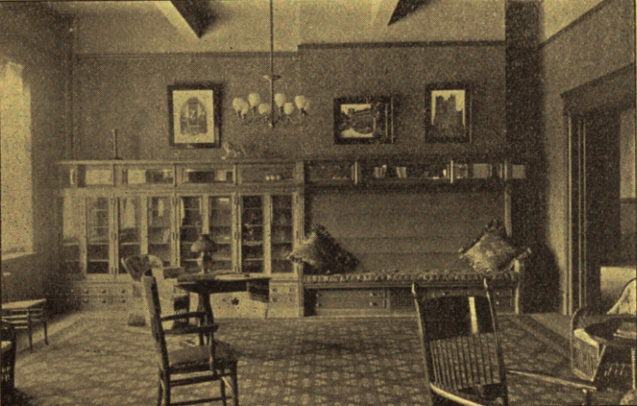
parlor

On the second floor were four class rooms, a game room, two club rooms, two office rooms, a parlor, a small reception room, a sitting room, and bath rooms. The bath rooms on this floor were fitted with porcelain lined tubs, and were designed for the use of women and girls. The finished part of the third floor was divided into rooms for residents. In 1897, twelve person could be accommodated.

== Activities ==
=== 1895–97 ===
Work had been going on for two years, which demonstrated the fact that something might be accomplished in the downtown district of Cleveland along such lines as are followed by settlements in other cities. The need for such effort was soon evident. The possibility of organizing and maintaining boys' clubs was shown by Mr. and Mrs. E. W. Haines, who brought together boys from the street and formed them into clubs, which increased in membership during two or three years to about 200. This was done under circumstances not particularly favorable. The rooms obtainable for a meeting place were unattractive and poorly ventilated; nevertheless, the boys came. The greatest difficulty was that of finding helpers who could or would serve with regularity.

A sewing school for girls drew a considerable number of pupils for some two or three years. The name "Saturday Club" was given to this gathering, and its program was extended to include recreation in addition to the instruction in sewing. In April, 1895, a guild for women, having for its object mutual helpfulness, was organized from the remnants of a mothers' meeting.

These activities were carried on under the auspices of the First Presbyterian Church until Goodrich House was constructed, when they were transferred there to be conducted under its management. These activities, together with one of the kindergartens of the Cleveland Day Nursery and Free Kindergarten Association, for which a room had been provided, formed the nucleus for work when the house was formerly opened, May 20, 1897.

=== 1897-1911 ===
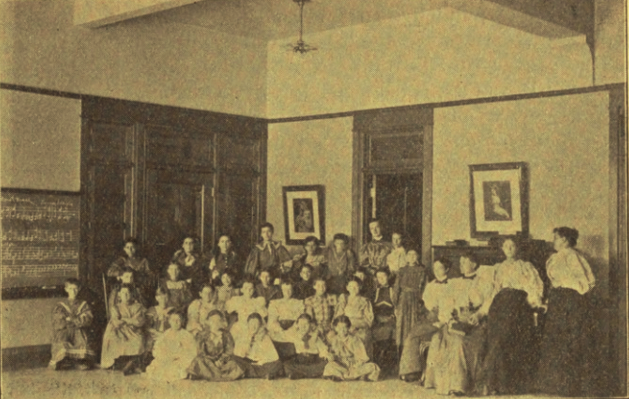
Vacation Club

Various studies of the quarter were made (largely unpublished). Residents supplied material for the Committee of Fifty on the Social Substitutes for the saloon, and for a local housing investigation. The land for the first public playground in Cleveland was purchased by trustees of the house and the playground was conducted under the direction of residents. The city home gardening work originated in the settlement, as did the penny savings work, district nursing, Society for Promoting the Interests of the Blind, the Consumers' League, and other organizations. Residents were of service in the departments of health; education; public charities; in the movement for a "safe and sane Fourth"; for regulating moving pictures; investigating amusement halls; and formulating newsboy legislation.

In 1897, beside the four residents who were in the house at the time of opening, two students from Adelbert College were in residence, one for two months and the other for three months. A few visitors also came, each staying for a few days. Among the outside helpers in the vacation work were five or six young women from the College for Women. The summer months of 1897 supported a vacation club, for girls from 11 to 14 years of age, offered both recreation and instruction to its 44 members on two forenoons of each week during July and August. A club for young women, with a membership of 30, was started. Two classes in singing and a class in stenography had a good average attendance each week.

The report of 1900 showed nine girls' clubs, seven boys' clubs, and six outside organizations.

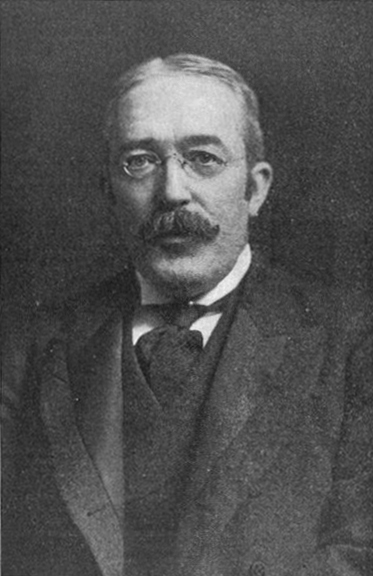
Samuel Livingston Mather II, 1908

In 1903, Samuel Mather presented to the Goodrich Social Settlement an 18 acre summer home on the lake shore at Goodrich Farm, Moss Point, Euclid, Ohio. He equipped with tents, cottages, swimming and boating facilities, and playgrounds. He made arrangements so as to accommodate 50 club members at a time during annual summer vacation.

Gradually, more outside organizations were invited to have their headquarters or meetings at the Goodrich House until the year 1908 showed that there were 19 girls' clubs, fourteen boys' clubs, and 17 outside organizations, such as the Children's Fresh Air camp headquarters, Cooperative Employment bureau for women and girls, Blind Industrial work, Women's Civic and Literary clubs, Principals' Sociological club, Cripple kindergarten, and the Home Gardening association.

In 9109, the work enlarged to the extent of buying two cottages at 1406-1416 East 31st Street, one of which was turned into a boys' and men's club house, and the other into a domestic science cottage for girls and young women.

During the winter of 1908-09, Howard Woolston was lecturer on applied sociology at Western Reserve University, and William Norton carried on the course during the winter of 1909-10. During the year 1909-10, a course somewhat similar to a school of philanthropy was given to 50 social workers at Goodrich House by Professor Cutler, Mr. Norton, and speakers from out of town on special subjects such as housing. The settlement maintained a kindergarten; clinic, nursing service, and milk dispensary; public baths; laundry; employment agency; industrial work for the blind; and playground. There were classes in nursing, cooking, domestic science, sewing, drawing, dancing, modeling, woodwork, pottery, printing, and gymnastics. There were clubs for men (special quarters), women, young people, and children. There was instruction in music, and there was an orchestra. The house was a meeting place for many independent clubs and societies, and there were frequent neighborhood parties, socials, and lectures. The settlement published the Goodrich House Record.

Summer work in 1911 included the playground; infants' health work; children's gardens; excursions and picnics; and a settlement country house which provided accommodations for all ages and was within easy reach of the city. Goodrich Social Settlement also maintained a vacation school for a number of years.

By 1911, there were 12 women and 9 men in residence. Of the volunteers, there were 30 women and 16 men.

=== 1914 ===
With the resettling of immigrants, by 1914, the settlement relocated to Superior Avenue and East 40th Street.

=== 1960s–present ===
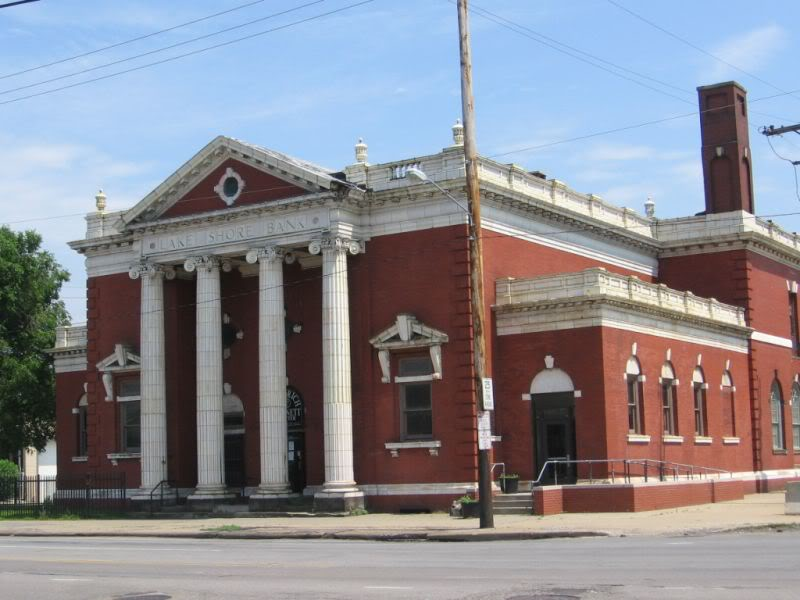
Goodrich-Gannett Neighborhood Center

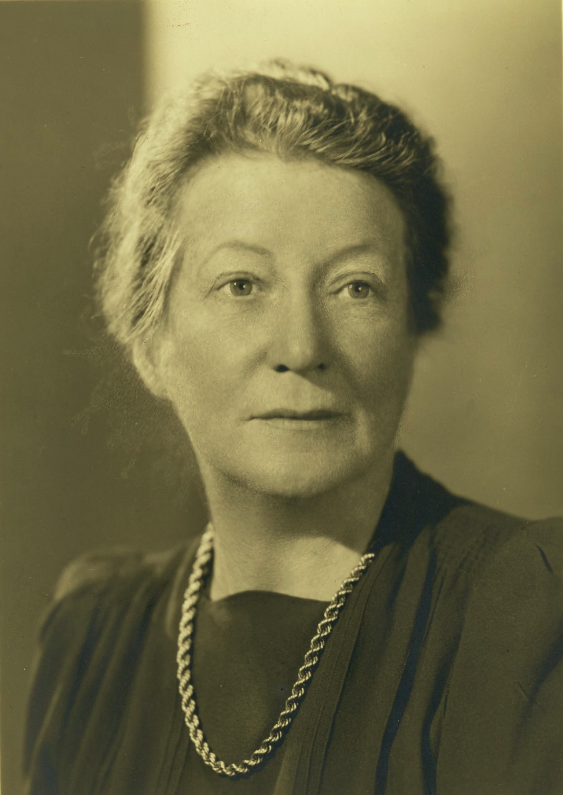
Alice P. Gannett

In the 1960s, a renaming and another move occurred. Now known as the Goodrich-Gannett Neighborhood Center, it honored Rev. Goodrich and Alice P. Gannett, who had been the settlement's long-time head worker. The move was to the vacant Carnegie library on East 55th Street. In 1974, the Goodrich-Gannett Neighborhood Center expanded into the Cleveland Trust Bank after its relocation and donation of the adjacent bank building.

== Notable people ==
- Starr Cadwallader, head residents, 1897-1903
- Marion Campbell, head residents, 1904-5
- J. H. Chase, head residents, 1907-1910
- Alice P. Gannett, the settlement's long-time head worker
- Rev. Dr. William Henry Goodrich, the settlement's namesake
- Flora Stone Mather, founder
- Samuel Livingston Mather II, trustee
- Rufus E. Miles, head residents, 1903-4
- Dr. E. A. Peterson, head residents, 1910
- Howard Woolston, head residents, 1905-7

== See also ==
- Settlement and community houses in the United States
