= Francis Cooke =

Original settler of Plymouth Colony (1583–1663)

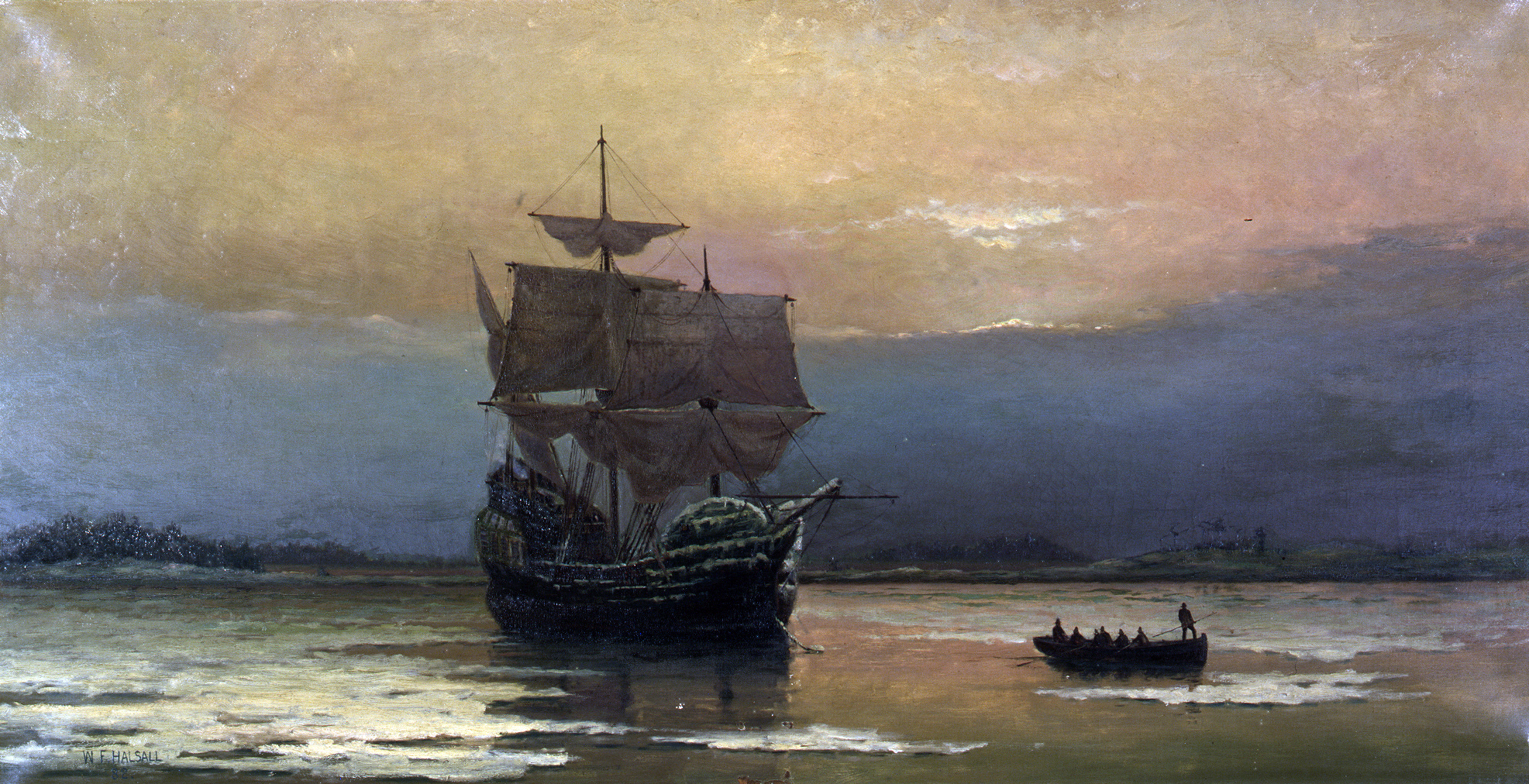
Mayflower in Plymouth Harbor; watercolor by William Halsall, 1882

Francis Cooke (c.1583 – April 7, 1663) was a Leiden Separatist, who went to America in 1620 on the Pilgrim ship Mayflower, which arrived at Plymouth, Massachusetts. He was a founding member of the Massachusetts Bay Colony, and a signer of the Mayflower Compact.

== Early life ==
Cooke's ancestry is unknown, and there are no definite records regarding his birth. (Note: "Author Charles Edward Banks points out that there is at Biddenden, Kent a baptismal record for a child named Francis, a son of Thomas Cooke, dated April 6, 1572. Added to that, there was a considerable Walloon, or French–Belgian, colony in nearby Canterbury (Kent). Banks also speculates that he could have been born in England of foreign parents, who then returned to Holland before April of 1603, when Francis Cooke is recorded witnessing a betrothal in Leiden, Holland. This was six years before the arrival in Leiden of Pastor John Robinson's Pilgrims, who would later be passengers on the Mayflower's voyage to America.") In Plymouth Colony in 1643, Cooke's name appears on the list of those "Able to Bear Arms". This suggests that he was under the age of sixty to be on such a list, and would probably have been born no earlier than 1583.

Cooke's first appearance in the historical record occurs on April 25, 1603, in Leiden, Holland, where he is named a witness at Raphael Roelandt's betrothal. Cooke lived in Leiden for about six years before the 1609 arrival of the congregation of English Separatists led by Pastor John Robinson. Cooke was betrothed to Hester Mahieu at the French Walloon Church in Leyden, the Vrouwekerk ("Church of Our Lady"). She had joined the church one month prior. Her family were Protestant (Walloon) refugees who left Lille in the Spanish Netherlands to escape religious conflict and persecution, and who then left for England. According to historian Charles Edward Banks, Leiden records show Francis Cooke's betrothal to be June 9, 1603. In the Leiden church Betrothal Book, Cooke is recorded as "Franchois Couck" and his bride, Hester Mahieu, with the witnesses to the marriage being two Walloons. They are identified as "..from England..." (Francis) and "...from Canterbury..." (Hester). Cooke and his wife departed Leiden in August 1606 to go to Norwich, England. The Leiden congregation had some Separatist members who had fled from Norwich. The Cooke's did not remain in Norwich long, because their son, John, was baptized at the Walloon Church in Leiden between January and March 1607, and then the couple, identified as "Franchoys Cooke et Esther sa femme" in the Leiden records, received communion on January 1, 1608.

In February 1609, members of Robinson's church came to Leiden. The Cookes did not immediately become members, but did join the Leiden congregation sometime after daughter Elizabeth was baptized on December 26, 1611. When the congregation decided to go to America in 1620, Cooke and his thirteen year–old son John committed to the voyage, but his wife, Hester, and the younger children remained in Leiden, waiting until the colony was better established.

== The Mayflower Voyage ==
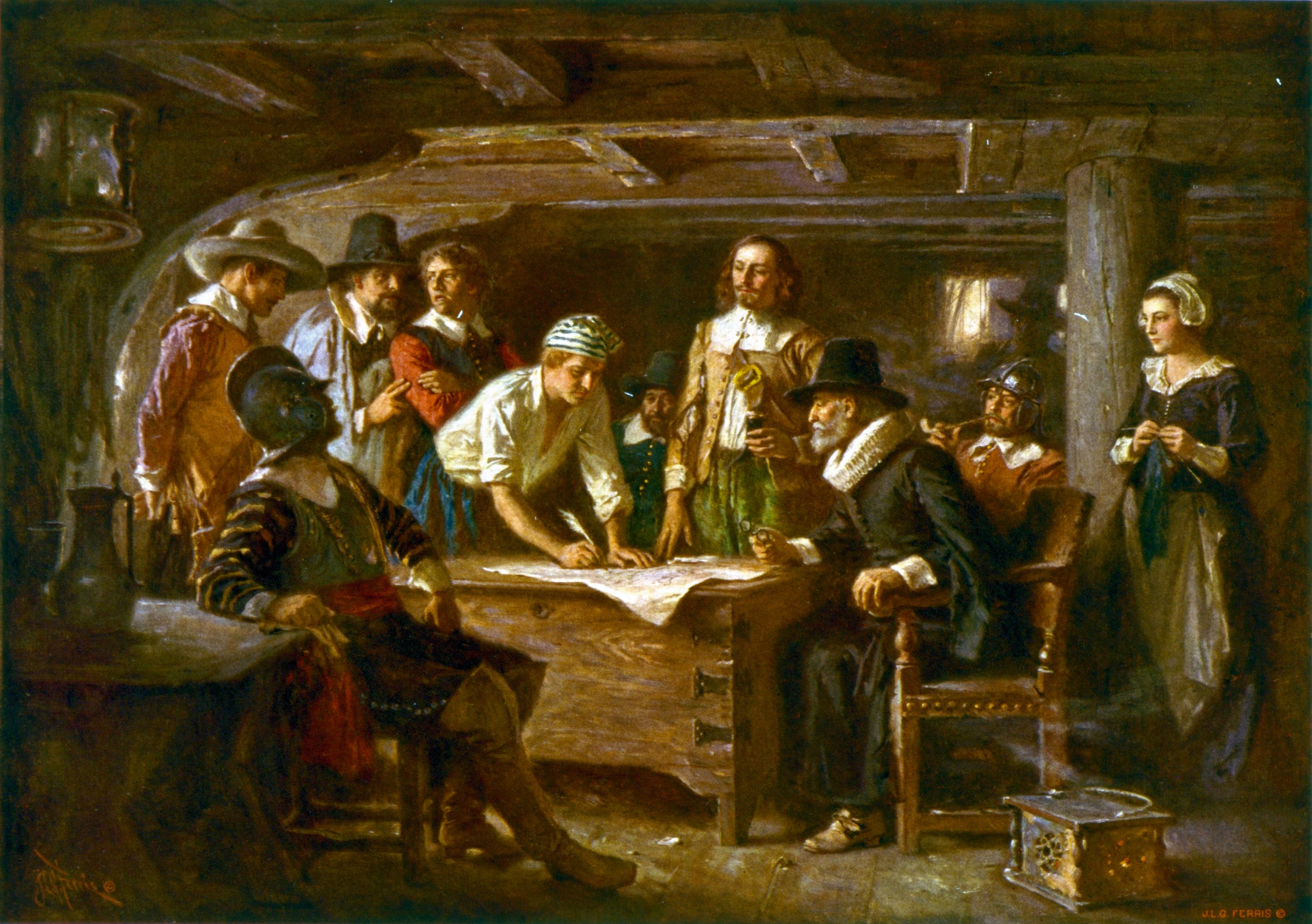
Signing the Mayflower Compact 1620, a painting by Jean Leon Gerome Ferris 1899

The Mayflower departed Plymouth, England, on September 16 [O.S. September 6], 1620. The small, 100-foot ship held 102 passengers and a crew of about 30-40 in extremely cramped quarters. By the second month at sea, the ship was being buffeted by strong westerly gales that caused the ship's timbers to be badly shaken. The caulking failed to keep out seawater, and the passengers—even in their berths—lay wet and ill. This, combined with a lack of proper rations and unsanitary conditions, contributed to the death of a crew member and a passenger.

They spotted Cape Cod Hook (now Provincetown Harbor), on November 19, 1620 [O.S. November 9, 1620] after about nine weeks at sea. The vessel struggled for two days against strong winter seas while they tried to head south to their planned destination of the Virginia Colony. They were forced to abandon the effort, however, and return to the harbor at Cape Cod Hook. There they anchored on November 21 [O.S. November 11]. The Mayflower Compact was signed later that day. Almost half the passengers perished in the cold, harsh, unfamiliar New England winter that followed—in the space of just a few months.

== In Plymouth Colony ==
After the Pilgrims' arrival at Cape Cod, Cooke was one of those who signed the Mayflower Compact on November 11, 1620. William Bradford noted Cooke's presence in his journal: "...Francis Cooke and his son John ... but his wife and children came afterwards."

The plot of land for Cooke's house in New Plymouth was assigned to them late in 1620. It was located between the plots of Isaac Allerton and Edward Winslow. In the Division of Land in 1623, Cooke received two acres, one for himself and one acre for his son John. He also received four "Akers" for his wife and children who "...came ouer in the shipe called the Anne" in 1623.

In his book, Of Plymouth Plantation, 1620-1647, Bradford writes:

Francis Cooke is still living, a very old man, and hath seen his children's children have children. After his wife came over with other of his children; he hath three still living by her, all married and have five children, so their increase is eight. And his son John which came over with him is married and hath four children living.

There was an agreement signed in 1626 in which fifty-eight planters, including Cooke and many other "first comers", later known as "Purchasers", bought from the Merchant Adventurers from London all their colony stock, shares, and land. Later these Purchasers assigned all shares and debts in the company to eight Plymouth notables, and four former Merchant Adventurers, then to be known as "Undertakers". This was to be an investment organization with profits going largely to the colony.

In the 1627 Division of Cattle at Plymouth, Cooke and Hester are mentioned: "The first lot fell to Francis Cooke & his Companie Joyned to his wife Hester Cooke." [sic] Also named in the 1627 records were their children John, Jacob, Jane, Hester, and Mary as well as two men—Cooke's nephew Phillip Delanoy (Delano) and Experience Mitchell, who married Cooke's daughter, Jane, soon after.

On January 3, 1627/8, Cooke was one of six men named to lay out the boundaries for the twenty-acre land grants that would be made to everyone who came as a planter, under the employ of the joint-stock company. In early 1633, Cooke was assigned by the court to help resolve a dispute of a financial nature between Peter Browne and Dr. Samuel Fuller. These men are believed the men of the same names who were companions of Cooke on the Mayflower voyage, both dying later in 1633. During the 1630s and 1640s, Cooke held several public sector positions but was never in government or politics. In 1634, he was one of several Plymouth men tasked with laying out the highways. In 1637 he was appointed, along with others, to lay highways about the towns of Plymouth, Duxbury, and Eel River. Cooke and the others performed the task and two months later reported back to the Plymouth Court.

On October 1, 1636, John Harmon, son of Edmund Harmon, tailor, of London, became an apprentice to Cooke for seven years.

Cooke was awarded damages by the court on March 7, 1636/7 in a civil case involving the abuse of his cattle against Mr. John Browne the younger, who had previously been an assistant and magistrate. Others also charged, all being in the service of John Browne the elder and Thomas Willet, were Thomas Lettice, James Walker, and Thomas Teley. On June 7, 1637, due to Browne's failure to the damages, the court reaffirmed the verdict and ordered John Browne to pay.

In May 1640, Cooke and his son John were among those tasked to compute the number of acres of Edward Doty's meadows and make a report to the next court.

In October 1640, Cooke was appointed to compute the land boundaries between Thomas Prence and Clement Briggs at Jones River.

In 1640/41 he was one of twelve men tasked by the court to designate additional highways, and make a formal survey and mark the boundaries of plots of land in the town of Plain Dealing. The next year he was one of four Plymouth surveyors and was tasked to survey the highway for Jones River. In 1645 he was again highway surveyor for Plymouth. In June 1650, when he was almost seventy, he was still doing survey work, as when he and twelve others reported to the court that they had marked a new way from Jones River to the Massachusetts Path through John Rogers property. And even in August 1659, in his late 70s, he was again called upon by the Plymouth Court to resolve a land boundary dispute between Thomas Pope and William Shurtliff.

Although he was specially qualified to survey new highways, he did do other public service work, being on several petty and grand juries. He also served on civil case juries in late 1639, March 1640, mid-and-late 1642, and March 1643 court sessions. Most of the civil cases involved trespass, debts, or slander. He was also on grand juries in 1638, 1640, 1642, and 1643, which involved crimes of a misdemeanor or felony nature.

In 1643, Able to Bear Arms (ATBA) List, Cooke and his sons Jacob and John ("John Cooke, Jnr, his boy") are listed with those from Plymouth.

In 1651, Bradford recorded his impression of Cooke and his family in his later years: "Francis Cooke is still living, a very old man, and hath seen his children's children have children; after his wife came over, (with other of his children,) he hath 3 still living by her, all married, and have 5 children; so their increase is 8. And his son John, which came over with him, is married, and hath 4 children living."

On June 3, 1662, the General Court approved a list of thirty-three names "as being the firstborn children of this government," to receive two tracts of land purchased from the Indians by the colony. The list was wider in scope than just being for "firstborn" settlers, as it named several of the original Mayflower passengers, including Cooke, but was presumably for their children.

== Family ==
Cooke married Hester Mahieu in Leiden, Holland, on July 20, 1603, or shortly thereafter. They had seven children. The birth order of the Cooke children is uncertain.

- John was baptized in Leiden, Holland between January and March 1607 and died in Dartmouth on November 23, 1695. He married Sarah Warren on March 28, 1634, in Plymouth and had five children. She died after July 15, 1696.
- a child was buried in Leiden on May 20, 1608.
- Jane was born about 1609 in Leiden. She married Experience Mitchell in Plymouth after May 22, 1627. Her date of death is unknown, as is the date of his second marriage. But his first three children are generally considered to be hers.
- Elizabeth was baptized in Leiden on December 26, 1611, and later married Daniel Wilcox (date unknown)
- Jacob was born about 1618 and died in Plymouth in December 1675. He was buried at Tyler Point Cemetery, Barrington, R.I.

He married 1. Damaris Hopkins shortly after June 10, 1646, in Plymouth and had seven children. Her father was Mayflower passenger Stephen Hopkins. 2. Elizabeth (Lettice) Shurtleff on November 18, 1669, in Plymouth and had two children.

- Hester was born about 1620 in Leiden and died between 1669 and 1691. She married Richard Wright in Plymouth in 1644 and had six children. She was buried at Burial Hill in Plymouth, Mass.
- Mary was born in Plymouth about 1625 and died in Middleborough on March 21, 1714. She married John Tomson on December 26, 1645, in Plymouth. Both Mary and John were buried at Nemasket Hill Cemetery, Middleborough, Massachusetts.

== Will, death and burial of Francis Cooke ==
Francis Cooke died in Plymouth on April 7, 1663, and was buried on Burial Hill in Plymouth. An inventory of his estate was taken on May 1, 1663. From his estate inventory, it appears that he was involved with sheep and wool as he had sixteen sheep and five lambs, a "woolen wheele & scales," three pairs of sheep shears, and twenty pounds of wool.
