= Herbert Schlosser =

American television executive (1926–2021)

- Born: Herbert Samuel Schlosser; April 21, 1926; Atlantic City, New Jersey, U.S.
- Died: August 6, 2021 (aged 95); Manhattan, New York, U.S.
- Education: Princeton University
- Occupation: Television executive
- Known for: Saturday Night Live co-founder of A&E
- Spouse: Judith Gassner
- Children: 2, including Eric

Herbert Samuel Schlosser (April 21, 1926 – August 6, 2021) was an American television executive. He was president of NBC from 1974 until 1978. He also briefly served as its CEO from 1977 to 1978.

== Early life ==
Schlosser was born in Atlantic City, New Jersey, on April 21, 1926. His father, Abraham, ran his own furniture store; his mother, Anna (Olesker), was a housewife. He graduated from Atlantic City High School. He served in the US Navy and was stationed in the contiguous United States. He then studied public and international affairs at Princeton University. After graduating in 1949, he went to Yale Law School and obtained a Juris Doctor in 1951.

== Career ==
Schlosser began his career as a corporate lawyer for the New York firm Phillips, Nizer, Benjamin, Krim & Ballon, where he first started working on television projects. He joined the business affairs department of the NBC Television Network in 1960, personally negotiating the agreements that brought Johnny Carson from ABC to NBC to host The Tonight Show. He became the president of the NBC Television Network in 1973, and in 1974, he was named president of NBC. Three years later, he was also named NBC's CEO. While at NBC, he helped champion the careers of Flip Wilson, Diahann Carroll, and Redd Foxx, among others. Fred Silverman replaced Schlosser in 1978.

=== Proposal of Saturday Night Live ===
Schlosser played a key role in the creation of Saturday Night Live, authoring a February 1975 memo that proposed a new variety show to replace weekend re-runs of Johnny Carson's The Tonight Show.

Schlosser's memo suggested that the show be called "Saturday Night", that it should air at 11:30, and that "if possible the show should be done live" and should seek to "get different hosts". "It would be a variety show", he wrote, "but it would have certain characteristics. It should be young and bright. It should have a distinctive look, a distinctive set and a distinctive sound … We should attempt to use the show to develop new television personalities." He said the show should be filmed in Studio 8H at 30 Rockefeller Plaza.

Schlosser worked with NBC's then head of late-night entertainment, Dick Ebersol, who recruited Lorne Michaels to create Saturday Night Live, which premiered on October 11, 1975.

== Later career ==
Schlosser became an executive vice president at RCA, NBC's parent, in 1978. During his tenure, he co-founded the television network A&E. Schlosser later went to Wertheim & Co. as senior adviser in 1985. That year, he also became chairman of the Museum of the Moving Image, which was inaugurated three years later. He continued serving in that capacity until 2013.

== Personal life ==
Schlosser was married to Judith Gassner until his death. Together, they had two children, Eric, an author, and Lynn, who followed her father and became a television executive.

Schlosser died on August 6, 2021, at his home in Manhattan. He was 95 years old.
