= Fred Silverman =

American television executive (1937–2020)

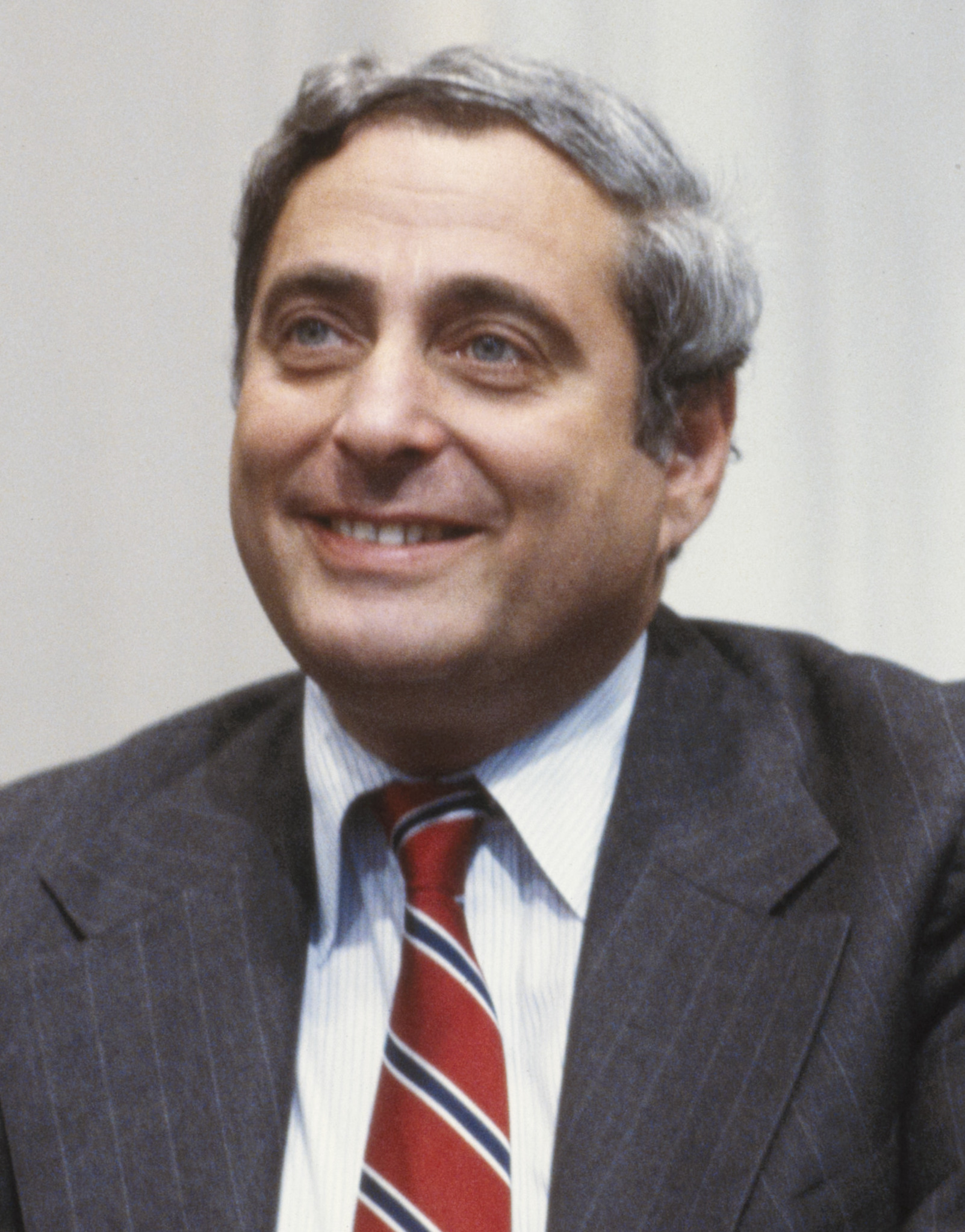
- Silverman in 1979
- Born: September 13, 1937; New York City, U.S.
- Died: January 30, 2020 (aged 82); Los Angeles, California, U.S.
- Resting place: Mount Sinai Memorial Park Cemetery
- Education: Syracuse University; Ohio State University
- Occupations: Television executive; producer
- Spouse: Catherine Ann Kihn (m. 1971)
- Children: 2

Fred Silverman (September 13, 1937 – January 30, 2020) was an American television executive and producer. He worked as an executive at all of the Big Three television networks, and was responsible for bringing to television such programs as Scooby-Doo, Where Are You! (the original incarnation of the Scooby-Doo franchise, 1969–1970), All in the Family (1971–1979), The Waltons (1972–1981), and Charlie's Angels (1976–1981), as well as the miniseries Rich Man, Poor Man (1976), Roots (1977), and Shōgun (1980). For his success in programming such shows, Time magazine declared him "The Man with the Golden Gut" in 1977.

== Biography ==
=== Early life and career ===
Silverman was born in New York City, the son of Mildred, a homemaker, and William Silverman, a radio and television service repairman. His father was Jewish and his mother was Catholic. He grew up in Rego Park, Queens, and attended Forest Hills High School. He graduated with a bachelor's degree from Syracuse University, where he was a member of Alpha Epsilon Pi fraternity, and then earned a master's degree from Ohio State University. His 406-page masters thesis analyzed ten years worth of ABC programming and led to his hiring at WGN-TV in Chicago. At WGN, Silverman pioneered the concept of airing family-friendly feature films in prime time with Family Classics, which later inspired the major networks to do the same. This was followed by positions at WPIX in New York, and then at CBS. His first job at CBS was to oversee the network's daytime programming. Silverman married his assistant, Cathy Kihn, and they had a daughter, Melissa, and son, William.

=== CBS ===
In 1970, Silverman was promoted from vice-president of program planning and development to vice president, Programs, heading the entire program department at CBS. Silverman was promoted to bring a change in perspective for the network, as it had just forced out the previous executive in that position, Michael Dann; Dann's philosophy was to draw as many viewers as possible without regard to key demographics, which the network found to be unacceptable, as advertisers were becoming more specific about what kind of audience they were aiming for. To boost viewership in demographics that were believed to be more willing to respond to commercials, Silverman orchestrated the "rural purge" of 1971, which eventually eliminated many popular country-oriented shows, such as Green Acres, Mayberry R.F.D., Hee Haw, and The Beverly Hillbillies from the CBS schedule. In their place came a new wave of shows aimed at the upscale baby boomer generation, such as All in the Family, The Mary Tyler Moore Show, M*A*S*H, The Waltons, Cannon, Barnaby Jones, Kojak, and The Sonny & Cher Comedy Hour.

Silverman spun off Maude and The Jeffersons from All in the Family, and Rhoda from The Mary Tyler Moore Show (as well as The Bob Newhart Show from MTM Enterprises' writers). In early 1974, Silverman ordered a Maude spin-off titled Good Times; that series' success led Silverman to schedule it against ABC's new hit, Happy Days, the following fall.

In other dayparts, Silverman also reintroduced game shows to the network's daytime lineups in 1972 after a four-year absence; among the shows Silverman introduced was an updated version of the 1950s game show The Price Is Right, which remains on the air over five decades later. After the success of The Price Is Right, Silverman established a working relationship with Mark Goodson and Bill Todman and most of their game shows appeared on CBS, including a revival of Match Game.

On Saturday mornings, Silverman commissioned Hanna-Barbera to produce the series Scooby-Doo, Where Are You! and the character Fred Jones, who at first was called "Ronnie," is named after Silverman. The success of Scooby-Doo led to several other Hanna-Barbera series airing on CBS in the early 1970s. Lou Scheimer, the co-founder of animation studio Filmation, said that Silverman "created the Saturday morning phenomenon."

=== Move to ABC ===
Silverman was named president of ABC Entertainment in 1975, putting him in the ironic position of saving Happy Days, the very show that Good Times had brought to the brink of cancellation. Silverman succeeded in bringing Happy Days to the top of the ratings and generating a hit spin-off from that show, Laverne & Shirley (another spin-off, Mork & Mindy, was also a ratings winner initially ending its first season at number three but the ratings quickly free fell).

At ABC, Silverman also greenlit other popular series such as The Bionic Woman (a Six Million Dollar Man spin-off), Family, Charlie's Angels, Donny & Marie, Three's Company, Eight Is Enough, The Love Boat, Soap, Fantasy Island, Good Morning America, long-form pioneer Rich Man, Poor Man, and the award-winning miniseries, Roots. These moves brought ABC's long-dormant ratings from third place to first place. However, Silverman was criticized during this period for relying heavily on escapist fare (it was Silverman who conceived the infamous The Brady Bunch Hour with Sid and Marty Krofft in late 1976) and for bringing T&A or "jiggle TV" to the small screen with numerous ABC shows featuring buxom, attractive, and often scantily-clad young women (such as the popular Battle of the Network Stars).

ABC Daytime had mediocre ratings, so in order to increase them, Silverman hired Gloria Monty to produce the ailing General Hospital. He gave Monty thirteen weeks to increase the serial's ratings or it would be cancelled. He later expanded General Hospital, All My Children, and One Life to Live to a full hour, and created a 3 1/2-hour afternoon serial block. Among game shows, Silverman introduced Goodson and Todman's Family Feud to the network.

During Silverman's time at ABC, he overhauled the network's Saturday-morning cartoon output, dumping Filmation (which had produced Scheimer's failed Uncle Croc's Block) and replacing it with content from Hanna-Barbera, including a continuation of Scooby-Doo, along with more Krofft content such as The Krofft Supershow. He also oversaw the creation of Ruby-Spears Productions, poaching two of Hanna-Barbera's lead writers, Joe Ruby and Ken Spears, to produce their own content in hopes of keeping Hanna-Barbera from becoming complacent. ABC abandoned the wiping of video-taped programs under Silverman's tenure in 1978, as CBS had done while he was at that network.

=== Move to NBC ===
Although Silverman's tenure at ABC was very successful, he left to become president and CEO of NBC in 1978. In stark contrast with his tenures at CBS and ABC, his three-year tenure at NBC proved to be a difficult period, marked by several high-profile failures such as the sitcom Hello, Larry, the variety shows The Big Show and Pink Lady, the drama Supertrain (which also was, at the time, the most expensive TV series produced; its high production costs and poor ratings nearly bankrupted NBC), and the Jean Doumanian era of Saturday Night Live. (Silverman hired Doumanian after Al Franken, the planned successor for outgoing Lorne Michaels, castigated Silverman's failures on-air in a way that Silverman took very personally.) Even in daytime, the network struggled as the expansion of Another World from 60 to 90 minutes drove away not only viewers, but longtime head writer Harding Lemay, while Regis Philbin's talk show proved to be nowhere near as popular as his later syndicated talk show would prove to be. Compounding this was the 1980 Summer Olympics boycott costing the network millions in lost ad revenue, and multiple industry strikes pushing back the premieres of new shows.

Despite these failures, there were high points in Silverman's tenure at NBC, including the launch of the critically lauded Hill Street Blues (1981), the epic mini-series Shōgun, and The David Letterman Show (daytime, 1980), which would lead to Letterman's successful Late Night with David Letterman in 1982. Silverman had Letterman in a holding deal after the morning show which kept the unemployed Letterman from going to another network (NBC gave Letterman $20,000 per week [$1,000,000 for a year] to sit out a year). However, Silverman nearly lost his then-current late night host, market leader Johnny Carson, after Carson sued NBC in a contract dispute; the case was settled out of court and Carson remained with NBC in exchange for the rights to his show and a reduction in time on air, along with a deal with Carson Entertainment Group that eventually resulted in the hit TV sitcom Amen as well as the TV's Bloopers and Practical Jokes series and specials along with a handful of shows that proved short-lived.

Silverman also developed successful comedies such as Diff'rent Strokes, The Facts of Life, and Gimme a Break!. Silverman also pioneered entertainment reality programming with the 1979 launch of Real People. His contributions to the network's game show output included Goodson and Todman's Card Sharks and Password Plus, both of which enjoyed great success in the morning schedule, although he also canceled several other relatively popular series, including The Hollywood Squares and High Rollers, to make way for The David Letterman Show (those cancellations also threatened Wheel of Fortune, whose host, Chuck Woolery, departed the show in a payment dispute during Silverman's tenure, although the show survived). Silverman also oversaw the hiring of Pat Sajak as the new host of Wheel of Fortune in 1981, a position that Sajak would hold for 43 years, although Silverman himself objected to Sajak's hiring. On Saturday mornings, in a time when most of the cartoon output of the three networks was similar, Silverman oversaw the development of an animated series based on The Smurfs; the animated series The Smurfs ran from 1981 to 1990, well after Silverman's departure, making it one of his longest-lasting contributions to the network.

In other areas of NBC, Silverman revitalized the news division, which resulted in Today and NBC Nightly News achieving parity with their competition for the first time in years. He created a new FM Radio Division, with competitive full-service stations in New York, Chicago, San Francisco and Washington. During his NBC tenure, Silverman also brought in an entirely new divisional and corporate management, a team that stayed in place long after Silverman's departure. (Among this group was a new Entertainment President, Brandon Tartikoff, who would help get NBC back on top by 1985.) Silverman also reintroduced the peacock as NBC's corporate logo in the form of the proud 'N' (which combined the peacock with the 1975 trapezoid 'N' logo) in 1979; the logo was used until 1986.

=== Foundation of The Fred Silverman Company ===
In 1981, Silverman left NBC and formed The Fred Silverman Company (formerly Intermedia Entertainment) to produce shows to sell to television. The company would generate several hits including the Perry Mason TV movie series (1985–1994), Matlock (1986–1995), Jake and the Fatman (1987–1992), In the Heat of the Night (1988–1995), Father Dowling Mysteries (1987–1991), and Diagnosis: Murder (1993–2001). Most of these continue to run in syndication. Most of these series were co-produced with Dean Hargrove and Viacom Productions.

==== History ====
After he quit NBC, Silverman formed his own production company in order to sign a deal with MGM and United Artists, who had specialized in film and television production, with George Reeves as Silverman's partner. Shortly afterwards, he named his production company InterMedia Entertainment Co. In 1982, Silverman had sixteen development projects, but none of them got to series. It was reported that the company was working on The World of Entertainment with Gene Kelly.

In 1982, his InterMedia Entertainment Company had partnered with Marvel Productions to create a joint venture. In 1983, he partnered with Alan Thicke, along with Metromedia Producers Corporation for a syndicated late night show Thicke of the Night, which was designed to compete against The Tonight Show Starring Johnny Carson. After several failed attempts to sell a primetime show, Silverman and MGM/UA successfully sold We Got It Made to NBC in 1983. It didn't catch on and was gone after one season, although it did see a one-year revival in syndication for the 1987 season.

In 1984, Silverman secured a deal with Walt Disney Pictures to produce theatrical motion pictures, with the first release slated by late 1985, but it never happened. Silverman also produced the first Perry Mason telemovie, which came out in 1985, and marked the first writing-producing collaboration partnership between Silverman, writer Dean Hargrove and production company Viacom Productions.

Silverman also produced, with Earl Hamner, the drama Morningstar/Eveningstar, which was produced by Lorimar Productions and debuted on CBS in 1986. Later that year, he reunited with We Got It Made producer Gordon Farr and movie studio De Laurentiis Entertainment Group (DEG) to produce Isabel Sanford's Honeymoon Hotel for access syndication, which aired a trial week in January 1987, but was cancelled after DEG went bankrupt just before production was set to resume. Silverman and Farr also produced the sitcom California Girls, with DEG and Viacom as distributor, but it failed to sell. It was around that time that InterMedia was renamed The Fred Silverman Company. Also later that year, NBC had reached a deal with syndicator MGM Television to revive We Got it Made for the 1987–88 season in syndication.

Silverman also produced One of the Boys for NBC, in association with Stefan Phillips, Blake Hunter, Martin Cohan and Columbia Pictures Television.

Returning to his roots in children's television, Silverman commissioned an adaptation of the teen horror comedy book series Bone Chillers for television in 1996, admittedly as a ripoff of the television adaptation of Goosebumps. Though he and his network ABC had high expectations for the new series, Bone Chillers was unsuccessful and was cancelled midseason.

During the game-show revival that followed the success of Who Wants to Be a Millionaire, Silverman resurrected the 1950s game show Twenty-One for NBC in 2000. A few years later, he returned to ABC in an advisory capacity.

In 1995, he was awarded the Women in Film Lucy Award in recognition of excellence and innovation in creative works that have enhanced the perception of women through the medium of television. In 1999, Silverman was inducted into the Academy of Television Arts and Sciences Hall of Fame.

=== Death ===
Silverman died from cancer on January 30, 2020, at his home in the Pacific Palisades neighborhood of Los Angeles. He was 82.

Business positions
Preceded by Michael Dann	Vice President, Programs CBS Television Network; 1970–1975	Succeeded by Lee Currlin
Preceded by Martin Starger	President, ABC Entertainment; 1975–1978	Succeeded by Anthony Thomopoulos
Preceded by Herbert Schlosser (president)	President/CEO of NBC; 1978–1981	Succeeded by Grant Tinker (CEO)
Preceded by Herbert Schlosser	President of NBC Entertainment; 1978–1981	Succeeded by Brandon Tartikoff
