= Old Stone Church (Cleveland) =

Historic church in Ohio, United States

- U.S. National Register of Historic Places
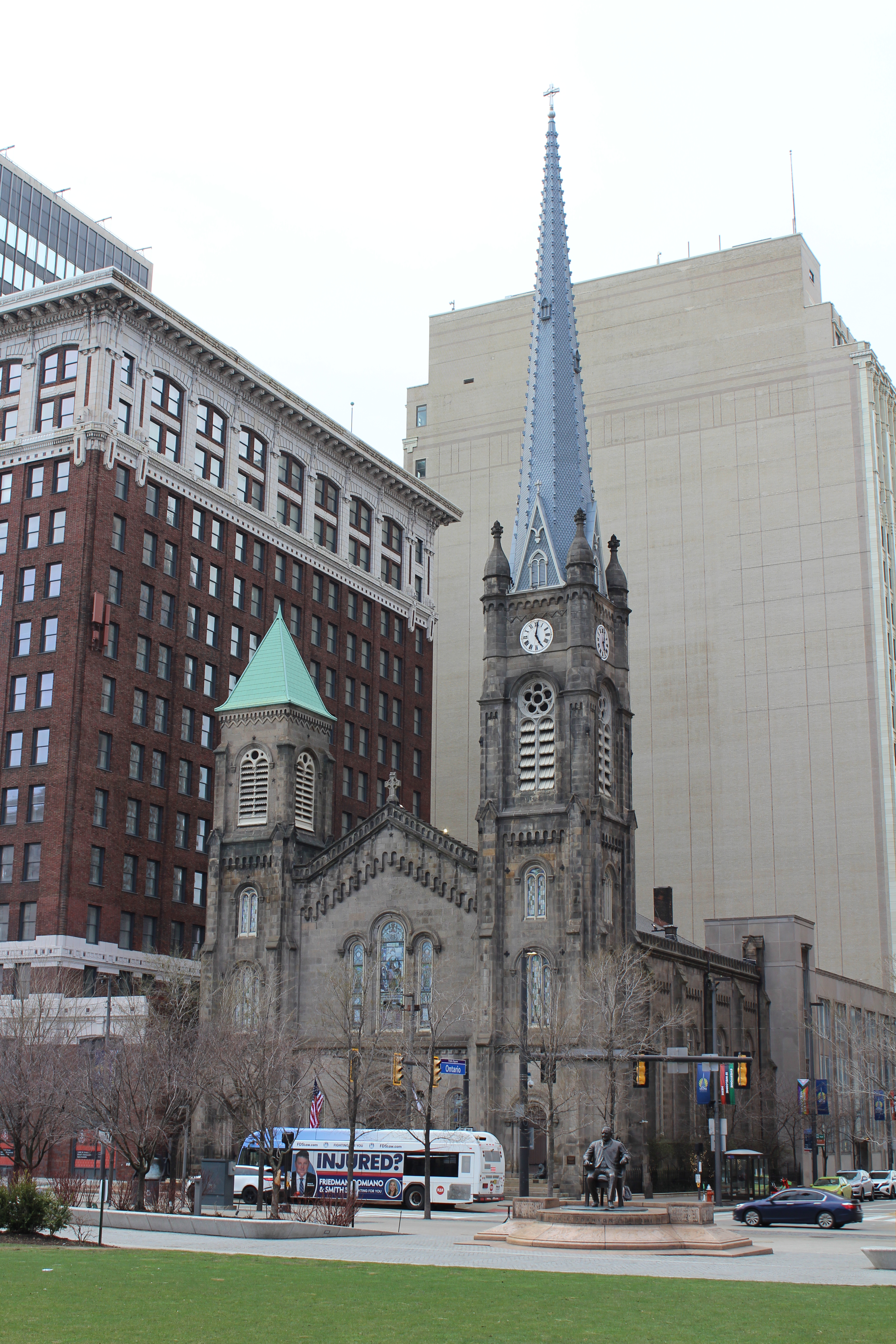
- The Old Stone Church in 2023
- Location: 91 Public Square Cleveland, Ohio 44113
- Coordinates: 41°30′1″N 81°41′41″W
- Built: 1855
- Architect: Heard & Porter; Schweinfurth, Charles
- Architectural style: Romanesque
- NRHP reference No.: 73001414
- Added to NRHP: February 23, 1973

The Old Stone Church is a historic Presbyterian church located in downtown Cleveland, Ohio, and is the oldest building on Public Square. It is also the second church built within the city limits.

== History ==
In June 1819, the Union Sunday School began meeting on the site of the current church, and on September 19, 1820, fifteen Clevelanders, some ten percent of the then-village's population, signed a charter officially establishing the congregation. It was formally incorporated in 1827 as The First Presbyterian Society, and in 1834 the first church was built out of gray sandstone. The interior featured a gallery suspended by iron rods, reportedly a first in a Cleveland public building, as well as the city's first pipe organ. Because of its building materials, First Presbyterian was called "the Stone Church," and as other stone churches were erected in the area, it became known as the "Old Stone Church."

By 1853, the congregation had outgrown the original building, so the church was razed, and a larger replacement was built on the same spot. The Romanesque Revival church, dedicated on August 12, 1855, was also made of local sandstone, and was designed by architects Charles Heard and Simeon Porter.

=== A series of fires ===
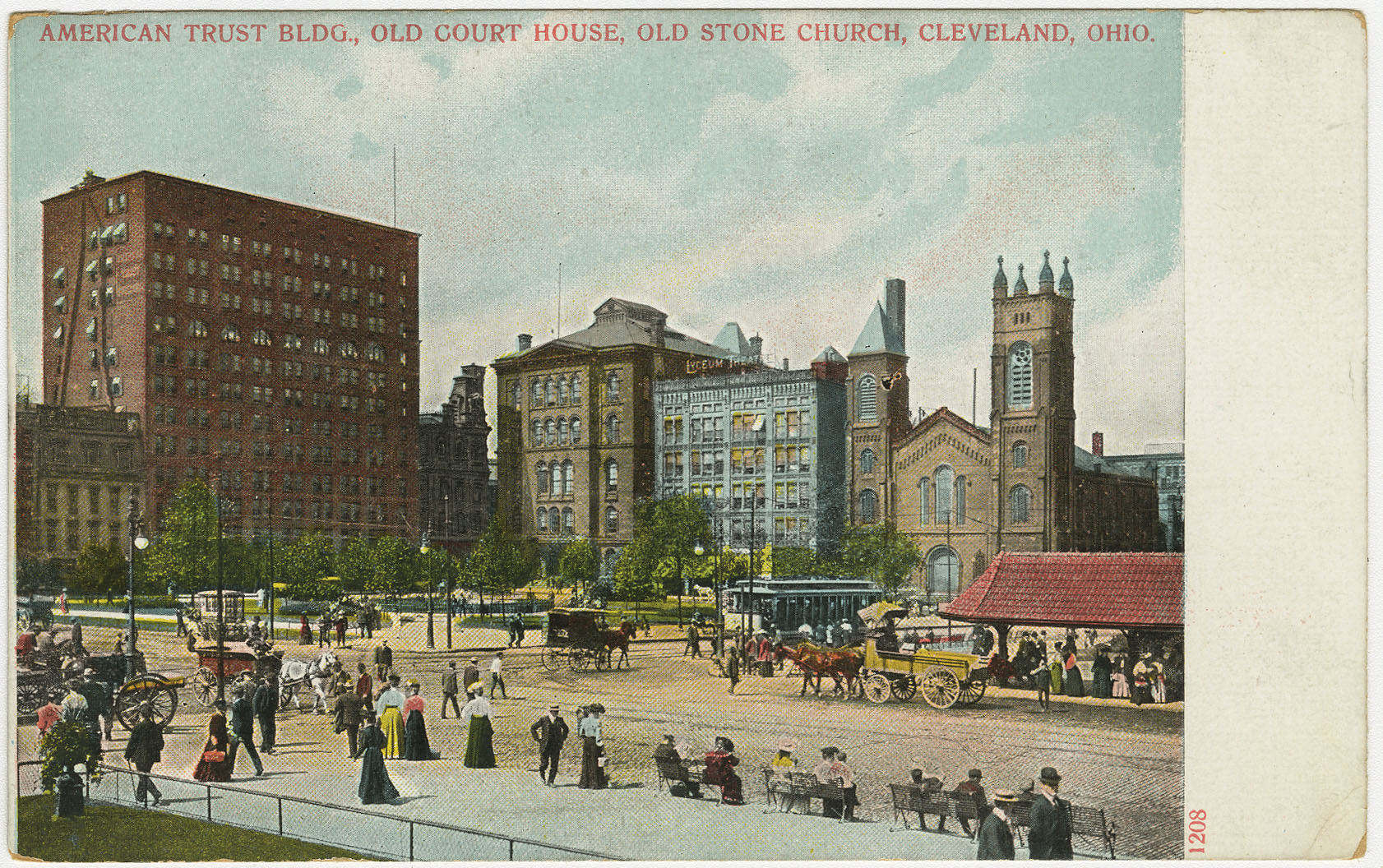
Old Stone Church on Public Square circa 1910

Nineteen months later, on March 7, 1857, fire struck the church. Water from the hand-pumped fire engines was unable to reach the 250-foot steeple, which came crashing down onto Ontario Street.

Despite this, the building remained mostly intact, and reconstruction began almost immediately. The church was rededicated on January 17, 1858.

The second fire occurred on January 5, 1884, spreading to the church from the adjoining Wick Building's Park Theater. Despite the sturdy construction of the building, the interior was gutted. Afterward, the congregation considered a move to E. 55th Street and Euclid Avenue, but it was eventually decided to keep the original location, after pressure from influential members including John Hay.

Architect Charles Schweinfurth was hired to head the reconstruction of the church, which was dedicated on October 19, 1884. Subsequent additions to the church include three Louis Comfort Tiffany stained glass windows, a John La Farge triple window overlooking Public Square, and a Holtkamp Organ Company organ.

== Present day ==
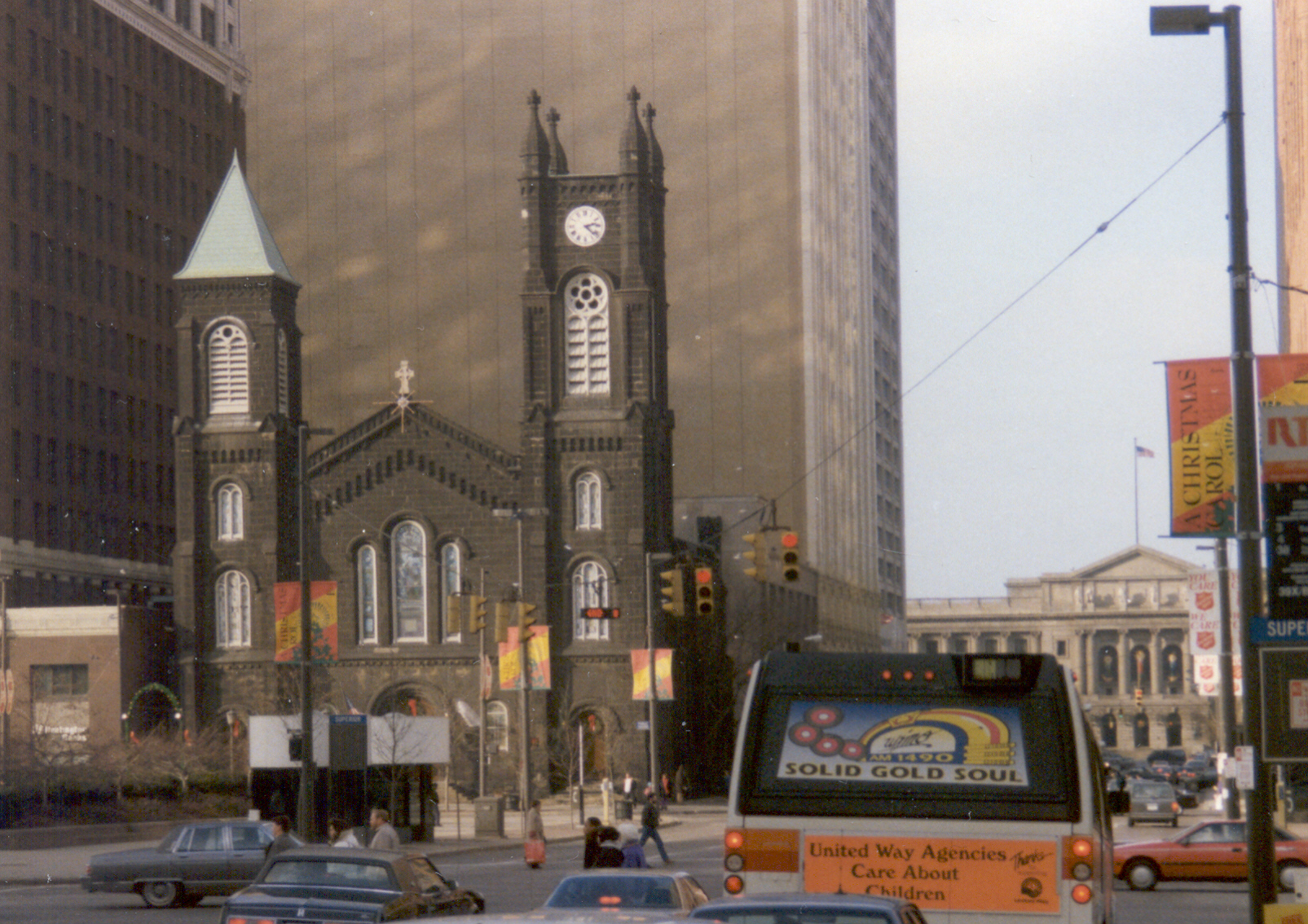
The church prior to the restoration project

The Old Stone Church has stood virtually unchanged to this day, and is the last remaining church designed by the Heard and Porter architectural firm. The only major modification was the 1999 addition of a steeple that replicated the original, part of a $2.4 million renovation project, which also included cleaning the Berea sandstone (which had turned black from air pollution) and conservation of the La Farge window. The Old Stone Church was added to the National Register of Historic Places in 1973.

== Clergy (1820–1920) ==
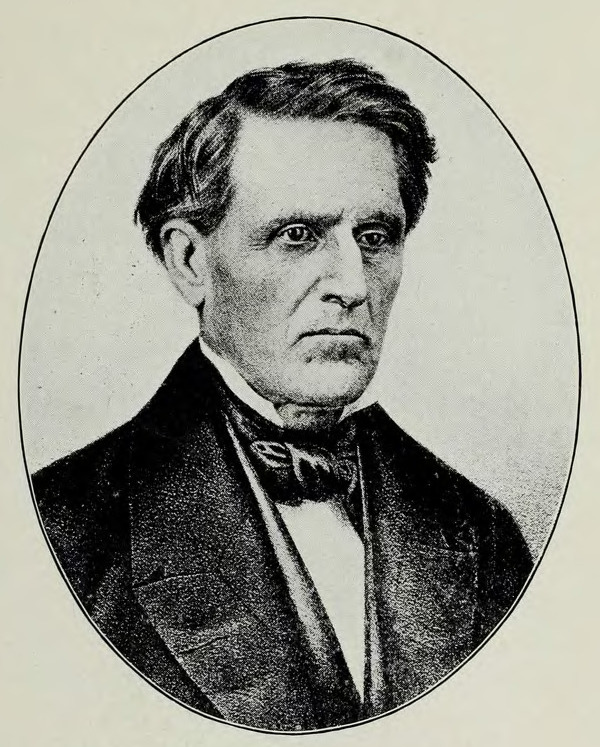
Samuel Clark Aiken, 1835-1861

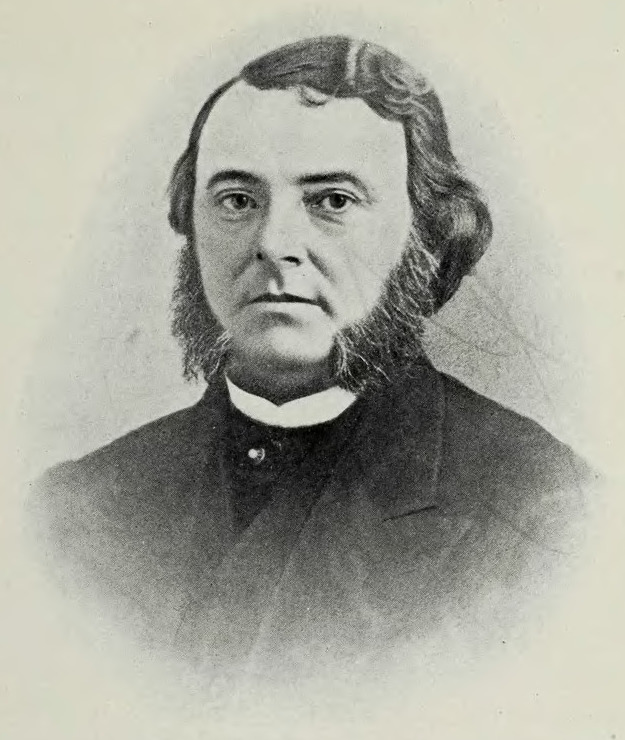
William Henry Goodrich, 1858-1874

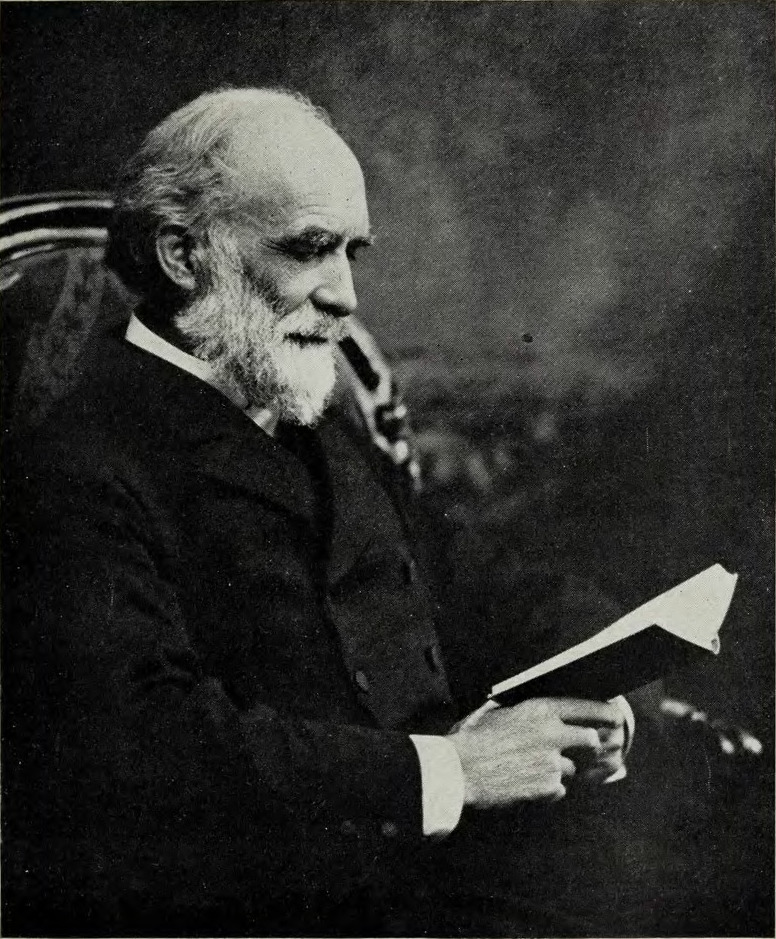
Hiram Collins Haydn, 1872-1880; 1884-1902

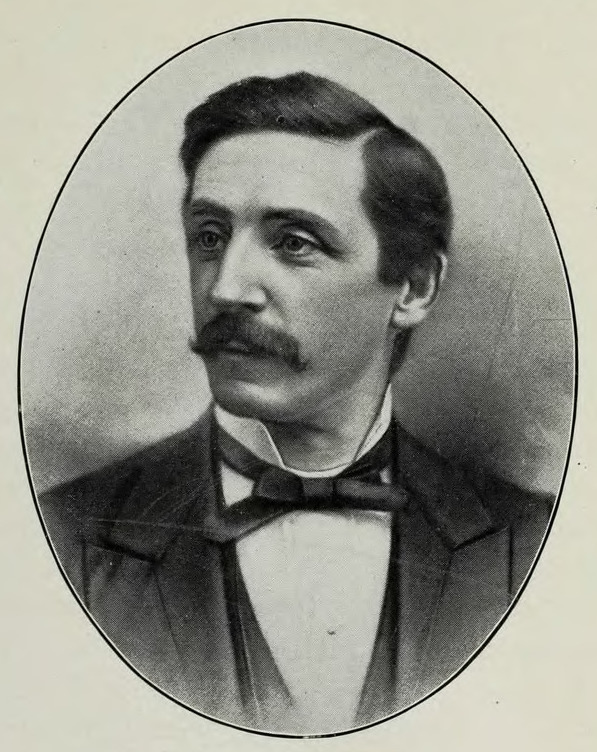
Arthur Mitchell, 1880-1884

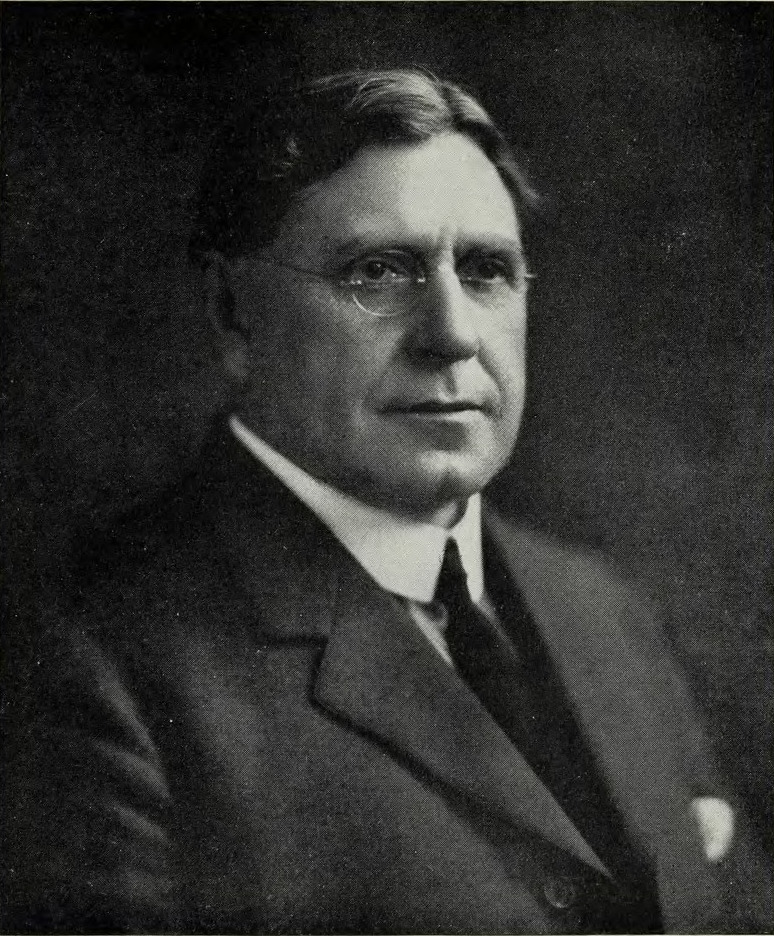
Andrew Barclay Meldrum
