= Henry E. Tremain =

American Civil War Medal of Honor recipient

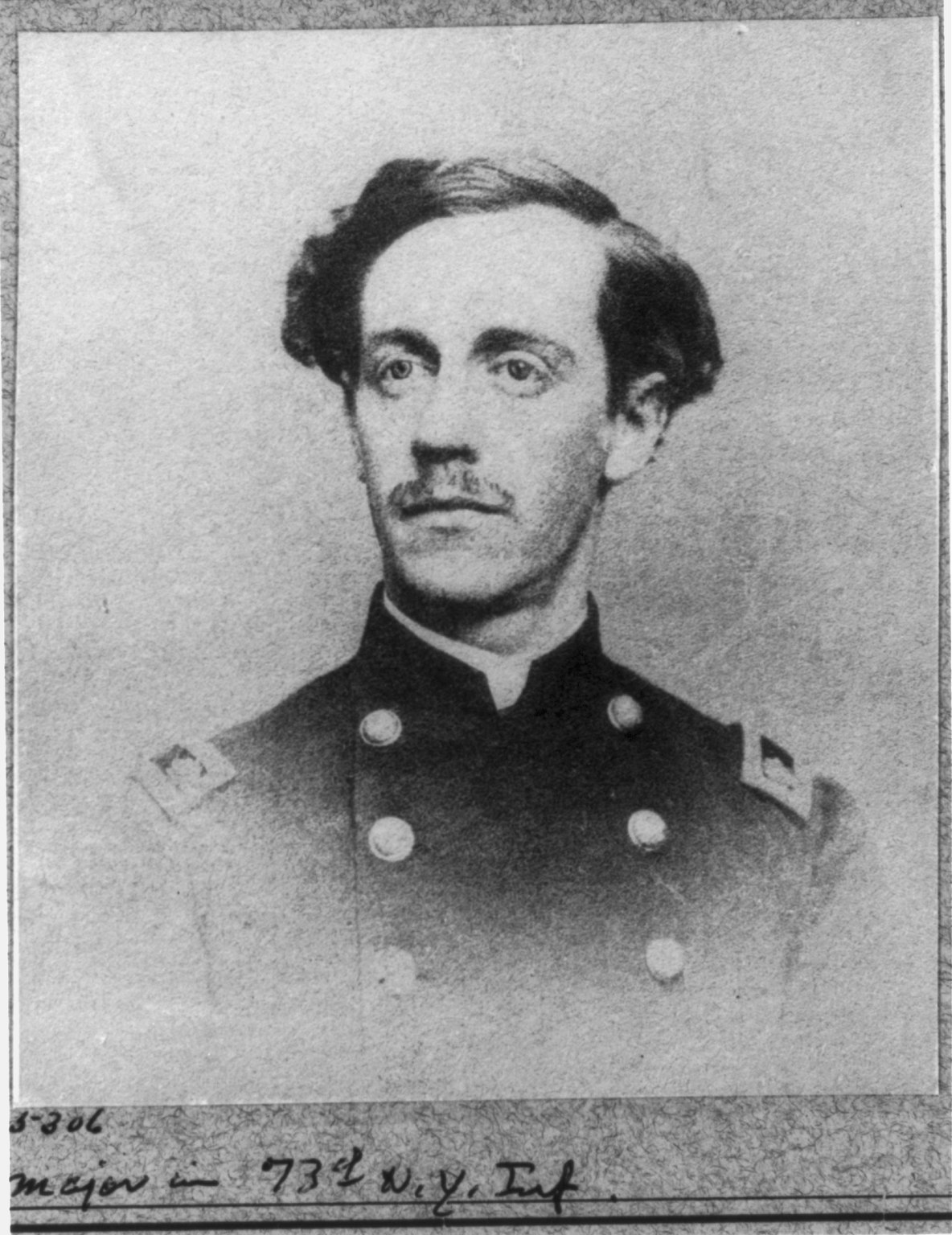
Henry Edwin Tremain

Henry Edwin Tremain (1840–1910) was an American Civil War Medal of Honor recipient who was on the staff of several generals. He received the Medal of Honor for his actions at the Battle of Resaca, when he voluntarily rode between two brigades of Union soldiers who were mistakenly firing at each other, and stopped the firing.

Following the war he worked as a lawyer and was the author of several works on the Civil War. He was born in New York City on November 14, 1840 and died there on December 9, 1910. He is buried at Woodlawn Cemetery in the Bronx, New York.

== Early years ==
Henry E. Tremain was born in New York City on November 14, 1840, to Edwin Ruthven Tremain and Mary Briggs Tremain. He graduated from the College of the City of New York in 1860, where he joined the Alpha Delta Phi fraternity. He began legal studies at Columbia College Law School in 1860.

== Military service ==
Tremain served as a volunteer throughout the Civil War. He retired with the brevet rank of brigadier general in April of 1866. He was present at numerous major battles and campaigns including Fredericksburg, Chancellorsville, Second Bull Run, Gettysburg, Chattanooga and Petersburg. In the latter half of the war he was an aide-de-camp with the United States Volunteers.

After enlisting as a private with the New York Seventh Regiment on April 17, 1861, he served three months. Along with his brother, Walter R. Tremain (who died of typhoid during the war), he recruited a company that joined the Second Regiment of Fire Zouaves (73rd NY Infantry) attached to the Excelsior Brigade. As a first lieutenant he was on the staff of General Nelson Taylor and General John Pope. Taken as a prisoner of war at the Second Battle of Bull Run on August 29, 1862, he was briefly held at Libby Prison in Richmond before being paroled at Aiken's Landing, Virginia on September 21, 1862.

Tremain was promoted to captain in November 1862, and mustered into the US Volunteers as a major and aide-de-camp in April 1863. He then served on the staff of Generals Daniel Sickles, Daniel Butterfield, David Gregg and George Crook. At the end of the war he was brevetted to lieutenant colonel, colonel, then brigadier general. After overseeing reconstruction activities in North and South Carolina, he retired from military service in April 1866.

== Medal of Honor citation ==
Tremain was awarded the Medal of Honor on June 30, 1892, for his actions at the Battle of Resaca on May 15, 1864. The citation reads:

The President of the United States of America, in the name of Congress, takes pleasure in presenting the Medal of Honor to Major & Aide-de-Camp Henry Edwin Tremain, United States Army, for extraordinary heroism on 15 May 1864, while serving with U.S. Volunteers, in action at Resaca, Georgia. Major Tremain voluntarily rode between the lines while two brigades of Union troops were firing into each other and stopped the firing.

== Postwar years ==
Returning to New York in 1866, Tremain completed his law studies at Columbia in 1867. In 1869 he formed a law firm, Tremain & Tyler, with fellow Union officer Col. Mason Whiting Tyler. The firm founded a publication called the Daily Law Journal. He worked as a lawyer until his death in 1910. He was politically active as a member of the Republican Party and the Grand Army of the Republic.

In 1869 he married Sarah Goodrich, who was born in Mississippi. In addition to a New York City residence, the couple maintained a home at Hillview in Bolton, New York on Lake George. The 1900 federal census shows that they employed nine resident servants, including a gardener, housekeeper, seamstress, coachman, cook and two farm laborers.

Tremain wrote several books that focused on the Civil War. They include The Last Hours of Sheridan's Cavalry and Two Days of War: a Gettysburg Narrative, and Other Excursions. In his will he bequeathed $5000 to his alma mater, the College of the City of New York, to endow an annual essay contest on the Civil War. The General Tremain Prize is still awarded at CCNY.

Henry Edwin Tremain died on December 9, 1910, in New York City. He is buried at Woodlawn Cemetery in the Bronx, New York.
