= Charles Edward Grinnell =

American clergyman, lawyer, and writer (1841–1916)

The Reverend Charles Edward Grinnell
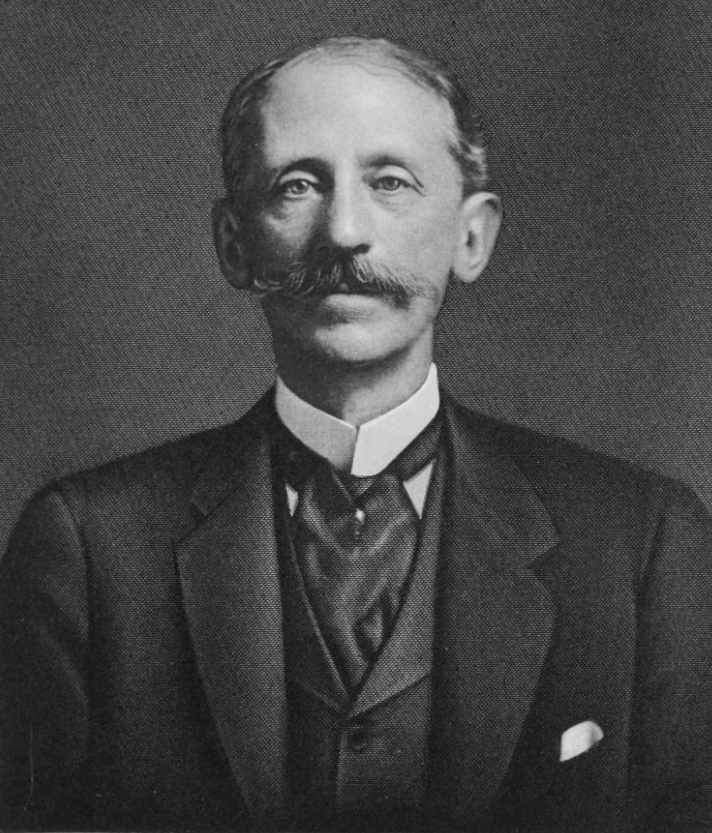
- Born: May 7, 1841; Baltimore, Maryland, U.S.
- Died: February 1, 1916 (aged 74); Boston, Massachusetts, U.S.
- Burial place: Nemasket Hill Cemetery
- Education: Harvard College, (1862); Yale and Harvard Divinity School, A.M. (1865); Harvard Law School, LL.B. (1876)
- Occupations: Clergyman, lawyer, and writer

4th Pastor of the Harvard Unitarian Church, Charlestown, Massachusetts
- In office November 10, 1869 – November 9, 1873
- Preceded by: George Edward Ellis
- Succeeded by: Pitt Dillingham

Charles Edward Grinnell (May 7, 1841 – February 1, 1916) was an American clergyman, lawyer, and writer.

== Biography ==
Grinnell was born May 7, 1841, in Baltimore, Maryland. He was the son of Charles Andrew Grinnell and Anna Almy Cobb. He entered the University of Maryland school of letters and sciences in 1854, then entered the boarding school of John Prentiss. He entered Harvard College in 1858 and graduated in 1862. At Harvard, Grinnell was a member of the Hasty Pudding Club, Alpha Delta Phi, and the A.D. Club. He then studied for three years at the Yale Divinity School and Harvard Divinity School, graduating in 1865. He then spent a year at the University of Göttingen studying theology.

Grinnell joined the Associate Reformed Church at the age of 17, but became a Unitarian minister. He was invited to become pastor at the First Unitarian Church in Lowell, Massachusetts where he was ordained February 19, 1867. On November 10, 1867, Grinnell became pastor at the Harvard Church of Charlestown, Massachusetts.

On January 4, 1871, he preached the election sermon before the governor and newly elected officers of the Commonwealth at the Old South Church in Boston. Grinnell was chaplain for the Fifth regiment Massachusetts Volunteer Militia from June 21, 1870, to May 8, 1872. He resigned from the Harvard Church in 1873, and retired from ministry altogether the following August.

Grinnell then moved to Cambridge, Massachusetts and entered the Harvard Law School and graduated with a Bachelor of Laws in 1876. Following graduation, he joined the office of Chandler, Ware, and Hudson. He was admitted to the Suffolk County bar in November 1876 and opened his own office in Boston shortly after, where he practiced until 1910. Grinnell moved to Boston in July 1878 with his family. He was editor of the American Law Review from 1880 until December 1882, and again from 1906 to 1909.

Grinnell was elected a member of the Century Association April 3, 1915. Proposed by Ehrman Syme Nadal and Arthur G. Sedgwick. He was also a member of the St. Botolph Club.

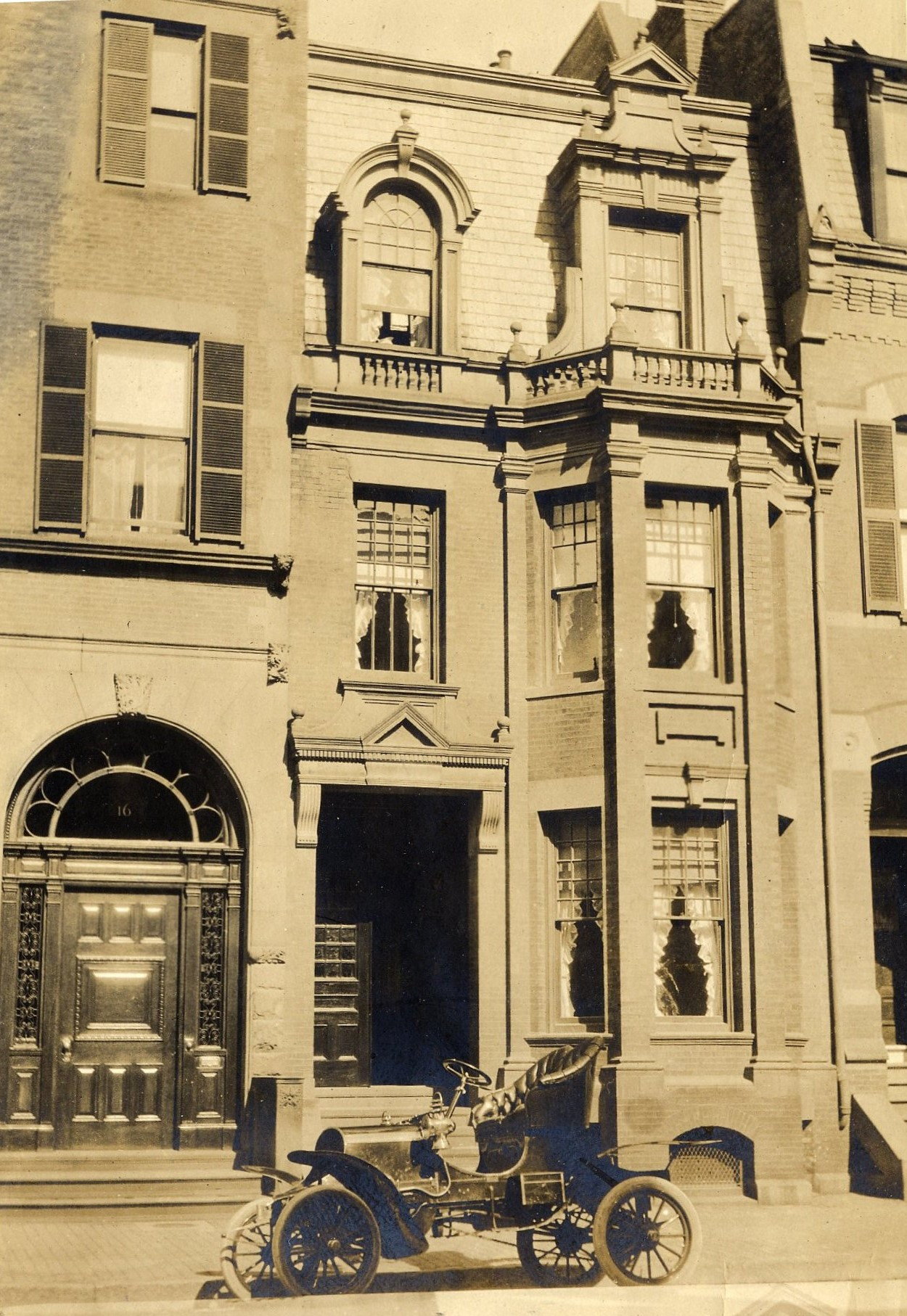
Grinnnell's residence at 18 Fairfield St., Boston. Designed by Peabody & Stearns

== Family and death ==
On July 11, 1865, Grinnell married Elizabeth Tucker Washburn. They had two sons, Charles Ewald Grinnell and Frank W. Grinnell. In 1909, Grinnell traveled with his wife to Paris and Italy, where she died in Naples. Following her death, he spent three years living in Paris and London while traveling in Germany, Russia, Egypt, the Holy Land, Greece, France, and Spain. He returned to Boston in 1913 where he lived with his son Charles. Grinnell died February 1, 1916, at his son's home in Boston and was buried at Nemasket Hill Cemetery in Middleborough, Massachusetts.

== Works ==
- The Modern Representations of the Life of Jesus (1868), written by Gerhard Uhlhorn, translated to English by Grinnell
- Fanaticism (1871)
- Of Miracles (1871)
- Points of Law for Lawyers and General Readers, Suggested by Guiteau's Case (1881)
- A Study of the Poor Debtor Law of Massachusetts and Some Details of Its Practice (1886)
- Subsequent Payments Under Resulting Trusts (1887)
- Points in Pleading and Practice Under the Massachusetts Practice Act (1889)
- Why Thomas Bram Was Found Guilty (1897)
- Beyond a Reasonable Doubt (1897)
- The Task of the Jury in the Case of Mrs. Maybrick (1900)
- Modern Murder Trials and Newspapers (1901)
- The Law of Deceit (1902)
- A Legal View of the Inquiry Granted Rear Admiral Schley and of Other Inquires by Military Courts (1902)
- The Red Robe (1910)
- The Pretended Failure of Christianity (1915)
