= William Henry Goodrich =

American clergyman

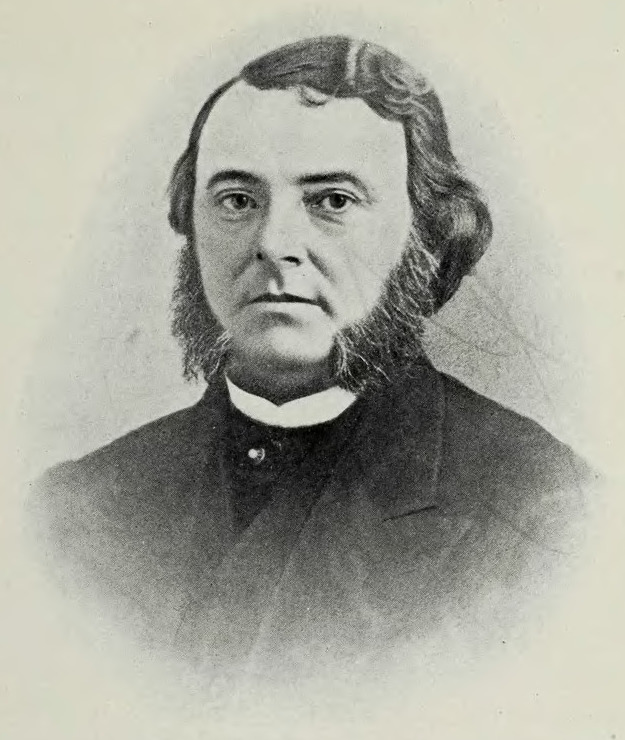
William H. Goodrich

William Henry Goodrich (January 19, 1823 – July 11, 1874) was a 19th-century American clergyman, the namesake of the Goodrich Social Settlement in Cleveland, Ohio. He served as pastor of First Church, Bristol, Connecticut (1850-54); Presbyterian Church, Binghamton, New York (1854-58); and First Presbyterian Church (Old Stone Church), Cleveland (1858-72). He served as president of Alpha Delta Phi.

== Early life and education ==
William Henry Goodrich was born in New Haven, Connecticut, January 19, 1823. He was a son of Rev. Chauncey A. Goodrich, D.D., a professor of rhetoric and oratory for 40 years in Yale College and in the Yale Divinity School. His grandfather, Elizur Goodrich, was a lawyer, a professor of law at Yale College, and served as a member of the United States House of Representatives. His great-grandfather was the Rev. Elizur Goodrich, D.D., an astronomer of ability, as well as an eminent clergyman and educator. His mother, Julia Webster Goodrich, was the daughter of Noah Webster, the lexicographer.

Goodrich's boyhood was spent on Temple Street, in New Haven, near his grandfather Webster's home, and in proximity to the homes of the Days, the Sillimans, the Hillhouses, the Whitneys, and the Bacons.

He graduated at Yale College, in 1843, served as Tutor in that institution for two years (1847-48), and then studied theology in the Yale Divinity School, 1846 gaining the degree of M.A. He was a member of Alpha Delta Phi. Goodrich then spent a year in foreign travel. In 1864, he received the D.D. degree from Western Reserve College.

== Career ==
He then became pastor in Bristol, Connecticut, and at the end of four years was called to the pastoral charge of the Presbyterian Church in the city of Binghamton, New York. In 1859, he became associate pastor, with Dr. Aiken, of the Old Stone Church of Cleveland (installed August 12, 1858). As Dr. Aiken soon afterwards became Pastor Emeritus, Goodrich became sole pastor in active service, in which position he continued, with two long interruptions, occasioned by illness, for fourteen years. As a preacher he was distinguished for culture, earnestness and spirituality. He was not much given to philosophical speculations and theorizing, but was eminently practical and impressive. His elocution was of a high order, and in preaching he commanded the close attention of all. Goodrich's love of flowers was a marked characteristic, the white chrysanthemum having long been his favorite, "Because," said he, "it blooms so bravely, even after the snow comes."

== Later life ==
After a ministry of twelve years in Cleveland, his health became seriously impaired. He left, in 1872, for a long vacation in Europe. Before leaving he had seen Dr. Hiram Collins Haydn installed to fill his place during his absence, and, as was expected, to be his associate pastor on his return. His expectations of restored health were not realized. He died on Saturday evening, July 11, 1874, in the city of Lausanne, Switzerland.

== Selected works ==
- Plea for increased means of education : a sermon, preached at Bristol, Conn., on the day of annual fast, 1852 (1852)
- A sermon on Christian morals in social life : preached in the Stone Church, March 13, 1859 (1859)
- A sermon, on the Christian necessity of war (1861)
- The church of God, the appointed support of divine truth : a sermon, preached at the installation of Rev. Joel F. Bingham, as pastor of the Westminster Congregation, Buffalo, November 13, 1861 (1862)
- A sermon delivered at the funeral of John Delamater, M.D., L.L.D. in the First Presbyterian church, Cleveland, April 2, 1867 (1867)
- Lessons brought from a mother's grave: a sermon of remembrance, preached at Cleveland, in the First Presbyterian church, August 29, 1869 (1869; 1870)
- Obeying right impulses : sermon (1872)
- The education of Divine Providence; a sermon preached in the Presbyterian Church, Massillon
- God's handiwork in the sea and the mountains : sermons preached after a summer vacation
