= Daniel Lambert =

English man known for his size (1770–1809)

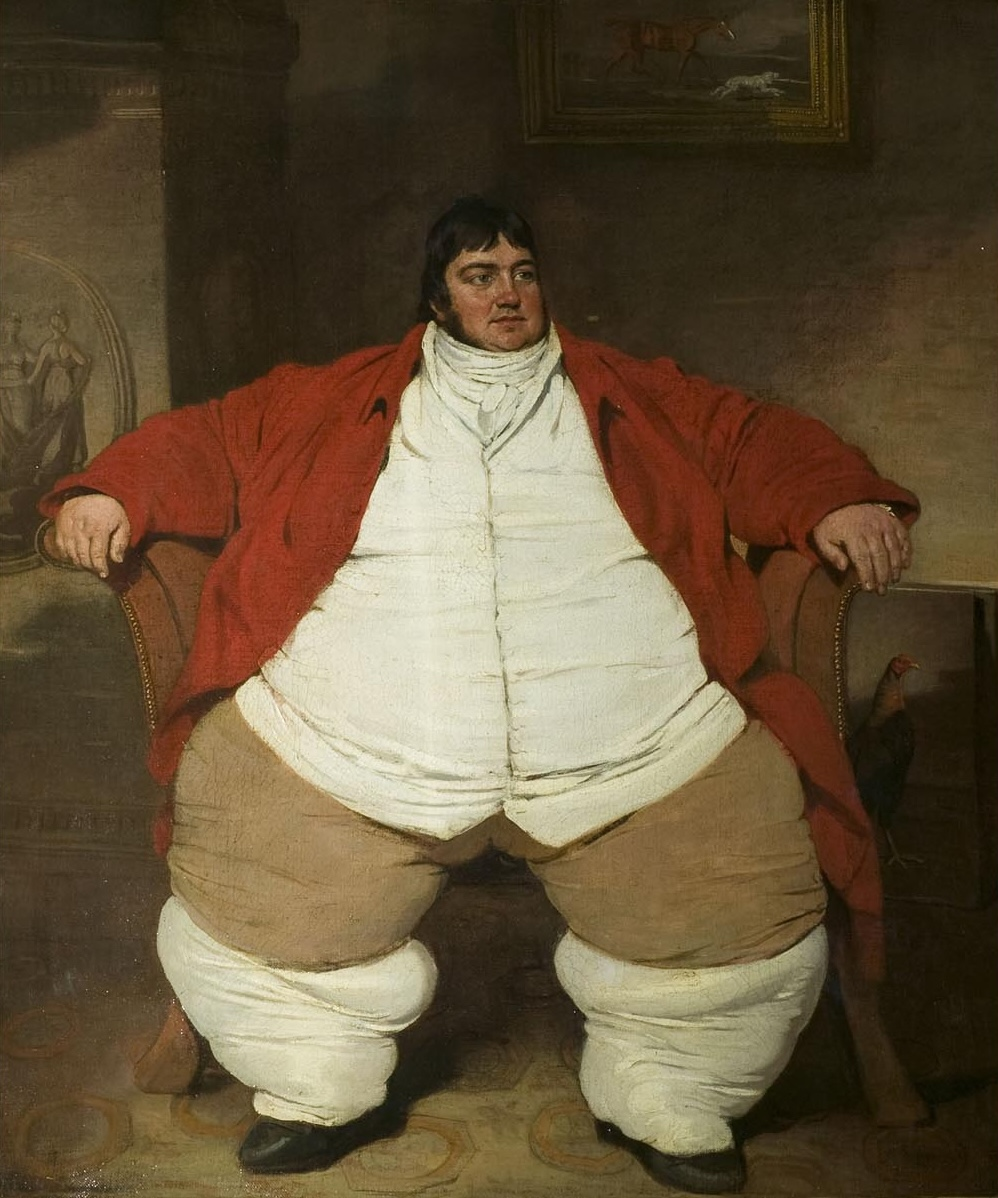
- Portrait c. 1806
- Born: 13 March 1770; Leicester, England
- Died: 21 June 1809 (aged 39); Stamford, Lincolnshire, England

Daniel Lambert (13 March 1770 – 21 June 1809) was an English gaol (Note: In this period, a gaol was a building used for holding suspects awaiting trial and recently convicted criminals awaiting transfer to prison, transportation or execution. The term was sometimes spelt "jail", but in official usage was always "gaol"; the institution of which Lambert was keeper was named the County Gaol.) keeper and animal breeder from Leicester, famous for his unusually large size. After serving four years as an apprentice at an engraving and die casting works in Birmingham, he returned to Leicester around 1788 and succeeded his father as keeper of Leicester's gaol. He was a keen sportsman and extremely strong; on one occasion he fought a bear in the streets of Leicester. He was an expert in sporting animals, widely respected for his expertise with dogs, horses and fighting cocks.

At the time of Lambert's return to Leicester, his weight began to increase steadily, even though he was athletically active and, by his own account, abstained from drinking alcohol and did not eat unusual amounts of food. In 1805, Lambert's gaol closed. By this time, he weighed 50 stone (700 lb; 320 kg), and had become the heaviest authenticated person up to that point in recorded history. Unemployable and sensitive about his size, Lambert became a recluse.

In 1806, poverty forced Lambert to put himself on exhibition to raise money. In April 1806, he took up residence in London, charging spectators to enter his apartments to meet him. Visitors were impressed by his intelligence and personality, and visiting him became highly fashionable. After some months on public display, Lambert grew tired of exhibiting himself, and in September 1806, he returned, wealthy, to Leicester, where he bred sporting dogs and regularly attended sporting events. Between 1806 and 1809, he made a further series of short fundraising tours.

In June 1809, he died suddenly in Stamford, Lincolnshire. At the time of his death, he weighed 52 stone 11 pounds (739 lb; 335 kg), and his coffin required 112 square feet (10.4 square metres) of wood. Despite the coffin being built with wheels to allow easy transport, and a sloping approach being dug to the grave, it took 20 men almost half an hour to drag his casket into the trench, in a newly opened burial ground to the rear of St Martin's Church. While others have since overtaken Daniel Lambert's record as the heaviest person in history, he remains a popular character in Leicester, and in 2009 was described by the Leicester Mercury as "one of the city's most cherished icons".

== Early life ==
Daniel Lambert was born at his parents' house in Blue Boar Lane, Leicester, on 13 March 1770. (Note: Blue Boar Lane is best known as the site of the Blue Boar, the coaching inn in which Richard III spent his last night on 21 August 1485 before his death at the Battle of Bosworth Field. A blue boar was the emblem of the 13th Earl of Oxford, who was aligned with Henry Tudor against Richard; it is thought that at the time of Richard's stay the inn was known as the Blue Bell.) His father, also named Daniel Lambert, had been the huntsman to Harry Grey, 4th Earl of Stamford, and at the time of his son's birth was the keeper of Leicester's gaol. The eldest of four children, Daniel Lambert had two sisters, and a brother who died young.

At the age of eight he was a keen swimmer, and for much of his life he taught local children to swim. Lambert's paternal uncle—like his father—also worked with animals, but as a professional gamekeeper; his maternal grandfather was a breeder of champion fighting cocks. Lambert grew up with a strong interest in field sports, and was particularly fond of otter hunting, fishing, shooting and horse racing. From his early teens, Lambert was a keen sportsman and by his late teens he was considered an expert in the breeding of hunting dogs.

In 1784, he was apprenticed to Messrs Taylor & Co, an engraving and die casting works in Birmingham owned by a Mr Benjamin Patrick. The engraved buckles and buttons in which Patrick's factory specialised became unfashionable, however, and the business went into decline. In 1788, Lambert returned to Leicester, to serve as his father's assistant at the gaol (some sources date Lambert's return to Leicester to 1791, following the destruction of the building housing Messrs Taylor & Co in the Priestley Riots of July 1791). His father retired soon afterwards and Lambert succeeded him as gaol keeper. The younger Daniel Lambert was a much-respected gaoler; he befriended many of the prisoners, and made every effort to help them when they went to trial. (Note: "Whatever severity he might be under the necessity of exercising towards the unhappy objects committed to his care during their confinement, he never forbore to make the greatest exertions to assist them, at the time of their trials. Few left the prison without testifying their gratitude, and tears often bespoke the sincerity of the feelings they expressed.")

== Weight ==
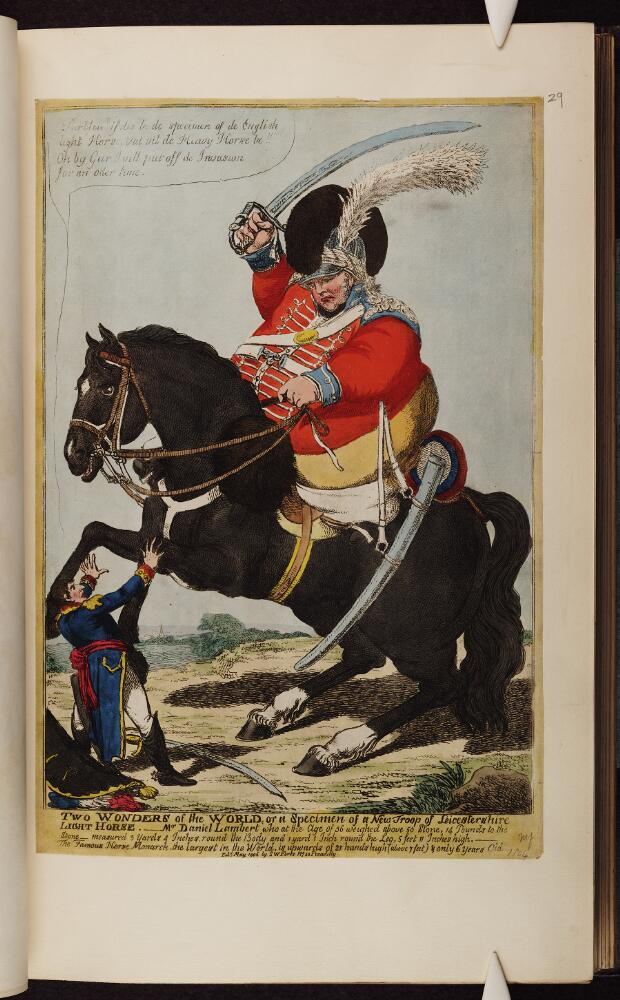
Cartoon of Lambert of May 1806, "Two wonders of the world, or a specimen of a new troop of Leicestershire Light Horse"

Although by his own account Lambert did not eat unusually large amounts of food, at about the time of his return to Leicester his weight began to increase steadily, and by 1793, he weighed 32 stone (450 lb; 200 kg). Concerned for his fitness, in his spare time he devoted himself to exercise, building his strength to the point where he was able to easily carry five long hundredweight (560 lb; 250 kg). On one occasion, while he was watching a dancing bear on display in Blue Boar Lane, his dog slipped loose and bit it. The bear knocked the dog to the ground, and Lambert asked its keeper to restrain it so he could retrieve his wounded animal, but the keeper removed the bear's muzzle so it could attack the dog. Lambert reportedly struck the bear with a pole and with his left hand, punched its head, knocking it to the ground to allow the dog to escape. (Note: While Daniel Lambert having fought a bear is not disputed, the account of Lambert's victory in the fight may not be accurate. Some sources say that the bear was victorious and Lambert only narrowly escaped with his life. For a full account of Lambert's fight with the bear, published during Lambert's lifetime and with his approval, see Wilson 1806, pp. 6–8.)

Despite his increasingly large girth, Lambert remained fit and active, once walking 7 miles (11 km) from Woolwich to the City of London "with much less apparent fatigue than several middle-sized men who were of the party". Although not particularly agile, he was not significantly restricted by the size of his body, and was able to stand on one leg and kick the other to a height of 7 feet (2.1 m). He continued to teach swimming in Leicester, and was able to stay afloat with two grown men sitting on his back. He disliked changing his clothes, and each morning habitually wore the clothes he had worn the day before, regardless of whether they were still wet; by Lambert's own account he suffered no colds or other ill effects from this behaviour.

By 1801, Lambert's weight had increased to about 40 stone (560 lb; 250 kg), and, as his bulk meant neither he nor his horse were able to keep up with the hunt, he was forced to give up hunting. He continued to maintain an interest in field sports, keeping a pack of 30 terriers. By this time, although he retained his solid reputation as a gaoler, serious concerns were being raised about his fitness for the post. Traditional gaols were falling out of favour and being replaced with forced labour institutions, and in 1805, the old Bridewell gaol was closed. Lambert was left without a job, but was granted an annuity of £50 (about £3,700 as of 2025) a year by the Leicester magistrates, in recognition of his excellent service as gaol keeper.

== Unemployment ==
Lambert's girth was then enormous; six men of normal size could fit together inside his waistcoat, and each of his stockings was the size of a sack. His £50 annuity did not adequately cover his living costs, and his size prevented him from working. He became a virtual recluse. Stories of his bulk had by then begun to spread, and travellers visiting Leicester would use various pretexts to visit his home. One such visitor asked Lambert's servant to allow him entry as he wished to ask Lambert's advice about fighting cocks; Lambert leaned out of the window and told the servant to "tell the gentleman that I am a shy cock". On another occasion, he admitted into his house a Nottingham man who sought his advice about a mare's pedigree; on realising the man was visiting only to look at him, Lambert told him that the horse in question was "by Impertinence out of Curiosity".

Sensitive about his weight, Daniel Lambert refused to allow himself to be weighed, but sometime around 1805, some friends persuaded him to come with them to a cock fight in Loughborough. Once he had squeezed his way into their carriage, the rest of the party drove the carriage onto a large scale and jumped out. After deducting the weight of the (previously weighed) empty carriage, they calculated that Lambert's weight was now 50 stone (700 lb; 320 kg), and that he had thus overtaken Edward Bright, the 616-pound (279 kg) "Fat Man of Maldon", as the heaviest authenticated person in recorded history.

== London ==
EXHIBITION.—Mr. DANIEL LAMBERT, of Leicester, the greatest Curiosity in the World, who, at the age of 36, weighs upwards of FIFTY STONE (14lb. to the stone). Mr. Lambert will see Company at his House, No.53, Piccadilly, opposite St. James's Church, from 12 to 5 o'clock.—Admittance 1s.

— Advertisement in The Times, 2 April 1806

Despite his shyness, Lambert badly needed to earn money, and saw no alternative to putting himself on display, and charging his spectators. On 4 April 1806, he boarded a specially built carriage and travelled from Leicester to his new home at 53 Piccadilly, then near the western edge of London. For five hours each day, he welcomed visitors into his home, charging each a shilling (about £3.88 as of 2025).

Lambert shared his interests and knowledge of sports, dogs and animal husbandry with London's middle and upper classes, and it soon became highly fashionable to visit him, or become his friend. Many called repeatedly; one banker made 20 visits, paying the admission fee on each occasion. During this period of English history no real stigma was attached to obesity, and Lambert was generally considered a wonder to be marvelled at, rather than a freak to be gawped or sneered at. His business venture was immediately successful, drawing around 400 paying visitors per day. His home was described as having the air of a fashionable resort, rather than that of an exhibition, and he was pleased to find that his customers generally treated him with courtesy, and not simply as a spectacle. He insisted on maintaining amongst his visitors an atmosphere of civility and all men entering his rooms were obliged to remove their hats. One visitor refused to remove his "even if the King were present" but Lambert replied that "Then by G——, Sir, you must instantly quit this room, as I do not consider it a mark of respect due to myself, but to the ladies and gentlemen who honour me with their company."

Lambert's popularity inspired an imitator in "Master Wybrants, Mr. Lambert in miniature", exhibited a short distance away in Sackville Street. A handbill described Wybrants as "Master Wybrants the Modern Hercules, who at the age of 4 Months weighed 39 pounds, measured 2 feet round the Body 15 Inches round the thigh and 8 Inches round the Arm, to be seen at the corner of Sackville Street Piccadilly".

People would travel long distances to see him (on one occasion, a party of 14 travelled to London from Guernsey), (Note: "He was one day visited by a party of fourteen, eight ladies and six gentlemen, who expressed their joy at not being too late, as it was near the time of closing the door for the day. They assured him that they had come from Guernsey on purpose to convince themselves of the existence of such a prodigy as Mr. Lambert had been described to be by one of their neighbours, who had seen him; adding, that they had not even one single friend or acquaintance in London, so that they had no other motive whatever for their voyage.—A striking illustration of the power of curiosity over the human mind.") and many would spend hours speaking with him on animal breeding. A life-sized waxwork of Lambert was displayed in London, where it became extremely popular. Daniel Lambert soon became a popular subject with cartoonists, who often depicted him as John Bull. He mixed well with the upper classes, and on one occasion met King George III. The King's and Lambert's reactions to this meeting are not recorded.

== Medical examination ==
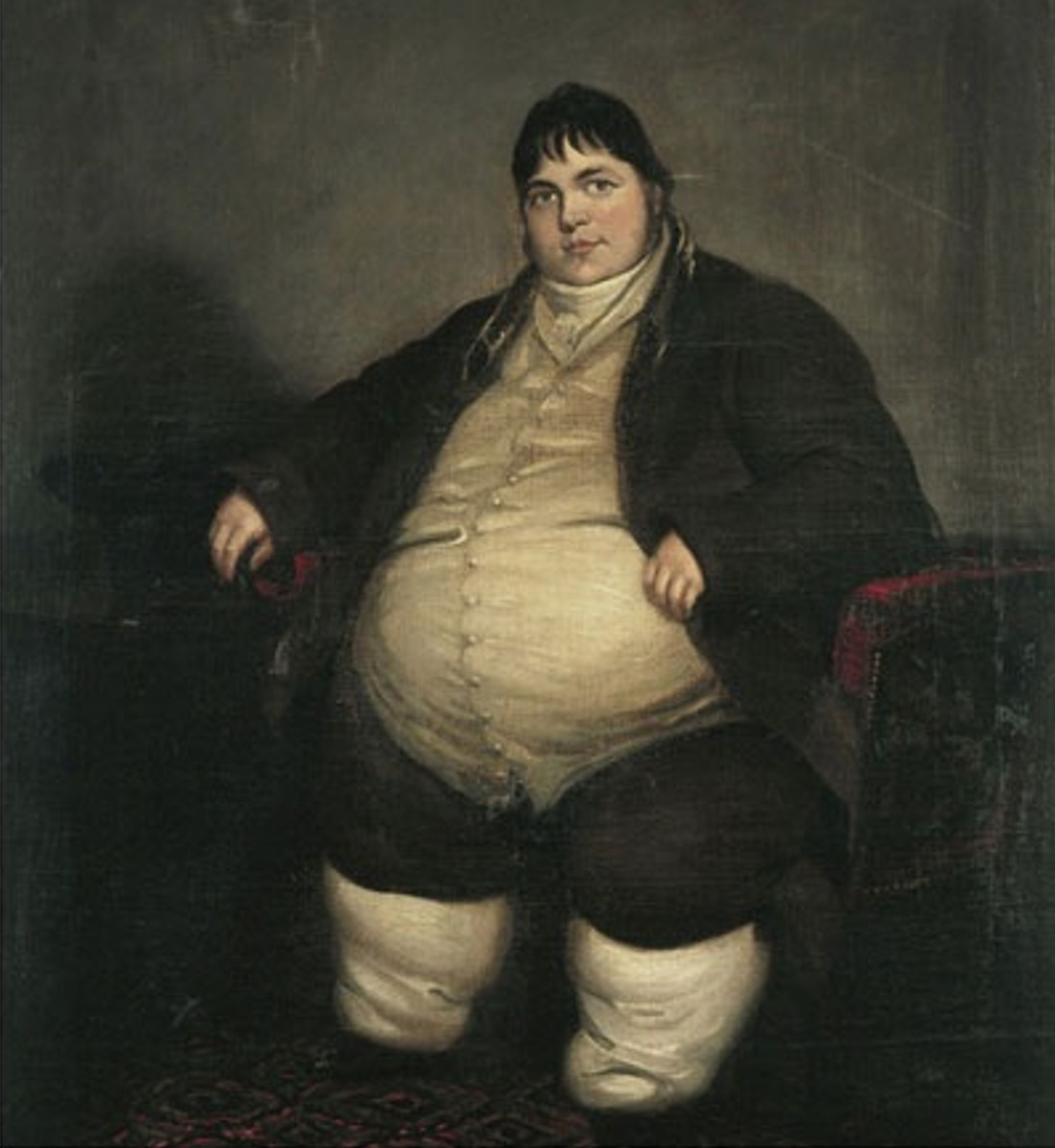
Daniel Lambert during his first exhibition in London

Lambert soon came to the attention of the medical profession, and shortly after his arrival in London, the Medical and Physical Journal published an article about him. They confirmed that he weighed 50 stone (700 lb; 320 kg), and measured his height as 5 feet 11 inches (1.80 m). A thorough medical examination found that his bodily functions worked correctly, and that he breathed freely. Lambert was described as active and mentally alert, well-read, and with an excellent memory. He was fond of singing, and had a normal speaking voice which showed no signs of pressure on the lungs. Doctors found tumefaction of his feet, legs and thighs, and accumulation of fat within the abdomen, but other than scaly and thickened skin on his legs caused by previous attacks of erysipelas, he had no health problems. Lambert told the doctors that he ate normal quantities of ordinary food. He claimed that since about 1795 he had drunk nothing but water, and that even while young, and a regular party-goer, he did not join his fellow revellers in drinking. Lambert claimed that he was able to walk about a quarter of a mile (400 m) without difficulty. He slept regularly for no more than eight hours per night, always with his window open, and was never heard to snore; on waking he was always fully alert within five minutes, and he never napped during the day.

=== Possible causes ===
It is impossible to be certain about what caused Daniel Lambert's extreme weight, but it is considered unlikely to have been caused by an endocrine (glandular) or genetic disorder. Other than his weight gain, he showed no symptoms of a thyroid disorder, and none of his many portraits show the moon face of a patient with Cushing's syndrome. Patients with Bardet–Biedl syndrome and Prader–Willi syndrome, genetic syndromes which can lead to obesity in patients, also have learning disabilities and muscular weakness, but all those who knew Lambert agreed that he was highly intelligent, was extremely strong physically, and, except for erysipelas and venous insufficiency (varicose veins) in his legs, did not have any health problems. One contemporary commentator remarked that "Mr. Lambert scarcely knows what it is to be ailing or indisposed". Lambert's only recorded psychological problem was an occasional "depression of the spirits", during his time in London. Although he had an aunt and uncle who were overweight, his parents and surviving siblings remained of normal build throughout their lives.

Consequently, it is likely that Lambert's weight gain was caused not by a physical disorder but by a combination of overeating and a lack of exercise. Although heavily built in his teens, he began to gain weight only when he took up the relatively sedentary job of prison keeper. A biography of Lambert published during his lifetime recounted that "it was within a year of this appointment that his bulk received the greatest and most rapid encrease". Although he claimed to eat little, and to abstain from alcohol, it is likely that a man with his lifestyle and position in society would have eaten large amounts of meat, and drunk beer at social events.

== Józef Boruwłaski ==
After some months in London, Lambert was visited by Józef Boruwłaski, a 3-foot-3-inch (99 cm) dwarf then in his seventies. Born in 1739 to a poor family in rural Pokuttya, Boruwłaski was generally considered to be the last of Europe's court dwarfs. He was introduced to the Empress Maria Theresa in 1754, and after a short time residing with deposed Polish king Stanisław Leszczyński, he exhibited himself around Europe, thus becoming a wealthy man. At age 60, he retired to Durham, where he became such a popular figure that the City of Durham paid him to live there and he became one of its most prominent citizens. (Note: Boruwłaski was a popular figure in Durham, and is buried in Durham Cathedral.) Boruwłaski had a superb memory, and recalled that Lambert, while still employed by Patrick's die casting works and before he grew fat, had paid to see him in Birmingham. Boruwłaski remarked "I have seen this face twenty years before at Birmingham, but certainly it be another body". He had been told that Lambert's bulk was a hoax, and he therefore felt his leg to prove to himself that it was not. The two men compared their respective outfits, and calculated that one of Lambert's sleeves would provide enough cloth to make an entire coat for Boruwłaski. Lambert enquired after Boruwłaski's wife, Isalina Barbutan, whereupon the latter replied "No, she is dead, and I am not very sorry, for when I affront her, she put me on the mantle-shelf for punishment."

The meeting of Lambert and Boruwłaski, the largest and smallest men in the country, was the subject of enormous public interest; one newspaper reported that "It was Sir John Falstaff and Tom Thumb, which must have afforded a double treat to the curious". Boruwłaski lived to see his 98th year, despite the prediction of the money-lender who sold him his annuity that his small stature would make him prone to illness.

== Disillusionment ==
The half-courteous, half-sullen manner in which this "gross fat man" received the majority of his visitors met the humour of my husband, and he liked as well as pitied him; for it was distressing sometimes to hear the coarse observations made by unfeeling people, and the silly unthinking questions asked by many of them about his appetite, &c.

— Anne Mathews (née Jackson), widow of Charles Mathews, on Mathews' relationship with Lambert

Although generally respected by London society, the longer Lambert remained there, the more irritable he became. Shy and self-conscious, he was annoyed at repeatedly being asked about the size of his clothes. In answer to one request, to a woman who enquired as to the cost of his coat, he replied "I cannot pretend to charge my memory with the price, but I can put you into a method of obtaining the information you want. If you think proper to make me a present of a new coat, you will then know exactly what it costs". Another interested spectator claimed that since his entrance fee was paying for Lambert's clothing, he had the right to know about it; Lambert replied "Sir, if I knew what part of my next coat your shilling would pay for, I can assure you I would cut out the piece". Lambert calculated in 1806 that a full suit of clothes cost him £20, about £1,600 as of 2025.

== Return to Leicester ==
Lambert had the acumen to refuse the management offers of various impresarios and agents, and by September 1806, he had returned to Leicester as a wealthy man. He returned to his favourite pastimes, breeding sporting dogs and fighting cocks. A terrier bitch, for which he was offered 100 guineas (about £8,100 as of 2025), was said to be the finest in England. He refused to sell the dog, which became his lifetime companion. He began again to attend sporting events, as a report on the Leicester Races of September 1806 noted that "Among the distinguished characters upon the turf we were glad to see our old friend, Mr. Daniel Lambert, in apparent high health and spirits". Although too heavy to follow hunts on horseback, he used a portion of the money earned in London to build up a pack of greyhounds, watching from his carriage as they coursed hares in the Leicestershire countryside.

In December 1806, Lambert went on a brief fundraising tour, and exhibited himself in Birmingham and Coventry. Early the next year he returned to London, and stayed in the fashionable Leicester Square. There he fell ill; his physician Dr Heaviside felt that his illness might have been caused by the polluted London air, and Lambert returned to Leicester. He recovered, and later in 1807, made a series of tours of England.

This enormously fat man sat in a sofa wide enough for three or four people, and filled it well. He had a really quite handsome, small head, at least compared with his ungainly body. Had he been able to stand up, a feat that really must have been impossible for him to perform, he would have been quite a tall man. His wide cheekbones and huge double chin did not disfigure him very much, but his belly, dressed in a striped waistcoat, resembled a huge featherbed, and his legs, dressed in similarly coloured stockings, were the size of two large butter kernels.

— Johan Didrik af Wingård, Governor of Värmland County (1814–1840) and Swedish Minister for Finance (1840–1842), on an 1808 meeting with Lambert.

In summer 1808, Lambert briefly returned to the capital, where he sold a pair of spaniels for 75 guineas (about £6,000 as of 2025) at Tattersalls. Later that year, he exhibited himself in York. In June 1809, he set off on another tour of East Anglia, to conclude in Stamford during the Stamford Races. One account suggests that this tour was intended to be his last, as he was then sufficiently wealthy to retire. While on the tour, Lambert was weighed in Ipswich; his weight was 52 stone 11 pounds (739 lb; 335 kg). No longer able to use stairs, he took lodgings on the ground floor of the Waggon & Horses inn at 47 High Street, Stamford on 20 June.

== Death ==
Following his arrival at Stamford, Lambert sent a message to the Stamford Mercury, ordering advertisements and handbills. Stating that "as the mountain could not wait upon Mahomet, Mahomet would go to the mountain", he asked the printer to visit him at the Waggon & Horses, to discuss his printing requirements. That evening, Lambert was in bed and admitted to feeling tired, but nonetheless he was able to discuss his requirements with the printer, and was anxious that the handbills be delivered on time.

On the morning of 21 June, Lambert woke at his usual time and appeared in good health. As he began to shave, he complained of breathing difficulties. Ten minutes later, he collapsed and died.

There was no autopsy, and the cause of Lambert's death is unknown. While many sources say that he died of a fatty degeneration of the heart or of stress on his heart caused by his size and weight, his behaviour in the period leading to his death does not match that of someone with cardiac insufficiency; witnesses agree that on the morning of his death he appeared well, before he became short of breath and collapsed. Bondeson (2006) speculates that the most consistent explanation of his death, given his symptoms and medical history, is that he had a sudden pulmonary embolism.

== Burial ==
Lambert's corpse rapidly began to putrefy. There was no question of his body being returned to Leicester, and so on 22 June, it was placed inside an elm coffin, 6 feet 4 inches long, 4 feet 4 inches wide and 2 feet 4 inches deep (193 cm × 132 cm × 71 cm), built on wheels to allow it to be moved. The coffin was so large that to wheel it out of the inn and to the newly opened burial ground at the rear of St Martin's Church, the window and wall of his apartment were demolished. A suitably sized grave had been dug, with a sloping approach to avoid the need to lower the coffin from above, but on 23 June, it nonetheless took almost half an hour for twenty men to pull Lambert's enormous coffin into the grave.

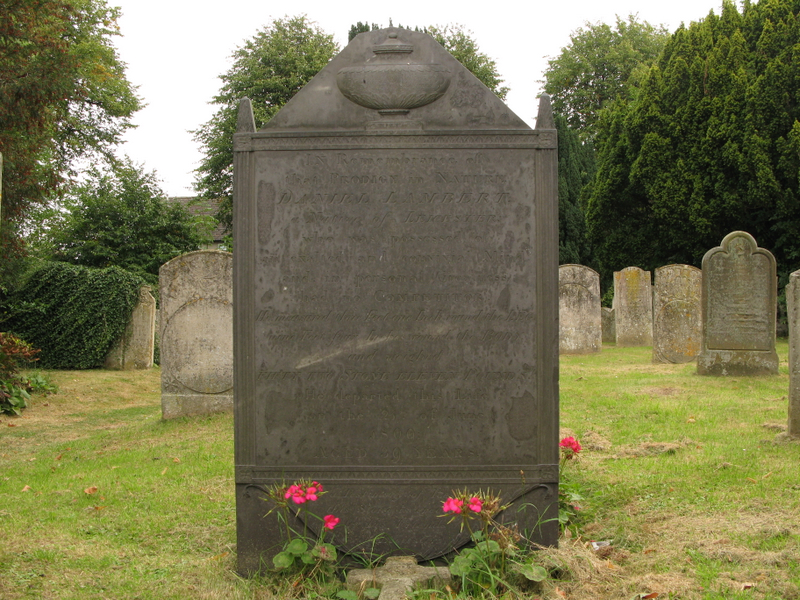
Daniel Lambert's grave

Lambert's friends paid for a large gravestone, inscribed:

In Remembrance of that Prodigy in Nature.
DANIEL LAMBERT.
a Native of Leicester:
who was possessed of an exalted and convivial Mind
and in personal Greatness had no Competitor
He measured three Feet one Inch round the Leg
nine Feet four Inches round the Body
and weighed
Fifty two Stone eleven Pounds!
He departed this Life on the 21st of June 1809
Aged 39 years
As a Testimony of Respect this Stone is erected by his Friends in Leicester

== After death ==
In late 1809, John Drakard released The life of that wonderful and extraordinary heavy man, the late Danl. Lambert, from his birth to the moment of his dissolution, with an account of men noted for their corpulency, and other interesting matter, the first full biography of Lambert to be released after his death. Lambert's position as the heaviest person in recorded history was soon overtaken by the American Mills Darden (1799–1857), but Lambert had by now become a cult figure, and virtually every item connected with him was preserved for posterity. His clothes and possessions were sold at auction to collectors, and many of them are preserved in museums today.

Across England, many public houses and inns were renamed after Daniel Lambert, particularly in Leicester and Stamford. The Daniel Lambert public house at 12 Ludgate Hill, near the entrance to St Paul's Cathedral in London, was well known, and had a large portrait of Daniel Lambert and Lambert's walking stick on display in the lobby. James Dixon, owner of the Ram Jam Inn in Stamford, bought the suit of clothes Lambert had been wearing when he died and put it on display, renaming the inn the Daniel Lambert.

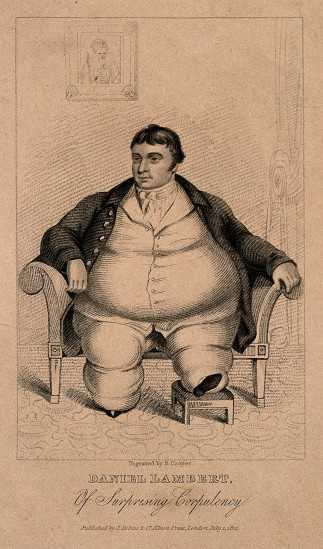
Print of "Daniel Lambert, of surprising corpulency", published in 1821

The term "Daniel Lambert" entered common use in English speech and writing, to refer to any fat man. His name continued in this use long after the details of his life had been largely forgotten; in 1852, Charles Dickens remarked that "Lambert's name is known better than his history". Dickens's Nicholas Nickleby compares the obese George IV to Lambert, and William Makepeace Thackeray used the term in Vanity Fair to refer to the obese Joseph Sedley, (Note: 'Jos, that fat gourmand, drank up the whole contents of the bowl; and the consequence of his drinking up the whole contents of the bowl was, a liveliness which at first was astonishing, and then became almost painful; for he talked and laughed so loud as to bring scores of listeners round the box, much to the confusion of the innocent party within it; and, volunteering to sing a song (which he did in that maudlin high key peculiar to gentlemen in an inebriated state), he almost drew away the audience who were gathered round the musicians in the gilt scollop-shell, and received from his hearers a great deal of applause. "Brayvo, Fat un!" said one; "Angcore, Daniel Lambert!" said another; "What a figure for the tight-rope!" exclaimed another wag, to the inexpressible alarm of the ladies, and the great anger of Mr Osborne.') and in The Luck of Barry Lyndon to refer to the fat servant Tim. As time progressed, "Daniel Lambert" came to mean anything exceptionally large; Herbert Spencer's The Study of Sociology used the phrase "a Daniel Lambert of learning", (Note: "When facts are not organised into faculty, the greater the mass of them the more will the mind stagger along under its burden, hampered instead of helped by its acquisitions. A student may become a very Daniel Lambert of learning, and remain utterly useless to himself and all others.") while Thomas Carlyle referred sarcastically to Oliver Cromwell as "this big swollen Gambler and gluttonous hapless 'spiritual Daniel Lambert'". In 1874, The Times, in reviewing the newly translated French comedy La Fiammina by Mario Uchard in which a character is named "Daniel Lambert", noted that the name is "always associated in the English mind with the notion of obesity", and in 1907, almost 100 years after Lambert's death, the Château de Chambord was referred to as "the Daniel Lambert among châteaux". Nellie Lambert Ensall, at the time the heaviest woman in Britain, claimed in 1910 to be Daniel Lambert's great-granddaughter, but her claim is likely to be untrue; Lambert was unmarried and is unlikely to have had any children.

In 1838, the English Annual published a series of poems, purportedly written by Lambert and found amongst his papers at the Waggon and Horses after his death. No source published during Lambert's lifetime mentions his having any interest in poetry or in any reading matter other than periodicals on field sports, and it is unclear why his papers should have been with him in Stamford at his death, rather than at his home in Leicester. The discoverer of the poems is credited only as "Omega". It is likely that the poems are a hoax.

=== P. T. Barnum and General Tom Thumb ===
P. T. Barnum and the 40-inch (100 cm) tall General Tom Thumb (Charles Sherwood Stratton) visited Stamford in 1846 and donated one of Thumb's costumes to Dixon to be displayed alongside Lambert's. General Tom Thumb visited Stamford again in 1859 and was tied up inside one of Lambert's stockings. In 1866, General Tom Thumb, with his equally short wife Lavinia Warren (Mercy Lavinia Warren Bump), her sister Minnie Warren (Huldah Pierce Warren Bump) and Barnum's other celebrated dwarf Commodore Nutt (George Washington Morrison Nutt) visited Stamford. All four were able to pass through the knee of Lambert's breeches together. In 1866, Lambert's and Tom Thumb's clothes were sold to the Old London Tavern in Stamford; they were later in the possession of Stamford Museum. (In June 2010, it was announced that the Stamford Museum would close in June 2011, with its collection transferred to Stamford Library.)

The 1806 waxwork of Lambert was exported to the United States and was on show in New Haven, Connecticut, by 1813. By 1828, the effigy was displayed in the Boston Vauxhall Gardens dressed in a complete set of Lambert's clothes. It was later bought by P. T. Barnum and displayed at Barnum's American Museum in New York, but the museum was destroyed by fire in 1865 and, although workmen endeavoured to save the waxwork, it melted in the heat and was destroyed.

=== In popular memory ===
Lambert is still a popular character in Leicester, described in 2009 by the Leicester Mercury as "one of the city's most cherished icons"; several local public houses and businesses are named after him. Sue Townsend's play The Ghost of Daniel Lambert featuring Leicester actor Perry Cree, tells the story of how Lambert's ghost watches disapprovingly over the 1960s demolition and redevelopment of Leicester's historic town centre, premiered at Leicester's Haymarket Theatre in 1981. Lambert is also a popular figure in Stamford, and local football team Stamford A.F.C. are nicknamed "The Daniels", after him.

A set of Lambert's clothes, together with his armchair, walking stick, riding crop and prayer book, are on permanent display at the Newarke Houses Museum in Leicester. Stamford Museum exhibited a tailor's dummy, dressed with Daniel Lambert's clothes as if they are being made up for him, plus his hat and a portrait. The Daniel Lambert pub in Ludgate Hill no longer exists, and the memorabilia formerly displayed there are now on permanent display at the George Hotel in Stamford. The Daniel Lambert pub in Stamford has also closed.

In 2009, on the 200th anniversary of his death, Leicester celebrated Daniel Lambert Day, and over 800 people attended an event in his name at Newarke Houses Museum.

== See also ==
- William Ball (Shropshire Giant)

== Notes and references ==
=== Bibliography ===
- Altick, Richard D. (1978), The Shows of London, Boston: Harvard University Press, p. 254, ISBN 0-674-80731-6
- Bondeson, Jan (2006), Freaks: The Pig-Faced Lady of Manchester Square & Other Medical Marvels, Stroud: Tempus Publishing, ISBN 0-7524-3662-7
- Carlyle, Thomas (1858), Latter-day Pamphlets, London: Chapman and Hall
- Dickens, Charles (21 August 1852), "A Great Idea", Household Words, 5 (126), London
- Dickens, Charles (19 November 1864), "Fat People", All the Year Round, 12 (291), London: Charles Dickens
- Gilman, Sander L. (2010), Obesity: The Biography, Oxford: Oxford University Press, ISBN 978-0-19-955797-4
- Leroi, Armand Marie (2003), Mutants, London: Harper Perennial, ISBN 0-00-653164-4
- Mathews, Anne (1860), The life and correspondence of Charles Mathews, the elder, Comedian, London: Routledge, Warne and Routledge
- Thackeray, William Makepeace (1848), Vanity Fair, London: Bradbury and Evans
- Timbs, John (1866), English Eccentrics and Eccentricities, vol. 1, London: Richard Bentley
- Thompson, James (1849), The History of Leicester from the time of the Romans to the end of the seventeenth century, Leicester: J. S. Crossley
- Wilson, G. H. (1806), The Eccentric Mirror, vol. 1, London: James Cundee
- Wilson, G. H. (1842), Wonderful Characters, London: J. Barr and Co.
