= Count Primo Magri =

Dwarf entertainer (1849–1920)

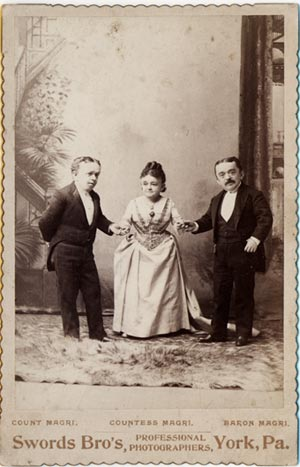
Count Primo Magri (left) with Lavinia Warren and Baron Magri (right) in about 1885

Count Primo Magri (1849–1920) and Count Rosebud were the stage names of a 19th-century Italian dwarf who married Lavinia Warren, the widow of General Tom Thumb on Easter Monday, April 6, 1885, at the Church of the Holy Trinity in New York City.

== Career ==
At 2 feet 8 inches (81 cm) tall Magri was two inches (5 cm) shorter than Lavinia's first husband. Together they operated a famous roadside stand in Middleborough, Massachusetts, and with their troupe composed of other dwarves as well as people of regular height travelled the world, performing plays such as The Rivals and Gulliver Among the Lilliputians before the public and royalty, including Queen Victoria.

Magri's supposed twin brother, Giuseppe (or Ernesto) Magri (1850–?), also a dwarf, used the stage names Baron Magri and Baron Littlefinger.

While the military and aristocratic titles that P. T. Barnum gave his dwarves were fantasy titles, it is claimed that the Count was given his title by Pope Pius IX.

The Magris were said to have had very expensive tastes, and were therefore forced to exhibit themselves into old age. He appeared in a 1915 silent film, The Lilliputian's Courtship, as Uncle Tiny Mite along with Lavinia.

== Death ==
Count Primo Magri died in 1920 at Middleborough, Massachusetts, aged 71 years.
