= Edmund Newell =

Dwarf who worked with P. T. Barnum

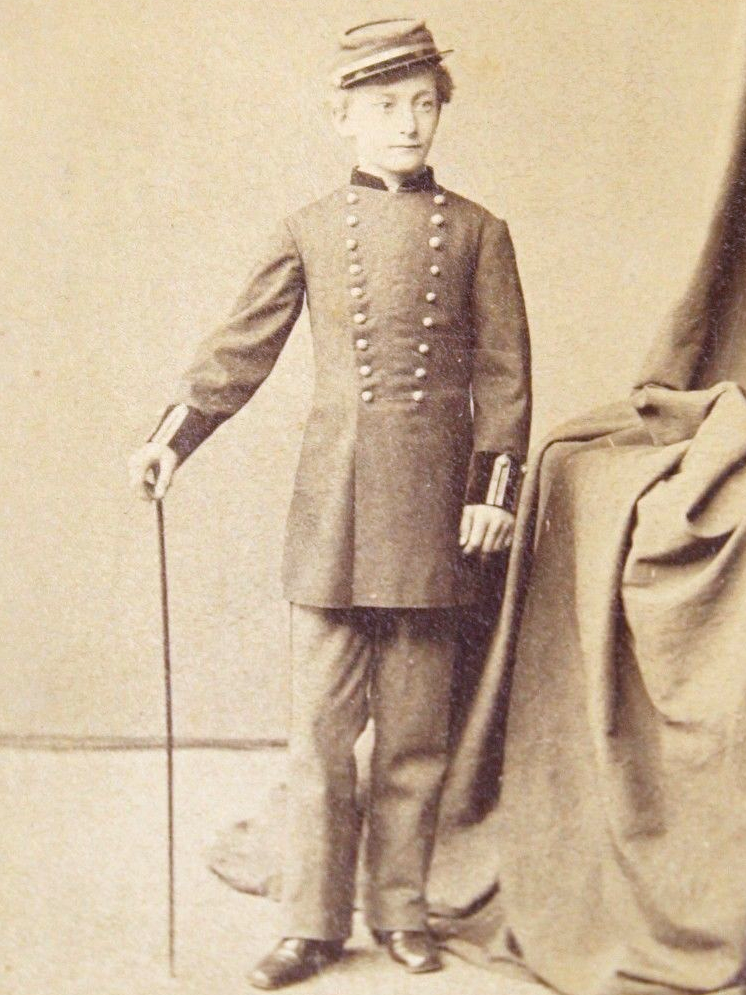
- Newell in the 1870s
- Born: July 27, 1857; Chicago, Illinois, U.S.
- Died: December 23, 1915 (aged 58); Marylebone, London, England
- Other names: General Grant Jr. Major Edward Newell
- Occupation: Sideshow performer

Edmund Newell (July 27, 1857 – December 23, 1915), better known as General Grant Jr. or Major Edward Newell, was a 19th-century dwarf who gained fame as an associate of P. T. Barnum.

== Life ==
He was born in Chicago, Illinois, to Edmund S. Newell and Sarah Ellen Jimmerson.

Edmund married Minnie Warren in July 1877 in Lock Haven, Pennsylvania. Minnie was also a dwarf, and so was her sister, Lavinia Warren, wife of General Tom Thumb. Minnie died in childbirth in 1878, and was buried in Nemasket Hill Cemetery, Middleborough, Massachusetts.

After her death, Edmund moved to England and married Mary Ann Drake, a woman of normal stature, on April 5, 1888, in St. Giles, London, England. They had two children: Edmund Charles Jeffreys Newell and Daisy Louise Newell.

Edmund died on December 23, 1915, in Marylebone, London, England.

== Bibliography ==
Notes

References

- Disability History Museum, FIRST (2016). "Lavinia And Minnie Warren". Straight Ahead Pictures.
- Kunhardt, Peter W.; Kunhardt, Philip B. (1995). P.T. Barnum: America's Greatest Showman. Alfred A. Knopf. ISBN 9780679435747. - Total pages: 358
- ""COMMODORE NUTT" DEAD.; THE HISTORY OF THE WELL-KNOWN DWARF". The New York Times. May 26, 1881.
- Rock Island Argus (February 14, 1916). "Famous Midget Dead In Europe". Rock Island Argus. ISSN 2332-0680. OCLC 26846738. Archived from the original on April 12, 2016. Alt URL
- Smithsonian Institution (2016). "George Washington Morrison Nutt and Minnie Warren". Smithsonian Institution.
