= Beaubien House =

Historic house in Detroit, Michigan

- Charles Trombly House
- U.S. National Register of Historic Places
- Michigan State Historic Site
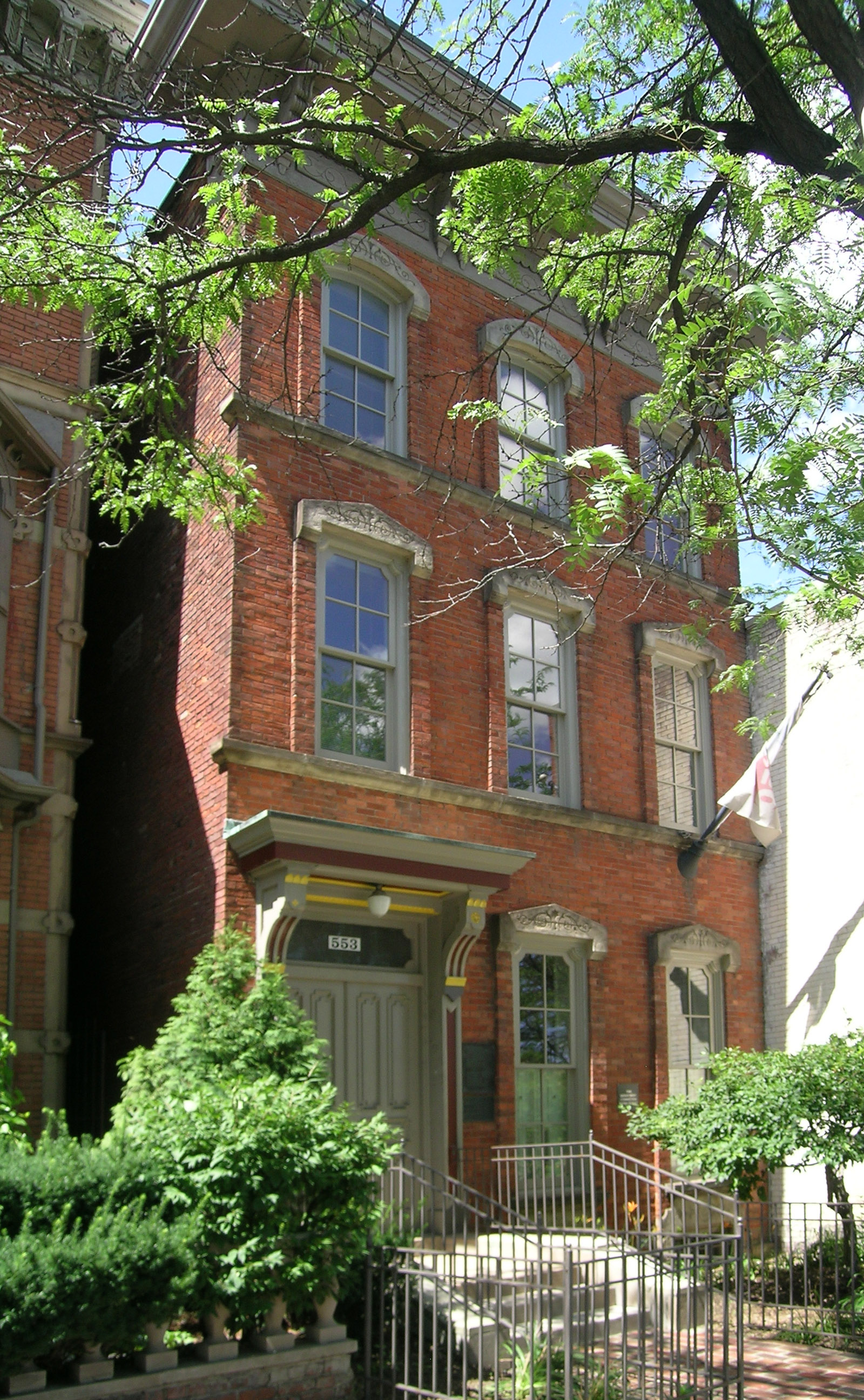
- Interactive map
- Location: 553 East Jefferson Avenue, Detroit, Michigan
- Coordinates: 42°19′53″N 83°2′21″W
- Built: 1851
- Architectural style: Italianate
- NRHP reference No.: 79001178

Significant dates
- Added to NRHP: August 13, 1979
- Designated MSHS: August 15, 1975

The Charles Trombly House is located at 553 East Jefferson Avenue in Detroit, Michigan. It is more commonly known as the Beaubien House, and is currently the headquarters of the Michigan Architectural Foundation and the American Institute of Architects of Michigan. The building is one of the oldest remaining houses in Detroit, and was designated a Michigan State Historic Site in 1975 and listed on the National Register of Historic Places in 1979.

== History ==
The Beaubien House is built on the site of one of Detroit's original ribbon farms, owned by Antoine Beaubien. The farm had a quarter of a mile frontage on the river, but which ran nearly three miles inland. Beaubien was a Colonel in the Detroit Militia and received the patent certificate for his land in 1810.

In June 1850, just before his death, Antoine Beaubien sold lot 8 on Jefferson to Charles J. Trombly for the sum of $2,000. Trombly was Beaubien's cousin and a recent graduate of Georgetown College. The consensus among historians is that the house was built by Trombly sometime during 1851 for use by Trombly and his new wife.

Over the next two decades, the house was owned or rented by multiple families. These include some of the city's oldest and most familiar names, such as McClelland, Cicotte, Whipple, Chapoton, Campau, and Beecher, among others. In 1872, the house was sold to John F. Antisdel, whose family owned or rented the home until 1943 (save a five-year period when William H. Machen lived in the home).

After World War II, ownership records are spotty. In 1956, photographer Fred A. Plofchan rented the house; he bought it in 1965. During this time, plumbing lines were extended to the upper levels, which were rented as studio apartments, and the house was used as a combination of office and residential space. The Michigan Architectural Foundation later rented the building, completely renovating it in 1987.

== Architecture ==
The house is constructed of brick and sits on a fieldstone foundation. Walls are constructed of plaster over 2" X 6" studs. The house has a full basement and three floors above. The first floor consists of a front parlor with a marble manteled fireplace, and two smaller rooms, one of which was likely a dining room. Both the second and third floors had two rooms.
