= Commodore Nutt =

American entertainer (1848–1881)

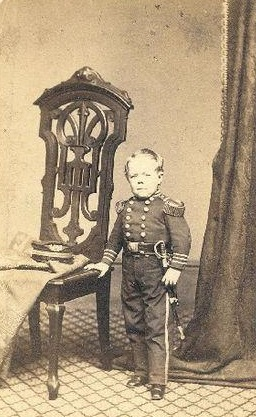
- Nutt in his stage costume, c. 1865
- Born: George Washington Morrison Nutt; April 1, 1848; Manchester, New Hampshire, U.S.
- Died: May 25, 1881 (aged 33); New York City, U.S.
- Resting place: Merrill Cemetery, Manchester, New Hampshire
- Occupation: Entertainer
- Years active: c. 1854–1881
- Employers: P. T. Barnum; Harry Deakin's Lilliputian Comic Opera Company
- Known for: One of P. T. Barnum's most popular performers; International tours with General Tom Thumb, Lavinia Warren, and Minnie Warren
- Height: 29 to 30 in (74 to 76 cm) (1862); 43 in (110 cm) (1881)
- Spouse: Lilian Elston (m. 1879)

George Washington Morrison Nutt (April 1, 1848 – May 25, 1881), better known by his stage name Commodore Nutt, was an American entertainer with dwarfism who became one of the most popular attractions exhibited by P. T. Barnum during the mid-19th century. Known for his quick wit, military costumes, and charismatic stage presence, Nutt achieved international fame through performances at Barnum's American Museum and on world tours before European royalty alongside General Tom Thumb, Lavinia Warren, and Minnie Warren.

Barnum hired Nutt in 1861 after discovering him touring New England and transformed him into the fictional "Commodore Nutt", complete with miniature naval uniforms, a custom carriage shaped like an English walnut, and an extensive publicity campaign that promoted him as "The $30,000 Nutt". Although audiences frequently confused him with General Tom Thumb, the two performers often appeared together on stage and became among Barnum's best-known attractions.

Nutt's unrequited love for fellow performer Lavinia Warren, who instead married General Tom Thumb in one of Barnum's most celebrated publicity events, became one of the best-known stories associated with his career. After touring the world with Barnum's troupe between 1869 and 1872, Nutt left Barnum's employ, performed with theatrical companies, operated businesses on the American West Coast, and later returned to New York City, where he died of Bright's disease in 1881.

== Birth and family ==
George Washington Morrison Nutt was born in Manchester, New Hampshire, to Major Rodnia Nutt (1810–1875), and his wife Maria (Dodge) Nutt (1807–1859) of Goffstown, New Hampshire. Rodnia was a rich farmer, a Manchester city marshal, and a Manchester city councilman.

The Nutts had five children. The first, whose name and sex are not known, was born on 8 December 1837. James Dodge was born on 28 January 1838, and Rodnia Jr. on 11 October 1840. A daughter, Mary Ann, was born on 22 September 1844. According to Nutt family records, George Washington Morrison was born on 1 April 1848.

== Medical condition ==
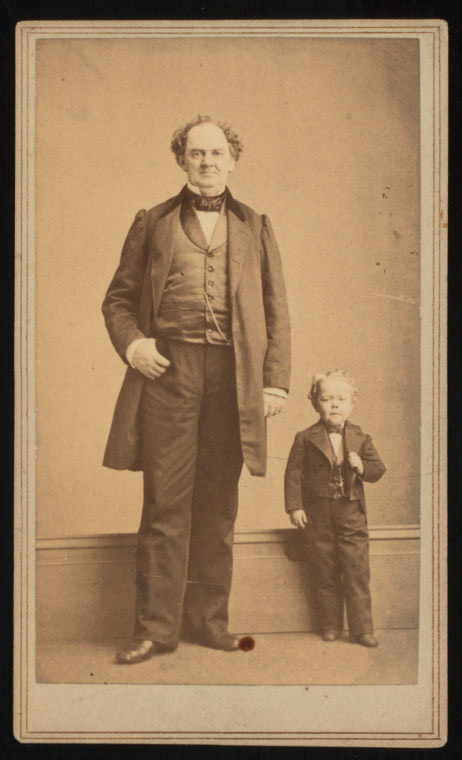
Barnum and Nutt, c. 1862

George Washington Morrison Nutt had dwarfism, although the specific cause was never identified in contemporary records. His parents were of average stature and his father stood more than 6 feet (1.8 m) tall and weighed over 250 pounds (110 kg). However, George and his older brother, Rodnia Jr., were both little people. By 1861, Rodnia measured about 49 inches (120 cm) in height, while the 13-year-old George was approximately 29 inches (74 cm) tall and weighed about 25 pounds (11 kg).

Contemporaries frequently remarked on Nutt's proportions. In his autobiography, P. T. Barnum described him as "perfectly formed" with "a splendid head". At the time of his debut at Barnum's American Museum in 1862, Nutt stood between 29 and 30 inches (74 and 76 cm) tall. Over the following two decades, he continued to grow, and by the time of his death in 1881, he measured about 43 inches (110 cm) in height and weighed just under 70 pounds (32 kg).

== Career ==
Nutt may have begun performing as early as 1854, when circus manager William C. Walker later claimed to have discovered him and exhibited him with a small circus in his hometown of Manchester, New Hampshire. Although the details of this period are uncertain, by 1861, the 13-year-old Nutt was touring the New England countryside with a manager known as Lillie, who charged admission fees as low as five cents to see him. P. T. Barnum believed Nutt was being poorly managed and that his education had been neglected.

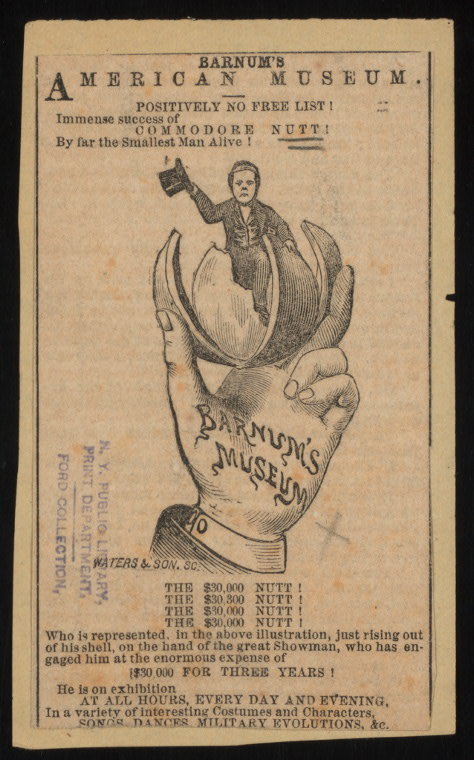
Publicity material for Nutt, c. 1862

Later in 1861, Nutt and his 21-year-old brother, Rodnia Jr., signed a five-year contract to perform at Barnum's American Museum in New York City. Barnum described Nutt as "a most remarkable dwarf", "a sharp, intelligent little fellow", with "a deal of drollery and wit", "a splendid head", and "perfectly formed". He concluded that, "for a 'showman' [he] was a perfect treasure". Under the agreement, the brothers received food, clothing, lodging, travel expenses, medical care, an education, weekly salaries with annual increases, and a share of the proceeds from souvenir books and photographs. Barnum also promised each brother a carriage and a pair of ponies when the contract ended.

Before Nutt's public debut, Barnum spread rumours that rival showmen were competing to hire him before claiming he had paid $30,000 for Nutt's contract. Newspapers soon nicknamed him "The $30,000 Nutt". Nutt was given the stage name Commodore Nutt, dressed in miniature naval uniforms, and driven through the streets of New York City in a custom carriage shaped like an English walnut and pulled by Shetland ponies. Barnum later wrote that these carriage rides were the museum's best form of advertisement.

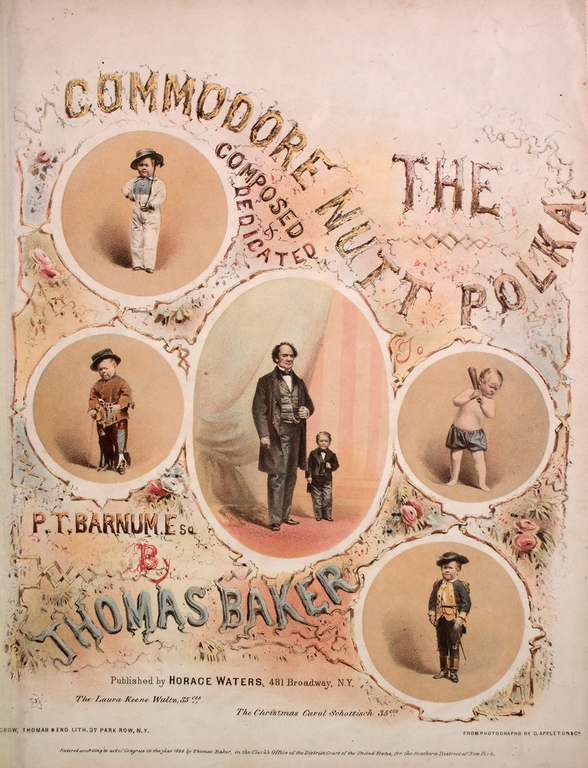
Sheet music cover for "The Commodore Nutt Polka" by Thomas Baker, c. 1862

In February 1862, the 13-year-old Nutt made his debut at Barnum's American Museum and was an immediate success. Many visitors believed they were being "humbugged", insisting that Nutt was actually General Tom Thumb in disguise. Although Thumb had grown older and heavier while touring, many visitors either forgot or ignored the differences. Nutt reportedly enjoyed the confusion and encouraged the mistake.

To answer claims that he was really Thumb in disguise, Nutt appeared alongside General Tom Thumb after Thumb returned from a tour of the American South and West. Advertised as "The Two Dromios" and "The Two Smallest Men, and Greatest Curiosities Living", the pair first appeared together on 11 August 1862. Even after seeing them on the same stage, some visitors remained convinced that Nutt was Thumb in disguise. Barnum later remarked that "it is very amusing to see how people will sometimes deceive themselves by being too incredulous."

About two months after his debut, the 14-year-old Nutt was appointed an honorary policeman by the New York City Police Department. After ordering a uniform, he jokingly sent a telegram to officers at the Ninth Precinct announcing that he had joined the Broadway Squad with "extraordinary powers to arrest" people outside the museum and "take [them] upstairs".

== President Lincoln ==
President Abraham Lincoln asked Barnum and Nutt to come to the White House in November 1862. When the two arrived, Lincoln left a cabinet meeting to welcome them. Nutt asked Salmon P. Chase, the Secretary of the Treasury, if he was the man who was spending so much of Uncle Sam's money. Edwin M. Stanton, Secretary of War, interrupted to say that he was the man. "Well," said Nutt, "It is in a good cause, anyhow, and I guess it will come out all right."

As Barnum and Nutt were on their way out, President Lincoln shook Nutt's hand. He told the Commodore that he should "wade ashore" if his "fleet" was ever in danger. Nutt looked up and down Lincoln's long legs. "I guess, Mr. President", he said, "You could do that better than I could."

== Marriage and relationships ==
During the early 1860s, Nutt fell in love with fellow performer Lavinia Warren after she joined P. T. Barnum's Barnum's American Museum in 1862. Barnum gave Warren a diamond and emerald ring that did not fit her finger and asked her to give it to Nutt as a token of friendship. Nutt instead believed the ring was a sign of her affection, and his feelings for her deepened. Warren, however, thought of him only as a friend, describing him as a "nice little boy".

At the same time, fellow performer General Tom Thumb also began courting Warren. Recognizing the publicity the match would generate, Barnum encouraged their relationship. By February 1863, Nutt learned that the couple were engaged after unexpectedly finding them together at Barnum's home. Although he later served as Thumb's best man at their widely publicized wedding, he privately blamed both Thumb and Barnum for what he called a "dastardly" offense.

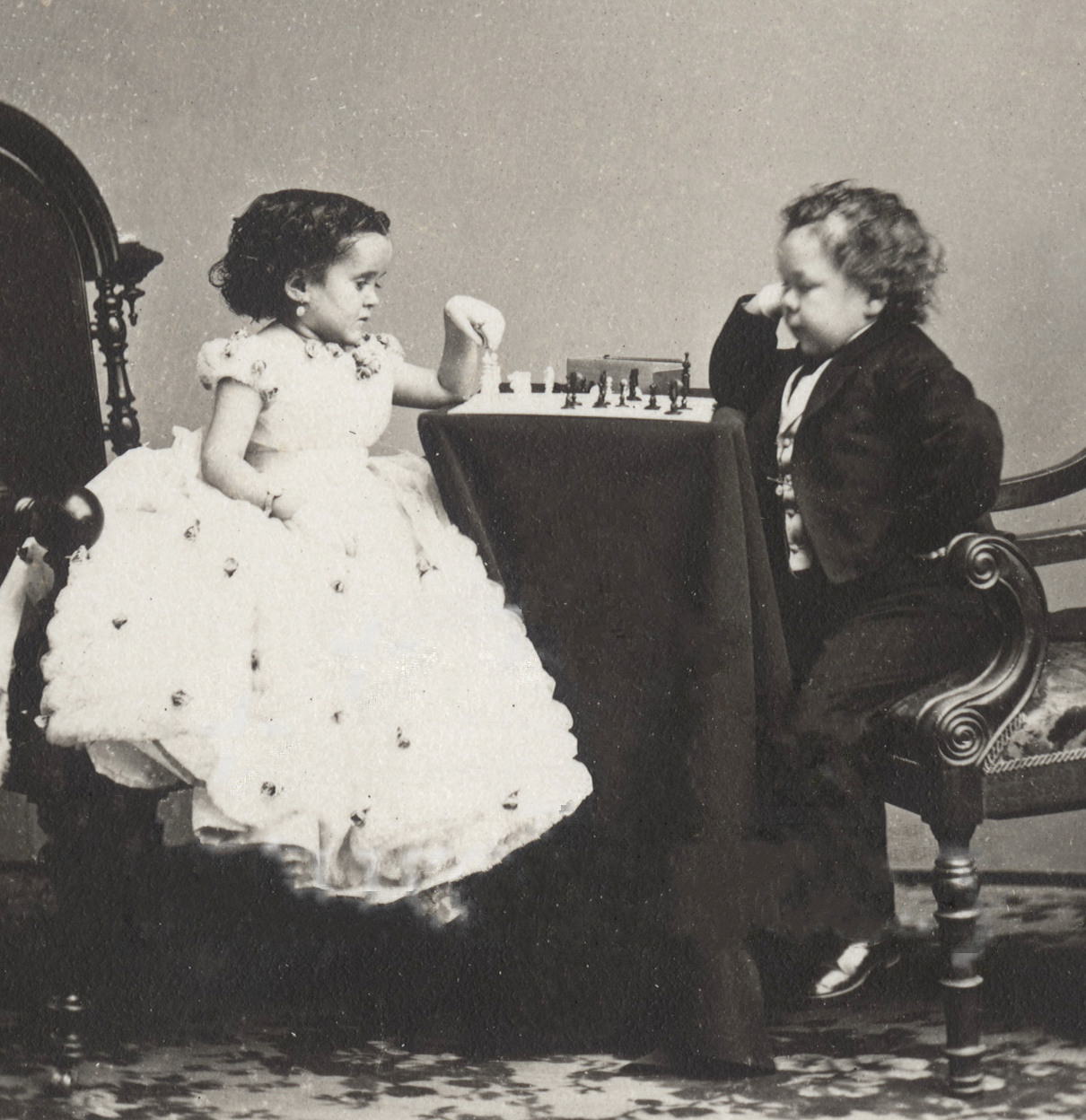
Nutt with Minnie Warren in 1863

After the engagement, Barnum suggested that Nutt marry Warren's younger sister, Minnie Warren. Nutt declined, saying that he had "little faith in women" and would not marry "the best woman living". Over the following years, newspapers repeatedly but incorrectly reported that Nutt and Minnie had married. In reality, they remained close friends and frequent stage partners, and Minnie later married entertainer Edmund Newell.

Years later, Barnum asked Nutt why he had never married. Nutt replied, "Sir, my fruit is plucked," adding that he had decided not to marry until he was thirty and that he would prefer "a good, green country girl" as a wife.

In 1879, Nutt married Lilian Elston of Redwood City, California, whom he had met while touring the American West. Elston was of average stature. The couple remained married until Nutt's death in 1881.

== World tour and aftermath ==
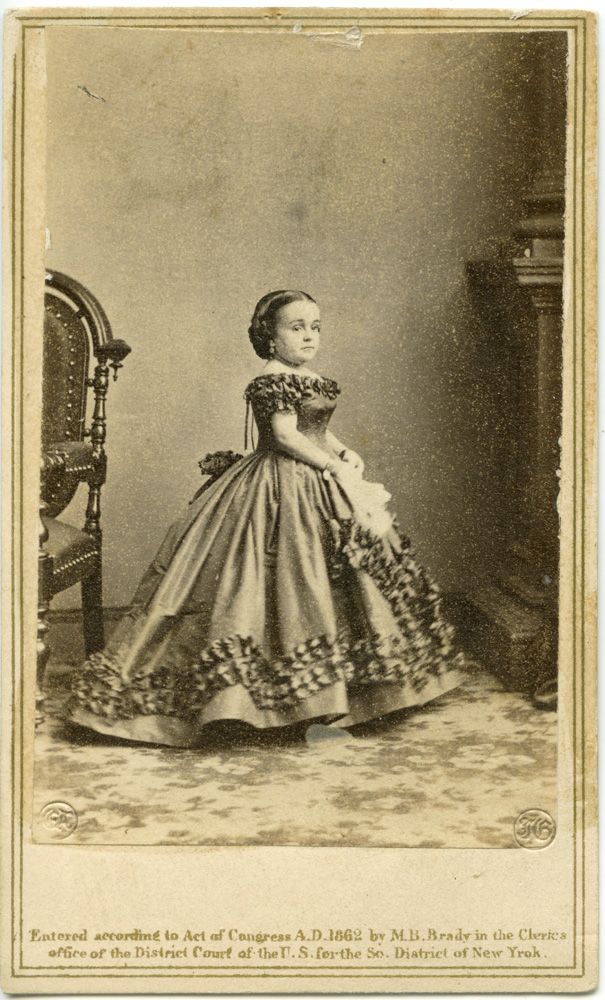
Lavinia Warren, 1862

Following the highly publicized marriage of General Tom Thumb and Lavinia Warren in 1863, P. T. Barnum capitalized on the public's fascination with his troupe of little people by organizing extensive tours of the United States and Europe. Between 1869 and 1872, Nutt, Thumb, Lavinia Warren, and Minnie Warren toured the world together as "The Tom Thumb Company".

The four little people left the United States on 21 June 1869. They travelled 60,000 miles (97,000 km) around the world, visited 587 cities and towns, and gave 1,471 performances of songs, speeches, and military drills. They returned to America in 1872. Nutt and Barnum argued after the tour. Nutt quit. He joined Harry Deakin's Lilliputian Comic Opera Company. This company toured America in an operetta called Jack, the Giant Killer.

Nutt and his brother Rodnia put together a variety show. It played in Portland, Oregon. It was not a success. Nutt went to San Francisco, California, and put together another show. He tired of the life within a year and quit. Another show he put together about this time was not successful either. Nutt ran a couple of saloons in Oregon and San Francisco, but these were not successes.

After his failures on the West Coast, Nutt went back to New York City. He bought a saloon, which was closed after he was caught selling liquor without a license. Nutt was in charge of an amusement area called Rockaway Pier for a time. He returned to performing with an act called "Tally-Ho".

== Death ==
Early in 1881, Nutt had an attack of Bright's disease (nephritis). He was sick for more than two months. He died on 25 May 1881 at the Anthony House in New York City. Nutt's wife cried over his coffin at the funeral. She called him her "dear little boy", and said that he was "so good". Nutt was buried in Merrill Cemetery at Manchester, New Hampshire.

His grave is unmarked. It is thought that he was buried in a spot either next to or possibly between his parents, or between the siblings that were also interred in the family plot.

Nutt had grown from his original 29 inches (74 cm) to 43 inches (110 cm), and weighed a little less than 70 pounds (32 kg) at his death. In 1891, the editors of Appleton's Cyclopedia wrote, "Commodore Nutt was distinguished for large-hearted virtues that are often lacking in bigger men; his genial temper was allied to constancy and generosity that entitle his memory to the highest respect." The editors noted that Nutt was "for many years faithful to an early love."
