= General Tom Thumb =

American circus performer (1838–1883)

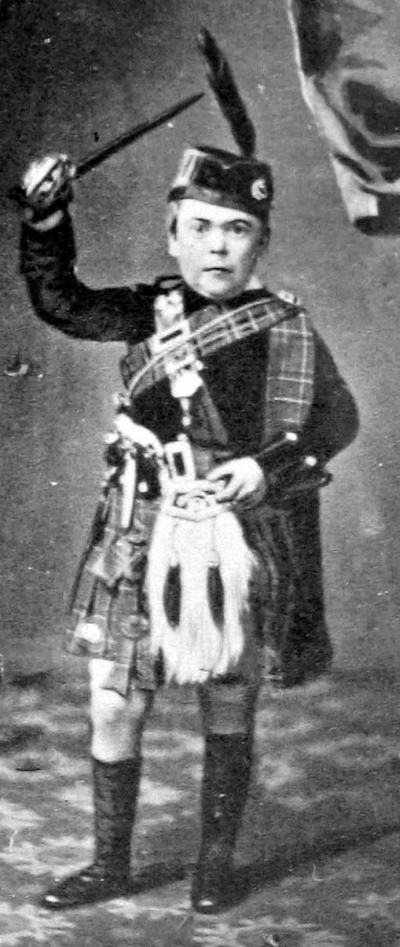
- General Tom Thumb in 1862
- Born: Charles Sherwood Stratton; January 4, 1838; Bridgeport, Connecticut, U.S.
- Died: July 15, 1883 (aged 45); Bridgeport, Connecticut, U.S.
- Resting place: Mountain Grove Cemetery, Bridgeport; 41.17189°N 73.22465°W
- Known for: Circus performer
- Height: 3 ft 4 in (102 cm)
- Spouse: Lavinia Warren (m. 1863)

Charles Sherwood Stratton (January 4, 1838 – July 15, 1883), better known by his stage name "General Tom Thumb", was an American with dwarfism who achieved great fame as a performer under circus pioneer P. T. Barnum.

== Childhood and early life ==
Stratton was born January 4, 1838, in Bridgeport, Connecticut, the son of a carpenter named Sherwood Edward Stratton. Sherwood married his first cousin Cynthia Thompson, daughter of Joseph Thompson and Mary Ann Sharpe.

== Medical condition ==
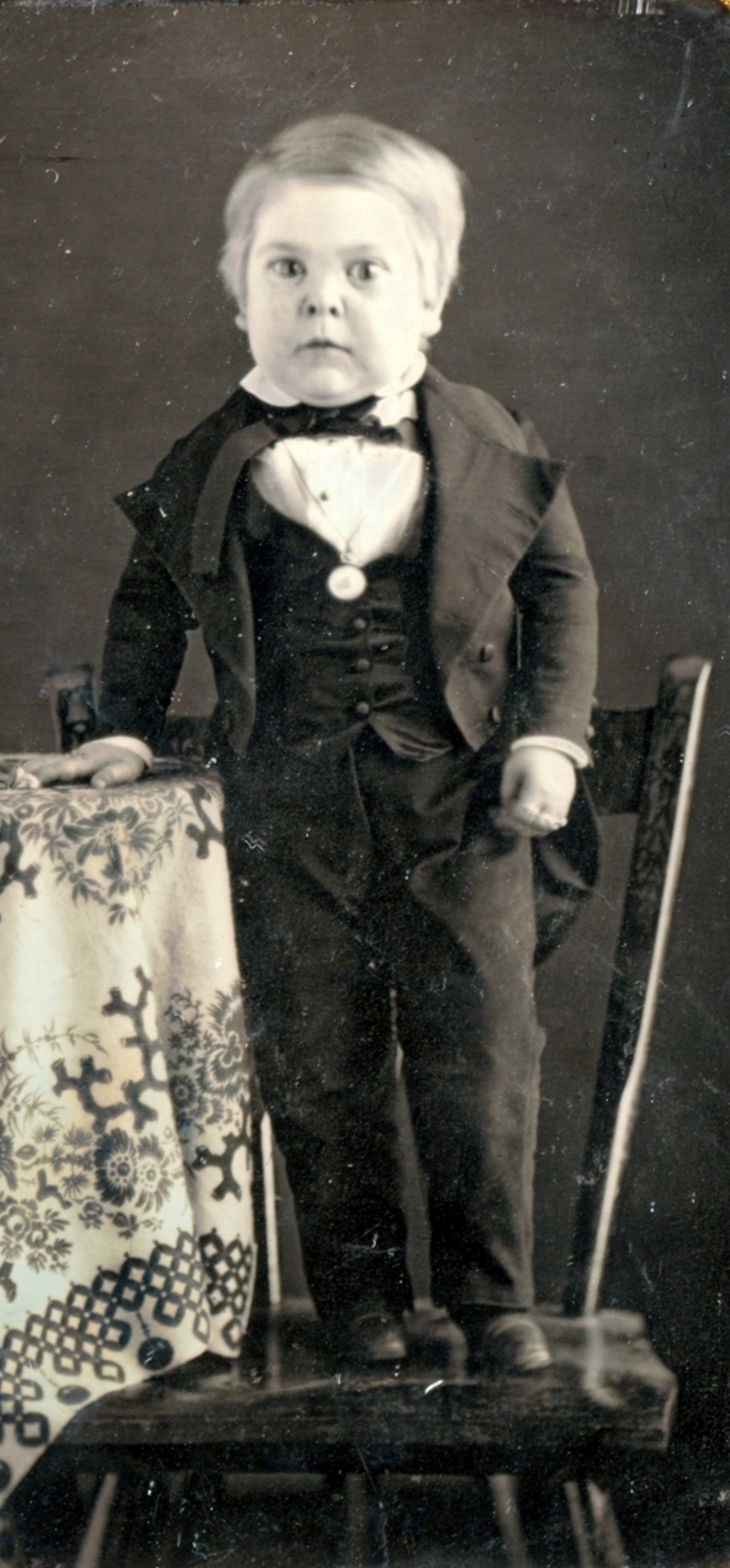
Stratton at 10 years of age

Stratton was born a healthy, average-sized baby, weighing 9 pounds 8 ounces (4.3 kg) at birth. During the first six months of his life, he developed normally, reaching a height of 25 inches (64 cm) and weighing 15 pounds (6.8 kg). During his first year, however, his growth suddenly stopped. After noticing that he had not grown during the following six months, his parents consulted a physician, who told them there was little chance that he would ever reach average adult height.

Apart from his short stature, Stratton was a healthy child whose body remained proportionate and functional, and whose siblings were of average height. By late 1842, when he was five years old, he had grown only one inch (2.5 cm) since he was six months old and had not gained any additional weight. Although his growth remained extremely limited, he reached an adult height of 2 feet 11 inches (89 cm).

During Stratton's lifetime, the cause of his short stature was unknown. His extreme shortness is generally referred to today as pituitary dwarfism. However, no definitive diagnosis was possible because X-rays were not discovered until 1895, twelve years after his death, and the medical techniques available in the nineteenth century were unable to determine the underlying pathology.

== Career ==
In 1842, at the age of four, Stratton began his performing career after P. T. Barnum discovered him and taught him to sing, dance, mime, and impersonate famous people. Performing as General Tom Thumb, he toured the United States with a programme that included portrayals of characters such as Cupid and Napoleon Bonaparte, alongside singing, dancing, and comic banter with a straight man. The tour was a great success and quickly expanded as demand for his performances grew.

In 1844, Stratton travelled to Europe with Barnum on a three-year tour that made him an international celebrity. During the tour, he appeared before Queen Victoria, met the young Prince of Wales, and, in 1845, starred in Le petit Poucet at the Théâtre du Vaudeville in Paris. The European tour drew large crowds wherever he appeared, and after returning to the United States in 1847, he continued touring as his popularity grew rapidly.

From the age of seven, Stratton also appeared in full-length fairy-tale melodramas under Barnum's management. Rather than performing only short exhibition routines, he took leading roles in productions including Hop o' My Thumb and The Seven League Boots. According to theatre historian Michael M. Chemers, these productions highlighted Stratton's skills as a professional performer rather than presenting him solely as an exhibition attraction.

After marrying fellow performer Lavinia Warren in 1863, Stratton continued to tour widely with her in Europe and British India. His long career on the stage made him independently wealthy. He owned a house in fashionable New York, a specially adapted home on Connecticut's Thimble Islands, a steam yacht, and a wardrobe of fine clothes. When Barnum encountered financial difficulties, Stratton loaned him money, and the two later became business partners. Stratton made his final appearance in England in 1878.

== Personal life ==
On his return home from his second tour in 1847, aboard the SS Cambria, he attracted the attention of the explorer John Palliser who "was not a little surprised, on entering the state-cabin, to hear the most unnatural shrill little pipe exclaiming, 'Waiter! bring me a Welsh rabbit'." During the voyage, General Tom Thumb contributed to a collection for the relief of famine victims in Ireland.

Stratton became a Freemason on October 3, 1862. Stratton, by now 2 feet 11 inches (89 cm) tall, was initiated to be a Freemason alongside a man who was 6 feet 3 inches (191 cm).

== Marriage and later life ==
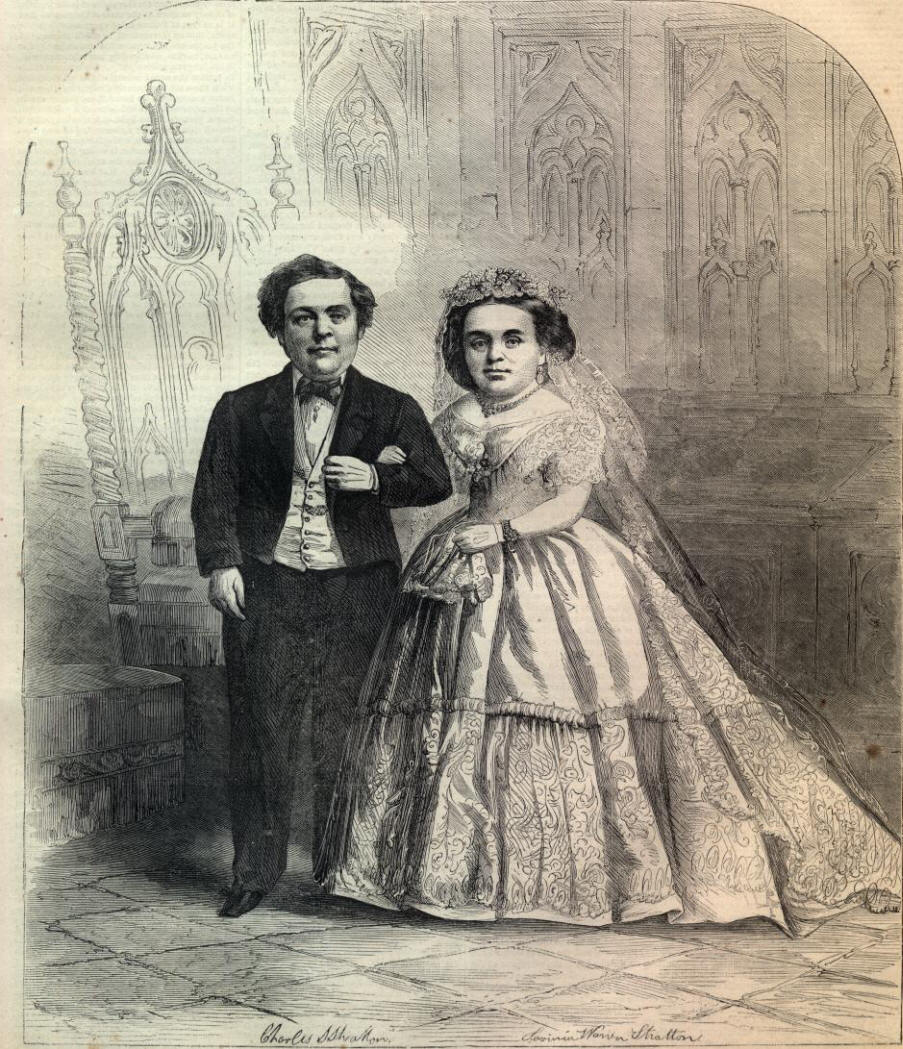
The wedding couple as they appeared on February 21, 1863, cover of Harper's Weekly magazine

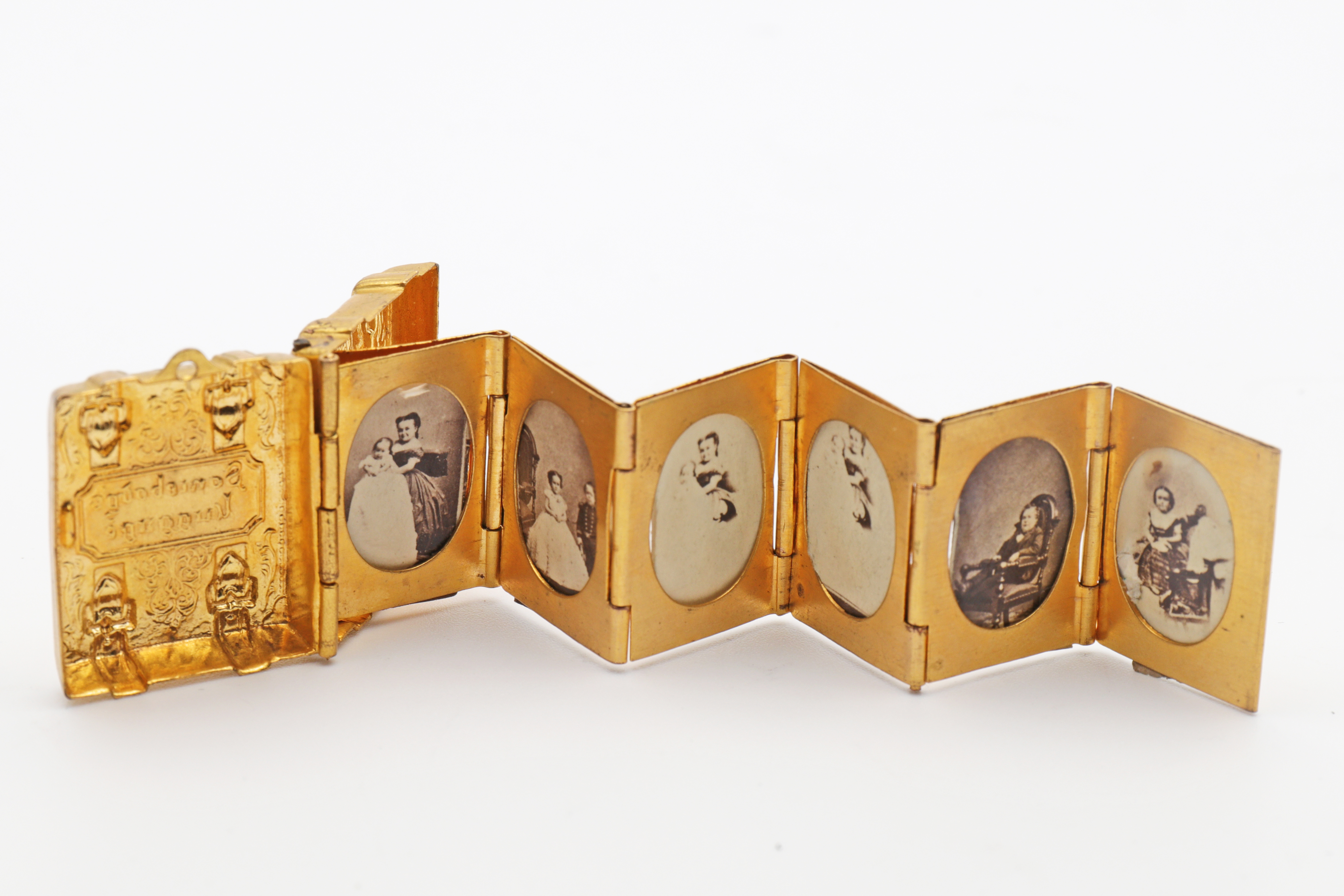
Tom Thumb wedding gift photo album

His marriage in 1863, to Lavinia Warren, also a little person, became front-page news. The wedding took place at Grace Episcopal Church, and the wedding reception was held at New York City's Metropolitan Hotel. The couple stood atop a grand piano at the reception to greet some 10,000 guests. The best man at the wedding was George Washington Morrison ("Commodore") Nutt, another dwarf performer in Barnum's employ.

The maid of honor was Minnie Warren, Lavinia's sister. Following the wedding, the couple was received by President Lincoln at the White House. Stratton and his wife toured together in Europe as well as British India, in particular the area that later became Bangladesh.

Under Barnum's management, Stratton became a wealthy man. He owned a house in the fashionable part of New York and a steam yacht, and he had a wardrobe of fine clothes. He also owned a specially adapted home on one of Connecticut's Thimble Islands. When Barnum got into financial difficulty, Stratton bailed him out. Later, they became business partners. Stratton made his final appearance in England in 1878.

In January 1883, Stratton was staying at John F. Antisdel's Newhall House in Milwaukee when a fire broke out, which Milwaukee historian John Gurda would call "one of the worst hotel fires in American history". More than 71 people died, but Tom and Lavinia were saved by their manager, Sylvester Bleeker. In 1885 Stratton and his wife were engaged at a new dime museum in Boston called the World's Museum, Menagerie, and Acquarium.

== Marketing and public image ==
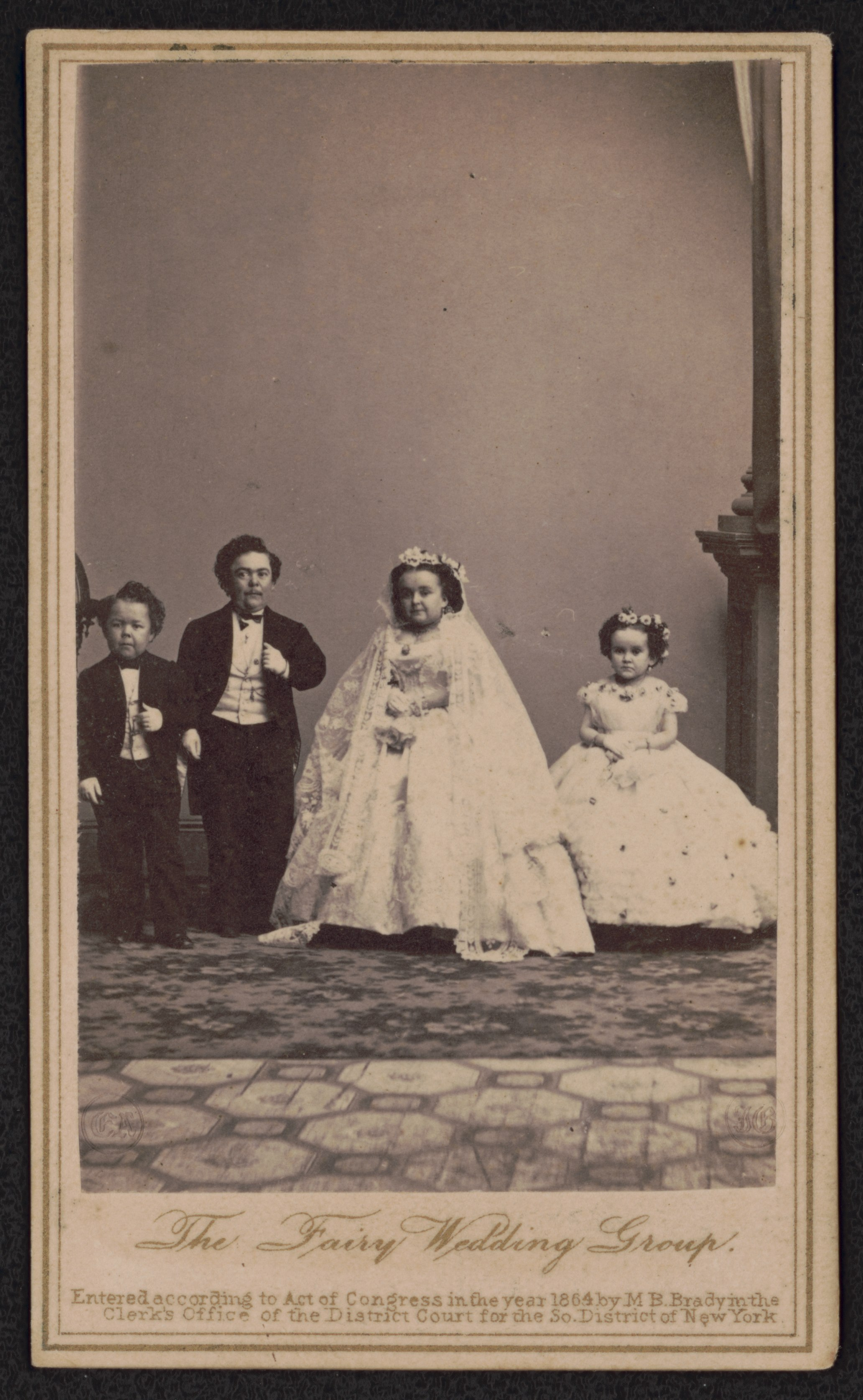
The Fairy Wedding group: Stratton and his bride Lavinia Warren, alongside her sister Minnie and George Washington Morrison Nutt ("Commodore Nutt"), entertainers associated with P. T. Barnum

From early in his career, Stratton performed under the stage name General Tom Thumb, a persona that became central to his public image. The name, borrowed from the English folktale Tom Thumb, distinguished him from other performers and became inseparable from his stage career. On stage, he combined impersonations of historical figures such as Napoleon Bonaparte with singing, dancing, comedy, and theatrical sketches.

During the 1840s and 1850s, Stratton toured the United States and Europe, becoming one of America's earliest celebrities with transatlantic fame. His appearances before Queen Victoria and other members of the British royal family, together with widely reported tours and crowded public appearances, helped establish his international reputation.

According to theatre historian Michael M. Chemers, Stratton's success helped reshape public perceptions of performers with unusual bodies. Rather than being presented solely as a human curiosity, he was widely recognized for his abilities as an actor, singer, dancer, and comedian. Contemporary dramatic critics often assessed his performances alongside those of other professional entertainers instead of defining him primarily by his stature.

Public interest extended beyond Stratton's stage career to his private life. His 1863 marriage to fellow performer Lavinia Warren attracted widespread newspaper coverage and became a public spectacle. Around 10,000 people attended the wedding reception at New York City's Metropolitan Hotel, and the couple were later received by President Abraham Lincoln at the White House.

== Death and legacy ==
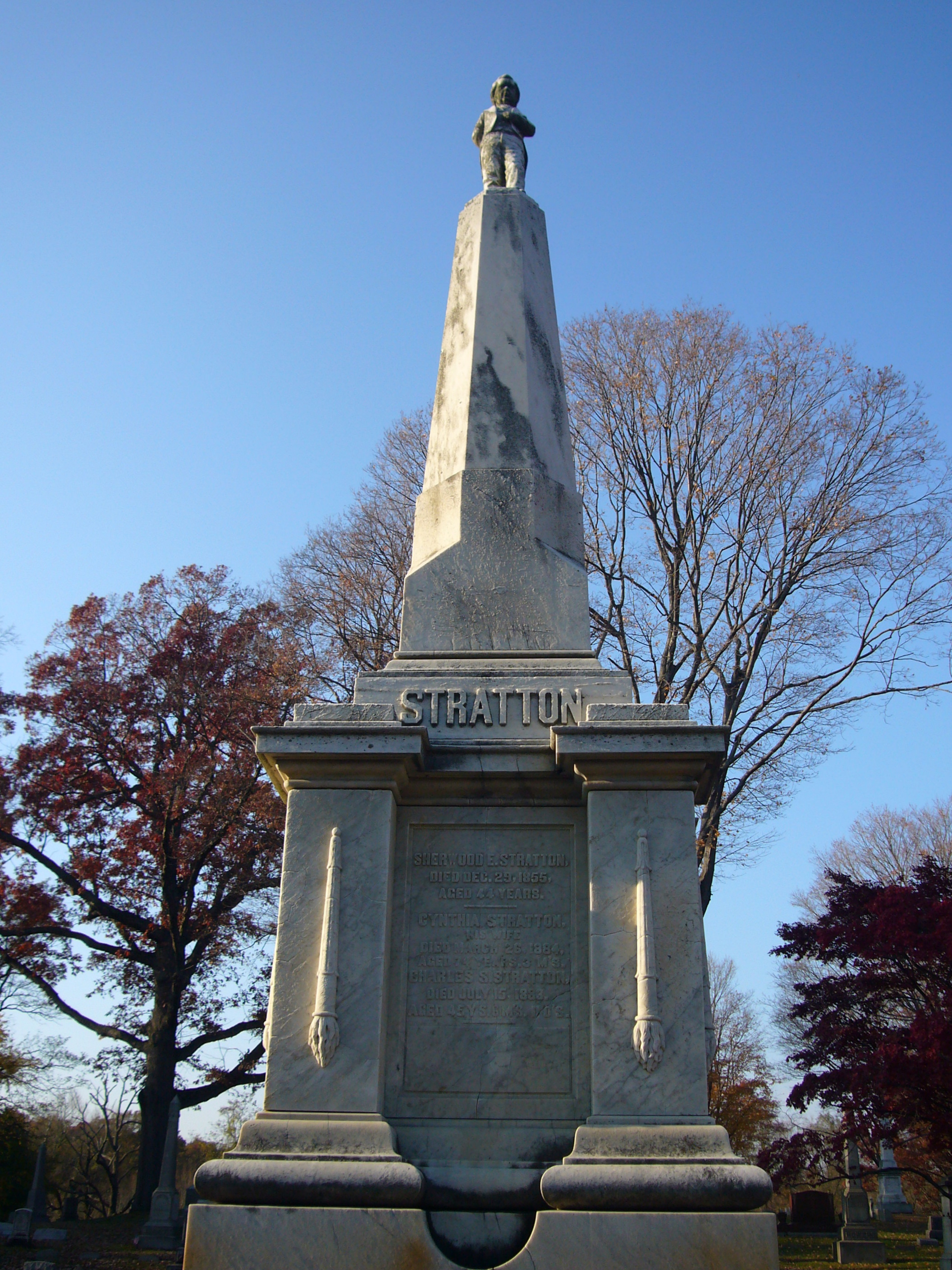
Stratton's grave at Mountain Grove Cemetery

Six months after surviving the Newhall House fire, Stratton died unexpectedly of a stroke. He was 45 years old. Over 20,000 people attended the funeral. P. T. Barnum purchased a life-sized statue of Tom Thumb and placed it as a gravestone at Mountain Grove Cemetery in Bridgeport, Connecticut. When Lavinia Warren died, more than 35 years later, she was interred next to him, with a simple gravestone that read "His Wife".

In 1959, vandals smashed the statue of Tom Thumb. It was restored by the Barnum Festival Society and Mountain Grove Cemetery Association with funds raised by public subscription.

He was buried with Masonic honors by Saint John's Lodge. He became Master Mason in St. John's Lodge No. 3 at Bridgeport, Connecticut, on October 8, 1862. He received the Commandery degrees of Masonic Knight Templar in Hamilton Commandery No. 5, at Bridgeport, Connecticut, in 1863.

== Screen portrayals ==
- George Brasno portrayed General Tom Thumb in the 1934 film The Mighty Barnum.
- Jimmy Clitheroe portrayed General Tom Thumb in the 1967 film Jules Verne's Rocket to the Moon.
- Paul Miller portrayed General Tom Thumb in the 1986 TV film Barnum!
- Sandor Raski portrayed General Tom Thumb in the 1986 TV film Barnum.
- Ed Gale portrayed General Tom Thumb in the 1995 TV film Tad.
- Josh Ryan Evans portrayed General Tom Thumb in the 1999 TV film P. T. Barnum.
- Sam Humphrey portrayed General Tom Thumb in the 2017 musical film The Greatest Showman.

== See also ==
- Stamford Museum, where a suit of his clothes is displayed for comparison with those of Daniel Lambert
- Tom Thumb House (Middleborough, Massachusetts), his summer house
- Middleborough Historical Museum, which exhibits a large collection of Tom Thumb memorabilia
