= Stamford Museum =

Former local museum in Stamford, England

Coordinates: 52°39′12″N 0°28′39″W

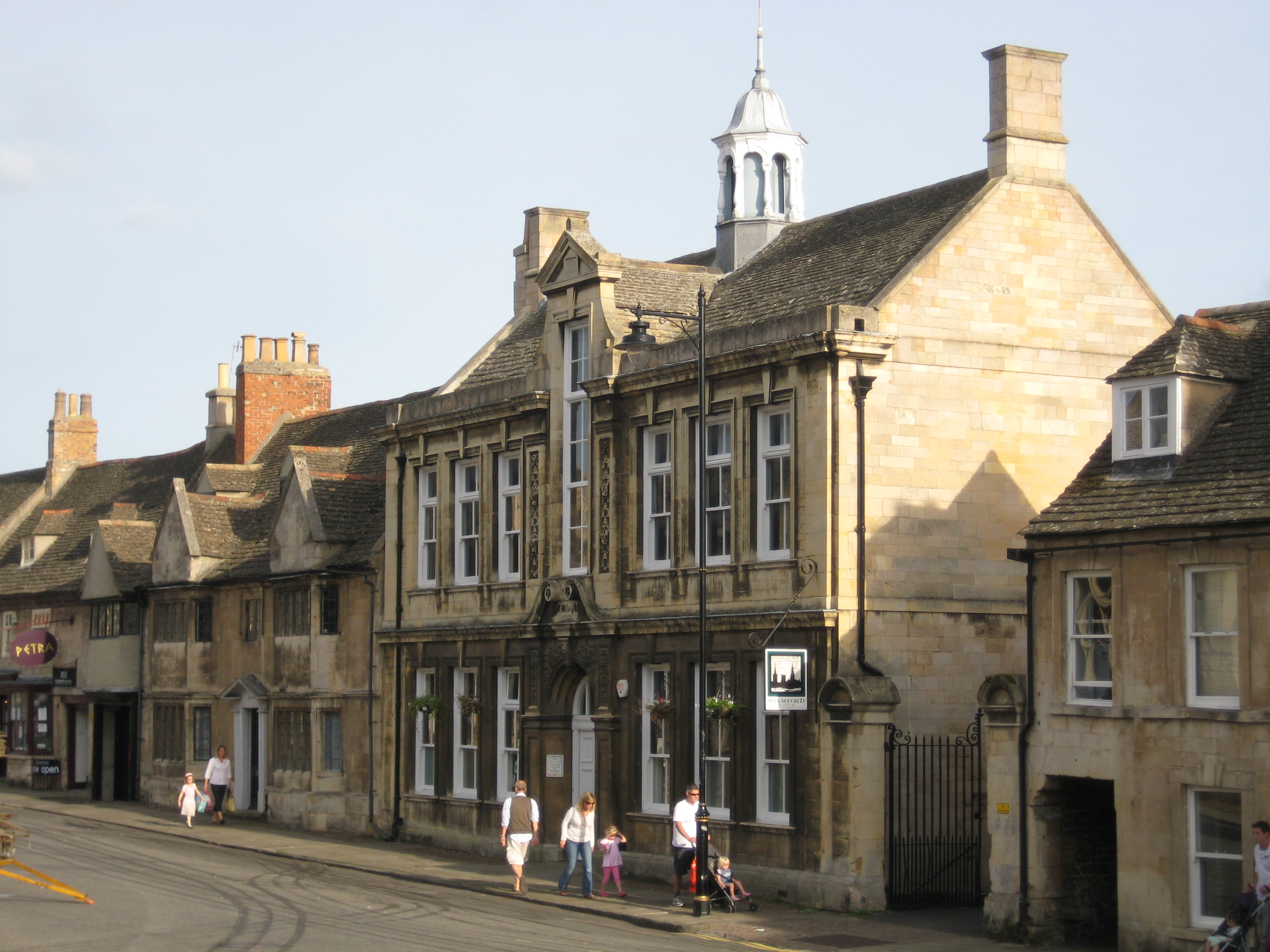
- The former Stamford Museum, pictured in September 2009
- Location: Broad Street, Stamford
- Collection size: Stamford ware, Bull running
- Website: https://www.lincolnshire.gov.uk/heritage-and-tourism/discover-stamford/

Stamford Museum was located in Stamford, Lincolnshire, in Great Britain. It was housed in a Victorian building in Broad Street, Stamford, and was run by the museum services of Lincolnshire County Council from 1980 to 2011.

== The building and area ==
The building was built in 1895 as a technical school and has the words School of Art and the town crest carved above its doorway. It is built from oolitic limestone and designed by local architect, John Charles Traylen. The museum moved to these premises in 1980, having originally been located in the library on High Street where it had opened in 1961.

Stamford was declared England's first Conservation Area in 1967. The town has been here since Anglo-Saxon and Viking times. Five medieval churches, a 15th-century almshouse as well as many other historic buildings remain.

== Collections ==
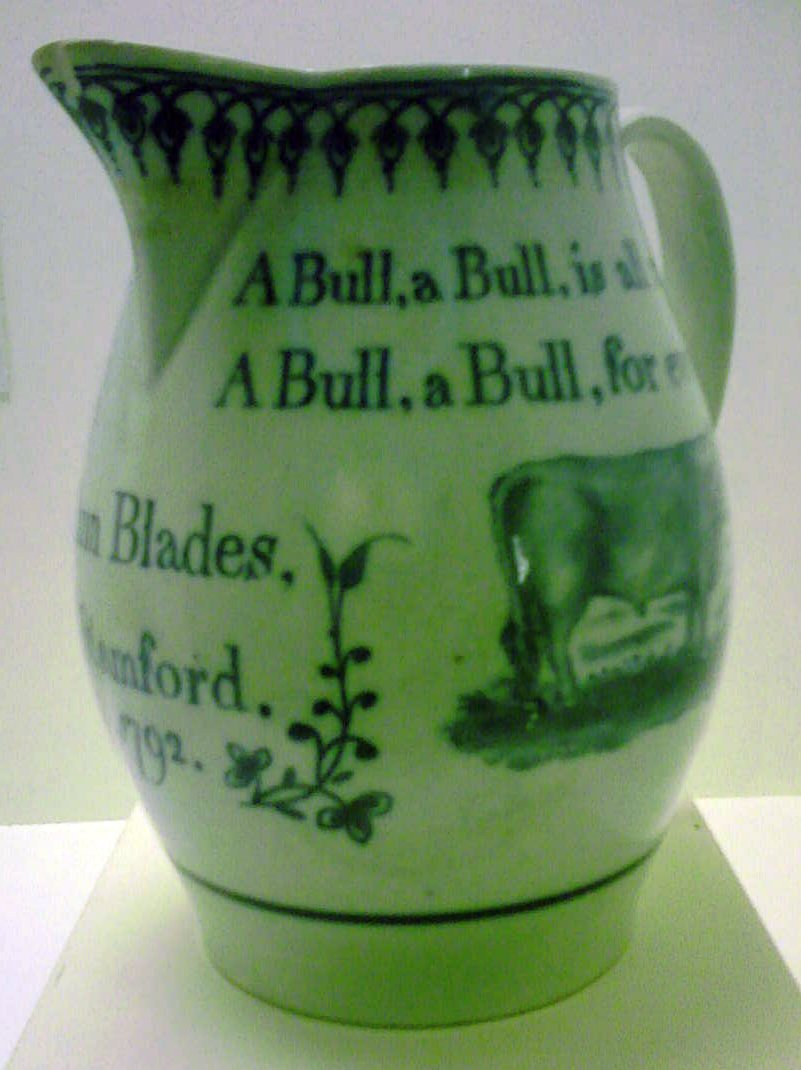
A jug that celebrates Ann Blades - a Stamford bull-runner in 1792

The museum interpreted the town's history, including Stamford Ware Pottery and the 18th-century Daniel Lambert, renowned for his girth. Notable exhibits included a Blackstone oil engine and the only known fragment of the Stamford Eleanor Cross.

In the upper gallery were permanent displays on the archaeology and social history of the town. The lower galleries hosted a regular programme of temporary exhibitions. Also on display here was the Stamford Tapestry, which took 17 years to make and was hung in 2000 as part of the Millennium celebration.

There was a large research collection available by appointment. It included a number of photographs and information files on local people, places and events.

== Closure ==
In June 2010 it was announced that the Museum would close because of Lincolnshire County Council cuts. Despite local opposition, the museum closed on 30 June 2011.

Some of the former exhibits have been relocated to the Discover Stamford area at the town's Library.

Since 2015 the building has been leased by Wildcats Theatre School.
