= Minnie Warren =

American entertainer (1849–1878)

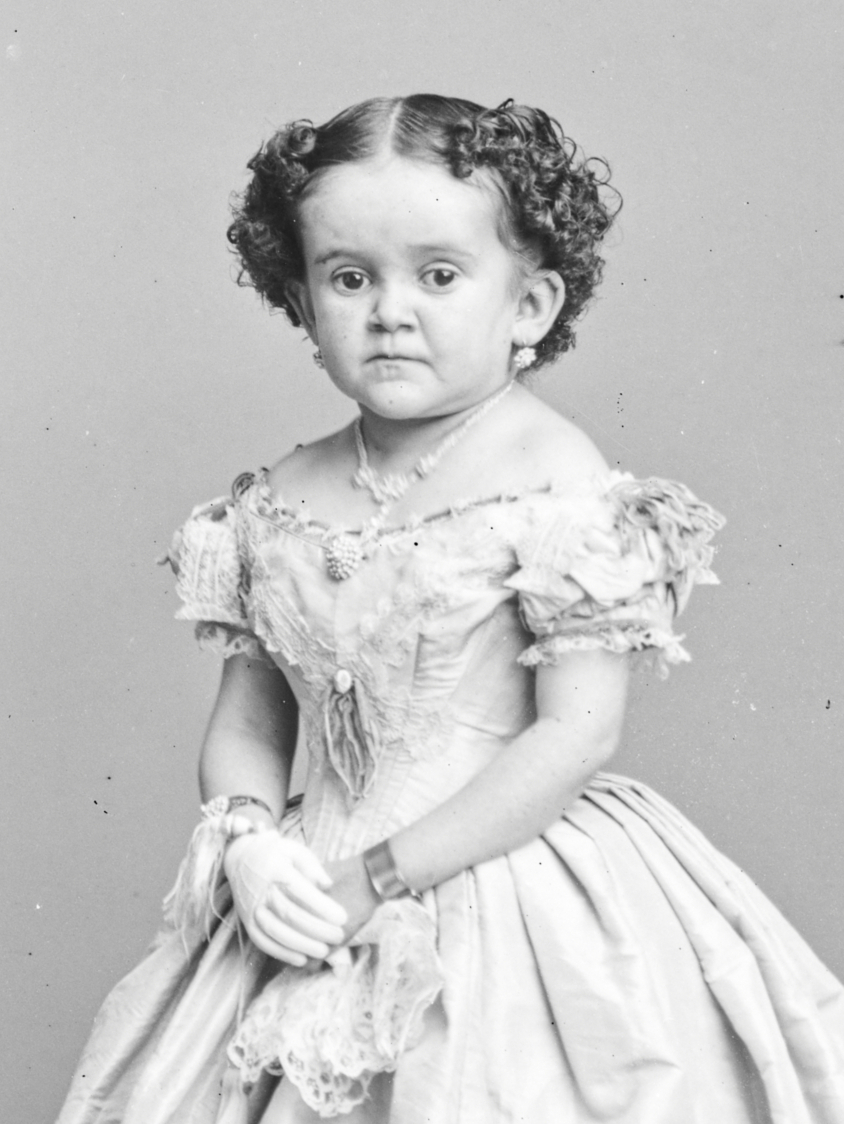
- Warren c. 1865
- Born: Huldah Pierce Warren Bump; June 2, 1849; Middleborough, Massachusetts, U.S.
- Died: July 23, 1878 (aged 29); Middleborough, Massachusetts, U.S.
- Resting place: Nemasket Hill Cemetery Middleborough, Massachusetts
- Spouse: Edmund Newell

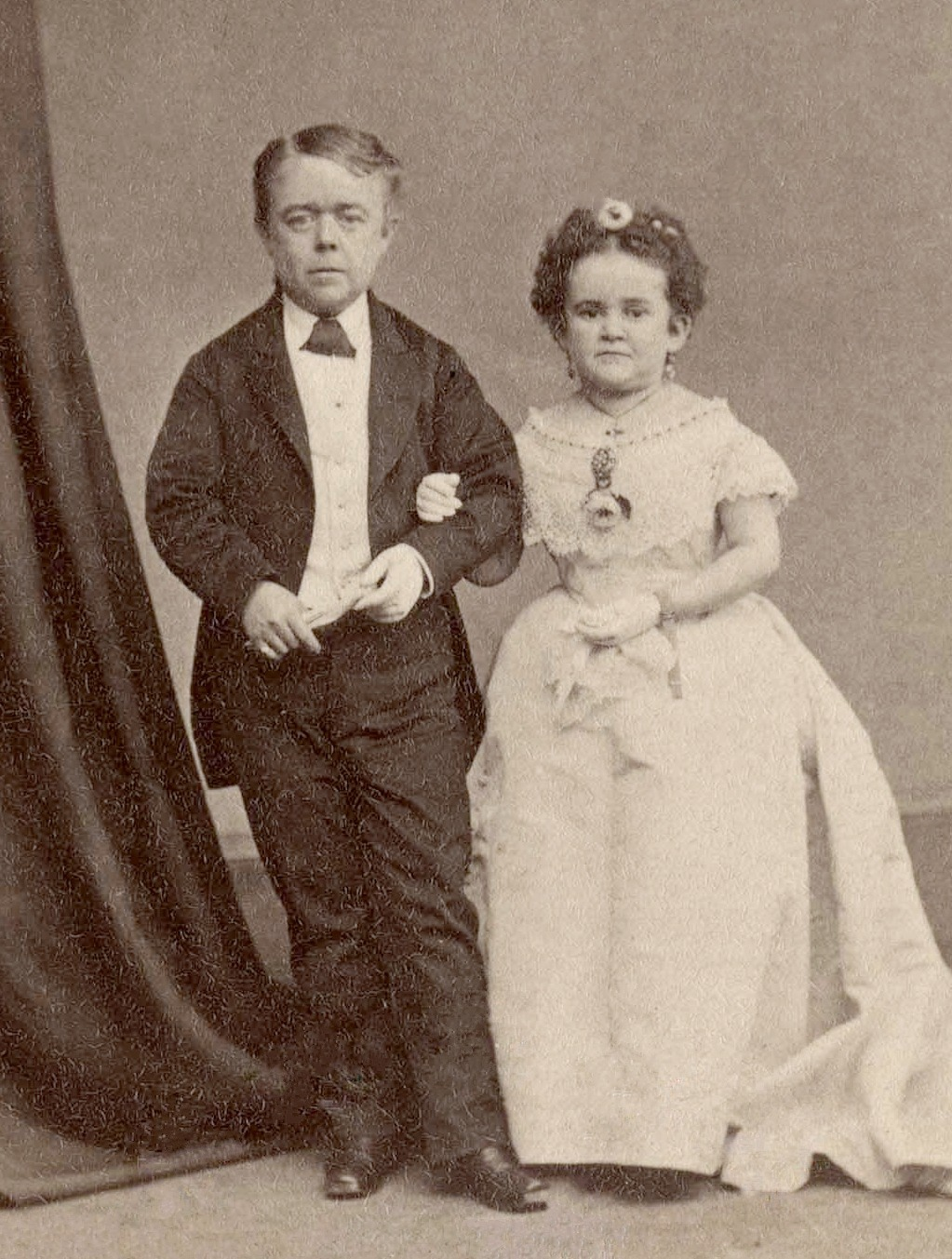
Warren with a fellow performer, Commodore Nutt, c. 1865

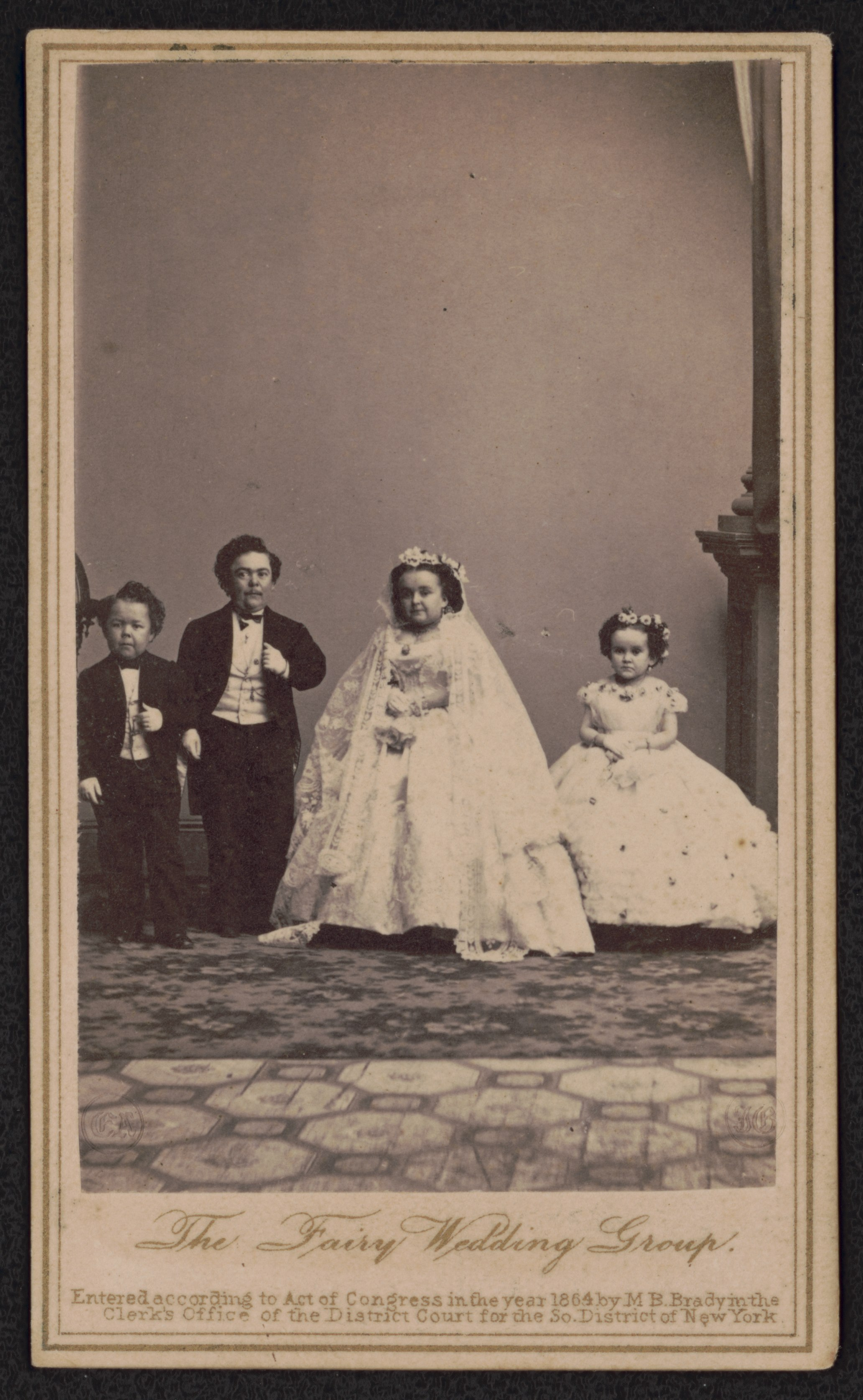
The Fairy Wedding group: Charles Stratton ("General Tom Thumb") and his bride Lavinia Warren, alongside her sister Minnie and George Washington Morrison Nutt ("Commodore Nutt"); entertainers associated with P.T. Barnum

Huldah Pierce Warren Bump (June 2, 1849 – July 23, 1878), better known as Minnie Warren, was an American proportionate dwarf and an entertainer associated with P. T. Barnum. Her sister Lavinia Warren was married to General Tom Thumb. They were very well known in 1860s America and their meeting with Abraham Lincoln was covered in the press.

== Early life ==
Warren was born in Middleborough, Massachusetts, the daughter of Huldah Pierce (Warren) and James Sullivan Bump. She was from a respected family whose roots went back to the beginning of the colony. Minnie and her sister had both been born at a normal birth weight but then stopped growing early in their lives. Their siblings were of a normal stature.

== Career ==
In addition to the public interest in her tiny stature, Minnie performed as a singer. She married Edmund Newell, who was also a dwarf and paid performer for P. T. Barnum.

== Death ==
Warren died from complications in childbirth on July 23, 1878. The baby, a girl who weighed 6 pounds, died a few hours later.

She is buried in Nemasket Hill Cemetery, Middleborough, Massachusetts.
