= John F. Antisdel =

American hotelier

- Born: John Francis Antisdel; June 13, 1829; Paris, New York
- Died: May 15, 1900 (aged 70); Detroit, Michigan
- Citizenship: United States
- Known for: Hotelier
- Board member of: Trustee of Kalamazoo College
- Spouse: Sarah Parshall

John Francis Antisdel (June 13, 1829 – May 15, 1900) was an American hotelier.

Antisdel was born in Paris, New York, but moved with his family at age six to a farm near Brooklyn, Michigan in 1835. In 1850, he moved to Detroit, Michigan and became a clerk in a hotel. In 1855, he married Sarah Parshall in Detroit. They had seven children, four of whom lived to adulthood.

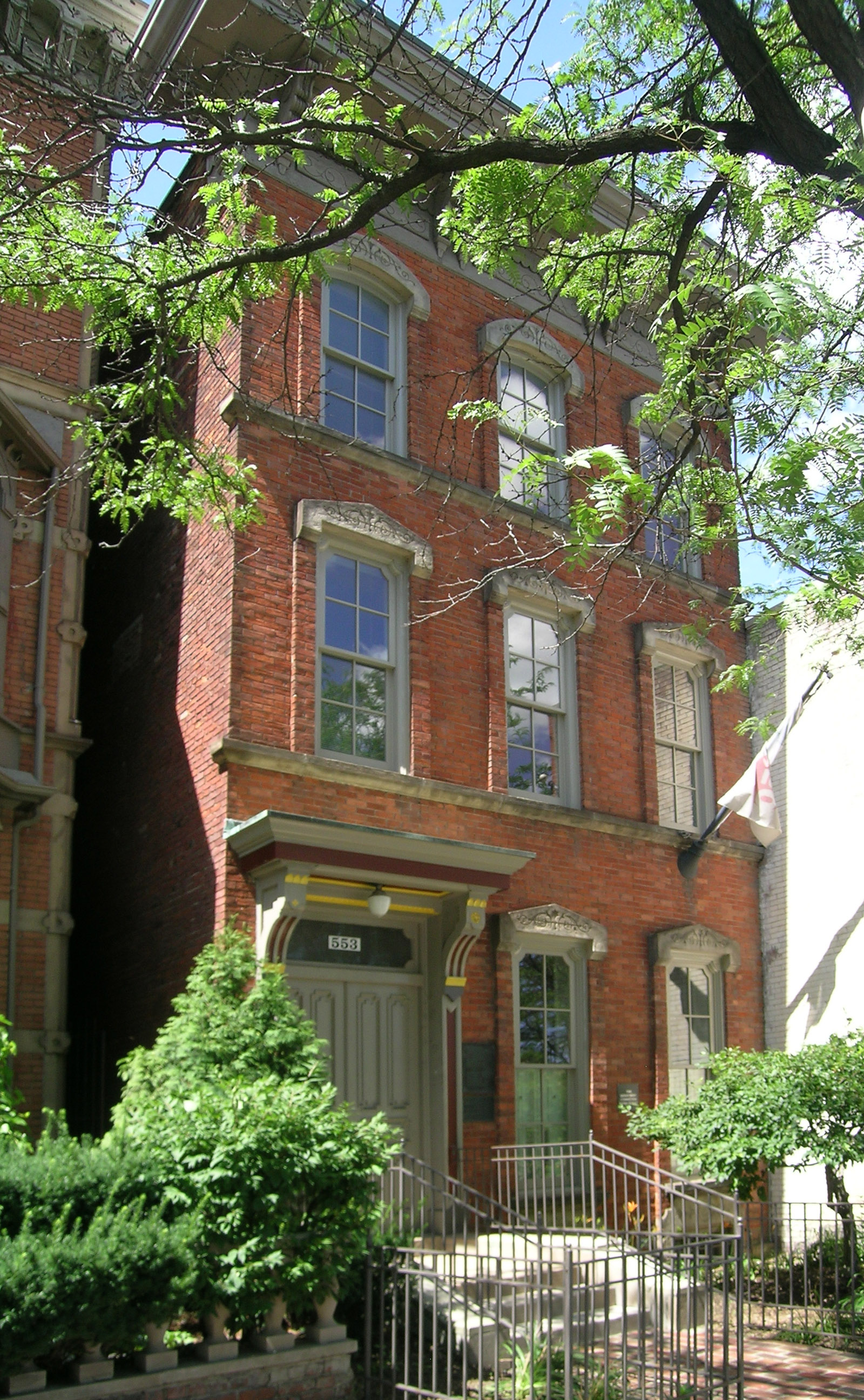
Beaubien House

In 1857, he formed a partnership with James Parshall and purchased the Finney Hotel at the southeast corner of Gratiot Avenue and Woodward Avenue in Detroit. The following year, Antisdel also became the owner of the Railroad Hotel, which was located on the site where the Detroit Opera House would later be built. Later, he sold the property on which the Railroad Hotel was located for $50,000 and bought the Blindberry Hotel at the corner of Michigan and Washington Avenues, which he renamed the Antisdel Hotel. The Antisdel Hotel stood until 1890 when it was torn down to make room for a more modern hotel.

Antisdel also took over the Biddle Hotel, which was one of the largest hotels in Michigan. Many of Detroit's "leading men" lived at the Antisdel Hotel. In 1872, Antisdel purchased the Beaubien House in Detroit, one of the oldest surviving houses in the city, and his family owned or rented the home until 1943.

Antisdel moved for a time to Milwaukee, Wisconsin, where he operated the Newhall House. He sustained losses in the Panic of 1873. After Newhall House burned down in 1883, he returned to Michigan and operated the Fraser House in Bay City, Michigan from 1884 to 1894. In 1894, he returned to Detroit and operated the Mettewas, a resort hotel in Kingsville, Ontario, until his death in 1900.
