= Lavinia Warren =

American circus performer (1841–1919)

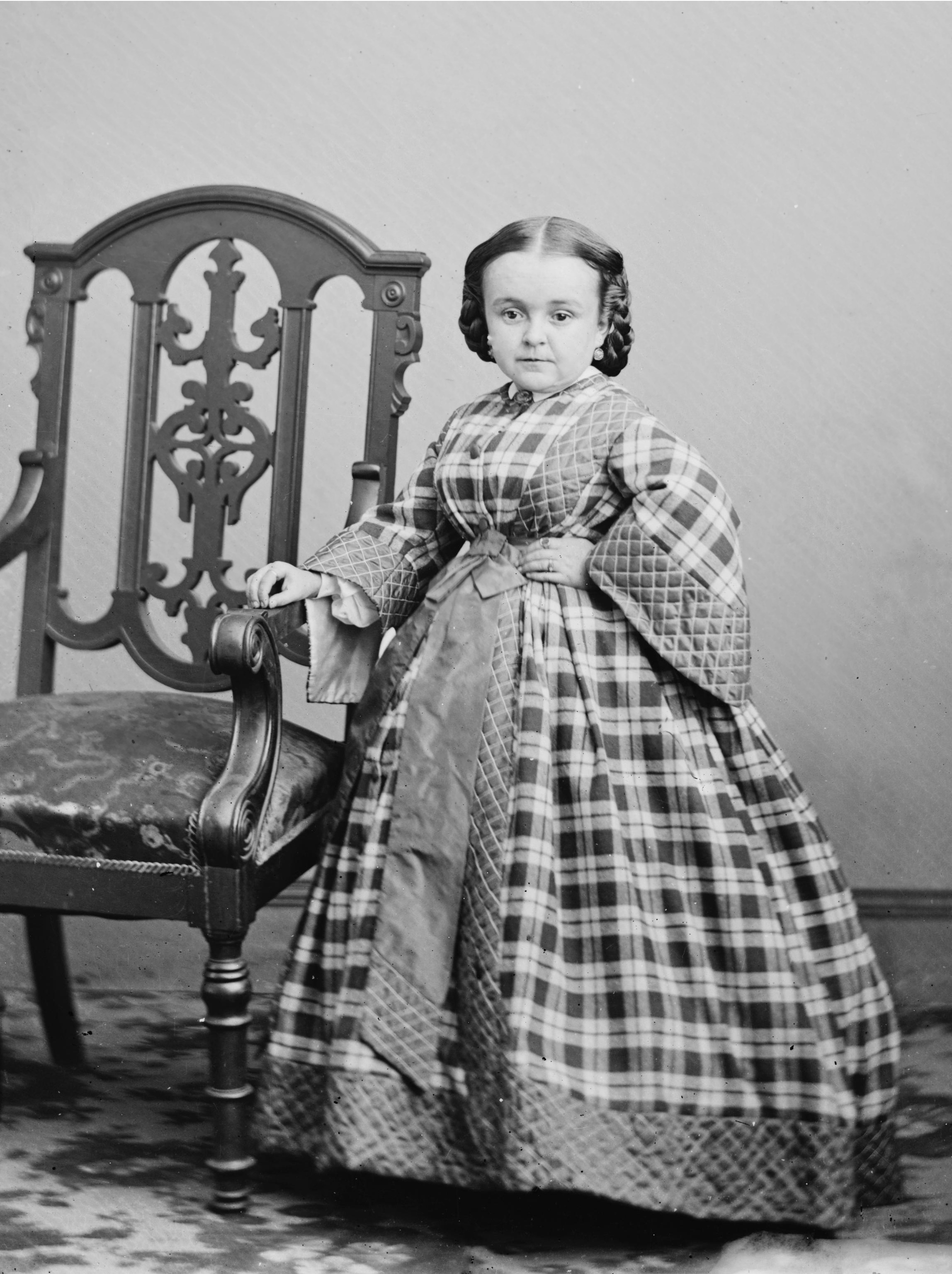
- Lavinia Warren c. 1860
- Born: Mercy Lavinia Warren Bump; October 31, 1841; Middleborough, Massachusetts, U.S.
- Died: November 25, 1919 (aged 78); Middleborough, Massachusetts, U.S.
- Resting place: Mountain Grove Cemetery, Bridgeport, Connecticut, U.S. 41.17189°N 73.22465°W
- Known for: Circus performer
- Height: 2 ft 8 in (81 cm)
- Spouses: Charles Stratton (m. 1863; died 1883) Count Primo Magri (m. 1885)

Mercy Lavinia Warren Stratton (née Bump; October 31, 1841 – November 25, 1919), known professionally as Lavinia Warren, was an American circus performer with proportionate dwarfism. She performed under the management of P. T. Barnum, toured in the United States and Europe, and appeared in the 1915 silent film The Lilliputians' Courtship. She was married to fellow performer Charles Sherwood Stratton, known professionally as General Tom Thumb, from 1863 until his death in 1883, and married Count Primo Magri in 1885.

== Early life ==
Warren was born as Mercy Lavinia Warren Bump at Middleborough, Massachusetts, the daughter of Huldah Pierce (Warren) and James Sullivan Bump. She was distantly descended from a French family named Bonpasse, from Governor Thomas Mayhew, and five Mayflower passengers: John Billington, Francis Cooke, Edward Doty, Stephen Hopkins, and Richard Warren – New England families which intermarried many times over.

== Medical condition ==
Lavinia Warren and her younger sister Minnie Warren had proportionate dwarfism, a condition caused by a disorder of the pituitary gland. Unlike many other forms of dwarfism, proportionate dwarfism results in a body that remains in normal proportion, differing primarily in overall size. During the nineteenth century, this appearance was considered especially desirable by sideshows and dime museums because performers retained the proportions of an average-sized adult in miniature.

At birth, Warren weighed 6 pounds (2.7 kg). As an adult, she stood 2 feet 8 inches (81 cm) tall.

== Performing career ==
After a successful career as a well-respected school teacher, which began at age 16, Lavinia went to work as a miniature dancing chanteuse upon a Mississippi showboat owned by a cousin. She enjoyed performing, learned of Charles Stratton's (known as Tom Thumb) success, alongside the rest of the nation, and pursued a performing career as an adult. Under the management of showman P. T. Barnum, she changed her name from Mercy Lavinia Bump to Lavinia Warren, the stage name she had previously used while performing on the Mississippi River.

In February 1872 she visited England with Stratton, whom she had married, her sister and George Nutt, known as Commodore Nutt. They were photographed in Stonehouse, Plymouth, and all four signed the photograph.

== Personal life ==
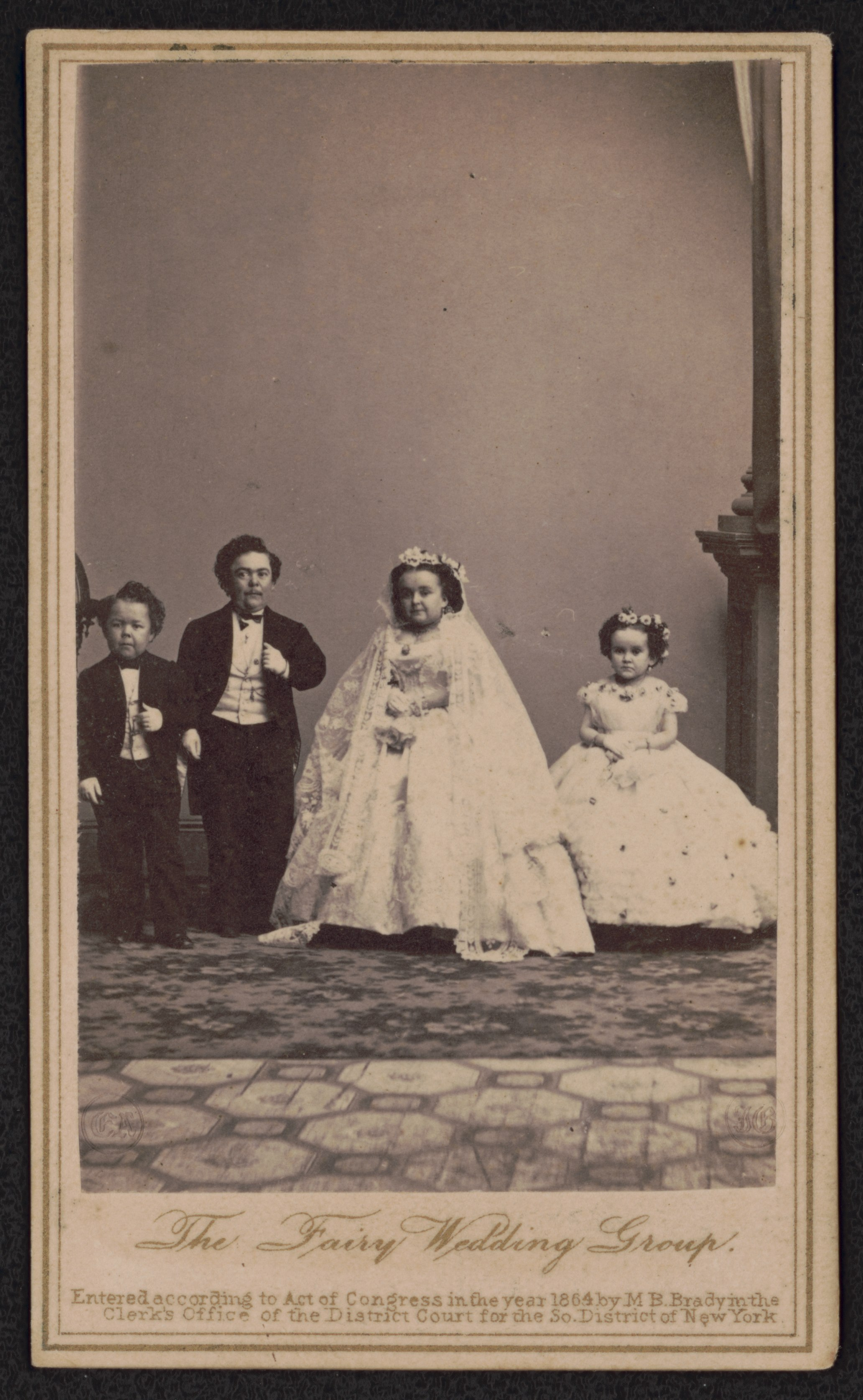
The Fairy Wedding (Note: Charles Stratton ("General Tom Thumb") and his bride Lavinia Warren, alongside her sister Minnie and George Washington Morrison Nutt ("Commodore Nutt"); entertainers associated with P.T. Barnum.)

Though their fame afforded Warren and Stratton a life of luxury, it came with downsides. They were presented as childlike to the public by P.T. Barnum. This was an advertising strategy to make the audience feel sympathetic for them in order to sell more tickets. Though they were some of the most famous people in America at the time, due to the way they were presented, people treated them like children.

Many people Warren met wanted to pet her and hold her. She wrote in her autobiography "It seemed impossible, to make people understand at first that I was not a child; that, being a woman, I had the womanly instinct of shrinking from a form of familiarity which in the case of a child of my size would have been as natural as it was permissible."

Even though Warren was not extremely fond of how she was viewed by the public, she still continued to perform. Since her life revolved around her presence in the media, she once said "I belong to the public."

Several years later on January 10, 1883, Lavinia Warren and her husband stayed at Newhall House in Milwaukee, Wisconsin on the day it caught fire. They were narrowly rescued by their friend and manager, Sylvester Bleeker, from what had been referred to as "one of the worst hotel fires in American history."

== Marriage and children ==
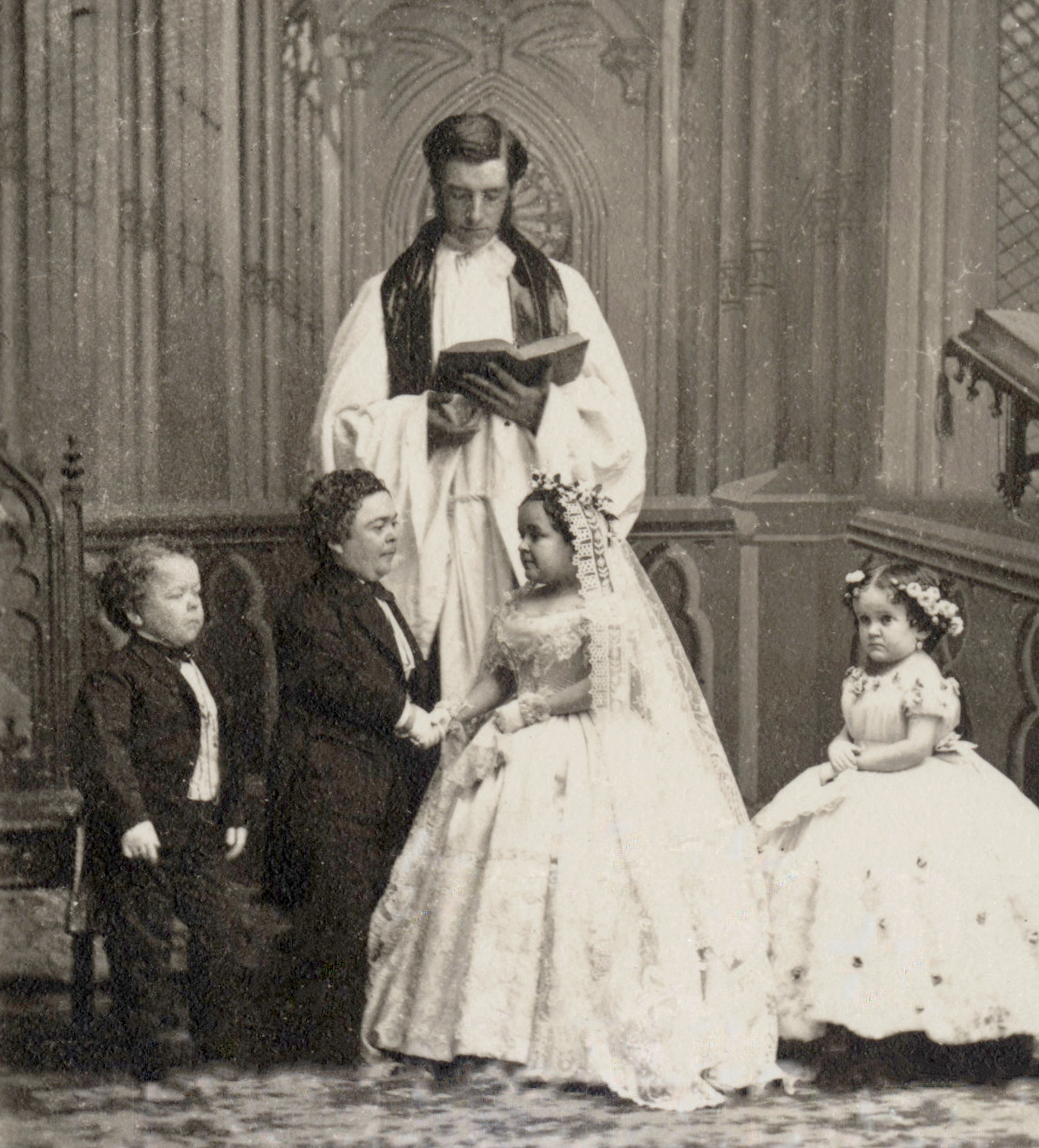
Wedding photo (Note: From left to right: George Washington Morrison Nutt, Charles Stratton, Lavinia Warren, Minnie Warren)

At the age of 21, while performing at Barnum's American Museum in New York City, Warren met Stratton. She was also pursued by fellow performer George Washington Morrison Nutt, known professionally as Commodore Nutt, but she chose Stratton.

Warren and Stratton were married on February 10, 1863, at Grace Episcopal Church in New York City. Their wedding became one of the biggest social events in nineteenth-century New York. At the reception, held at the Metropolitan Hotel, the newlyweds greeted guests from atop a grand piano while Warren's sister, Minnie Warren, served as bridesmaid. Showman P. T. Barnum sold reception tickets for $75 each (equivalent to about equivalent to $1,961 in 2025) to the first 5,000 applicants. The marriage brought Warren even greater fame. She and Stratton were later received at the White House by President Abraham Lincoln and First Lady Mary Todd Lincoln, and Tiffany & Co. presented the couple with a silver coach. During their 20-year marriage, they amassed a fortune.

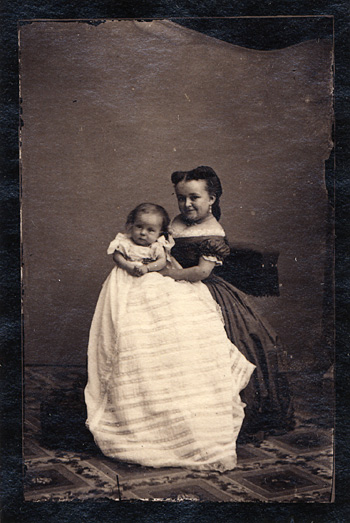
The purported baby of Lavinia Stratton and her husband General Tom Thumb

Although Barnum publicized a purported infant as the couple's child, Warren and Stratton had no biological children.

After 20 years of marriage, Stratton died of a stroke on July 15, 1883. Warren, then 41, considered retiring from public life but ultimately chose to continue performing. Two years later, at the age of 43, she married Magri. The couple later operated a well-known roadside stand in Middleborough, Massachusetts. At the age of 73, Warren appeared alongside her second husband in the 1915 silent film The Lilliputians' Courtship.

== Death ==
Warren died on November 25, 1919, at the age of 78. She is buried next to her first husband with a simple gravestone that reads: "His Wife".

== See also ==
- Middleborough Historical Museum, which exhibits a large collection of Lavinia Warren memorabilia
