= Ada Crogman Franklin =

American playwright and journalist (1886–1983)

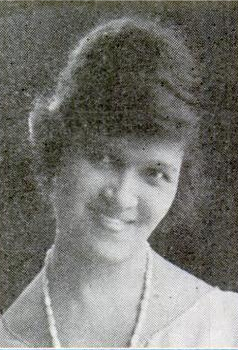
- Ada Crogman, from a 1924 publication.
- Born: 1886; Atlanta, Georgia
- Died: December 24, 1983 (aged 96–97); Kansas City, Missouri
- Occupations: Newspaper publisher, playwright, educator, journalist
- Parent: William H. Crogman

Ada Crogman Franklin (1886 – December 24, 1983) was an American playwright, journalist, educator, and publisher of The Kansas City Call newspaper from 1955 to 1983.

== Early life and education ==
Ada Crogman was born in Atlanta, Georgia, the daughter of William H. Crogman and Lavinia Mott Crogman. Her father was born on Saint Martin, in the Danish West Indies. She graduated from Clark Atlanta University, where her father was the president and professor of Latin and Greek. She pursued further studies in oratory at Emerson College in Massachusetts.

The Crogman family were active in education. Her sister Charlotte was a missionary, writer and editor; she married sociologist, clergyman and college president Richard R. Wright Jr. Another sister, Edith, married Robert Nathaniel Brooks, a clergyman, educator, and college president. Charlotte's daughter Ruth Wright Hayre was a philanthropist and school superintendent in Philadelphia.

== Career ==
Crogman taught at Alabama State College and Tennessee State University as a young woman. As dramatics specialist for the National Playground and Recreation Association and the Community Service League Inc., she wrote a popular musical pageant, Milestones of a Race, and traveled to the cities where it was presented by local theatre groups. Another pageant by Franklin was titled Revel of the Seasons.

Crogman created and also wrote for The Kansas City Call, the newspaper her husband founded and published. After 1955, she was publisher of the paper, with Lucile Bluford as editor. "She was the true matriarch of black journalism in America," commented publisher Carlton Goodlett, on the occasion of Franklin's death.

== Personal life ==
Ada Crogman married newspaper publisher Chester Arthur Franklin in 1925. They lived in Kansas City, Missouri. She was widowed in 1955. She died in 1983, in her late nineties. Her papers are in the Black Archives of Mid-America in Kansas City.
