= Plymouth and Middleborough Railroad =

Defunct railroad line

Map

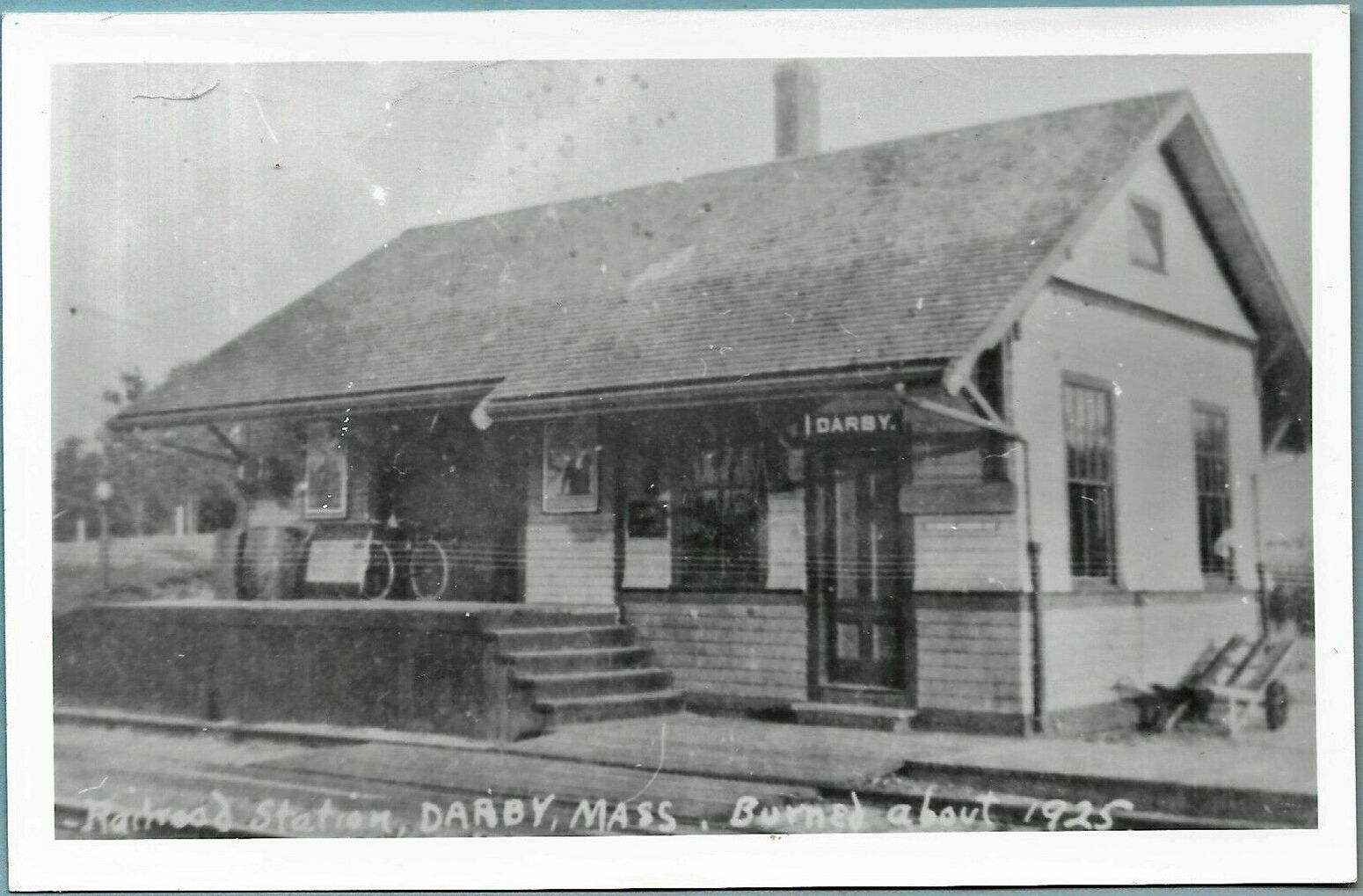
Darby station around 1905

The Plymouth and Middleborough Railroad was a railroad line between the towns of Middleborough and Plymouth, Massachusetts. It was in service from 1882 to 1939.

== History ==
Incorporated in 1890, the 15-mile (24 km) line opened on November 30, 1892. The next day, it was leased to the Old Colony Railroad for 99 years. Passenger service began on December 5, 1892. In 1893, it became part of the New York, New Haven and Hartford Railroad as part of the lease of the entire Old Colony Railroad network.

Passenger service, never more than a few trips per day, was often operated as Providence–Plymouth or Taunton–Plymouth trains. After a competing bus line opened in 1925, passenger service ended in 1927. Beginning in early 1928, freight service was suspended for the winter after the end of the October–December cranberry season.

Freight service between North Carver and Plymouth was discontinued in 1934, and that section of the line was abandoned in 1937. The remainder of the line was abandoned in early 1939 with no objections from shippers.

== Stations ==
Municipality	Station	Miles (km)	Notes
Middleborough	Middleborough	0 (0)	Junction with Middleborough Main Line, Middleborough–Taunton line, and Middleborough–Fall River line
Middleborough	Namasket (Putnams)	3.1 (5.0)	
Middleborough	East Middleborough (Mt. Carmel)	5.4 (8.7)	
Carver	North Carver	7.5 (12.1)	
Plymouth	Darby	10.8 (17.4)	Next to Darby Pond in West Plymouth
Plymouth	Plymouth	15.7 (25.3)	Junction with Old Colony Railroad main line
