= Tell Them We Are Rising =

Scholarship program

Tell Them We Are Rising (TTWAR) was a program created by Ruth Wright Hayre in 1988. In the program, Hayre offered to fund the college education of 116 selected children if they stayed in school and got into college. The program was somewhat successful, resulting in decreased drop-out rates and increased the number of students on an honor roll.

== Background ==
Ruth Wright Hayre was an American educator in Philadelphia public schools. She was the first African American to teach full-time in the district and work as principal of a high school. She retired from teaching in 1976 or 1978.

Her grandfather, Richard R. Wright, who was both founder and president of Georgia State College, had first become well known when he was twelve years old in Atlanta, Georgia and told the visiting general Oliver Otis Howard to "tell 'em we're rising". The American poet and abolitionist John Greenleaf Whittier wrote the poem "Howard at Atlanta" on the event.

== Program ==
Tell Them We Are Rising was established in 1988 when Hayre offered to fund the college education of 116 selected children if they stayed in school and got into college. The students selected were the sixth grade class at Kenderton Elementary School and Wright Elementary School, the latter of which had been named after Hayre's father. Hayre announced TTWAR at the school's graduation ceremonies in June. It provided for tutoring and other programs of mentor-ship that were aimed at keeping "the Risers' minds on school, and away from the streets that can deter youth from achieving". TTWAR was administered by the Temple University Education Department. Participating students were known as "risers". Hayre said of the program: "Let me make something clear: I am not naive. This program was no altruistic exercise on my part. My motivation stemmed in part from an intellectual curiosity born out of a life spent in education. I wanted to know to what extent this kind of intervention would alter the 'predictable' path of at least half of my kids".

The program was formally ended on June 24, 1994. Hayre concluded that she may have underestimated obstacles that the students faced. TTWAR resulted in sixty students graduating from high school, thirty-nine attending either two or four-year colleges, and twelve entering technical schools. Temple University later studied the program and determined that the program had increased the numbers of students on an honor roll and decreased dropouts. The Philadelphia Tribune reported in 2002 that the sixth student included in the program had graduated from college, noting that they were the "last".

== Book ==
In June 1997 she published Tell Them We Are Rising, an autobiographical memoir that was co-written with Alexis Moore Bruton. The book covered TTWAR as well as other parts of Hayre's life, focusing the second half on the program. The Washington Post generally received the memoir well, appreciating Hayre's "selfless, plain-spoken tone" but wishing that Hayre wrote more about her life "beyond education." Publishers Weekly also wished for more detail on life stories but praised its presentation of TTWAR, concluding that the book was "highly recommended."
