= William H. Crogman =

Dutch Caribbean and American educator, classicist scholar (1841–1931)

William Henry Crogman
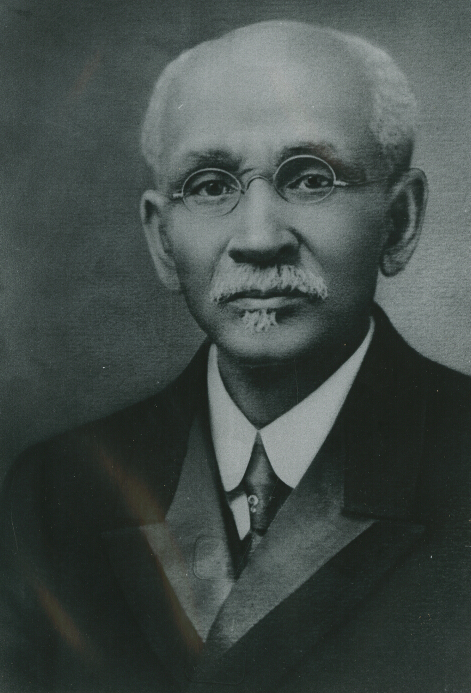

11th President of Clark University
- In office 1903–1910
- Preceded by: Charles M. Melden
- Succeeded by: G.E. Idleman

Personal details
- Born: May 5, 1841 Philipsburg, Sint Maarten, Dutch Caribbean (now Kingdom of the Netherlands)
- Died: October 16, 1931 (aged 90) Kansas City, Missouri, United States
- Spouse: Lavina Mott (m. 1878–?)
- Children: 8
- Education: Atlanta University
- Occupation: Professor
- Known for: Classicist

William Henry Crogman (May 5, 1841 – October 16, 1931) was a Dutch Caribbean and American pioneering educator and classicist at Clark University of Atlanta in the United States. The William H. Crogman School in Atlanta is named for him. He was the 11th president of Clark College (now known as Clark Atlanta University).

== Early life and education ==
William Henry Crogman was born May 5, 1841, in Philipsburg, Sint Maarten, an island in the Dutch Caribbean. He was orphaned at the age of 12, and moved to the United States at the age of 14 with a man named B. L. Boomer. He attended schools in Massachusetts and had the chance to travel the world, visiting ports in Asia, Europe, Australia, and South America.

After the American Civil War he entered Pierce Academy in Middleborough, Massachusetts, led by John Whipple Potter Jenks. He finished his study, and in 1870, started teaching at Claflin University in Orangeburg, South Carolina. After three years of teaching, in 1873, he enrolled at Atlanta University and in 1876 graduated as a part of the first class of the school. He then took a position at Clark University of Atlanta where he became professor of Greek and Latin. He was the first person to receive a Doctor of Letters from Atlanta University, which was awarded as an honorary degree. He also received an honorary Doctor of Laws.

== Career ==
He was a gifted orator and gave numerous important speeches, including a speech before the American Missionary Association at Chicago and the Freedmen's Aid Society of the Methodist Episcopal church at Ocean Grove, New Jersey, in the early 1880s. In 1883, he gave two speeches from Henry Ward Beecher's pulpit at Plymouth Church in Brooklyn, New York, which were printed in pamphlet form.

In the mid 1880s, he was a delegate to the National Association of Teachers convention in Madison, Wisconsin, and as a layman represented the Savannah Conference in the General Conference of the Methodist Episcopal church. In 1884, he was elected secretary of the conference. He was also appointed a delegate to the Ecumenical Council of Methodism in London. In 1892, the General Conference selected him to be a member of a University Senate chosen by the bishops to determine the minimum requirements for the baccalaureate degree from associated schools.

He was highly respected and beloved at Clark University, and worked for equality in education and civil rights. Rather than ride segregated streetcars, he walked the several miles between his home and the campus. He was secretary of the Board of Trustees at Clark for many years. From 1903 to 1910, he was president at the school.

In 1895, he was a driving force behind the Negro exhibit at the Cotton Exposition in Atlanta and was Chief Exposition Commissioner for African Americans from Georgia. He was also a trustee at the Gammon Theological Seminary He was a participant in the March 5, 1897, meeting to celebrate the memory of Frederick Douglass which founded the American Negro Academy led by Alexander Crummell.

== Later life, death, and legacy ==
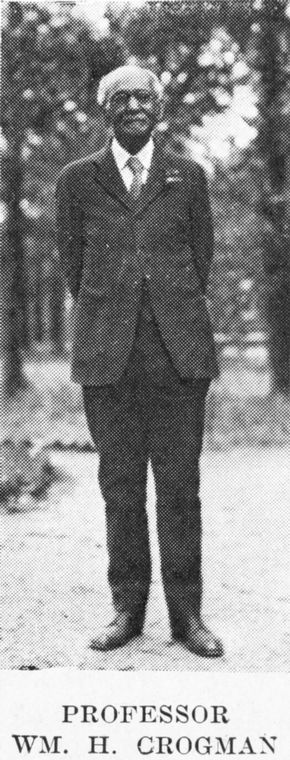
Professor William H. Crogman in 1922

Crogman retired in 1921 and was awarded a lifetime pension by the Carnegie Foundation.

He was married in 1878 to a woman named Lavina Mott (or Mavinid Mott). Together they had 8 children. When he retired, he moved to Philadelphia and lived with his daughter, Lottie Crogman Wright. Wright was the wife of Richard Wright, president of Wilberforce University in Ohio. He had two other daughters, Edith and Ada. Crogman died in Kansas City, Missouri, on October 16, 1931, followed in a few days by his wife. He was buried in Atlanta.

Clark also erected the gothic Crogman Chapel in his honor. The William H. Krogman Cottage is named after him.

== Works ==
- Crogman, W. H. (1884) Negro Education: Its Helps and Hindrances
- Crogman, William Henry. Talks for the Times. Press of Franklin Printing & Publishing Company, 1896.
