= J. W. P. Jenks =

Zoologist, author, and museum collection curator

John Whipple Potter "J. W. P." Jenks (May 1, 1819–1894) was an American school principal, zoologist, taxidermy collector, and museum curator. He taught in the South for a few years before marrying into a prominent family and heading Pierce Academy in Middleborough, Massachusetts. After he retired from there he returned to his alma mater, Brown University, established a natural history museum there and taught zoology.

He was born in West Boylston, Massachusetts to Dr. Nicholas Jenks and Betsey née Potter Jenks.For alnost three decades he served as principal of Pierce Academy in Middleborough, Massachusetts.

Report on the food of the robin, readable pdf

He studied the diet of robins by examining the contents of their gizzards at different times of day, locations, and months.

Jenks' book Huntings in Florida recounts his at times arduous expedition to Florida shooting birds, collecting eggs, hunting game, and encountering wildlife including the Carolina parakeet, sawfish, wild cats, mosquitoes, and many gators.

Jenks revised Joel Dorman Steele's Fourteen Weeks in Zoology published in 1869 into the book Popular Zoology published in 1887. John Cassin acquired some of his collection. Jenks's "lost" museum was recreated and put on display at Brown University.

== Writings ==
- Hunting in Florida in 1874
- "English History" in Short Stories
- Autobiography, unpublished 1891 manuscript
- Popular Zoology, co-author
- ”Report on the food of the Robin”
