= Howard at Atlanta =

1868 poem by John Greanleaf Whittier

"Howard at Atlanta" is an 1868 poem by John Greenleaf Whittier. Whittier based his poem on an interaction between Oliver Otis Howard and Richard R. Wright, who was twelve years old at the time, when Wright told Howard to "tell 'em we're rising".

== Background ==
John Greenleaf Whittier based the poem on an interaction between Oliver Otis Howard, at the time a general in the Union Army, and Richard R. Wright, a young Black man. Howard was visiting a grammar school called the "Storrs School" in autumn 1868. He later wrote in his autobiography that he spoke to the students and then asked them "if anyone had a message" for schoolchildren in the northern United States. Wright, described as wearing "a clean white jacket" and being twelve years old, rose and said "tell them we are rising."

== Writing and publication ==
Whittier heard the story from George W. Childs and centered his poem around the interaction. He phrased Wright's reply: "Massa / Tell 'em we're rising!" Steve Courtney also highlights the lines:

The one curse of the races
Held both in tether:
They are rising, — all are rising,
The black and white together!

"Howard at Atlanta" was published in 1868.

== Reception and analysis ==
Wright wrote Whittier in March 1869, criticizing him for using the word "massa", noting that "I have given up that word.” The phrase "we are rising" became very popular. Whittier references the "Vision of the Valley of Dry Bones" passage from the Bible in the poem, equating the freeing of the slaves to "a resurrection of the dry bones". He describes Atlanta as "rising phoenixlike out of the ashes of war". Steve Courtney considers the poem to be an "optimistic view of the South's future, free from slavery." Another critic highlighted the poem as epitomizing Whittier's vision for "racial harmony and equality."

W. E. B. Du Bois included the poem in chapter five of Souls of Black Folk. The book Habitations of the Veil argues that Whittier uses the poem to "comment upon the moral fitness of the newly freed slaves for citizenry", writing that instead of Howard himself being the "hero", it is Wright—despite the fact that he is never mentioned by name. It continues to say that the incident made Wright famous; he later capitalized on the fame and became president of Georgia State Industrial College for Colored Youth. The book concludes that the poem is "neither regular nor remarkable [for Whittier]" and notes that it includes lines that could be understood as being condescending, such as "the little black people". Ruth Wright Hayre, the granddaughter of Wright, later created Tell Them We Are Rising, a philanthropic endeavor named after the interaction.
