= Pierce Academy =

Closed school in Massachusetts

Peirce Academy
- Middleborough, Massachusetts, U.S.

Information
- Established: 1808
- Closed: 1880
- Principal: John Whipple Potter Jenks (1842-1871)

Peirce Academy (1808–1880) was a college preparatory school in Middleborough, Massachusetts. The school was founded in 1808, fell into decline in 1872 when Middleborough High School opened, had only 12 students in 1876, and closed in 1880. The building was later used for the YMCA and G.A.R.

A deal was proposed for the school to provide high school education for up to 50 Middleborough students. From 1842 to 1871, John Whipple Potter Jenks was principal.

== Alumni ==
- William Crogman
- Major General Leonard Wood
