= Middleborough Historical Museum =

Local historical museum in Massachusetts, US

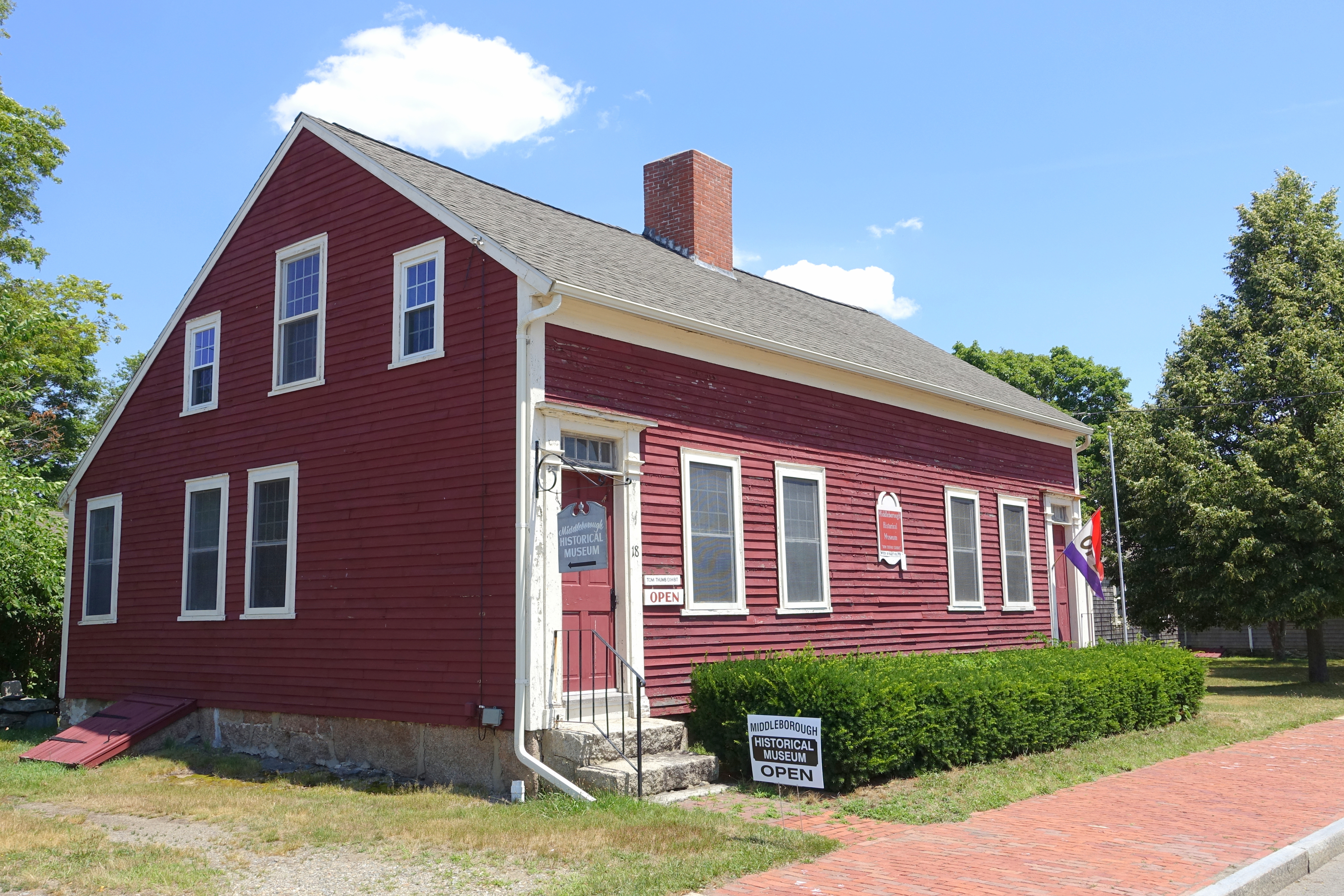
- Established: 1961
- Location: 18 Jackson Street; Middleborough, Massachusetts
- Coordinates: 41.8929°N 70.9063°W
- Type: Local museum
- Owner: Middleborough Historical Association
- Website: middleboroughhistoricalassociation.org

The Middleborough Historical Museum is a museum located at 18 Jackson Street, Middleborough, Massachusetts, and maintained by the Middleboro Historical Association. It is sometimes known as the Tom Thumb Museum for its extensive holdings of personal items from General Tom Thumb and his wife Lavinia Warren, who lived in the nearby Tom Thumb House. The museum was founded in 1961, and currently comprises 7 buildings as follows:

Building	Exterior	Contents
Mill House #1, c. 1820		Entry, General and Mrs. Tom Thumb Collection, Art Gallery, Furniture Room
Mill House #2, c. 1820		P. H. Peirce General Store, Deborah Samson Military Room, Toy Room, Kitchen, other rooms depicting social life
Blacksmith Shop, recent construction		Wheelwright, Agricultural Tools, Ice Harvesting, Charcoaling, Cranberry Industry
Judge Wood Law Office, 1794		Early Law Office, Lawrence B. Romaine Memorial Library
Whistle House, c. 1800s		1854 Hand Tub Fire Engine, 1934 Maxim Motors Fire Engine
Carriage House, recent construction		Transportation Vehicles, Antique Signs
Sproat Tavern Necessary		Five Seat Outhouse

== See also ==
- List of historical societies in Massachusetts

== Sources ==
- Middleborough Historical Association
- Tom Thumb Museum
- Middleborough Historical Museum brochure
- Roadside America entry
