= Glenn Tufts =

Glenn A. Tufts (born December 2, 1954, in Middleboro, Massachusetts) is currently a scout for the San Francisco Giants. Previously, he played professionally and managed in the minor leagues.

== Playing career ==
Prior to playing professionally, Tufts attended Bridgewater-Raynham High School. He was drafted in the first round, fifth overall, by the Cleveland Indians in the 1973 amateur draft.

Tufts began his professional career in 1973, playing for the GCL Indians. In 51 games with them, he batted .194. He missed all of 1974 following a car accident, and in 1975 he hit .270 in 102 games for the San Jose Bees. He split the 1976 season between the Bees and Williamsport Tomahawks, hitting a combined .249 in 62 games. 1977 ended up being his final professional season playing baseball. In 84 games for the Waterloo Indians and Jersey City Indians, he hit only .234.

Overall, Tufts hit .240 in 299 minor league games, over four seasons.

== Post-playing career ==
From 1986 to 1993, he was the head coach for Bridgewater State College. In 1992, Tufts managed the Hyannis Mets, a collegiate summer baseball team in the prestigious Cape Cod Baseball League. He was hired as a minor league instructor by the Giants in 1994, coaching the Clinton LumberKings. He managed for three seasons, from 1995 to 1997, and in 1997 he became a scout as well.

=== Year-By-Year Minor League Managerial Record ===
Year	Team	League	Record	Finish	Organization	Playoffs	Notes
1995	Bellingham Giants	Northwest League	43-33	2nd	San Francisco Giants	Lost League Finals	
1996	Burlington Bees	Midwest League	65-73	11th	San Francisco Giants		
1997	Bakersfield Blaze	California League	33-43	--	San Francisco Giants		replaced by Keith Bodie on June 25
