= Ruth Wright Hayre =

American educator (1910–1998)

- Hayre, c. 1956
- Born: October 26, 1910; Atlanta, Georgia, US
- Died: January 30, 1998 (aged 87); Philadelphia, Pennsylvania
- Known for: American educator, "tell them we are rising" program

Ruth Wright Hayre (October 26, 1910 – January 30, 1998) was an American educator and administrator based chiefly in Philadelphia public schools in Pennsylvania. In 1946 she was the first African American to teach full-time at a high school in the district and, in the late 1950s, the first to be promoted to principal of a high school. After she retired, she was appointed to the Philadelphia Board of Education. In 1991 Hayre was chosen as its first female president, serving through 1992.

== Early life ==
She was born Ruth Wright on October 26, 1910, in Atlanta, Georgia, to Charlotte (Crogman) Wright and Richard R. Wright Jr. In 1911 her father was the first African American to earn a PhD in sociology in an organized program, as this was a new field; he earned it at the University of Pennsylvania. Her family settled in West Philadelphia. Her paternal grandfather was Richard R. Wright, also a teacher and educator. Wright was appointed in 1891 as founding president of Georgia State College, a historically black college (HBCU), which he developed for three decades, serving as president until 1921. It was authorized in 1890 by the state legislature as a public land-grant school for blacks. He and his wife emphasized education for their children. Other members of her extended family were also well-educated.

In Philadelphia, Hayre attended schools in the city that had predominately white students. She graduated with honors from West Philadelphia High School for Girls when she was fifteen. She followed her father to study at University of Pennsylvania; in 1930 or 1931, she graduated from the University of Pennsylvania with a master's degree in education. Hayre had attended Pennsylvania on a scholarship.

== Teaching career ==
Initially unable to find a position in Philadelphia schools, she gained work in Arkansas, where she taught at Arkansas State College for Negros, a public HBCU. In 1933 Hayre moved to Dayton, Ohio, where she taught at Dalton High School. Three years later she moved to Washington, D.C., where she taught at the Armstrong Industrial High School. While in D.C., she married Talmadge Hayre in 1937.

The couple moved to Philadelphia two years later when her husband was hired at Cheyney State College. Hayre earned a PhD at Pennsylvania (1949). She was hired to teach at Sulzberger Junior High School in Philadelphia. At the time she was the second Black employee in the district.

In 1946 Hayre became the first Black high school teacher in the city when she moved to William Penn High School for Girls. She was promoted to vice principal in 1952 or 1953, and principal several years later; she was the first African-American principal in the city. At the school, Hayre co-created "WINGS", a program aimed at "encouraging students to discover their talents".

In 1963 Hayre was promoted to a higher administrator position, to supervise a district of the city's public educational system. While she led the district, Hayre worked to upgrade its facilities and advocated for "more inclusion of black history" in the curriculum. She retired from teaching in 1976 or 1978.

On December 2, 1983, she was selected for the Philadelphia Board of Education. She served as president from 1990 to 1992, the first woman to hold this position on the Board. Hayre helped the board respond to the AIDS epidemic, increasing sex education and instituting the distribution of condoms to prevent transmission of disease.

== Retirement and death ==
In 1988, Hayre created a program providing funding for the college education of 116 or 119 Black children. The program was named "Tell Them We Are Rising" after a line in "Howard at Atlanta", a John Greenleaf Whittier poem, that was based on Hayre's grandfather Wright's life.

The program offered to fund the college education of the selected children if they stayed in school and got into college. It also provided for tutoring and other programs of mentorship, so that they could complete their high school degrees. The year after she announced the program, the University of Pennsylvania granted Hayre an honorary LLD.

In 1997 Hayre published Tell Them We Are Rising, an autobiographical memoir co-written with Alexis Moore Bruton. The "Rising" program resulted in sixty students graduating from high school: of these thirty-nine attended either two or four-year colleges, and twelve entered technical schools. Temple University later studied the program. It determined that students enrolled in it increased their numbers on an honor roll and the number of dropouts from high school decreased.

== Death and legacy ==
Hayre died in Philadelphia, Pennsylvania on January 30, 1998.

A mural was created in her memory and unveiled in 2018 at a Philadelphia elementary school. The Ruth Wright Hayre scholarship was also created in her memory, and provides financial support to college-bound students.
