= Tom Thumb House (Middleborough, Massachusetts) =

Historic house in Massachusetts, United States

- U.S. National Register of Historic Places
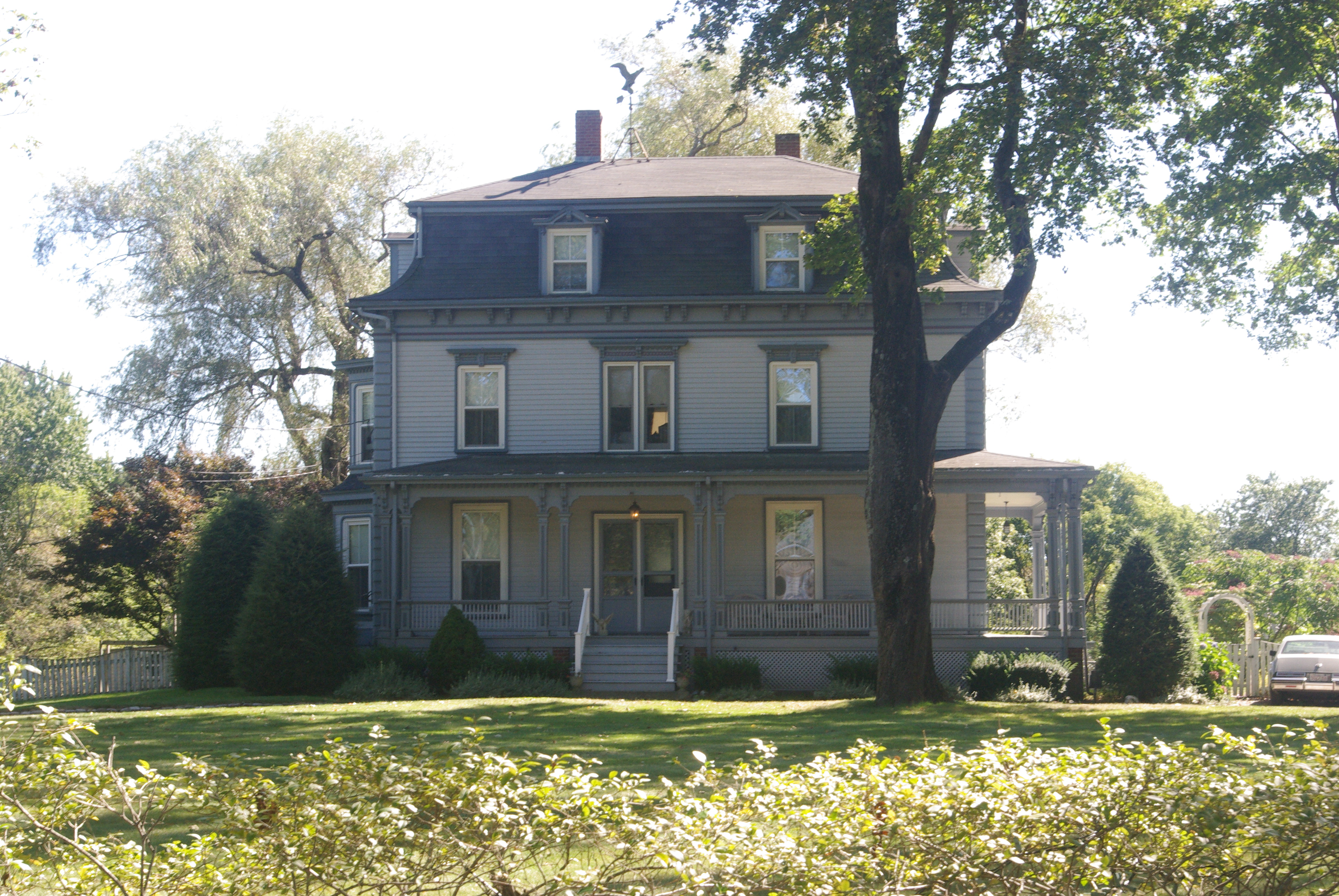

- Location within Massachusetts Location within the United States
- Location: 351 Plymouth Street, Middleborough, Massachusetts
- Coordinates: 41°55′16″N 70°55′8″W
- Architectural style: Second Empire, Italianate
- NRHP reference No.: 93000298
- Added to NRHP: April 16, 1993

The Tom Thumb House is a historic house in Middleborough, Massachusetts. The 2 1/2 story wood-frame house was built in the 1870s as a summer home for the dwarf entertainer Charles Stratton, best known by his stage name, General Tom Thumb. It has Second Empire architecture, including a mansard roof, paired brackets in the cornice, and paired columns supporting the porch. The interior was built to meet the needs of the 3-foot-4-inch (102 cm) Stratton and his wife Lavinia, who was also a proportionate dwarf (midget,) however, few of its miniaturized features have survived.

The house was added to the National Register of Historic Places in 1993.

== See also ==
- National Register of Historic Places listings in Plymouth County, Massachusetts
- Middleborough Historical Museum, which exhibits an extensive collection of Tom Thumb's clothing and personal items from the house
