= Middleboro Secondary =

Railway line in Massachusetts

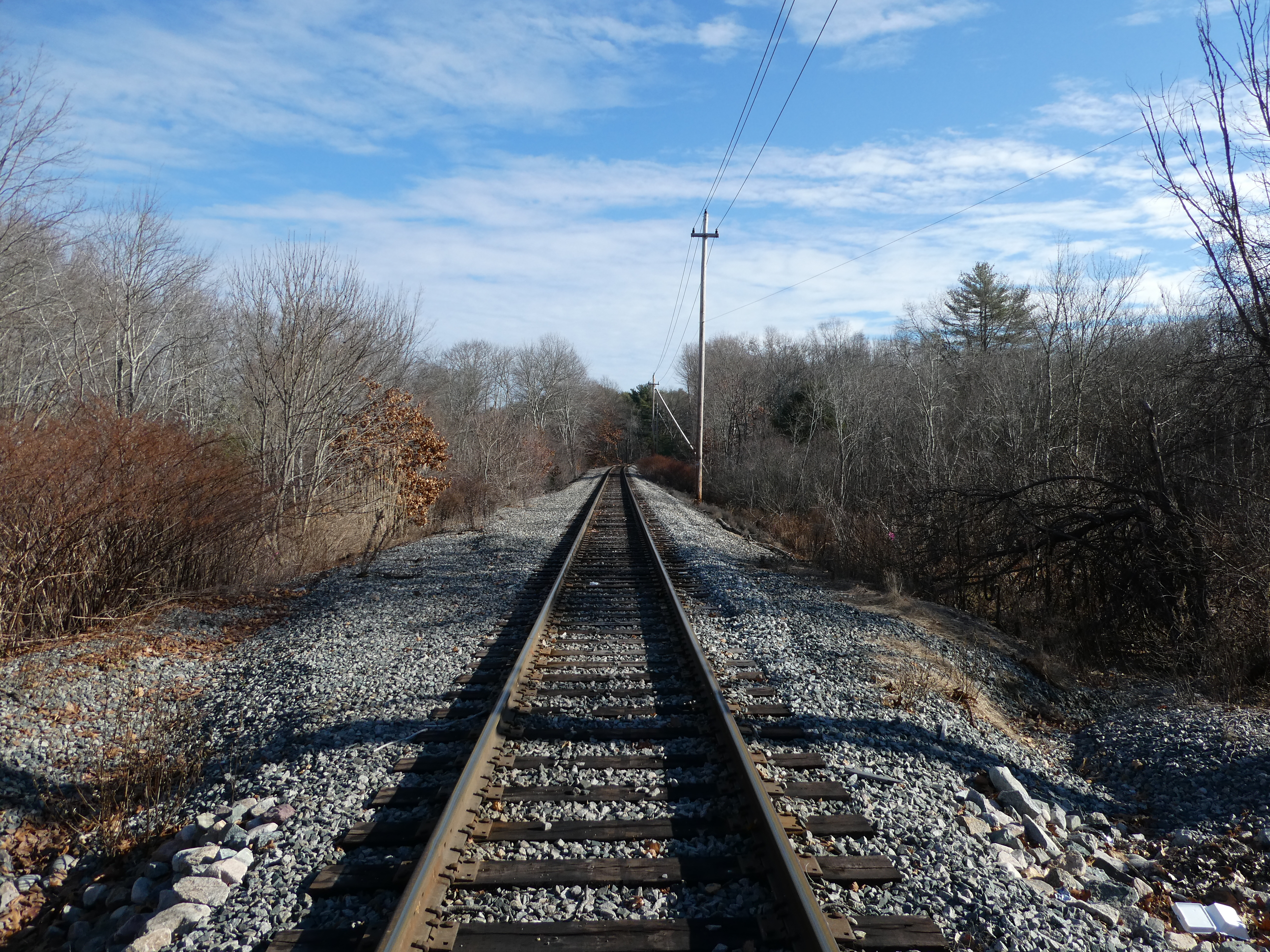
- Middleboro Secondary track at Barrowsville in December 2022

Overview
- Owner: MassDOT
- Locale: Bristol County and Plymouth County, Massachusetts
- Termini: Attleboro; Middleborough

Service
- Operator(s): CSX

Technical
- Line length: 21.1 miles (34.0 km)
- Track gauge: 4 ft 8 1/2 in (1,435 mm)

The Middleboro Secondary (also called Middleborough Secondary and Middleboro Subdivision) is a railroad line owned by MassDOT in the U.S. state of Massachusetts. The line runs from Attleboro to Middleborough via Taunton.

== Route ==
The line diverges from Amtrak's Northeast Corridor just north of Attleboro station. From there, it runs east through Norton then southeast through downtown Taunton. At Cotley Junction (near Weir Village), it separates from the New Bedford Subdivision and turns east. The line ends with a wye to the Middleborough Main Line and Cape Main Line just south of downtown Middleborough.

== History ==
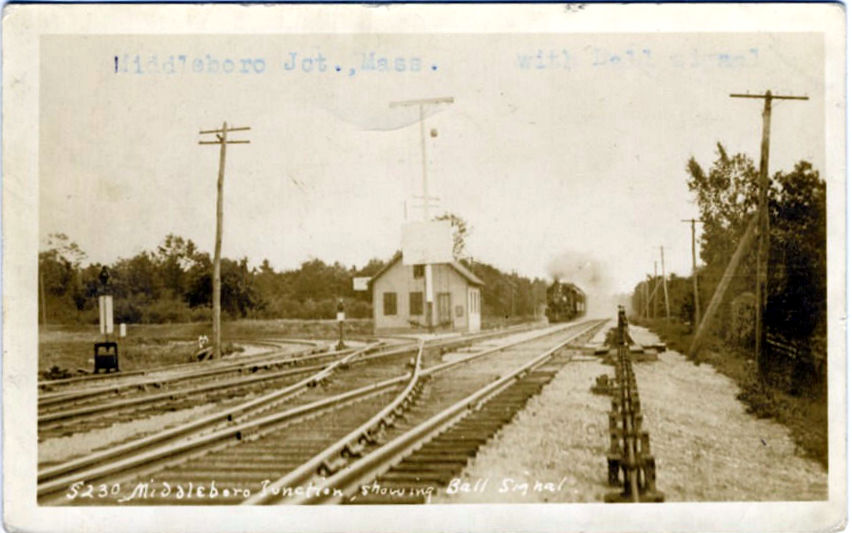
Middleborough Junction (Cotley Junction) in the early 20th century

The current Middleborough Subdivision is formed from sections of four different railroads built in the 19th century. The oldest section is from northwestern Taunton into downtown Taunton, opened in April 1836 as part of the Mansfield-Taunton Taunton Branch Railroad - one of the first railroad lines in New England. The New Bedford and Taunton Railroad completed an extension from Taunton south to New Bedford in 1840, including the current Middleboro Subdivision southeast of downtown Taunton. The Middleboro and Taunton Railroad opened a line from southeastern Taunton east to Middleborough in July 1856. In August 1871, the New Bedford and Taunton Railroad built a branch from Attleboro Junction in northwest Taunton to Attleboro.

The Old Colony acquired the Middleborough and Taunton Railroad in 1874. The same year, the New Bedford and Taunton Railroad became the New Bedford Railroad. It joined the Boston, Clinton, Fitchburg and New Bedford Railroad in 1876. The Old Colony acquired that system in 1879, and was itself merged into the New York, New Haven and Hartford Railroad in 1893. Year-round New York–Cape Cod and Boston–Fall River/New Bedford passenger service ended in 1958, and local service on the Attleboro–Taunton and Cotley Junction–Middleborough segments somewhat before then. However, summer-only trains from New York to Hyannis used the line from Attleboro to Middleborough from 1960 to 1964, as did Boston–Hyannis service on the Taunton–Middleborough section briefly in 1961.

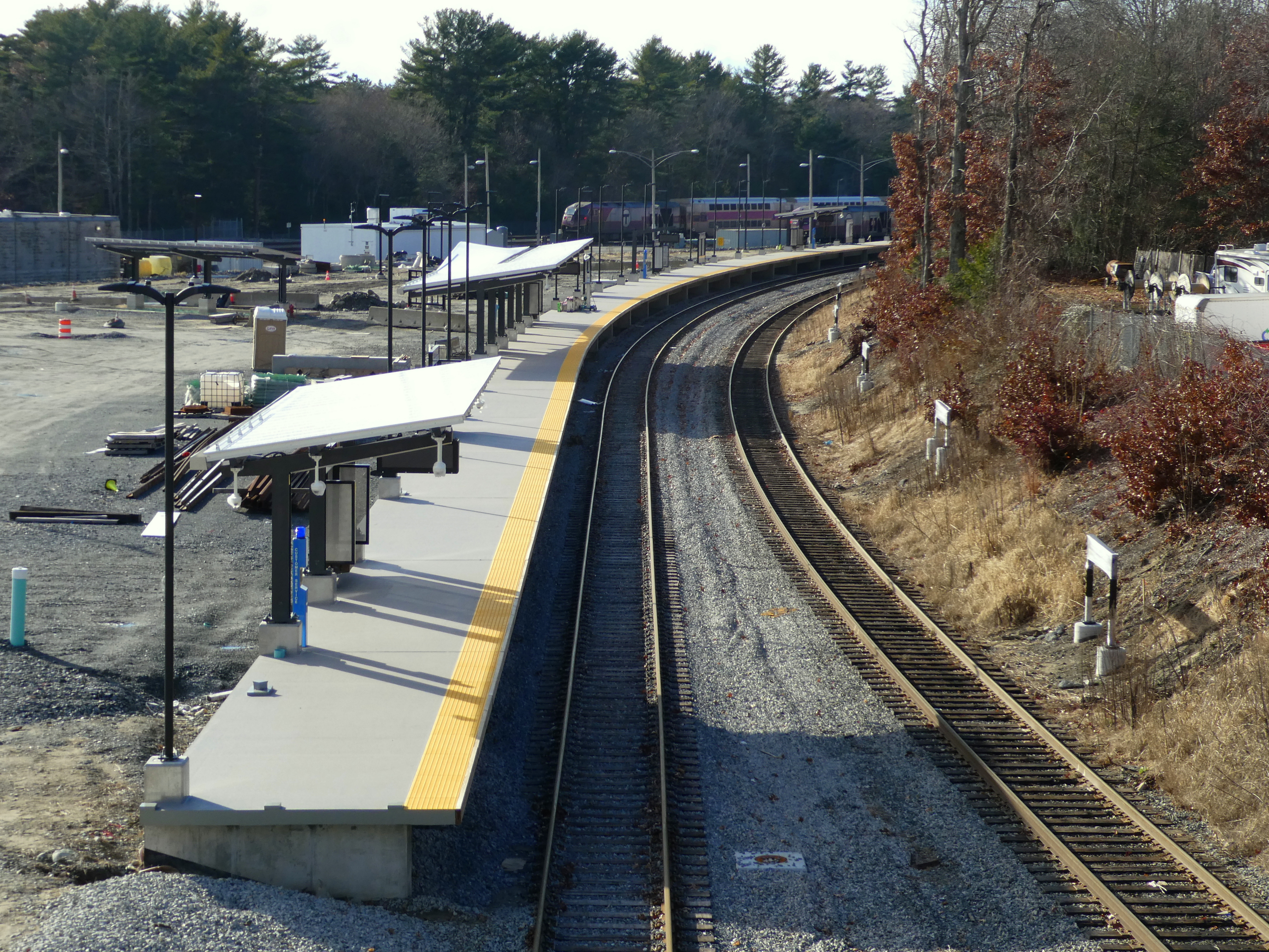
Middleborough station under construction in 2022

The New Haven Railroad folded into Penn Central in 1969, and the line became part of Conrail in 1976. The station purchased the line from Conrail, along with several other branch lines in Southeastern Massachusetts, for $1.2 million in December 1982. The Attleboro–Middleborough route was used by Amtrak's seasonal Cape Codder service from 1986 to 1996, and by the Cape Cod and Hyannis Railroad in 1988, both with a stop at Taunton. Freight service on the line was assigned to CSX in the 1999 breakup of Conrail.

In 2017, the Massachusetts Bay Transportation Authority announced that Phase 1 of the South Coast Rail project would use the Middleborough Secondary for MBTA Commuter Rail use between Cotley Junction and Middleborough. The MBTA issued a $403.5 million contract for the Middleborough Secondary and New Bedford Main Line portions of the project on August 24, 2020. The work included reconstruction of the Middleborough Secondary for passenger service and construction of the new Middleborough station. Fall River/New Bedford Line service began using the route on March 24, 2025.

== See also ==
- List of CSX Transportation lines
