= Lucile Bluford =

Lucile Harris Bluford (July 1, 1911 – June 13, 2003) was a journalist and opponent of segregation in America's education system, and after whom the Lucile H. Bluford Branch of the Kansas City Public Library is named.

== Early life ==
Lucile Bluford was born on July 1, 1911, in Salisbury, North Carolina, to John Henry Bluford and Viola Harris Bluford. Her father was a professor at the state's Agricultural and Technical College. She was the oldest of three. In 1921 when Bluford was 10, and upon the death of his mother, John Bluford accepted a position teaching science at Lincoln High School in Kansas City, Missouri. Bluford attended Wendell Phillips Elementary and Lincoln College Preparatory Academy, known at the time as Lincoln High School. At a young age, she was exposed to segregated education, as Missouri was a Jim Crow state that adhered to "separate but equal" doctrine.

== Career ==
Bluford was encouraged in her interest in journalism by a high school English teacher, Trussie Smothers, at the segregated Lincoln High School. She was the valedictorian of her 1928 graduating class. After high school, she attended the University of Kansas School of Journalism with honors in 1932. Bluford was the second Black student to ever study at the KU journalism program, and served as night editor and telegraph editor on the school's student newspaper. She worked on the school newspaper and yearbook, and after school, at the Black-owned newspaper, the Kansas City Call. After graduating, Bluford spent a Summer working for The Daily World in Atlanta before returning to Kansas City to take a job at the Black-owned weekly, The American. Bluford made weekly newspapers which addressed the unfair treatment of African Americans and the paper fought for racial justice. Chester A. Franklin, founder of the Call, contacted Bluford and told her he had an opening for her at his newspaper. She began working for the Kansas City Call in 1932. Between 1968 and 1983, Bluford wrote "253 news stories and 30 commentaries" for the Call, which represent 79% of the total published articles. She stayed at the Call for the entirety of her 69-year career, rising through the ranks until she was the second editor and publisher of the newspaper. After Franklin's death in 1955, Bluford became part-owner with Franklin's widow, Ada Crogman Franklin, and continued to work at the newspaper until her death.

=== Lawsuits ===
In 1939, Bluford applied to the Master of Journalism program at the renowned Missouri School of Journalism in Columbia, Missouri, and her application was originally accepted but once she showed to enroll she was denied because of her race. At the time Bluford attempted to enroll, African-American students were expected to attend all-Black Lincoln University in Jefferson City, Missouri, 30 miles away from the Columbia, Missouri, university campus.

Prior to Bluford's attempt to enroll in the University of Missouri, Lloyd L. Gaines filed a lawsuit against the university which eventually went to the Supreme Court. The Court ruled that the university must allow the acceptance of Black students into the law school.

On October 13, 1939, with the help of Charles Huston of the NAACP, Bluford filed the first of several lawsuits against the university. Due in part to her association with the NAACP, Bluford was denied admission to the University of Missouri's graduate journalism program. MU officials insisted she must enroll in Lincoln University's journalism program, even though Lincoln had no such program. By 1941, her case had made it to the Missouri Supreme Court, but she lost. Citing low attendance because of World War II, the University of Missouri subsequently closed its graduate journalism program. The case prompted the opening of a School of Journalism at Lincoln University. After 11 attempts, Bluford never attended the University of Missouri.

== Legacy ==
Bluford has been called the "Matriarch" and the "Conscience" of Kansas City. The University of Missouri honored Bluford with an honorary doctorate degree in 1989. The university also named a residence hall in her honor in 2018. The State of Missouri recognizes July 1 as Lucile Bluford Day to honor her contributions to journalism and the state. In 2002, Bluford received the Kansas Citian of the Year Award from the Greater Kansas City Chamber of Commerce. Bluford also received a Distinguished Service Award from the NAACP.

== Honors and awards ==
1961	Curator's Award in Journalism from Lincoln University, Jefferson City, M.O.
1973	Served as Pulitzer Prize Journalism person
1975	Distinguished Service Award from NAACP in N.Y.
1976	Roy Wilkins Award from Gary, I.N.
