= Middleborough High School =

High school in Middleborough, Massachusetts

Location
- 71 East Grove Street; Middleborough, Massachusetts 02346; United States
- 41°52′50″N 70°54′17″W

Information
- Type: Public; Open enrollment
- Established: 1873
- School district: Middleborough Public Schools
- Principal: Paul Branagan
- Teaching staff: 65.61 (FTE)
- Grades: 9–12
- Enrollment: 827 (2023–2024)
- Student to teacher ratio: 12.60
- Campus: Rural
- Colors: Black & Orange
- Athletics conference: MIAA - Division 3
- Mascot: Sachem
- Newspaper: The Sachem Sentry
- Website: School website

Middleborough High School is a public high school located in Middleborough, Massachusetts, established in 1873. The school is located at 71 East Grove Street. Middleborough High has an approximate student enrollment of 850 students in grades 9–12. The school's mascot is known as the "Sachem" and the school colors are black and orange. The current building opened in 2021.

== See also ==
- Pierce Academy
