= Middleborough station =

Rail station in Middleborough, Massachusetts, US

Middleborough
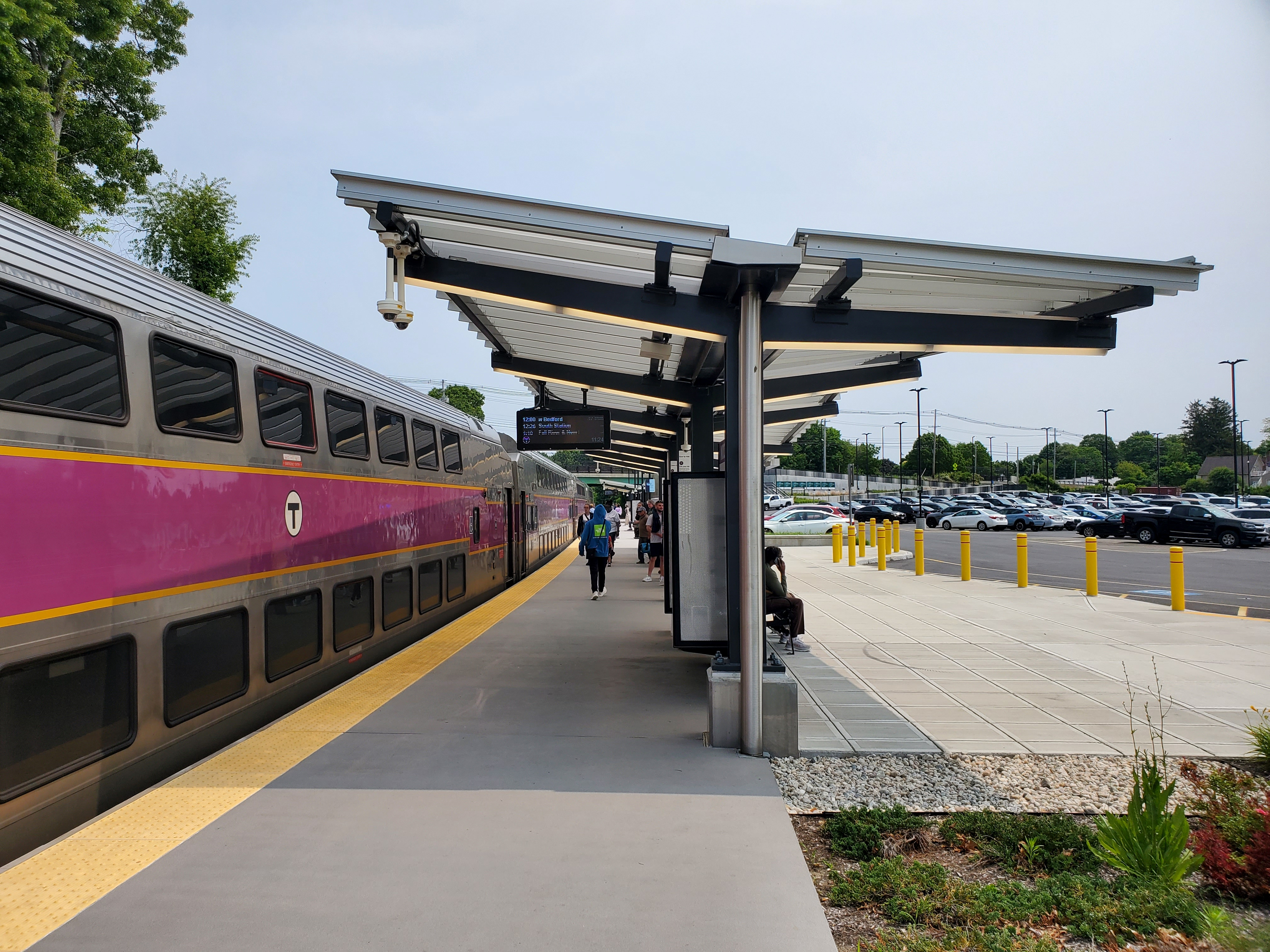
- An inbound train at Middleborough in June 2025

General information
- Location: 52 West Grove Street; Middleborough, Massachusetts
- Coordinates: 41.88707°N 70.92287°W
- Line: Middleboro Secondary
- Platforms: 1 side platform
- Tracks: 2
- Connections: GATRA: Downtown Middleborough Shuttle, Link 4

Construction
- Parking: 500 spaces
- Cycle facilities: Bike racks
- Accessible: Yes

Other information
- Fare zone: 8

History
- Opened: March 24, 2025

Passengers
- 2030: 670 daily boardings (projected)

Services
Preceding station	MBTA	Following station
Bridgewater toward South Station	Fall River/New Bedford Line	East Taunton toward Fall River or New Bedford
Former services
Preceding station	Cape Cod and Hyannis Railroad	Following station
Bridgewater toward Braintree	Braintree-Hyannis 1984-1988	Wareham toward Hyannis or Falmouth
Preceding station	New York, New Haven and Hartford Railroad	Following station
Titicut toward Boston	Boston–Middleborough	Terminus
Titicut toward Boston	Boston–Fall River until 1931	Lakeville toward Fall River
Bridgewater toward Boston	Boston–Woods Hole	Tremont toward Woods Hole
Bridgewater toward Boston	Boston–Hyannis	Tremont toward Hyannis
Brockton toward Boston	Boston–Provincetown	Tremont toward Provincetown
Taunton toward New York	Cape Codder until 1937	Wareham toward Hyannis or Woods Hole
Terminus	Plymouth and Middleborough Branch	East Middleborough toward Plymouth
Location

Middleborough station is an MBTA Commuter Rail station in Middleborough, Massachusetts, served by the Fall River/New Bedford Line. It opened on March 24, 2025, as part of the South Coast Rail project, replacing Middleborough/Lakeville station for regular service. The station has a single side platform located inside the wye between the Middleborough Main Line and the Middleboro Secondary.

The Fall River Railroad opened through Middleborough in 1845–46. Three branch lines from Middleborough followed: the Cape Cod Branch Railroad in 1847, the Middleborough and Taunton Railroad in 1856, and the Plymouth and Middleborough Railroad in 1892. The lines were consolidated under the Old Colony Railroad, which constructed a Tudor-style station building in 1887. The New York, New Haven and Hartford Railroad acquired the Old Colony in 1893. Passenger service declined in the 20th century, with commuter rail service to Boston ending in 1959.

From 1984 to 1988, Cape Cod and Hyannis Railroad seasonal commuter and excursion service stopped in Middleborough at the former station, which was demolished in the 1990s. MBTA service on the Middleborough/Lakeville line began in 1997, using Middleborough/Lakeville station to the south rather than the downtown station site. In 2017, a re-evaluation of the South Coast Rail project proposed an interim route via Middleborough, with a new Middleborough station. The site at the Pilgrim Junction wye was chosen in 2018, and a construction contract was awarded in 2020.

== Station layout ==
The station is located inside the wye between the north-south Middleborough Main Line and the east-west Middleboro Secondary, slightly south of downtown Middleborough. The 800-foot (240 m)-long high-level platform is located on the northwest leg of the wye, with pedestrian access to West Grove Street (Route 28) at its northeast end. A 500-space parking lot is located inside the wye, with an access driveway running southeast to South Main Street (Route 105) at its intersection with I-495 ramps. Space is reserved for a proposed 400-foot (120 m)-long platform on the southwest leg of the wye (across from the Middleborough Layover, the main layover yard for the Middleborough/Lakeville Line) to serve future shuttle trains to Cape Cod. The station is expected to draw 670 daily boardings by 2030.

== History ==
=== Old Colony Railroad ===
Railroads in Middleborough and Taunton as originally built. The Fall River Railroad is red, the Cape Cod Railroad blue, the Middleborough & Taunton Branch lime green, and the Plymouth & Middleborough Railroad orange.

The Fall River Railroad opened between South Braintree and Fall River in stages from June 1845 to December 1846. The section between Myricks and Middleborough opened in mid-1846. The last portion to open was that between North Bridgewater and Middleborough on December 21, 1846.

The connecting Cape Cod Branch Railroad opened from Middleborough to Sandwich in May 1847, and to Hyannis in 1854 as the Cape Cod Railroad. The Fall River Railroad merged with the Old Colony Railroad in 1854 to become the Old Colony and Fall River Railroad; it was renamed as the Old Colony and Newport Railroad in 1863 and the Old Colony Railroad again in 1872. The Cape Cod Railroad was acquired by the Old Colony in 1872, serving as its Cape Main Line.

The Middleborough and Taunton Railroad opened from Middleborough to south of Taunton on the New Bedford and Taunton Railroad in 1856; it was acquired by the Old Colony in 1874. By 1885, schedules on the Old Colony were arranged to allow commuting from Middleborough. Two other stations were located in Middleborough on the Cape Main Line south of downtown: Rock (also known as Rock Meeting House) at Miller Street in Rock Village, and South Middleboro at Spruce Street.

The Old Colony began work on a new station in November 1885. It was completed in 1887. The Tudor-style station (similar to the still-extant Kingston station) was located at Station Street, replacing the original Fall River Railroad station on the same site. The Old Colony Railroad was an early proponent of decorating the grounds of its train stations. By 1891, Middleborough had a "large, rolling, picturesque lawn" and "thousands of bedding plants" surrounding the station.

The Plymouth and Middleborough Railroad opened between its namesake cities in 1892 and was immediately leased to the Old Colony. The next year, the Old Colony was acquired by the New York, New Haven and Hartford Railroad. Middleborough served as a rail hub for southeastern Massachusetts, with lines in five directions. Facilities at Middleborough included a freight house, a freight yard, and a roundhouse.

=== 20th century ===
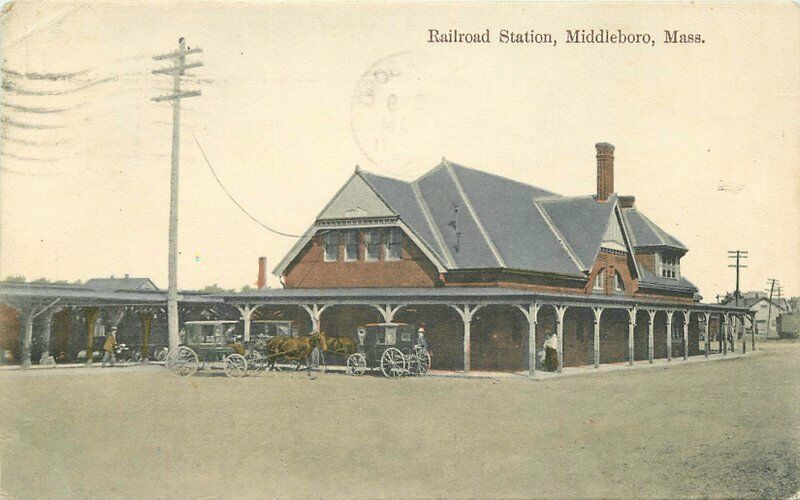
A 1911 postcard of the station

Grade crossings were eliminated in downtown Middleborough in 1900. Centre Street and Grove Street were placed on bridges over the tracks, while South Main Street was depressed under the tracks.

Passenger service on the lightly-used branch to Plymouth was discontinued in 1927; this also ended local service between Taunton and Middleborough, which had operated as a Plymouth–Middleborough–Taunton service (sometimes through-routed to Providence). Freight service on the Plymouth–Middleborough line, largely used by cranberry growers near the line, ended in 1939. Passenger service on the Middleborough–Myricks section of the original Fall River line ended in 1931; freight service ended in 1932, and the line was abandoned in 1937. Rock and South Middleboro stations were closed on July 17, 1938, as part of the 88 stations case, a massive and controversial station closure.

Middleborough was a stop for New York–Cape Cod trains (with a short backup move to reach the station) until 1938, after which the trains ran express between Taunton and Wareham. This year-round Cape Codder service ran until 1958, then only during summers from 1960 to 1964. Commuter service to Boston (with Middleborough the outer terminus for some trains) ran until June 30, 1959, when the New Haven ceased all passenger service on the Old Colony Division. The bridge over the Neponset River burned soon afterwards, preventing any further service from Boston to the Cape stopping at Middleborough; a Boston–Hyannis train via Stoughton ran during the summer of 1961.

The lines north, west, and southeast from Middleborough remained in use for freight service: by the New Haven until 1969, Penn Central to 1971, Conrail to 1997, and CSX since. Freight service southeast from Middleborough was taken over by the Bay Colony Railroad shortline in 1982 and the Massachusetts Coastal Railroad in 2007, interchanging with CSX at Middleborough Yard.

=== MBTA era ===
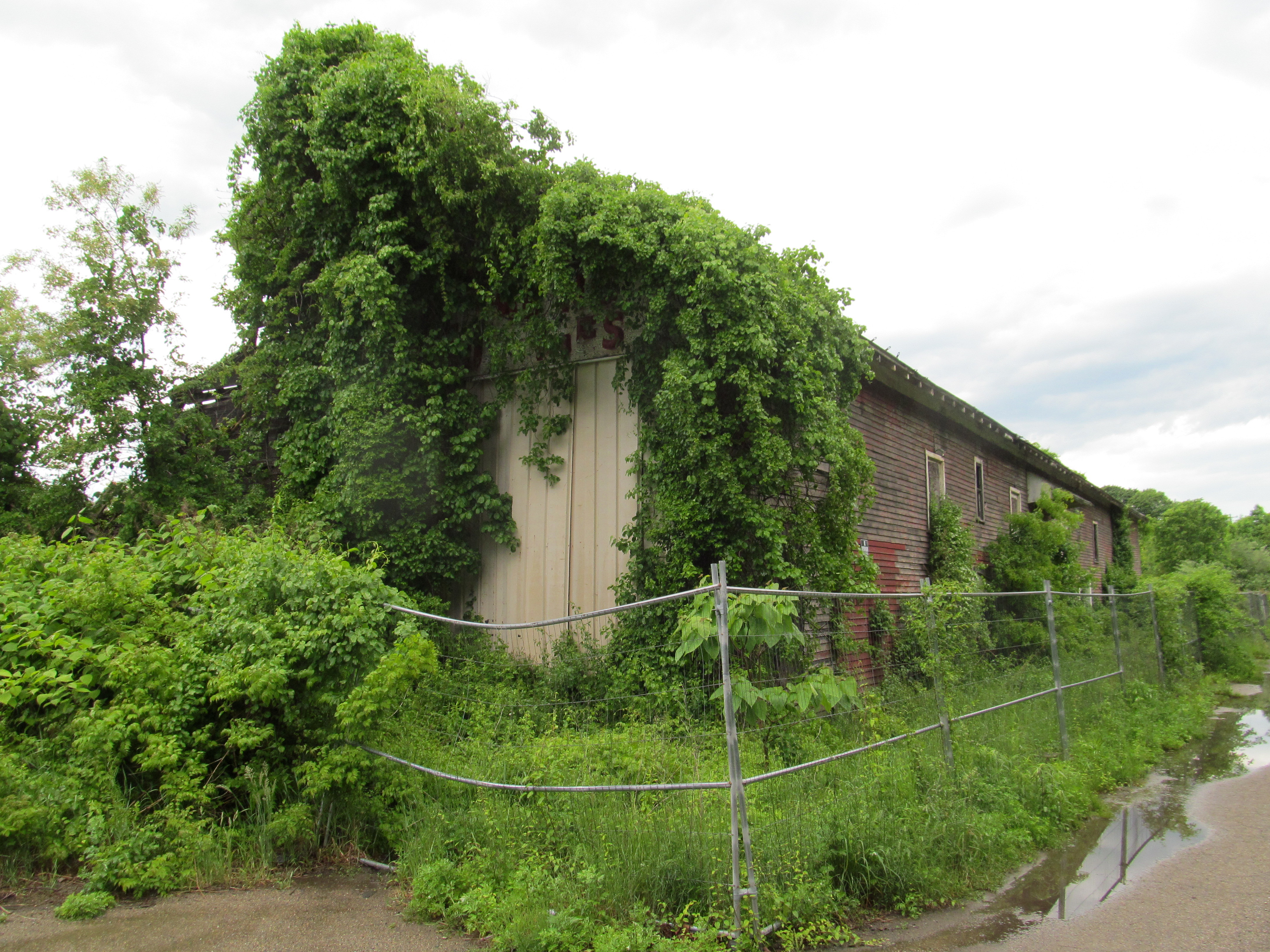
The former freight house in 2017

Restoration of passenger service was proposed intermittently through the 1960s and 1970s. On October 15, 1979, a special train ran from Braintree to Middleborough to publicize the state's plans for restored service. A 1974 state analysis of restoring commuter rail service indicated that the Middleborough station could be reused. From 1984 to 1988, Cape Cod and Hyannis Railroad seasonal commuter and excursion service stopped in Middleborough at the former station. From 1986 to 1996, Amtrak's Cape Codder ran through Middleborough, but like the 1960s trains it did not stop there due to the station location. The former station was demolished in the 1990s. The 1887-built freight house was added to the National Register of Historic Places as part of the Middleborough Center Historic District in 2000; it was proposed for restoration in 2011. It was destroyed by fire in October 2020. (Note: See File:Remains of Middleborough freight house, October 2020.jpg.)

In 1984, a state-directed Massachusetts Bay Transportation Authority (MBTA) study found that restoration of commuter rail service would be feasible. A Draft Environmental Impact Statement was released in May 1990, followed by a Final Environmental Impact Statement in 1992. Both called for a Middleborough/Lakeville station off Route 105 south of Middleborough on the Lakeville border, rather than reusing the old station site. MBTA Commuter Rail Middleborough/Lakeville Line service to Middleborough/Lakeville station began on September 29, 1997; a layover facility was located just west of the wye on the Middleboro Secondary.

=== South Coast Rail ===
Planning in the 1980s for the South Coast Rail project – restoration of passenger service to Fall River and New Bedford – considered routes via Middleborough, Stoughton, and Attleboro. The Stoughton route was the preferred alternative until the project was cancelled in 2003. Planning restarted in 2005; in September 2008, MassDOT released 18 potential station sites, including a "village-style" station in downtown Middleborough. By 2009, the Stoughton route was again the preferred alternative.

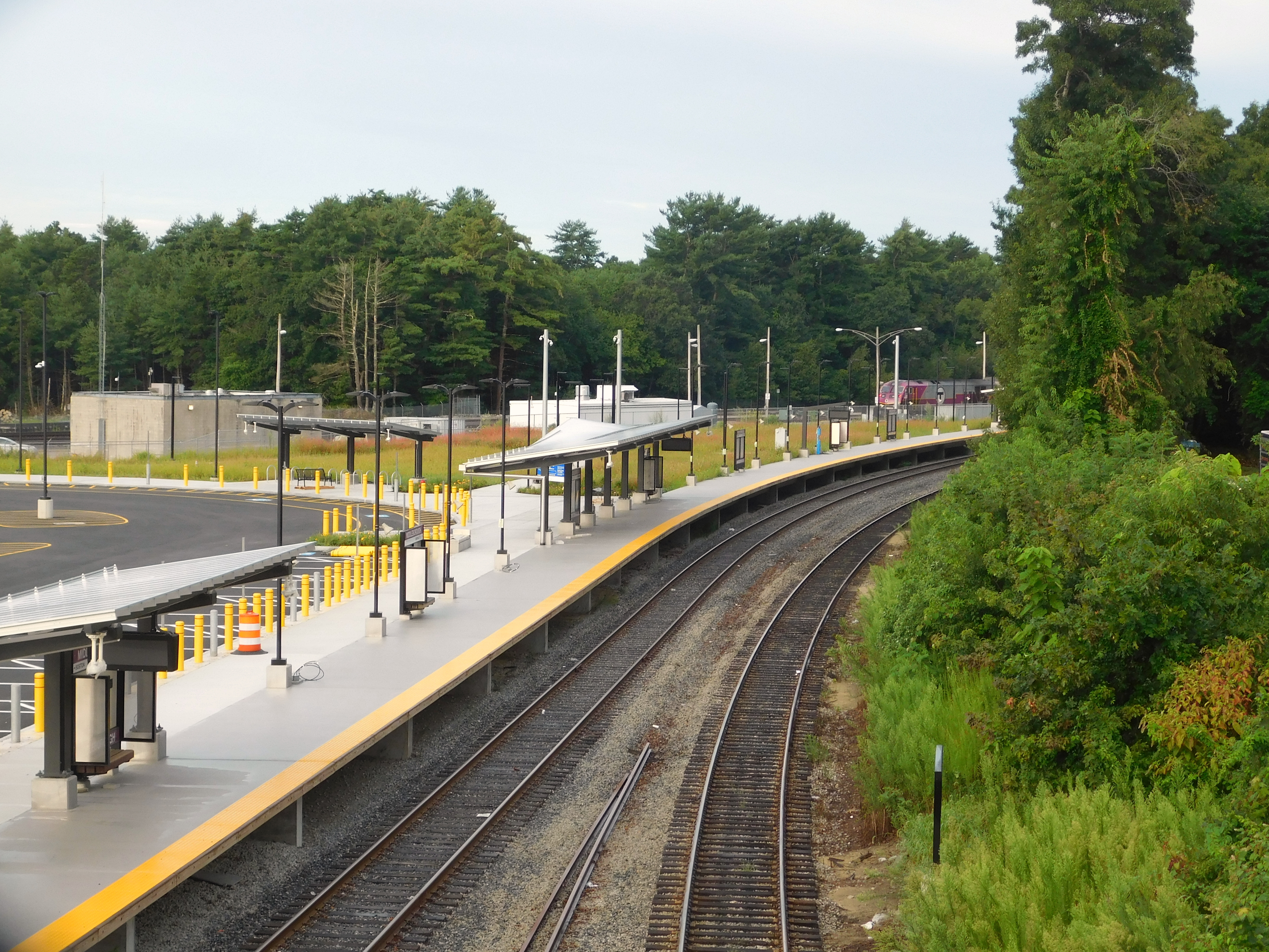
Station construction nearing completion in August 2023

In 2017, the project was re-evaluated due to cost issues. The new proposal called for early service via Middleborough by 2022, followed by full service via Stoughton by 2030. A new Middleborough station was to replace the existing Middleborough/Lakeville station, which could not be served by South Coast Rail trains. Middleborough and Lakeville officials were critical of the possibility of abandoning the existing Middleborough/Lakeville station - which had attracted transit-oriented development - or requiring its riders to take a shuttle train, as well as possible traffic issues from a downtown Middleborough station.

The January 2018 Draft Supplemental Environmental Impact Report considered three potential operational patterns: a reverse move to serve the existing station, shuttle service from the existing station to Bridgewater station, or a new Middleborough station with a bus shuttle from the existing station. The last option was preferred because it had a shorter travel time than the reverse move, and would not require new double track as the Bridgewater shuttle would. Two possible Middleborough station sites were considered – the former downtown station site, and the wye (Pilgrim Junction) between the Middleborough Main Line and Middleboro Secondary – with the latter preferred for lower costs and less traffic impact. The CapeFLYER would continue to use Middleborough/Lakeville station, as the new station would not have a platform on the Middleborough Main Line.

Buildings at 161 South Main Street and 52 West Grove Street were demolished in 2020 to make room for the station and its parking lot. The MBTA awarded a $403.5 million contract for the Middleboro Secondary and New Bedford Secondary portions of the project, including Middleborough station, on August 24, 2020. The planned 37 months of construction began later in 2020, with a late 2023 opening expected. The station was 33% complete by February 2022, with all platform foundations in place. The platform and the canopy steelwork were in place by November 2022. Opening was delayed to mid-2024 in September 2023; at that point, the station was 98% complete and expected to be finished by the end of 2023. In June 2024, the opening of the project was delayed to May 2025. Middleborough station was complete by that time. Service began on March 24, 2025.

Middleborough station includes space for a potential future platform to serve shuttle trains to Cape Cod. In fall 2020, the MBTA began a feasibility study for implementing Buzzards Bay commuter rail service in conjunction with South Coast Rail. Completed in 2021, the study analyzed two alternatives for service to Buzzards Bay or Bourne station. Both options would require a transfer at Middleborough, with the possibility of some direct trains at off-peak times.
