= Carl Kelsey =

American sociologist

- Born: September 2, 1870; Grinnell, Iowa
- Died: October 15, 1953 (aged 83); Philadelphia, Pennsylvania
- Education: Iowa College, Andover Theological Seminary, University of Göttingen, University of Pennsylvania
- Scientific career
- Fields: Sociology
- Workplaces: University of Pennsylvania
- Thesis: The Negro Farmer (1903)
- Notable students: Willard Waller, Richard R. Wright, Jr.

Carl Kelsey (September 2, 1870 in Grinnell, Iowa—October 15, 1953 in Philadelphia, Pennsylvania) was an American sociologist and professor of sociology at the University of Pennsylvania.

== Biography ==
A native of Grinnell, Iowa, Kelsey was educated at Iowa College, Andover Theological Seminary, the University of Göttingen, and the University of Pennsylvania. He began his career as a social worker in Helena, Montana in 1895, before moving to do the same job in Buffalo, New York, Boston, and Chicago. In 1903, he received his Ph.D. from the University of Pennsylvania, and joined their faculty as an instructor the same year. He became an assistant professor there in 1904, and a full professor in 1907. From 1913 to 1925, he was the vice president of the American Academy of Political and Social Science, and served as its secretary for many years.

== Work ==
Kelsey's best known book is The Negro Farmer, originally published as his Ph.D. thesis in 1903. It argued that African American farmers were incompetent, in line with mainstream stereotypes at the time. He became active in the child welfare movement in the early 1900s. He helped establish the Philadelphia Training School for Social Work in 1908 and served as its consulting director for the following year. This school later became the School of Social Policy and Practice. Though he originally believed in a Lamarckian view of human characteristics, this changed starting in 1907. That year, he became a prominent proponent of the Boasian view that all races were approximately equal in their mental ability, and that racial differences were "largely superficial".

== Students ==
Among his students were Willard Waller, Richard R. Wright, Jr., and Alice Paul.
