= Maxim Motors =

Defunct American motor vehicle manufacturer

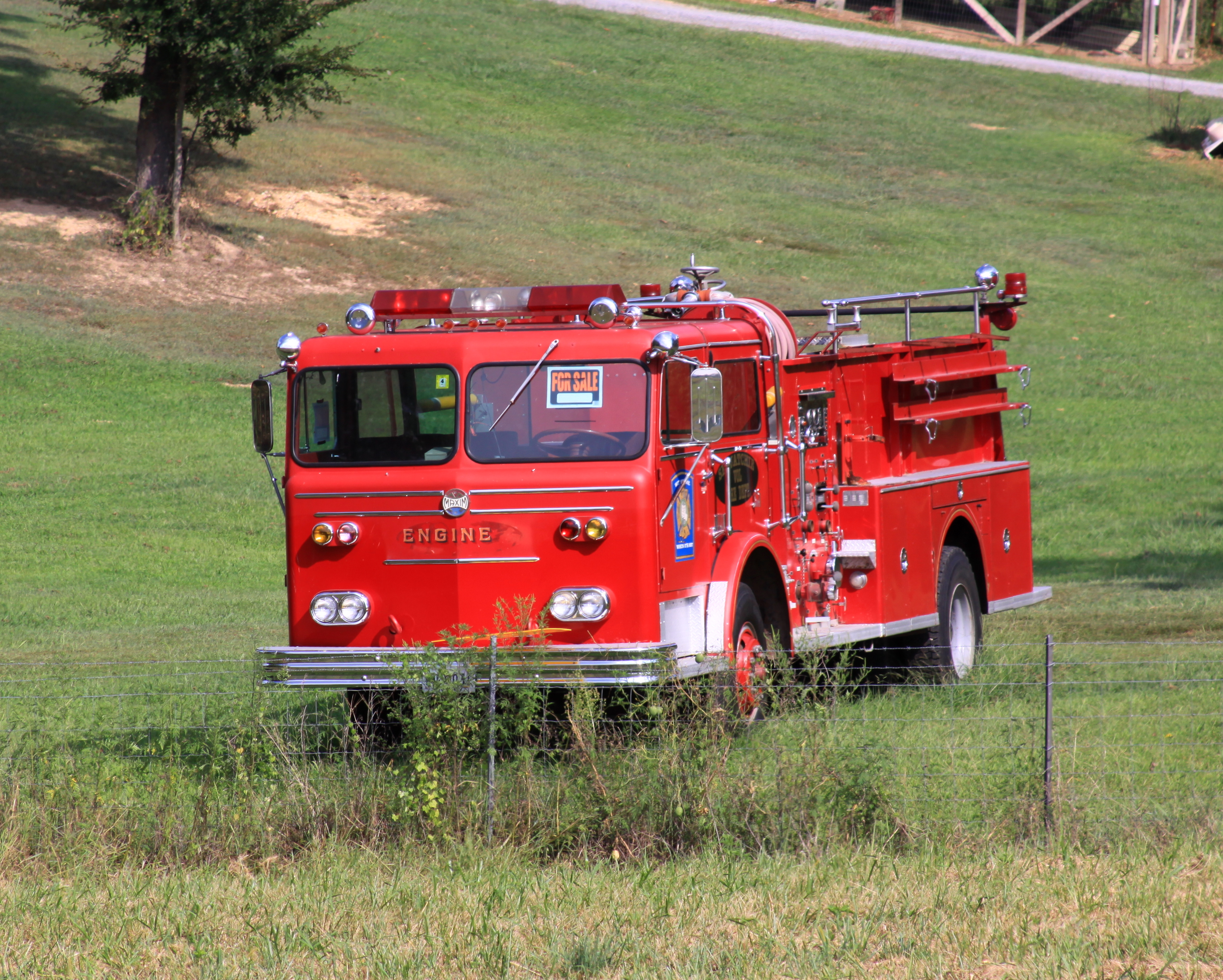
- Industry: Automotive
- Founded: 1914
- Founder: Carlton Maxim
- Defunct: 1989
- Headquarters: Middleborough, Mass., U.S.
- Products: Firefighting apparatus

The Maxim Motor Company was an American automaker headquartered in Middleborough, Massachusetts, specializing in the manufacture of firefighting apparatus. From the time of its founding in 1920 to the end of operations in 1989, the company manufactured over 3,000 fire engines.

== History ==
The company was founded in 1914 by Middleborough Fire Chief Carlton Maxim, who felt that he could make a better fire engine than the town's recent purchase. By 1920 it was an established manufacturer of fire engines for towns in Massachusetts. From the 1920s through the 1980s it expanded to small but reliable markets in the south, Midwest, west coast, and internationally. In the late 1950s, Maxim, along with Mack and Seagrave, began to build Cab-forward fire trucks, which had originated with the American LaFrance 700 series. The company became Maxim Motor Division of Seagrave Fire Apparatus on November 30, 1956, and operated as an independent corporation. It was known as Maxim Industries when bought by North Street Associates in 1975. The name was changed back to Maxim Motor Company when owned by David Deane, owner of Springfield Fire Equipment. It was acquired by Harvey Waite in 1985 and company changed to Maxim Incorporated. Waite took on a partner in the form of Urban Transportation Development Company (UTDC), a subsidiary of Lavalin Ltd., a worldwide engineering company. UTDC bought Waite out in 1988.

On December 9, 1989, it ceased operation due to heavy competition. The main competitor was Ward LaFrance who could sell a Fire pumper for US$50,000 less than the US$180,000 asking price for a Maxim pumper.

In 2009 Maxim was re-established as a brand of custom fire apparatus by Greenwood Emergency Vehicles of North Attleboro, Massachusetts.

== Existing examples ==
The Middleborough Historical Museum exhibits a 1934 Maxim fire engine.

== External ==
- Photographs of Maxim equipment
