= Daniel J. Kelleher =

American lawyer

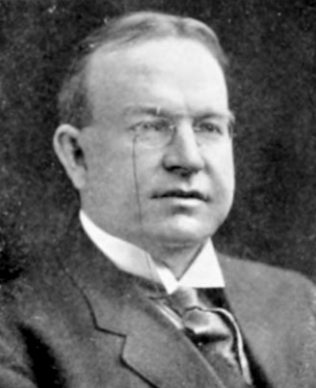
- Born: February 5, 1864; Middleborough, Massachusetts
- Died: February 20, 1929 (aged 65); Seattle, Washington
- Occupations: Banker, lawyer

Daniel J. Kelleher (February 5, 1864 – February 20, 1929) was the chairman of the board of directors of the Seattle National Bank and took an active part in consolidating two of the largest banks in Seattle, Washington, the Puget Sound National and the Seattle National, now known as the Seattle National Bank, the largest bank in the State of Washington.

== Early life ==
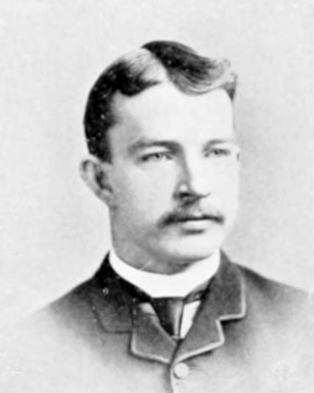
At Harvard, c. 1885

He was born in Middleborough, Massachusetts, to parents Daniel and Mary Kelleher. He attended public schools, and Harvard University, graduating in the class of 1885. He was a private tutor and law student in Syracuse, New York, from 1885 to 1890.

== Professional life ==
In 1890, he relocated to Seattle, forming a law partnership with Judge George Meade Emory, and was actively engaged in the practice of law, as a member of that firm (later Bausman, Kelleher, Oldham & Goodale).

For several years he divided his time between banking and the law. On September 1, 1914, he retired from the law practice to give his whole time to the Seattle National Bank, as active chairman of the board of directors. Kelleher was also president of the Bank for Savings in Seattle, of the Bank of Commerce of Everett, and a director and on the executive committee of the Bank of Commerce of Anacortes, Washington.

He was president of the Riverside Timber Co., owning large timber lands in the State of Washington. In 1909, Kelleher purchased Mt. Airy, an estate of 2,200 acres (8.9 km^{2}) in the Shenandoah Valley of Virginia, which formerly belonged to his wife's grandfather Colonel Meem. He was one of the founders of the Harvard Club of Seattle, and was for several years its president.

He died in Seattle on February 20, 1929.
