= Richard R. Wright Jr. =

American sociologist, social worker and minister

Richard Robert Wright Jr.
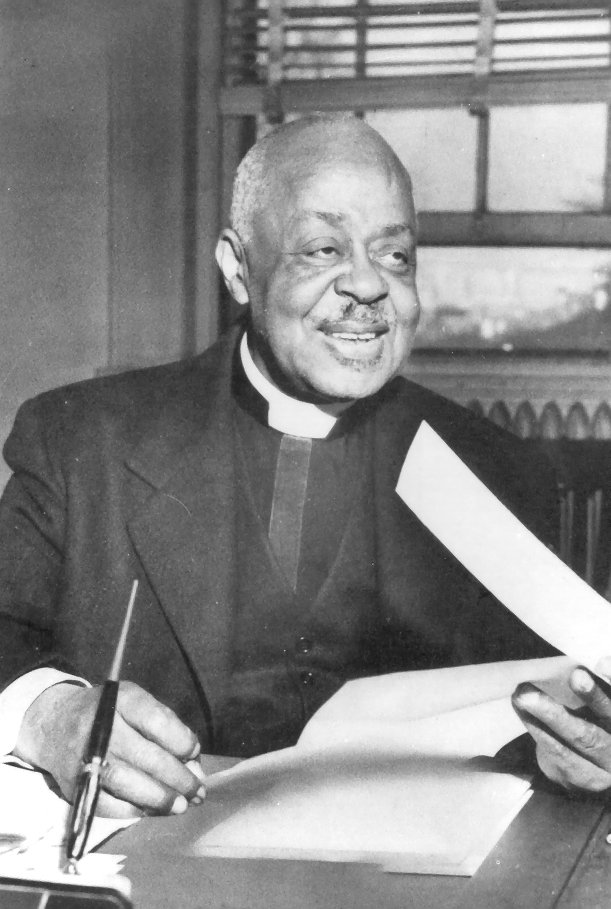
- Richard Robert Wright Jr.
- Born: April 16, 1878; Cuthbert, Georgia
- Died: December 12, 1967 (aged 89)
- Education: University of Pennsylvania, University of Chicago, Georgia State College
- Known for: Work on social welfare
- Spouse: Charlotte Crogman
- Children: 4 (including Ruth Wright Hayre)
- Scientific career
- Fields: Sociology
- Thesis: The Negro in Pennsylvania: A Study in Economic History (1911)

Richard Robert Wright Jr. (April 16, 1878 in Cuthbert, Georgia – December 12, 1967) was an American sociologist, social worker, and minister. In 1911, Wright became the first African American to earn a doctorate in sociology from an organized graduate school when he received his PhD from the University of Pennsylvania.

Wright was the editor from 1909-1936 for The Christian Recorder, then based in Philadelphia, Pennsylvania. It is known as "the oldest existing periodical published by African-Americans in the United States whose existence dated before the Civil War."

== Early life and education ==
Richard Robert Wright Jr. was born on April 16, 1878, in Cuthbert, Georgia. He attended Georgia State College, the first public historically black college in the state. His father Richard Robert Wright was founding president in 1891 and served for thirty years. Wright began attending the Divinity School at the University of Chicago in 1898, where he found mentors in William Rainey Harper and Shailer Mathews.

In 1903 Wright studied in Berlin, Germany, in part inspired by the academic path of W.E.B. DuBois. Wright studied in Berlin for a term then went to the University of Leipzig, where he wrote his thesis The Historicity of the Acts of the Apostles. He submitted his thesis to the University of Chicago who offered him “an AM… and a fellowship in New Testament Theology and doctorate [in theology]”.

Influenced by DuBois, Wright had become interested in the new field of sociology and moved to Philadelphia to work on it. In 1911, Wright became the first African-American to earn a doctorate in sociology from an organized graduate school when he received his PhD from the University of Pennsylvania. He wrote his dissertation on "History of the Pennsylvania Negro" under the supervision of Professor Carl Kelsey. He was one of the first African Americans to earn a PhD from the University of Pennsylvania. Wright was preceded by at least one other African-American at Penn: Pezavia O'Connell, who earned a PhD in 1898, in Semitic Studies, for a dissertation on notions of the clean and unclean in the Hebrew Bible. During his time in the doctoral program at Penn, Wright overlapped with the suffragist Alice Paul, and they shared the same advisor in Carl Kelsey.

Education was one of the building blocks that defined Wright. Early in life he studied under his father, who was a strong role model. Georgia State College was the first college he attended, where his father was the president. Georgia State College was a technical college that offered few classical courses. After Wright graduated from Georgia State College in 1898, he enrolled in the Divinity School at the University of Chicago. The University had a significant influence on his life. Here he was introduced to biblical studies, and he followed his own path into ministry. Soon after he received his Bachelor of Divinity Degree (1901) and Masters in Biblical Languages (1904), he gained an interest in the new field of sociology. This interest led him to the University of Pennsylvania, where he followed the work of W.E.B. DuBois. He wrote his dissertation on the Philadelphia Negro under the supervision of Carl Kelsey.

== Career ==
From 1909 to 1936, Wright served as editor for The Christian Recorder, "the oldest existing periodical published by African-Americans in the United States whose existence dated before the Civil War." Based in Philadelphia since 1852, it was a primary literary voice for the African Methodist Episcopal Church (AME Church), the first black independent denomination founded in the United States. It also was a major source of news and information about the black community across several regions. As editor, Wright focused on social welfare, becoming a leading advocate on migrant rights during the Great Migration of African Americans to the North from the rural South.

During his editorship, Wright was also deeply involved in banking. He and his father had founded the Citizen's and Southern Bank Building in Philadelphia. Wright advocated for African-American owned banks that served not only as financial institutions, but as symbols of independence and self-reliance for blacks.

In 1928, Wright returned to the ministry as the pastor of the Ward AME Church in Philadelphia.

In 1932, Wright moved from Philadelphia to Wilberforce, Ohio, to serve as the 9th President of Wilberforce University. Founded during the Civil War, this was the first college to be owned and operated by African Americans. He served for a total of 5 years, from 1932–1936, and 1941–1942.

== Publications ==
- Self-Help in Negro Education. Cheyney, PA: Committee of Twelve for the Advancement of the Interests of the Negro Race, ca. 1909.
- The Negro in Pennsylvania: A Study in Economic History. Philadelphia, A.M.E. book concern, 1912.
- 87 Years Behind the Black Curtain: An Autobiography. Philadelphia, Rare Book Co., 1965.

== Personal life ==
Wright was the son of Elizabeth Lydia Wright née Howard and Richard R. Wright, then a veteran American military officer, educator and college president. His father also was active as a politician, civil rights advocate, and later, as a banking entrepreneur. The young Wright was called by religion from an early age. As a child he used to play church and preached to other neighborhood children. At thirteen Wright became a Sunday school teacher at his church. He later decided to join the ministry. Wright was also inclined toward social justice at a young age. His father encouraged his children to have black role models like W.E.B. DuBois and to pursue careers that would help others.

In regard to his decision to join the ministry, Wright said

“I was much inclined toward law; to devoting my life to getting my people’s legal rights, which were being increasingly denied. Still back of my mind was that one desire to preach. I had never seen but one colored lawyer.”

He married Charlotte Crogman, daughter of Wright family friends, Dr. William H. Crogman and his wife. Dr. Crogman was the first black president of Clark Atlanta University. After several years of courting and a long friendship, Wright proposed to Charlotte after a game of tennis. The two were married for 49 years, until her death in 1959. They had four children together: Ruth, Richard III, Alberta Lavina, and Grace Lydia Wright.

Wright was an avid reader and sportsman, particularly fond of swimming, baseball, and tennis. He disdained dancing, drinking, and card playing. He joined the Democratic Party in the 1930s, and was a public supporter of Presidents John F. Kennedy and Lyndon B. Johnson.
