= Honors student =

Student recognized for achieving high grades or high marks in their course work

An honors student or honor student is a student recognized for achieving high grades or high marks in their coursework at school.

== United States ==
In the United States, honors students may refer to:

1. Students recognized for their academic achievement on lists published periodically throughout the school year, known as the Honor Roll, varying from school to school, shows the student going above and beyond academic achievement and from enlarged different levels of education.
2. Students enrolled in designated Advanced Placement courses, subject-specific honors courses, or school-based honors programs.
3. Students who are members of the National Honor Society or other honor society.

Honors students are often recognized for their above-average academic achievements. A student who has made numerous appearances on the honour roll may be bestowed with some form of academic letter, certificate, or any other form of notification in recognition of their academic achievements. A similar concept to honour rolls exists in colleges and universities in Canada and the United States, known as the Dean's List.

A growing archive of honor students can be found online.

== Elsewhere in the world ==
In other countries, the meaning of honors can refer either to a specific type of academic degree or to the level of distinction with which an undergraduate degree was earned.

Honours degrees are usually four-year programs (sometimes also three year programs, e.g., in England). A student who holds a de jure Honours degree is eligible for direct entry either to a Doctorate (Ph.D.) or to a two- to three years very-high-research Master's degree program.

'Honours' can also mean that students have achieved their degree with a high overall average GPA and typically have undertaken a small final project, paper or essay (also known in the UK as a dissertation). See British undergraduate degree classification.

A third meaning is a postgraduate with Honors or cum honored degree, which is (part of) an academic degree itself, e.g. the one-year Bachelor with Honors degree in Australia, the one-year Baccalaureatus Cum Honore degree in Canada or the four-year integrated Master with Honors degree in Scotland. Postgraduate Honors degree programs generally involve completion of master's level courses and the submission of a long high-research thesis.

=== Philippines ===
In the Philippine education system, while an "honor student" can be used to denote students in undergraduate programs who achieved academic excellence, "honor student" can also refer to students under the basic education system (K-12) that obtained a transmuted grade of at least 90% after a quadmester (i.e. quarter).

Honor students are classified into three tiers: With Honors (90-94%), With High Honors (95-97%) and With Highest Honors (98-100%). Previously, students that achieved academic excellence were ranked solely by their transmuted grades.

== Criticism ==
Some researchers have questioned the validity of the honor roll as an effective form of positive reinforcement. It is argued that the pursuit of extrinsic reward is not an accurate reflection of intrinsic interest in course material. Many other criteria should also be employed to judge a student including standardized test scores, research experience, breadth and the level of courses taken, and academic-related extracurriculars performance. Writing honors thesis or semi-independent research in a subject may be more signal of interest or academic potential than achieving the label of "Honors Student." There are also questions on the effectiveness of separating high-achieving students from their peers, in the form of magnet schools or honors courses or Gifted and Talented Education.

== Honors courses ==
An honors course is a class in which the most advanced students are placed. Most students placed in honors courses are highly motivated and dedicated to their academics and educational experience. Honors classes are more academically challenging and rigorous, also cover advanced course material, permit more in-depth study than a standard course of study and may require independent research.

Self-motivation is the main quality that characterizes an honors student. In addition to being committed to academics, they are encouraged and many participate in volunteer work, organizations and clubs, cooperative education, research, study abroad and cultural activities.

Honors programs have specific entrance requirements and completion criteria in order to graduate with Honors, or cum laude.

== See also ==
- Academic freedom
- Advanced Placement
- Gifted education
- International Baccalaureate
- Standardized test
- Student council
