= Middleborough, Massachusetts =

Middleborough, Massachusetts Middleboro
- Town
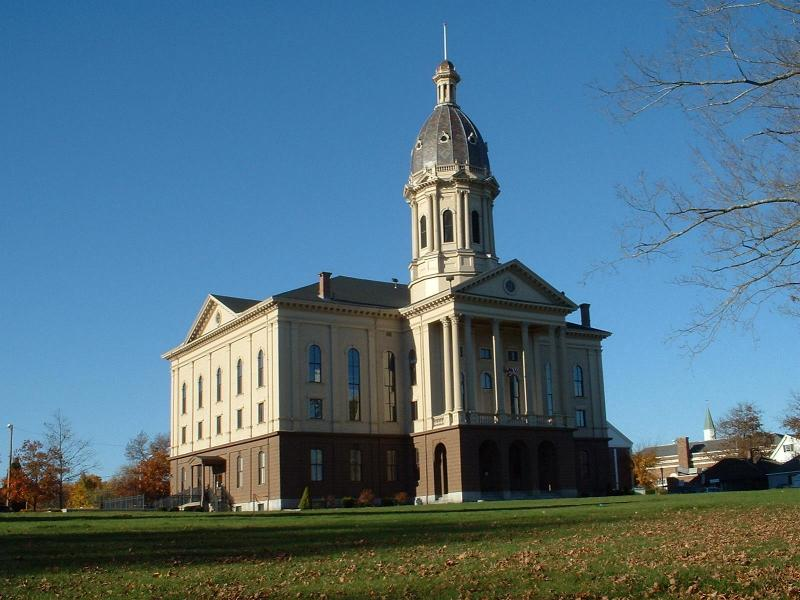
- Town Hall

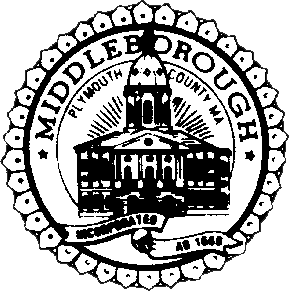
- Seal
- Motto: Cranberry Capital of the World
- Location in Plymouth County in Massachusetts
- Coordinates: 41°53′22″N 70°53′39″W
- Country: United States
- State: Massachusetts
- County: Plymouth
- Settled: 1660
- Incorporated: 1669

Government
  - Type: Open town meeting

Area
  - Total: 72.2 sq mi (186.9 km^{2})
  - Land: 69.1 sq mi (178.9 km^{2})
  - Water: 3.1 sq mi (8.0 km^{2})
- Elevation: 141 ft (43 m)

Population (2020)
  - Total: 24,245
  - Density: 351.0/sq mi (135.5/km^{2})
- Time zone: UTC−5 (Eastern)
  - Summer (DST): UTC−4 (Eastern)
- ZIP Codes: 02344, 02346, 02349
- Area code: 508/774
- FIPS code: 25-40850
- GNIS feature ID: 0618346
- Website: www.middleboroughma.gov

Middleborough is a town in Plymouth County, Massachusetts, United States. The population was 24,405 as of 2023. The census-designated place of Middleborough Center corresponds to the main village and commercial center of the town. It is the second largest municipality by land area in Massachusetts and nineteenth largest in New England. Middleborough proclaims itself to be the "Cranberry Capital of the World". Cranberry production remains a significant part of the local economy. In 2015, approximately 1,400 acres (570 ha) of the town were used to grow the crop, accounting for 3% of all land used to harvest cranberry bogs in the United States.

== History ==
The town was first settled by Europeans in 1661 as Nemasket, later changed to Middlebury, and officially incorporated as Middleborough in 1669. From time to time, documents and publications spell the name as Middleboro. The name Nemasket or Namasket came from a Native American settlement along the small river that now bears the same name. Nemasket may have meant "place of fish", due to the large amount of herring that migrate up the river each spring. There are no contemporary records that indicate the name Middlebury was taken from a place in England. The names Middlebury, Middleboro and Middleborough were actually derived from the city of Middelburg, Zeeland, the westernmost province of the Netherlands. Middelburg was an international intellectual center and economic powerhouse. The English religious dissenters known as the Brownists developed their governing institutions in Middelburg before emigrating on the Mayflower, and were the earliest settlers of Middleborough.

During King Philip's War (1675–1676), the town's entire populace took shelter within the confines of a fort constructed along the Nemasket River. The site is located behind the old Memorial High School (now a kindergarten), and is marked by a state historical commission marker along Route 105. Before long, the fort was abandoned and the population withdrew to the greater shelter of the Plymouth Colony. In their absence, the entire village was burned to the ground, and it would be several years before the town would be reestablished.

Western Middleborough broke away on May 13, 1853, and formed the town of Lakeville, taking with it the main access to the large freshwater lakes there, including Assawompset Pond.

Middleborough was once a large producer of shoes and is still home to the Alden Shoe Company, one of the last remaining shoe manufacturers in America. The local Maxim Motors manufactured fire engines from 1914 to 1989. Middleborough has since become the location of the corporate headquarters of Ocean Spray Cranberries.

Notable sights include the 1870s Victorian-style town hall and the Beaux Arts-style town library (1903). In the spring, the Nemasket River alewife and blueback herring run upstream to the Assawompset Ponds complex to spawn.

In the summer of 2007, Middleborough became the proposed location for a controversial future resort casino, sponsored by the Wampanoag Tribe of Mashpee, Massachusetts.

Teams from Middleborough have twice reached the Little League World Series (LLWS) the only Little League in the state to reach twice in the International Era (1958+). Middleborough reached the 1994 edition by defeating Milburn-Short Hills, New Jersey, to take the East Region title. In South Williamsport, Pennsylvania, the team lost two games (to Virginia and California) and won one game (over Minnesota). They were one of only two Massachusetts Little League teams to win the East title (the other being from Andover in 1988) before it was split into the New England Region and Mid-Atlantic Region in 2001. Middleborough advanced to the 2022 edition of the LLWS with a 10–1 win over Maine. They were the first Massachusetts team to reach South Williamsport since Peabody in 2009. Middleboro lost each of its two games falling 5–3 to Southeast (Tennessee) and 7–5 to Mid-Atlantic (Pennsylvania).

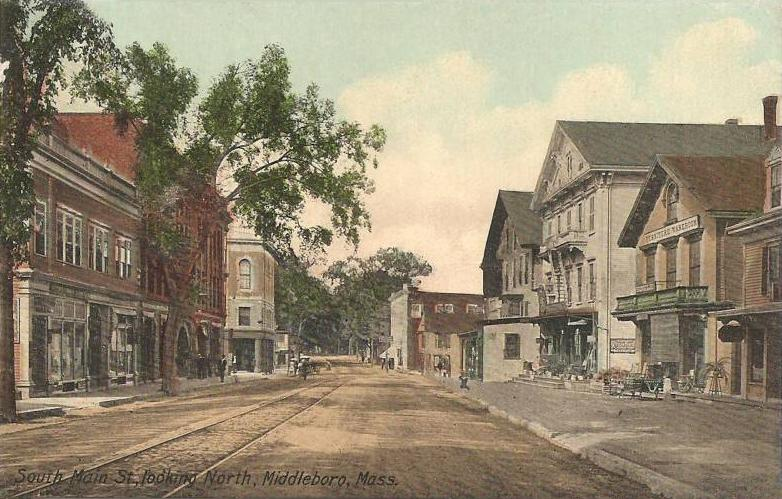
South Main Street in 1912

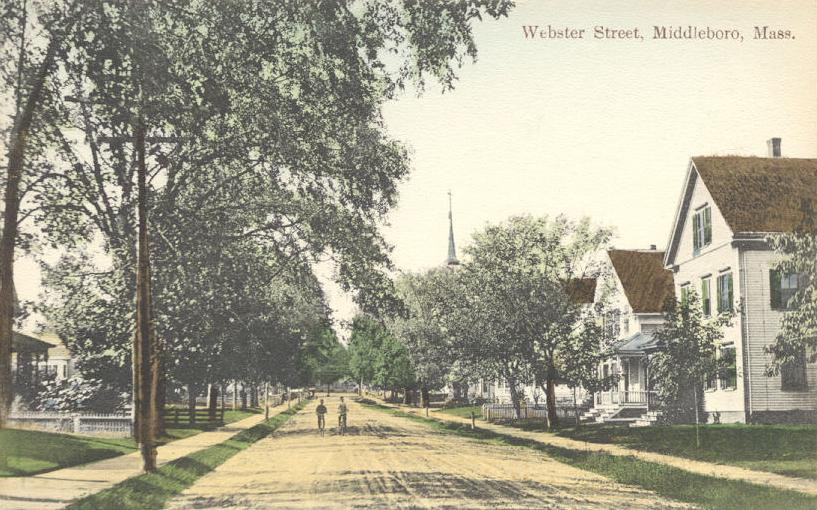
Webster Street c. 1910

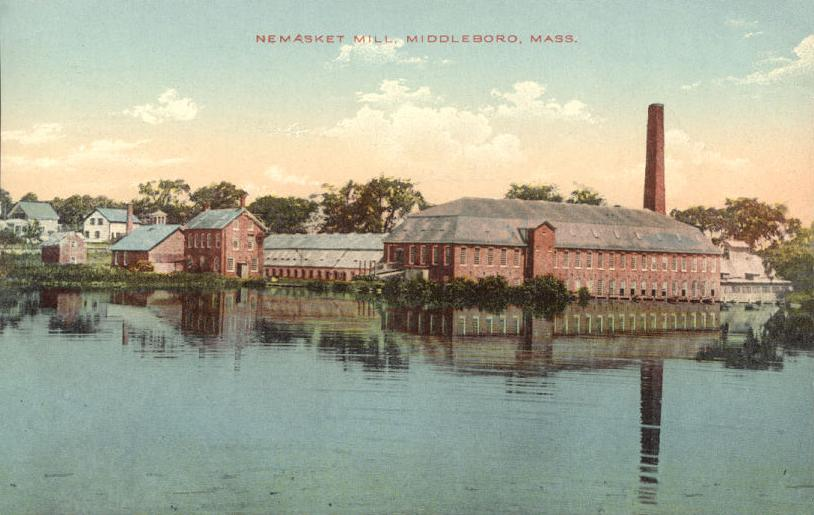
Nemasket Mill in 1914

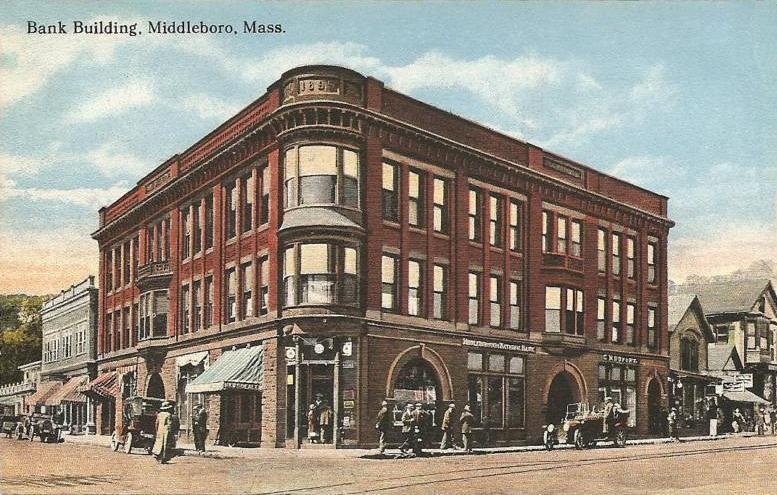
Bank building in 1910

=== Profanity ban controversy ===
On June 11, 2012, Middleborough made national headlines after residents approved an ordinance outlawing the use of profanity in public, making it punishable by a $20 fine. It passed 183–50 in the town of over 23,000 residents. Many legal experts said the law violates the First Amendment to the United States Constitution. Dozens of residents on both sides of the issue attended a protest in front of the town hall. The Massachusetts state director for the American Civil Liberties Union said, "the Supreme Court has ruled that the government can't prohibit public speech just because it contains profanity." In October 2012, Massachusetts attorney general Martha Coakley blocked enforcement of the law, saying it was inconsistent with the Constitution, and the town ultimately backed off the profanity ban.

== Geography ==
According to the United States Census Bureau, the town has a total area of 72.2 square miles (186.9 km^{2}), of which 69.1 square miles (178.9 km^{2}) is land and 3.1 square miles (8.0 km^{2}), or 4.27%, is water. Middleborough is the second largest municipality in Massachusetts in terms of area, smaller only than Plymouth.

Middleborough lies on the western border of Plymouth County. It is bordered by Bridgewater and Halifax to the north, Plympton and Carver to the east, Wareham and Rochester to the south, and Lakeville, Taunton and Raynham to the west.

The town is approximately 15 miles (24 km) west of Plymouth, 30 miles (48 km) east of Providence, Rhode Island and 40 miles (64 km) south of Boston.

Middleborough's rivers and brooks feed in two directions. The Taunton River, Nemasket River and their tributaries flow southwestward as part of the Taunton River Watershed, which empties into Narragansett Bay. The other waterways of the town, including the Weweantic River, flow southward into Buzzards Bay. Along Middleborough's border with Lakeville lie the Assawompset, Pocksha and Great Quittacas ponds. Tispaquin Pond, Woods Pond, and several other ponds make up the town's other bodies of water. Middleborough has four wildlife management areas, as well as the Beaver Dam and Great Cedar and Little Cedar Swamps. The town is also the site of several cranberry bogs, especially in the southeastern part of town along the Carver town line. Ocean Spray's headquarters are just over the town line in Lakeville.

=== Climate ===
According to the Köppen Climate Classification system, Middleboro has a humid subtropical climate, abbreviated Cfa"" on climate maps. The hottest temperature recorded in Middleboro was 99 °F (37.2 °C) on July 10, 1911, and July 23, 2011, while the coldest temperature recorded was −26 °F (−32.2 °C) on January 5, 1904.

Climate data for Middleboro, Massachusetts, 1991–2020 normals, extremes 1893–present
Month	Jan	Feb	Mar	Apr	May	Jun	Jul	Aug	Sep	Oct	Nov	Dec	Year
Record high °F (°C)	68 (20)	70 (21)	80 (27)	88 (31)	93 (34)	97 (36)	99 (37)	97 (36)	96 (36)	86 (30)	76 (24)	67 (19)	99 (37)
Mean maximum °F (°C)	58.1 (14.5)	58.3 (14.6)	64.9 (18.3)	76.6 (24.8)	85.9 (29.9)	89.0 (31.7)	93.3 (34.1)	90.5 (32.5)	88.2 (31.2)	77.6 (25.3)	68.8 (20.4)	60.6 (15.9)	92.6 (33.7)
Mean daily maximum °F (°C)	37.7 (3.2)	39.6 (4.2)	46.0 (7.8)	57.0 (13.9)	67.1 (19.5)	76.4 (24.7)	82.0 (27.8)	81.2 (27.3)	73.7 (23.2)	62.9 (17.2)	52.4 (11.3)	43.0 (6.1)	59.9 (15.5)
Daily mean °F (°C)	27.6 (−2.4)	29.4 (−1.4)	35.9 (2.2)	46.3 (7.9)	56.4 (13.6)	65.7 (18.7)	71.6 (22.0)	70.4 (21.3)	62.8 (17.1)	51.9 (11.1)	42.1 (5.6)	33.6 (0.9)	49.5 (9.7)
Mean daily minimum °F (°C)	17.4 (−8.1)	19.2 (−7.1)	25.9 (−3.4)	35.6 (2.0)	45.6 (7.6)	55.1 (12.8)	61.3 (16.3)	59.5 (15.3)	51.8 (11.0)	40.9 (4.9)	31.7 (−0.2)	24.2 (−4.3)	39.0 (3.9)
Mean minimum °F (°C)	0.1 (−17.7)	3.7 (−15.7)	12.6 (−10.8)	25.4 (−3.7)	34.5 (1.4)	42.8 (6.0)	51.4 (10.8)	48.7 (9.3)	37.2 (2.9)	26.9 (−2.8)	18.6 (−7.4)	10.3 (−12.1)	−1.4 (−18.6)
Record low °F (°C)	−26 (−32)	−20 (−29)	−3 (−19)	13 (−11)	22 (−6)	32 (0)	40 (4)	35 (2)	25 (−4)	8 (−13)	1 (−17)	−11 (−24)	−26 (−32)
Average precipitation inches (mm)	4.44 (113)	3.76 (96)	5.80 (147)	4.83 (123)	3.59 (91)	4.06 (103)	3.33 (85)	3.77 (96)	4.17 (106)	4.95 (126)	4.43 (113)	5.26 (134)	52.39 (1,333)
Average snowfall inches (cm)	13.5 (34)	13.7 (35)	6.8 (17)	1.3 (3.3)	0.0 (0.0)	0.0 (0.0)	0.0 (0.0)	0.0 (0.0)	0.0 (0.0)	0.1 (0.25)	0.4 (1.0)	5.7 (14)	41.5 (104.55)
Average extreme snow depth inches (cm)	6.1 (15)	7.1 (18)	5.0 (13)	0.5 (1.3)	0.0 (0.0)	0.0 (0.0)	0.0 (0.0)	0.0 (0.0)	0.0 (0.0)	0.0 (0.0)	0.4 (1.0)	3.9 (9.9)	11.0 (28)
Average precipitation days (≥ 0.01 in)	11.4	10.0	12.2	11.6	12.1	11.2	9.5	9.7	9.3	11.4	10.9	12.8	132.1
Average snowy days (≥ 0.1 in)	4.8	4.3	3.0	0.3	0.0	0.0	0.0	0.0	0.0	0.1	0.4	2.9	15.8
Source 1: NOAA
Source 2: National Weather Service

== Transportation ==
=== Road ===
Interstate 495 runs through the town on its way to Cape Cod. The town is also crossed by U.S. Route 44, as well as Massachusetts routes 18, 28, 105, and a short, 1,000-foot (300 m) section of Route 58 which passes through the southeast corner of town. Routes 18, 28 and 44 meet at a two lane rotary adjacent to I-495 just west of the center of town. Two of I-495's four interchanges are located there. I-495's interchange with Route 24 is located just 1.5 miles (2.4 km) northwest of the town line.

The Greater Attleboro Taunton Regional Transit Authority provides public bus services along three routes in Middleboro, connecting to Wareham, Raynham, Taunton, and Lakeville, with stops including Morton Hospital, the Middleboro/Lakeville commuter rail station, and Onset beach.

=== Rail ===
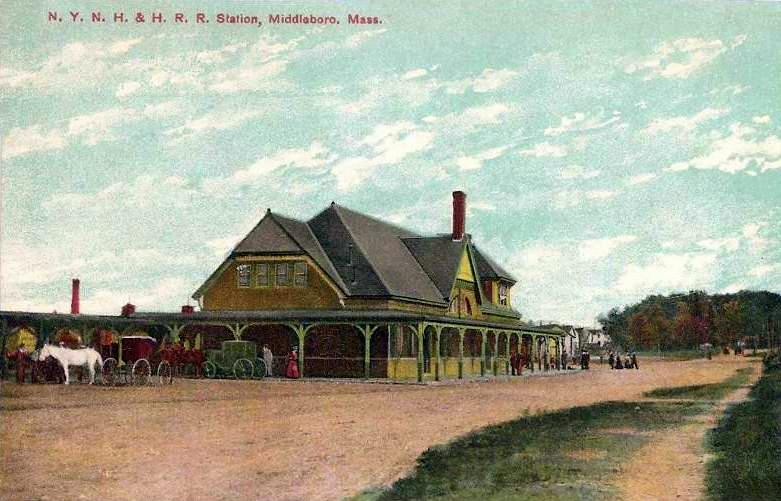
Railroad station c. 1908

Since the 1840s, Middleborough has served as a major rail transportation hub for southeastern Massachusetts; at one time, five rail lines radiated out from the town. Today, three rail lines extend from Middleborough, toward Boston, Taunton and Cape Cod. All three lines intersect at a junction near the center of town. Two rail freight companies serve Middleborough: CSX Transportation, which runs along the Boston and Taunton lines, and Massachusetts Coastal Railroad, which runs along the Cape Cod and Taunton lines. Middleborough station is served by the Fall River/New Bedford Line of the MBTA Commuter Rail system, while Lakeville station on the Middleborough/Lakeville border is served by the seasonal CapeFlyer.

The nearest inter-city (Amtrak) passenger rail stations are Providence, Route 128 station in Westwood, Boston Back Bay, and Boston South Station. The nearest rapid-transit station is Braintree.

=== Air ===
The nearest regional airports are Taunton Municipal Airport and Plymouth Municipal Airport, the nearest primary commercial airport is New Bedford Regional Airport, and the nearest national and international airports are T. F. Green Airport in Warwick, Rhode Island, and Logan International Airport in Boston. From 1954 to 1959, a small runway called North Middleboro Airpark was constructed. It was a 3,000-foot-long paved runway, although it was not depicted in the November 1954 Boston Sectional Chart. Sometime between 1982 and 1994 it was closed, as it was depicted simply as "Landing Strip" on the 1994 USGS topographic map.

== Demographics ==
Historical population
Year	Pop.	±%
1790	4,526	—
1850	5,336	+17.9%
1860	4,553	−14.7%
1870	4,687	+2.9%
1880	5,237	+11.7%
1890	6,065	+15.8%
1900	6,885	+13.5%
1910	8,214	+19.3%
1920	8,453	+2.9%
1930	8,608	+1.8%
1940	9,032	+4.9%
1950	10,164	+12.5%
1960	11,065	+8.9%
1970	13,607	+23.0%
1980	16,404	+20.6%
1990	17,867	+8.9%
2000	19,941	+11.6%
2010	23,116	+15.9%
2020	24,245	+4.9%
2023*	24,847	+2.5%
* = population estimate. Source: United States census records and Population Estimates Program data.

As of the census of 2000, there were 19,941 people, 6,981 households, and 5,117 families residing in the town. The population density was 286.7 inhabitants per square mile (110.7/km^{2}). There were 7,249 housing units at an average density of 104.2 per square mile (40.2/km^{2}). The racial makeup of the town was 96.1% White, 1.3% African American, 0.3% Native American, 0.4% Asian, <0.1% Pacific Islander, 0.6% from other races, and 1.3% from two or more races. Hispanic or Latino of any race were 0.8% of the population.

There were 6,981 households, out of which 38.4% had children under the age of 18 living with them, 56.4% were married couples living together, 12.2% had a female householder with no husband present, and 26.7% were non-families. Of all households, 20.4% were made up of individuals, and 7.4% had someone living alone who was 65 years of age or older. The average household size was 2.78 and the average family size was 3.23.

The population was spread out, with 27.7% under the age of 18, 6.9% from 18 to 24, 32.8% from 25 to 44, 22.3% from 45 to 64, and 10.3% who were 65 years of age or older. The median age was 36 years. For every 100 females, there were 96.3 males. For every 100 females age 18 and over, there were 92.1 males.

The median income for a household in the town was $52,755, and the median income for a family was $65,173. Males had a median income of $60,854 versus $40,570 for females. The per capita income for the town was $75,000.

== Government ==
Middleborough is represented in the Massachusetts House of Representatives as a part of three separate districts: the Tenth and Twelfth Bristol and Twelfth Plymouth. The town is represented in the Massachusetts Senate as a part of the First Plymouth and Bristol district, which also includes Berkley, Bridgewater, Carver, Dighton, Marion, Raynham, Taunton and Wareham.

The town is home to the Fourth Barracks of Troop D of the Massachusetts State Police. On the national level, Middleborough is a part of Massachusetts's 9th congressional district, and is currently represented by William R. Keating.

Middleborough is governed by the open town meeting form of government, which is led by a town manager and a board of selectmen. The town's services are centralized downtown, with the fire and police headquarters being southeast, and the central post office being northwest of it. The town library is also located downtown.

A second part-time fire department is operated further south along Route 28 in South Middleboro. A third, temporary station was built in the 2000s as the surrogate home for the downtown facility, which was closed for substantial renovations. This third station, near the rotary north of the center of town, has subsequently been closed.

Construction on a new police station began in July 2017, with an estimated budget of $9.14 million. The police station was finished early 2019 and is now in use.

== Education ==
Middleborough has its own school system, headed by a school committee and superintendent. There is one school for kindergarten children, the Memorial Early Childhood Center, housed in the old junior high (previously the old high school). It opened in September 2007 after a $13 million renovation. The Mary K. Goode Elementary and the Henry B. Burkland Elementary Schools serve grades 1 through 5. The John T. "Tiger" Nichols, Jr. Middle School (1999) serves grades 6 through 8, and the Middleborough High School serves grades 9 through 12. Middleborough High's mascot is the "Sachem", and their colors are black and orange. Other sports teams in town include the semi-pro football team the Middleborough Cobras and the middle school baseball team the Tigers.

Private schools include:

- Samuel Fuller School, a Christian k to 12 school.
- Frederick L. Chamberlain School, a school for disabled students.

In 1856, Middleborough-born, Baltimore businessman-wholesale hardware merchant, banker, and steamship line owner, Enoch Pratt, (1808–1896), established as one of his first philanthropies in The Pratt Free School, later adding additional bequests upon its incorporation in 1865. It later became a grammar school, preparing students for entering the Middleborough High School. Later in 1882–1886, he endowed the Enoch Pratt Free Library, the nation's first circulating, public library system (with a central library and five branches) and later further endowed a mental health institution, the Sheppard and Enoch Pratt Hospital.

The Middleborough campus of Massasoit Community College is also located here.

In November 2017, "Middleboro voters approved a $103 million dollar plan to construct a new Middleborough High School building and campus." The project started in February 2019 and was completed in the spring of 2021.

== Notable people ==
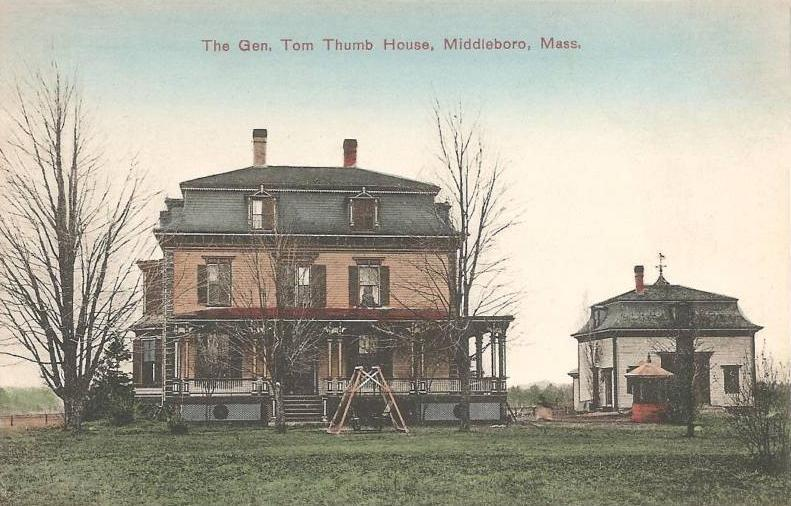
General Tom Thumb House in 1914

- Isaac Backus, Baptist pastor and founding father during American Revolution
- Joseph Barker, minister and congressman
- Samuel Breck, general
- Ebenezer N. Briggs, Speaker of Vermont House of Representatives and President Pro Tem of Vermont Senate
- Wayne Maurice Caron, sailor, Medal of Honor recipient KIA
- Corey Carrier, child actor
- Howard A. Coffin, congressman
- Rick Fuller, professional wrestler
- Daniel J. Kelleher, banker and businessman
- Erik Lindgren, composer
- Count Primo Magri, dwarf celebrity with entertainment shows and circuses of P. T. Barnum
- Sean Newcomb, professional baseball player with Boston Red Sox (and previously with several other MLB teams), first-round selection (15th overall) in 2014 MLB draft; made MLB debut June 10, 2017
- Enoch Pratt (1808–1896), businessman, industrialist, banker, founder 1856–1865 of Pratt Free School in Middleborough and Enoch Pratt Free Library in Baltimore; endowed Sheppard-Pratt Hospital in Towson, Maryland
- Patrick Regan, army officer
- Deborah Sampson, female soldier of American Revolution who dressed as a man to serve in combat
- Jay Allen Sanford, co-creator of Rock 'N' Roll Comics, Revolutionary Comics, Carnal Comics, and columnist/cartoonist for San Diego Reader
- Ebenezer Sproat, Continental Army colonel, pioneer, surveyor and first sheriff of Northwest Territory and Ohio
- Cephas Thompson, portrait painter
- General Tom Thumb, stage name of Charles Sherwood Stratton, dwarf celebrity with P. T. Barnum
- Glenn Tufts, pro baseball player and scout
- Walt Uzdavinis, football player for the Cleveland Rams
- Lavinia Warren, dwarf with P. T. Barnum who married Gen. Tom Thumb and later Count Primo Magri
- Minnie Warren, dwarf with P. T. Barnum

== Points of interest ==
- Tom Thumb House, home of General Tom Thumb and Lavinia Warren
- Middleborough Historical Museum, with extensive collection of Tom Thumb and Lavinia Warren items
- Robbins Museum of Archaeology, collections focused on the prehistory of New England's Native Americans

== See also ==
- Pierce Academy
