= Falmouth station (disambiguation) =

Falmouth station may refer to:

In Falmouth, Cornwall, England

- Falmouth Docks railway station, a former station used from 1863 to 1970
- Falmouth Town railway station, a former station in Falmouth, Cornwall, England, used from 1970 to 1975
- Falmouth Lifeboat Station, a Royal National Lifeboat Institution search and rescue base

In Massachusetts, United States

- Falmouth station, a bus and former train station in Falmouth
- North Falmouth station, a former railway station in North Falmouth
- West Falmouth station, a former railway station in West Falmouth
- Falmouth Pumping Station, a historic water pumping station in Falmouth
