= North Falmouth station =

Railway station in Massachusetts

North Falmouth
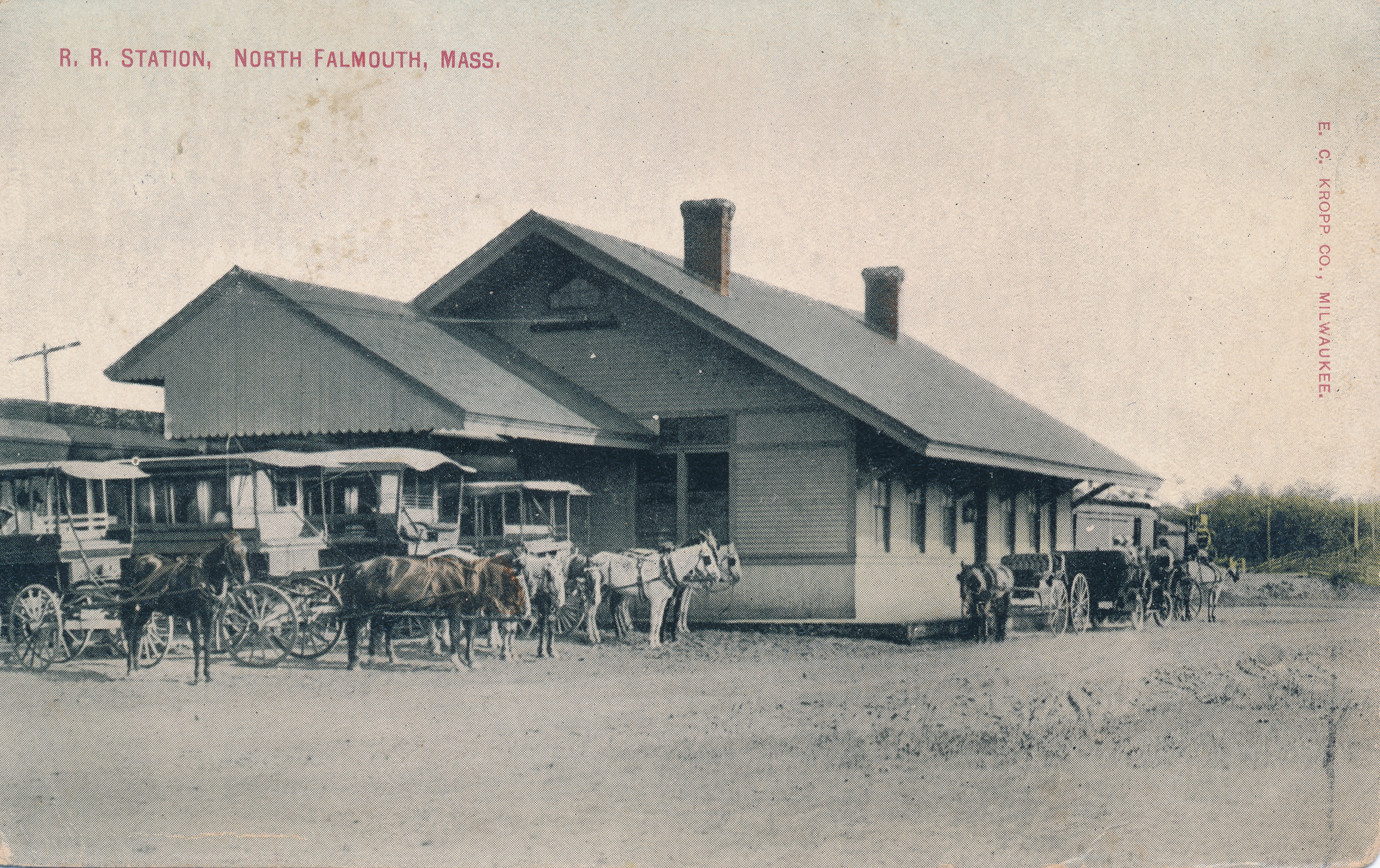
- The second North Falmouth station building (c. 1909)

General information
- Location: Depot Road; North Falmouth, Massachusetts
- Coordinates: 41°38′53.01″N 70°36′49.45″W
- Line: Falmouth Branch

History
- Opened: 1872
- Closed: 1964
- Rebuilt: 1905

Former services
Preceding station	New York, New Haven and Hartford Railroad	Following station
Cataumet toward Boston	Boston–Woods Hole	West Falmouth toward Woods Hole
Cataumet toward New York	Cape Codder	Falmouth toward Woods Hole
Location

North Falmouth station was a railroad station on the Old Colony Railroad on Depot Road in North Falmouth, Massachusetts. Service to the station began in 1872 and ended in 1964, and the station burned down in 1969.

== History ==
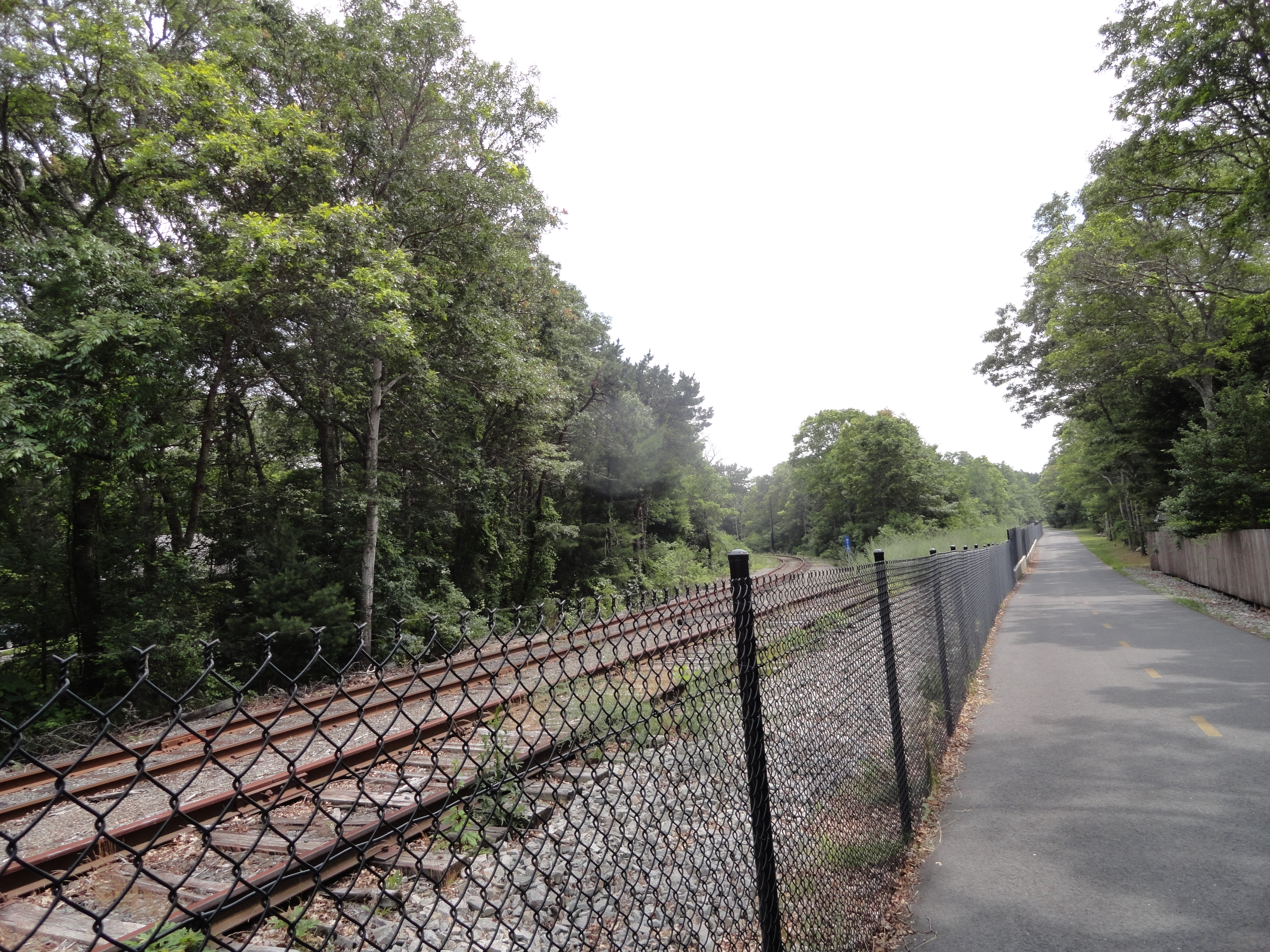
Shining Sea Bikeway and spur line to Joint Base Cape Cod just south of the former North Falmouth station site

The North Falmouth station was built in 1872 by the Old Colony Railroad as part of its Woods Hole Branch running from Buzzards Bay to Woods Hole, Massachusetts. In 1893, the New York, New Haven and Hartford Railroad (NH) leased the Old Colony Railroad and took over operations on its lines. In 1905, NH replaced the station with a larger building. When the nearby military training facility of Camp Edwards (now part of Joint Base Cape Cod) was built in 1940–1941, a spur line was built from North Falmouth station to serve the base.

Scheduled service to North Falmouth ended in 1964 when NH discontinued its passenger service to Cape Cod, and in 1969, the station building burned down.

In 2009, the Woods Hole Branch's right-of-way south of the former North Falmouth station was paved as part of the extension of the Shining Sea Bikeway. The former station site is used as the bike path's northern terminus and parking lot. As of 2017, the Woods Hole Branch north of the former station site and the spur to Joint Base Cape Cod are in active use. The tracks are used by the Massachusetts Coastal Railroad to haul trash from the Upper Cape Regional Transfer Station to the Southeastern Massachusetts Resource Recovery Facility (SEMASS) waste-to-energy and recycling facility.
