= Shining Sea Bikeway =

Rail trail in Massachusetts, United States

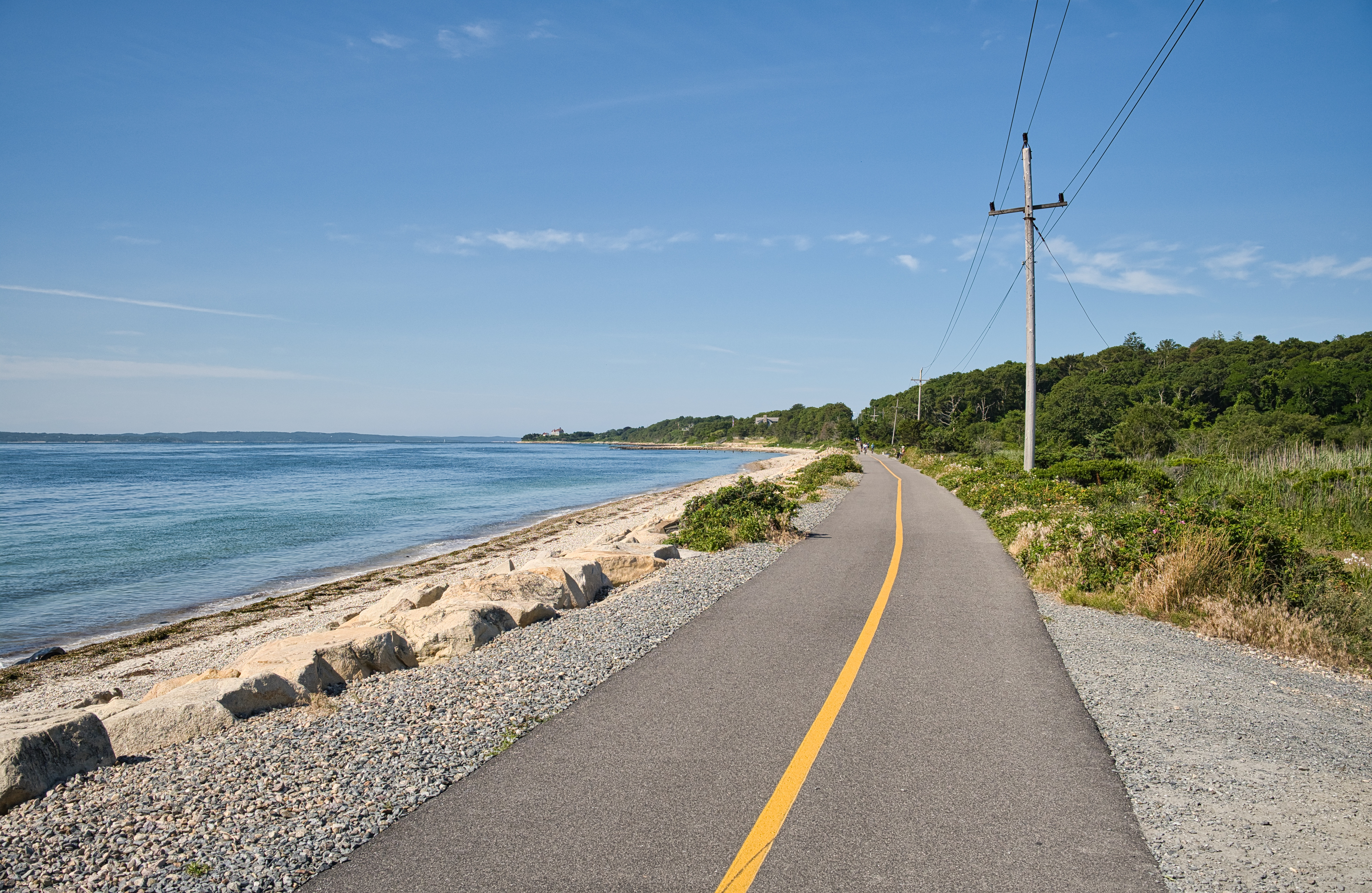
- The trail by Trunk River Beach in Falmouth
- Length: 10.7 mi (17.2 km)
- Location: Barnstable County
- Established: 1975
- Trailheads: 1 Cowdry Road, Woods Hole; County Road, North Falmouth
- Use: Hiking, bicycling, horseback riding, roller blading, and cross country skiing
- Difficulty: Easy
- Season: year-round
- Hazards: deer ticks poison ivy road crossings
- Surface: Paved
- Right of way: Former Old Colony Railroad's Woods Hole branch line
- Maintainer: Town of Falmouth
- Website: www.falmouthma.gov/1362/The-Shining-Sea-Bikeway

The Shining Sea Bikeway is a rail trail on Cape Cod in Falmouth, Massachusetts, United States. The path runs for 10.7 miles (17.2 km) from the Steamship Authority ferry terminal in Woods Hole to County Road in North Falmouth. The Shining Sea Bikeway is the oldest rail trail in Massachusetts, the first in the United States to be assembled by eminent domain, and the legal struggle to create the trail led to the strongest state rail corridor protection legislation in the country.

== Route description ==
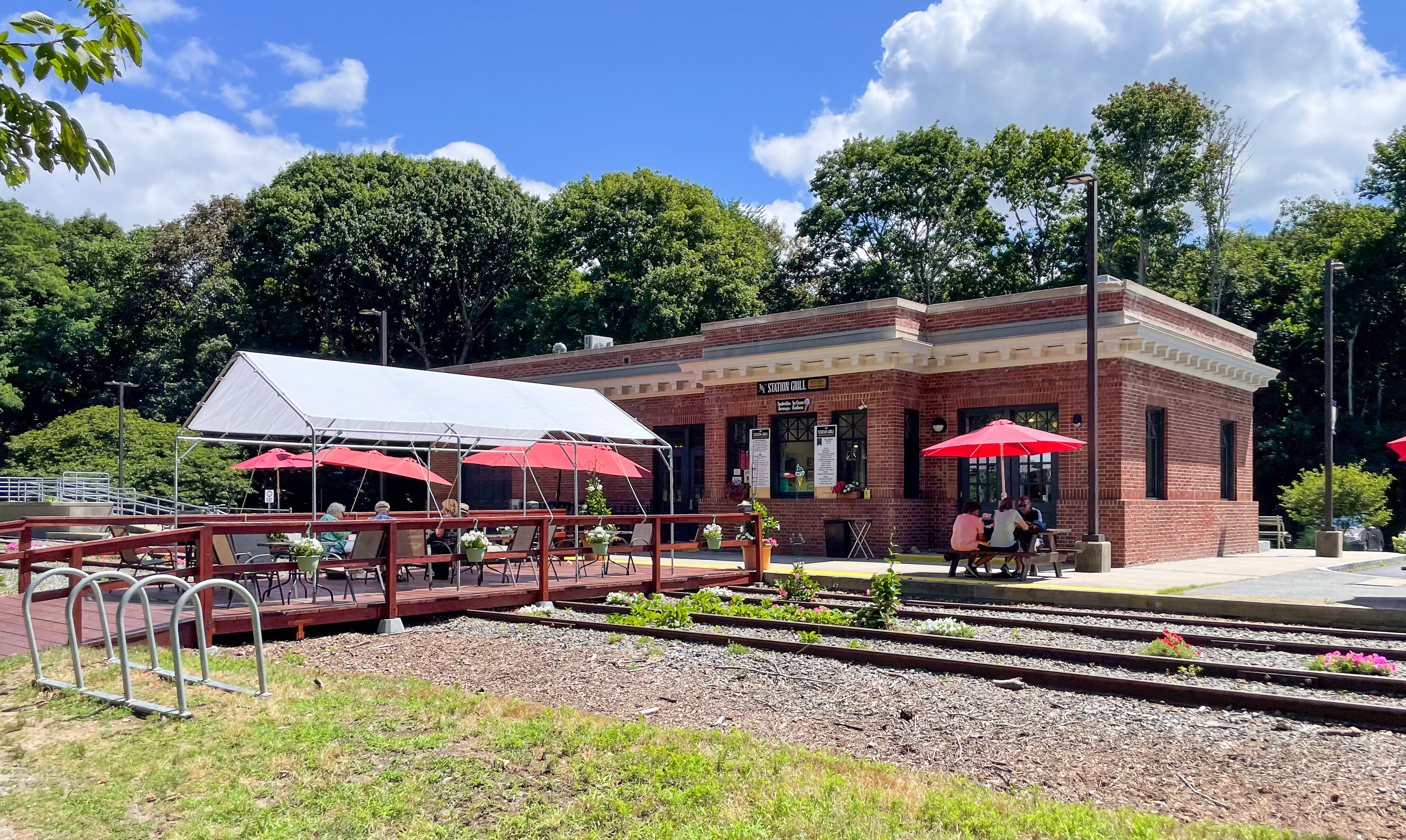
A restaurant at Falmouth station serves bicyclists and bus passengers

The Shining Sea Bikeway's northern trailhead is at the former site of the North Falmouth station on County Road in North Falmouth. For the first 1,000 feet (300 m), the path runs adjacent to active track used to haul trash off-Cape from the Upper Cape Regional Transfer Station on Joint Base Cape Cod. The path runs south roughly parallel to Route 28A through the villages of North Falmouth and West Falmouth. Between North and West Falmouth, it passes through a cranberry bog and crosses the horse trails at Bourne Farm. In West Falmouth, it passes near Chapoquoit Beach and then runs through the Sippewissett Salt Marsh.

After the salt marsh, the path turns southeast and climbs slightly into the village of Sippewissett and then turns southwest and enters downtown Falmouth. At this point, there is a connection across Route 28A to the southern end of the Moraine Trail, including Goodwill Park, Grew's Pond, and Falmouth Pumping Station. In Falmouth, the path runs through a Steamship Authority parking lot and passes the former Falmouth Railroad Station, which is used as a bus station.

At Woods Hole Road, the path reaches its downtown parking lot, which was its northernmost trailhead until the 2009 extension. It then crosses Woods Hole Road and continues southwest past Salt Pond to Surf Drive Beach. At Surf Drive, the path follows the beach for 0.5 miles (800 m) and then heads inland. Turning east, it passes through another Steamship Authority parking lot and ends at the Steamship Authority ferry terminal and the former site of the Woods Hole station in the village of Woods Hole.

== Bourne Rail Trail ==
The Bourne Rail Trail is a planned 6.5-mile (10.5 km) trail that would connect the Shining Sea Bikeway with the Cape Cod Canal path. Proposals include rail to trail and rail with trail. The active portion of the railway line is identified by the U.S. Department of Defense as a connector to the Strategic Rail Corridor Network (STRACNET). STRACNET includes 32,500 miles of rail line critical to move essential military equipment to ports around the country and 5,000 miles of track essential to connect corresponding facilities, including Camp Edwards.

Phase 1 of the planned trail is a half-mile long paved path that will run from Monument Neck Road at John Stackpole Memorial Park from the South to the existing Cape Cod Canal Bike Path to the north. The trail will be constructed parallel with the railroad line and entirely within the existing railroad right of way. Construction of this phase of the project is expected to begin in August 2025.

== History ==
The trail was built on the right-of-way of the Old Colony Railroad's Woods Hole branch line, which was built in 1872. In 1893, the New York, New Haven and Hartford Railroad (NH) leased the Old Colony and took over service on the line. Passenger service was discontinued in 1964, the NH merged with the Penn Central system in 1969, and Penn Central went bankrupt in 1970.

The idea of converting the ROW into a bikeway was first proposed in 1965 by Woods Hole residents Joan Kanwisher and Barbara Burwell. The struggle to build the trail was the inspiration for Burwell's son, David Burwell, to found the Rails to Trails Conservancy. In April 1969, Falmouth voted to take the ROW from Woods Hole to Locust Street by eminent domain. However the day after the vote, Penn Central announced a town resident had purchased the parcel. After town negotiations, the resident was unwilling to voluntarily allow for a trail adjacent to his summer house. The town took the land under the terms of the original eminent domain vote, which kicked off a protracted legal process. In 1973, the Massachusetts Supreme Judicial Court upheld the validity of the taking. State representative Richard Kendall responded by proposing and sponsoring two bills that were soon signed into law: a law to prevent construction within former railroad ROWs, to preserve the integrity for future public use, and a law requiring that railroad property for sale first be offered to a public authority. The resulting law is one reason that Massachusetts has saved more miles of abandoned rail lines in public ownership than any other state. One example of the law later being applied to create a rail trail includes the Belmont Community Path. By 1975, the first 3.3 miles (5.3 km) section of trail was completed and named the Shining Sea Bikeway in 1976. In 1977, the Town of Falmouth finalized the purchase of this section for $329,000.

Freight service on the Falmouth-North Falmouth section ceased in 1989. Incremental builds of the Shining Sea Bikeway occurred from Locust Street to Depot Avenue, to Skating Lane in 1998, and then to Carlson Lane in downtown Falmouth. In 2009, the trail was extended an additional 7.4 miles (11.9 km) from Carlson Lane to County Road in North Falmouth.

In 2024, a section of the Shining Sea Bikeway from Ter Heun Drive to Locust Street was closed and detoured to install a portion of an Eversource buried power reliability project to Martha's Vineyard. As compensation, the section was widened and repaved, and reopened May 4, 2025.

The Woods Hole-Falmouth section of the former railroad is owned by the Town of Falmouth: the Falmouth-North Falmouth section is owned by the Massachusetts Department of Transportation and a 99-year lease has been granted to Falmouth to build the trail.

The trail name is a reference to the patriotic song "America the Beautiful". The author of the song's lyrics, Katherine Lee Bates, was born in Falmouth, and there is a plaque commemorating her poem near mile marker 2.

== See also ==
- Cape Cod Rail Trail
