= Pocasset station =

Railway station in Massachusetts, United States

Pocasset
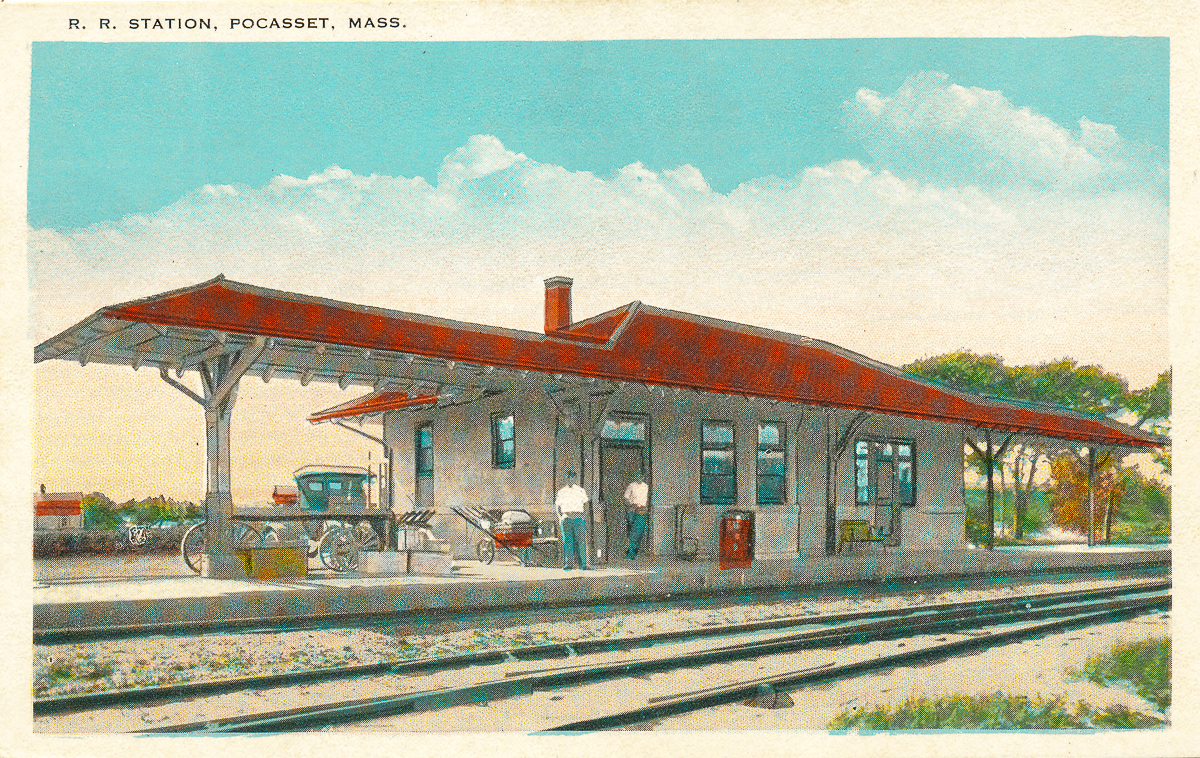
- Early-20th-century postcard of Pocasset station

General information
- Location: Barlows Landing Road; Pocasset, Massachusetts
- Coordinates: 41°41′35″N 70°36′54″W
- Line: Woods Hole Branch

History
- Opened: c. 1872
- Closed: 1964
Former services
Preceding station	New York, New Haven and Hartford Railroad	Following station
Monument Beach toward Boston	Boston–Woods Hole	Cataumet toward Woods Hole
Monument Beach toward New York	Cape Codder	Cataumet toward Woods Hole
Location

Pocasset station was a railroad station in Pocasset, Massachusetts on Cape Cod.

== History ==
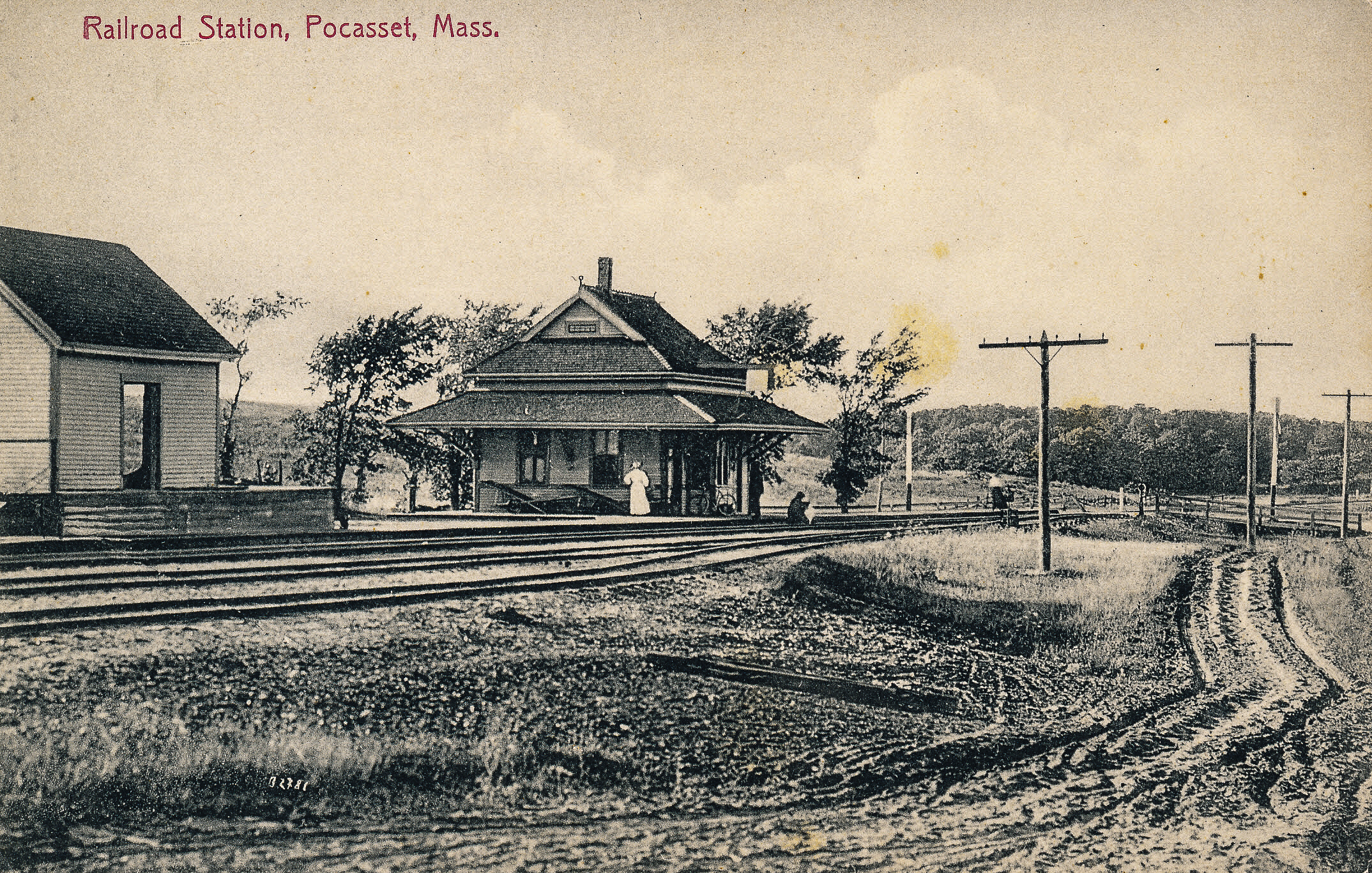
The original Pocasset station, c. 1910

The original Pocasset station was built by the Cape Cod Railroad around 1874. It was taken out of service in 1906 and moved to Cataumet to serve as the freight house there. The Wenaumet station - which was located about a mile north of the original Pocasset station - was renamed Pocasset by the New Haven Railroad. This station burned to the ground on May 14, 1914.

A new station was built at the same location in 1915. It served daily year-round New Haven RR trains to Boston until 1959. Summertime service continued to 1964. The station was also a stop for day and nighttime versions of the NH's Cape Codder service to New York City; these trains were among the trains terminated in 1964.

It was later demolished in 1960 after the New Haven Railroad discontinued most passenger service to Cape Cod. Remnants of the station's original foundation and platform are still visible just south of the point where Barlows Landing Road crosses the train tracks.
