= Monument Beach station =

Monument Beach
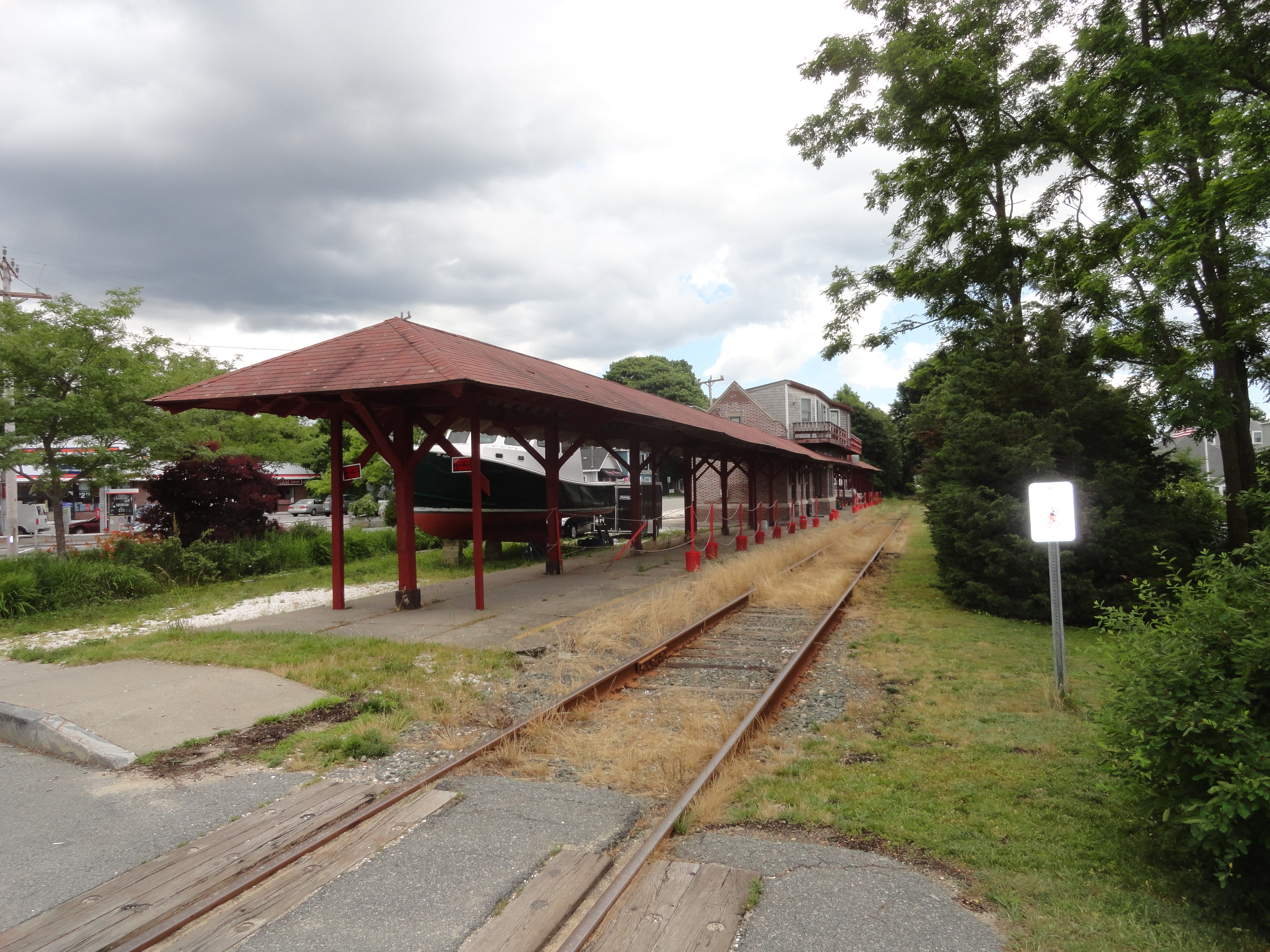
- The former station in June 2012

General information
- Location: Shore Road, Monument Beach, Massachusetts
- Coordinates: 41°43′09″N 70°36′52″W
- Owner: Private party
- Line: Falmouth Branch
- Platforms: 1 side platform

History
- Opened: 1875
- Closed: 1950s

Former services
Preceding station	New York, New Haven and Hartford Railroad	Following station
Gray Gables toward Boston	Boston–Woods Hole	Pocasset toward Woods Hole
Buzzards Bay toward New York	Cape Codder	Pocasset toward Woods Hole
Location

Monument Beach station is a former train station located in Monument Beach, Massachusetts.

== History ==
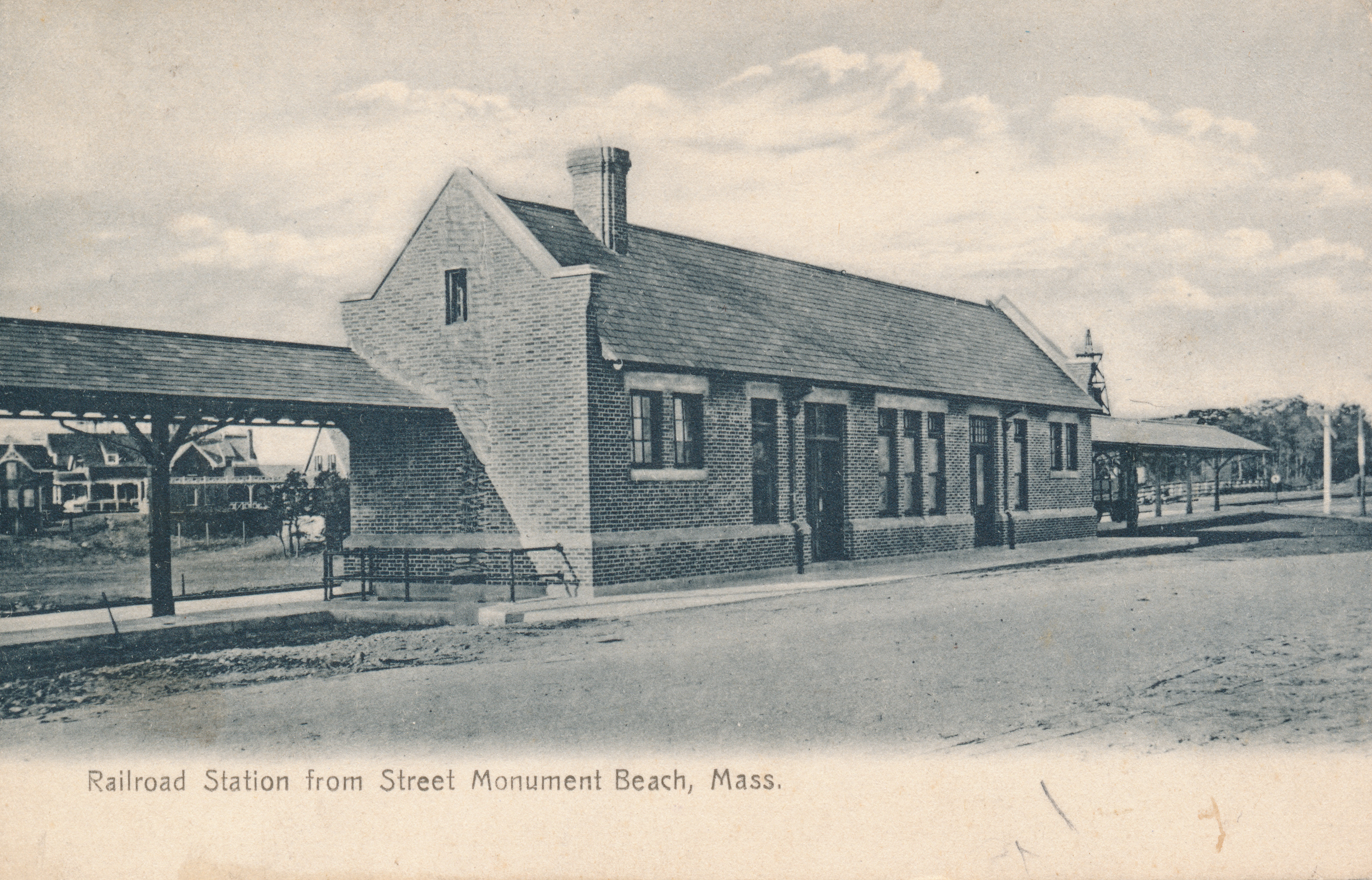
The third station at Monument Beach, c. 1910s

The station was originally built in 1875, three years after the Woods Hole branch of the Old Colony Railroad opened. The small depot was replaced by a larger structure in 1880. This building was destroyed in 1906, when the village burned down. It was then replaced by the current structure, a building which still has its protective overhangs over the platforms, despite the fact that it is now a private residence.
