= West Falmouth station =

Railroad station in USA

West Falmouth
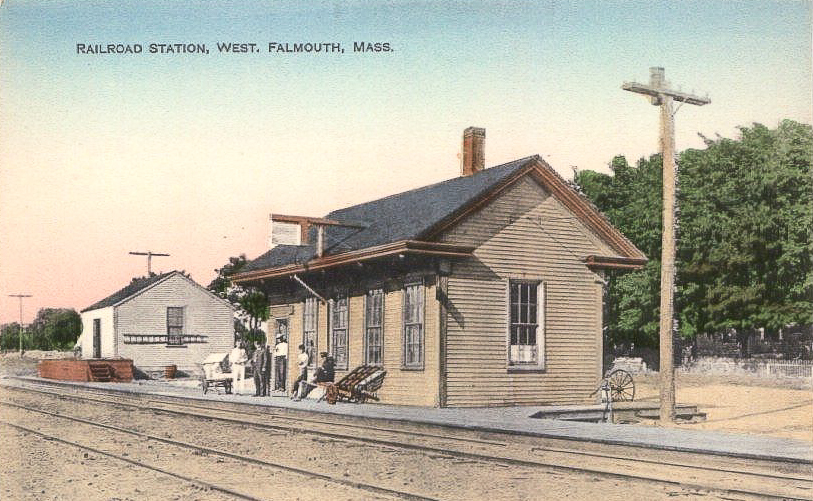
- Circa-1910 postcard of West Falmouth station

General information
- Location: Old Dock Road Road, West Falmouth, Massachusetts
- Coordinates: 41°36′14.29″N 70°38′12.31″W
- Line: Falmouth Branch

History
- Opened: 1872
- Closed: 1964

Former services
| Preceding station | New York, New Haven and Hartford Railroad | Following station |
|---|---|---|
| North Falmouth toward Boston | Boston–Woods Hole | Falmouth toward Woods Hole |
Location

West Falmouth station was a railroad station located on Old Dock Road in West Falmouth, Massachusetts.

The original station opened in 1872. It was torn down after rail service ended and the structure was removed prior to September, 1999. The tracks were raised and removed in 2008. In the following year, the Shining Sea Bikeway was completed in North Falmouth next to the rail line to Otis Air National Guard Base.
