= Cataumet station =

Former railroad station in Massachusetts, US

Cataumet
- The former Cataumet station in 2026

General information
- Location: Post Office Square; Cataumet, Massachusetts
- Coordinates: 41°39′59.60″N 70°36′47.46″W
- Owner: Privately owned
- Line: Falmouth Branch

History
- Opened: 1870s
- Rebuilt: 1883, 1925

Former services
Preceding station	Cape Cod and Hyannis Railroad	Following station
Buzzards Bay toward Braintree or Attleboro	Falmouth Branch Closed 1988	Falmouth Terminus
Preceding station	New York, New Haven and Hartford Railroad	Following station
Pocasset toward Boston	Boston–Woods Hole	North Falmouth toward Woods Hole
Pocasset toward New York	Cape Codder	North Falmouth toward Woods Hole
Location

Cataumet station is a former railroad station located on Post Office Square in Cataumet, Massachusetts.

== History ==
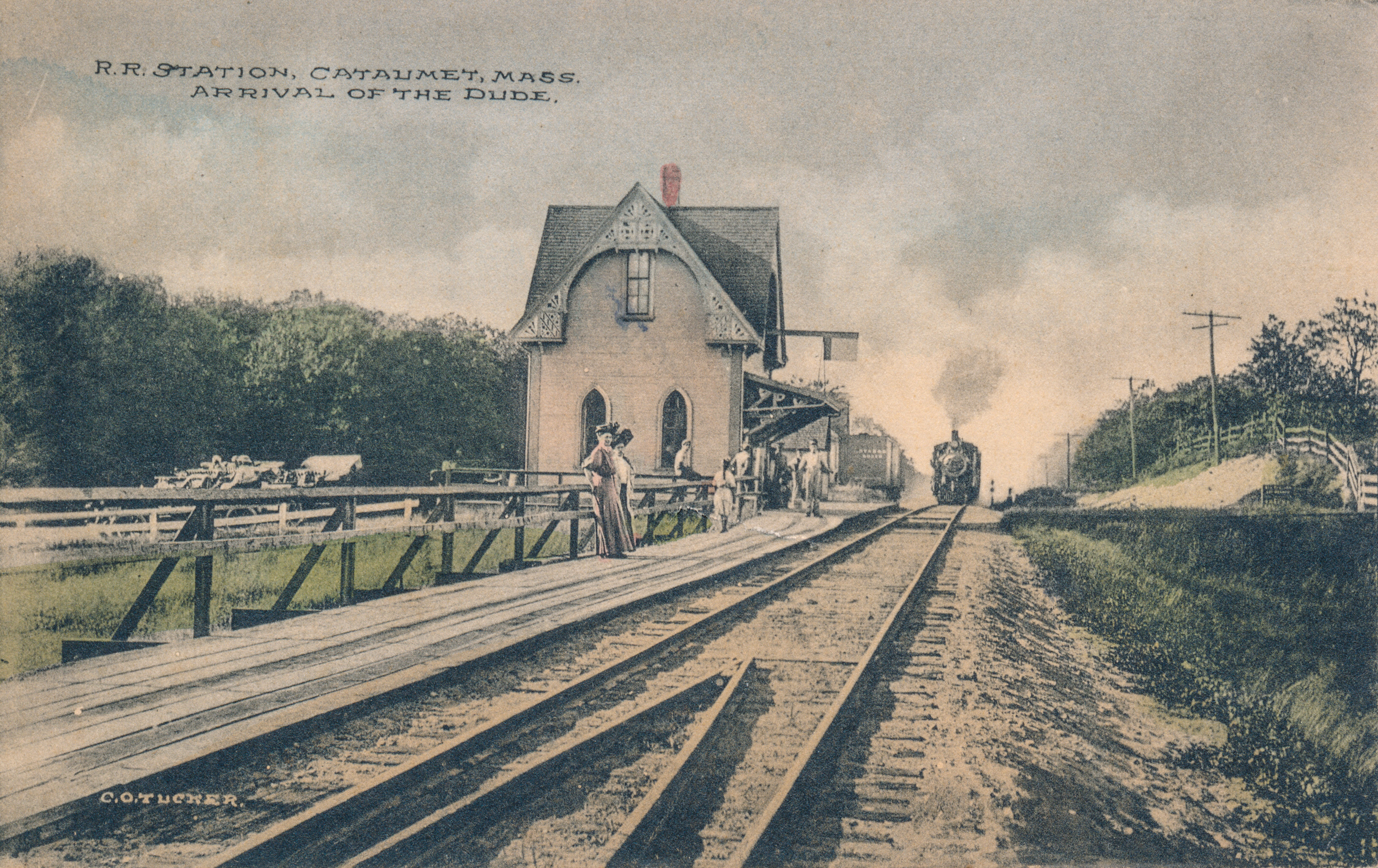
The original railroad around 1909

The Woods Hole Branch of the Old Colony Railroad opened in 1872. A station was open at Cataumet by 1879. A new station building was constructed in 1883. The gingerbread-style structure was destroyed by a fire in 1925 and subsequently replaced by a small brick structure which still stands today. It was last used as a railroad station in 1988 by the Cape Cod & Hyannis Railroad.
