= Ernest N. Boyden =

American architect (1852–1918)

- Born: March 23, 1852; Boston
- Died: July 10, 1918 (aged 66); Newtonville, Massachusetts
- Occupation: Architect

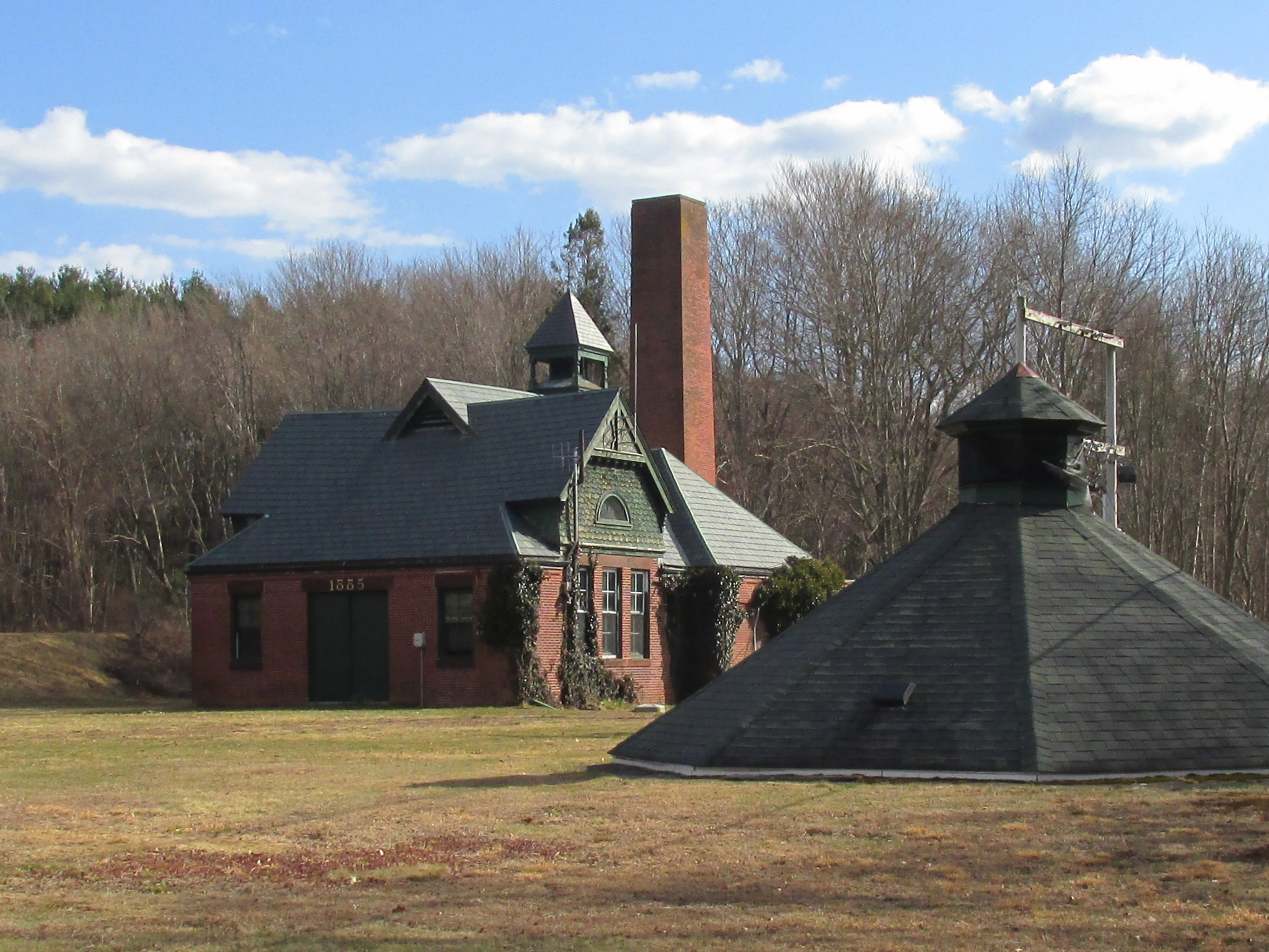
The Middleborough Waterworks, completed in 1885.

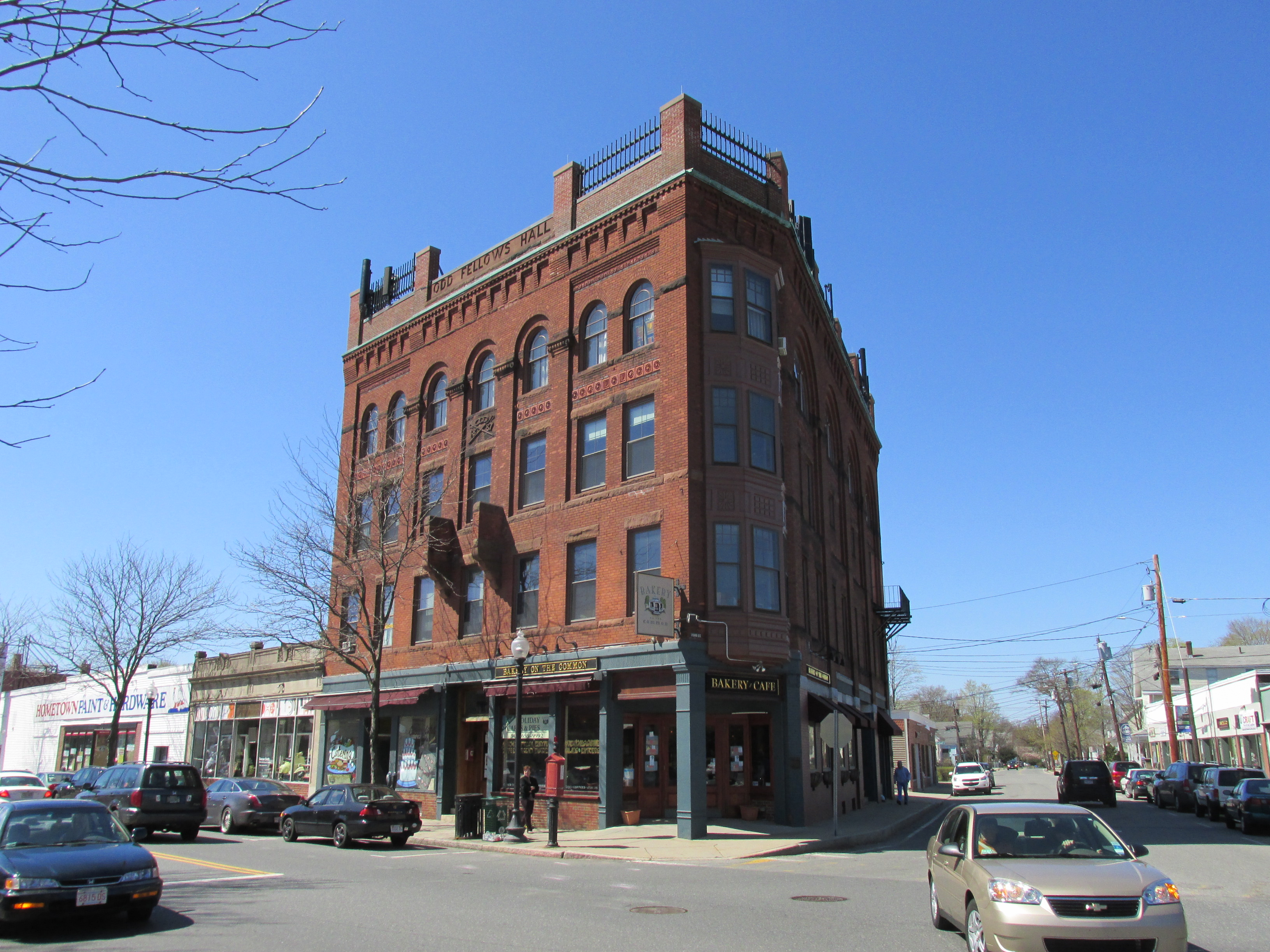
The former Odd Fellows Hall in Natick, completed in 1888.

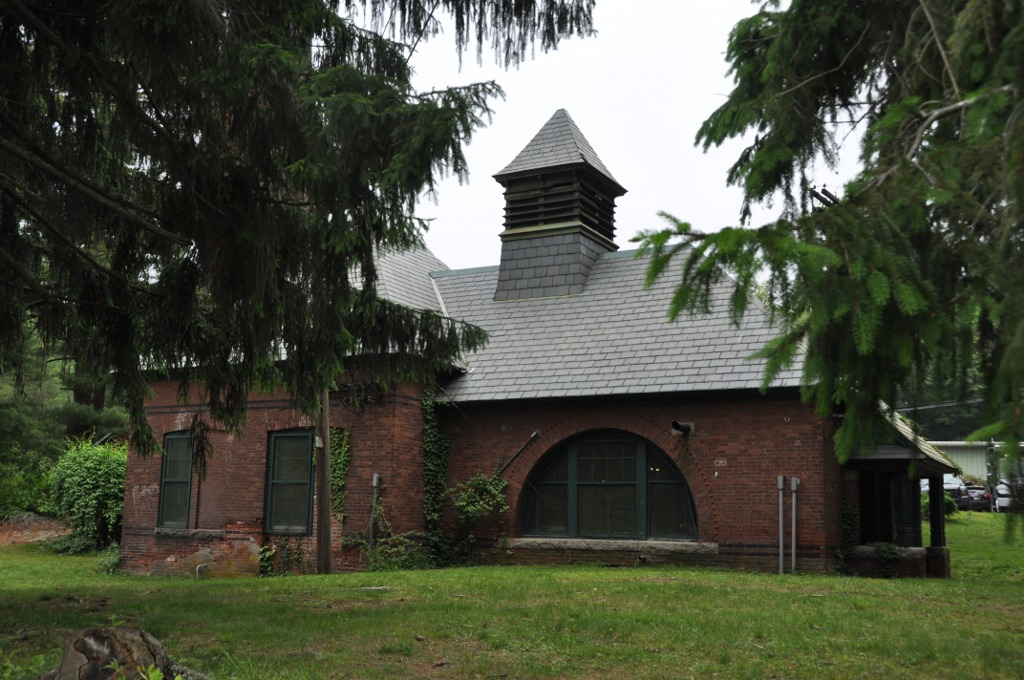
The Foxborough Pumping Station, completed in 1891.

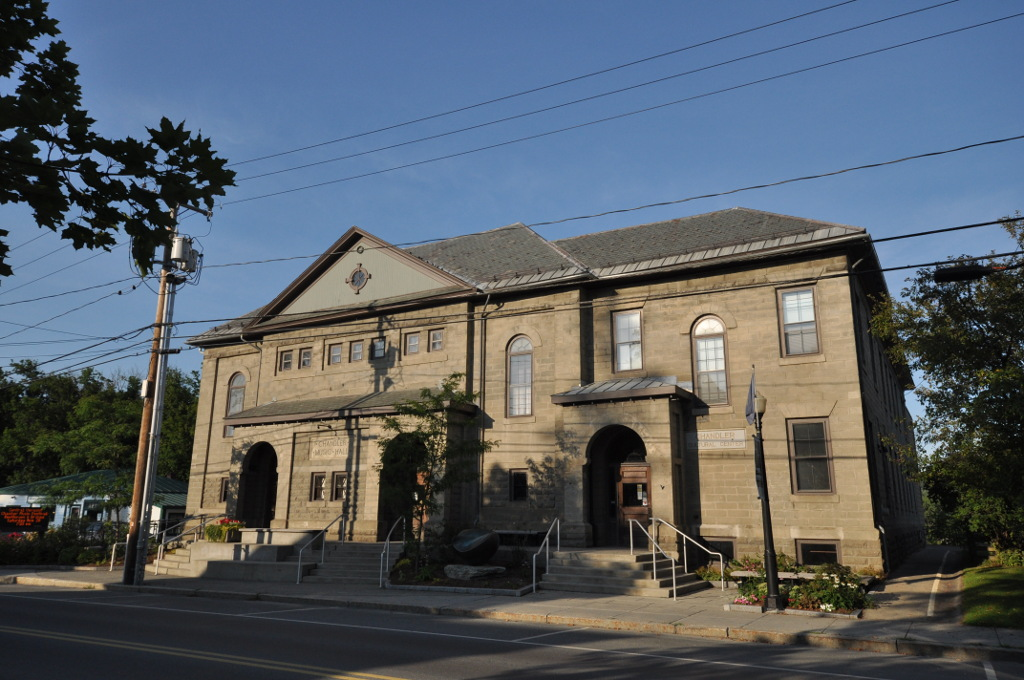
The Chandler Music Hall in Randolph, Vermont, completed in 1907.

Ernest N. Boyden (1852–1918) was an American architect in practice in Boston from 1875 until his death in 1918.

== Life and career ==
Ernest Niebuhr Boyden was born March 23, 1852, in Boston to Merrill N. Boyden, a bookkeeper, and Lucinda Ernestine (Niebuhr) Boyden, who died four days later. He was raised in the part of Needham that is now Wellesley, where he attended the public schools. He received his architectural training in the office of Boston architect Alexander Rice Esty, a noted designer of churches. He opened his own office in 1875 but remained part of a loose circle of architects associated with Esty until his death in 1881. Boyden built his practice chiefly around residential and church buildings, but is now best remembered for his series of water works facilities, several of which have been listed on the United States National Register of Historic Places. He remained in practice until his death.

== Personal life ==
Boyden was married in 1881 to Sarah Ella Smith in Randolph, Vermont. They had no children. Boyden died suddenly on July 10, 1918, at home in Newtonville at the age of 66.

Boyden was a distant cousin of Elbridge Boyden and Amos J. Boyden, notable architects from Worcester and Philadelphia, respectively.

== Architectural works ==
- Middleborough Waterworks, E Grove St, Middleborough, Massachusetts (1885, NRHP 1990)
- Ware Pumping Station, Barnes St, Ware, Massachusetts (1886)
- Janesville Pumping Station (former), 555 S River St, Janesville, Wisconsin (1887)
- Odd Fellows Hall, (Note: A contributing resource to the Natick Center Historic District, NRHP–listed in 1977.) 11 S Main St, Natick, Massachusetts (1888)
- James B. Case house, 89 Wellesley St, Weston, Massachusetts (1889)
- Seth R. Baker apartment building, (Note: A contributing resource to the Back Bay Historic District, NRHP–listed in 1973.) 199 Marlborough St, Boston (1890)
- Foxborough Pumping Station, 25 Pumping Station Rd, Foxborough, Massachusetts (1891, NRHP 1998)
- Olindus F. Kendall house, 1563 Massachusetts Ave, Cambridge, Massachusetts (1891, demolished 1968)
- Methuen Water Works, Cross St, Methuen, Massachusetts (1893, NRHP 1984)
- Roxbury Universalist Church, St Richard St, Roxbury, Boston (1895, demolished)
- Cambridge School for Girls (former), 34 Concord Ave, Cambridge, Massachusetts (1897)
- Music Hall Building, 1515 Hancock St, Quincy, Massachusetts (1897)
- Falmouth Pumping Station, Pumping Station Rd, Falmouth, Massachusetts (1898, NRHP 1998)
- Unity Church, 17 W Central St, Natick, Massachusetts (1903, burned 1967)
- Chandler Music Hall, 71 Main St, Randolph, Vermont (1907, NRHP 1973)
- Orrin E. Sands house, 2 Walnut Ave, Cambridge, Massachusetts (1911)
