= Chandler Music Hall =

- Chandler Music Hall and Bethany Parish House
- U.S. National Register of Historic Places
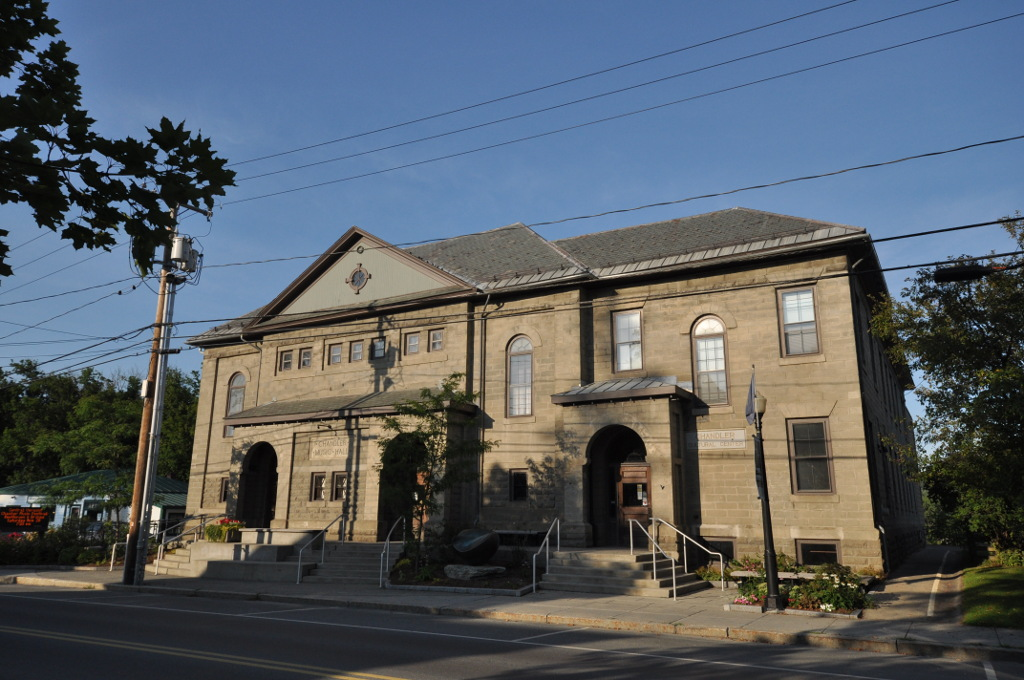

- Location within Vermont
- Location: 71 Main St., Randolph, Vermont
- Coordinates: 43°55′32″N 72°39′57″W
- Area: 1 acre (0.40 ha)
- Built: 1907
- Built by: Teachout, W. S.
- Architect: Ernest N. Boyden
- NRHP reference No.: 73000196
- Added to NRHP: July 16, 1973

Chandler Music Hall (AKA Chandler Center for the Arts) is a historic performance venue in Randolph, Vermont.

Built in 1907 as a combination music hall and parish house (the latter for the nearby Bethany Church), it has one of the best-preserved period theatrical interiors in northern New England. The building is owned by the town, and is used for entertainment events. The portion of the building that housed the parish house is now an art gallery. The building was listed on the National Register of Historic Places as Chandler Music Hall and Bethany Parish House in 1973.

== Description ==
The Chandler Music Hall is located in downtown Randolph, on the east side of Main Street just northeast of its junction with School Street. It is a large two-story masonry structure, built out of rusticated cast concrete blocks and covered by a truncated hip roof. Its styling is basically Romanesque, with arched entrances (two to the theater, one to the former parish house) and a combination of round-arch and rectangular windows. The theater entrances are set in a hip-roofed projecting that fronts a gable-roofed projection on the northern side of the main facade.

The theater interior has a vestibule with paneled ticket booth, and stairs on either side leading to the balcony. The auditorium has a wooden floor sloping down to the stage, and the balcony is supported by columns with Doric capitals, with theater boxes on either side near the stage. The stage area has a multicolored proscenium arch, and the space has a pressed metal ceiling.

== History ==
The impetus for construction of the music hall came from the merger of two churches in 1905. The Christian Church and Congregational Church stood across the street from one another, and shared a minister and similar theology. After they agreed to merge, Col. Albert B. Chandler offered to fund the construction of a music hall on the site of the Christian Church, with the combined church (now Bethany) funding the construction of the attached parish house. The music hall was a popular local event venue until the end of World War II, when it began a gradual decline. The theater was turned over to the town in 1947, which has continued to operate it since. In the 1970s, the parish and the town exchanged the parish house section for a house next to the church, which now serves as its parish house.
