= Methuen Water Works =

- U.S. National Register of Historic Places
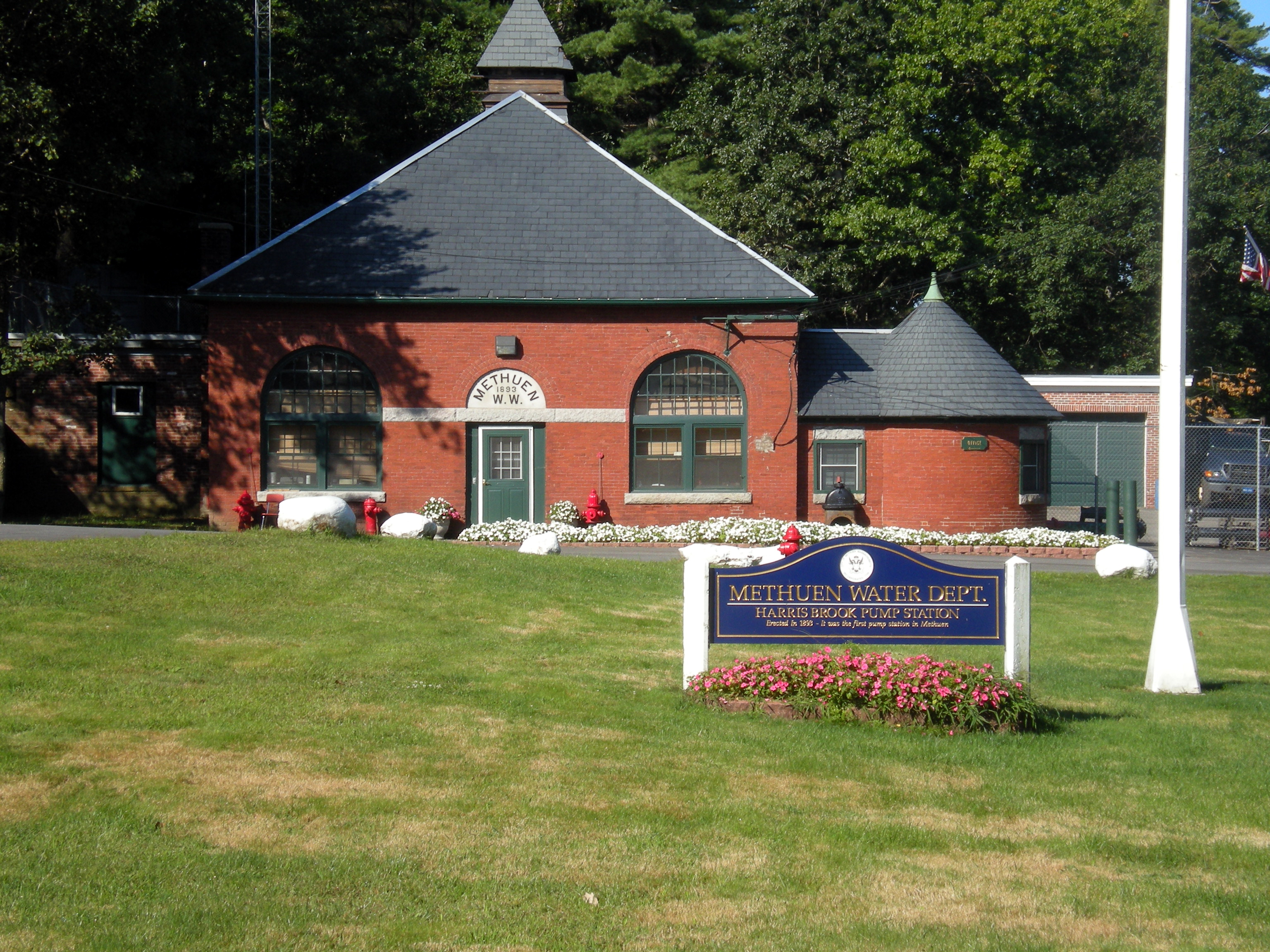

- Location within Massachusetts Location within the United States
- Location: Cross St., Methuen, Massachusetts
- Coordinates: 42°44′23″N 71°12′53″W
- Built: 1893
- Built by: Worthington, E., Jr., & Co.
- Architect: Ernest N. Boyden
- Architectural style: Romanesque
- MPS: Methuen MRA
- NRHP reference No.: 84002403
- Added to NRHP: January 20, 1984

The Methuen Water Works is a historic water works building on Cross Street in Methuen, Massachusetts. Built in 1893 or soon thereafter, it was one of the city's first major public works project. The surviving building, designed by Ernest N. Boyden, is a distinctive local example of Romanesque architecture. It was listed on the National Register of Historic Places in 1984. It now houses offices of the city's water department.

== Description and history ==
The former Methuen Water Works building is located in northwestern Methuen, on the west side of Cross Street near its crossing of Harris Brook. It is a single-story masonry structure, built out of red brick with a slate hip roof. At the center is a circular wooden cupola, which is clad in wooden shingles and topped by a conical roof. The main facade is three bays wide, with two large round-arch openings flanking the center entrance. A course of rusticated stone extends between the window bays and acts as a lintel for the entrance. To the right of the main block is a projecting hyphen that ends in a small circular brick structure, also capped by a conical roof. The interior originally housed a boiler in one chamber and steam-powered pump engine in another.

The town established a water board in 1893, which in September of that year approved construction of this building. It was designed by Ernest N. Boyden, whose credits include water works facilities in a number of other Massachusetts communities. It was largely complete later that year, built by Peabody and Pike of Lawrence. The pump in the facility was used to pump water from Harris Brook to a reservoir on Foster's Hill at 2,000 US gallons per minute (7,600 L/min). Construction of these facilities was funded in part by town taxes, and by gifts from local businessmen and philanthropists.

== See also ==
- National Register of Historic Places listings in Methuen, Massachusetts
- National Register of Historic Places listings in Essex County, Massachusetts
