= Foxborough Pumping Station =

- U.S. National Register of Historic Places
- U.S. Historic district
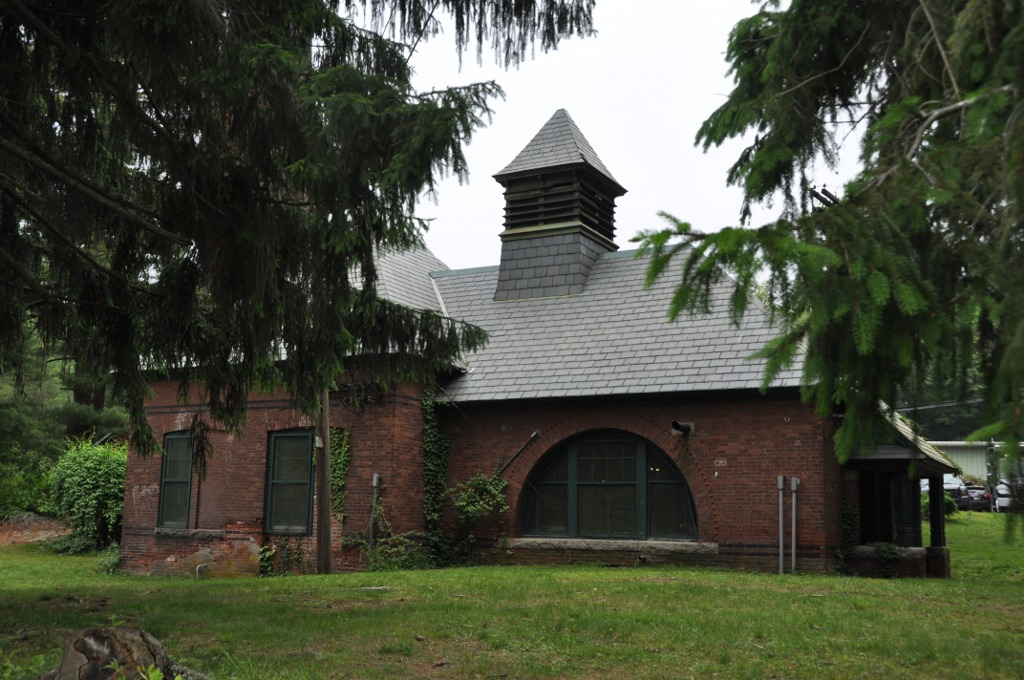

- Location within Massachusetts Location within the United States
- Location: Foxborough, Massachusetts
- Coordinates: 42°4′40″N 71°14′18″W
- Area: 26.6 acres (10.8 ha)
- Built: 1936
- Architect: Ernest N. Boyden; William O'Connell
- Architectural style: Queen Anne
- NRHP reference No.: 05001362
- Added to NRHP: December 6, 2005

The Foxborough Pumping Station is a historic water pumping station at 25 Pumping Station Road in Foxborough, Massachusetts. Its main pumphouse was designed by Ernest N. Boyden, a regionally known architect of water supply systems, and was built in 1891; it is a brick structure with Queen Anne styling. The station also includes several historic wells, a period garage, and the man-made Fales Pond, a once-dammed section of the Neponset Reservoir near the pumphouse. The station was listed on the National Register of Historic Places in 2005.

== Description and history ==
The Foxborough Pumping Station is located at the end of Pumping Station Road in northern Foxborough. It is located on 26.6 acres (10.8 ha), which include Fales Pond, now a section of the Neponset Reservoir, which impounds the headwaters of the Neponset River. The principal visible features of the station are its 1891 pumphouse, a Late Victorian brick building designed by Ernest N. Boyden, and a 1953 storage garage. Other features include several drilled wells dating to 1948, and a now-abandoned well field dating to the pumphouse's construction.

The town of Foxborough, initial an agricultural town, grew as an industrial center in the 19th century, specializing in the manufacture of straw hats. The town's industrial owners and the rise in population led to the need for a reliable public water supply for improved public health and the fire protection of important industrial assets. After a report on the matter was issued in 1879, it lay dormant until 1889, when proposals were made after the construction of the Foxborough State Hospital renewed calls for improved fire protection. A proposal for the present siting of the station was approved by the town in 1891. Ernest N. Boyden, then already known for his designs of other public water supply pumping stations, was retained to design the new facility. Twenty-four shallow wells were dug to draw groundwater, which the main pump then distributed. In 1948 these were replaced by three deep wells, which draw from the aquifer underlying the Neponset Reservoir. A fourth well was drilled in 1972, replacing the #2 well, whose casing had cracked.

== See also ==
- National Register of Historic Places listings in Norfolk County, Massachusetts
