= Falmouth station =

Bus station and former railroad station in Falmouth, Massachusetts

Falmouth
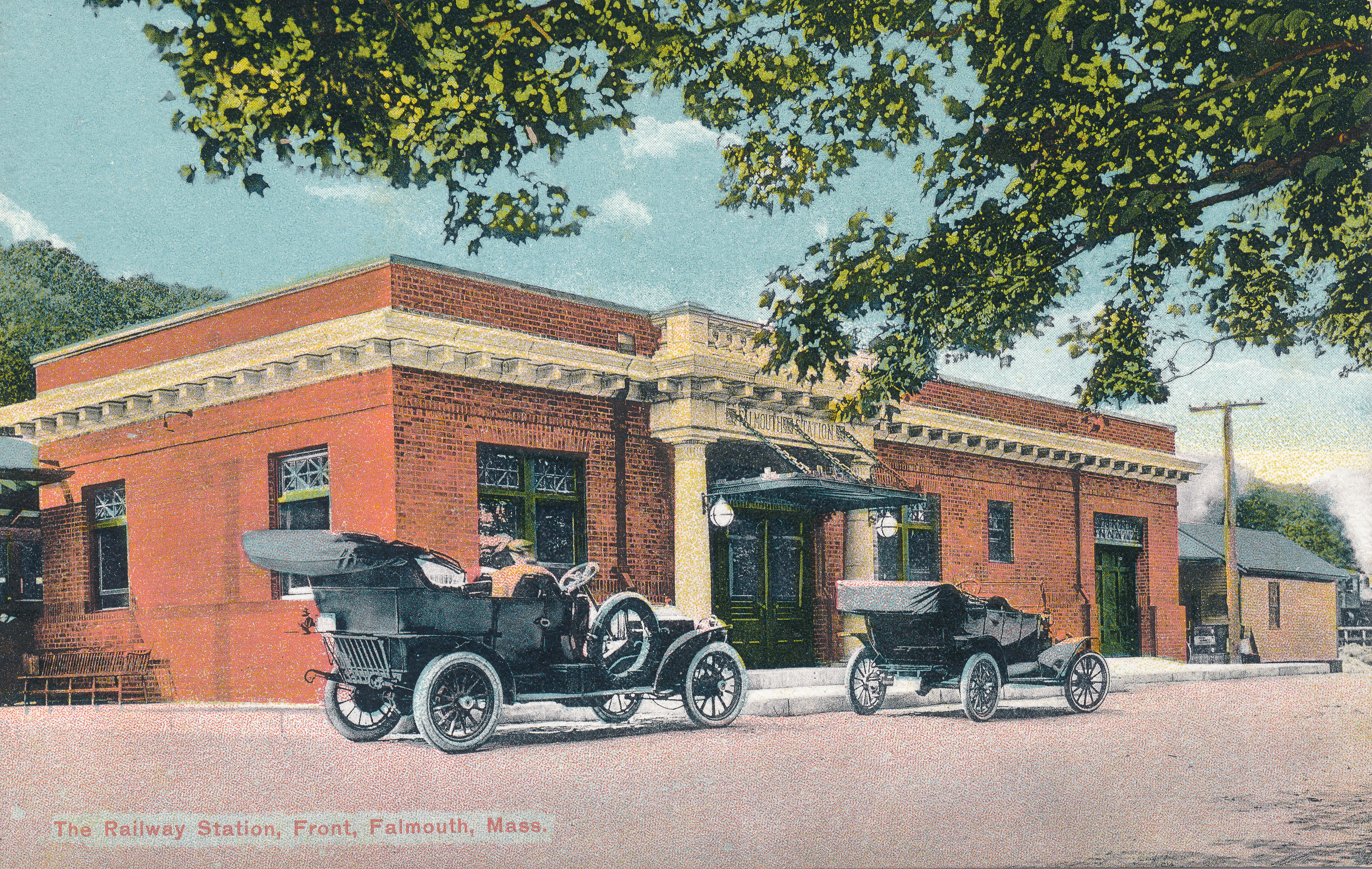
- Falmouth station ca. 1915

General information
- Location: Depot Avenue; Falmouth, Massachusetts
- Coordinates: 41°33′25″N 70°37′24″W
- Line: Falmouth Branch
- Platforms: 1 side platform

History
- Opened: 1872
- Closed: 1988 (in current use as a bus station)
- Rebuilt: 1912

Former services
Preceding station	Cape Cod and Hyannis Railroad	Following station
Cataumet toward Braintree or Attleboro	Falmouth Branch Closed 1988	Terminus
Preceding station	New York, New Haven and Hartford Railroad	Following station
West Falmouth toward Boston	Boston–Woods Hole	Woods Hole Terminus
North Falmouth toward New York	Cape Codder	Woods Hole Terminus
Location

Falmouth station is a bus station and former railroad station in Falmouth, Massachusetts. Built in 1912 to replace an older station, it was used for rail service until 1964, with brief revivals in 1984 and 1988.

== History ==
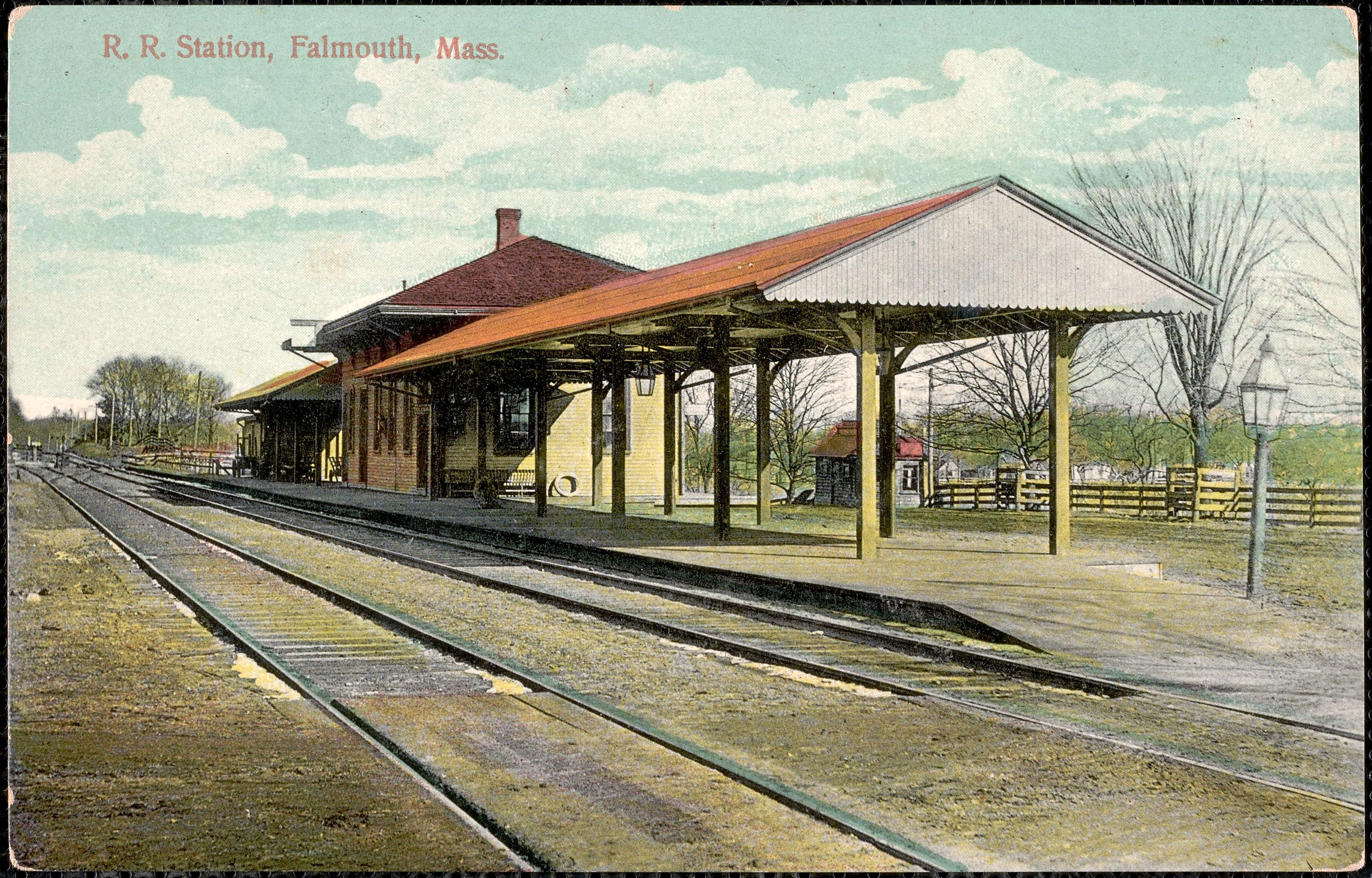
The original station around 1905

The original station in Falmouth was placed in service in 1872 when the Old Colony Railroad inaugurated service on the Woods Hole branch.

In 1912 the original station was sold to the Swift family who moved it across the tracks. In its place the New Haven Railroad built a replacement brick station, which stands to this day. It served daily year-round New Haven RR trains to Boston until 1959. Summertime service continued to 1964. The station was also a stop for day and nighttime versions of the NH's Cape Codder service to New York City; these trains were among the trains terminated in 1964.

=== Failed passenger service proposals ===
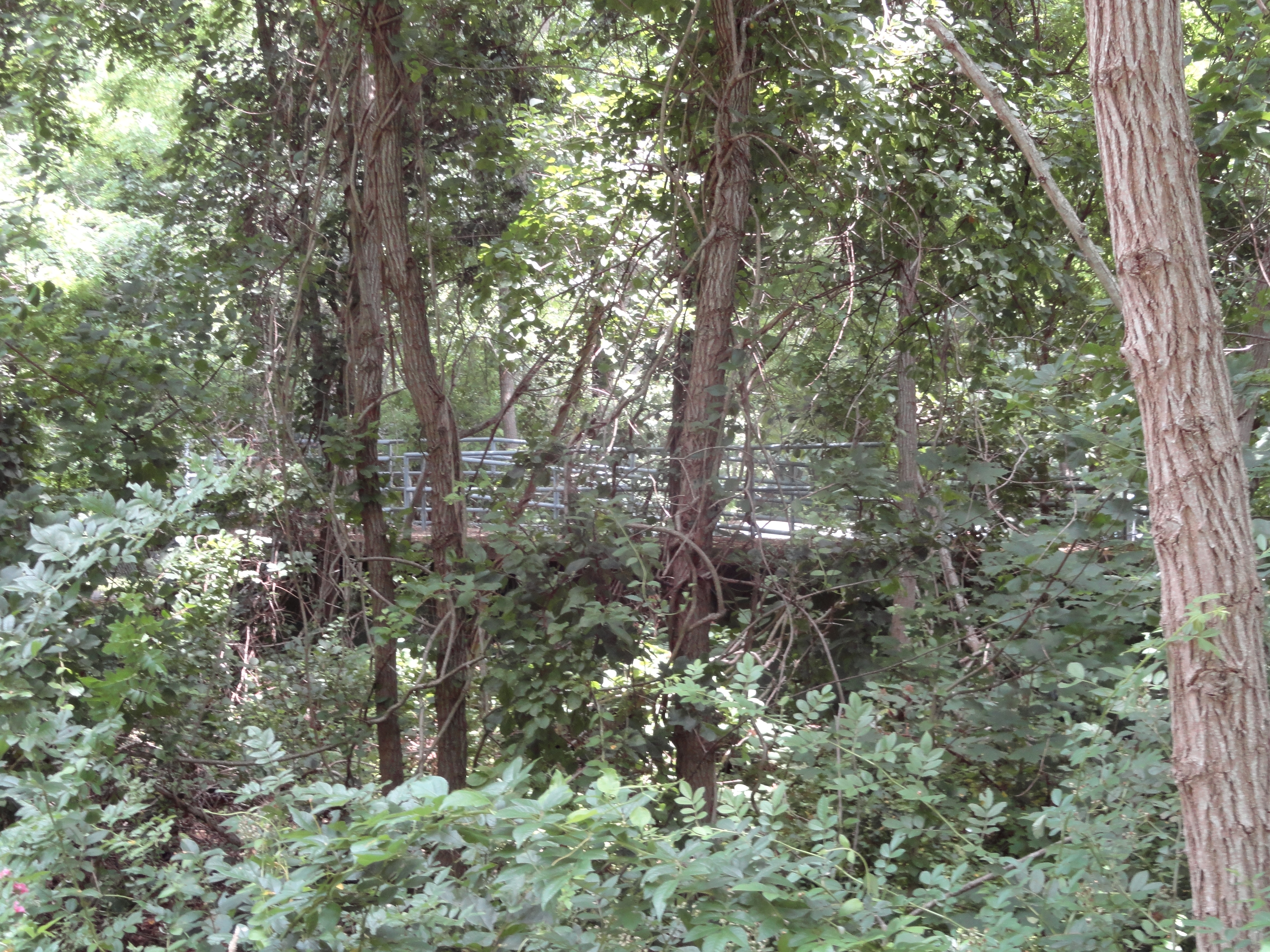
The unused platform in 2011

The Cape Cod and Hyannis Railroad served the station briefly in 1984, and again in 1988. In 1989, a mini-high level platform was built when commuter service was proposed by the Commonwealth of Massachusetts in order to ease traffic congestion in the seasonally popular town.

Falmouth rail service remained a hotly debated topic for nearly two decades, as the housing boom of the 1990s and 2000s took hold. With a new platform in Falmouth that never saw a passenger, resumption of passenger and freight service was promised by the commonwealth. However, pro-rail trail advocates wielded considerable political influence with State Representative Eric Turkington, who passed legislation before leaving office in 2008 that provided funding for the extension of the rail trail to North Falmouth. In June 2008, the line was cut back to North Falmouth and replaced with an extension of the existing bike path. Additionally, this cut off any possibility of restoration of service to Woods Hole Railroad Station, the traditional final station of the north-south branch from Bourne on the west side of the Cape.

=== Bus depot and cafe ===
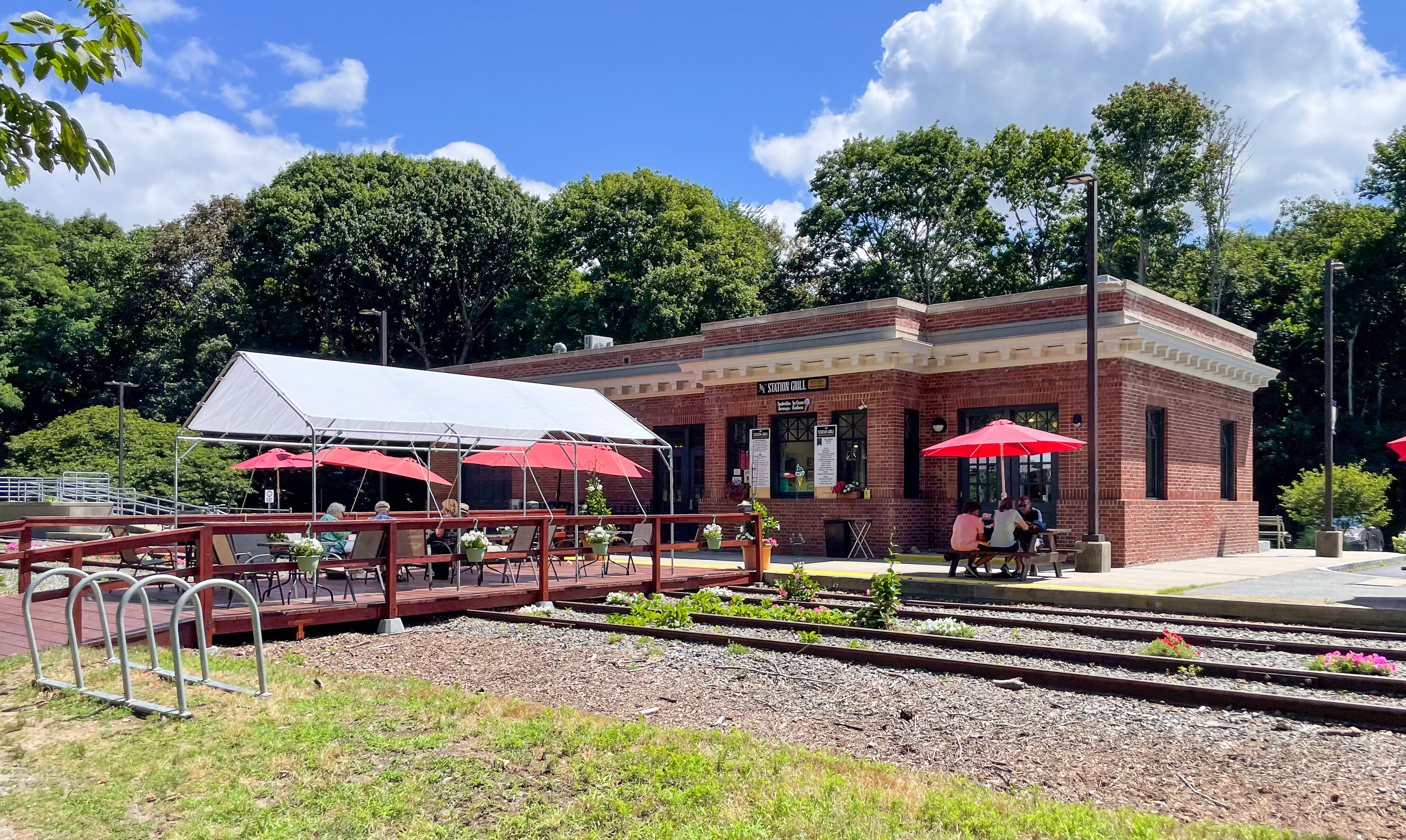
The Station Grill

The station was converted in 1989 for use as a bus depot. In 2015 the station was leased by Massachusetts DOT to the Falmouth Economic Development and Industrial Corporation (EDIC). The Falmouth EDIC renovated the station, retaining much of the historic design and details. The station opened in Spring 2017 as a transportation center, café and event venue. The station is served by the Peter Pan Bus Lines, Plymouth & Brockton Bus Company, and Cape Cod Regional Transit Authority. The station is home to The Station Grill cafe, which serves meals and snacks to travelers and bicyclists.

=== Shining Sea Bikeway ===
The rail line that once carried trains to the station was converted into the Shining Sea Bikeway in 1975.
