= Southeastern Massachusetts Resource Recovery Facility =

- Country: United States
- Location: Rochester, Massachusetts
- Coordinates: 41°48′11.38″N 70°47′21.27″W
- Status: Operational
- Commission date: 1988
- Owner: Reworld

Thermal power station
- Primary fuel: Organic waste

Power generation
- Nameplate capacity: 84 MW

The Southeastern Massachusetts Resource Recovery Facility (commonly known as SEMASS) is a waste-to-energy and recycling facility located in Rochester, Massachusetts. It is currently owned by Reworld.

The United States Environmental Protection Agency mandated closure of unlined landfills in the early 1980s, after which many Cape Cod communities signed agreements to send their municipal waste to SEMASS. Two facilities to transfer trash from trucks to railroad hopper cars, the Upper Cape Regional Transfer Station and the Yarmouth-Barnstable Regional Transfer Station were constructed to consolidate trash receipts and minimize the number of garbage trucks making round trips between their respective towns and SEMASS. The goal was to conserve fuel, lower transportation costs, reduce vehicle exhaust pollution, and mitigate traffic congestion on and near the two bridges spanning the Cape Cod Canal. Massachusetts Coastal Railroad, is the rail service provider for the facility.

The towns served by the station had 30-year disposal contracts with SEMASS that expired between 2015 and 2016. By 2013 the per-ton rates paid by the towns were all well below market rates.

Six towns, Brewster, Chatham, Eastham, Sandwich, Truro, and Yarmouth, renewed with SEMASS, but a competitor, ABC Disposal Service of New Bedford, signed up seven other towns, Barnstable, Dennis, Harwich, Mashpee, Orleans, Provincetown, and Wellfleet, with a promise to build a new recycling and disposal plant. As of 2016 the plant has not been built, the waste is being sent to landfills and ABC has filed for bankruptcy. As of November 2019 ABC has approached Mashpee looking for a substantial increase in their tipping fees claiming the failure to reach an agreement may force the company out of business. ABC has still not completed the promised waste to brickette facility that they sold many towns on.
