= Middleborough Waterworks =

- U.S. National Register of Historic Places
- U.S. Historic district
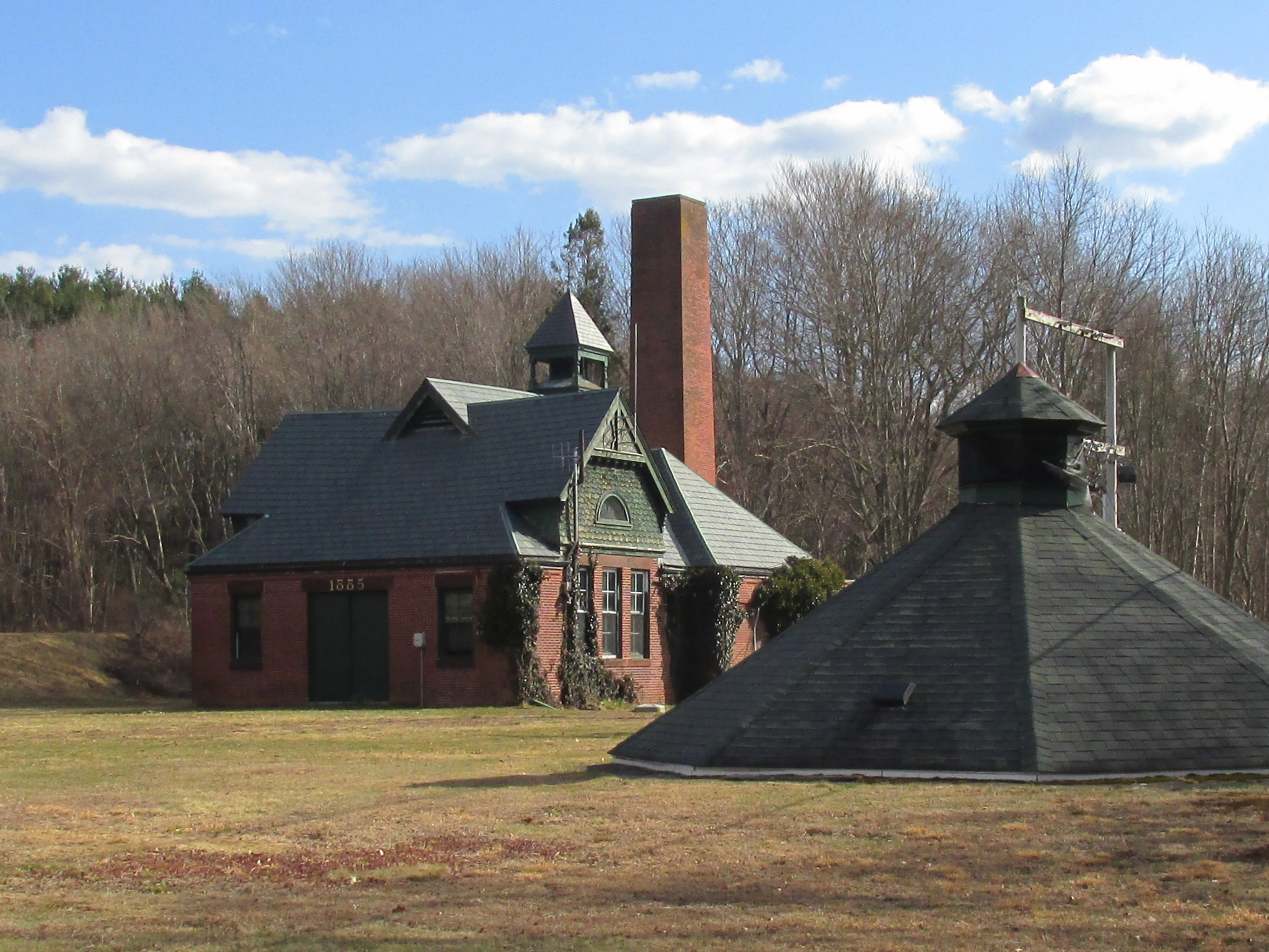
- Middleborough Waterworks Pumping Station

- Location within Massachusetts Location within the United States
- Location: Middleborough, Massachusetts
- Coordinates: 41°53′11″N 70°53′46″W
- Architect: Multiple
- Architectural style: Queen Anne
- NRHP reference No.: 90000129
- Added to NRHP: March 2, 1990

The Middleborough Waterworks are historic waterworks on E. Grove St. at Nesmasket River and Wareham St. at Barden Hill Road in Middleborough, Massachusetts. The 1885 masonry pumphouse is one of the earliest public water works buildings in southeastern Massachusetts. It, and the well from which it pumps water, were built by the local fire district. The building has Queen Anne styling; the well itself is covered by an octagonal roof with cupola.

The waterworks were added to the National Register of Historic Places in 1990.

== See also ==
- National Register of Historic Places listings in Plymouth County, Massachusetts
