= Upper Cape Regional Transfer Station =

Waste facility in Massachusetts, US

Coordinates: 41°38′41.81″N 70°33′17.37″W

The Upper Cape Regional Transfer Station (UCRTS) is a municipal waste transfer facility located within Joint Base Cape Cod. The facility is within the town limits of Falmouth, but on state-owned land at the southern end of the military base, and is about a mile west of the Falmouth entrance gate. It is one of two truck-to-rail trash transfer facilities on Cape Cod, with the other being the Yarmouth-Barnstable Regional Transfer Station.

== Overview ==
The facility takes in trash truck deliveries from the towns of Falmouth, Mashpee, and Sandwich, as well as the military reservation's tenants. Independent commercial haulers also deliver solid waste to the facility and are billed by the UCRTS on a tonnage basis. Trash is transferred to railroad hopper cars and transported to the SEMASS waste-to-energy plant in Rochester, Massachusetts.

The facility is jointly operated by three Upper Cape Cod towns – Falmouth, Mashpee and Sandwich. The Town of Bourne was an original member but voted to end its membership in 2022. The facility is managed by a three person board of managers through an intermunicipal agreements among the three member towns.

It is managed under the oversight of the Cape Cod Commission, the state's regional planning, regulatory and permitting agency for the Cape Cod district. A four-person board of managers—one from each of the four Upper Cape towns—administers the transfer facility's operation and finances. Bourne has its own municipal landfill and does not bring any waste to the station, but maintains its seat on the board of managers and contributes to the costs of running the facility in order to preserve its future participation options.

The transfer station was built and opened in 1989 following the EPA's mandated closure of unlined landfills in the early 1980s, after which many Cape Cod communities signed agreements to send their municipal waste to SEMASS. The UCRTS, through consolidation of trash receipts, was intended to minimize the number of garbage trucks making round trips between their respective towns and SEMASS to conserve fuel, lower transportation costs, reduce vehicle exhaust pollution, and mitigate traffic congestion on and near the two bridges spanning the Cape Cod Canal. Massachusetts Coastal Railroad, a subsidiary of Iowa Pacific Holdings, is the rail service provider for the UCRTS and is contracted by the four towns to transport a minimum of 40,000 combined tons of waste annually.

As of June 2010 the station is operated by two Falmouth Department of Public Works employees. According to an April 2010 commission report, the UCRTS takes in 36,519 tons of municipal waste annually. The total cost to operate the station is about $300,000 annually.

The towns served by the UCRTS have 30-year disposal contracts with SEMASS that are set to expire between 2015 and 2016. As of 2010 the present-day per-ton rates paid by the towns are all well below market rates, and new agreements will be far more expensive. The Cape Cod Commission is exploring future means of trash disposal for all 15 towns within the district, including transport to out-of-state facilities, but most of the options under consideration would retain and perhaps expand use of the UCRTS.

It was announced on 5 December 2014 that the station would close at the end of the month due to changes in contracts with SEMASS by towns in the immediate region. The station reopened in 2017 under a new contact.

== See also ==
- Environment of the United States
