= Falmouth Pumping Station =

- U.S. National Register of Historic Places
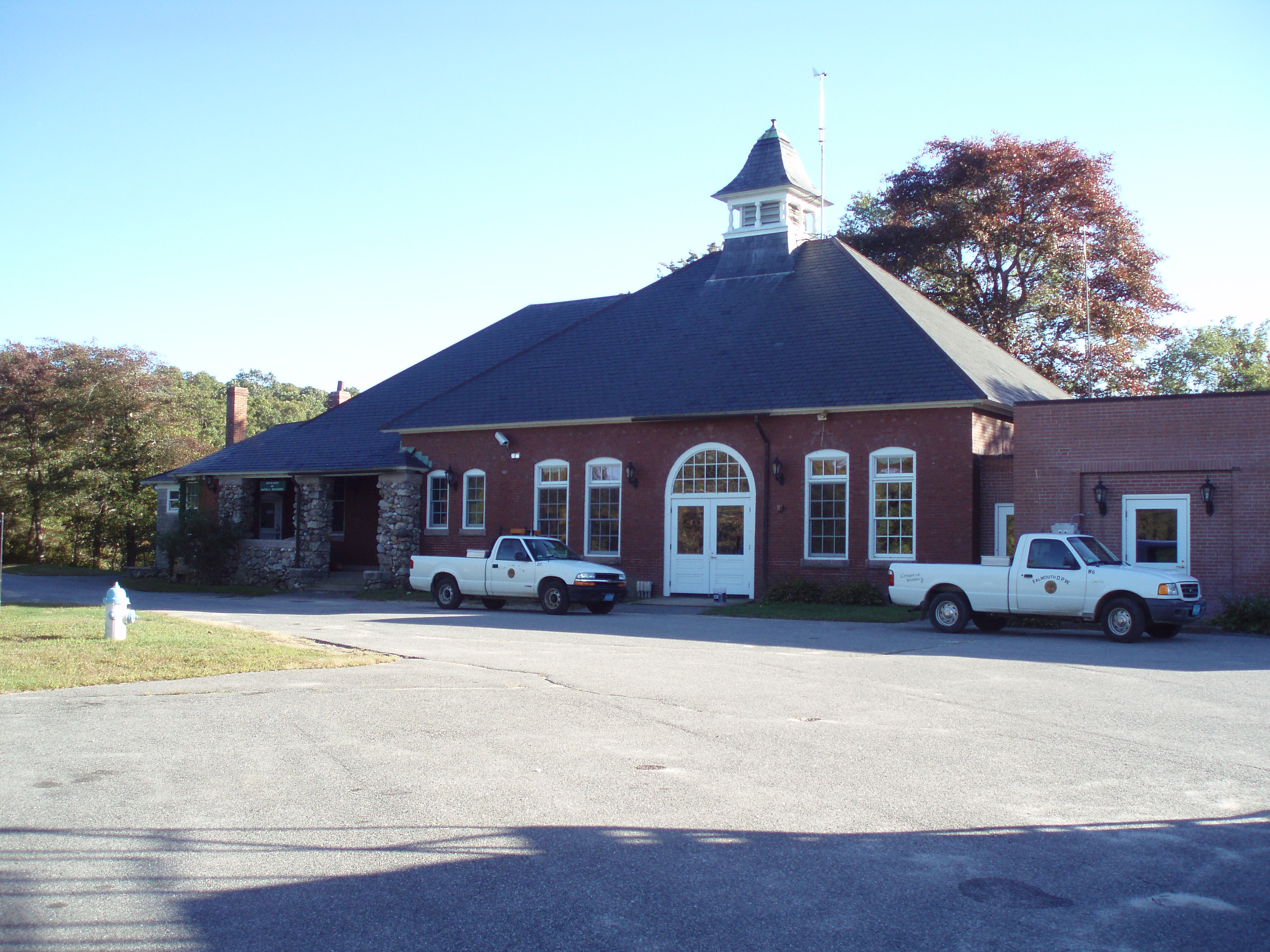
- Falmouth Pumping Station

- Location within Cape Cod Location within Massachusetts Location within the United States
- Location: Falmouth, Massachusetts
- Coordinates: 41°34′15″N 70°36′57″W
- Area: 8.4 acres (3.4 ha)
- Built: 1898
- Architect: Ernest N. Boyden
- Architectural style: Queen Anne
- NRHP reference No.: 98000148
- Added to NRHP: February 26, 1998

The Falmouth Pumping Station is a historic water pumping station on Pumping Station Road in Falmouth, Massachusetts. The complex consists of an 1898 Queen Anne pumping station designed by Ernest N. Boyden, a low-lift pump and water treatment building built in 1993, a chlorination tank also built in 1993, and a house and garage added in 1932. The plant was built in response to rising demand for vacation properties and fire suppression, and continues to fulfill those functions today. The complex was listed on the National Register of Historic Places in 1998.

== Description and history ==
The Falmouth Pumping Station is set on and adjacent to a narrow isthmus of land which separates Grews Pond from Long Pond in central-western Falmouth. Its 8.4-acre (3.4 ha) parcel lies within Good Will Park, most of which lies to its south, and is otherwise surrounded by town-owned land. Vehicular access is via Pumping Station Road, which is normally limited to town personnel. A walking trail around Long Pond passes next to the pumping station (at the location labeled "Water Dept" on the linked map).

The pumphouse is a three-section masonry structure measuring about 150 by 60 feet (46 m × 18 m). Its central portion, originally housing a steam engine, boiler room, and pump, was designed by Ernest N. Boyden, a Massachusetts architect noted for his waterworks designs, and dates to 1898. The eastern section is an engineer's dwelling that was added in 1903 (also to Boyden's specifications), and the western section is a newer pump building added in 1953. Boyden's section is the most architecturally elaborate, with a hip roof topped by a bellcast cupola, windows set in segmented-arch openings, and a larger round-arched main entrance with double doors. The engineer's dwelling is characterized by a porch with large fieldstone piers.

The low-lift pumping and water treatment building, and the chlorination tank are both set across the road from the pumphouse. The former is a simple brick building with a shallow-pitch gable roof. The tank, which has a capacity of 1,000,000 US gallons (3,800,000 L; 830,000 imp gal), is built out of reinforced concrete and has shallow domed top. The house and garage are located down the road to the west of these structures. The house is a 1 1/2-story structure built out of rusticated concrete blocks, with a side-gable roof that has three gabled dormers. Directly adjoining is a five-bay wood-frame garage, also with a side-gable roof.

Prior to the construction of this complex, Falmouth residents took their water from either open water sources or hand-pumped wells. The town by 1896 provided seven hand-pumped wells for this purpose. Although the community at first resisted establishing a municipal water supply, growing demand from vacationers who owned property in the town, combined with increasing fire insurance rates for areas not covered by a municipal water system, prompted its construction. The Falmouth Water Supply Company, a private venture controlled by summer residents, was established in 1898. The complex was built on land owned by one of the proprietors, Joseph Story Fay, who had also given Good Will Park to the town. The town in 1900 voted to exercise an option to purchase the company from its owners, a process completed two years later. The town eventually also purchased a number of other private water providers.

== See also ==
- National Register of Historic Places listings in Barnstable County, Massachusetts
