= Woods Hole station =

Railway station in Massachusetts, United States

Woods Hole
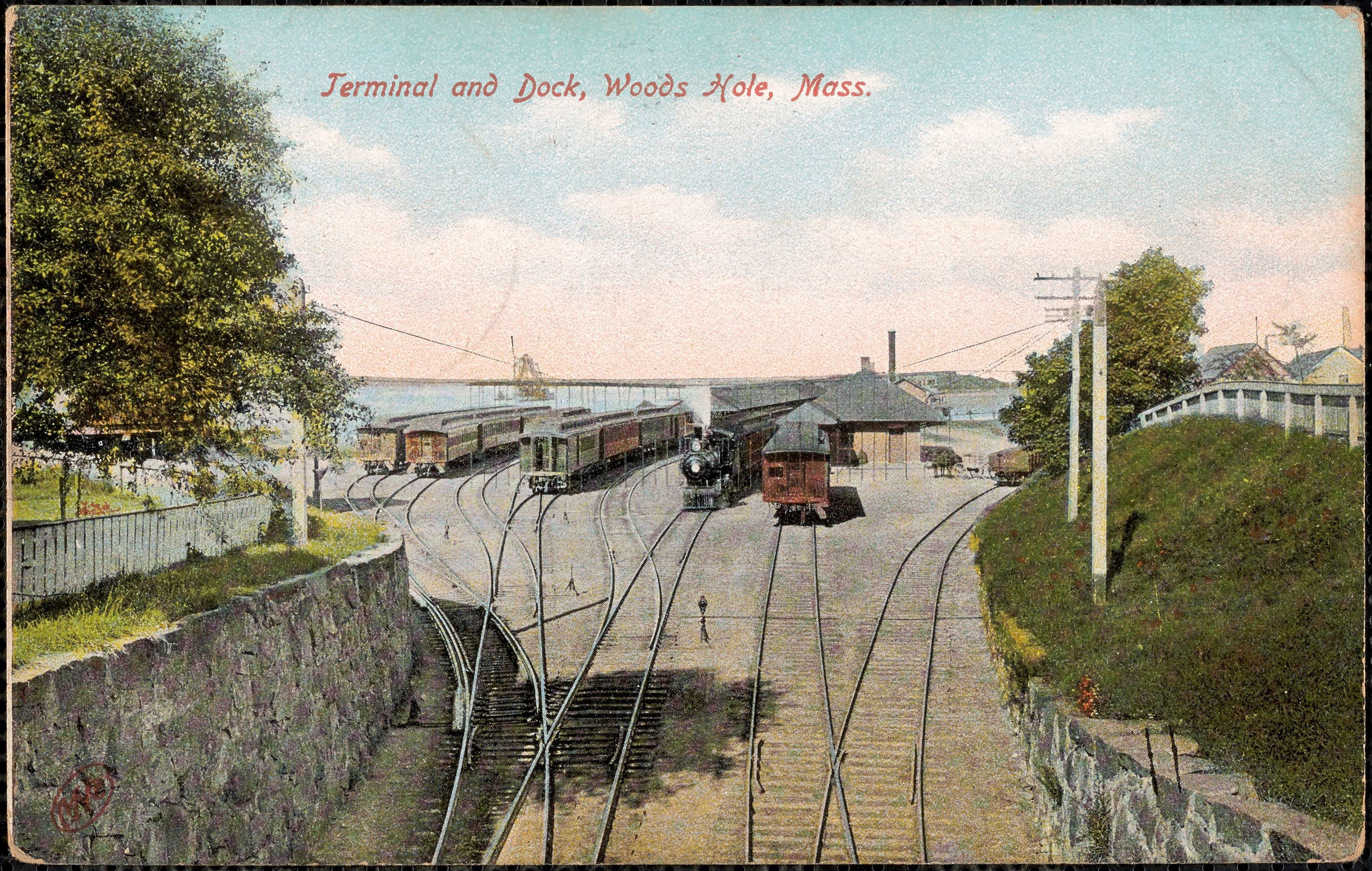
- Early-20th-century postcard of Woods Hole station

General information
- Location: Railroad Avenue; Woods Hole, Massachusetts
- Coordinates: 41°31′22.42″N 70°40′08.99″W
- Line: Falmouth Branch
- Connections: Ferry service to Martha's Vineyard and Nantucket

History
- Opened: 1872
- Closed: 1964
- Rebuilt: 1899

Former services
| Preceding station | New York, New Haven and Hartford Railroad | Following station |
|---|---|---|
| Falmouth toward Boston | Boston–Woods Hole | Terminus |
| Falmouth toward New York | Cape Codder | Terminus |
Location

Woods Hole station was a station on the Old Colony Railroad located in the village of Woods Hole in the town of Falmouth, Massachusetts. It served as the terminus for the railroad's branch line to Woods Hole and offered ferry connections to Martha's Vineyard and Nantucket.

== History ==
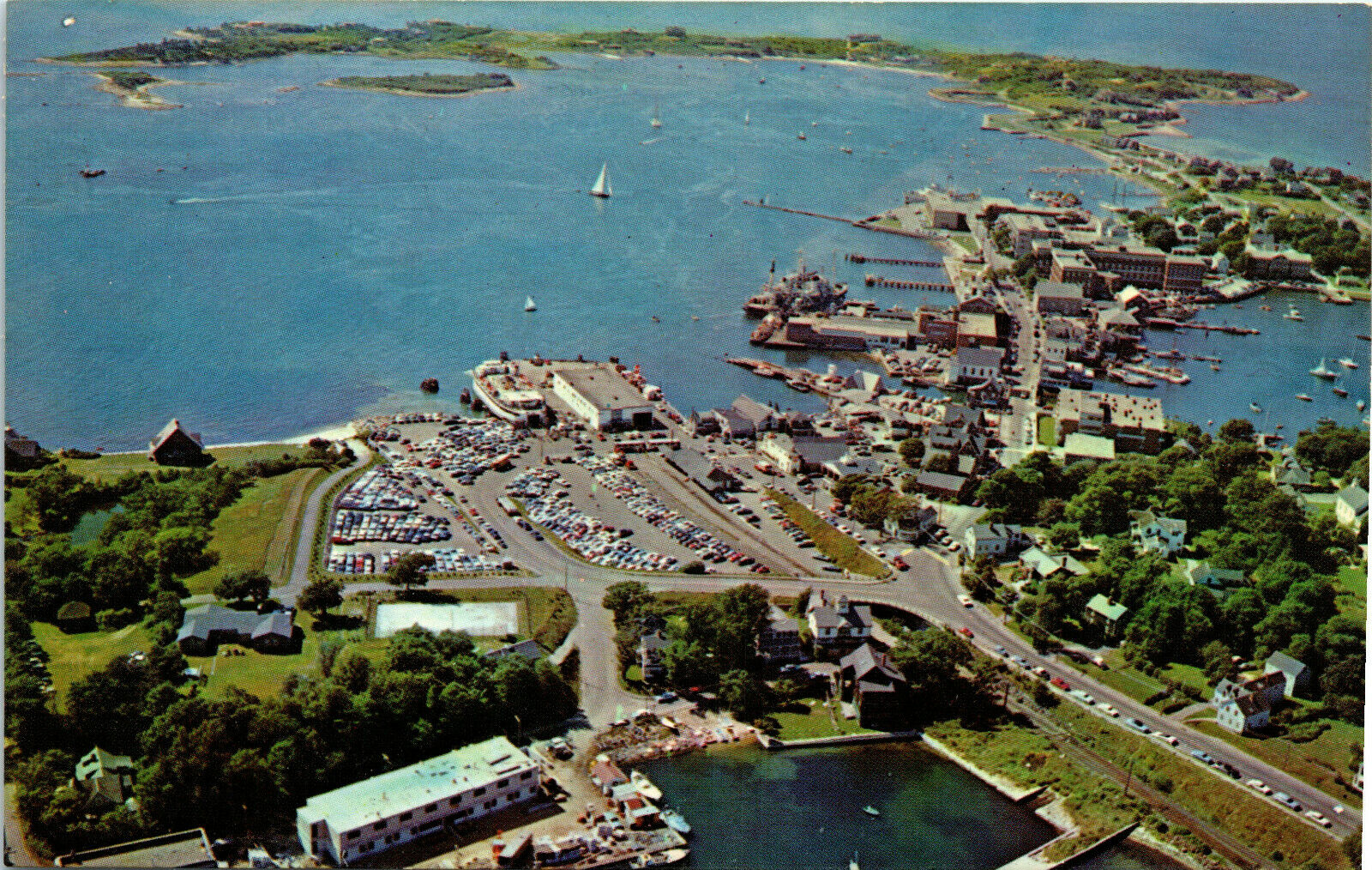
Detail from a 1950s postcard showing the station and ferry landing

The original wooden station was built at the end of the Woods Hole Branch of the Old Colony Railroad in 1872. The Woods Hole Branch opened on July 17, 1872. The station was located close to docks where passengers could board ferries to Martha's Vineyard and Nantucket, so it served as a transfer station for vacationers traveling to the islands. In 1893, the New York, New Haven and Hartford Railroad leased the Old Colony Railroad and took over operations on the line. In 1899, the station building was replaced by a brick structure. Into the early 1960s the New Haven operated daily trains to Boston and seasonal trains such as the day and night versions of the Cape Codder to New York City.

In 1964, passenger rail service to Woods Hole ceased, and the station closed. The tracks were torn up in 1969, and the station building was demolished in 1970. In 1977, work began on the Shining Sea Bikeway, a rail trail on the Woods Hole branch line's right-of-way, and its southern trailhead is located on the site of the former Woods Hole station. Ferries continue to service the nearby docks, and the Steamship Authority uses the former rail yard as a parking lot.
